= Dissidents in the 1989 Tiananmen Square protests and massacre =

The 1989 Tiananmen Square protests and massacre, commonly known in mainland China as the June Fourth Incident, were student-led demonstrations in Beijing (the capital of the People's Republic of China) in 1989. More broadly, it refers to the popular national movement inspired by the Beijing protests during that period, sometimes called the '89 Democracy Movement. The protests were forcibly suppressed after Chinese Premier Li Peng declared martial law. In what became known in the West as the Tiananmen Square Massacre, troops with assault rifles and tanks fired at the demonstrators trying to block the military's advance towards Tiananmen Square.

Dissidents included student leaders, intellectuals and other citizens.

== Student leaders ==
On 13 June 1989, the Beijing Public Security Bureau released an order for the arrest of 21 students who they identified as leaders of the protest. These student leaders were part of the Beijing Students Autonomous Federation which had been an instrumental student organization in the Tiananmen Square protests. Prominent leaders such as Wang Dan, Wu'er Kaixi and Chai Ling topped the list. Immediately after the release of the list, only 7 out of the 21 Most Wanted student leaders could manage to escape China, with assistance from the Hong-Kong based organization Operation Yellowbird. Though decades have passed, the Most Wanted list has never been retracted by the Chinese government.

=== Official release ===
The Beijing Public Security Bureau issued the 21 Most Wanted list with the following description:

The illegal organization "Beijing Students Autonomous Federation" instigated and organized the counter-revolutionary rebellion in Beijing. It is now decided to pursue 21 of its head and key members, including Wang Dan. After receiving this order, please immediately arrange investigation work. If found, immediate arrest the targets and inform the Beijing Public Security Bureau.

Photographs with biographical descriptions of the 21 Most Wanted followed in this order on the poster:

Name		Age or date of birth	Origin	Other remarks or characteristics
Wang Dan	Male	26 February 1969	Jilin	Student of the Department of History at Peking University, 173 cm tall, thin hair, slim build, wears glasses, Beijing accent
Wu'er Kaixi	Male	17 February 1968	Xinjiang	Student of the Department of Education at Beijing Normal University, 174 cm tall, long face, big eyes, thick lips, often wears green army pants
Liu Gang	Male	28	Liaoyuan City, Jilin Province	Former graduate student of Department of Physics at Peking University, now unemployed, 165 cm tall, square face, northeastern accent
Chai Ling	Female	15 April 1966	Rizhao City, Shandong Province	Han nationality, graduate student of Department of Psychology at Beijing Normal University, 156 cm tall, round face, high cheekbones, short hair, white skin
Zhou Fengsuo	Male	5 October 1967	Chang'an County, Shaanxi Province	Han nationality, student of Department of Physics, Tsinghua University, 176 cm tall, square face, pointed chin, heavy eyebrows
Zhai Weimin	Male	21	Xin'an County, Henan Province	Student of Beijing Institute of Economics, 168 cm tall, thin build, long-face, dark complexion, heavy Henan accent
Liang Qingdun	Male	11 May 1969	Pengxi, Sichuan Province	Student of Department of Psychology at Beijing Normal University, 171 cm tall, lean, darker complexion, rectangular face, small eyes, high nose, thick lips, speaks Mandarin
Wang Zhengyun	Male	October 1968	Lives in Nanke District, Jinping County, Honghe Prefecture, Yunnan Province	Student of Central Institute of Nationalities (Minzu University of China), 167 cm tall, thin and long-faced, dark-yellow eyes, small dots, Yunnan accent
Zheng Xuguang	Male	20	Native of Mi County, Henan Province	Lives in No. 56, North Lane, Huancheng West Road, Xi'an, student of Beijing University of Aeronautics and Astronautics, 181 cm tall, weighing 63 kilograms, long round face, sharp chin, big ears
Ma Shaofang	Male	November 1964	Jiangsu	Student of Beijing Film Academy, 167 cm tall, lean, long-faced, sharp chin, dark complexion, wears glasses
Yang Tao	Male	19	Fuzhou, Fujian Province	Student of Department of History at Peking University. 170 cm tall, thin, high cheekbones, wears glasses, speaks Mandarin
Wang Zhixing	Male	November 1967	Shanxi	Student of the China University of Political Science and Law, lives in Shanxi Yuci City Textile Industry School, 169 cm tall, long hair, wears glasses
Feng Congde	Male	5 March 1966	Sichuan	Graduate student of Institute of Remote Sensing at Peking University, lean, darker complexion, large nose
Wang Chaohua	Female	37	Unknown	Graduate student of Chinese Academy of Social Sciences, 163 cm tall, relatively thin, with a relatively flat face, triangular eyes, short hair
Wang Youcai	Male	June 1966	Zhejiang	Graduate student of Department of Physics at Peking University
Zhang Zhiqing	Male	June 1964	Taiyuan City, Shanxi Province	Student of the China University of Political Science and Law
Zhang Boli	Male	26	Wang Kui County, Heilongjiang Province	Student of Peking University, more fat, round face, thick lips, northeastern accent
Li Lu	Male	6 April 1966	Tangshan, Hebei Province	Student of Nanking University, 174 cm tall, medium build with square chin, prominent lower teeth
Zhang Ming	Male	April 1965	Jilin	Student of Department of Auto Engineering at Tsinghua University
Xiong Wei	Male	July 1966	Yingcheng County, Hubei Province	Student of Department of Radio at Tsinghua University, lives in Beijing
Xiong Yan	Male	1 September 1964	Hunan	Graduate student of Department of Law at Peking University, lives in Hunan Shuangfeng County

The 21 most wanted student leaders faces and descriptions were broadcast on television as well and were constantly looped. Arrests were also broadcast, such as that of Most Wanted No. 21 Xiong Yan.

Not all of the 21 most wanted are as well known as Chai Ling or Wang Dan. Others such Zhang Zhiqing have essentially disappeared. After his initial arrest in January 1991 and subsequent release, nothing further is known about his situation and where he lives now. Zhang Zhiqing's role and reason for being listed on the list of 21 most wanted is generally unknown; this is the case for many others on the list such Wang Chaohua. Other dissidents that are not as well known to the public include Zhou Fengsuo and Wang Zhengyun. Zhou Fengsuo was a physics student at Tsinghua University and a member of the Standing Committee of the Beijing Students Autonomous Federation during the protests. Fengsuo was turned in by his sister and arrested on June 13, 1989, in Xi'an. He was imprisoned for one year before being released in 1990 due to international pressures, along with 97 other political prisoners. Leaving China for the United States, he attended the University of Chicago. Steady in his activist roots he co-founded Humanitarian China, an organization that promotes rule of law in China and also raises money for Chinese political prisoners. Wang Zhengyun was a student of the Central University for Nationalities and was the only member of the Kucong ethnicity minority group to be studying at a university. Zhengyun was arrested in July 1989 and released two years later. He was sent back to his village in the Yunnan countryside. In December 1998, Wang was one of 19 dissidents, including Zhai Weimin, who staged a hunger strike to protest the oppression of CDP members and other dissidents.

Ma Shaofang and Yang Tao are another pair of dissidents that lack public attention despite their constant activist efforts. Ma Shaofang was a student of the Beijing Film Academy during the protests and turned himself in on 13 June 1989. In October 1990 he was sentenced to three years in prison for counterrevolutionary incitement. In May 1994, he participated with Wang Dan and other dissidents in a petition to the National People's Congress calling for a reassessment of 4 June. He has had issues in attempting to open a business and has had a series of short lived jobs ever since and is living in Shenzhen. Yang Tao, who was at one time the head of Beijing University's Autonomous Student Federation, remains in China today. He was initially charged as being an instigator of the counterrevolutionary rebellion and imprisoned for one year on 16 June 1989. In 1998, he wrote an open letter asking for the release of Wang Youcai. His continued efforts landed him in prison in 1999 after lobbying for the government to reverse the labeling of the protest as a "counterrevolutionary rebellion". He was originally arrested on charges of "incitement to overthrow state political power." However, he was indicted on amended charges of tax evasion on 23 December due to lack of evidence and on 5 January 2003 was sentenced to four years in prison. He was released in May 2003. Yang too has had trouble earning a living.

=== Aftermath ===
Each of the 21 students faced diverse experiences after their arrests or escapes; while some remain abroad with no intent to return, others have chosen to stay indefinitely such as Zhang Ming. Only 7 of the 21 were able to escape, the remainder of the 21 student leaders were apprehended and incarcerated. Zhou Fengsuo was turned in by his own sister and arrested on 13 June 1989 in Xi'an. He was imprisoned for one year before being released in 1990 due to international pressures, along with 97 other political prisoners. Some served longer sentences than others, such as Wang Dan, one of the most visible leaders during the protests topping the most wanted list. Wang Dan continued his activist efforts after his parole release and was subsequently sentenced to 11 years for subversion. Liu Gang, who was arrested in Baoding in mid June, attempted to organize his fellow prisoners in defiance, by conducting a hunger strike. He had his arms lashed behind his back in a harsh position for several days while in prison. Many of those who initially escaped from the most wanted list were assisted by Operation Yellowbird and fled to the West. Those who escaped remain in exile today and have opened up about their experiences. Zhang Boli, number 17 on the list wrote a book titled "Escape From China" that details his experience during the protests and his escape. Those who escaped, whether it was in 1989 or after, generally have had difficulty re-entering China, even up to this day. The Chinese government prefers to leave the dissidents in exile. Those who attempt to re-enter, such as Wu'er Kaixi, have been simply sent back, but not arrested. In 2009, Xiong Yan, number 21 on the list, returned to China with a visit to Hong Kong, a special administrative region of China, in order to mark the 20th anniversary the Tiananmen protests. Xiong Yan spent 19 months in jail, after his release he fled to the United States where he keeps in touch with Tiananmen activists and participates in pro-democracy events. Xiong was invited to the southern Chinese enclave by the Hong Kong Alliance, which has been holding annual candlelight vigils on the 4 June anniversary Tiananmen protests. Many of the 21 who are in exile have joined human rights organizations or are now engaging in private business.

=== Arrests and punishment ===
Chinese authorities carried out mass arrests. Many workers were summarily tried and executed. In contrast, the students—many of whom came from relatively affluent backgrounds and were well-connected—received much lighter sentences. Wang Dan, the student leader who topped the most wanted list, spent seven years in prison. Many of the students and university staff implicated were permanently politically stigmatized, some never to be employed again. Some student leaders such as Chai Ling and Wuer Kaixi were able to escape to the United States, the United Kingdom, France and other Western nations under Operation Yellowbird that was organized from Hong Kong, a British territory at the time.

Smaller protest actions continued in other cities for a few days. Some university staff and students who had witnessed the killings in Beijing organized or spurred commemorative events upon their return to school. At Shanghai's prestigious Jiaotong University, for example, the party secretary organized a public commemoration event, with engineering students producing a large metal wreath.

According to the Dui Hua Foundation, citing a provincial government, 1,602 individuals were imprisoned for protest-related activities in the early 1989. As of May 2012, at least two remain incarcerated in Beijing and five others remain unaccounted for. In June 2014, it was reported that Miao Deshun was believed to be the last known prisoner incarcerated for their participation in the protests; he was last heard from a decade ago. All are reported to be suffering from mental illness.
