= Defend Tiananmen Square Headquarters =

Defend Tiananmen Square Headquarters was formed on May 24, 1989. The purpose of this organization was to create a strong leadership to lead the student movement.

== Structure ==
Defend Tiananmen Square Headquarters was set up by a small group of people. More than half of the organizations were famous student leaders of 1989 student protests. Chai Ling was prominent as commander-in-chief for the Square. There were six other key members in this organization, but not all of them were in charge of the group's decision making in the organization, Li Lu, Feng Congde, Zhang Boli, Wang Dan and Wang Chaohua were elected deputy commanders and Guo Haifeng was the secretary-general. In order to form this organization Zhang Boli and Feng Congde had to take a huge risk by returned from their safe houses. They became two very important key members of the team, along with Li Lu. (4) Even though Wang Dan was one of the deputy commanders, he was hardly involved in decision making. Shortly after the Defend Tiananmen Square Headquarters was formed, Wang Chaohua left the organization and announced his resignation due to their differences in decision making.

== Oath ==
At 10:00 a.m. on May 24, 1989. Chai Ling led the formation of crowd in the annunciation of the following oath on the Tiananmen Square:

"I swear I will protect the republic and Tiananmen Square with my young life. Heads can roll, blood can flow, but the people's Square can never be lost! We are willing to fight to the last person."

According to Chai Ling's book A Heart for Freedom: The Remarkable Journey of a Young Dissident, her Daring Escape, and her Quest to Free China's Daughters, and Wu Renhua's book Major Events, Tiananmen 1989 at least one hundred thousand people gathered in the Square when Chai Ling took the oath. And some people joined them after Wang Dan announced the formation of the Defend Tiananmen Square Headquarters.

== Actions ==
Defend Tiananmen Square Headquarters established a variety of measures to protect students protesting in Tiananmen Square. Their first was the installation of a broadcasting system for establishing authority and issuing instructions to protestors. The system was used for a final time on June 3 to report the first acts of violence occurring on the square's surrounding streets, and to prompt the Hunger Strikers to remain passive. The system's use quickly expanded beyond its original purpose. In his memoir, Li Lu notes that early on June 3 the system was used to pacify agitated students by playing Beethoven, with the intent of preventing a violent outbreak among the students. The headquarters also chose to dedicate two hours of airtime per day to a free forum, during which any person could broadcast their thoughts to the masses. On Children's Day, the scope of the broadcasting system was further expanded to broadcast the headquarters' message of democracy to the children with the assumption that they would continue the movement once they entered university. Despite these usages, the students' loudspeakers were low powered, and easily drowned out by government speakers. The Chinese Communist Party (CCP), however, stated that the students in general installed the loudspeakers illegally, and that a small minority utilized them to attack Party and state leaders, disseminate counterrevolutionary propaganda, and promote overthrowing the CCP.

In order to fulfill its defence mandate, the Headquarters established a system of pickets (road blockades) and student marshals to control the streets surrounding the square. Scholar Andrew Scobell agrees with Li Lu that student pickets were effective until June 3 in keeping the People's Liberation Army (PLA) at bay; as between May 23 and June 3 the troops were ordered not to move on the unarmed students. Once authorized to use force, the PLA broke through student pickets and entered the square, demonstrating the inability of the pickets to resist the army. Once the crackdown began, the responsibilities of the pickets widened to include maintaining order during the square's evacuation, as well as physically protecting the Defend Tiananmen Square Headquarters leaders, which facilitated the escape of Chai Ling, Feng Congde, Li Lu, and Wang Chaohua.

Attempting to exercise effective authority, the Headquarters established a central location so that they could create security lines and be found easily. The intended use of these security lines differs between the English and Mandarin versions of Chai Ling's memoir. Her Mandarin version notes that the lines are intended to protect students, whereas the English version states they are for the protection of the leaders. Considering the English version of her memoir, Chai Ling states that physically strong students were chosen for security roles, such as the Maritime College cadres tasked with protecting the broadcast building. Many of these guards, however, chose to abandon their posts, claiming a lack of effective leadership and tangible results as their reason. To facilitate the security of the Headquarters itself, the student leaders only issued identification passes and established a double line of student guards. The limited effectiveness of these security measures was demonstrated when, on the morning of June 1, Chai Ling and Feng Congde fell victim to an attempted kidnapping by Wu Lai, in which Headquarters guards took an hour to arrive at the scene. The kidnapping was halted, however, once Li Lu confronted Wu, whereupon Wu fled. Considering Chai's Mandarin version, security lines were only established around the Headquarters and its associated structures with leaders, not around the entirety of the square with the masses. The student leaders also expressed limited confidence in their security system. Following May 30, student leaders fully expected the PLA to break their security lines in the near future, intending to arrest and kill some of them. The first half of this belief would come true, but the guards performed their intended task during the evacuation from the square, in which they surrounded their leaders and facilitated a safe evacuation.

To better provide food to protesting students, who were only being fed one piece of bread per day, the Headquarters established its own donation fund. The fund received some sizeable donations from Chinese Central Television, the private sector, and others. Notably, a Hong Kong concert raised one million US dollars for the students. However, since the various student organizations within the square maintained their own donation funds, accountability waned. For example, the Beijing Students' Autonomous Federation withheld one million RMB in donations when the Hunger Strike Committee took back control of the Square on May 13. Upon learning of these funds, the CCP's official stance was that donations came from reactionary forces and were used by the students in general to procure communication equipment and illegal arms.

Intent on increasing support for the movement, Defend Tiananmen Square Headquarters established communication channels with media inside and outside of Beijing. Given the scale and context of the protests, foreign media was plentiful, allowing a series of press conferences to act as a main communication channel, examples of which can be found throughout the duration of the protest. May 27 saw Wang Dan, Wu'er Kaixi, and Chai Ling hold a conference announcing their intention to order a withdrawal from the square on May 30. Concluding the conference, Wang Dan listed ten points which aimed to publicize the protest as a peaceful and patriotic push for Chinese democracy. This conference successfully found an international audience with such news outlets as The New York Times and The Washington Post reporting on it. June 3 saw Chai Ling, Li Lu, and Feng Congde hold another conference criticizing the CCP for using violence against non-violent students. However, this conference appears to have been overshadowed by the crackdown that immediately followed. Notably, Chai Ling attempted to use an interview with American Journalist Philip Cunningham as a tool to broadcast the protest's purpose should she be killed or captured by Chinese authorities. This plan fell apart, however, when the interview was featured in the documentary The Gate of Heavenly Peace without Chai Ling's knowledge. Chai Ling criticizes the documentary for intentionally misrepresenting her as wanting to bring bloodshed upon her fellow students.

== Documents and events ==
The Defend Tiananmen Square Headquarters released several documents during the 1989 Tiananmen Square protests of 1989.

- On May 24, 1989, the Defend Tiananmen Square Headquarters was formed. Wang Dan announced the formation of the Defend Tiananmen Square Headquarters, and Chai Ling lad students in the square took an oath. They made four decisions: 1. The organization will be responsible for the student safety in Tiananmen Square. 2. Chai Ling was chosen as the commander-in-chief. 3. Within 48 hours, the headquarters should finish reorganizing the Square. 4. From now on, all decision making meetings would have representatives from student groups, worker groups and business community.
- On May 26, 1989, the Defend Tiananmen Square Headquarters invited students from Chinese Conservatory of Music to perform to help students in the Square to relax. Pop song singer Hou Dejian came to the square as well.
- At 7:00 p.m. on May 28, 1989, the Defend Tiananmen Square Headquarters announced the students will stay in the Square until June 20. Wang Dan, student leader and also the deputy commander, disagreed with this decision and left the headquarters.
- On May 29, 1989, the deputy commander of The Defend Tiananmen Square Headquarters Feng Congde admitted the headquarters had some problems of managing the donations they had received. He promised the headquarters would form a supervisory team to fix the mess.
- On May 30, 1989. Feng Congde and Li Lu formed a new organization, and commander-in-chief Chai Ling could not be found anywhere in the square. The headquarters was planning to have a victory parade, but no one was organizing it.
- On June 1, 1989, the Defend Tiananmen Square Headquarters held a press conference to report that Commander-in-chief Chai Ling and her husband Feng Congde were almost got kidnapped by three unknown "students". They believed those men were sent by the government to damage the student organization.
- On June 2, 1989. The commander-in-chief Chai Ling represent the Defend Tiananmen Square Headquarters accepted the interview of Phillip J. Cunningham. And later this interview was played by the BBC News. She introduced the situation of Government kept ignore the students demands to the British audiences, and the hunger strike situation in China. She was hoping people in other countries could support their activities.
- On June 3, 1989, an "Emergency Mobilization Order" was issued in the name of the Defend Tiananmen Square Headquarters. The "Emergency Mobilization Order" reaffirmed the idea of "Overthrowing the Li Peng's Government" and they wanted Chinese people to always remember the behavior of Li Peng's government. And they were hoping the army would choose the student side rather than the "Fake Government's" side.

== See also ==
- Finances of Student Organizations during the Tiananmen Square Protests of 1989
