= Women's roles during the 1989 Tiananmen Square protests and massacre =

Many women participated in the Tiananmen Square Protests of 1989 for democratic reform in China. Lee Feigon states "women [during the Tiananmen Square Protests] were relegated for the most part to traditional support roles." Chai Ling and Wang Chaohua, however, were female student leaders taking part in leadership activities during the pro-democracy movement. Ranging from student leaders to intellectuals, many women contributed their opinions and leadership skills to the movement. Although women had substantial roles, they had different standpoints regarding the hunger strike movement on May 13.

== Student leaders ==
=== Chai Ling ===
Chai Ling was a leader in the hunger strike movement and the commander-in-chief of Defend Tiananmen Square Headquarters. She assumed her role as a leader because she was seen as a candidate who could get men to put aside their arguments, and she became the liaison between the general student population at Beida and the Preparatory Committee.

In early May, Chai Ling became a hunger strike leader. When the hunger strike was initiated on May 12, Chai's speech convinced several hundred students to add their names to the list of those willing to begin a hunger strike. Li Lu called her speech the "manifesto of the student hunger strikers." Shen Tong commented that Chai was a charismatic leader who "could move you to tears with her speeches." Chai Ling explained in an interview that the hunger strike was "for the purpose of seeing just what the true face of the government is, to see whether it intends to suppress the movement or to ignore it, to see whether the people have a conscience or not, to see if China still has a conscience or not, if it has hope or not."

Chai also attended the May 13 meeting with Yan Mingfu, the head of the CCP Central Committee's United Front Work Department. The purpose of the meeting was to hear the opinions of the students and to persuade students to withdraw from the Square before Mikhail Gorbachev's arrival. Chai became the general commander of the Hunger Strike Headquarters on May 15. On May 18, many student leaders decided to end the hunger strike because they feared the government would impose martial law upon the students. The student leaders then held a vote to decide if participants should end the hunger strike or not. Chai Ling, Zhang Boli, and Li Lu asked the students to vote on the proposal, and many favoured ending the strike.

=== Wang Chaohua ===
Wang Chaohua was a member of Beijing Students' Autonomous Federation. She was more invested in organizational work than participating in demonstrations. She criticized the hunger strike movement and persuaded Chai Ling to call off the hunger strike. Wang was concerned that the hunger strike would "provoke a hard-line response and possibly lead to bloodshed." Chai responded, "The hunger strike was spontaneously initiated by students. No one has the right to stop it."

Wang also participated in the May 13 meeting with Yan Mingfu to publicly discuss the students' views on the hunger strike and the movement itself. Along with Wang Dan and Wu'er Kaixi, she also attended the May 14 meeting that concluded that the Communist Party Central Committee would not hold the welcome ceremony for Gorbachev's state visit at Tiananmen Square, regardless of whether the students withdrew. On that same day, she went to Dai Qing to organize a meeting with eleven other intellectuals – Yu Haocheng, Li Honglin, Wen Yuankai, Li Zehou, Li Tuo, Yan Jiaqi, Liu Zaifu, Bao Zunxin, Su Xiaokang, Su Wei, and Mai Tianshu – to persuade the students to stop hunger striking. Wang reportedly cried and asked the intellectuals to use their influence to persuade the hunger strikers to leave the square. Dai Qing and the intellectuals tried to stop the students, but were unsuccessful.

In her interview with Wang Dan and Li Minqi on February 21, 1999, Wang stated that the final outcome of the movement in 1989 could have been "less disastrous" if the hunger strike had not occurred.

== Intellectuals ==
=== Dai Qing ===
Dai Qing was a journalist at Guangming Daily and the foster daughter of Ye Jianying. Tao Kai, the director of the commentary department, described her as a "turmoil journalist". Dai made speeches at People's University and "welcomed the pro-democracy movement as marking a new stage in China's search for democracy". She participated in the May 14 meeting with Wang Chaohua and the eleven other intellectuals. Dai suggested negotiating directly with the students to bring an end to the hunger strike. She phoned the United Front Work Department to express the intellectuals' willingness to persuade the students to cease hunger striking, and asked that the intellectuals be permitted to meet with student leaders in the Great Hall of the People. Dai Qing and others drafted and made copies of "Our Urgent Appeal Regarding with Current Situation." At the United Front Work Department, Dai Qing presented the "Urgent Appeal" and shouted an appeal to the students:

If we're going to break this stalemate, both government and students will need to make concessions. The government should make concessions first, and the students next. As for conditions, if the students are willing to trust us, we are ready to press the government.

Dai Qing, however, could not convince the students to stop hunger striking. In her memoir entitled "Tiananmen Follies: Prison Memoirs and Other Writings," Dai realized that "her stature and reputation were hardly sufficient to have an impact on the students' actions or to play the important diplomatic role that the situation called for." She and the other intellectuals were unable to resolve the crisis in Tiananmen Square.

== Unidentifiable member ==
=== Huang Qingling ===
In Jan Wong's book Red China Blues, she interviewed Huang Qingling, who was reportedly a student in public relations at China Social University and the commander of the Dare-to-Die Squad, a group sworn to protect student leaders like Chai Ling. Huang assumed her role as the head of the Dare-to-Die Squad because nobody wanted to take the responsibility. She ordered students to interrogate the ink throwers who defaced the portrait of Mao. On the night of the massacre, Wong was worried about Huang and decided to search for her. When she asked several students about Huang, the students replied that the public relations department at China Social University did not exist, and therefore she was unidentifiable. Wong speculated that Huang either gave a false identity to protect herself, or was a government spy. It still remains a mystery.

== See also ==
- Tiananmen Mothers
- List of Chinese dissidents
