= A Tiananmen Journal =

2009 book by Feng Congde

A Tiananmen Journal: Republic on the Square
- First edition
- Author: Feng Congde
- Language: Chinese
- Publisher: Morning Bell Press (Hong Kong first edition); Free Culture Press (Taiwan first edition); Suyuan Books (Hong Kong second edition)
- Publication date: 2009 (first edition), 2013 (second edition)
- Publication place: United States
- Media type: Print (Paperback); also audio book
- Pages: 608 pages (Taiwan edition)
- ISBN: 978-9-881-78048-5 (Taiwan first edition); ISBN 978-988-17804-8-5 (Hong Kong first edition); ISBN 978-988-16442-6-8 (Hong Kong second edition)
- OCLC: 369552980

A Tiananmen Journal: Republic on the Square (in Chinese: 六四日記：廣場上的共和國) by Feng Congde (封从德) was first published in May 2009 in Hong Kong. This book records the 1989 Tiananmen Square protests and massacre from April 15, 1989, to June 4, 1989, in detail. Author Feng Congde is one of the student leader in the protest and his day-by- day diary entries, record every activity during the protest including the start of student protests in Peking University, the activities of major student leaders, important events, and unexposed stories about student organizations and their complex decision making.

The content of A Tiananmen Journal is based on Feng's Memo of 1989 Student Protests (八九學運備忘錄), first drafted in 1990. To ensure the details of the activities are in correct order and what he heard from others during the protests was truthful, Feng started editing his Memo and adding footnotes in the following eighteen years, before finally publishing them in the book, A Tiananmen Journal.

== Synopsis ==
The book is divided into nine chapters:

1. Previous Stories
2. Accidental Involvement (April 15 – April 18)
3. The Establishment of Preparatory Committee (April 19 – April 24)
4. Five Person Standing Committee (April 25 – April 28)
5. In Charge of the Beijing Students' Autonomous Federation (April 29 – May 6)
6. From Low Tide to Hunger Strike (May 7 – May 13)
7. Broadcasting Station at the Square (May 14 – May 23)
8. Headquarters at the Square (May 24 – June 2)
9. The Last Few Days (June 3 – June 4)

=== Chapter One ===
It briefly records the 1987 student protest at Tiananmen Square on New Year's Day. Some of the students were angry about the "Ten Regulations" (十條) issued by the government on 26 December 1987 because the "Ten Regulations" restricts people's freedom of demonstration in Beijing. Therefore, some students organized a protest to oppose the "Ten Regulations". Finally, around 20 university students were arrested and given warnings. At the end of the month, Feng Congde heard news of Hu Yaobang's resignation and recognized that he was forced to resign because he sympathized the student protest on New Year's Day.

=== Chapter Two ===
On 15 April 1989, students were very emotional about Hu Yaobang's death. Some memorial slogans and radical words such as "Someone is still alive although he has died; someone has died although he is alive" (有的人死了, 他還活著; 有的人活著, 他已經死了) appeared on the notice board in Peking University. This slogan expresses two ideas. One is to criticize the governmental officers who ignored the need of the public. Another is to praise Hu's efforts on government reformation. To mourn Hu, around 3,000 students grouped in front of the monument at Tiananmen Square on 18 April 1989 and some gave public speech. At the same time, some military police stopped the memorial activity organized by students at Xin Hua Gate (新華門), where most of the foreign journalists were reporting the event.

=== Chapter Three ===
On 19 April 1989, the Preparatory Committee in Peking University was formed. The members are Ding Xiaopin, Feng Congde, Xiong Yan, Zhao Tiguo, Wang Dan, and others. Some of these members played main roles later in the student protest of 1989. The first job of the Preparatory Committee was to plan a protest to against the "April 20 Incident" because the government distorted the truth of the incident and covered up the fact that the police beat students. The student protest against the "April 20 Incident" organized by the Preparatory Committee, however, was unorganized as the committee members lacked experience.

=== Chapter Four ===
Due to the failure of the "April 20 Incident" protest, there was a need to improve and reorganize the Preparatory Committee in Peking University. After the election, the Five Person Standing Committee led by Kong Qingdong, Wang Chiying, Feng Congde, Shen Tong, and Wang Dan replaced the Preparatory Committee. To express the discontent of the government, many students started students' strike. Even though the students were boycotting classes, they emphasized that they would not giving up studying they boycott to attend classes.

=== Chapter Five ===
Under the nomination of Wang Chaohua, Feng became the third chairman taking charge of the Beijing Students' Autonomous Federation. Feng reveals that members in the Beijing Students' Autonomous Federation were not allowed to attend any individual news conferences. Wang Dan and Wuer Kaixi, however, broke the rule and thus monitored by some policemen in plain clothes. They were afraid that they would be arrested so they decided to seek the protection from the federation. They then became "committee in name" (掛名常委) with no real power in any decision making in the federation and they started to hide for few days. Since Wang Dan and Wuer Kaixi appeared in the news reports frequently, outsiders such as foreign reporters always misunderstood their roles. They thought Wang Dan and Wuer Kaixi were the representatives of the Beijing Students' Autonomous Federation and had the real power in decision making.

=== Chapter Six ===
While the student protests were last for almost a month and the government seemed to ignore the students' requests, the morale of the students dropped. In order to increase morale, Wang Dan and Chai Ling suggested using a more radical way to urge the government and a hunger strike started. Their suggestions were not approved by the Beijing Students' Autonomous Federation because the federation thought that it would be a radical and danger decision. Even though the federation refused to carry out a hunger strike, Wang Dan and Chai Ling gave their suggestion publicly in the "Freedom Forum" (自由論壇), a place inside Peking University where people can give speech and express views freely every night, to seek supports. Finally, Chai Ling's "Hunger strike letter" (絕食書) brought a huge impact and gained mass support.

=== Chapter Seven ===
After Chai Ling's "Hunger strike letter" was announced, around 800 hunger strikers were at the Square on 13 May 1989. Many hunger strikers fainted including some of the student leaders such as Chai Ling and Wuer Kaixi. Under the pressure of the student protests, Li Peng organized a conversation with some student leaders. Feng criticizes the conversation because it had no live broadcast and it was not wholly reported by all newspapers. Feng also criticizes Wuer Kaixi's performance in the conversation because Wuer Kaixi repeated saying that "student leaders and the federation were powerless and students at the square were derivate from the democratic process". Feng indicates that Wuer Kaixi gave the government an excuse to use military force because "student leaders are not capable of controlling students' behaviors."

=== Chapter Eight ===
The Headquarter at the Square was facing financial difficulties because the account book was unorganized and confusion. As the hunger strikes seemed not effective enough, some student leaders started to discuss the issue of retreating from the square. Li Lu suggested having an election and let the students at the Square to decide this issue. Finally, 97% of the students voted to stay indefinitely. Soon, there were rumors of military suppression and student leaders were on the black list. Therefore, the Beijing Students' Autonomous Federation gave student leaders one thousand RMB for escape.

=== Chapter Nine ===
During the course of the military suppression on June 4, one person witnessed that eleven students were killed by tanks. However, the Voice of America reported that 2,700 people were killed. Feng doubted about the veracity of that number because the number of deaths was given immediately after the military suppression at the Square. The protest was ended and Feng and Chai escaped from China with financial support from the Peking University's Preparatory Committee.

== Reception ==
This book is largely ignored by the academia because it is banned in China and it is not translated in English for those academics who cannot read traditional Chinese outside China. But some bloggers and journalists outside China have some discussions and reviews of the book. Liu Yun, a journalist from Radio Free Asia (Cantonese department) states that Feng's unadorned description of the protest and his self dissections enhance authenticity and creditability of the book. The publisher of Hong Kong's Suyuan Books and the contemporary Chinese poet Meng Lang indicate that the book is enlightenment and can be a reference for democracy development in Hong Kong. One Taiwanese blogger with the nickname Yuan Zhidan states that Feng's book is useful for clarifying the false rumor of the 1989 Tiananmen Protests because the book combines Feng's memories in detail in 1990 and impersonal footnotes from others' descriptions of the protests. Both subjective and objective descriptions help to restore the truth.
