= Red China Blues =

1996 book by Jan Wong

Red China Blues: My Long March from Mao to Now
- Author: Jan Wong
- Language: English
- Genre: China Studies, Chinese History, Communism
- Published: 1996 (Bantam Books)
- Publication place: Canada
- Media type: Print (Paperback)
- ISBN: 0-553-50545-9
- OCLC: 40854229

Red China Blues: My Long March from Mao to Now is a 1996 book by Chinese-Canadian journalist Jan Wong. Wong describes how the youthful passion for left-wing and socialist politics drew her to participate in the Chinese Cultural Revolution. Speaking little Chinese, she became one of the first Westerners to enroll in Beijing University in 1972.

However, her idealism did not survive the harsh realities and hypocrisy she saw in the China of the 1970s, and she abandoned her support of Maoism. She eventually worked as a foreign correspondent for The Globe and Mail of Canada.

Wong was an eyewitness to the Tiananmen Square protests of 1989, which the book describes in great detail. After the Tiananmen Square massacre, Wong interviewed Chinese dissidents such as Wei Jingsheng and Ding Zilin.

Jan also recalls memories of Madame Mao and the Gang of Four as they were imprisoned after Mao Zedong died.

== Synopsis ==
=== 1989 Student Protests ===
In 1988, Wong returned to Beijing as The Globe and Mail's China correspondent and witnessed the tremendous transformations reform and opening up have brought since her time as the first Western international student to China during the Cultural Revolution. She interviewed dissidents such as Ren Wanding and Fang Lizhi, who played a key role in the 1986 Anhui student protests.

In her writings, Wong was critical of Hu Yaobang, whom she describes as "a buffoonish character" and summarizing his political career as "just another party hack who proved once again that being heir apparent was bad for one's health." She expresses her surprise when Hu's death sparks a popular student movement for political reform. She follows the movement through its different stages, from the initial demonstrations, to the embarrassing Sino-Soviet Summit fiasco, to the dialogues and hunger strikes, to martial law, and finally to the June 4th crackdown.

Wong talks about the student movement, stating that "the students were merely aping their oppressors… they established a Lilliputian kingdom in Tiananmen Square, complete with a mini-bureaucracy with committees for sanitation, finance and propaganda… they even adopted grandiose titles… Chai Ling was elected Supreme Commander-in-Chief of the Tiananmen Square Unified Action Headquarters". Wong reveals that during the hunger strike, many students cheated and were in fact eating. She notes that reporters were helping the students cheat and covered up their actions. Her assistant Yan Yan, for example, expensed a whole case of milk to feed the students. Wong reported that "the students were hunger striking in shifts… they'd sit out a few meals until a classmate came to replace them".

As the protests escalated in from late April to May, Wong interviewed a young woman named Huang Qinglin, who was the female commander of the Dare-to-Die Squad, "one thousand fanatics who had sworn to protect student leaders like Chai Ling and Wu'er Kaixi with their lives." Mysteriously, however, when she tried to find Huang after the crackdown, she discovered that there was no such person named Huang Qinglin, and the school Huang claimed to attend did not exist.

Wong writes about the failure of the initial martial law of May 20, defeated by the citizens' acts of kindness which overwhelmed the soldiers with popsicles, shish kebabs and soft drinks.

Wong and her husband Norman Shulman witnessed the army's crackdown of the movement on the night of June 3. She writes that after some riot police were injured from stones thrown by civilians, soldiers began shooting civilians. Residents of government high rises near Muxidi "hurled dishes and tea cups from their windows" and were subsequently "raked with gunfire". Wong notes that the Supreme Court of China chief justice's nephew was shot in his kitchen. In the darkness and confusion, the army also shot some of its own members. Wong writes that "behind the 38th Army was an armored personnel carrier unit belonging to the 27th Army… driving in the darkness with their hatches down in an unfamiliar city, they inadvertently crushed to death soldiers from the 38th Army". Wong did not personally witness all of these details but accumulated information about them afterwards from interviews of survivors.

Wong and her husband returned to Cathy Sampson's 14th floor room in the Beijing Hotel, where witnessed continued violence from the balcony overlooking Changan Avenue. Wong records with great precision the exact time corresponding to each action happening in the avenue and square below. At 6:40 am on June 4 for example, she records that the Goddess of Democracy was overturned by tanks. She observed a pattern of soldiers shooting into a crowd, the crowd dispersing, then returning after a while to collect the bodies, and getting shot again. This happened repeatedly until it began to rain, and when the rain stopped, the crowds returned. Wong notes incredulously that "Beijingers didn't want to get wet, but they weren't afraid of getting killed".

Wong witnessed the Tank Man incident and discredits the Wang Weilin identity claim. In 1994, she learned from a Chinese journalist that Xinhua failed to find the man, who Xinhua wanted to use as an example of China's restraint during the crackdown. Wong argues that the other forgotten hero of the Tank Man incident was the driver of the lead tank, who did in fact "exercise extraordinary restraint".

In the aftermath, Wong interviewed many people affected by the movement, including Ding Zilin, whose son Jiang Jielian died in the crackdown. In a chapter titled "Professor Ding's List", Wong chronicles Ding's attempts to compile a thorough list of the civilian casualties of the event by contacting families of victims, leading her to form the Tiananmen Mothers.

== Reception ==
The book received mainly positive reviews. Publishers Weekly described the book as a "superb memoir is like no other account of life in China under both Mao and Deng." Entertainment Weekly called it a "deft intertwining of personal and historical perspectives makes for a riveting, human-scaled look at a nation so ambiguous to the West" The Los Angeles Times book reviewer Anthony Day praised Wong for her candid descriptions of Cultural Revolution-era China, but criticizes her unsubtle prose describing the Tiananmen Massacre, which the reviewer linked "to her inordinate fondness for breezy journalistic cliches." Day cites her sensationalist usage of words: the student hunger-strikers would make the world's media "go gaga over a David-and-Goliath story"; "the leaders were losing face big-time"; when the soldiers started to fire, "all hell broke loose"; and, on seeing the killings and the destruction, "I had to pinch myself to make sure I wasn't dreaming."
