= Tiananmen hunger strikes =

Part of the 1989 protest against the CCP

The first of two student hunger strikes during the 1989 Tiananmen Square protests and massacre began on May 13, 1989, in Beijing. The students said that they were willing to risk their lives to gain the government's attention. They believed that because plans were in place for the grand welcoming of Mikhail Gorbachev, the General Secretary of the Communist Party of the Soviet Union, on May 15, at Tiananmen Square, the government would respond. Although the students gained a dialogue session with the government on May 14, no rewards materialized. The Chinese Communist Party (CCP) did not heed the students' demands and moved the welcome ceremony to the airport.

On May 15, students officially created the Hunger Strike Committee to organize operations within the square. By May 16, there were 3,100 hunger strikers. Ambulances and medical help were readily available for the fainting students at the square. With local and foreign media being allowed to report on the student protests, the images of students chanting and fainting from the hunger strike activities created striking images for the world. Pictures of students willing to forgo their lives for their country were captured by media outlets and transmitted around the world, which led to global sympathy for the students' cause. Citywide support for the students led to mass protests between May 16 and May 18, which involved people from all walks of life including workers, youth, the elderly, and many others. Over one million people took part of the citywide protests in support of the students. The hunger strike ended on May 19 before the declaration of martial law.

== Origins and formation ==
The idea of a hunger strike emerged early on in the movement and came from numerous different individuals. According to student leader Chai Ling, she first heard of the idea in one of her classes from Zhang Boli, a visiting writer at Peking University. Zhang said that he was inspired by Gandhi. In addition, she was told a story by two men from the national security force on April 27 about a single hunger striker, who was easily chased away on April 19. Some student leaders heard about the idea as early as April 23 from Hong Kong students, who proposed a hunger strike. Student leaders like Wu'er Kaixi believed it was a good idea, but students like Li Jinjin, a master's student from Peking University's Beijing Students' Autonomous Federation, believed that the strike would set the movement back.

After the May Fourth protests of 1989, the protests lost momentum and students were beginning to return to class. Student leaders were looking for a new plan to gain the government's attention for dialogue. Two different stories exist about how the hunger strike was initiated. The first was at lunch between Wang Dan, Wu'er Kaixi, Ma Shaofang, Cheng Zhen, and two others on May 11. According to Wu'er Kaixi, he was the one who brought up the idea, at the meal. Among them, only Ma Shaofang and Cheng Zhen had both read Gandhi's biography. Chai Ling has a different story: She saw a debate at Peking University as to whether to stage a hunger strike.

To gain involvement from students for the hunger strikes, student leaders like Wang Dan went around asking individuals to sign up. This is how Chai Ling joined. Student leaders, who wanted to be part of the strike could only do so independently because the Beijing Students' Autonomous Federation did not support the hunger strike. By the night before the strike began, 40 individuals had signed up. Chai Ling gave an emotional speech at Peking University to appeal for involvement. This speech became the basis of the "Declaration of a Hunger Strike", which contained the "Hunger Strike Manifesto". By the time students entered the square to begin the strike, there were 800 people participating.

== Goals ==
The hunger strike was meant to force dialogue with the government by occupying the square before Gorbachev's arrival on May 15. The official goals of the students are outlined in the "Hunger Strike Manifesto", which was distributed throughout Beijing using cassette tapes and handbills. Below is the "Hunger Strike Manifesto":

We are doing this:

- to protest the government's indifference to the student demonstrations
- to protest the government's failure to enter into a dialogue with students
- to protest the government's unfair characterization of the student democratic movement as "turmoil" and the further distortion of it in newspaper coverage.

We request:

- an immediate and equal dialogue of substance between the government and the students
- an acknowledgment by the government of the legitimacy of the student democratic movement.

Time of the hunger strike: Begins at 2:00 P.M., May 13, 1989.

Place of the hunger strike: Tiananmen Square.

— Student handbills, Hunger Strike Manifesto , http://chinadigitaltimes.net/2014/05/students-begin-hunger-strike/

== Rise of student leaders ==
The formation of the Hunger Strike Committee occurred on May 15. The committee was led by Chai Ling. Her involvement made her a prominent figure for the rest of the movement. Other student leaders including Li Lu and Pu Zhiqiang also rose to prominence because of their involvement. The media's focus on the hunger strike saw the rise of popularity and fame among the student leaders.

== Significance ==
The hunger strike contributed to making the mass protests noticeable by global media. Moreover, it aroused sympathy for the students' cause.

=== Media attention ===
Louisa Lim states that the media portrayal of "the country's youth sacrificing themselves for its future shook many who until then had not been involved." The hunger strike garnered worldwide coverage. Foreign media came to cover the Sino-Soviet Summit. However, their attention was diverted to the hunger strike, as the mass sit-in at the square was disrupting the summit. Images of students fainting and student slogans stating that they were willing to die in exchange for democracy filled the papers and television screens. In addition, local press was allowed to report on the events positively. Therefore, there was local and worldwide sympathy existed for the hunger strikers, which drew attention to the mass protests.

=== Citywide involvement ===
Citywide protests involving peasants, workers, the elderly, and individuals from all walks of life began on May 16 and continued to the 18. They were disheartened by the government's lack of response towards the students. At its peak, 1 million people were on the streets protesting in support of the students. Workers also officially created the Beijing Workers' Autonomous Union on May 18 to create an official group that supported the students' protest. The Beijing Red Cross and local hospitals had permission from the government to ensure that no students died. From May 15 onwards, ambulance sirens could be heard at any given time. Individuals also volunteered and were involved in a variety of different roles such as: ensuring that help to the hunger strikers could be given immediately or guarding the hunger strikers. At one point of the hunger strike over 1,000 were hospitalized.

=== Conversations with the government ===
The students had two official dialogue sessions with the government: First on May 14 with Yan Mingfu, head of the CCP's United Front Work Department, and Li Tieying, member of the CCP Politburo in charge of education, and a second on May 18 with Li Peng, the Premier of China. In addition, there were 'unofficial' visits to the students by Yan Mingfu, who made an appeal to students on May 16, and by Zhao Ziyang, General Secretary of the Chinese Communist Party, who pleaded to end the strike, on May 19. It was Zhao's last public appearance as General Secretary.

== Other hunger strikes in China ==
The second hunger strike that began on June 2 was led by intellectuals and was inspired by this one. This same tactic was also used by student leaders during the 2014 Hong Kong protests, the next mass movement on Chinese soil.
