= Funding of student organizations during the 1989 Tiananmen Square protests and massacre =

During the Tiananmen Square protests of 1989, student organizations received a significant amount of support in the form of donated money, supplies, and equipment from both domestic and foreign sources.

== Donations ==
=== Domestic ===
Within mainland China, donations to the movement came from several sources: Peking University was the first to start fund raising, with students collecting money on the streets. Other donors included the private sector, trade unions and overseas Chinese, particularly in Hong Kong. The Shekou special economic zone donated more than HK$210,000. The businessman Wan Runnan, head of the Stone Group donated about 200,000 Yuan. The All-China Federation of Trade Unions was another source of funding. By early May HK$10,000 was received from the Chinese University in Hong Kong. On May 27 supporters in Hong Kong staged an all day concert featuring Hong Kong singers, actors and actresses that raised around thirteen million HK Yuan.

Donations came through channels such as pro-democracy fundraisers and other large events, which helped gather support for the movement. Donations included both money and other much needed supplies, such as tents and other basic necessities including food, computers, high-speed printers, and advanced communication equipment. According to Chai Ling, one of the top student leaders, in an interview that took place on May 28, 1989, these donations helped to raise the fluctuating spirits and morale of the students, giving an illusion of strength to the protesters and helping to improve the deteriorating conditions of the square.

=== Outside Mainland China ===
==== Hong Kong ====
In Hong Kong, then still a British territory, support for the movement was massive, with thousands of citizens rallying to support the pro-democracy protests. Groups such as the Hong Kong Alliance in Support of Patriotic Democratic Movements of China, and the Hong Kong Federation of Students played pivotal roles in fueling the movement along with pro-democracy activists.

The Hong Kong Alliance in Support of Patriotic Democratic Movements (HKASPDM) was created on the 21 of May 1989, a day when “one million Hong Kong citizens participated in a parade which lasted for eight hours in support for the mainland students”. Led by Szeto Wah, a prominent pro-democracy activist, HKASPDM raised support for the Beijing protesters through the use of demonstrations and fundraisers. The most well known of these fundraisers was the Concert for Democracy in China, which took place on 27 May and was attended by 300,000 supporters. The concert also included the attendance of several high-profile personalities including Jackie Chan, Anita Mui, Beyond, Teresa Teng, and Jacky Cheung. The Concert raised 14 million Hong Kong dollars (1.5 million American dollars), in donations for the Tiananmen protesters.

Other sources of monetary donations came from student groups such as the Hong Kong Federation of Students, a large student organization made up of several Hong Kong universities, who raised around ten million Hong Kong dollars. Other smaller student groups like the Hong Kong College Student Union also met in the early days of May and gathered funds and organized mass rallies and demonstrations in support of the Beijing students.

The Communist Party knew of these donations and Chinese State Security mentioned in a report submitted on June 1 that certain people in Hong Kong had raised 21 million Hong Kong dollars in support for the protesters, with this amount increasing to 30 million, and explained that these pro-democracy supporters were bringing money to the mainland in separate, smaller installments, with one support group carrying one million Hong Kong dollars being sent ahead of time.

Hong Kong would later become the base of Operation Yellowbird.

==== Taiwan ====
In Taiwan there was support for the protests, with people also donating funds. For example, Chiang Wei-kuo, the General Secretary of Taiwan's National Security Council, launched a movement “ to send love to Tiananmen” by donating 100,000 New Taiwan dollars (about US$3300) to the Tiananmen movement. Some members of the Kuomintang also got involved; Li Chang-Yi (黎昌意), a Central Committee member, set up a foundation called Support the Mainland Democracy Movement, which campaigned to raise 100 million New Taiwan dollars. In May 1989, Chinese State Security Ministry issued a report, which brought to attention the concern that the donations were not just out of good will, but that they were part of a foreign plot at work within the Tiananmen Protests underlining the controversy of some of these donations. The Communist Party believed that foreign agents were infiltrating the student movement and attempting to carry out subversion by promoting democracy in an attempt to pull China to liberalization, with donations being used to further this goal. The report later stated that in Taiwan, Ma Shu-li's Grand Alliance for China's Reunification under the Three Principles of the People had opened a bank account with the Bank of Taiwan. The purpose of this account was so that Taiwanese citizens and groups could contribute money to support the democratic student movement on the mainland. Acts of foreign support such as these, and the involvement of foreign government personnel helped to fuel the Communist Party's fears that the student protests were being influenced by outside forces, and would be one of the best justifications for carrying out the crackdown.

=== Rest of the world ===
Apart from the support from Hong Kong, in other parts of the world support for the Tiananmen protesters also took place. In the United States, Canada, Japan, Taiwan, Australia, and across Europe, large solidarity rallies were organized and open letters were written in protest against the Chinese government. Like in Hong Kong, these countries also contributed large donations of money in support of the protesters.

In the United States and Canada, overseas Chinese rallied in support for the Tiananmen protests, generating one of the largest cases of support ever seen from the overseas Chinese community.

The Chinese Alliance for Democracy (CAD), an overseas Chinese non-governmental organization based in New York, supported the protests from overseas with funds and organized rallies in New York and Washington D.C. By June 1, a report sent to the Politburo mentioned that the protesters received more than US$1 million and tens of millions of Hong Kong dollars from the United States, the United Kingdom, and Hong Kong, with the Autonomous Federation of Students (AFS) receiving more than 10 million yuan in overseas funds. The Central Intelligence Agency (CIA) actively aided the student activists in forming their movement, providing them various equipment including typewriters and fax machines according to a U.S. official. The CIA alongside the British MI6 would later go on to play a major role in Operation Yellowbird.

== Problems receiving and depositing donations ==
Significant funds were donated but it appears that a lot of this money was not received by the various Pro-Democracy groups. A large amount of the money raised overseas was sent to China as cheques or money orders made out to “the Students’ ”Autonomous Union,” “Hunger Strike Headquarters,” “Tiananmen Square Headquarters,” or even just “Tiananmen Square.” Such donations, even if delivered to the student organizations could not be redeemed.

== Escalating costs of sustaining the protests ==
When the hunger strike started on May 13, the costs of running protests at Tiananmen Square increased. At first the number of hunger strikers was quite small, around 300 students, but as their numbers increased so did the crowds that came to support them. The Financial Department of the BASF was spending 200,000 yuan a day on providing food, water and other supplies. Other organizations had their own financial systems and it was thought that the occupation may have cost several million yuan a day at its peak. Observers in Tiananmen Square have reported that a lack of organization resulted in a tremendous waste of resources during the hunger strike. Liu Xiaobo, commented that almost all of the drinks were thrown away before they were emptied. Half or whole boxes of fast food, half or whole loaves of bread, and other foodstuff were spread everywhere.

== Rivalries in Tiananmen Square ==
There were rivalries between some of the pro-democracy groups that occupied Tiananmen Square. The Beijing Workers Autonomous Federation focused more on corruption and inflation. They complained about the elitism of the students who wanted to keep their protest pure and initially refused to allow the BWAF to operate within Tiananmen Square. There were also disputes between different student groups. When the Hunger Strike Committee took over leadership on the square the BSAF which had raised nearly one million RMB during the first week of the hunger strike refused to hand the money over. Eventually they gave 100,000 RMB to the Hunger Strike Committee and kept the rest. Later in May the students established a new organization called Defend Tiananmen Square Headquarters to manage Tiananmen Square. Because of the intense conflicts among movement activists, General Headquarters had great difficulty getting money out of the BSAF.

== Allegations of corruption and financial mismanagement ==
The rivalries between the different groups and the absence of financial management resulted in allegations of corruption. Student leaders were even suspected of corruption. Thousands of (US) dollars of contributions, mostly from Hong Kong, had been flowing into the student organizations’ coffers, but no accounting had been done. The BWAF accused the student leadership of financial misappropriation; they claimed that the students had taken in enormous sums of money in donations from ordinary citizens and from abroad. The issue of student corruption was never fully resolved. Allegations were made that leaders, including Wu’erkaixi, Zhou Yongjun, Yang Huhui, Chai Ling and Feng Congde personally accepted donations. It was claimed by some that there was no control whatsoever on how these donations were handled, there is only the students’ word that they were used for the student movement.

== See also ==
- Operation Yellowbird
- Beijing Students' Autonomous Federation
- Defend Tiananmen Square Headquarters
- Beijing Workers' Autonomous Federation
