= Bill Wong (restaurateur) =

Canadian restaurateur

Bill Wong was a Canadian restaurant owner.

== Early life and education ==
Bill Wong was born in Montreal in 1920 to parents who were immigrants from China. His parents sent him back to China during the Great Depression, where he worked as a sweet potato farmer. He returned to Canada in 1937 during the Second Sino-Japanese War, at the age of 17. Wong graduated from McGill University with a degree in engineering, and paid for his tuition by delivering newspapers. After graduating, he briefly worked for Bell Telephone Company before deciding that opening his own business would be more lucrative.

== Career ==
Wong began his career in the restaurant business by working as a manager at Nan King Buffet in Chinatown. He opened his first restaurant, House of Wong, in 1955. It was the first Chinese restaurant in Montreal to be established outside of Chinatown, and had to rely on non-Chinese customers. In 1963, Wong opened a second restaurant called Bill Wong's, which popularized the concept of a Chinese buffet in Canada. Wong came up with the idea of serving Chinese food in a buffet format after going to a relative's wedding that served a buffet to guests. The restaurant was also popular for offering take-out and free food delivery, both of which were innovative at the time.

At one point, Wong owned five different restaurants in Montreal.

== Personal life ==
Wong was married to Eva for over 50 years, and had four children including journalist Jan Wong.
