= Wu Renhua =

Chinese scholar and activist

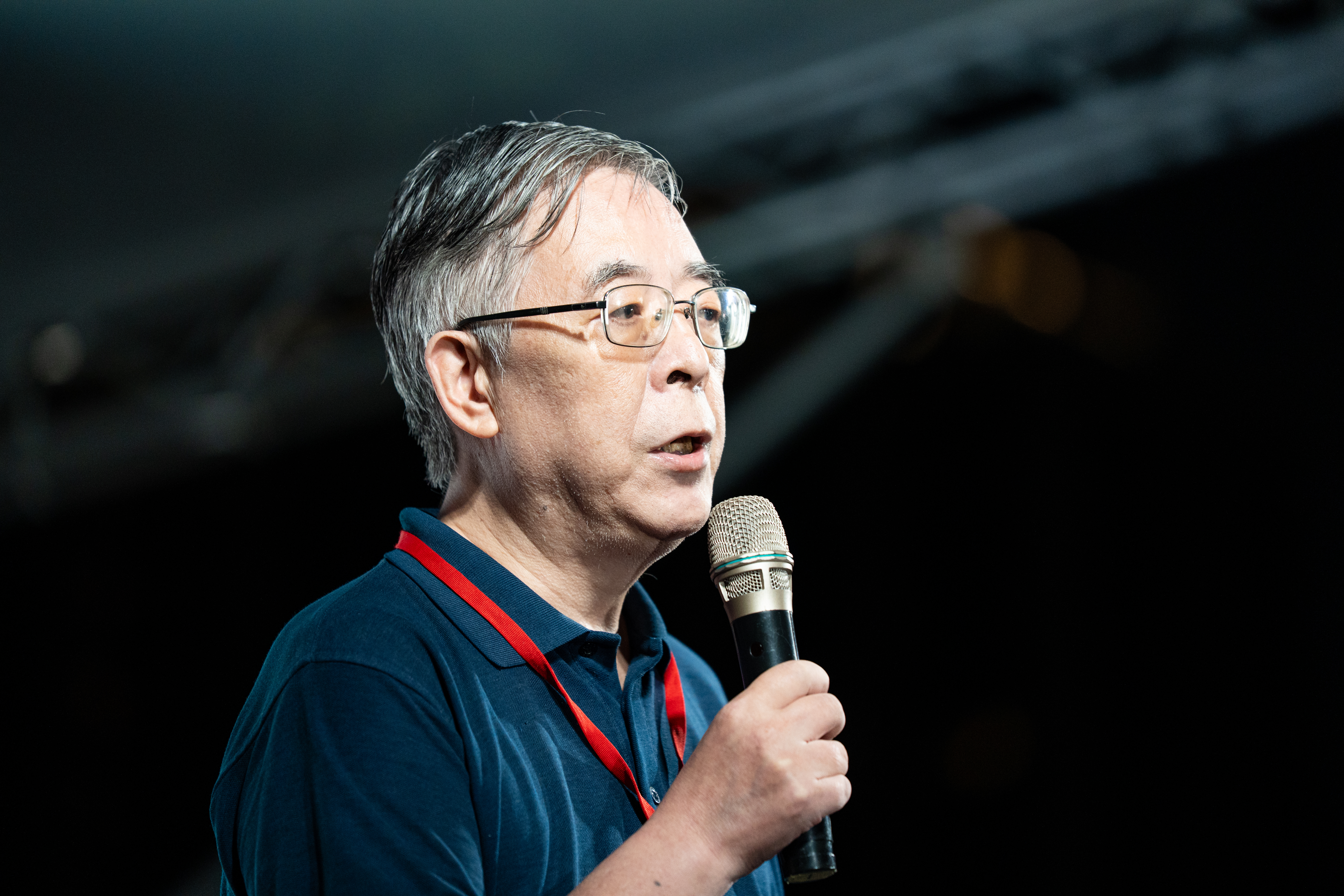
Wu Renhua

Wu Renhua, aka Yenhua Wu (Chinese: 吴仁华; pinyin: Wú Rénhuá; born September 12, 1956) is a Chinese scholar and participant in the Tiananmen Square protests of 1989. He has published three books about the crackdown: The Bloody Clearing of Tiananmen Square (天安门血腥清场内幕) in 2007, The Martial Law Troops of June Fourth (六四事件的戒严部队) in 2009, and The Full Record of the Tiananmen Movement (六四事件全程实录) in 2014. Wu now lives in California in the United States.

== Early life ==
Wu was born in Wenzhou, Zhejiang, China. After graduating from high school in 1974, Wu took part in the Down to the Countryside Movement and became an elementary and middle school teacher. From 1976 to 1978, Wu was a cadre in the People's Armed Police border defence force in Wenzhou. In 1978, Wu attended the ancient Chinese classical philology program in the Department of Chinese Language and Literature in Peking University. He received a Bachelor of Arts degree in 1982. After his graduation, Wu worked as an editor at Zhonghua Press for five months. In the same year, Wu continued his education in classical philology at Peking University and received a Master of Arts degree in 1986. Before the events of 1989, Wu was working as a philologist at Chinese University of Political Science and Law in Beijing.

== Role in the Tiananmen protests ==
In the spring of 1989, Wu actively participated in the Tiananmen Movement from the beginning to the end; an arrangement that protesters had struck with incoming troops enabled him to leave Tiananmen Square peacefully. He was one of the organizers of the first protest, and was in charge of the hunger strike petition in Xinhua Gate during the hunger strike period on May 13, 1989. After separating from the main hunger strike camp, according to Wu, he and other teachers and students from Chinese University of Political Science and Law stayed at Xinhua Gate for a few days; they entirely blocked the main entrance to Zhongnanhai. He later on received the message that Zhao Ziyang had already been deposed and martial law was imminent in Beijing. Then he immediately dispatched a trusted student leader to the Square with this information. In Wu's book The Bloody Clearing of Tiananmen Square, he claimed that he was also among the last few thousand protesters who left Tiananmen Square in the early morning of June 4 and experienced the entire force cleanup implemented by People's Liberation Army.

== Exile ==
Right after the events of June 1989, the Chinese government soon created a blacklist to prohibit political dissidents from entering mainland China. The blacklist consists of 49 dissidents in total; Wu was on the list. In March 1990, Wu swam 4 hours from Zhuhai to Macau, then arrived Hong Kong via the Operation Yellowbird. After Wu arrived in Hong Kong in 1990, he received support from two journalists, Ching Cheong and Liu Ruishao, in Hong Kong, and started to collect documents for his research on June Fourth. In the same year of July, Wu escaped to the United States through the Operation Yellowbird again.

== Life after Tiananmen ==
Wu participates in democratic movements outside of China. He was a committee member of the Chinese Alliance for Democracy, and he used to work for the Federation for a Democratic China, and the journal China Spring. Wu was also the chief editor of the Press Freedom Herald (新闻自由导报) for 15 years, from 1990 to 2005.

=== The Bloody Clearing of Tiananmen Square ===
After Wu's exile to the United States, he started his June Fourth research. Based on his personal experience and witness, Wu published his first book The Bloody Clearing of Tiananmen Square in 2007. In the chronological book, Wu recorded the entire cleanup procedure of the Tiananmen Square from noon on June 3, 1989, to 10 a.m. on June 4. To make the book more exhaustive, Wu included detailed descriptions of major events and leaders of the protests by citing other litigants’ memories and other related documents. Wu also demonstrated his thoughts on some controversial questions of the protests from his point of view. Wu was facing difficulties in publishing his book at first because the publishers he contacted denied his request. In order to publish the first book, Wu set up his own company called “Truth Publishing” and published the book by himself. He said that the book was the first book that includes a complete account of the clearing of Tiananmen Square.

=== The Martial Law Troops of June Fourth ===
In Wu's second book, The Martial Law Troops of June Fourth published in 2009, he focused on the military units that carried out tasks in the crackdown against the Tiananmen protests of 1989. As Wu stated in an interview by Cao Yaxue, after the student protests in 1989, the Chinese government increased censorship across the country, and he was struggling to continue the research because of the limited documents. Wu's personal experiences were significant to his research. In the prologue of his book, he credits his seven-year professional study of classic philology in Peking University and his experience of being a soldier in People's Armed Police border defence forces before studying in Beijing. This provided him with a background in Chinese military that helped him uncover the detailed information of the martial law troops. Talking about the research method, Wu stated that he spent a lot of time surfing the veteran message boards and keeping notes, such as hometown association sites, or alumni groups. He also posted messages like “seeking Old Comrades” on veteran websites and joined group chats of army groups. Wu also listed the martial law troop members who followed commands and received promotion after the event. In addition, he revealed a list of approximately two thousand members of martial law troops who took part in the event. He wrote that even if they are not responsible for the bloodshed, they are still witnesses, and it is their responsibility and duty to speak out on what they did and what they saw.

=== Family visit to China in 2012 ===
In 2011, Wu became an American citizen. On November 28, 2012, Wu used his U.S. passport to skirt the PRC entry blacklist and enter via Shanghai. The purpose for his trip was not related to politics; he wanted to visit his mother and relatives in China. Wu explained that his successful entry into China was because he held a U.S. passport, and if the Chinese government did not allow him entry, they might get into diplomatic trouble. He also emphasized that his entry into China does not mean that the PRC government's policies toward the Tiananmen protests of 1989 have changed in any way, and is unrelated to the changing of the CCP leadership, either.
