= A Heart for Freedom =

2011 autobiography

- First edition
- Author: Chai Ling
- Subject: Autobiography
- Set in: China
- Publisher: Tyndale House
- Publication date: 2011
- ISBN: 978-1-4143-6246-5
- Dewey Decimal: 248.246092
- LC Class: BV4935.C4

A Heart for Freedom: The Remarkable Journey of A Young Dissident, Her Daring Escape, And Her Quest to Free China's Daughters is an autobiography by Chai Ling (柴玲), one of the student leaders in the Tiananmen Square protests (also known as the June Fourth Movement) of 1989 in Beijing, China. The book was published in 2011 by Tyndale House, a Christian press based in Illinois.

== Synopsis ==
Chai Ling is the oldest daughter of a military doctor from Rizhao, a fishing village in Shandong province known as the “City of Sunshine.” She became independent and started taking care of her younger siblings at a very early age. Chai wrote that she was deeply influenced by her parents, who believed that knowledge was the key to success, as well as by her traditional grandmother, who survived famine. Chai worked to secure one of the five permitted spots for Peking University (Beida) in her province, and achieved the family goal of “going to Beijing.” Chai's family considered admission to Peking University the key to success and a guaranteed stable life, whereas Chai herself considered college a gateway to freedom, happiness and even a reform of her motherland. After entering Beida, Chai witnessed and experienced a series of troubling events, which shaped her view on the rule of the CCP as problematic, which all contributed to Chai's resolve to participate and later take a leadership role in the Tiananmen Square protests of 1989. The incidents included Chai being informed that her mother back home was accused by colleagues of stealing two expensive microscopes to exchange for her daughter's tuition, her three abortions, which Chai attributed to her ignorance about sex and birth control, and “rumours” being spread in attempt to ruin her reputation after an attempted rape.

Under the influence of her husband Feng Congde, Chai joined the leadership of the student movement after the former CCP party chief Hu Yaobang’s funeral was held. She became the only woman among the student leaders, and organized the hunger strike in response to the rejection of dialogue by the CCP. The hunger strike pushed the protest to a new high, with unprecedented numbers of students participating in protests ranging from fasting to marching. During the hunger strike, Chai turned to a Hong Kong–based reporter named Philip Cunningham to record her experience and thoughts about the movement. She claimed that she put total trust in Cunningham without knowing who he was. Chai claims that the videotape was later released to the public without her approval in the documentary Gate of Heavenly Peace, which Chai believed was selectively edited and generated false assumptions about her intentions and actions. According to Chai, the documentary suggested she “exposed her student followers to bloodshed and death” and “minimized the fact that she stayed until the last hour” in the protests. Chai recalled that after the CCP announced the imposition of martial law, intense disagreement over staying or leaving the square and a shift of intentions among student leaders put her into a dilemma, but she finally decided to call for an evacuation of the square when PLA troops advanced. Chai claims that infantry, tank crewmen and machine guns were shooting randomly at the unarmed citizens in the square; thousands of innocent lives were sacrificed as the price of showing up in the square on the night of June 4, 1989. The CCP labeled her a “counterrevolutionary rioter” and the most-wanted female fugitive after the protest was violently crushed.

In the third part of the book, Chai details her life after the Tiananmen crackdown. These milestones included her escape to the United States via Hong Kong and France, her the separation from Feng Congde due to his abusive behavior, her adapting to a new culture, the education she received at Princeton and Harvard under a scholarship, and her marriage with Bob Maginn. She also portrays her successful establishment of her own start-up – a turnkey intranet portal and learning management system for universities, known as Jenzabar.com. Chai describes how she became a devoted Christian and continued her pursuit of democracy in China shortly after the twentieth anniversary of the Tiananmen crackdown. She drew attention to China's one-child policy and introduced the All Girls Allowed Foundation, in response to the gender-selective forced abortion and rise of sexual trafficking due to gender imbalance. Chai writes that she now believes that the Tiananmen Massacre was God's plan to reveal the nature of the Chinese Communist Party, and the transformation to a Jesus-following nation is the key to reaching democracy for China. Chai concludes by urging readers to invite Jesus into their lives.

== Reception ==
One critic of the book, author Eddie Cheng, wrote that Chai was judgmental and subjective about others in the democracy movement. Cheng doubted the accuracy and trustworthiness of the memoir, describing it as selective description of the truth. Cheng also believes A Heart for Freedom “lacks details, depth, and accuracy to be a valuable historical account.” Another critic, author Barbara Falconer Newhall, questions Chai's understanding of democracy, criticizing Chai's suggestion that China's transformation into a Christian nation is the key to reaching democracy.
