= Chinese Constitutional Reform Association =

- Formation: 2005; 21 years ago
- Website: www.xzzg.org/index.asp

Chinese Constitutional Reform Association (Chinese: 中國憲政協進會) is a political pressure organization founded in 2002 and officially established on October 11, 2005. It is currently led by Wang Dan, who was a student leader during the Tiananmen Square protests of 1989, and president Wang Juntao. Its famous members include famous physicist Fang Lizhi and former advisor of Zhao Ziyang, Yan Jiaqi. Its purpose is to push constitutional reform in People's Republic of China by political activities.
