= The Asian American Foundation =

American non-profit agency

- The Asian American Foundation
- Abbreviation: TAAF
- Founded: May 3, 2021; 5 years ago
- Type: 501(c)(3) organization
- Tax ID no.: 85-2050585
- Legal status: Non-profit
- Purpose: Asian American movement
- Location: Washington, D.C.
- Services: incubator, funder, organizer, media
- Key people: Li Lu (Chairman), Norman Chen (CEO)
- Main organ: Board of Directors
- Website: www.taaf.org

The Asian American Foundation (TAAF) is an American foundation founded in 2021 by a group of prominent Asian Americans and Pacific Islanders. Its stated goal is to support an array of Asian American and Pacific Islander causes and create a national infrastructure for a community that has faced an increasing number of racial attacks.

== History ==
Launched with $250 million, TAAF is described by organizers as the largest-ever philanthropic effort to support the AAPI community in history. The founders include Joe Tsai, Joseph Bae, Li Lu, Peng Zhao, Sheila Lirio Marcelo, Jerry Yang, Angela Chao and Jonathan Greenblatt. Its Founding Advisory Council members include Daniel Dae Kim, Lisa Ling, Condoleezza Rice, Jeremy Lin and more. The organization is chaired by Li Lu, and Norman Chen is the chief executive officer (CEO).

== Initiatives ==
According to TAAF's 5-year portfolio strategy, TAAF focuses on four core initiatives:

- Anti-hate
- Education
- Narrative change
- Resources & representation

In addition, TAAF's AAPI Giving Challenge is a multi-year campaign where partners can make direct grant-making to AAPI organizations, invest in diversity programs, support AAPI businesses, or provide in-kind services.

== Data and research ==
TAAF funds an annual survey Social Tracking of Asian Americans in the U.S. (STAATUS) and partners with organizations like the National Asian Pacific American Women's Forum (NAPAWF) and the Stop Asian Hate coalition to provide data about the AAPI community such as the AANHPI women state of safety survey and the Documenting anti-AAPI hate: Codebook.
