= Sheng Xue =

Chinese-Canadian journalist and writer

Sheng Xue, or Reimonna Sheng (Chinese: 盛雪; pinyin: Shèng Xuě; born 1962), is the pen name of Zang Xihong (simplified Chinese: 臧锡红; traditional Chinese: 臧錫紅; pinyin: Zāng Xīhóng), a Chinese-Canadian journalist and writer, and human rights activist.

== Background ==
Sheng Xue grew up in Beijing, and moved to Canada soon after the 1989 Tiananmen Square protests and massacre.

Xue is a member of PEN Canada, and also a member of The Independent Chinese PEN Center (ICPC), both of which belong to International PEN. She is a member of the Writers in Prison Committee of ICPC.

Xue is the Canadian correspondent of Radio Free Asia and the North American correspondent of Deutsche Welle (Voice of Germany). She is also a regular commentator or columnist for a couple of media.

In 2001, she received the Canadian Association for Journalists Award for Investigative Journalism, and the Canada's National Magazine Award, for an investigative report, "The Smuggler's Slaves", on the lives of Chinese boat refugees published in the Canadian magazine Maclean's. She is the first Chinese Canadian to win such prestigious awards.

In 2005, Sheng won the Journalism and Media Award from the National Ethnic Press and Media Council of Canada, for her outstanding achievements, contributions, and community service and in recognition of her efforts in promoting understanding the traditions and the interests of Chinese-Canadian communities, her leadership, courage and dedication for the promotion of multiculturalism, human rights, respect of human and cultural values, integrity and equality among all Canadians.

In 2001, Sheng Xue investigated China's most prominent smuggling case and published a book (in Chinese), Unveiling the Yuan Hua Case (simplified Chinese: “远华案”黑幕; traditional Chinese: 「遠華案」黑幕), which soon became a best seller in Chinese communities outside mainland China and created shock waves both inside and outside China. The Central Propaganda Department of the Chinese Communist Party immediately banned the book.

A collection of Sheng Xue's poems (in Chinese), Seeking the Soul of Snow (simplified Chinese: 觅雪魂; traditional Chinese: 覓雪魂), was published in Jan 2008 by United Writers Press, Hong Kong. The poetry collection has also been banned by authorities in mainland China.

United Writers Press also published a collection of Sheng Xue's essays (in Chinese), Lyricism From a Fierce Critic (simplified Chinese: 敌对抒情; traditional Chinese: 敵對抒情) in August 2008. This book has also been banned in China.

She also starred two Canadian movies, Small Pleasures (simplified Chinese: 浮云; traditional Chinese: 浮雲) in 1993, and Chinese Chocolate (simplified Chinese: 落鸟; traditional Chinese: 落鳥) in 1995. She also starred a stage drama (in Chinese), He Zhu Xin Pei (Chinese: 荷珠新佩), in 1997.

Sheng Xue was the Writer in Residence at Carleton University, Ottawa, in the winter of 2007, the Writer in Residence at McMaster University for the winter of 2009, and the Writer in Exile of Edmonton during September 2009 – August 2010.

Sheng Xue is a key leader of overseas Chinese pro-democratic movement and is an outspoken critic of the Chinese government's human rights record. She is the chairperson of June 4 Massacre Investigation; Vice-chairperson of The Federation for a Democratic China, board member of Forum for Democratization of China and Asia. She established a group "Ten Dollar Can" in 2004, which is to encourage people to donate Ten Dollars per month and send to writers and journalists in prison, as well as other political prisoners, in China. She is also a founder of China Rights Network, a coalition of a number of organisations united by their opposition to the policies of the Chinese Communist Party, including Falundafa Human Right Association, Federation for a Democratic China, Students for a Free Tibet, Taiwanese Human Right Association of Canada, Tibetan Women's Association of Ontario, Tibetan Youth Congress, Uyghur Canadian Association, World Federalists of Canada, and others.

On September 29, 2012, during a function held in Sheng Xue's home by about 50 Asian political exiles to celebrate the Mid-Autumn Festival, the Minister of Citizenship, Immigration and Multiculturalism, Jason Kenney, on behalf of the Canadian government, awarded Sheng Xue the Queen Elizabeth II Diamond Jubilee Medal.

On October 8, 2012, during the FDC's 11th Global Congress held in Budapest, Sheng Xue was elected as the Chairperson of Federation for a Democratic China.

In a 2025 conversation with the anti-communist media "Current Affairs Chunqiu"(Chinese: 时政春秋) Sheng Xue expressed historical revisionist views arguing for the legitimacy of Manchukuo, a client country in Northeast China built by Japanese army before WW2, saying that "at that time, Manchukuo was a fully modernized constitutional monarchy," and voiced support for re-establishing Manchukuo in today's Northeast China.

== Books ==
- Unveiling the Yuan Hua Case (simplified Chinese: “远华案”黑幕; traditional Chinese: 「遠華案」黑幕), Mirror Books, New York, USA, 2001. ISBN 962-8744-46-1.
- Seeking the Soul of Snow (simplified Chinese: 觅雪魂; traditional Chinese: 覓雪魂), United Writers Press, Hong Kong, Jan 2008. ISBN 978-988-17-2051-1.
- Lyricism From a Fierce Critic (simplified Chinese: 敌对抒情; traditional Chinese: 敵對抒情), United Writers Press, Hong Kong, August 2008. ISBN 978-988-17-2056-6.

All of these three books have been banned in China.

== Starring ==
- Small Pleasures (simplified Chinese: 浮云; traditional Chinese: 浮雲), 1993 film, Canada. (Reimonna Sheng as Zhao Qing)
- Chinese Chocolate (simplified Chinese: 落鸟; traditional Chinese: 落鳥), 1995 film, Canada. (Remona Sheng as Francis Huang)
- He Zhu Xin Pei (Chinese: 荷珠新佩), 1997 stage drama in Chinese, Canada. (Sheng Xue as He Zhu)

== Family ==
Grandfather Zang Qifang (Chinese: 臧啟芳, 1894–1961) was the Mayor of Tianjin from 1930 to 1931, and the president of Dongbei University from 1937 to 1947. He also held some other important government/academy positions in China before 1949, and in Taiwan after 1949.

- Father Zang Pengnian (Chinese: 臧朋年)
- Mother Li Guiqin (Chinese: 李桂琴)
- Husband Dong Xin (Chinese: 董昕)
