= Himalaya Capital =

Seattle investment firm

Himalaya Capital Management LLC
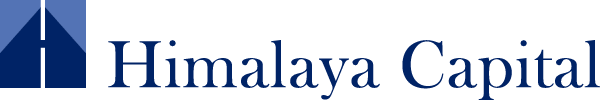
- Company type: Private
- Industry: Investment management
- Founded: 1997; 29 years ago
- Founder: Li Lu
- Headquarters: Russell Investments Center, Seattle, Washington, U.S
- Key people: Li Lu (Chairman)
- AUM: US$15 billion (March 2024)
- Number of employees: 19 (March 2024)
- Website: himcap.com

Himalaya Capital (Himalaya) is an American investment management firm based in Seattle, Washington. The firm takes a value investing approach in Asian companies mainly in China. It was founded by Li Lu who has been dubbed the "Chinese Warren Buffett".

== Background ==
In 1997, Li Lu founded Himalaya as a one-man hedge fund in New York City after spending a year at Donaldson, Lufkin & Jenrette. The firm had an inauspicious start as it focused on investing in Asia but due to the 1997 Asian financial crisis, it posted a 19% loss in its first year resulting in one of its largest investors withdrawing its capital. Li soon became tired of day trading and short selling which exposed him to unlimited downside risk. The firm took stakes in Japanese and Korean stocks that had been battered by the crisis which helped it recover and by mid-2000s, it had around $100 million in assets under management which allowed it to hire more employees.

Despite being one of the leaders of the 1989 Tiananmen Square protests, Li changed his views and strategy to make long-term investments in China. In 2002, the firm invested in BYD Company shortly after its initial public offering despite Li being forbidden from visiting its factory in Shenzhen as Li believed in the manufacturing might of China and the purchasing power of its 1.4 billion consumers. This would be Himalaya's defining bet.

In 2002, Julian Robertson provided capital to Himalaya on the condition it would make bearish as well as bullish bets on companies. However Li stated it was not a good fit as he hated having to "trade all the time" to adjust the portfolio resulting in capital being returned.

In 2003 through his human rights contact Jane Olson, Li met Charlie Munger, vice-chairman of Berkshire Hathaway at a Thanksgiving lunch and created a partnership that would last until Munger's death in 2023. Upon the advice of Munger, Li changed Himalaya from a hedge fund into a long-only investment vehicle that would use a value investing approach.

In 2004, Himalaya opened a new fund with $4 million of Li's own money, $50 million from other investors and Munger investing $88 million on the condition the fund remained closed to new investors. The fund produced very strong returns with Munger's $88 million soaring to become roughly $400 million. Investments include BYD Company and Kweichow Moutai. Munger has stated that Li is the only outside manager he has ever invested with and has described him as the "Chinese Warren Buffett."

In 2007, Himalaya moved its office to Pasadena, California to be closer to Munger.

In 2010, Li was granted re-entry into China as part of a trip to accompany Bill Gates, Buffett and Munger's visit to BYD Company to invest in it. Afterwards Li made subsequent trips to China, visiting companies and delivering lectures on value investing at universities. It was reported as of 2010, Himalaya had an annualized compound return of 26.4% since 1998, compared to 2.25% for the S&P 500 during the same period.

In 2018, Himalaya moved its office to Seattle, Washington which had lower taxes.

In July 2021, Himalaya sold 10.8 million of BYD Company H shares trimming the position to 6% of the portfolio for US$309 million in profits.

== Corporate affairs ==
Himalaya takes a value investing approach that is espoused by Benjamin Graham, Buffett, and Munger. Li's mantra is "accurate and complete information" which sometimes means going to extraordinary lengths to get a read on the CEO of a company being researched.

The office set-up of Himalaya is carbon copied from Berkshire Hathaway, where teams of analysts cover a handful of companies in detail and report directly to a central decision maker. Li calls analysts for one-on-one meetings to discuss investment ideas where he will eventually make the investment decision.

Himalaya keeps a low profile and doesn't actively court new investors as it already has a steady stream of high-net-worth individuals and pension funds to invest in it. Many of them gather in Omaha, Nebraska every year for the Berkshire Hathaway annual general meeting. Most of Li's personal wealth is tied up with Himalaya.

According to Li in 2020, Himalaya does not charge a management fee or fees for the first six percent return.
