= Yan Jiaqi =

Chinese political scientist and dissident

- 严家其
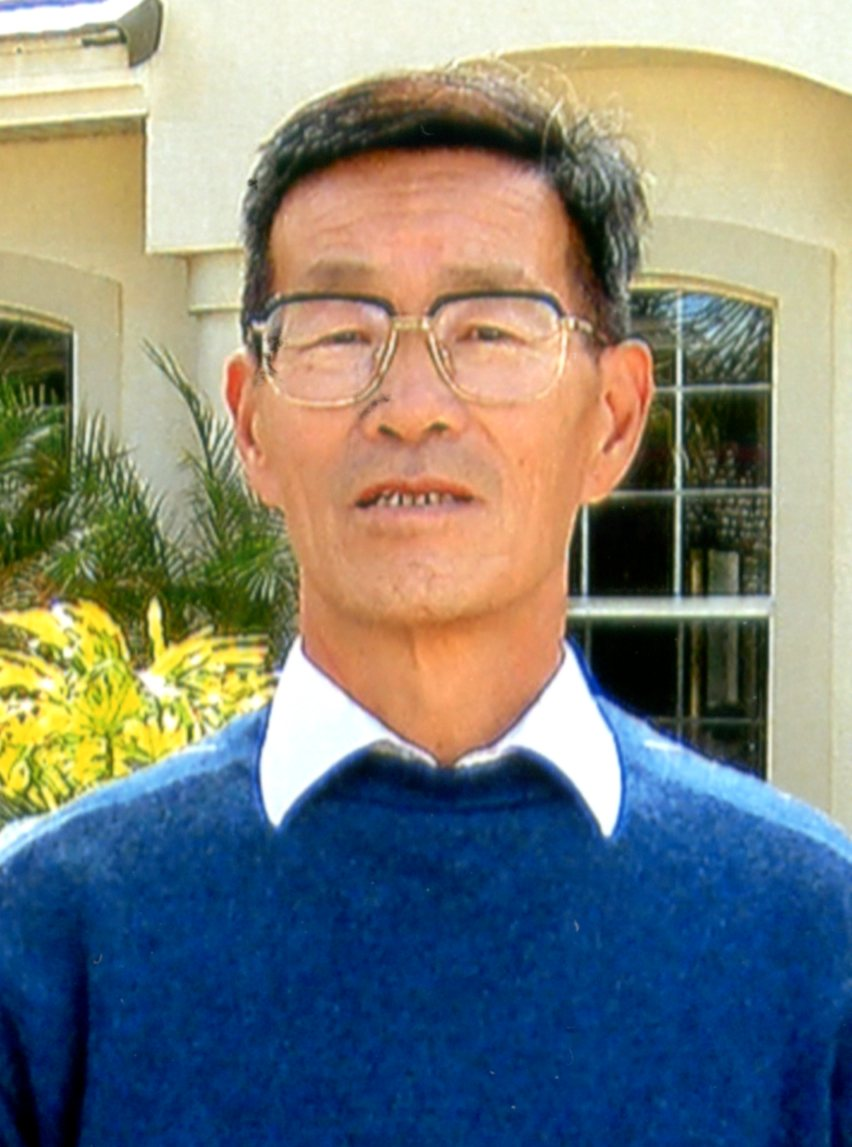
- Born: 25 December 1942 (age 83); Wujin District, Changzhou, Jiangsu, Republic of China
- Education: University of Science and Technology of China
- Occupations: Political scientist, dissident
- Years active: 1985–present
- Organization: Chinese Academy of Social Sciences
- Notable work: Turbulent Decade
- Political party: Federation for a Democratic China
- Movement: Cultural Revolution; Tiananmen Square protests of 1989
- Spouse: Gao Gao (高皋)

Yan Jiaqi (simplified Chinese: 严家其; traditional Chinese: 嚴家其; pinyin: Yán Jiāqí; born 25 December 1942) is a Chinese political scientist and dissident.

== Biography ==
Yan was born on 25 December 1942 in Wujin District, Changzhou, Jiangsu, during the Chinese Civil War. In 1959, he entered the University of Science and Technology of China. He later became the director of the Institute of Political Research of the Chinese Academy of Social Sciences, where he published several essays and papers on political reform. In 1986, he published a "theory of leadership". His most famous book, written in collaboration with his wife Gao Gao, was Turbulent Decade: A History of the Cultural Revolution.

He became a political advisor of Chinese Premier Zhao Ziyang during the 1980s, and was one of the leading intellectuals supporting the student movement in 1989. After the 1989 Tiananmen Square protests and massacre, he fled to Paris, France, where he participated in forming the Federation for a Democratic China and was elected the federation's first president. He was expelled from the Chinese Communist Party in 1991, while in exile.

Yan advocates for private property, constitutionalism, principles of judicature, and rule of law principles. He believes that these principles and market economy are the basis for democracy.

According to Yan, the basic goal of Chinese liberal reformers is to "alter the highly centralized system to create a socialist political system with a high degree of democracy."

He is a member of the Chinese Constitutional Reform Association and has suggested the formation of a Federal Republic of China.

Jiaqi is one of three subjects in the feature documentary The Exiles (2022) which won the Grand Jury Prize for Best Documentary at the Sundance Film Festival.

== Bibliography ==
Books written in Chinese translated into English

- Turbulent Decade Co-authored with Gao Gao, translated by D.W.Y. Kwok. University of Hawaii Press, Honolulu, 1996
- Toward a Democratic China translated by David S. K. Hong and Denis C. Mair. University of Hawaii Press, Honolulu, 1992
- Yan Jiaqi and China's Struggle For Democracy, translated by David Bachman and Dali L. Yang. M.E.Sharpe Inc. 1992
