= Federation for a Democratic China =

Canada-based political group

- Abbreviation: FDC
- Formation: September 22, 1989
- Type: Human rights and pro-democracy organisation
- Purpose: Protection of basic human rights, social justice, development of the private economy, the end of the one-party dictatorship and establish a democratic China
- Headquarters: Toronto, Ontario, Canada
- Region served: Global
- Members: 100 (2019)
- President: Chin Jin
- Chairman: Sheng Xue
- Website: http://www.fdc64.org

Federation for a Democratic China (FDC; Chinese: 民主中國陣線) is a Canada-based political group that advocates the democratization of China through opposition of the Chinese Communist Party and the support of human rights. It was founded on September 22, 1989, in Paris, France, following the 1989 Tiananmen Square protests.

The group has members all over the world, including mainland China. Active members are located in Hong Kong, Taiwan, Canada, the United States, Australia, New Zealand, Britain, France, Germany, Japan, Thailand and other European and Asian countries.

The group was very active in the five years following the Tiananmen Square protests of 1989 and was then substantially reinvigorated after 2003, with large congresses attracting a broad cross-section of leading Chinese democracy activists and exiles.

In 2005, Chen Yonglin, then Chinese consulate-general working in Sydney, defected to Australia in a formal claim for political asylum. Chen claimed that a network of 1,000 Chinese government spies was operating in Australia, leading the chairman of the Australian branch of the FDC to comment that such claims could "lead to [an] atmosphere of distrust and even antagonism towards the Chinese community."

On October 8, 2012, during the 11th Congress of the FDC, Sheng Xue, who lives in Canada, was elected as the president of the FDC. She was the first female president of the FDC, and the first female president of any major organization in the overseas Chinese pro-democracy movement.

On March 24, 2017, during the 13th Congress of the FDC, Chin Jin, who lives in Australia, was elected as president. Jin Xiuhong of the United States, Sheng Xue of Canada, Wang Dai of Japan and Zhang Jian of France were all elected as vice-presidents, and Luo Le from Canada was elected as the Chair of the Supervisory Committee.

Other former presidents of the FDC include Yan Jiaqi and Wan Runnan, who both lived in France during the FDC's initial stages and later moved to the United States. Wan Runnan later moved to Paris.

The group had 3000 members at its peak. By 2017, membership was reduced to 100. The group split in 2017.
