= Escape from China =

Book by Zhang Boli

Escape From China: The Long Journey from Tiananmen to Freedom
- Author: Zhang Boli
- Translator: Kwee Kian Low
- Language: Chinese Mandarin
- Genre: Memoir
- Publication date: 1998
- English publication date: 2002

Escape From China: The Long Journey from Tiananmen to Freedom is a book by Zhang Boli.

Zhang Boli was present in 1989 when pro-democratic students and rights-activists staged a massive protest in Tiananmen Square, Beijing. This is his story of how he was able to escape authorities who were seeking to imprison him.

It was published originally in the Chinese Mandarin language in 1998 by Zhang Boli. The English translation was done by Kwee Kian Low and published in 2002 by Washington Square Press.

Mr. Zhang is currently a Christian pastor at the Harvest Chinese Christian Church near Washington, D.C.
