= Chai Ling =

Chinese activist (born 1966)

- 柴玲
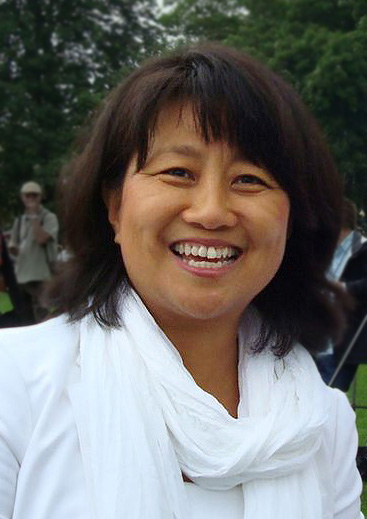
- Chai Ling (2009)
- Born: April 15, 1966 (age 60); Rizhao, Shandong, China
- Citizenship: United States; People's Republic of China (former)
- Education: Peking University (BA); Beijing Normal University; Princeton University (MLA); Harvard University (MBA)
- Occupations: President and chief operating officer of Jenzabar
- Known for: Student leader during Tiananmen square protests
- Movement: June 4th Movement
- Spouses: Feng Congde (m. 1987; div. 1990) Robert Maginn (m. 2001)
- Children: 3 (with Maginn)

Chai Ling (Chinese: 柴玲; pinyin: Chái Líng; born April 15, 1966) is a Chinese-American psychologist. She rose to prominence while studying at Peking University as one of the leaders of the 1989 Tiananmen Square protests. After moving to the US, she founded All Girls Allowed, an organization dedicated to ending China's one-child policy, and Jenzabar, an enterprise resource planning software firm for educational institutions.

== Life in China ==
Chai was born on April 15, 1966, in Rizhao, Shandong. Both Chai's mother and father had been doctors in the People's Liberation Army during the 1950s. Chai is the eldest of four children. In 1983, Chai Ling began her education at Peking University where she eventually earned a B.A. in psychology.

Chai met her future husband, Feng Congde, in January 1987. She became aware of Feng after his arrest on January 1, 1987 for his participation in a democracy demonstration, and met him a few days later on her way to the university library. Chai and Feng were married in the spring of 1988, though they were forced to alter their identification because they failed to meet the age requirements to be legally married. After their wedding, Chai was accepted as a graduate student at the Child Psychology Institute of Beijing Normal University. Chai and Feng became increasingly distant over the course of the 1989 Tiananmen Square protests, and their marriage ended in divorce soon after the movement ended.

== Protest and exile ==
Chai first became involved in the 1989 Tiananmen Square Protests through her work as a secretary for the Peking University Preparatory Committee, which had elected Chai's husband Feng into a leadership position. She rose to prominence as a student leader as a result of her involvement in the student hunger strike. Chai has stated that the idea for the hunger strike was given to her by Zhang Boli, another Beijing University student, but has also claimed that a member of the national security force informed her that a hunger strike would elicit a reaction from the government. On May 12, fellow demonstrator Wang Dan approached Chai and informed her that he planned to join the hunger strike, which at the time consisted of only forty members. Chai agreed to join as well, and that evening delivered a speech to the demonstrators that generated a large amount of support for the hunger strike movement, and enabled Chai to gather support from the student demonstrators and endorsement from the Beijing Students' Autonomous Federation.

The growth of the hunger strike allowed Chai's influence over the student movement to grow. On May 13, she participated in a student dialogue with the government that was led by Yan Mingfu. On May 14, a group of intellectuals were invited to speak to come as "teachers" of the democratic movement to speak with the students. The intellectuals' statement, Our Urgent Appeal Regarding the Current Situation, urged "calm rationality" to correct "radicalism and extremism." The students, particularly those engaged in the hunger strike, were offended by what they regarded as the paternalistic tone of the intellectuals. Chai interrupted the discussion between the intellectuals and the student crowd, broadcasting a hunger strike declaration and galvanizing the students against the intellectuals, who withdrew from the square.

On May 15, Chai was elected to serve as commander in chief of the Hunger Strike Committee, one of several student demonstration organizations in Tiananmen Square. On May 19, Chai announced the end of the hunger strike, a decision that was met with criticism from Feng Congde, Wang Wen, and groups of angry demonstrators. Chai and most other major hunger strike leaders went into hiding on May 21 in response to rumors of government troops invading the square that evening, but returned to the square the following day after hearing that no attack had occurred during the night. The retreat of the hunger strike leaders caused a power vacuum that was filled by the Beijing Students Autonomous Union, as well as new organizations which had been created. On May 23, the students of the square voted to transfer leadership from the Beijing Student's Federation to a temporary organization called the Defend Tiananmen Square Headquarters, which selected Chai Ling as its leader and made permanent the following day. During a May 27 meeting with other student leaders, Chai Ling and Feng Congde voted in favour of evacuating the square on May 30. At the press conference that same evening, however, Chai and Feng changed their positions and instead supported the continued occupation of the square. Chai claimed that the meeting had been part of plot to remove the students from the square and defended her change of opinion by stating that she had been pressured into voting to leave. Chai resigned from her role as commander in chief of Defend Tiananmen Square Headquarters on May 29, though she later resumed her position.

Like many of the student leaders during the demonstrations, Chai Ling was also a participant in some of the internal conflicts within the student movement. Chai was highly critical of the Beijing Students' Autonomous Union. In response to losing control of the square while in hiding on the May 21, Chai criticized the rival leadership group of lacking "leadership quality," opposing the hunger strike and accomplishing nothing positive for the student movement. In an essay given to reporters in late May, Chai reiterated her role as "chief commander" of the square, while also stating that she refused to make compromises with the Autonomous Student Union of Non-Beijing Universities and other student factions. In this same essay, Chai accused Liu Xiaobo and others of using the student movement as a way to "rebuild their own images," criticized many participants in the movement for lacking belief, and stated that China's intellectuals and theorists were "lagging far behind" in their understanding of democracy. Chai was also an adamant supporter of the purity of the student movement and resisted both the participation of non-student protesters, and involvement in the political struggle between government reformers and hardliners.

Unlike more moderate leaders within the movement, Chai seemed willing to allow for the movement to end in a violent confrontation. Chai's rhetoric in the square described the need to "awaken the Chinese people with blood and death". In an interview given in late May, Chai suggested that only when the movement ended in bloodshed would the majority of Chinese realize the importance of the student movement and unite, though she felt that she was unable to share this idea with her fellow students. Chai has since claimed that these remarks were taken out of context and selectively edited. She has also claimed that her expectation of violent crackdown was something she had heard from Li Lu and not an idea of her own.

When the violent government crackdown ended the demonstrations on the night of June 3, Feng and Chai escaped Beijing by train. The couple spent the next ten months in hiding, where they were aided by a network of organizations which aimed to help student dissidents. On June 8, Chai recorded a speech while she was in hiding at the Wuhan University which stated that she was alive and provided her account of the events of June 3 crackdown. In this recording, Chai stated that she witnessed at least twenty students and workers being massacred in the square, though she was unable to confirm the estimates of other witnesses. However declassified US embassy cables published on Wikileaks, contradicted this and concluded that the students were allowed to leave peacefully without bloodshed when soldiers had arrived to clear the square. Chai was not alone in reporting seeing a massacre in the square. Wu'er Kaixi claimed to witness two hundred students massacred in spite of the fact that he had left hours before the military arrived at the square. Li Lu also stated that he witnessed tanks drive over tents full of sleeping protesters, killing hundreds of unarmed students. However, Hou Dejian claimed that despite being present until 6:30am on June 4, he did not witness anyone being killed in the square itself. On June 13, the Public Security Ministry issued an arrest warrant which listed the names of twenty-one student demonstrators in order of importance. Chai Ling's name was fourth on the list, behind Wang Dan, Wu'er Kaixi and Liu Gang. Eventually Chai and Feng were smuggled out of mainland China and into Hong Kong via Operation Yellowbird. At the University of Hong Kong, Feng and Chai were put in contact with an underground rescue network that orchestrated their escape to France.

== Post-Tiananmen ==
While in hiding, Chai was nominated by two Norwegian legislators for the 1990 Nobel Peace Prize. As a result of her role in the student demonstrations, Chai also received an invitation to attend Princeton University through the China Initiative Program, an organization which aimed to provide educational scholarships for student refugees. While at Princeton, Chai studied politics and international relations at the Woodrow Wilson School of Public and International Affairs.

After graduating from Princeton in 1993, Chai began working at the consulting firm Bain & Company. While working at Bain & Company, Chai began dating her current husband, Robert A. Maginn Jr., a partner at the firm. The couple married in 2001 and currently reside in the United States, where they have three daughters.

In 1998 Chai earned her M.B.A. from Harvard and founded an Internet company called Jenzabar. Jenzabar provides ERP software to universities across the United States of America. She has been President since founding Jenzabar and Chief Operating Officer since 2001.

In 2009, Chai converted to Christianity. In June 2010, Chai Ling started a nonprofit called "All Girls Allowed" with the aim of stopping the human rights violations related to the One-Child Policy.

Though Chai Ling was reportedly working on an autobiography as early as 1991, her autobiography, A Heart for Freedom: The Remarkable Journey of a Young Dissident, her Daring Escape, and her Quest to Free China's Daughters, was not published until 2011.

Chai has been called to testify before the United States Congress 8 times, most recently on June 3, 2013. Her testimony has mainly related to human rights issues in China.

=== The Gate of Heavenly Peace documentary ===
Footage from a documentary titled The Gate of Heavenly Peace shows viewers parts of an interview between Chai and reporter Philip Cunningham from May 28, 1989, during the Tiananmen Square protests. In the footage, Chai makes the following statements:

Chai Ling: All along I've kept it to myself, because being Chinese I felt I shouldn't bad-mouth the Chinese. But I can't help thinking sometimes – and I might as well say it – you, the Chinese, you are not worth my struggle! You are not worth my sacrifice!

What we actually are hoping for is bloodshed, the moment when the government is ready to brazenly butcher the people. Only when the Square is awash with blood will the people of China open their eyes. Only then will they really be united. But how can I explain any of this to my fellow students?

"And what is truly sad is that some students, and famous well-connected people, are working hard to help the government, to prevent it from taking such measures. For the sake of their selfish interests and their private dealings they are trying to cause our movement to disintegrate and get us out of the Square before the government becomes so desperate that it takes action....

Cunningham: "Are you going to stay in the Square yourself?

Chai Ling: "No."

Cunningham: "Why?"

Chai Ling: "Because my situation is different. My name is on the government's blacklist. I'm not going to be destroyed by this government. I want to live. Anyway, that's how I feel about it. I don't know if people will say I'm selfish. I believe that people have to continue the work I have started. A democracy movement can't succeed with only one person. I hope you don't report what I've just said for the time being, okay?"

The footage has been verified by third-party media specialists as genuine, and is readily available online. Chai, however, claims that she had been misquoted and that the footage used "interpretive and erroneous translation". Declassified US embassy cables published on Wikileaks contradicted her later witness testimonial of experiencing a massacre in the square.

According to Keith Schoppa, Ling's comments showed the "depth of her revolutionary feelings" and that the film itself featured "much of the criticism of Chai Ling's zealotry." In June 1995, Chai attacked the film in the journal Tiananmen where she argued the film's producer made the film for "crude commercial gain by taking things out of context."

Chai and her firm have launched multiple lawsuits against the film's non-profit producers, the Long Bow Group. An initial suit, in which Chai alleged defamation, was summarily dismissed. An additional suit claimed that the organization infringed upon Jenzabar's trademark by mentioning the firm's name in the keyword meta tags and title tag for a page about Jenzabar on its website. Her lawsuits were subsequently criticized by some commentators, including columnists for the Boston Globe and The New Yorker. In the end, each of her legal actions against the film were dismissed by the Massachusetts appeals court. In its ruling the Superior Court handed an award to defendants of more than $500,000 in attorney fees and expenses, stating that Jenzabar "subjected Long Bow to protracted and costly litigation not to protect the goodwill of its trademark from misappropriation, but to suppress criticism of Jenzabar's principles and its corporate practices." in the ruling.

=== Religious discrimination lawsuit against Jenzabar, All Girls Allowed and Chai Ling ===
Jing Zhang, a Chinese feminist activist, sued Jenzabar Inc., The Jenzabar Foundation, All Girls Allowed and their founder and Jing's former employer, Chai Ling. Zhang had established her own nonprofit, Women's Rights in China, when she joined forces with Chai to develop programs to prevent forced abortions in China. Then, she alleges, Chai fired her for being insufficiently religious and for declining to engage in "weekly corporate worship."

== See also ==
- Women's roles during the 1989 Tiananmen Square protests and massacre
