= Jan Wong =

Canadian academic, journalist, and writer (born 1952)

- Born: August 1952 (age 74); Montreal, Quebec, Canada
- Education: Peking University; Columbia University
- Occupations: Academic; journalist; columnist; writer
- Spouse: Norman Shulman (m. 1976)
- Children: 2
- Website: janwong.ca

Jan Wong (Chinese: 黃明珍; pinyin: Huáng Míngzhēn; born August 1952) is a Canadian academic, journalist, and writer. Wong worked for The Globe and Mail, serving as Beijing correspondent from 1988 to 1994, when she returned to write from Canada. At the turn of the 21st century she was known for her Globe column Lunch with Jan Wong. She covered the Dawson College shooting in 2006 and her article was attacked by the public and even the prime minister. The Globe management did not back her and this caused her to have a bout of clinical depression. She was fired by the newspaper in 2007 without cause, but she had to sign a confidentiality agreement about the terms of the settlement. In 2012 she self-published the book Out of the blue about her time at the paper. In late 2014, The Globe successfully sued her for breaching the confidentiality agreement and she was ordered by the court to repay her settlement and court costs. After 2008, she took on various jobs including being a guest host on CBC Radio, and author of several best selling books. Into the 2020s she is employed as a professor at St. Thomas University in Fredericton, New Brunswick. She is married with two adult children and resides in both Toronto and Fredericton.

== Life after the Cultural Revolution ==
Wong was born in Montreal in August 1952. She is the daughter of Montreal businessman Bill Wong, founder of Bill Wong's buffet in 1963, and earlier of the House of Wong which was the city's first Chinese restaurant to open outside Chinatown. Towards the end of the Cultural Revolution period, she left McGill University and flew to China. As a committed Maoist, she became one of two foreign college students permitted to study at Beijing University. While at Beijing she denounced Yin Luoyi, a trusting fellow student who had sought her help to escape communist China to the West. The student was subsequently shamed and expelled. "She suffered a lot ... she was sent to the countryside for hard labour. When she came back, she fought hard to clear her name." Long after, having returned for a second visit after her own return to the West, and having eventually found Yin Luoyi again, Wong took comfort in learning she had not been her confidante's only traitor, and that she did not express anger. Wong wrote another book, and did interviews on her own experience.

Wong met her future husband Norman Shulman while studying in China and she married him in 1976. The couple have two sons: Ben (b. 1991) and Sam (b. 1993). Shulman, an American draft dodger of the Vietnam Era, had joined his father Jack Shulman in China and remained there when Jack and his wife Ruth left China during the turmoil of the Cultural Revolution. Shulman worked as a text-polisher for Chinese propaganda magazine China Reconstructs.

== Journalism career ==
In the late 1970s, Wong began her career in journalism when she was hired as a news assistant by Fox Butterfield, China correspondent for the New York Times. Wong became tired of Party ideology and returned to Canada from Beijing. She then studied journalism at Columbia, receiving a master's degree, and found work with the Montreal Gazette, Boston Globe and the Wall Street Journal before joining the Globe and Mail as a business reporter.

In 1988, the paper sent her to China where she worked for six years as its foreign correspondent, among other things covering the Tiananmen Massacre. She later chronicled her Chinese experience in a book, Red China Blues, which was promptly banned in China. After a return trip in the late nineties, she produced a second book entitled Jan Wong's China, a somewhat less personal account of social life, the economy, and politics in modern-day China.

== After China ==
From 1996 to 2002, Wong was best known for her Lunch with... column in The Globe and Mail, in which she had lunch with a celebrity, who was usually but not always Canadian. Her Lunch columns were often noted for publishing her theatrical take on the private, titillating side of her lunch companions — Margaret Atwood was depicted as a prickly diva who refused to eat her lunch because she was unhappy with the table, and Gene Simmons revealed the size of his penis. In one of her most famous Lunch columns, Wong took a homeless woman to lunch.

After Lunch with Jan Wong was retired in 2002, Wong moved on to other journalistic roles with The Globe and Mail. In 2006, Wong attracted attention by imitating the work of Barbara Ehrenreich and going undercover as a cleaning lady in wealthy Toronto homes. While employed by the Globe and Mail as a reporter, Jan Wong impersonated a maid, and then wrote about her experiences in a five-part series on low-income living. The newspaper published the stories in the spring of 2006. Members of a Markham family sued the newspaper and Wong, alleging they suffered 'significant embarrassment and mental distress.'

== Dawson College controversy ==
Wong published the article "Get under the desk" in The Globe and Mail on 16 September 2006. In it, she drew a link between the actions of Marc Lépine, Valery Fabrikant, and Kimveer Gill, perpetrators of the shootings of the École Polytechnique, Concordia University, and Dawson College, respectively; and the existence in Quebec of bill 101, the "decades-long linguistic struggle". She implied a relation between the fact that the three were not old-stock Québécois and the murders they committed, since they were, according to Wong, alienated in a Quebec society concerned with "racial purity".

Public outcry and political condemnation, and publicity soon followed. The Saint-Jean-Baptiste Society lodged a complaint to the Quebec Press Council. Quebec Premier Jean Charest called the article a "disgrace," which demonstrated a profound incomprehension of Quebec society and that Wong should apologize to all Québécois. Prime Minister Stephen Harper denounced Wong's article in a letter to the newspaper published on 21 September 2006 saying that her "argument is patently absurd and without foundation." On 20 September, the House of Commons of Canada unanimously passed a motion, by Liberal Party Member of Parliament Denis Coderre, requesting an apology for the column.

A few days later, Globe and Mail editor Edward Greenspon responded to the controversy. He wrote a column stating that Wong's opinion should not have been included in a news piece. A separate article, labelled as opinion, should have been published with her "pure laine" thesis. Wong viewed this as a betrayal by her employer, as Greenspon had previously read and approved her story.

Wong descended into a long period of deep depression following the controversy and, unable to work, went on sick leave. The Globe ordered her back to work in 2007, and withdrew her sick pay for the summer and autumn of that year. They ultimately terminated her on 4 June 2007. That provoked her to file a grievance that led to a confidential settlement, ordered by a labour board arbiter, with a lump sum payment of $209,912 – two years salary – plus the denied sick leave pay. According to Wong: "I wrote a feature story that sparked a political backlash, my employers failed to support me and later silenced me, and after I became clinically depressed, they fired me."

== Recent work ==
In the 2009–2010 season, Wong was an occasional Friday guest radio host on CBC Radio One's The Current. In 2010, Wong was Visiting Irving Chair of Journalism at St. Thomas University in Fredericton, New Brunswick, and is currently an associate professor there.

Her fifth book, Out of the Blue: A Memoir of Workplace Depression, Recovery, Redemption and, Yes, Happiness, is a memoir of her experience with clinical depression in which Jan Wong describes in detail the backlash she received immediately after her article appeared; and how the Globe and Mail management, in her view, abandoned her in the face of a torrent of negative reaction from all sides. She found the 'exact moment I began my descent into depression' when she was shattered by racial attack. This book was self-published after Doubleday, the publisher of her previous books, pulled out mere days before print although Doubleday denied any legal interference from The Globe; it was released May 5, 2012, and became an instant bestseller.

The Globe alleged that passages in the book violated a confidentiality agreement that was part of the settlement of Wong's grievance with the newspaper. An arbitrator's ruling in July 2013 ordered Wong to return her severance payment to the Globe and Mail. Wong challenged the arbitrator's decision in an Ontario court in 2014. In November 2014, the Ontario Superior Court upheld the arbitration award requiring Wong to repay the Globe and Mail her $209,000 termination settlement and also ordered her to pay $15,000 in legal fees to both the Globe and Mail and the union.

Her latest book is Apron Strings: Navigating Food And Family In France, Italy, And China. Published in September, 2017, it was named a must-read book by both the CBC and the Toronto Star. As Chris Nuttall-Smith (top chef Canada) wrote: "a sharp-minded — and famously sharp-tongued — reporter drags her fully grown, chef-trained son on a homestay cooking tour of France, Italy, and China. What could possibly not go wrong? Inquisitive, caustic, delicious, and can't-look-away entertaining, this is Jan Wong at the peak of her powers."

== Published books ==
- Wong, Jan (1997). Red China Blues: My Long March from Mao to Now. Toronto: Doubleday Canada. p. 416. ISBN 0-385-48232-9.(Contains besides extensive autobiographical material an eyewitness account of the Tiananmen Massacre and the basis for a realistic estimate of the number of victims.)
- Wong, Jan (1999). Jan Wong's China: Reports From A Not-So-Foreign Correspondent. Toronto: Doubleday Canada. p. 320. ISBN 0-385-25939-5.
- Wong, Jan (2001). Lunch With Jan Wong. Toronto: Bantam Books. ISBN 0-385-25982-4.
- Wong, Jan (2007). Beijing Confidential: A Tale of Comrades Lost and Found. Toronto: Doubleday Canada. p. 320. ISBN 978-0-385-66358-8.
  - US edition: Wong, Jan (2009). A Comrade Lost and Found: A Beijing Story. Boston: Houghton Mifflin. p. 320. ISBN 978-0-15-101342-5.
  - UK edition: Wong, Jan (2009). Chinese Whispers: Searching for Forgiveness in Beijing. London: Atlantic Books. p. 320. ISBN 978-1-84354974-1.
- Wong, Jan (2012). Out of the blue : a memoir of workplace depression, recovery, redemption and yes, happiness. Toronto: Self-published. p. 264. ISBN 978-0-9878685-0-3.
- Wong, Jan (2017). Apron Strings : Navigating Food and Family in France, Italy, and China. Fredericton: Goose Lane. p. 380. ISBN 978-0-864929617.
