= Wang Chaohua =

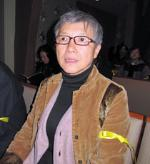
Chaohua Wang

Wang Chaohua is a freelance essayist and researcher, with a Ph.D. in modern Chinese literature from the University of California, Los Angeles. Now, she is an adjunct assistant professor in Department of Asian Languages and Cultures at UCLA.

Wang is the daughter of a former professor of Chinese literature at Beijing University. In 1989 she was an M.A. student in modern Chinese literature at the Chinese Academy of Social Sciences. She was a member of the standing committee of the Beijing Autonomous Association of College Students in the spring of 1989 during the demonstrations in Tiananmen Square and was put on the Chinese government's "21 Most Wanted Beijing Student Leaders" list. She spent more than six months in hiding before going to the U.S. in early 1990.

== See also ==
- Women’s Roles during the Tiananmen Square Protests of 1989
