= Zhang Boli =

Chinese dissident (born 1959)

Zhang Boli 张伯笠
- Born: 1959 (age 66–67); Wangkui County, Heilongjiang Province, China
- Known for: Tiananmen Square protests of 1989
- Children: 2

Zhang Boli (simplified Chinese: 张伯笠; traditional Chinese: 張伯笠; pinyin: Zhāng Bólì, born 1959) is a Chinese dissident.

== Biography ==
Zhang Boli was born in Wangkui County, Heilongjiang Province. He worked as a journalist after graduating from a three-year college in Heilongjiang Province. He attended a short training program for writers at Beijing University in 1989.

Zhang participated in and became one of the leaders in the late stage of the Tiananmen Square Protests of 1989 and helped organize the hunger strike that accompanied it. He was number 17 on the Chinese Most Wanted list for the 21 leaders of the Tiananmen Square protests.

After escaping from Beijing, Zhang spent two years as a fugitive in China. He once escaped into the Soviet Union, but his request to be sent to a free country as a political refugee seeking asylum was refused. He was allowed to escape back into China. He worked at a small farm in a remote corner of Heilongjiang Province. After a friend found a way for him to escape, he came down south again and was smuggled into Hong Kong. During Zhang's time hiding, his first wife announced a divorce from him in the newspaper and abandoned their daughter. He managed to visit his daughter briefly before leaving China.

Zhang authored the book Escape From China, detailing his ordeal escaping from the PRC government. He is currently a pastor in the Washington, D.C. area and leads a church called Harvest Chinese Christian Church in Fairfax, Virginia. He is married to his second wife and has two children from two marriages.

== See also ==
- Wuer Kaixi
- Wang Dan (dissident)

== Sources ==
- Zhang Boli (2002). Escape from China: The Long Journey from Tiananmen to Freedom. trans. Kwee Kian Low. New York: Washington Square Press. ISBN 0-7434-3160-X.
