= Feng Congde =

Chinese dissident and Republic of China Restoration activist

- 封從德
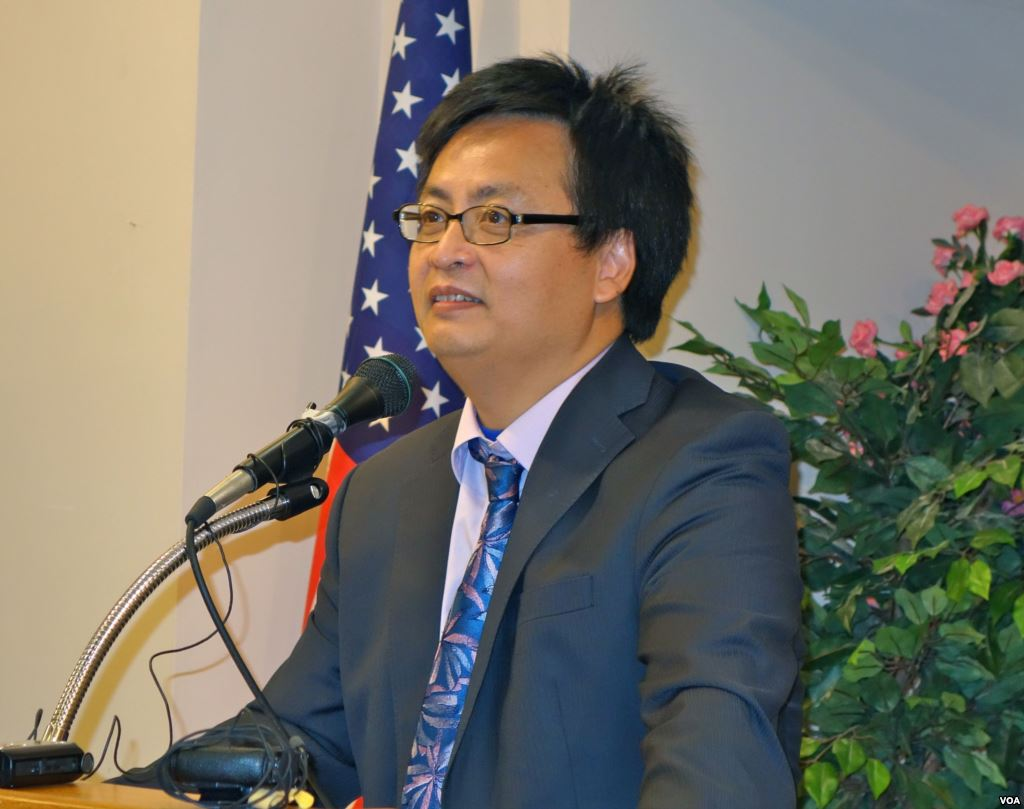
- Born: 5 March 1966 (age 60); Sichuan, China
- Education: Peking University (BA, MA); Sorbonne University (PhD)
- Known for: Tiananmen Square protests of 1989
- Spouse: Chai Ling (m. 1988; div. 1990)

Feng Congde (simplified Chinese: 封从德; traditional Chinese: 封從德; pinyin: Fēng Cóngdé, born 5 March 1966 in Sichuan) is a Chinese dissident and Republic of China Restoration activist. He was a student leader from Peking University during the Tiananmen Square protests of 1989, which placed him onto the Chinese government's 21 Most Wanted list. After Tiananmen Massacre, he spent 10 months hiding in various locations in mainland China with the help of a group of Qigong practitioners, until he was smuggled out to Hong Kong on a shipping vessel.

Feng and Chai Ling, a fellow student leader and his wife at the time, were given special permission by the French government to smuggle into France and flown out in secrecy to Paris accompanied by a French diplomat. He spent 15 years in France, in 2003 he received his Ph.D. degree of Religious Sciences on Taoism and Traditional Chinese Medicine at Sorbonne, Paris, following the Taoist Master and the famous professor Kristofer Schipper at Paris University.

He now resides in San Francisco, and continues to advocate for freedom and democracy in China. Feng strives to provide an uncensored representation of the events of the Tiananmen Square protests through his participation in social media and his website, 64memo.com. Feng is the author of A Tiananmen Journal: Republic on the Square, published in 2009 in Chinese. He is the Executive Director of Tiananmen Academy since 2014.

== Life before and during the 1989 Tiananmen Square Protest ==
Feng was a Peking University graduate student on Artificial Intelligence at Remote Sensing Institute during the 1986-87 pro-democracy student movement in Tiananmen Square, and was briefly arrested for his participation in the event. Right after his release, he discussed his experiences of the protest and the government response with the crowd of students that gathered. This was where he met Chai Ling, and the two developed a relationship that culminated into a marriage in the spring of 1988. He was admitted to Boston University for postgraduate study Ph.D. Program with full scholarship.

On April 18, 1989, many Peking University students had gone to Tiananmen Square to mourn the death of Hu Yaobang. Hu Yaobang was a symbol of reform and justice, and was revered by many students and opponents of the regime. Policemen with nightsticks attacked the demonstrators in front of Xinhua Gate, and the confrontation lead to the early formations of organizations that would lead the 1989 Tiananmen Square protests. Feng had made his way to the forefront of the movement and became a founding member of the Preparatory Committee, which was designated to establish independent student leadership organizations.

Throughout the course of the movement, Feng had been designated Chairman of the Coalition of Independent Student Unions of Beijing, the Vice Commander-in-Chief of the Hunger Strike Group on Tiananmen Square, and then the Vice Commander-in-Chief of the Defend Tiananmen Square Headquarters. Despite being a charismatic student leader, Feng was often disillusioned by the protests and the political struggles of the student leaders, and was not involved in the student leadership at certain points of the movement.

== Life after the 1989 Tiananmen Square Protest ==
Feng and Chai left Beijing soon after the crackdown. Their names listed as the 21 most wanted student leaders, the couple managed to arrive Hong Kong and eventually Paris in April 1990. Due to dissenting view on ways and means to handle the aftermath of the June 4 movement and promote democracy in China, Feng and Chai divorced in late 1990. Feng participated in House hearing on discussion of China's most favoured nation status.

Feng finished the Memo of 1989 Student Protests (八九學運備忘錄), the draft of A Tiananmen Journal: Republic on the Square in early 1991. Raising the idea of setting up a website to provide information related to the 1989 student movement in 2000, Feng established 64memo.com in the following year.

Feng is an activist of the pro-Republic of China camp.

== Response to the documentary The Gate of Heavenly Peace ==
Despite many positive reviews for The Gate of Heavenly Peace in the US media, Feng Congde, with the support of other Tiananmen survivors, participants and supporters, sent an 'open letter' to the directors and producers of the documentary in 2009. He addressed several issues with the documentary, urging the producers to "correct the false reporting and editing" in the film. Feng also criticized the producer, Carma Hinton for her affiliation with Chinese officials (notably Zhou Enlai and Zhang Chunqiao) and participation in the Cultural Revolution.

- "…I want to live…" – Chai Ling in the Philip Cunningham interview

Feng argued that the producers of the documentary had used the language of Chai Ling to manipulate the truth and give a false impression that she ran away prior to the crackdown on June 4, 1989. As the documentary excluded the speech given by Chai Ling on June 8, he claimed that the film producers intentionally omitted it to reinforce the idea that Chai Ling had left the students while knowing that they would be massacred. The detailed account of the event in the June 8 speech would have been proof of her being in the Square until the violent crackdown by the government, and the omission of these accounts during the speech helped misrepresent historical truths.

- "women qidai de jiu shi liuxue" (我们期待的就是流血/ what we are actually hoping for is bloodshed) – Chai Ling in the Philip Cunningham interview

Feng claimed that Carma Hinton had mistranslated "qidai" and taken it out of context to leave viewers with an impression that Chai Ling and other student leaders had provoked and hoped for the bloodshed that occurred during the crackdown. He suggested that "qidai" properly translated as "hope for with anticipation or wait." Feng stated that the occupiers of the Square knew of the possible crackdown, and they wanted it to happen in public so the international community could see the oppressive nature of the Chinese government. He also noted that the producers should have made clear that the student leaders had made a major effort to make sure the students remaining in the Square prior to the crackdown were volunteers who understood the risks of staying. At the last moment on the Tiananmen Square, at about 4:30 am on June 4, 1989, it was Feng himself, after consulting Chai Ling and other student leaders still there, who gave the order to retreat from the Monument which situates at the center of the Square.
