= Wang Dan (dissident) =

Chinese democracy movement leader (born 1969)

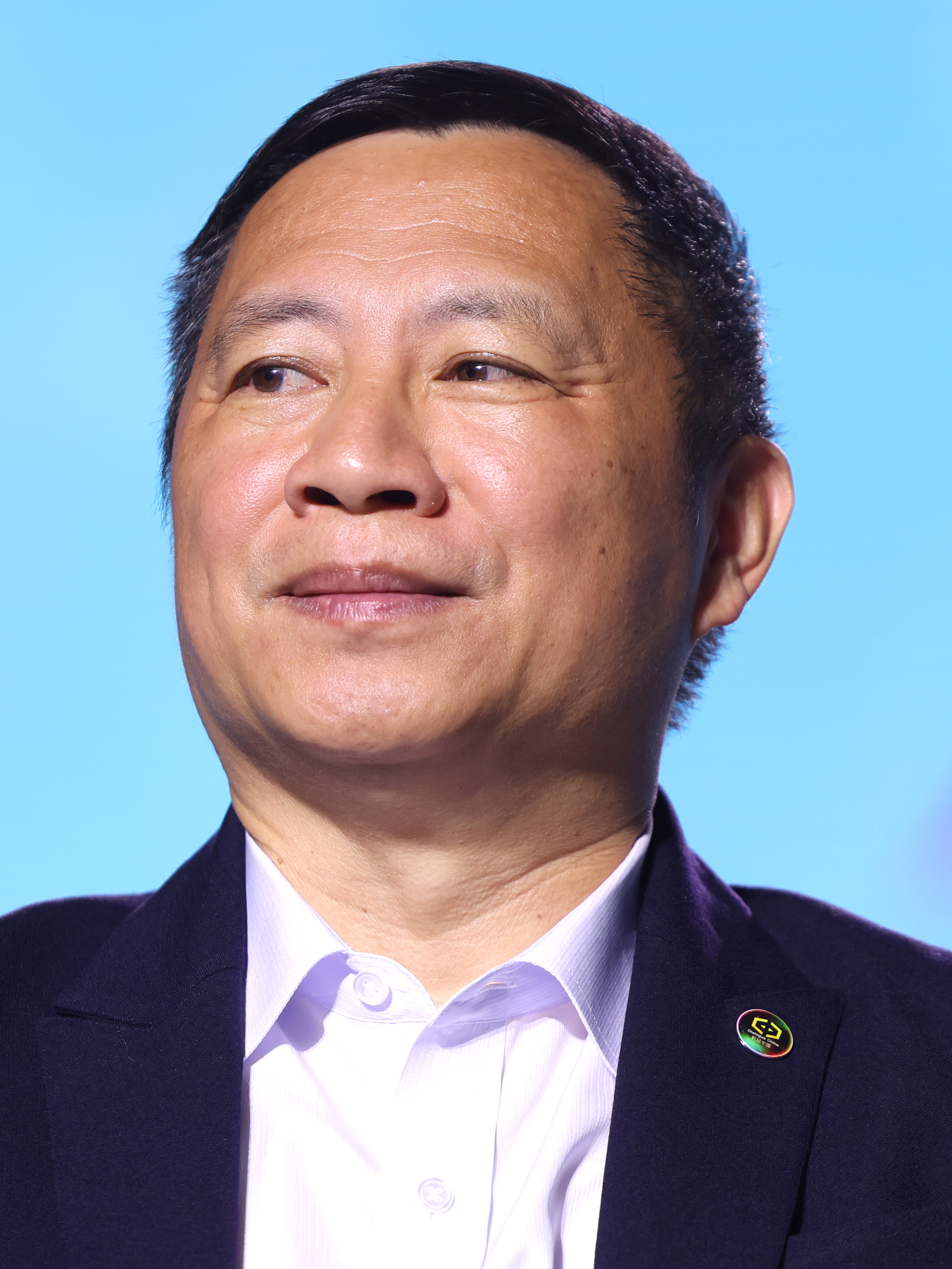
- Wang Dan in 2025
- Born: 26 February 1969 (age 57); Beijing, China
- Education: Peking University (BA); Harvard University (MA, PhD)

Chinese name
- Chinese: 王丹
Transcriptions
Standard Mandarin
- Hanyu Pinyin: Wáng Dān
- IPA: [wǎŋ tán]
Yue: Cantonese
- Yale Romanization: Wòhng Dāan
- Jyutping: wong4 daan1
- IPA: [wɐ̏ŋ táːn]

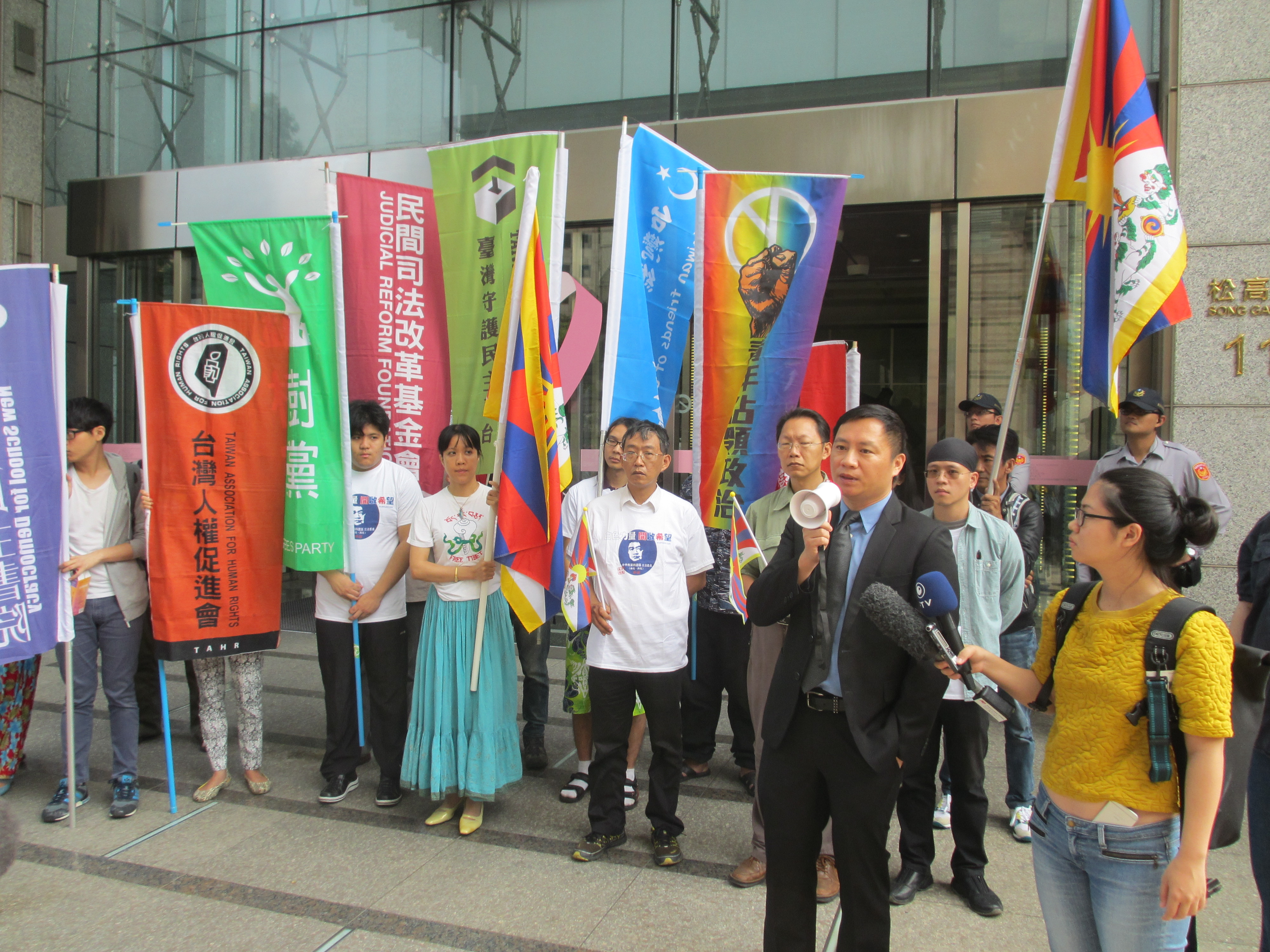
Wang speaking at a demonstration in 2015.

Wang Dan (Chinese: 王丹; born 26 February 1969) is a Chinese political activist and history scholar. He rose to prominence while studying at Peking University as one of the student leaders in the Tiananmen Square protests of 1989, after which he was twice jailed by the Chinese government. He went into exile in the United States in 1998 and, after earning a PhD from Harvard University, divided his time between Taiwan, where he taught at several universities, and the United States.

== Biography ==
Wang was born in 1969. He was a politically active student at the Peking University department of history, organizing "Democracy Salons" at his school. When he participated in the student movement that led to the 1989 protests, he joined the movement's organizing body as the representative from Peking University. As a result, after the Tiananmen Square protests, he immediately became the "most wanted" on the list of 21 fugitives issued. Wang went into hiding but was arrested on 2 July the same year, and sentenced to four years imprisonment in 1991. After being released on parole in 1993, he continued to write publicly (to publications outside of mainland China) and was re-arrested in 1995 for conspiring to overthrow the Chinese Communist Party and was sentenced in 1996 to 11 years. However he was released early and exiled to the United States of America.

Wang resumed his university studies, starting school at Harvard University in 1998 and completing his master's in East Asian history in 2001 and a Ph.D. in 2008. He also performed research on the development of democracy in Taiwan at Oxford University in 2009. He is currently the chairman of the Chinese Constitutional Reform Association.

Wang was interviewed and appeared in the documentary The Beijing Crackdown and the movie Moving the Mountain, about the Tiananmen Square protests. He also featured prominently in Shen Tong's book Almost a Revolution.

He was banned from setting foot on mainland China with his passport expiring in 2003. He attempted to visit Hong Kong in 2004, but was rejected. At that time, he was invited by the Hong Kong Alliance in Support of Patriotic Democratic Movements of China to talk about politics ahead of the 15th anniversary of the June 4 crackdown. Due to a typhoon, Wang finally landed in Hong Kong for the first time in 2012, though he was confined to the airport's restricted zone as he had no Hong Kong visa.

=== Arrest and incarceration ===
Following the People's Liberation Army's crackdown on the protests, Wang was placed on a list of the 21 most wanted student leaders of the protests. Imprisoned on 2 July 1989, Wang spent nearly two years in custody before his trial in 1991. Wang was charged with spreading counterrevolutionary propaganda and incitement. He was sentenced to 4 years in prison; a relatively mild sentence compared to other political prisoners in China at this time. This short sentence was thought to be caused by two things: the government was unsure of what to do with so many students, and felt pressure due to their high-profile nature. While incarcerated, Wang spent two years at Qincheng Prison, known for its high number of political prisoners. Despite the usual cramped conditions, because of his high-profile case, Wang was given his own cell.

Wang was released in 1993, just months before the end of his sentence. Wang himself has noted this was most likely related to China's first bid for the Olympic Games since he and 19 other political prisoners were released only a month before the International Olympic Committee was to visit. Almost immediately after his release in 1993 Wang began to promote democracy in China and contacted exiled political activists in the United States. He was arrested for a second time in May 1995, two months after an interview with the US based anti-communist periodical Beijing Spring. In this interview he states: "We should clear a new path and devote ourselves to building a civil society by focusing our efforts on social movements, not political movements, self-consciously maintaining a distance from political power and political organs." Wang was held in custody for 17 months before receiving the charge of "plotting to overthrow the government", and was sentenced to 11 years in prison.

Instead of serving his entire sentence, he was released in 1998, ostensibly for "medical reasons" and was sent immediately to the US where he was examined in hospital, and quickly released to live in the United States as an exiled political activist. His release and move to the United States followed an agreement between the United States and China whereby the United States removed its support for a resolution criticizing China at the United Nations Commission on Human Rights, and in return China released political prisoners such as Wang.

=== Exile in the United States ===
Not long after Wang arrived in the United States, he began to criticize the Chinese government once again. Wang believes the CCP must change its ways, and in an interview with the US magazine The Weekly Standard he states: "The key to democracy in China is independence. My country needs independent intellectuals, independent economic actors, independent spirits." Wang received his PhD from Harvard University in 2008, and continues to be actively involved in fighting for change in China. Two of his works include: "20 years after Tiananmen" which takes a look at how economic change has affected the Chinese people, and contains suggestions for social and human rights changes. Wang also wrote "Rebuild China with an Olympic Amnesty" after his arrival in the United States; the document has a more positive outlook, as he felt international events such as the Olympic Games could shed light on human rights issues in China. In 2007, Wang's second sentence expired, and he was officially "released". The certificate for his release was issued to his parents on 2 October 2007.

=== Activism and education work ===
Wang has been productive in the years after his release from China. Wang has been able to publish articles such as "Rebuild China with an Olympic Amnesty" and "20 years after Tiananmen" as well as give public interviews. His exile in the United States allowed him to attend Harvard University to finish his education, obtaining a history degree. He also became chairman of the Chinese Constitutional Reform Association.

Wang taught PRC history at National Tsing Hua University in Hsinchu, Taiwan from 2010 to 2015. While he was teaching a class in November 2010, a woman carrying a knife entered the room, intending to stab Wang. He was able to remove the knife from the woman before she was able to stab him. He believes that "this was the first time he faced what looked like an attempt on his life". The woman had allegedly been stalking Wang for three years.

According to a Chinese language article from Radio Free Asia, as of July 2009, Wang has a Facebook page that he hopes to use to communicate with people in mainland China.

Wang is a member of the WikiLeaks advisory board.

Wang sits on the board of trustees for the Committee for Freedom in Hong Kong Foundation (CFHK).

=== Payments from Chen Shui-bian ===
In April 2011, news media reported that Wang testified in court that he had received two grants from the Chen Shui-bian administration totaling US$400,000 and that the source of the money was not clear. Wang responded that the reports of him having received US$400,000 are false.

Later, Wang said, "The report [of the Central News Agency] is misleading. What we accepted is the Republic of China's government's funding of the overseas Democracy Movement. Well, if it is said to be Chen Shui-bian's personal support, then I think this is not in line with the facts. [...] What he represents is not himself, but the government of the Republic of China."

In April 2022, Chen disclosed 21 cases of "Guowu Jiyao Fei", including two payments to Wang, totaling 6.6 million NTD.

Chen disclosed that Wang was paid US$200,000 after meeting him. Wang came to the Presidential Palace to talk to Chen. Chen also allocated US$200,000 to be paid in two years to Wang. However, Chen said that U.S. law stipulates that it is not allowed to accept foreign government funding. In order to help Wang, the government used many people. Wang admitted this in a secret court, although receiving money from a foreign government is illegal in the United States.

=== Donation for brain tumor ===
In 2014, Wang wrote on Facebook that he suspected having a brain tumor and requested the Taiwanese government to let him go to Taiwan. Dissidents Tang Baiqiao and Feng Congde accused him of deceiving the public.

=== Sexual misconduct allegations ===
In 2023, a Taiwanese man named Lee Yuan-chun said in a social media post that Wang had kissed and attempted to rape him in a hotel room in Flushing, New York in 2014, when Lee was 19 years old. He said he persuaded Wang to stop, but that Wang subjected him to lewd remarks in the following days. Lee subsequently filed a criminal complaint towards Wang alleging attempted rape, while Wang said Lee's allegations were unfounded.

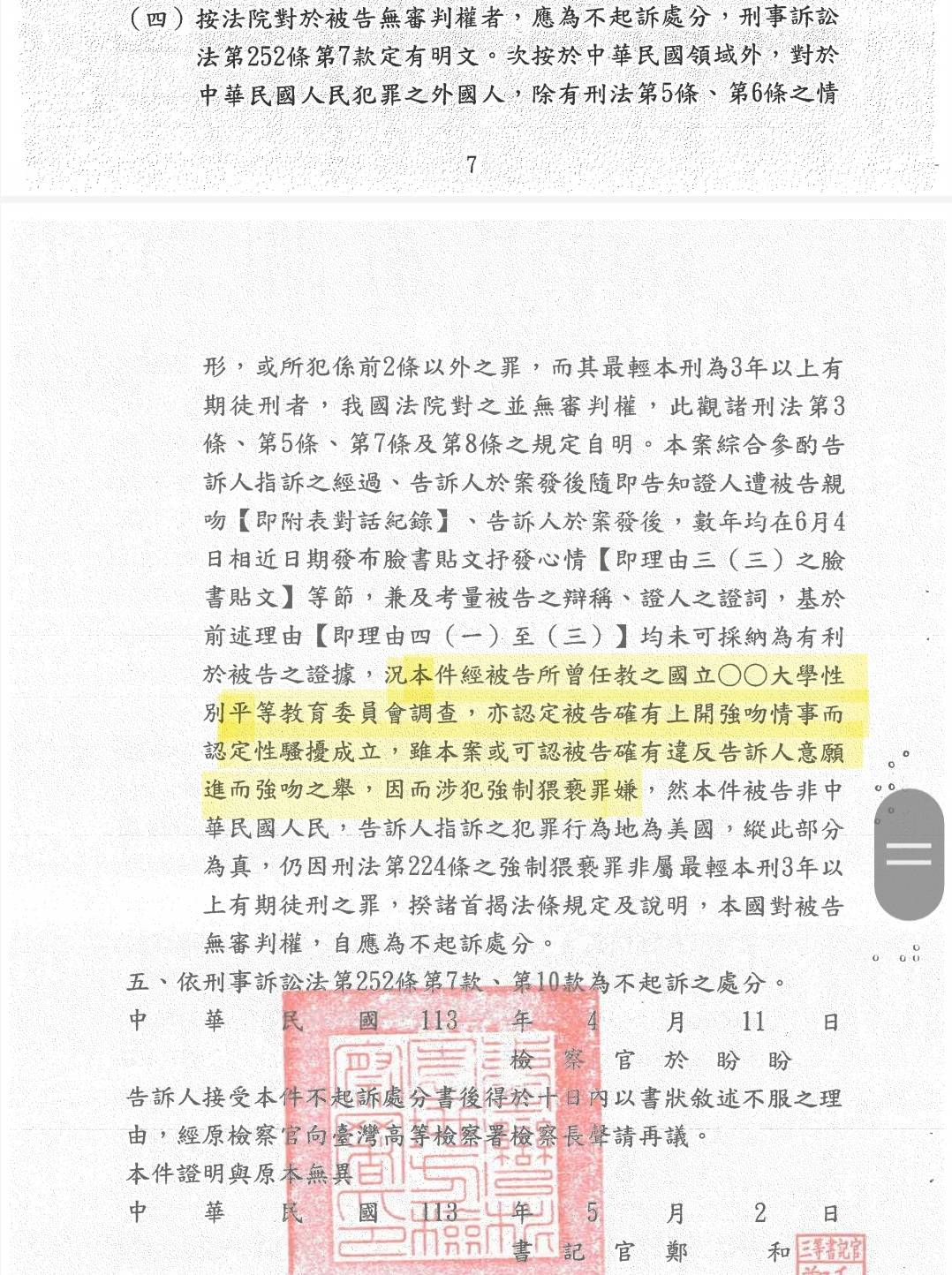
Non-Prosecution Notice shared by Lee Yuan-chun

Nearly a year after the 2024 incident, Lee Yuan-chun received a 'Non-Prosecution Notice' from the Taipei District Prosecutors Office and publicly shared partial screenshots of the notice on Facebook. The notice indicated that, based on Lee's testimony, chat records of his confiding in others, and personal trauma-related posts he had made on Facebook around the anniversary of the 1989 Tiananmen Square protests and massacre each year, the prosecutors concluded that Wang's act of forceful kissing was established and constituted a suspected offense of forcible indecency. However, the prosecutors determined they lacked jurisdiction over non-Republic of China nationals accused of crimes committed abroad and therefore decided not to prosecute. Furthermore, the notice ruled that Wang's testimony and his witnesses' statements could not be admitted as evidence in his favor.

In response, Wang issued a statement upon receiving the notice, claiming that he had received a 'Non-Prosecution Notice' signed by the prosecutor citing 'insufficient evidence' among other reasons.

The National Tsing Hua University where Wang worked until 2017 decided to launch an investigation in response, contacted his students from the past 13 years, and cancelled his lectures in the upcoming semester in the university's school of sociology out of concern for his students. An investigative report by Deutsche Welle published in July 2023 mentioned further accusations against Wang regarding assault and sexual harassment.

On 24 September 2024, Wang's visit to the College of William and Mary sparked controversy when he gave a talk, titled "Understanding Today's China."

On 6 November 2025, Wang issued a statement saying: "The Tsinghua University Gender Equity Committee, regarding the same incident and with the same lack of sufficient evidence, unilaterally conducted an investigation and ruled that 'sexual harassment was established.' This conclusion not only contradicts the judgment of the judicial organs but is also more shocking, and it seriously damages the credibility of the procedure." The statement also mentioned: "I respect the school's system and the value of gender equality, but I firmly believe that the Gender Equity Committee's ruling does not conform to the facts, the evidence is clearly insufficient, and it is a serious misjudgment. I have filed a complaint in accordance with statutory and school procedures and will continue to pursue justice in accordance with the law. If the subsequent review procedures still cannot clarify the facts and restore my innocence, after receiving the paper judgment, I will discuss with my lawyer whether to appeal to defend my personal reputation and basic rights."

=== Zoom blocking ===
An event hosted by Wang on Zoom in the United States was interrupted on 3 June 2020, with his Zoom account being blocked. This led to US lawmakers asking Zoom Video Communications to clarify their relationship with China regarding freedom of speech. Zoom apologized, explaining that the company was puzzled with requests from China regarding blocking, but they would not repeat the practice of blocking outside of China.

== Political positions ==
=== Looking back at Tiananmen ===
Wang felt there were many things that could have been changed about the movement, and he has raised these issues, both during and after the movement. In an interview with The New York Times published 2 June 1989, Wang states, "I think that the student movements in the future should be firmly based on something solid, such as the democratization of campus life or the realization of civil rights according to the Constitution,… Otherwise, the result is chaos." Another issue Wang raises is the involvement of intellectuals in the movement, expressed in the Times interview as well as a 2008 interview titled "Tiananmen Remembered". In this source he believes that intellectuals were not used early enough in the movement, and their involvement may have changed the course of events. Despite pointing out failures, Wang feels the protests affected the mentality of many Chinese people, arguing the hunger strike was necessary as it allowed greater attention on the movement. In addition to this, Wang feels that the crackdown, and the promotion of democracy garnered the attention of the entire nation and educated people on democracy, which was a new idea for many Chinese people.

=== Democracy ===
Wang has stated that "the pursuit of wealth is part of the impetus for democracy". He believed that the Tiananmen Square movement "is not ready for worker participation because democracy must first be absorbed by the students and intellectuals before they can spread it to others".

=== On China's economic development ===
At a press conference in Toronto on 31 May 2009, Wang commented on the so-called "Beijing Doctrine": "For the sake of economic improvement, everything can be done, even killing people ... [such a doctrine shows that] the Tiananmen Massacre is still going on, only in different ways: it was the students' lives being taken physically in 1989, but it is the mind of the world being poisoned spiritually today."

=== United States politics ===
Wang has claimed that the Black Lives Matter movement is a plot by the Chinese Communist Party (CCP) to prevent Donald Trump from winning the 2020 presidential elections and to disrupt US civil society. He has additionally said that the Democratic Party is "weak" on China. After Joe Biden won the 2020 elections, he said he wanted to hold-off recognizing Biden as president-elect and criticized the media for "biased reporting". He also said about Biden:

For Biden's policies toward China, the part about making China play by the international rules, I think, is very hollow. As we know, the Chinese Communist Party hardly abides by international rules. The United States must realize that there will be no improvements on human rights issues in China if there is no regime change.

== See also ==
- List of Chinese dissidents
