= Li Lu =

Chinese American investor and businessman (born 1966)

- 李录
- Born: April 6, 1966 (age 60); Tangshan, Hebei, China
- Education: Nanjing University; Columbia University (BA, JD, MBA)
- Known for: Founder and Chairman of Himalaya Capital
- Awards: World Economic Forum Global Leader for Tomorrow (2011)

Chinese name
- Traditional Chinese: 李錄 or 李祿
- Simplified Chinese: 李录
Transcriptions
Standard Mandarin
- Hanyu Pinyin: Lǐ Lù

Li Lu (Chinese: 李录; born April 6, 1966) is a Chinese-born American value investor, businessman and philanthropist. He is the founder and chairman of Himalaya Capital. Prior to immigrating to France and the United States, he was one of the student leaders of the 1989 Tiananmen Square student protests. In 2021, he also co-founded The Asian American Foundation and serves as its chairman.

== Early life and education ==
Li Lu was born in April 1966, in Tangshan, China. He was a survivor of 1976 Tangshan earthquake, one of the deadliest in recorded history. During Mao Zedong's Cultural Revolution of the 1960's, his parents were sent to labor camps by the government. As a consequence, he transitioned through multiple orphanages and caretakers as he grew up.

In 1985, he went to Nanjing University, where he majored in physics but later transferred to economics. In 1989, he participated in the Tiananmen Square student protests and became one of the student leaders. He helped organize the students and participated in a hunger strike. After the crackdown on the movement, he fled the PRC and went to France, and then New York City at the age of 23, where his grandfather had received his PhD at Columbia University.

In 1990, he published a book about his experience in China titled Moving the Mountain: My Life in China. The book was the basis of a 1994 feature-film documentary, Moving the Mountain, produced by Trudie Styler and directed by Michael Apted, which probed the origins of the 1989 protests in Tiananmen Square and the consequences of the movement in the lives of several of the movement's student leaders. The book recounts a symbolic marriage ceremony on May 22, 1989, between Li Lu and his then girlfriend, Zhao Ming, at the Heroes' Monument. Students gathered at the wedding to congratulate the married couple and sang the "Wedding March," which gradually turned into "The Internationale." Chai Ling quotes Li Lu in her book as saying the marriage was meaningless.

At Columbia, Li first enrolled in the American Language Program to learn English. He then studied in the School of General Studies and later transferred to Columbia College. He ended up joining the college, law school and business school over a six-year period. Li Lu was one of the first in Columbia's history to receive three degrees simultaneously: a B.A. in economics, a M.B.A., and a J.D. in 1996.

== Investment career ==
Li was inspired to get into investment after hearing Warren Buffett, a Columbia alumnus, give a lecture at Columbia in 1993. As detailed in the Foreword to the Chinese Edition of Poor Charlie's Almanack: The Wit and Wisdom of Charles T. Munger, Li Lu found Buffett's lecture on the principles of investing in the stock market "concise, logical and convincing." Shortly thereafter, Li Lu began investing in stocks while a student at Columbia University.

He began his career in investment banking as a corporate finance associate at Donaldson, Lufkin & Jenrette in 1996. In 1997, he founded Himalaya Capital, known for its disciplined and value-oriented approach to investing.

Charlie Munger, vice-chairman of Berkshire Hathaway and a long-time partner of the investor Warren Buffett, was one of the investors of his fund, and a "mentor and good friend" (in Li Lu's own words). Li Lu met Charlie Munger on Thanksgiving 2003 and they had been lifetime friends. Munger has stated that Li Lu is the only outside manager he has ever invested with and has described him as the "Chinese Warren Buffett."

Li Lu's investing mantra is "accurate and complete information," including understanding the character of a CEO by visiting his local church and speaking to his neighbors. He believes the most important thing in investing is intellectual honesty, recognizing that there is always a possibility that "you don't know that you don't know." According to a 2021 interview by Columbia Business School Professor Bruce Greenwald, Li Lu's investment strategy attempts to identify and invest in long-term compounders, focusing on the nature of a business' competition "such that one could predict the outcome in 10 years, even with all the up and downs in the macro environment" which he says is the most important.

Li Lu has been known as the man who introduced the Chinese battery and electric car maker BYD Company to Charlie Munger and Warren Buffett. He is an informal advisor to BYD. His investment partnership owns about 2.5% of BYD.

Li was rumored to be the front runner to manage a large portion of Berkshire Hathaway's investment portfolio once Warren Buffett steps down. A report in The Wall Street Journal quoted Charlie Munger as saying he regards it as "a foregone conclusion" that Li Lu would be one of Berkshire's top investment officials after Warren Buffett retires. This was also hinted several times in some conversations with Buffett. In 2010, it was revealed that Li Lu had withdrawn himself from consideration for the job.

== Philanthropy and other activities ==
In May 2021, Li Lu alongside several Asian-American business leaders, including Jerry Yang, co-founder of Yahoo, and Joseph Tsai, co-founder of Alibaba, launched The Asian American Foundation (TAAF) a nonprofit organization with $125 million in initial commitments from the board. TAAF's mission statement is to serve the 23 million Asian Americans and Pacific Islanders (AAPI) in three key areas: anti-hate programs, education, and data and research. Li Lu serves as a board member of The Asian American Foundation (TAAF). He served as the Inaugural Board Chair for TAAF from 2020 to 2024. Since launch, TAAF has raised over $1 billion to support AAPI communities.

In January 2020, Li Lu co-founded the Guardians of the Angeles Charitable Foundation to combat the global COVID-19 crisis and now serves as Chairman of the Board of the Foundation.

In May 2010, Li Lu helped to translate and publish the Chinese version of Poor Charlie's Almanack, The Wit and Wisdom of Charles T. Munger (ISBN 978-7-208-08994-5) in China and wrote a foreword for the book. In 2020, Li Lu wrote and published a book in China titled Civilization, Modernization, Value Investment and China.

Li Lu served as a trustee of Columbia University from 2017 to 2024 and currently serves as a trustee of California Institute of Technology (Caltech). In 2025, Li Lu donated $15 million to Columbia Law School's new library and it was named The Li Lu Law Library.

== Recognition ==
Li Lu was elected to The American Academy of Arts and Sciences in 2020. He is a past recipient of the John Jay Award from Columbia College, the Raoul Wallenberg Human Rights Award from the Congressional Human Rights Foundation, and the Reebok Human Rights Award. He is featured in the Smithsonian Institute's Family of Voices, a part of the ongoing twenty-year Exhibition, starting in 2017, "Many Voices, One Nation" at the National Museum of American History.

== Published works ==
- 文明、现代化、价值投资与中国 (Civilization, Modernization, Value Investing and China, 2020) (ISBN 9-7-87521-712-59-9)
- Foreword to the Chinese Edition of Poor Charlie's Almanack: The Wit and Wisdom of Charles T. Munger (2010) (ISBN 978-7-208-08994-5)
- Moving the Mountain: My Life in China (ISBN 0-399-13545-6)
