= Yuan Mu =

Chinese politician and journalist (1928–2018)

Yuan Mu (Chinese: 袁木; January 1928 – December 13, 2018) was a Chinese politician and journalist. During his tenure at the State Council, he acted as its spokesperson and headed the State Council Research Office.

== Early life ==
Yuan was born in January 1928, in Xinghua, Jiangsu Province, China. He graduated in 1945 from Nanjing Zhonghua High School and attended National Northwest Junior College of Agriculture and Forestry.

Before joining the Chinese government, Yuan was a journalist for about 20 years. He worked at local newspapers before joining the state-owned Xinhua News Agency.

== Political career ==
As the State Council spokesperson, Yuan was invited by student protestors during the Tiananmen Square protests to a forum on April 29, 1989. The forum was also attended by vice-minister of the State Education Commission He Dongchang. Attended by 45 students from 16 Beijing universities and colleges, the forum lasted three hours. During the forum, Yuan denied that corruption was widespread within the Communist Party or that the press was censored.

Yuan gave the Chinese government's first response to the military crackdown on the Tiananmen Square protests. Two days after the crackdown on June 4, 1989, Yuan described the protests as a "counterrevolutionary rebellion" incited by "thugs and hooligans". He said fewer than 300 people had died, of which only 23 were students. He also implied that at least half of those deaths were soldiers of the People's Liberation Army.

In an interview with American journalist Tom Brokaw on June 17, Yuan clarified that while he did not claim that no casualties resulted from putting down the "counter-revolutionary rebellion", nobody had died in Tiananmen Square when the People's Liberation Army cleared the square. He said that student protestors had vacated Tiananmen Square after being requested to leave by the army before the dawn of June 4. According to Yuan, American television networks altered news footage to make it appear that murder took place.

After the military crackdown, Yuan became a member of the 8th Chinese People's Political Consultative Conference Standing Committee. He retired in 2000.

== Death ==
Yuan died in Beijing on December 13, 2018, from illness.
