= Memorial to the Chinese from Tiananmen =

Polish monument dedicated to Tiananmen Square protests and massacre

- Pomnik ku czci Chińczyków z Tian’anmen
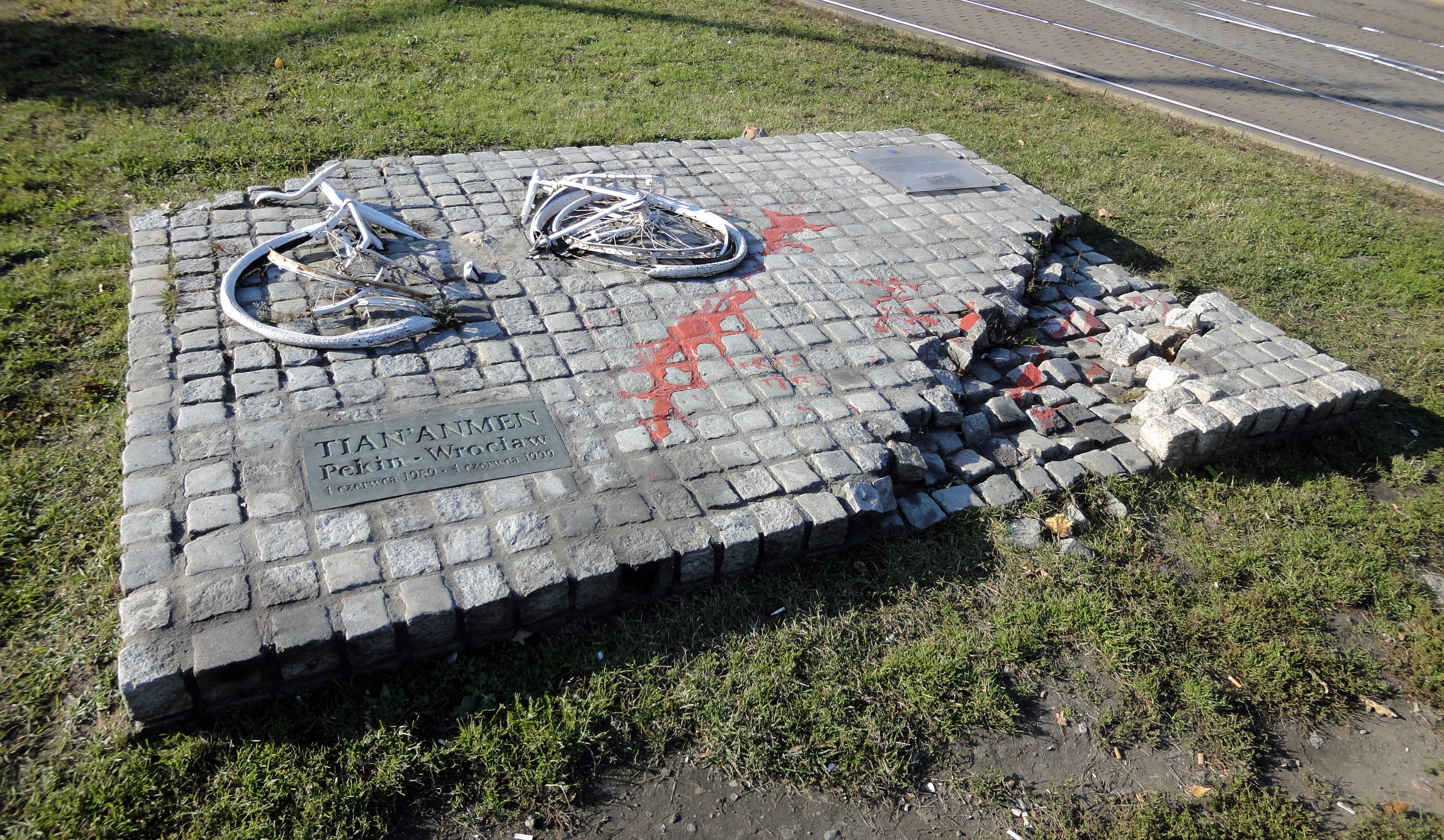
- Interactive map of Memorial to the Chinese from Tiananmen
- Location: Oławska Street, Wrocław, Poland
- Coordinates: 51°06′28″N 17°02′20″E
- Designer: Igor Wójcik, Robert Jezierski, Joanna Czarnecka (original monument); Marek Stanielewicz (reconstruction)
- Completion date: 1989 (original); 1999 (reconstruction)

The Memorial to the Chinese from Tiananmen, (Note: Polish: Pomnik ku czci Chińczyków z Tian’anmen) also known as the Memorial to the Victims of the Suppression of the Tiananmen Square, (Note: Polish: Pomnik ofiar pacyfikacji na placu Tiananmen) is a monument in Wrocław, Poland, placed on Oławska Street. It commemorates the 1989 Tiananmen Square protests in Beijing and the victims of the subsequent massacre in which People's Liberation Army troops armed with assault rifles and accompanied by tanks, fired at the demonstrators and those trying to block the military's advance into Tiananmen Square. The monument was first created by Igor Wójcik, Robert Jezierski and Joanna Czarnecka in 1989 and was later recreated by Marek Stanielewicz, after the original was destroyed by the Security Service.

== History ==
The monument was created by Igor Wójcik, Robert Jezierski, Joanna Czarnecka in 1989 during a demonstration by dissident group in Wrocław, which followed the events of Tiananmen Square massacre of 4 June 1989. It was revealed at the end of the demonstration and destroyed the following day by Security Service. It was recreated ten years later in 1999 by Marek Stanielewicz.

== Description ==
The monument is a paved square plate on which lies a destroyed bicycle. Part of it has a form of a depressed strip, stylized to look like it was destroyed by being run over by a tank's continuous track. The monument is placed on a small lawn next to Oławska Street. It is administrated by the Road Management and Maintenance of the City of Wrocław.
