= Student propaganda during the 1989 Tiananmen Square protests and massacre =

During the 1989 Tiananmen Square protests and massacre student demonstrators created and distributed a large variety of propaganda. The first of these were memorial posters dedicated to Hu Yaobang, which were placed in Peking University following his death on Saturday April 15, 1989. On April 16 and 17, pamphlets, leaflets and other forms of propaganda began to be distributed by university students both in Peking University and at Tiananmen Square where large congregations of students began to form in what became the beginning stages of the protest. These were used to communicate among the students as well as to spread their messages and demands to groups such as the Chinese government and foreign media. Other forms of propaganda would emerge as the protests continued, such as a hunger strike beginning on May 13 and visits from celebrities and intellectuals, as well as speeches and songs. All of these were used to promote the interests of the student protest movement.

== Propaganda organization ==
The Beijing Students' Autonomous Federation was the largest student union which participated in the protests, however its leadership was often divided and it did not have centralized control of the movement. With no single organization responsible for the creation of propaganda smaller groups of students took the initiative to create and distribute posters, leaflets, and slogans. The student propaganda "hinged not simply upon a few leaders and interim movement groups but on the conscientious commitment of tens of thousands of students and their persuasive articulation of shared grievances to the masses." This occasionally led to confusion about what the general aim of the movement and propaganda would be, especially in the first several weeks following Hu Yaobang's death.

== Types of propaganda ==
=== Big-character posters, leaflets, and banners ===
The propaganda created by the students generally followed "themes including the causes and origins of the movement, the implications of democracy, human rights, and constitutional reform." Big-character posters (dazibao) were the preferred method used to communicate these messages. These were large, handwritten posters that allowed the students to prominently display messages and instructions to other students. Their large size allowed anything from slogans to large articles or lists of demands to be written on them and they could be easily created with minimal cost. Notable short essays that were displayed on big-character posters were the "Statement of the May 13th Hunger Strikers" and "An Open Letter to our Brothers, the Soldiers." These big-character posters were posted at both Tiananmen Square as well as at universities such as Peking University, which had a central billboard covered area known as "the triangle." Student propaganda displayed in this manner could effectively bypass the state-controlled media and communicate the message of the students directly to Beijing's population and journalists who were present. Students also distributed pamphlets and leaflets beside the larger posters. Often these contained shorter or abridged versions of the longer texts on the posters. Student unions would write by hand the pamphlets onto stencils and then transferred onto newsprint through a mimeograph. Other types of physical propaganda included flags, bandannas, and pieces of paper tied to the clothes of the demonstrators. Poems were also posted around Tiananmen Square which reflected the students' demands and attempted to bolster morale:

"May the frivolous ship of martial law

Slide over my youthful shoulders as over fine sand

Tomorrow morning you will see a brand new sun

Tomorrow your fighting spirit will be greater"

– Anonymous

=== Other forms of propaganda ===
Hunger Strikes began on May 13 with the intention of forcing the government into dialogue. These generated widespread sympathy and were and drew attention, both domestic and international, to the movement. Several aspects of the hunger strikes functioned as student propaganda. Chai Ling and other student leaders made statements and posted demands throughout the hunger strike, and posters such as the "Statement of the May 13th Hunger Strikers" were created in order to build sympathy for the movement. Notable public figures and intellectuals who joined the protesters in Tiananmen Square and lent them their support were also used to draw attention. Well known Taiwanese pop star Hou Dejian and scholars such as Chen Ziming, Liu Xiaobo, and Gao Xin were among those who were present. Televised dialogues, though ultimately unsuccessful at advancing student demands, were another way of communicating with the people of China. In Tiananmen Square, a student broadcast center allowed the student leaders to broadcast a continual stream of speeches and demands that continued throughout the protests.

== Student propaganda and the media ==
Public news sources such as newspapers, editorials, and journalists were vital for the success for the movement. These forms of mass communication allowed the students to gain attention, both domestic and foreign, which would draw attention to their demands and raise funds to support the movement. Domestic news outlets such as the People's Daily acted as important sources of information for the Chinese people, and a positive portrayal of the students was important to the public image of the movement. The hunger strikes gained the students international attention, and the striking image of "the country's youth sacrificing themselves for its future shook many who until then had not been involved." The presence of celebrities such as Hou Dejian also gained the recognition of foreign media. Western and Chinese journalist were active participants in the movement, and were present throughout its duration. Student leader Shen Tong stated on June 24, 1989, that "without their (the media's) involvement, the movement could not have reached such a magnitude and spread throughout the country."
