= 1989 Tiananmen Square protests and massacre =

Student-led demonstrations in China

- Part of the Cold War, the Revolutions of 1989 and the Chinese democracy movement
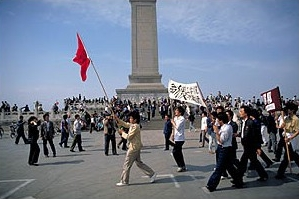
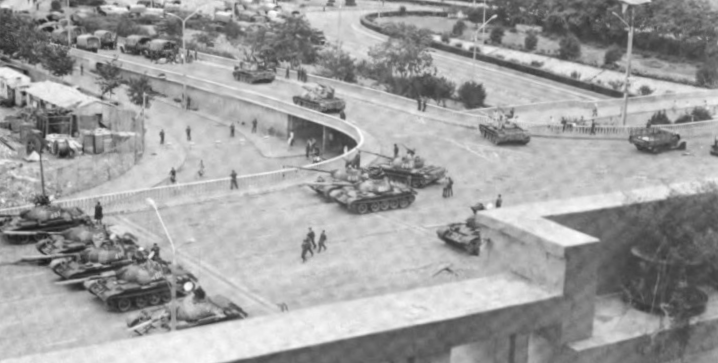
- Protesters in Tiananmen Square on 2 June (top), and tanks in Beijing in July (bottom)
- Date: Initial protests: 15 April – 4 June 1989 (1 month, 2 weeks and 6 days) Massacre: 3–4 June 1989 (1 day); 37 years ago (UTC+9, China daylight saving time)
- Location: Tiananmen Square, Beijing, China and 400 cities nationwide 39°54′12″N 116°23′30″E
- Caused by: Death of Hu Yaobang; Reform and opening up; Inflation; Political corruption; Nepotism in the Communist Party; Third wave of democracy
- Goals: Ending corruption in the Communist Party, democratic reforms, freedom of the press, freedom of speech, freedom of association, social equality, economic reforms, preservation of welfare
- Methods: Hunger strike, sit-in, civil disobedience, protest marches, occupation, rioting
- Result: Government crackdown: Martial law implemented on 20 May; Protests suppressed by force between 3 June and 4 June; Heavy casualties from urban clashes between rioters and Chinese soldiers in Beijing, especially in the Muxidi suburbs; Protest leaders and pro-democracy activists exiled or imprisoned; Rioters charged with violent crimes executed in the following months; Zhao Ziyang removed as General Secretary and from the Politburo; Jiang Zemin promoted to paramount leader by Deng Xiaoping; Imposition of Western sanctions and arms embargoes; Initiation of Operation Yellowbird

Casualties
- Deaths: Official CCP tally: 241 dead (Note: Including 23 soldiers and policemen); Identified by Tiananmen Mothers: 202 dead (Note: Including 4 who committed suicide following the events but not including any soldiers or police); Hospital records: 478 dead Amnesty International: Up to 1,000 dead

Protests led by students and workers, known in China as the June Fourth Incident, (Note: Chinese: 六四事件; pinyin: liùsì shìjiàn) were held in Tiananmen Square in Beijing, China, from 15 April to 4 June 1989. After weeks of unsuccessful attempts between the demonstrators and the Chinese government to find a peaceful resolution, the Chinese government initiated martial law in late May and deployed troops to occupy the square on the night of 3 June in what is referred to as the Tiananmen Square massacre. The events are sometimes called the '89 Democracy Movement, (Note: Chinese: 八九民运; pinyin: Bājiǔ mínyùn) the Tiananmen Square Incident, (Note: Chinese: 天安门事件; pinyin: Tiān'ānmén shìjiàn) or the Tiananmen uprising. The Chinese government terms the events the political turmoil between the spring and summer of 1989. (Note: Chinese: 1989年春夏之交的政治风波; pinyin: 1989 Nián Chūnxià Zhījiāo de Zhèngzhì Fēngbō)

The protests were initiated by the death of former pro-reform Chinese Communist Party (CCP) general secretary Hu Yaobang in April 1989, amid the backdrop of rapid economic development and social change in post-Mao China. The movement's goals reflected anxieties among the people and political elite about the nation's future. Common grievances at the time included inflation, corruption, dismantling of the "iron rice bowl", limited preparedness of graduates for the new economy, and restrictions on political participation. Although the protests were highly disorganised with varying goals, student protestors called for reforms including the rollback of the removal of iron rice bowl jobs, greater political accountability, constitutional due process, democracy, freedom of the press, and freedom of speech. Workers' protests were generally focused on economic issues, specifically inflation and Deng's economic reforms, which weakened Mao-era guarantees such as lifetime employment in state-owned enterprises and associated workplace benefits. These groups united around anti-corruption demands, adjusting economic policies, and protecting social security. At the height of the protests on 17 May, about one million people were assembled in the square.

As the protests developed, Chinese authorities responded with both conciliatory and hardline tactics, exposing deep divisions within the party leadership. By May, a student-led hunger strike galvanised support around the country for the demonstrators, and the protests spread to some 400 cities.

On 20 May, the State Council declared martial law, and as many as 300,000 troops were mobilized to Beijing, but were halted by mass nonviolent resistance from the protestors and Beijing's civilian population. After several weeks of standoffs and confrontations between the army and demonstrators, a 1 June meeting among the CCP's leadership decided to clear the square. Chinese troops advanced into central parts of Beijing through the city's major highways in the early morning hours of 4 June, and engaged in bloody clashes with demonstrators attempting to block them, in which many people – demonstrators, bystanders, and soldiers – were killed or injured. The vast majority of killings were clustered in Beijing's western suburbs along Chang'an Avenue. Estimates of the death toll vary from several hundreds to the low thousands, with thousands more wounded. On 5 June, after military forces cleared the Square, an unidentified individual, later referred to as "Tank Man" briefly stood in front of a column of tanks, temporarily blocking their movement. The photograph of the event became widely circulated internationally and is often regarded as one of the most recognizable images of the 20th century. It is subject to censorship in China.

The event had both immediate and longer-term consequences. Western countries imposed arm embargoes on China and various Western media outlets labeled the crackdown a massacre. In the aftermath of the protests, the Chinese government suppressed other protests around China, carried out mass arrests of protesters which catalysed Operation Yellowbird, strictly controlled coverage of the events in the domestic and foreign affiliated press, and demoted or purged officials it deemed sympathetic to the protests. The government also invested heavily into creating more effective police riot control units. More broadly, the suppression was followed by a halt to political reforms which began in 1986 as well as the New Enlightenment movement, and a slowdown in liberalising policies of the 1980s, which were later partly resumed after Deng Xiaoping's southern tour in 1992. In the longer term, political liberalisation was curtailed, while market-oriented economic reforms continued and were accelerated after 1992 under strong state direction led by Deng Xiaoping.

Considered a watershed event, reactions to the protests set limits on political expression in China that have lasted up to the present day. The events remain one of the most sensitive and most widely censored topics in China.

== Naming ==
1989 Tiananmen Square protests and massacre
- Chinese: 六四事件
- Literal meaning: June Fourth Incident
Transcriptions
Standard Mandarin
- Hanyu Pinyin: Liù-Sì Shìjiàn
- Bopomofo: ㄌㄧㄡˋ ㄙˋ ㄕˋ ㄐㄧㄢˋ
- Wade–Giles: Liu^{4}-Szu^{4} Shih^{4}-chien^{4}
- Tongyong Pinyin: Liòu-Sìh Shìh-jiàn
- Yale Romanization: Lyòu-Sz̀ Shr̀jyàn
- IPA: [ljôʊsɹ̩̂ ʂɻ̩̂tɕjɛ̂n]
Wu
- Romanization: Loh-sy Zy-ji
Yue: Cantonese
- Yale Romanization: Lùhk-sei Sih gihn
- Jyutping: luk6 sei3 si6 gin6
- IPA: [lʊk̚˩.sej˧ si˨ kin˨]
Southern Min
- Hokkien POJ: La̍k-sù Sū-kiaⁿ

Name used by the PRC Government
- Simplified Chinese: 1989年春夏之交的政治风波
- Traditional Chinese: 1989年春夏之交的政治風波
- Literal meaning: Political turmoil between the Spring and Summer of 1989
Transcriptions
Standard Mandarin
- Hanyu Pinyin: 1989-nián chūn xià zhījiāo de zhèngzhì fēngbō
- Wade–Giles: 1989–nien^{2} chʻun^{1} hsia^{4} chih^{1}-chiao^{1} te^{0} cheng^{4}-chih^{4} feng^{1}-po^{1}
- IPA: [í.tɕjòʊ.pá.tɕjòʊ.njɛ̌n ʈʂʰwə́n ɕjâ ʈʂɻ̩́.tɕjáʊ tɤ ʈʂə̂ŋ]
Wu
- Romanization: 1989-ni tshen-ghô tsy-jiau di tsen-tsy fhon-bo
Yue: Cantonese
- Yale Romanization: 1989-nìhn cheūnhaah jígáau dī jingchìh fūngbō
- Jyutping: jat1 gau2 baat3 gau2 nin4 ceon1 haa6 zi1 gaau1 dik1 zing3 zi6 fung1 bo1
Southern Min
- Hokkien POJ: 1989-nî chhun-hē chi-kau tī chèng-tī hong-pho

Second alternative Chinese name
- Simplified Chinese: 八九民运
- Traditional Chinese: 八九民運
- Literal meaning: Eighty-Nine Democracy Movement
Transcriptions
Standard Mandarin
- Hanyu Pinyin: Bā-Jiǔ Mínyùn
- Bopomofo: ㄅㄚ ㄐㄧㄡˇ ㄇㄧㄣˊ ㄩㄣˋ
- Wade–Giles: Pa^{1}-Chiu^{3} Min^{2}-yün^{4}
- Tongyong Pinyin: Ba-Jiǒu Mín-yùn
- Yale Romanization: Bā-Jyǒu Mínyùn
- IPA: [pá.tɕjòʊ mǐn.ŷn]
Wu
- Romanization: poh-cieu Min-yiuin
Yue: Cantonese
- Yale Romanization: baatgáu màhnwahn
- Jyutping: baat3 gau2 man4 wan6
- IPA: [pat̚˧ kɐw˧˥ mɐn˩ wɐn˨]
Southern Min
- Hokkien POJ: pat-káu bîn-ūn

The Chinese government has used numerous names for the event since 1989. As the events unfolded, it was labelled a "counter revolutionary rebellion", which was later changed to simply "riot", followed by "political turmoil" and "1989 storm". Currently, the CCP and the PRC term the events the "political turmoil between the spring and summer of 1989" (1989年春夏之交的政治风波; 1989 Nián Chūnxià Zhījiāo de Zhèngzhì Fēngbō).

In China, the crackdown is known as the "June Fourth Incident" (六四事件; liùsì shìjiàn). Outside mainland China, and among circles critical of the crackdown within mainland China, the crackdown is commonly referred to in Chinese as "June Fourth Massacre" (六四屠殺; liùsì túshā) and "June Fourth Crackdown" (六四鎮壓; liùsì zhènyā). To bypass censorship by the Great Firewall, alternative names have sprung up to describe the events on the Internet, such as May 35th, VIIV (Roman numerals for 6 and 4), Eight Squared (since 8^{2}=64) and 8964 (in yymd format).

In English, the terms "Tiananmen Square Massacre", "Tiananmen Square Protests", and "Tiananmen Square Crackdown" are often used to describe the series of events. However, much of the violence in Beijing did not actually happen in Tiananmen, but outside the square along a stretch of Chang'an Avenue only a few miles long, and especially near the Muxidi area. The term also gives a misleading impression that demonstrations only happened in Beijing, when in fact, they occurred in many cities throughout China.

== Background ==
=== Boluan Fanzheng and economic reforms ===
The Cultural Revolution ended with chairman Mao Zedong's death in 1976 and the arrest of the Gang of Four. The movement, spearheaded by Mao, had caused severe damage to the country's initially diverse economic and social fabric. As a result, the country was now mired in poverty as economic production slowed or came to a halt.

Deng Xiaoping proposed the idea of Boluan Fanzheng ("bringing order out of chaos") to correct the mistakes of the Cultural Revolution. He launched a comprehensive program to reform the Chinese economy called the reform and opening up. Within several years, the country's focus on ideological purity was replaced by a concerted attempt to achieve material prosperity. To oversee his reform agenda, Deng promoted his allies to top government and party posts. Zhao Ziyang was named Premier, the head of government, in September 1980, and Hu Yaobang became CCP General Secretary in 1982. Deng had believed that the "iron rice bowl" was too costly to maintain on the path to modernization and his reforms dismantled Mao-era guarantees such as lifetime employment in state-owned enterprises and associated workplace benefits, contributing to worker unrest and protests over layoffs and inflation.

=== Challenges to Reforms and Opening up ===
Deng's reforms aimed to decrease the state's role in the economy and gradually allow private production in agriculture and industry. By 1981, roughly 73% of rural farms had been de-collectivized, and 80% of state-owned enterprises were permitted to retain their profits.

While the reforms were generally well received by the public, concerns grew over a series of social problems which the changes brought about, including corruption and nepotism on the part of elite party bureaucrats. The state-mandated pricing system, in place since the 1950s, had long kept prices fixed at low levels. The initial reforms created a dual-track price system where some prices were fixed while others were allowed to fluctuate. In a market with chronic shortages, price fluctuation allowed people with powerful connections to buy goods at low prices and sell at market prices. Party bureaucrats in charge of economic management had enormous incentives to engage in such arbitrage. Discontent over corruption reached a fever pitch with the public; and many, particularly intellectuals, began to believe that only democratic reform and the rule of law could cure the country's ills.

Following the 1988 meeting at their summer retreat of Beidaihe, the party leadership under Deng agreed to implement a transition to a market-based pricing system from the previous dual-track price system. News of the relaxation of price controls triggered waves of cash withdrawals, panic buying, and hoarding all over China. The government panicked and rescinded the price reforms in less than two weeks, but there was a pronounced impact for much longer. Inflation soared; official indices reported that the Consumer Price Index increased by 30% in Beijing between 1987 and 1988, leading to panic among salaried workers that they could no longer afford staple goods. Moreover, in the new market economy, unprofitable state-owned enterprises were pressured to cut costs. This threatened a vast proportion of the population that relied on the "iron rice bowl", and instilled fear of potential layoffs coined in Chinese as "xiagang" (下岗), which would imply the loss of social benefits such as job security, medical care, and subsidised housing.

=== Social disenfranchisement and legitimacy crisis ===
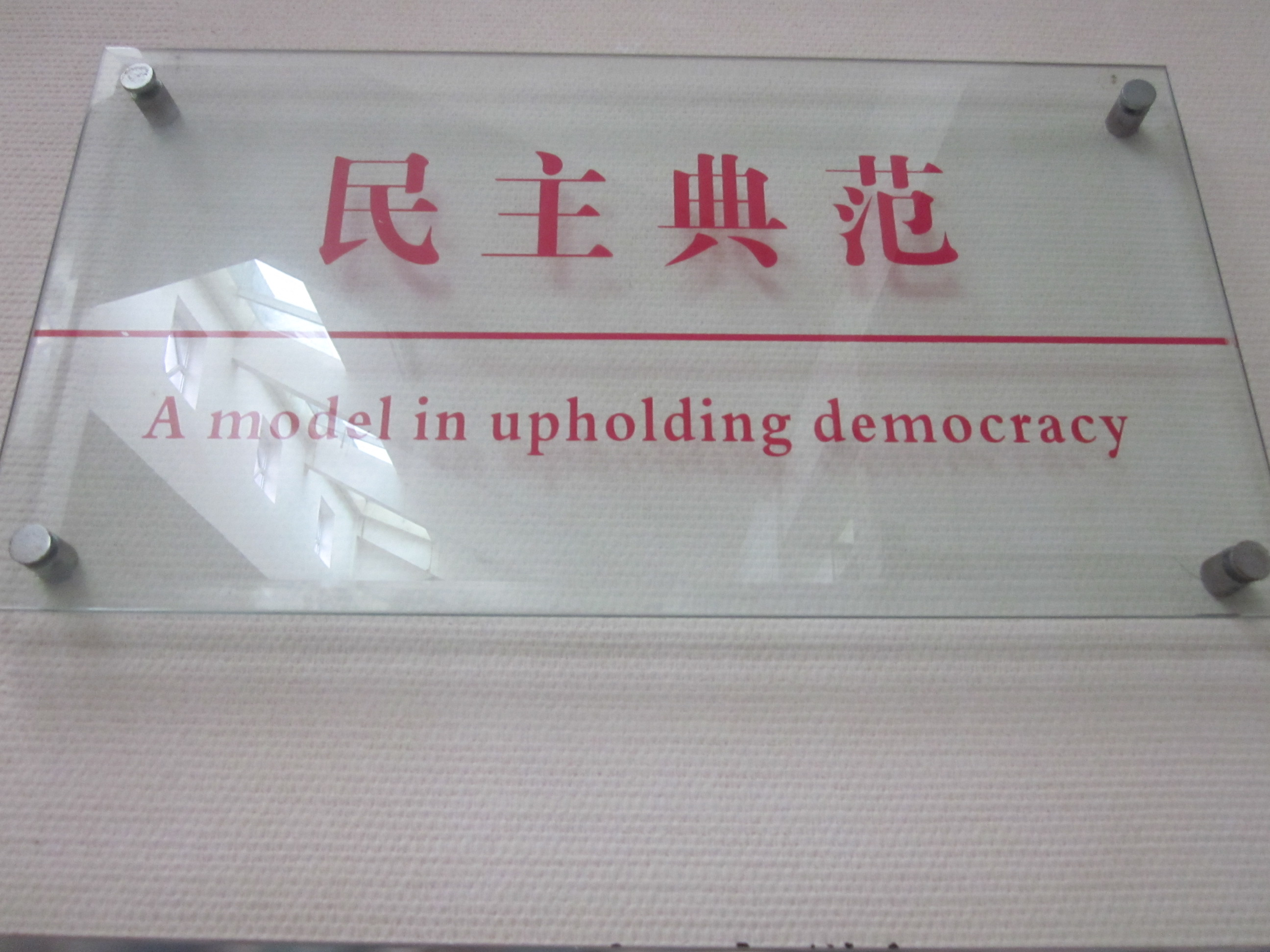
A slogan inside the Former Residence of Hu Yaobang, a leading reformist whose death triggered the Tiananmen Square protests in 1989

In 1978, reformist leaders had envisioned that intellectuals would play a leading role in guiding the country through reforms, but this did not happen as planned. On one hand, the massive New Enlightenment movement led by intellectuals promoted a variety of liberal philosophies and values that challenged the socialist ideology, ranging from democracy, humanism, universal values such as freedom and human rights, to Total Westernisation; in response, since the beginning of the reforms, Deng Xiaoping in 1979 proposed the Four Cardinal Principles to limit the political liberalisation. On the other hand, despite the opening of new universities and increased enrollment, the state-directed education system did not produce enough graduates to meet increased demand in the areas of agriculture, light industry, services, and foreign investment. The job market was especially limited for students specializing in social sciences and the humanities. Moreover, private companies no longer needed to accept students assigned to them by the state, and many high-paying jobs were offered based on nepotism and favouritism. Gaining a good state-assigned placement meant navigating a highly inefficient bureaucracy that gave power to officials who had little expertise in areas under their jurisdiction. Facing a dismal job market and limited chances of going abroad, intellectuals and students had a greater vested interest in political issues. Small study groups, such as the "Democracy Salon" (Chinese: 民主沙龙; pinyin: Mínzhǔ Shālóng) and the "Lawn Salon" (草地沙龙; Cǎodì Shālóng), began appearing on Beijing university campuses. These organisations motivated the students to get involved politically.

Simultaneously, the party's nominally socialist ideology faced a legitimacy crisis as it gradually adopted capitalist practices. Private enterprise gave rise to profiteers who took advantage of lax regulations and who often flaunted their wealth in front of those who were less well off. Popular discontent was brewing over unfair wealth distribution. Greed, not skill, appeared to be the most crucial factor in success. There was widespread public disillusionment concerning the country's future. People wanted change, yet the power to define "the correct path" continued to rest solely in the unelected government's hands.

The comprehensive and wide-ranging reforms created political differences over the pace of marketisation and the control over the ideology that came with it, opening a deep chasm within the central leadership. The reformers ("the right", led by Hu Yaobang) favoured political liberalisation and a plurality of ideas as a channel to voice popular discontent and pressed for further reforms. The conservatives ("the left", led by Chen Yun) said that the reforms had gone too far and advocated a return to greater state control to ensure social stability and to better align with the party's socialist ideology. Both sides needed the backing of paramount leader Deng Xiaoping to carry out important policy decisions.

=== 1986 student demonstrations ===
In mid-1986, astrophysics professor Fang Lizhi returned from a position at Princeton University and began a personal tour of universities in China, speaking about liberty, human rights, and the separation of powers. Fang was part of a wide undercurrent within the elite intellectual community that thought China's poverty and underdevelopment, and the disaster of the Cultural Revolution, were a direct result of China's authoritarian political system and rigid command economy. The view that political reform was the only answer to China's ongoing problems gained widespread appeal among students, as Fang's recorded speeches became widely circulated throughout the country. In response, Deng Xiaoping warned that Fang was blindly worshipping Western lifestyles, capitalism, and multi-party systems while undermining China's socialist ideology, traditional values, and the party's leadership.

In December 1986, inspired by Fang and other "people-power" movements worldwide, student demonstrators staged protests against the slow pace of reform. The issues were wide-ranging and included demands for economic liberalisation, democracy, and the rule of law. While the protests were initially contained in Hefei, where Fang lived, they quickly spread to Shanghai, Beijing, and other major cities. Throughout the demonstrations, broadcasts by the Voice of America news outlet became a key source of information for student protesters.

General Secretary Hu Yaobang was blamed for showing a "soft" attitude and mishandling the protests, thus undermining social stability. He was denounced thoroughly by conservatives and was forced to resign as general secretary on 16 January 1987. The party began the "Anti-bourgeois liberalisation campaign", aiming at Hu, political liberalisation, and Western-inspired ideas in general. The campaign stopped student protests and restricted political activity, but Hu remained popular among intellectuals, students, and Communist Party progressives.

=== Political reforms ===
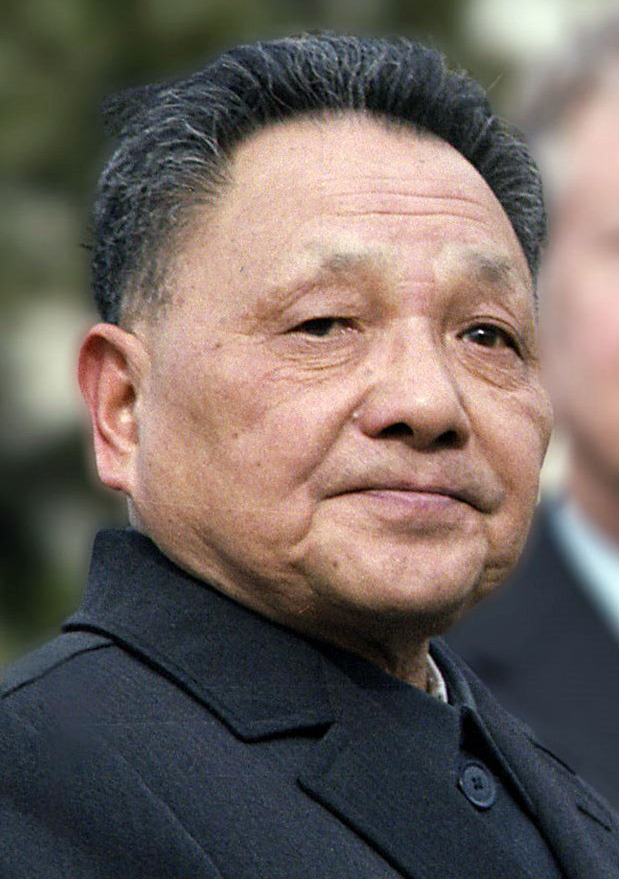
Deng Xiaoping (1904–1997) was the Paramount Leader of China.

On 18 August 1980, Deng Xiaoping gave a speech titled "On the Reform of the Party and State Leadership System" ("党和国家领导制度改革") at a full meeting of the CCP Politburo in Beijing, launching political reforms in China. He called for a systematic revision of China's constitution, criticizing bureaucracy, centralistion of power, and patriarchy, while proposing term limits for the leading positions in China and advocating democratic centralism and collective leadership. In December 1982, the fourth and current Constitution of China, known as the 1982 Constitution, was passed by the 5th National People's Congress.

In the first half of 1986, Deng repeatedly called for the revival of political reforms, as further economic reforms were hindered by the original political system with an increasing trend of corruption and economic inequality. A five-man committee to study the feasibility of political reform was established in September 1986; the members included Zhao Ziyang, Hu Qili, Tian Jiyun, Bo Yibo and Peng Chong. Deng's intention was to boost administrative efficiency, further separate responsibilities of the Party and the government, and eliminate bureaucracy. Although he spoke in terms of the rule of law and democracy, Deng delimited the reforms within the one-party system and opposed the implementation of Western-style constitutionalism.

In October 1987, at the 13th National Congress of the CCP, Zhao Ziyang gave a report drafted by Bao Tong on the political reforms. In his speech titled "Advance Along the Road of Socialism with Chinese characteristics" ("沿着有中国特色的社会主义道路前进"), Zhao argued that socialism in China was still in its primary stage and, taking Deng's speech in 1980 as a guideline, detailed steps to be taken for political reform, including promoting the rule of law and the separation of powers, imposing de-centralisation, and improving the election system. At this Congress, Zhao was elected to be the CCP General Secretary.

== Funding and support ==
During the demonstrations, protesters received a significant amount of support from domestic and outside sources. The Chinese University in Hong Kong donated HK$10,000 by early May, and groups such as the Hong Kong Alliance in Support of Patriotic Democratic Movements of China were founded in support of the protests. Funding also came from the United States, Canada, Japan, Taiwan, Australia, and countries across Europe. The Chinese Alliance for Democracy (CAD), a New York–based overseas Chinese NGO, provided financial support for the protests and organized rallies in both New York and Washington, D.C. In April, Liu Xiaobo and Hu Ping, one of CAD's leaders, jointly published an "Open Letter to Chinese University Students", urging protesters to unite, build on their achievements, and strive to advance freedom within their campuses.

== Beginning of the 1989 protests ==
=== Death of Hu Yaobang ===
Student leaders
Name	Origin and affiliation
Chai Ling	Shandong; Beijing Normal University
Wu'erkaixi (Örkesh)	Xinjiang; Beijing Normal University
Wang Dan	Beijing; Peking University
Feng Congde	Sichuan; Peking University
Shen Tong	Beijing; Peking University
Wang Youcai	Zhejiang; Peking University
Li Lu	Hebei; Nanjing University
Zhou Yongjun	China University of Political Science and Law

After Hu Yaobang's sudden death of a heart attack on 15 April 1989, students reacted strongly, most believing his death was related to his forced resignation. Hu's death provided the initial impetus for students to gather in large numbers. On university campuses, many posters appeared eulogizing Hu, calling for honouring Hu's legacy. Within days, most posters were about broader political issues, such as corruption, democracy, and freedom of the press. Small, spontaneous gatherings to mourn Hu began on 15 April around the Monument to the People's Heroes at Tiananmen Square. On the same day, many students at Peking University (PKU) and Tsinghua University joined the gathering in Tiananmen Square in a piecemeal fashion. Small, organised student gatherings also took place in Xi'an and Shanghai on 16 April. On 17 April, students at the China University of Political Science and Law (CUPL) made a large wreath to commemorate Hu Yaobang. Its wreath-laying ceremony was on 17 April, and a larger-than-expected crowd assembled. At 5 pm, 500 CUPL students reached the eastern gate of the Great Hall of the People, near Tiananmen Square, to mourn Hu. The gathering featured speakers from various backgrounds who gave public orations commemorating Hu and discussed social problems. However, it was soon deemed obstructive to the Great Hall's operation, so police tried to persuade the students to disperse.

Starting on the night of 17 April, three thousand PKU students marched from the campus towards Tiananmen Square, and soon nearly a thousand students from Tsinghua joined. Upon arrival, they soon joined forces with those already gathered at the square. As its size grew, the gathering gradually evolved into a protest, as students began to draft a list of pleas and suggestions (the Seven Demands) for the government:

1. Affirm Hu Yaobang's views on democracy and freedom as correct.
2. Admit that the campaigns against spiritual pollution and bourgeois liberalisation had been wrong.
3. Publish information on the income of state leaders and their family members.
4. Allow privately run newspapers and stop press censorship.
5. Increase funding for education and raise intellectuals' pay.
6. End restrictions on demonstrations in Beijing.
7. Provide objective coverage of students in official media.

On the morning of 18 April, students remained in the square. Some gathered around the Monument to the People's Heroes, singing patriotic songs and listening to student organizers' impromptu speeches.

Others gathered at the Great Hall. Meanwhile, a few thousand students gathered at Xinhua Gate, the entrance to Zhongnanhai, the seat of the party leadership, where they demanded dialogue with the administration. On 19 April, they attempted to storm Zhongnanhai several times but were pushed back by police. Meanwhile, other students held aloft a banner that read "Freedom & Democracy Enlightenment" on the Monument, under a giant portrait of Hu Yaobang.

On 20 April, most students had been persuaded to leave Xinhua Gate. To disperse about 200 students that remained, police used batons; minor clashes were reported. Many students felt abused by the police, and rumours about police brutality spread quickly. The incident angered students on campus, where those who were not politically active decided to join the protests. Additionally, a group of workers calling themselves the Beijing Workers' Autonomous Federation issued two handbills challenging the central leadership.

Hu's state funeral took place on 22 April. On the evening of 21 April, some 100,000 students marched on Tiananmen Square, ignoring orders from Beijing municipal authorities that the square was to be closed for the funeral. The funeral, which took place inside the Great Hall and was attended by the leadership, was broadcast live to the students. General Secretary Zhao Ziyang delivered the eulogy. The funeral seemed rushed, lasting only 40 minutes, as emotions ran high in the square.

Security cordoned off the east entrance to the Great Hall of the People, but several students pressed forward. A few were allowed to cross the police line. Three of these students, Zhou Yongjun, Guo Haifeng, and Zhang Zhiyong, knelt on the steps of the Great Hall to present a petition and demanded to see Premier Li Peng. (Note: Analyst Richard Baum described their actions as "...a mock-ceremonial remonstrance... presenting their scrolled-up demands on hands and knees in the stylized, obsequious manner of an imperial petition." Political scientist Lucian Pye similarly described the act as "...in line with the classic Chinese tradition of aggrieved parties wailing before the Yamen door, of publicly dramatizing their unhappiness by petitioning officialdom... [they] sincerely believed that the officials would have to respond by meeting with them.") Standing beside them, a fourth student (Wu'erkaixi) made a brief, emotional speech begging for Li Peng to come out and speak with them. The larger number of students still in the square but outside the cordon were at times emotional, shouting demands or slogans and rushing toward police. Wu'erkaixi calmed the crowd as they waited for the Premier to emerge. However, no leaders emerged from the Great Hall, leaving the students disappointed and angry; some called for a classroom boycott.

On 21 April, students began organizing under the banners of formal organisations. On 23 April, in a meeting of about 40 students from 21 universities, the Beijing Students' Autonomous Federation (also known as the Union) was formed. It elected CUPL student Zhou Yongjun as chair. Wang Dan and Wu'erkaixi also emerged as leaders. The Union then called for a general classroom boycott at all Beijing universities. Such an independent organisation operating outside of party jurisdiction alarmed the leadership.

=== Rioting on 22 April ===
On 22 April, near dusk, serious rioting broke out in Changsha and Xi'an.

In Xi'an, arson by rioters destroyed cars and houses, and looting occurred in shops near the city's Xihua Gate. At Xincheng Square, a broadcast of Hu Yaobang's memorial was disrupted by rioters who attempted to force their way into a provincial government compound, smashing windows and setting parts of it on fire. They also stoned a bus filled with tourists near the square. The rioting destroyed 20 houses and 10 vehicles, and 130 policemen were reported injured.

In Changsha, crowds following a student march smashed windows of shops and cars, and a bus was reportedly commandeered. Chinese television showed images of the damage and injuries to shopkeepers. 38 stores were ransacked in the rioting. Over 350 people were arrested in both Changsha and Xi'an for looting.

In Wuhan, university students organised protests against the provincial government. As the situation became more volatile nationally, Zhao Ziyang called numerous meetings of the Politburo Standing Committee (PSC). Zhao stressed three points: discourage students from further protests and ask them to go back to class, use all measures necessary to combat rioting, and open forms of dialogue with students at different levels of government. Premier Li Peng called upon Zhao to condemn protestors and recognize the need to take more serious action. Zhao dismissed Li's views. Despite calls for him to remain in Beijing, Zhao left for a scheduled state visit to North Korea on 23 April.

=== 26 April Editorial ===
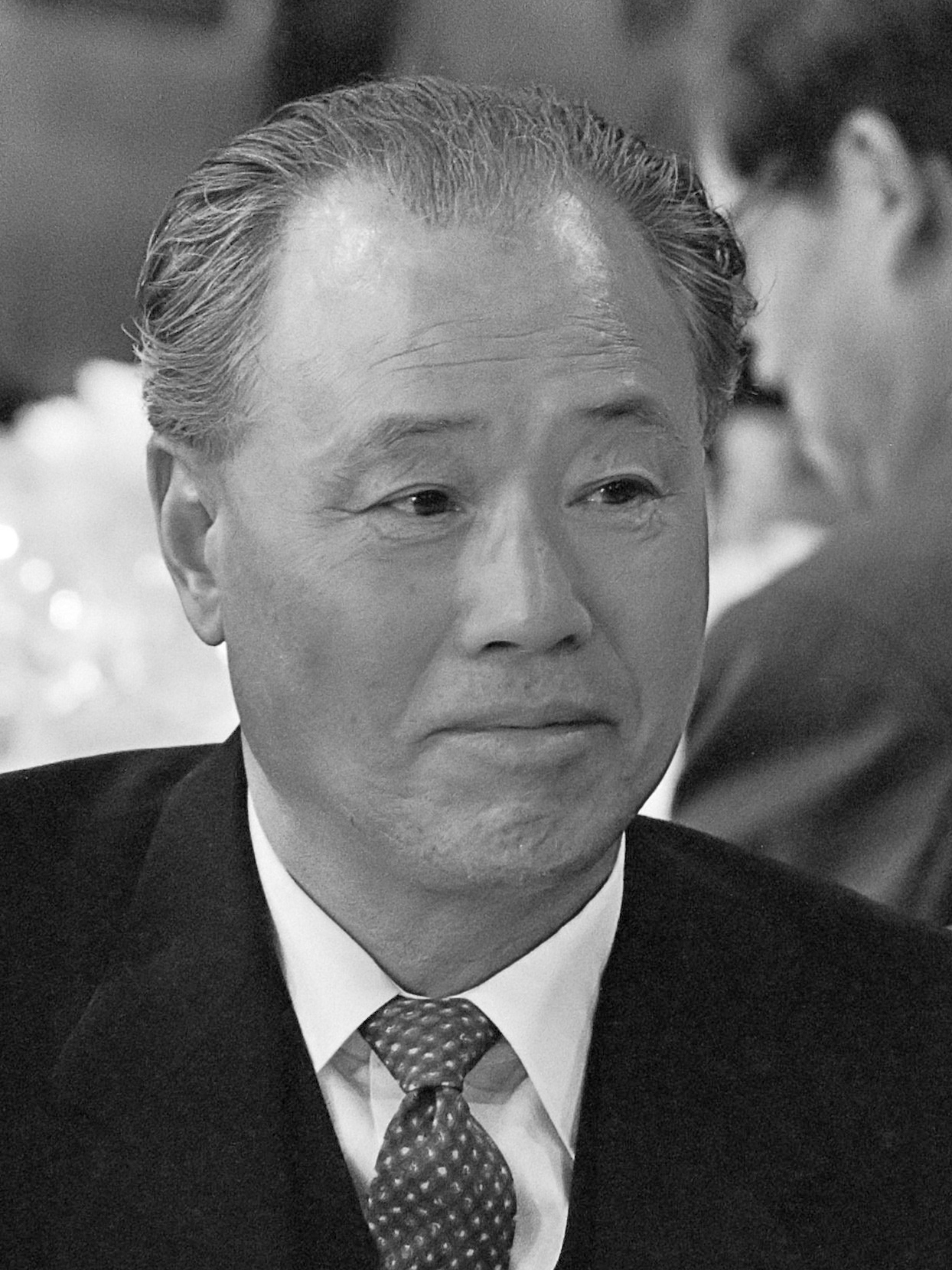
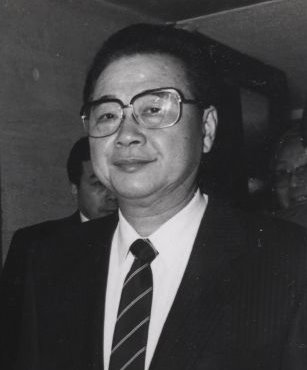
General Secretary Zhao Ziyang (left) who pushed for dialogue with students and Premier Li Peng (right) who declared martial law and backed military action

Zhao's departure to North Korea left Li Peng as the acting executive authority in Beijing. On 24 April, Li Peng and the PSC met with Beijing Party Secretary Li Ximing and mayor Chen Xitong to gauge the situation at the square. The municipal officials wanted a quick resolution to the crisis and framed the protests as a conspiracy to overthrow China's political system and prominent party leaders, including Deng Xiaoping. In Zhao's absence, the PSC agreed to take firm action against the protesters. On the morning of 25 April, President Yang Shangkun and Premier Li Peng met with Deng at the latter's residence. Deng endorsed a hardline stance and said an appropriate warning must be disseminated via mass media to curb further demonstrations. The meeting firmly established the first official evaluation of the protests, and highlighted Deng's having "final say" on important issues. Li Peng subsequently ordered Deng's views to be drafted as a communique and issued to all high-level Communist Party officials to mobilize the party apparatus against protesters.

On 26 April, the party's official newspaper People's Daily issued a front-page editorial titled "It is necessary to take a clear-cut stand against disturbances". The language in the editorial effectively branded the student movement to be an anti-party, anti-government revolt. The editorial invoked memories of the Cultural Revolution, using similar rhetoric that had been used during the 1976 Tiananmen Incident—an event that was initially branded an anti-government conspiracy but was later rehabilitated as "patriotic" under Deng's leadership. The article enraged students, who interpreted it as a direct indictment of the protests and its cause. The editorial backfired: instead of scaring students into submission, it antagonised the students and put them squarely against the government. The editorial's polarizing nature made it a major sticking point for the remainder of the protests.

=== 27 April demonstrations ===
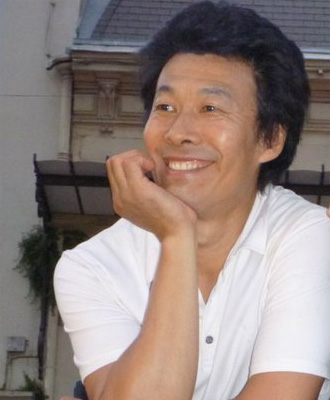
Han Dongfang, founder of the Beijing Workers' Autonomous Federation

Organized by the Union on 27 April, some 50,000–100,000 students from all Beijing universities marched through the streets of the capital to Tiananmen Square, breaking through lines set up by police, and receiving widespread public support along the way, particularly from factory workers. The student leaders, eager to show the patriotic nature of the movement, also toned down anti-Communist slogans, choosing to present a message of "anti-corruption" and "anti-cronyism", but "pro-party". In a twist of irony, student factions who genuinely called for the overthrow of the Communist Party gained traction due to the 26 April editorial.

The stunning success of the march forced the government into making concessions and meeting with student representatives. On 29 April, State Council spokesman Yuan Mu met with appointed representatives of government-sanctioned student associations. While the talks discussed a wide range of issues, including the editorial, the Xinhua Gate incident, and freedom of the press, they achieved few substantive results. Independent student leaders such as Wu'erkaixi refused to attend.

The government's tone grew increasingly conciliatory when Zhao Ziyang returned from Pyongyang on 30 April and reasserted his authority. In Zhao's view, the hardliner approach was not working, and the concession was the only alternative. Zhao asked that the press be allowed to positively report the movement and delivered two sympathetic speeches on 3–4 May. In the speeches, Zhao said that the students' concerns about corruption were legitimate and that the student movement was patriotic in nature. The speeches essentially negated the message presented by 26 April Editorial. While some 100,000 students marched on the streets of Beijing on 4 May to commemorate the May Fourth Movement and repeated demands from earlier marches, many students were satisfied with the government's concessions. On 4 May, all Beijing universities except PKU and BNU announced the end of the classroom boycott. Subsequently, most students began to lose interest in the movement.

== Escalation of the protests ==
=== Preparing for dialogue ===
The government was divided on how to respond to the movement as early as mid-April. After Zhao Ziyang's return from North Korea, tensions between the progressive camp and the conservative camp intensified. Those who supported continued dialogue and a soft approach with students rallied behind Zhao Ziyang, while hardliner conservatives opposed the movement rallied behind Premier Li Peng. Zhao and Li clashed at a PSC meeting on 1 May. Li maintained that the need for stability overrode all else, while Zhao said that the party should show support for increased democracy and transparency. Zhao pushed the case for further dialogue.

In preparation for dialogue, the Union elected representatives to a formal delegation. However, there was some friction as the Union leaders were reluctant to let the delegation unilaterally take control of the movement. The movement was slowed by a change to a more deliberate approach, fractured by internal discord, and increasingly diluted by declining engagement from the student body at large. In this context, a group of charismatic leaders, including Wang Dan and Wu'erkaixi, desired to regain momentum. They also distrusted the government's offers of dialogue, dismissing them as merely a ploy designed to play for time and pacify the students. To break from the moderate and incremental approach now adopted by other major student leaders, these few began calling for a return to more confrontational tactics. They settled on a plan of mobilizing students for a hunger strike that would begin on 13 May. Early attempts to mobilize others to join them met with only modest success until Chai Ling made an emotional appeal on the night before the strike was scheduled to begin.

=== Hunger strikes begin ===
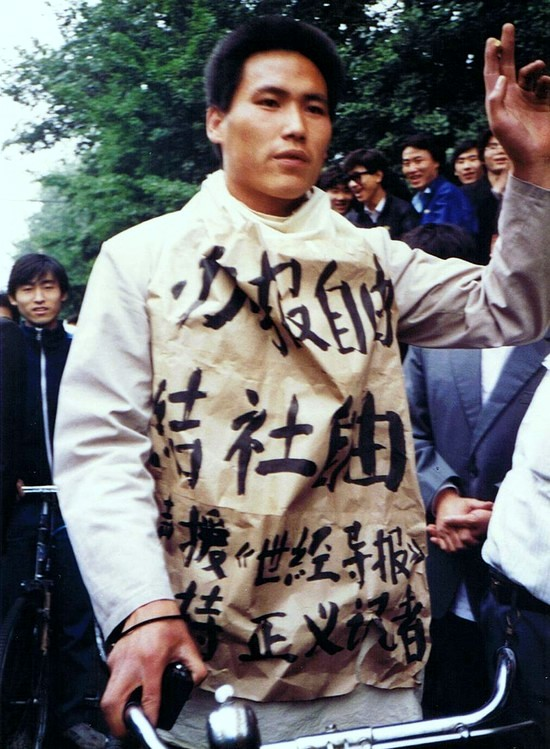
Photo of Pu Zhiqiang, student protester at Tiananmen, taken on 10 May. The words say: "We want the freedom of newspapers, freedom of associations, also to support the World Economic Herald, and support those just journalists."

Students began the hunger strike on 13 May, two days before the highly publicised state visit by Soviet leader Mikhail Gorbachev. Knowing that Gorbachev's welcoming ceremony was scheduled to be held on the square, student leaders wanted to use the hunger strike to force the government into meeting their demands. Moreover, the hunger strike gained widespread sympathy from the population at large and earned the student movement the moral high ground that it sought. By the afternoon of 13 May, some 300,000 were gathered at the square.

Inspired by the events in Beijing, protests and strikes began at universities in other cities, with many students travelling to Beijing to join the demonstration. Generally, the Tiananmen Square demonstration was well ordered, with daily marches of students from various Beijing-area colleges displaying their support of the classroom boycott and the protesters' demands. The students sang The Internationale, the world socialist anthem, on their way to, and while at, the square.

Afraid that the movement would spin out of control, Deng Xiaoping ordered the square to be cleared for Gorbachev's visit. Executing Deng's request, Zhao again used a soft approach and directed his subordinates to coordinate negotiations with students immediately. Zhao believed he could appeal to the students' patriotism. The students understood that signs of internal turmoil during the Sino-Soviet summit would embarrass the nation and not just the government. On the morning of 13 May, Yan Mingfu, head of the Communist Party's United Front, called an emergency meeting, gathering prominent student leaders and intellectuals, including Liu Xiaobo, Chen Ziming, and Wang Juntao. Yan said that the government was prepared to hold an immediate dialogue with student representatives. The Tiananmen welcoming ceremony for Gorbachev would be cancelled whether or not the students withdrew—in effect removing the bargaining power the students thought they possessed. The announcement sent the student leadership into disarray.

=== Mikhail Gorbachev's visit ===
Press restrictions were loosened significantly from early to mid-May. State media began broadcasting footage sympathetic to protesters and the movement, including the hunger strikers. On 14 May, intellectuals led by Dai Qing gained permission from Hu Qili to bypass government censorship and air the progressive views of the nation's intellectuals in the Guangming Daily. The intellectuals then issued an urgent appeal for the students to leave the square in an attempt to deescalate the conflict. However, many students believed that the intellectuals were speaking for the government and refused to move. That evening, formal negotiations took place between government representatives led by Yan Mingfu and student representatives led by Shen Tong and Xiang Xiaoji. Yan affirmed the student movement's patriotic nature and pleaded for the students to withdraw from the square. While Yan's apparent sincerity for compromise satisfied some students, the meeting grew increasingly chaotic as competing student factions relayed uncoordinated and incoherent demands to the leadership. Shortly after student leaders learned that the event had not been broadcast nationally, as initially promised by the government, the meeting fell apart. Yan then personally went to the square to appeal to the students, even offering himself to be held hostage. Yan also took the student's pleas to Li Peng the next day, asking Li to consider formally retracting the 26 April Editorial and rebranding the movement as "patriotic and democratic"; Li refused.

The students remained in the square during the Gorbachev visit; his welcoming ceremony was held at the airport. The Sino-Soviet summit, the first of its kind in some 30 years, marked the normalisation of Sino-Soviet relations and was seen as a breakthrough of tremendous historical significance for China's leaders. However, its smooth proceedings were derailed by the student movement; this created a major embarrassment ("loss of face") for the leadership on the global stage and drove many moderates in government onto a more hardline path. The summit between Deng and Gorbachev took place at the Great Hall of the People amid the backdrop of commotion and protest in the square. When Gorbachev met with Zhao on 16 May, Zhao told him, and by extension the international press, that Deng was still the "paramount authority" in China. Deng felt that this remark was Zhao's attempt to shift blame for mishandling the movement to him. Zhao's defence against this accusation was that privately informing world leaders that Deng was the true centre of power was standard operating procedure; Li Peng had made nearly identical private statements to US president George H. W. Bush in February 1989. Nevertheless, the statement marked a decisive split between the country's two most senior leaders.

=== Gathering momentum ===
From 17 May to 18 May, about a million Beijing residents, including PLA personnel, police officers, and lower party officials, demonstrated to call for the government to resume negotiations with the students. Many grassroots Party and Youth League organisations, as well as government-sponsored labour unions, encouraged their membership to demonstrate. In addition, several of China's non-Communist parties sent a letter to Li Peng to support the students. The Chinese Red Cross issued a special notice and sent in many personnel to provide medical services to the hunger strikers on the square. After the departure of Mikhail Gorbachev, many foreign journalists remained in the Chinese capital to cover the protests, shining an international spotlight on the movement. Western governments urged Beijing to exercise restraint.

The movement, on the wane at the end of April, now regained momentum. By 17 May, as students from across the country poured into the capital to join the movement, protests of various sizes occurred in some 400 Chinese cities. Students demonstrated at provincial party headquarters in Fujian, Hubei, and Xinjiang. Without a clearly articulated official position from the Beijing leadership, local authorities did not know how to respond. Because the demonstrations now included a wide array of social groups, each having its own set of grievances, it became increasingly unclear with whom the government should negotiate and what the demands were. The government, still split on how to deal with the movement, saw its authority and legitimacy gradually erode as the hunger strikers took the limelight and gained widespread sympathy. These combined circumstances put immense pressure on the authorities to act, and martial law was discussed as an appropriate response. Student leaders were put under close surveillance by the authorities; traffic cameras were used to perform surveillance on the square; and nearby restaurants, and wherever students gathered, were wiretapped. This surveillance led to the identification, capture, and punishment of protest participants.

The situation seemed intractable, and the weight of taking decisive action fell on paramount leader Deng Xiaoping. Matters came to a head on 17 May during a Politburo Standing Committee meeting at Deng's residence. At the meeting, Zhao Ziyang's concessions-based strategy, which called for the retraction of the 26 April Editorial, was thoroughly criticised. Li Peng, Yao Yilin, and Deng asserted that by making a conciliatory speech to the Asian Development Bank, on 4 May, Zhao had exposed divisions within the top leadership and emboldened the students. Deng warned that "there is no way to back down now without the situation spiraling out of control", and so "the decision is to move troops into Beijing to declare martial law" as a show of the government's no-tolerance stance. To justify martial law, the demonstrators were described as tools of "bourgeois liberalism" advocates who were pulling strings behind the scenes, as well as tools of elements within the party who wished to further their personal ambitions. For the rest of his life, Zhao Ziyang maintained that the decision was ultimately in Deng's hands: among the five PSC members present at the meeting, he and Hu Qili opposed the imposition of martial law, Li Peng and Yao Yilin firmly supported it, and Qiao Shi remained carefully neutral and noncommittal. Deng appointed the latter three to carry out the decision.

On the evening of 17 May, the PSC met at Zhongnanhai to finalize plans for martial law. At the meeting, Zhao announced that he was ready to "take leave", citing he could not bring himself to carry out martial law. The elders in attendance at the meeting, Bo Yibo and Yang Shangkun, urged the PSC to follow Deng's orders. Zhao did not consider the inconclusive PSC vote to have legally binding implications for martial law; Yang Shangkun, in his capacity as Vice Chairman of the Central Military Commission, mobilised the military to move into the capital.

Li Peng met with students for the first time on 18 May in an attempt to placate public concern over the hunger strike. During the talks, student leaders again demanded that the government rescind the 26 April Editorial and affirm the student movement as "patriotic". Li Peng said the government's main concern was sending the hunger strikers to hospitals. The discussions were confrontational and yielded little substantive progress, but gained student leaders prominent airtime on national television. By this point, those calling for the overthrow of the party and Li Peng and Deng became prominent both in Beijing and in other cities.

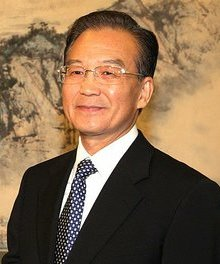
Wen Jiabao, then chief of the Party's General Office, accompanied Zhao Ziyang to meet students in the square, surviving the political purge of the party's liberals and later serving as Premier from 2003 to 2013.

In the early morning of 19 May, Zhao Ziyang went to Tiananmen in what became his political swan song. He was accompanied by Wen Jiabao. Li Peng also went to the square but left shortly thereafter. At 4:50 am Zhao made a speech with a bullhorn to a crowd of students, urging them to end the hunger strike. He told the students that they were still young and urged them to stay healthy and not to sacrifice themselves without due concern for their futures. Zhao's emotional speech was applauded by some students. It would be his last public appearance.

Students, we came too late. We are sorry. You talk about us, criticize us, it is all necessary. The reason that I came here is not to ask you to forgive us. All I want to say is that students are getting very weak. It is the 7th day since you went on a hunger strike. You can't continue like this. [...] You are still young, there are still many days yet to come, you must live healthily, and see the day when China accomplishes the Four Modernisations. You are not like us. We are already old. It doesn't matter to us anymore.

— Zhao Ziyang at Tiananmen Square, 19 May 1989

=== Outside Beijing ===
On 19 April, the editors of the World Economic Herald, a magazine close to reformists, decided to publish a commemorative section on Hu. Inside was an article by Yan Jiaqi, which commented favourably on the Beijing student protests, and called for a reassessment of Hu's 1987 purge. Sensing the conservative political trends in Beijing, Jiang Zemin demanded that the article be censored, and many newspapers were printed with a blank page. Jiang then suspended lead editor Qin Benli, his decisive action earning the trust of conservative party elders, who praised Jiang's loyalty.

On 27 May, over 300,000 people in Hong Kong gathered at Happy Valley Racecourse for a gathering called the Concert for Democracy in China (Chinese: 民主歌聲獻中華). Many Hong Kong celebrities sang songs and expressed their support for the students in Beijing. The following day, a procession of 1.5 million people, one fourth of Hong Kong's population, led by Martin Lee, Szeto Wah, and other organisation leaders, paraded through Hong Kong Island. Across the world, especially where ethnic Chinese lived, people gathered and protested. Many governments, including those of the United States and Japan, issued travel warnings against travelling to China.

== Military action ==
=== Martial law ===
The Chinese government declared martial law on 20 May and mobilised at least 30 divisions from five of the country's seven military regions. At least 14 of the PLA's 24 army corps contributed troops. Guangzhou's civil aviation authorities suspended civil airline travel to prepare for transporting military units.

The army's initial entry into the capital was blocked in the suburbs by throngs of protesters. Seeing no way forward, the authorities ordered the army to withdraw on 24 May. All government forces then retreated to bases outside the city.

Defying martial law, students entertained themselves with music, drinking, and smoking on the square. At the same time, internal divisions intensified within the student movement itself. By late May, the students became increasingly disorganised with no clear leadership or unified course of action. Moreover, Tiananmen Square was overcrowded and facing serious hygiene problems. Hou Dejian suggested an open election of the student leadership to speak for the movement but was met with opposition. Meanwhile, Wang Dan moderated his position, ostensibly sensing the impending military action and its consequences. He advocated for a temporary withdrawal from Tiananmen Square to re-group on campus, but this was opposed by hardline student factions who wanted to hold the square. The increasing internal friction would lead to struggles for control of the loudspeakers in the middle of the square in a series of "mini-coups": whoever controlled the loudspeakers was "in charge" of the movement. Some students would wait at the train station to greet arrivals of students from other parts of the country in an attempt to enlist factional support. Student groups began accusing each other of ulterior motives, such as collusion with the government and trying to gain personal fame from the movement. Some students even tried to oust Chai Ling and Feng Congde from their leadership positions in an attempted kidnapping, an action Chai called a "well-organised and premeditated plot".

Unlike more moderate student leaders, Chai seemed willing to allow the student movement to end in a violent confrontation. In an interview given in late May, Chai stated:

What we actually are hoping for is bloodshed, the moment when the government is ready to brazenly butcher the people. Only when the Square is awash with blood will the people of China open their eyes.

— Chai Ling, The Gate of Heavenly Peace

However, she felt that she was unable to convince her fellow students of this. She also claimed that her expectation of a violent crackdown was something she had heard from Li Lu and not an idea of her own.

On 30 May, the protesters erected the 10-metre-tall Goddess of Democracy at Tiananmen Square made of foam and papier-mâché.

=== 1 June ===
==== Li Peng's Report ====
On 1 June, Li Peng issued a report titled "On the True Nature of the Turmoil", which was circulated to every member of the Politburo. The report concludes that the demonstrators' leadership, referred to as a "tiny minority", had "organised and plotted the turmoil", and that they were using the square as a base to provoke conflict in order to create an international impact. It also maintains that they had formed connections with criminal elements and used funding from foreign and domestic sources to improve their communications equipment and procure weapons.

==== MSS Report ====
On the same day, another report, issued by Ministry of State Security chief Jia Chunwang, was submitted to the party leadership, and likewise sent to every member of the Politburo, as well as to senior Party elders, including Deng Xiaoping, Li Xiannian and Chen Yun.

The report emphasized the danger of infiltration of bourgeois liberalism into China and the negative effect that Western ideological influence, particularly from the United States, had on the students. The MSS had determined that the United States had infiltrated the student movement by various means, including the use of the U.S. government-owned Voice of America radio station as an instrument of psychological warfare, as well as the cultivation of pro-American ideologies among Chinese students studying abroad as a long-term strategy. Furthermore, the report also resolved that U.S. intelligence had made efforts to get close to leaders of several Chinese institutions; according to the report, a CIA agent from the U.S. Embassy had nearly fifty contacts between 1981 and 1988, fifteen of whom were associated with the Economic Restructuring Commission. The report advocated for immediate military action, and was viewed as providing one of the best justifications for it.

=== 2–3 June ===
In conjunction with the plan to clear the square by force, the Politburo received word from army headquarters stating that troops were ready to help stabilize the capital and that they understood the necessity and legality of martial law to overcome the turmoil.

On 2 June, with increasing action on the part of protesters, the government saw that it was time to act. Protests broke out as newspapers published articles that called for the students to leave Tiananmen Square and end the movement. Many of the students in the square were not willing to leave and were outraged by the articles. They were also outraged by the Beijing Daily's 1 June article "Tiananmen, I Cry for You", which was written by a fellow student who had become disillusioned with the movement, as he thought it was chaotic and disorganised. In response to the articles, thousands of students lined the streets of Beijing to protest against leaving the square.

Three intellectuals—Liu Xiaobo, Zhou Duo, and Gao Xin—and Taiwanese singer Hou Dejian declared a second hunger strike to revive the movement. After weeks of occupying the square, the students were tired, and internal rifts opened between moderate and hardline student groups. In their declaration speech, the hunger strikers openly criticised the government's suppression of the movement, to remind the students that their cause was worth fighting for and pushing them to continue their occupation of the square.

On 2 June, Deng Xiaoping and several party elders met with the three PSC members—Li Peng, Qiao Shi, and Yao Yilin—who remained after Zhao Ziyang and Hu Qili had been ousted. The committee members agreed to clear the square so "the riot can be halted and order be restored to the Capital". They also agreed that the square needed to be cleared as peacefully as possible; but if protesters did not cooperate, the troops would be authorised to use force to complete the job. That day, state-run newspapers reported that troops were positioned in ten key areas in the city. Units of the 27th, 65th, and 24th armies were secretly moved into the Great Hall of the People on the west side of the square and the Ministry of Public Security compound east of the square.

On the evening of 2 June, an accident occurred in which a PAP jeep ran onto a sidewalk, killing three civilian pedestrians and injuring a fourth. This incident sparked fear that the army and the police were trying to advance into Tiananmen Square. Student leaders issued emergency orders to set up roadblocks at major intersections to prevent the entry of troops into the centre of the city.

On the morning of 3 June, students and citizens intercepted and questioned a busload of plainclothed soldiers at Xinjiekou. Isolated pockets of soldiers were similarly surrounded and interrogated.

The soldiers were beaten by the crowd, as were Beijing security personnel who attempted to aid the soldiers. Some of the soldiers were kidnapped when they attempted to head for the hospital. Several other buses carrying weapons, gear, and supplies were intercepted and boarded around Tiananmen.

At 1 pm, a crowd intercepted one of these buses at Liubukou, and several men raised military helmets on bayonets to show the rest of the crowd. At 2:30 pm, a clash broke out between protesters and police. The police attempted to disperse the crowd with tear gas, but demonstrators counterattacked and threw rocks, forcing them to retreat inside the Zhongnanhai compound through the west gate.

At 5:30 pm, several thousand troops awaiting orders began to retreat from the Great Hall of the People. That evening, the government leaders continued to monitor the situation.

=== 3–4 June ===
External videos
- BBC News archive footage

In the evening on 3 June, the government issued an emergency announcement urging citizens to "stay off the streets and away from Tiananmen Square". Meanwhile, protesters made their own broadcasts across various university campuses in Beijing to call for students and citizens to arm themselves and assemble at intersections and the Square.

==== Chang'an Avenue ====
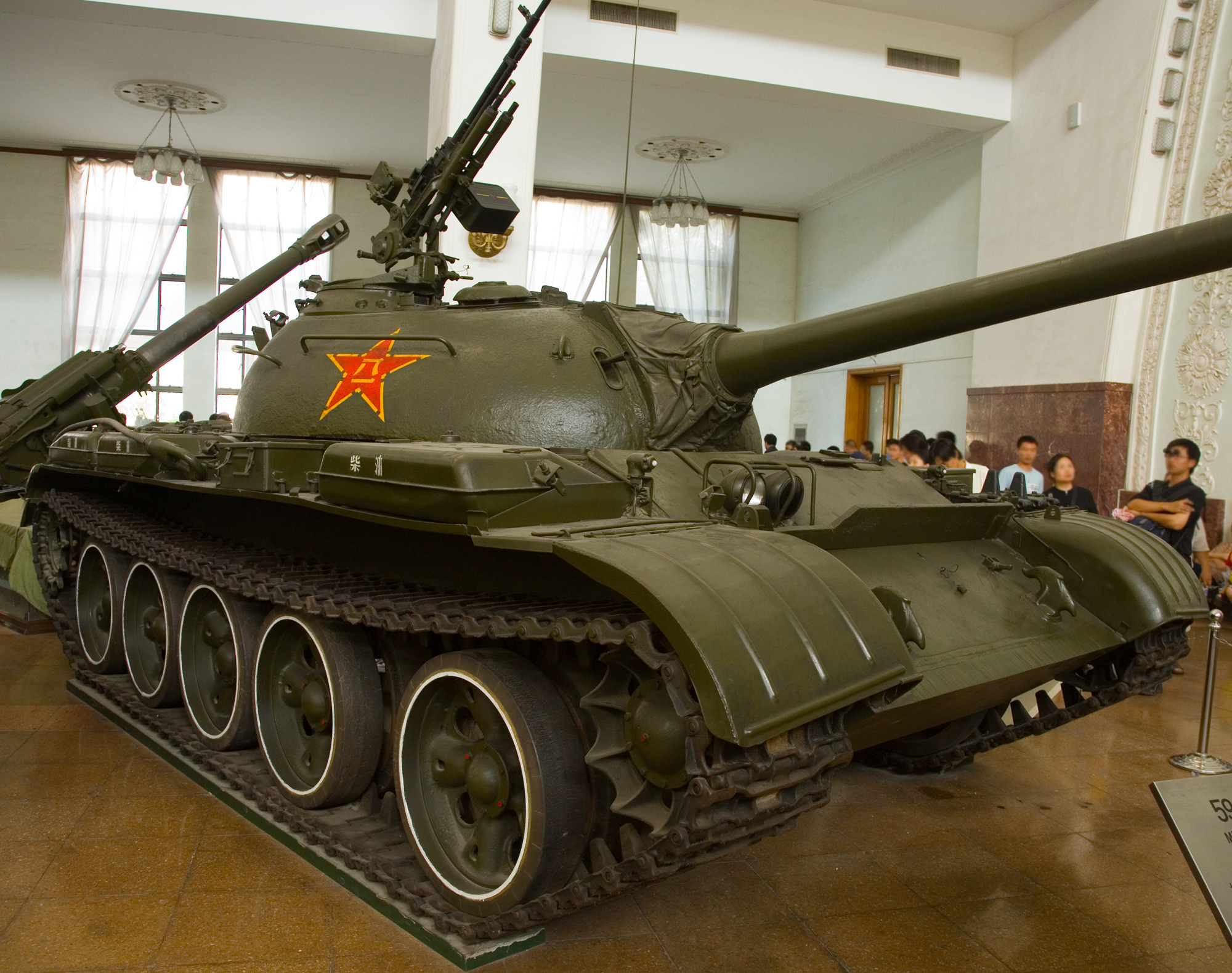
The Type 59 main battle tank, on display at the Military Museum of the Chinese People's Revolution in western Beijing, was deployed by the People's Liberation Army on 3 June 1989.

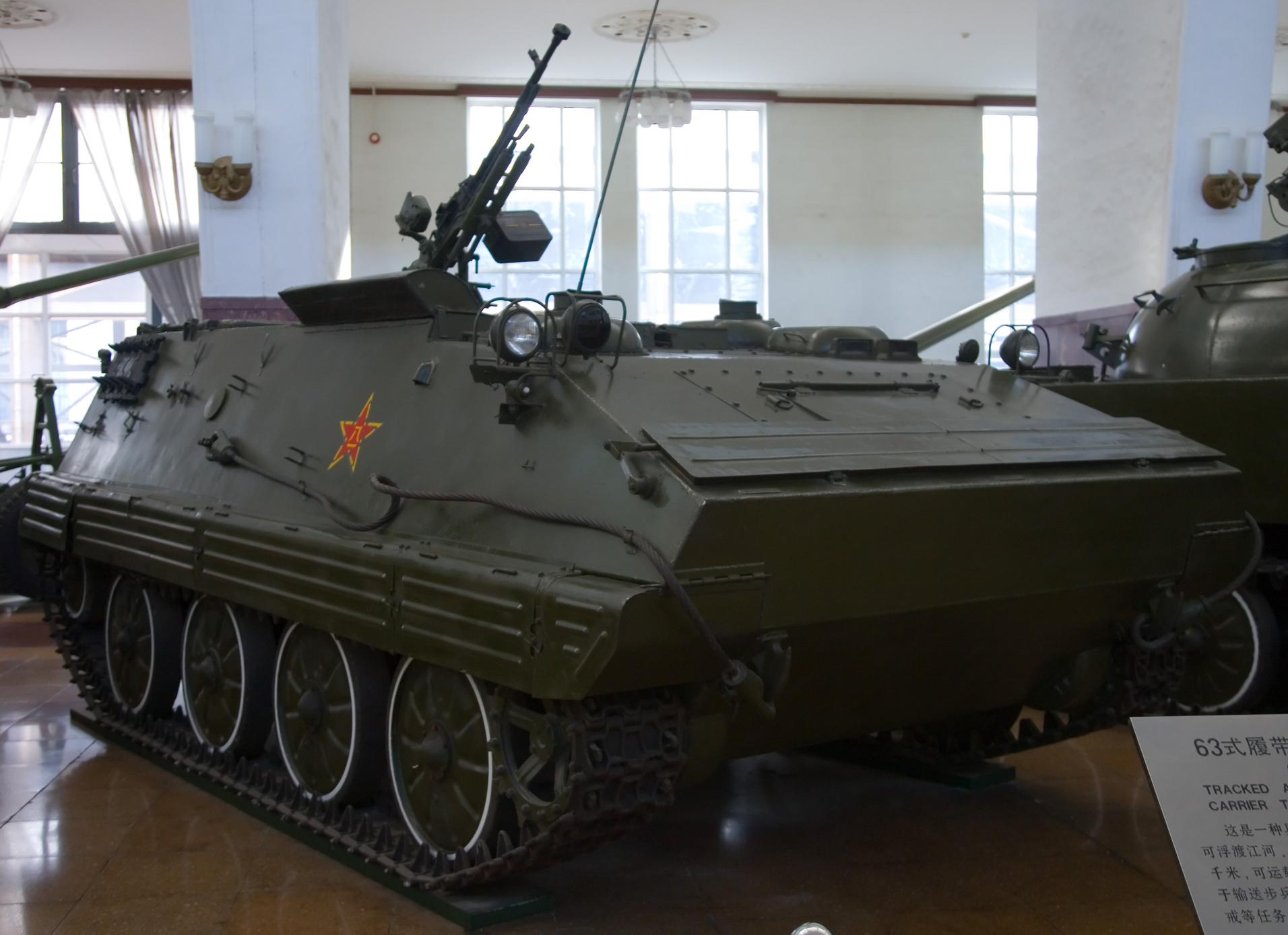
Type 63 armoured personnel carrier deployed by the People's Liberation Army in Beijing in 1989

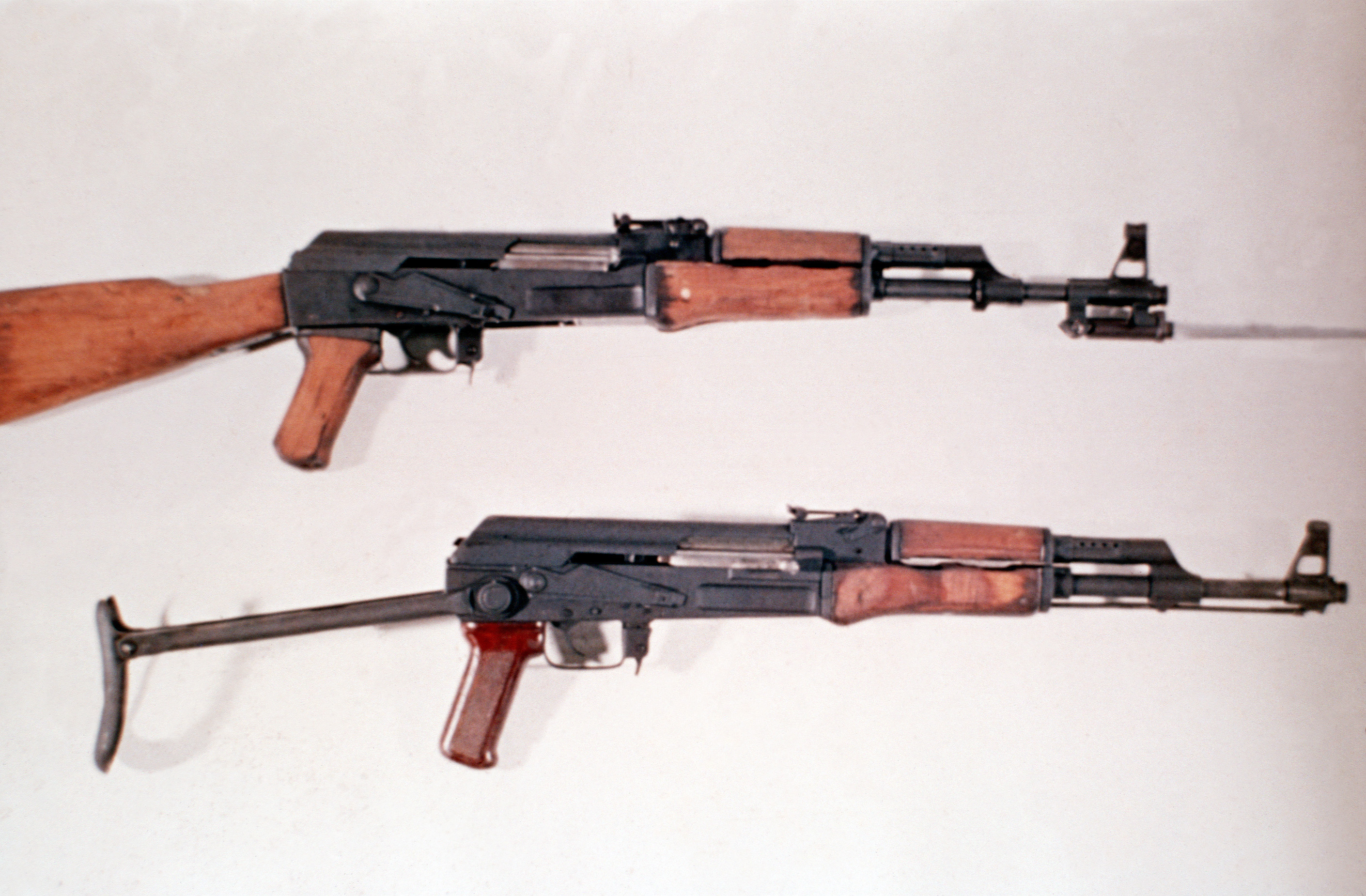
Type 56 assault rifles, used by soldiers during the crackdown

On 3 June, at 8:00 p.m., the 38th Army, led by interim commander Zhang Meiyuan, began to advance from military office compounds in Shijingshan and Fentai District in western Beijing along the western extension of Chang'an Avenue toward the square to the east. At 9:30 p.m, this army encountered a blockade set up by protesters at Gongzhufen in Haidian District, and made an attempt to break through. Fighting erupted when protesters, in an effort to push the army back, threw rocks, molotov cocktails, and other objects at troops armed with anti-riot gear, who began firing rubber bullets and tear gas and attacking with electric prods and batons.

Other troops fired warning shots into the air, which was ineffective. At 10:10 pm, an army officer picked up a megaphone and urged the protesters to disperse.

At about 10:30 p.m., still being pummelled by rocks thrown by protesters, the 38th Army troops opened fire with live ammunition. The crowds were stunned that the army was using live ammunition and fell back towards Muxidi Bridge. The troops used expanding bullets, prohibited by international law for use in warfare between countries but not for other uses.

The advance of the army was again halted by another blockade at Muxidi, about 5 km west of the square. After protesters repelled an attempt by an anti-riot brigade to storm the bridge, regular troops advanced on the crowd and turned their weapons on them. Soldiers alternated between shooting into the air and firing directly at protesters. As the army advanced, fatalities were recorded along Chang'an Avenue. The largest number occurred in the two-mile stretch of road running from Muxidi to Xidan, where "65 PLA trucks and 47 APCs ... were totally destroyed, and 485 other military vehicles were damaged." Although troops advanced into Beijing from all directions, the majority of deaths during the night of 3 June occurred around the Muxidi area.

Throughout the street fighting, demonstrators attacked troops with poles, rocks, and molotov cocktails; Jeff Widener reported witnessing rioters setting fire to military vehicles and beating the soldiers inside them to death. On one avenue in western Beijing, anti-government protestors torched a military convoy of more than 100 trucks and armoured vehicles. They also hijacked an armoured personnel carrier, taking it on a joy ride. These scenes were captured on camera and broadcast by Chinese state television.

In the evening, a firefight broke out between soldiers and demonstrators at Shuangjing.

On 5 June 1989, The Wall Street Journal reported on the fighting: "As columns of tanks and tens of thousands of soldiers approached Tiananmen, many troops were set on by angry mobs who screamed, 'Fascists'. Dozens of soldiers were pulled from trucks, severely beaten, and left for dead. At an intersection west of the square, the body of a young soldier, who had been beaten to death, was stripped naked and hung from the side of a bus. Another soldier's corpse was strung up at an intersection east of the square."

==== Clearing the square ====
At the Square, soldiers and students initially attempted to show restraint, but residents refused to follow student orders. Soldiers did not fight back at first after some citizens threw rocks at them.

In the early morning on 4 June, the first APC entered Tiananmen Square from Chang'an West Boulevard. Demonstrators attacked the APC with molotov cocktails and immobilised it with a traffic divider, before covering it with gasoline-doused blankets and setting it on fire. Wu Renhua claims that after the three occupants were forced out of the vehicle by the heat, students escorted the three men to a medic station. However, according to an eyewitness account of a Chinese-American reporter, the soldiers were attacked by the crowd. Two soldiers were burned alive inside the APC, and a third was dragged out of the vehicle and beaten to death in full view of other soldiers. Larry Wortzel, a military intelligence officer at the U.S. Embassy at the time, noted that the demonstrators' swarming tactics were clearly rehearsed and practiced, having been used similarly in other places around the city.

Troops from the west arrived at the square at about 1:30 am, and troops from other directions gradually arrived as well, blocking main roads to the square to prevent entry. A second emergency announcement from the government was broadcast on loudspeakers:

A severe counterrevolutionary riot has broken out in the capital tonight. Rioters have savagely attacked soldiers of the PLA, have stolen their weapons and burned their vehicles, have erected roadblocks, and have kidnapped officers and soldiers [...] Citizens and students must evacuate the Square immediately so that martial law troops can successfully carry out their mission. We cannot guarantee the safety of violators, who will be solely responsible for any consequences.

— Emergency Announcement, Beijing Municipal Government and Martial Law Command

After the announcement, most people in the square began to leave, and by 2:00 am, there were only a few thousand demonstrators in the square. North of the square, a dozen students and citizens attempted to torch army trucks with cans of gasoline but were arrested.

At 3:00 am, Hou Dejian, Liu Xiaobo, Zhou Duo, and Gao Xin decided to convince the students to evacuate the square; Chai Ling, however, insisted that "those who wish to leave may leave, and those who don't may stay." The group asked Chai Ling and other student leaders to negotiate a peaceful evacuation. Hou Dejian addressed the students by loudspeaker, urging them to leave the square and surrender their rifles and other weapons, before leaving with Zhou Duo in an ambulance to meet the government troops.

Between 3:30 and 3:45 am, the ambulance arrived at the Museum of Chinese History in the northeast corner of the square, and Hou Dejian and Zhou Duo met with Ji Xinguo, a regimental political commissar. They requested that the army give them time to evacuate, and to open a path for them to leave. Ji Xinguo relayed their request to Martial Law Headquarters, who agreed to the students' request. Ji Xinguo informed them of this and told them to exit to the south. After Hou and Zhou returned to the square, they called for an immediate evacuation, and the Martial Law Headquarters announced, "Students, we appreciate that you will leave the Square voluntarily. Students, please leave in the southeastern direction."

There was initial reluctance among the students to leave, but as the deadline approached, Feng Congde asked students for a voice vote on whether to stay or leave. Although the vote's results were inconclusive, Feng said the vote to leave was louder. The demonstrators began to evacuate, with students leaving under their school banners, heading southeast. At about 4:35 am, a few minutes after the demonstrators started to retreat, the lights in the square were turned on, and troops began to advance. A squad of commandos charged up the monument and shot out the students' loudspeaker. According to Hou Dejian, tear gas was used during the operation to clear the square.

At 5:23 am, a Chinese armoured car rammed the Goddess of Democracy statue several times, and then removed its severed torch after it collapsed as a memento.

Having removed the students from the square, soldiers were ordered to relinquish their ammunition, after which they were allowed a short reprieve, from 7 am to 9 am. The debris left over from the student occupation was either piled and burnt on the square or placed in large plastic bags that were then airlifted away by military helicopters. After the cleanup, the troops stationed at The Great Hall of the People remained confined within for the next nine days. During this time, the soldiers were apparently left to sleep on the floors and were daily supplied a single packet of instant noodles shared between three men.

==== In the city ====
Just past 6:00 on 4 June, as a convoy of students who had vacated the square were walking westward in the bicycle lane along Chang'an Avenue back to campus, three tanks pursued them from the square, firing tear gas. One tank proceeded to ram the crowd, killing 11 students and injuring scores of others.

By dawn, the sky was enveloped with smoke rising from the centre of the city, and the streets were filled with burned-out vehicles. Skirmishes between protesters and troops continued sporadically in the city. Some demonstrators regrouped and attempted to re-enter the square from the northeast on East Chang'an Avenue, but were driven off by gunfire. The square remained closed to the public for two weeks.

At 17:00, a sitrep from the U.S. State Department to the U.S. Embassy indicated that the PLA was "mopping up isolated resistance".

=== 5 June and the Tank Man ===
"Tank Man" temporarily stopping the advance of four Type 59 tanks

On June 5, having secured the square, the military began to reassert control over thoroughfares through the city, especially Chang'an Avenue. A column of tanks of the 1st Armored Division left the square and, heading east on Chang'an Avenue, came upon a lone protester standing in the middle of the avenue. The brief standoff between the man and the tanks was captured by Western media atop the Beijing Hotel. After returning to his position in front of the tanks, the man was pulled aside by a group of people. Charlie Cole, who was there for Newsweek, claimed that the men were Chinese government agents, while Jan Wong, who was there for The Globe and Mail, thought that they were concerned bystanders. Contemporary sources and Timothy Brook's analysis identified Tank Man as 19-year-old Wang Weilin, son of a factory worker, who was subsequently sentenced to ten years in prison. Although the fate of Tank Man following the demonstration is not known, paramount Chinese leader Jiang Zemin stated in 1990 that he did not think the man was killed. Time later named him one of the 100 most influential people of the 20th century.

A stopped convoy of 37 APCs on Changan Boulevard at Muxidi was forced to abandon their vehicles after becoming stuck among an assortment of burned-out buses and military vehicles. In addition to occasional incidents of soldiers opening fire on civilians in Beijing, Western news outlets reported clashes between units of the PLA. Late in the afternoon, 26 tanks, three armoured personnel carriers, and supporting infantry took up defensive positions facing east at Jianguomen and Fuxingmen overpasses. Shellfire was heard throughout the night, and the next morning a United States Marine in the eastern part of the city reported spotting a damaged armoured vehicle that an armour-piercing shell had disabled. The ongoing turmoil in the capital disrupted everyday life flow. No editions of the People's Daily were available in Beijing on 5 June, despite assurances that they had been printed. Many shops, offices, and factories were not able to open, as workers remained in their homes, and public transit services were limited to the subway and suburban bus routes.

By and large, the government regained control in the week following the square's military seizure. A political purge followed in which officials responsible for organizing or condoning the protests were removed, and protest leaders were jailed.

=== Protests outside Beijing ===
After order was restored in Beijing on 4 June, protests of various sizes continued in some 80 other Chinese cities outside the international press's spotlight. In the British colony of Hong Kong, people again took to wearing black in solidarity with the demonstrators in Beijing. There were also protests in other countries, where many adopted the wearing of black armbands as well.

In Shanghai, students marched on the streets on 5 June and erected roadblocks on major thoroughfares. Public transport including railway traffic was blocked. On 6 June, the municipal government tried to clear the rail blockade, but it was met with fierce resistance from the crowds. Several people were killed from being run over by a train. On 7 June, students from major Shanghai universities stormed various campus facilities to erect biers. Although there were rumours of possible martial law in the city, the situation was gradually brought under control without deadly force. The municipal government gained recognition from the top leadership in Beijing for averting a major upheaval.

In the interior cities of Xi'an, Wuhan, Nanjing, and Chengdu, many students continued protests after 4 June, often erecting roadblocks. In Chengdu, large protests were violently crushed by security forces on 4 and 5 June, with eyewitnesses reporting "300 to 400 people killed". In Xi'an, students stopped workers from entering factories. In Wuhan, students blocked the Yangtze River Railway bridge and another 4,000 gathered at the railway station. About one thousand students staged a railroad "sit-in", and rail traffic on the Beijing-Guangzhou and Wuhan-Dalian lines was interrupted. The students also urged employees of major state-owned enterprises to go on strike. In Wuhan, the situation was so tense that residents reportedly began a bank run and resorted to panic buying.

=== Government's pronouncements ===
At a news conference on 6 June, State Council spokesperson Yuan Mu announced that based on "preliminary statistics", "nearly 300 people died ... includ[ing] soldiers", 23 students, "bad elements who deserve[d] this because of their crimes, and people who were killed by mistake." He said the wounded included "5,000 [police] officers and [soldiers]" and over "2,000 civilians, including the handful of lawless ruffians and the onlooking masses who do understand the situation." Military spokesperson Zhang Gong stated that no one was killed in Tiananmen Square and no one was run over by tanks in the square.

On 9 June, Deng Xiaoping, appearing in public for the first time since the protests began, delivered a speech praising the "martyrs" (PLA soldiers who had died). Deng stated that the goal of the student movement was to overthrow the party and the state. Of the protesters, Deng said: "Their goal is to establish a totally Western-dependent bourgeois republic." Deng argued that protesters had complained about corruption to cover their real motive, replacing the socialist system. He said that "the entire imperialist Western world plans to make all socialist countries discard the socialist road and then bring them under the monopoly of international capital and onto the capitalist road."

== Death toll ==
From the end of the events on, the number of people who died in the square itself has been in dispute. The government actively suppressed discussion of casualty figures immediately after the events, and estimates rely heavily on eyewitness testimony, hospital records, and organised efforts by victims' relatives. As a result, large discrepancies exist among various casualty estimates. Initial estimates ranged from the official figure of a few hundred to several thousand.

=== Official figures ===
Official government announcements shortly after the event put the number who died at about 300. According to East German Politburo member Günter Schabowski, Jiang Zemin told him that "around 400 people" had died during a visit shortly after the massacre. At the State Council press conference on 6 June, spokesman Yuan Mu said that "preliminary tallies" by the government showed that about 300 civilians and soldiers died, including 23 students from universities in Beijing, along with some people he described as "ruffians". Yuan also said some 5,000 soldiers and police were wounded, along with 2,000 civilians. On 19 June, Beijing Party Secretary Li Ximing reported to the Politburo that the government's confirmed death toll was 241, including 218 civilians (of which 36 were students), 10 PLA soldiers, and 13 People's Armed Police, along with 7,000 wounded. On 30 June, Mayor Chen Xitong said that the number of injured was about 6,000.

=== Other estimates ===
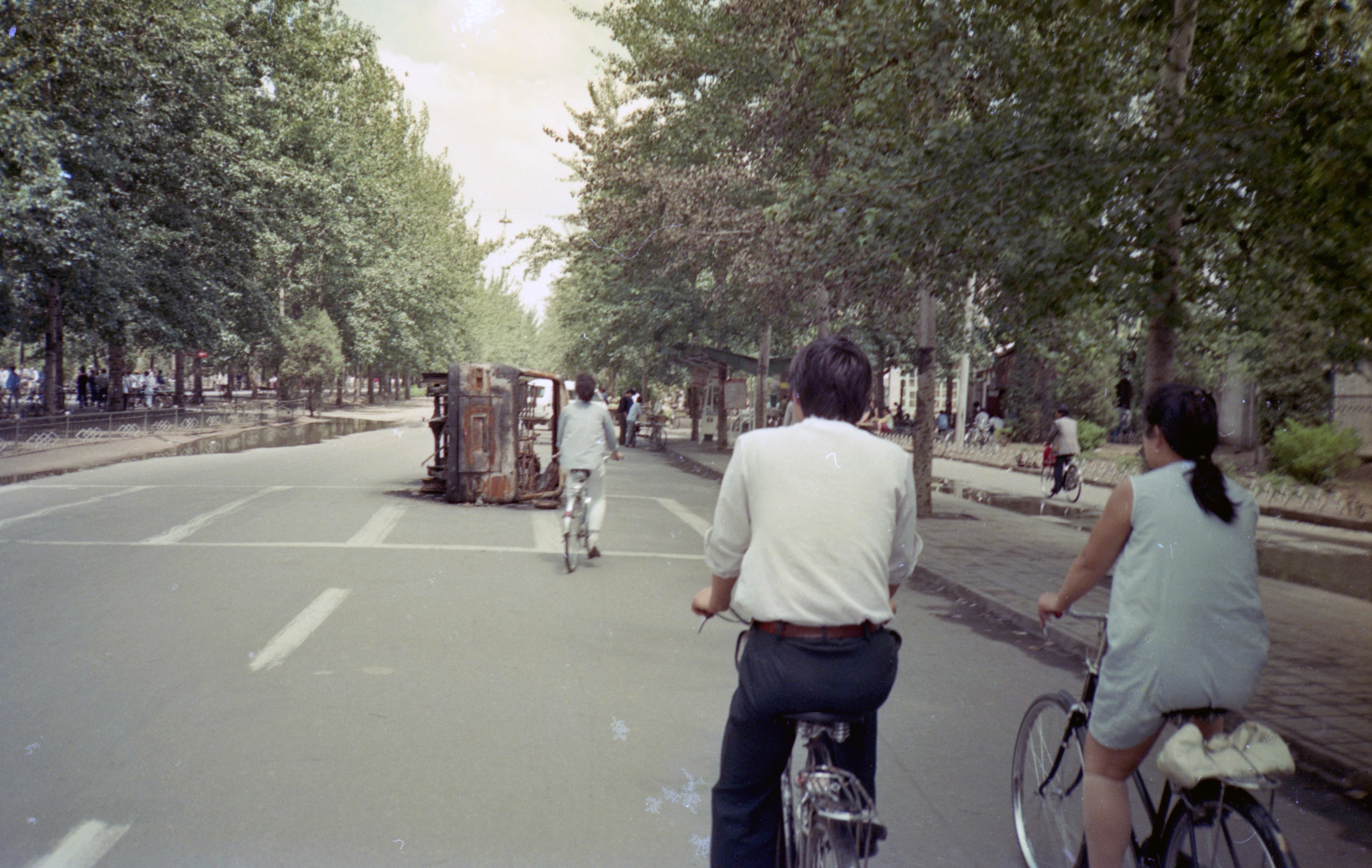
A burned-out vehicle on a Beijing street a few days after 6 June

On the morning of 4 June, many estimates of deaths were reported, including from government-affiliated sources. Peking University leaflets circulated on campus suggested a death toll of between two and three thousand. The Chinese Red Cross was rumoured to have given a figure of 2,600 deaths, but the organization denied having given such a figure. The Swiss Ambassador had estimated 2,700, following a visit to Beijing's hospitals. Records from Beijing's main eleven hospitals, compiled shortly after the events, recorded at least 478 dead and 920 wounded, though Timothy Brook notes that these figures are an undercount due to lack of information from other hospitals. Jonathan Fenby puts the death toll at over 700 in his book.

Nicholas D. Kristof of The New York Times wrote on 21 June that "it seems plausible that about a dozen soldiers and policemen were killed, along with 400 to 800 civilians." United States ambassador James Lilley said that, based on visits to hospitals around Beijing, a minimum of several hundred had been killed. A declassified National Security Agency cable filed on the same day estimated 180–500 deaths up to the morning of 4 June. Amnesty International's estimates put the number of deaths at between several hundred and close to 1,000, while a Western diplomat who compiled estimates put the number at 300 to 1,000.

In a highly disputed cable sent in 24 hours after the events at Tiananmen, British Ambassador Alan Donald initially claimed, based on information from a "good friend" in the State Council of China, that a minimum of 10,000 civilians died, claims which were repeated in a speech by Australian Prime Minister Bob Hawke, but which is an estimated number much higher than other sources. After the declassification, student protest leader Feng Congde pointed out that Donald later revised his estimate to 2,700–3,400 deaths, a number closer to, but still much higher than, other estimates. Timothy Brook also finds that claims of 10,000 fatalities are "extravagant" and "unconvincing".

=== Identifying the dead ===
The Tiananmen Mothers, a victims' advocacy group co-founded by Ding Zilin and Zhang Xianling, whose children were killed by the government during the crackdown, have identified 202 victims as of August 2011. In the face of government interference, the group has worked painstakingly to locate victims' families and collect information about the victims. Their tally had grown from 155 in 1999 to 202 in 2011, where it remains in 2026. The list includes four individuals who committed suicide on or after 4 June for reasons related to their involvement in the demonstrations. (Note: Zou Bing (邹冰; victim No. 51), a 19-year-old student at the Beijing Broadcasting Institute, hanged herself in September 1989 because of her inability to endure interrogation into her involvement in the protest; Ren Jianmin (任建民; victim No. 106) was a farmer from Hebei who was passing through the city and wounded by gunfire in the stomach on 4 June. He was unable to afford medical bills and hanged himself in August because of unbearable pain; Qi Li (齐力; victim No. 162), a student at the Central Academy of Drama, hanged himself for escaping the pressure of post-protest investigations at his school; Wei Wumin (韦武民; victim No. 163), also a student at the Central Academy of Drama, who participated in the hunger strike, committed suicide by standing in front of an oncoming train.)

=== Deaths around and in Tiananmen Square itself ===
Government officials have long asserted that no one died in the square in the early morning hours of 4 June, during the "hold-out" of students' last batch in the south part of the square. Initially, foreign media reports of a "massacre" on the square were prevalent, though subsequently, journalists have acknowledged that most of the deaths occurred outside of the square in western Beijing. Several people who were situated around the square that night, including former Beijing bureau chief of The Washington Post Jay Mathews (Note: Jay Mathews, former Beijing bureau chief for The Washington Post said that "as far as can be determined from the available evidence, no one died that night in Tiananmen Square". He goes on to conclude: A few people may have been killed by random shooting on streets near the square, but all verified eyewitness accounts say that the students who remained in the square when troops arrived were allowed to leave peacefully. Hundreds of people, most of them workers and passersby, did die that night, but in a different place and under other circumstances.) and CBS correspondent Richard Roth (Note: Richard Roth reported that he was held captive by troops in the Great Hall of the People on the west side of the square on the night of 3 June and could hear but not see into the square until dawn when they were driven through the square. He heard a "volley of gunfire" to silence the students' loudspeakers. He added that there is no doubt that many people were killed in the area on the way to and around the square, mostly in western Beijing, which the Communist Party denies.) reported that while they had heard sporadic gunfire, they could not find enough evidence to suggest that a massacre took place on the square.

Student leader Chai Ling claimed in a speech broadcast on Hong Kong television that she witnessed tanks arrive at the square and crush students who were sleeping in their tents, and added that between 200 and 400 students died at the square. Ling was joined by fellow student leader Wu'er Kaixi who said he had witnessed 200 students being cut down by gunfire; however, according to Mathews, it was later proven that he had already left the square several hours before the events he claimed to have happened. Taiwan-born Hou Dejian was present in the square to show solidarity with the students and said that he did not see any massacre occurring in the square. He was quoted by Xiaoping Li, a former China dissident to have stated: "Some people said 200 died in the square, and others claimed that as many as 2,000 died. There were also stories of tanks running over students who were trying to leave. I have to say I did not see any of that. I was in the square until 6:30 in the morning."

In 2009, human rights activist Robin Munro, stated that he was present during the clearance of Tiananmen Square and that, according to his account, there were ten Western reporters near the Monument to the People's Heroes at the time. He also reported a Spanish television crew that recorded footage of the event. Munro disputed Wu'er Kaixi's claims of mass killings inside the square, stating that he did not witness fighting there and instead observed students peacefully complying with the soldiers' demands to leave the square in an orderly manner. He further noted that the Spanish TV crew reported not seeing killings within the square during the final clearance.

In 2011, three secret cables from the United States embassy in Beijing from the time of the events were leaked and published by WikiLeaks, all of which stated that there was no bloodshed inside Tiananmen Square itself. Instead, they said Chinese soldiers opened fire on protesters in Beijing outside the square, around Muxidi station, as they fought their way from the west towards the centre. A Chilean diplomat who had been positioned next to a Red Cross station inside the square told his US counterparts that he did not observe any mass firing of weapons into the crowds in the square itself, although sporadic gunfire was heard. He said that most of the troops who entered the square were armed only with anti-riot gear.

== Immediate aftermath ==
=== Arrests, punishments, and evacuations ===
On 13 June 1989, the Beijing Public Security Bureau released an order for the arrest of 21 students they identified as the protest leaders. These 21 most-wanted student leaders were part of the Beijing Students Autonomous Federation, which had been instrumental in the Tiananmen Square protests. Though decades have passed, this most-wanted list has never been retracted by the Chinese government.

On 17 June, two individuals were captured after exchanging gunfire with soldiers. The same day, a woman who had been visiting a Western diplomat at Jianguomenwai diplomatic compound was observed being arrested by plainclothes policemen.

The 21 most-wanted student leaders' faces and descriptions were often broadcast on television. Photographs with biographies of the leaders followed in this order: Wang Dan, Wuer Kaixi, Liu Gang, Chai Ling, Zhou Fengsuo, Zhai Weimin, Liang Qingdun, Wang Zhengyun, Zheng Xuguang, Ma Shaofang, Yang Tao, Wang Zhixing, Feng Congde, Wang Chaohua, Wang Youcai, Zhang Zhiqing, Zhang Boli, Li Lu, Zhang Ming, Xiong Wei, and Xiong Yan.

Each of the 21 students faced diverse experiences after their arrests or escapes; while some remain abroad with no intent to return, others have chosen to stay indefinitely, such as Zhang Ming. Only 7 of the 21 were able to escape. Some student leaders, such as Chai Ling and Wuer Kaixi, were able to escape to the United States, the United Kingdom, France, and other Western nations under Operation Yellowbird, which was organised by Western intelligence agencies such as MI6 and CIA from Hong Kong, a British territory at the time. According to The Washington Post, the operation involved more than 40 people and had its roots in the Alliance in Support of Democratic Movements in China formed in May 1989. After the Beijing protest crackdown, this group drew up an initial list of 40 dissidents they believed could form the nucleus of a "Chinese democracy movement in exile".

The remaining student leaders were apprehended and incarcerated. Those who escaped, whether in 1989 or after, generally have had difficulty re-entering China up to this day. The Chinese government has preferred to leave the dissidents in exile. Those who attempt to re-enter, such as Wu'er Kaixi, have been simply sent back but not arrested.

Chen Ziming and Wang Juntao were arrested in late 1989 for their involvement in the protests. Chinese authorities alleged they were the "black hands" behind the movement. Both Chen and Wang rejected the allegations made against them. They were put on trial in 1990 and sentenced to 13 years in prison. Others, such as Zhang Zhiqing, have essentially disappeared. After his initial arrest in January 1991 and subsequent release, nothing further is known about his situation and where he lives now. Zhang Zhiqing's role and reason for being listed on the 21 most wanted is generally unknown; this is the case for many others on the list, such as Wang Chaohua.

According to the Dui Hua Foundation, citing a provincial government, 1,602 individuals were imprisoned for protest-related activities in early 1989. As of May 2012, at least two remain incarcerated in Beijing, and five others remain unaccounted for. In June 2014, it was reported that Miao Deshun was believed to be the last known prisoner incarcerated for their participation in the protests; he was last heard from a decade ago. All are reported to have mental illnesses.

=== Leadership changes ===
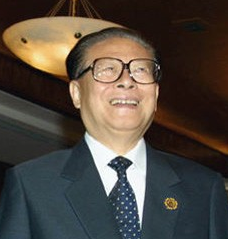
Jiang Zemin (1926–2022), the party secretary of Shanghai, where student protests were subdued largely without violence, was promoted to succeed Zhao Ziyang as the party General Secretary in 1989.

The party leadership expelled Zhao Ziyang from the Politburo Standing Committee (PSC). Hu Qili, another PSC member who opposed martial law but abstained from voting, was also removed from the committee. However, he was able to retain his party membership, and after "changing his opinion", he was reassigned as deputy minister in the Ministry for Machinery and Electronics Industry. Another reform-minded Chinese leader, Wan Li, was also put under house arrest immediately after he stepped out of his plane at Beijing Capital Airport upon returning from a shortened trip abroad; the authorities declared his detention to be on health grounds. When Wan Li was released from his house arrest after he finally "changed his opinion", he, like Qiao Shi, was transferred to a different position with equal rank but a mostly ceremonial role. Several Chinese ambassadors abroad claimed political asylum.

Jiang Zemin, the Party Secretary of Shanghai, was promoted to General Secretary of the Communist Party. Jiang's decisive actions in Shanghai involving the World Economic Herald and his having prevented deadly violence in the city won him support from party elders in Beijing. Having put the new leadership team in place and recognizing his weakened position, Deng Xiaoping himself also bowed out of the party leadership—at least officially—by resigning his last leadership position as Chairman of the Central Military Commission later that year. He kept a low profile until 1992. According to diplomatic cables de-classified by Canada, the Swiss ambassador informed Canadian diplomats in confidence that over several months following the massacre, "every member of the Politburo Standing Committee has approached him about transferring very significant amounts of money to Swiss bank accounts."

Bao Tong, Zhao Ziyang's aide, was the highest-ranking official to be formally charged with a crime connected with 1989 demonstrations. He was convicted in 1992 of "revealing state secrets and counter-revolutionary propagandizing" and served seven years in prison. To purge sympathizers of Tiananmen demonstrators from among the party's rank-and-file, the party leadership initiated a one-and-a-half-year-long rectification programme to "deal strictly with those inside the party with serious tendencies toward bourgeois liberalisation". Four million people were reportedly investigated for their role in the protests. More than 30,000 Communist officers were deployed to assess the "political reliability" of more than one million government officials. The authorities arrested tens if not hundreds of thousands of people across the country. Some were seized in broad daylight while they walked in the street; others were arrested at night. Many were jailed or sent to labour camps. They were often denied access to see their families and often put in cells so crowded that not everyone had space to sleep. Dissidents shared cells with murderers and rapists, and torture was not uncommon.

=== Media coverage ===
==== Official narrative ====
The official narrative constructed by the Chinese Communist Party on 4 June Incident states that the use of force was necessary to control "political turmoil", and this also ensures the stable society that is necessary for successful economic development. Chinese leaders—including Jiang Zemin and Hu Jintao, who were general secretaries of the Central Committee of the Chinese Communist Party—consistently reiterated the official narrative of the Chinese Communist Party when being asked about the protests by foreign journalists.

Print media were required to be consistent with the Chinese government's account of the 4 June Incident. The Chinese government prepared a white paper to explain the government's views on the protests. Later, anonymous people within the Chinese government shipped the files overseas and published the "Tiananmen Papers" in 2001. At the 30th anniversary of the 4 June Incident, Wei Fenghe, a general of the Chinese People's Liberation Army, said in the Shangri-La Dialogue: "The 4 June Incident was a turmoil and unrest. The Central Government took decisive measures to calm the unrest and stop the turmoil, and it is because of this decision that the stability within the country can be established. For the past three decades, China has undergone tremendous changes under the leadership of the Communist Party."

==== Chinese media ====
The suppression of 4 June marked the end of a period of relative press freedom in China, and media workers—both foreign and domestic—faced heightened restrictions and punishment in the aftermath of the crackdown. State media reports in the immediate aftermath were sympathetic to the students. As a result, those responsible were all later removed from their posts. Two news anchors, Du Xian and Xue Fei, who reported this event on 4 and 5 June, respectively in the daily Xinwen Lianbo broadcast on China Central Television, were fired because they openly emoted in sympathy with the protesters. Wu Xiaoyong, the son of the former foreign minister Wu Xueqian, was removed from the English Programme Department of Chinese Radio International, ostensibly for his sympathies towards protesters. Editors and other staff at the People's Daily, including director Qian Liren and Editor-in-Chief Tan Wenrui, were also sacked because of reports in the paper that were sympathetic towards the protesters.

The restrictions were loosened after a few years had passed, especially after Deng Xiaoping's southern tour. Privately run print media then again flourished. Private newspapers increased from 250 in the 1980s to over 7,000 by 2003. Provincially-run, satellite TV stations sprang up all over the country and challenged the market share of state-run CCTV. The leadership also stepped away from promoting communism as an all-encompassing belief system. State-approved religious organisations increased their membership significantly, and traditional beliefs suppressed during the Mao era re-appeared. This state-sanctioned plurality also created an environment for unsanctioned forms of spirituality and worship to grow. To reduce the need for controversial methods of state control, Protestants, Buddhists, and Taoists were often used by the state as "approved" denominations to "fight against cults" such as Falun Gong, playing the sects against each other.

==== Foreign media ====
With the imposition of martial law, the Chinese government cut off Western broadcasters' satellite transmissions such as CNN and CBS. Broadcasters tried to defy these orders by reporting via telephone. Video footage was smuggled out of the country, although the only network that was able to record video during the night of 4 June was Televisión Española of Spain (TVE). During the military action, some foreign journalists faced harassment from authorities. CBS correspondent Richard Roth and his cameraman were taken into custody while filing a report from the square via mobile phone.

Several foreign journalists who had covered the crackdown were expelled in the weeks that followed, while others were harassed by authorities or blacklisted from reentering the country. Some were reportedly beaten.

Some Western outlets withheld certain images from viewers; Graham Earnshaw, a Reuters correspondent at the time, stated that a "disgusting" photo depicting the burned body of a soldier hanging from a bus was not sent to subscribers.

== Reactions ==
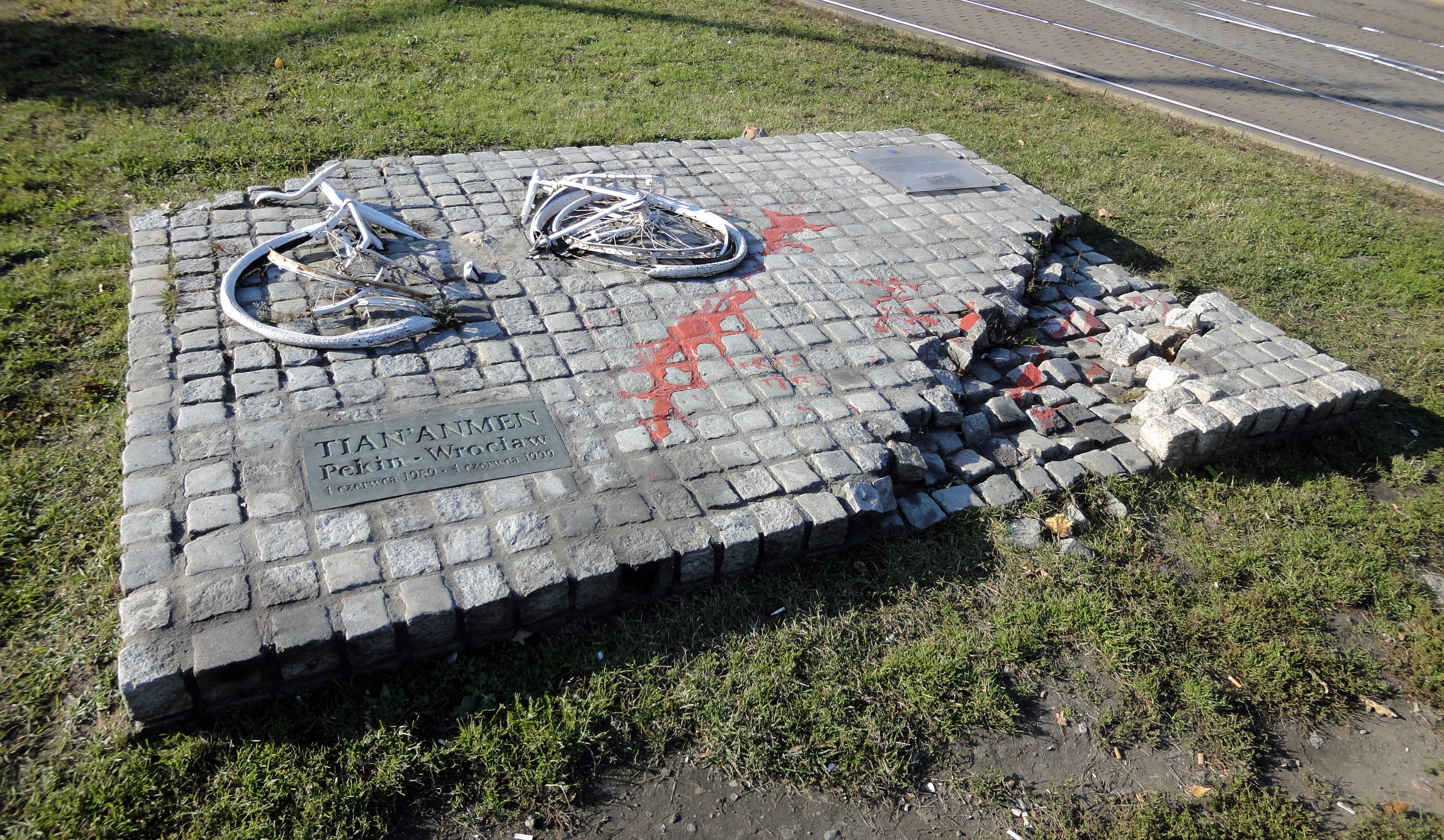
Monument in Memory of Chinese from Tiananmen in Wrocław, Poland

The Chinese government's response was widely denounced by Western governments and media.

According to Suisheng Zhao, Asian countries generally remained silent throughout the protests. India's government under Prime Minister Rajiv Gandhi ordered state television to minimize coverage of the events in Beijing so as not to jeopardize a thawing in relations with China and to empathize with the Chinese government. The Communist Party of India (Marxist) was the only political party in the world to pass a resolution supporting the crackdown on the Tiananmen Square protests, calling them "an imperialist attempt to internally subvert socialism, [which] was successfully thwarted by the CPC and the PLA." South Korea was in the midst of efforts to develop relations with the People's Republic of China and President Roh Tae-woo remained quiet in the aftermath of the crackdown.

Former United Nations Secretary-General Javier Pérez de Cuéllar expressed great sadness over the event. In 1992, he however stated that the crackdown had been exaggerated, and that he received no convincing evidence of widespread killing.

Cuba, Czechoslovakia, and East Germany, under the Soviet sphere of influence at the time, supported the Chinese government and denounced the protests.

Amnesty International condemned the prosecution of Hong Kong activists Chow Hang-tung and Lee Cheuk-yan, arguing that it is part of a broader strategy to use national security laws to suppress dissent and erase historical memory of the 1989 Tiananmen Square crackdown. Both activists, former members of the disbanded Hong Kong Alliance, have been detained for over four years and face lengthy imprisonment for advocating justice for the victims. Amnesty calls for their immediate release, the repeal of the National Security Law, and the protection of the right to peacefully commemorate the Tiananmen massacre.

== Longer-term impact ==
=== Politics ===
As the CCP departed from the orthodox communism it was founded upon, much of its attention was focused on the cultivation of nationalism as an alternative ideology. This policy largely succeeded in tying the party's legitimacy to China's "national pride", turning domestic public opinion back in its favour.

Support of liberal reform and liberal democracy among intellectuals decreased, and support for conservative cultural politics increased.

The protests highlighted severe inadequacies in riot-control equipment and training among both the Chinese military and police. The PLA was not trained or equipped to handle riots, and the few PAP riot-control units that were dispatched were insufficient in crowd control. Since 1989, efforts have been made to create effective riot-control units in Chinese cities increased spending on internal security and to an expanded role for the People's Armed Police in handling protests.

=== Economy ===
After the protests and massacre, many business analysts downgraded their outlook for China's economic future. The violent response to the protests was one of the factors that led to a delay in China's acceptance in the World Trade Organization, which was not completed until twelve years later, in 2001. Furthermore, bilateral aid to China decreased from $3.4 billion in 1988 to $700 million in 1990. Loans to China were suspended by the World Bank, Asian Development Bank, and foreign governments; China's credit rating was lowered; tourism revenue decreased from US$2.2 billion to US$1.8 billion; and foreign direct investment commitments were cancelled. However, there was a rise in government defence spending from 8.6% in 1986, to 15.5% in 1990, reversing a previous 10-year decline.

Following the protests and massacre, the state paused various marketization reforms or rolled them back in some policy areas. The government sought again to centralize control over the economy, though the changes were short-lived. Sensing that conservative policies had again taken a foothold within the party, Deng, now retired from all of his official positions, launched his southern tour in 1992, visiting various cities in the country's most prosperous regions while advocating for further economic reforms. Partly in response to Deng, by the mid-1990s the country was again pursuing market liberalisation on a scale even greater than those seen in the initial stages of the reforms in the 1980s. Although political liberals were purged from within the party, many of those who were economically liberal remained. The economic shocks caused by the events of 1989, in retrospect, had only a minor and temporary effect on China's economic growth. Indeed, with many previously aggrieved groups now regarding political liberalisation as a lost cause, more of their energy was spent on economic activities. The economy would quickly regain momentum into the 1990s.

=== Hong Kong ===
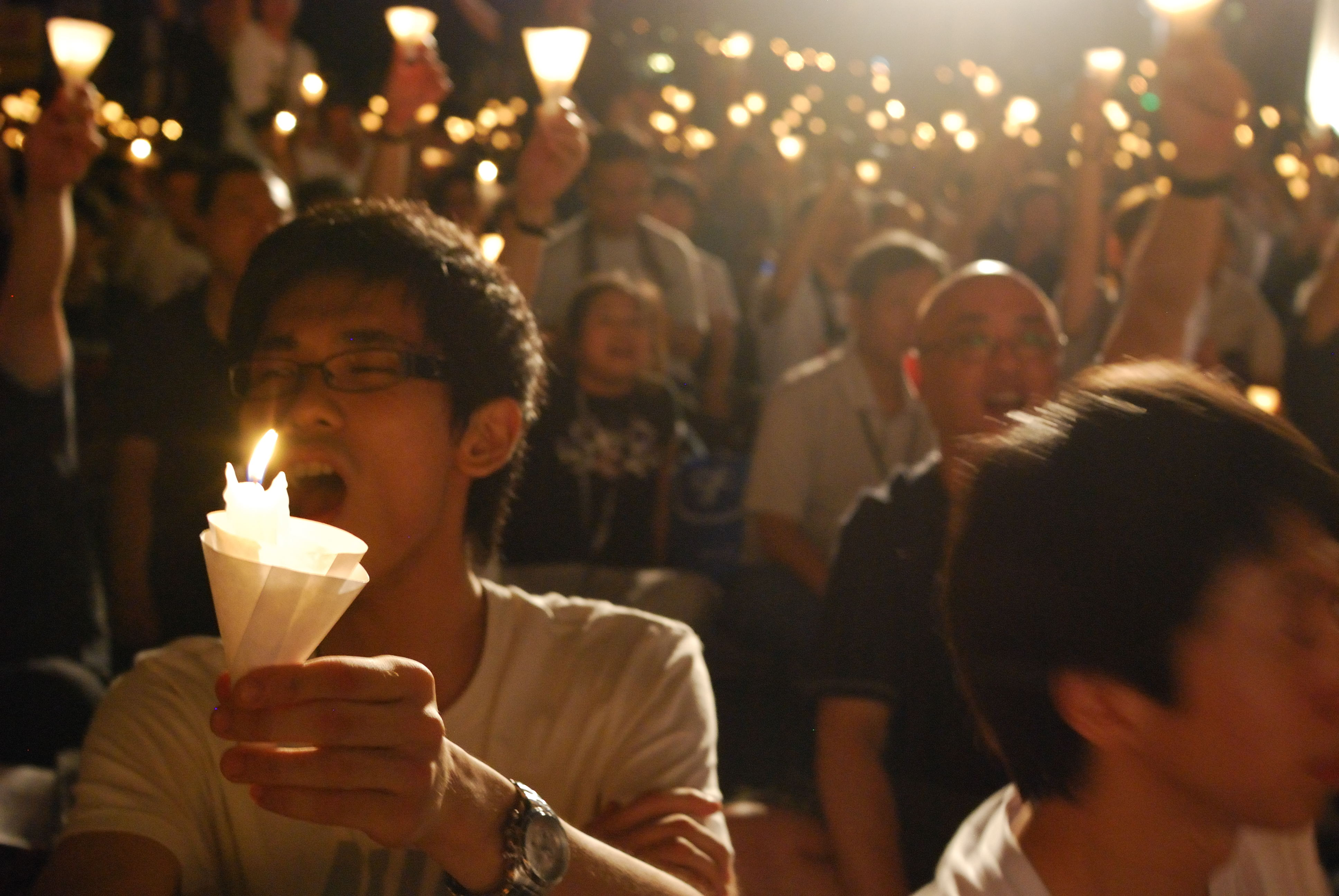
Candlelight vigil in Hong Kong in 2009 on the 20th anniversary of the June 4 incident

In Hong Kong, the Tiananmen Square protests led to fears that China would renege on its commitments under one country, two systems, following the impending handover of Hong Kong from the United Kingdom in 1997. In response, Governor Chris Patten tried to expand the franchise for the Legislative Council of Hong Kong, which led to friction with Beijing. For many Hongkongers, Tiananmen served as the turning point when they lost trust in the Beijing government. The event, coupled with general uncertainty about the status of Hong Kong after the transfer of sovereignty, led to a sizable exodus of Hong Kongers to Western countries such as Canada and Australia before 1997.

There have been large candlelight vigils attended by tens of thousands in Hong Kong every year since 1989, even after the transfer of power to China in 1997. Despite that, the June 4th Museum closed in July 2016, after only two years in its location. The group that runs the museum, the Hong Kong Alliance, has started to crowdfund money to open the museum in a new location. A virtual version of the museum released online in August 2021 has also been blocked by Chinese telecom companies.

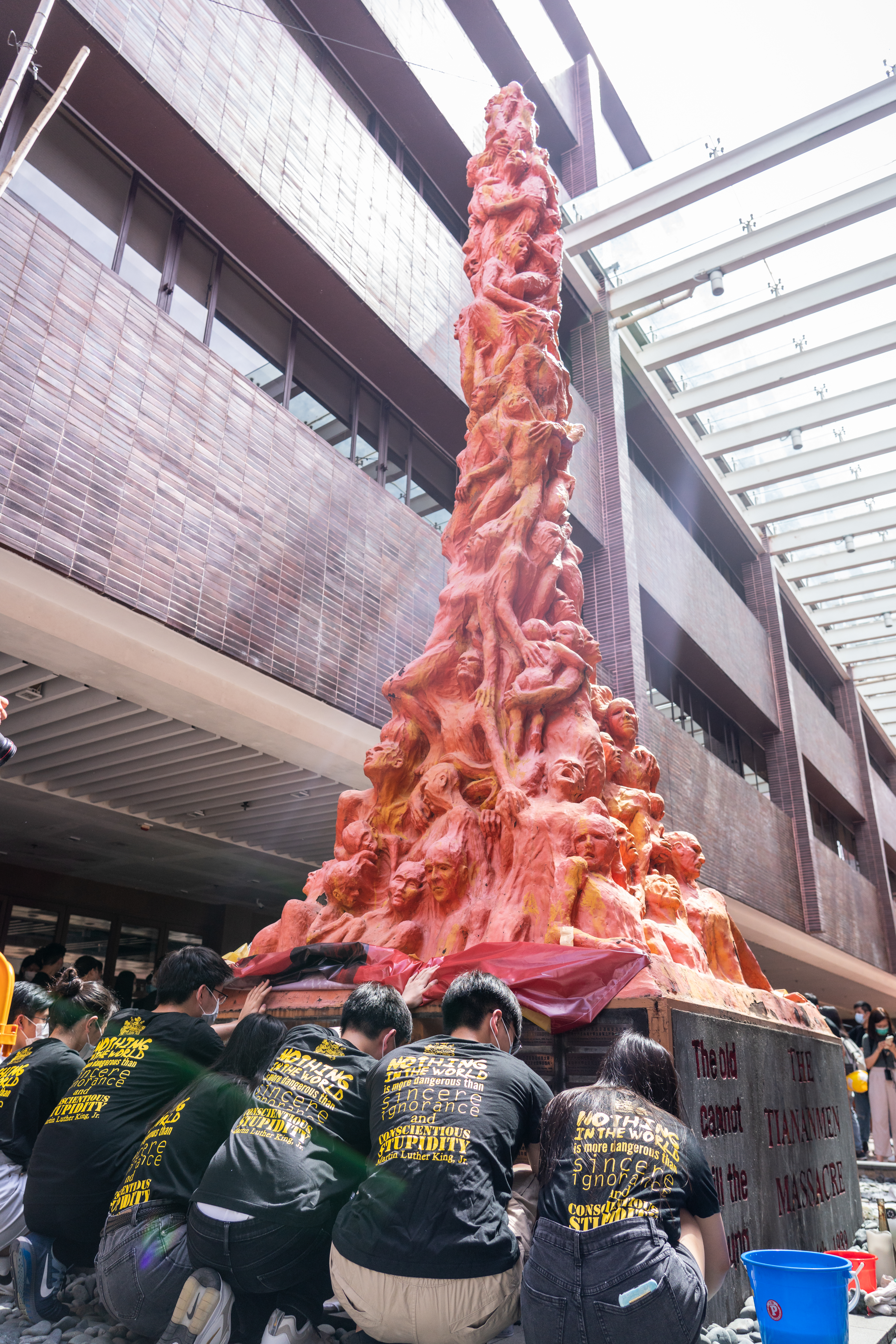
Pillar of Shame in the University of Hong Kong in 2020

The events continue to strongly impact perceptions of China, its government, attitudes towards democracy, and the extent to which Hong Kongers should identify as "Chinese". The events of 4 June are seen as representative of the Chinese brand of authoritarianism, and they are often invoked by pro-democracy politicians in Hong Kong, especially in relation to democratic reform in Hong Kong and the territory's relationship with Beijing. Academic studies indicate that those who supported the Tiananmen Square movement's rehabilitation had a tendency to support democratisation in the territory and the election of pro-democracy parties.

In memory of the events among other monuments at 1997 Pillar of Shame with height of 8 metres (26 ft) performed by sculptor Jens Galschiøt was placed in the University of Hong Kong. On 22 December 2021, it was removed by the university authorities, a move that was condemned by Wang Dan.

=== China's image internationally ===
The Chinese government drew widespread condemnation for its suppression of the protests. In the immediate aftermath, China seemed to be becoming a pariah state, increasingly isolated internationally. This was a significant setback for the leadership, who had courted international investment for much of the 1980s, as the country emerged from the chaos of the Cultural Revolution; however, Deng Xiaoping and the core leadership vowed to continue economic liberalisation policies after 1989. From there on, China would work domestically and internationally to reshape its national image from that of a repressive regime to that of a benign global economic and military partner.

Although the crackdown hurt relations with Western countries, it had relatively little impact on China's relations with its Asian neighbours. Professor Suisheng Zhao, Director of the Centre for China-US Cooperation at the University of Denver, attributes the slight impact to the fact that "the human rights records in most of these countries were not better than China's. To a certain extent, they were sympathetic to China's struggle against pressures from Western countries." Even in the wake of the crackdown, China's foreign relations with its neighbours generally improved.

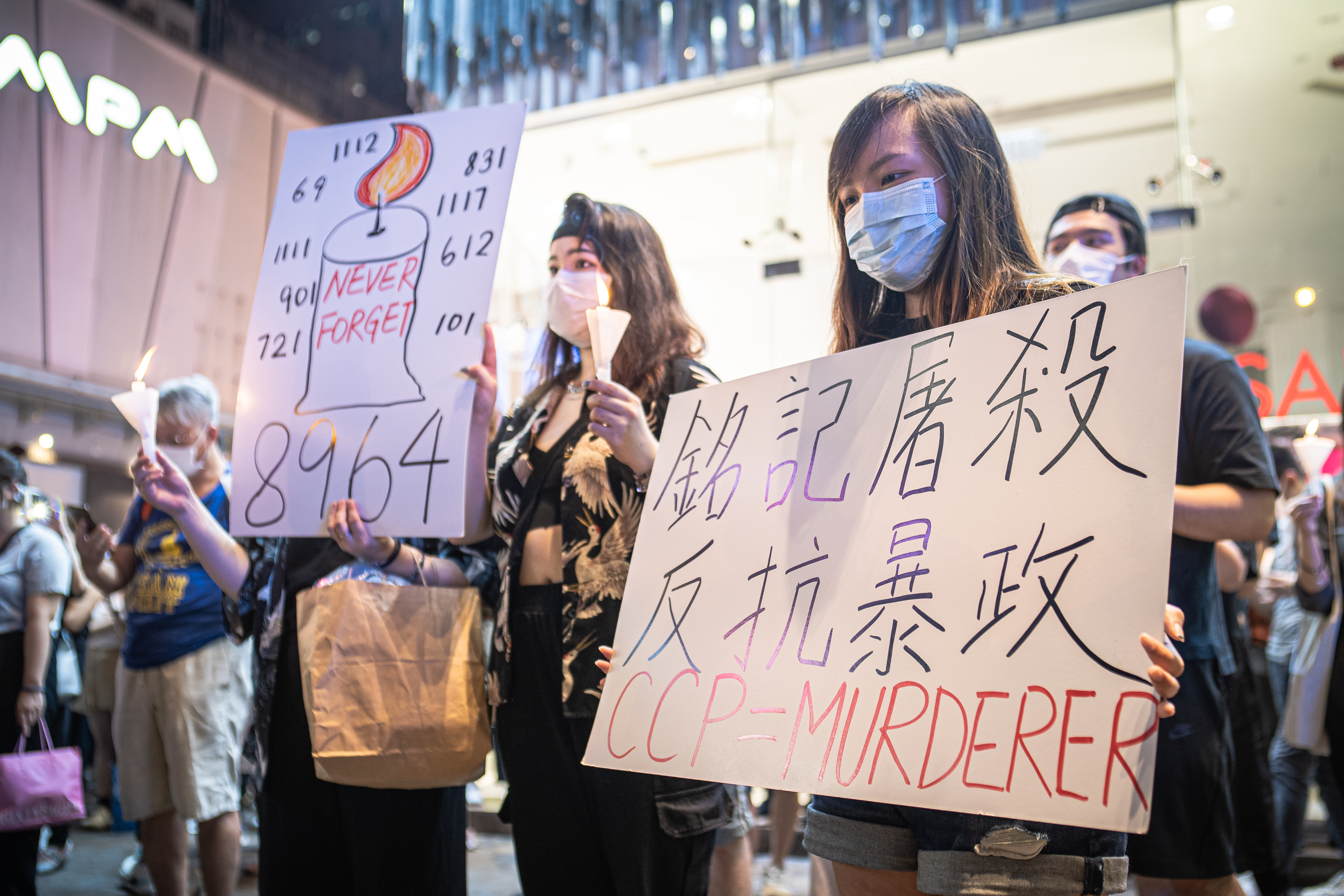
Protest in Hong Kong, 2020

The government signed the Non-Proliferation Treaty in 1992, the Convention on Chemical Weapons in 1993, and the Comprehensive Test Ban Treaty in 1996. Whereas China had been a member of only 30 international organisations in 1986, it was a member of over 50 by 1997. China also sought to diversify its external partnerships, establishing good diplomatic relations with post-Soviet Russia, and welcoming Taiwanese business in lieu of Western investment. China expedited negotiations with the World Trade Organisation and established relations with Indonesia, Israel, South Korea, and others in 1992.

Furthermore, the government has successfully promoted China as an attractive destination for investment by emphasizing its skilled workers, comparatively low wages, established infrastructure, and sizable consumer base. At the same time, the explosion of commercial interest in the country opened the way for multinational corporations to turn a blind eye to politics and human rights in favour of focusing on business interests. Since then, Western leaders who were previously critical of China have sometimes paid lip service to the legacy of Tiananmen in bilateral meetings, but the substance of discussions revolved around business and trade interests.

=== European Union and the United States arms embargo ===
The European Union and United States embargo on armament sales to China, put in place due to the violent suppression of the Tiananmen Square protests, remains in place today. China has been calling for a lift of the ban for years and has had a varying amount of support from European Union members. Since 2004, China has portrayed the ban as "outdated" and damaging to China–European Union relations. In early 2004, French President Jacques Chirac spearheaded a movement within the European Union to lift the ban, his efforts being supported by German Chancellor Gerhard Schröder. However, the passing of the Anti-Secession Law of the People's Republic of China, in March 2005, increased tensions between mainland China and Taiwan, damaging attempts to lift the ban; and several European Union Council members retracted their support for a lift of the ban. Moreover, Schröder's successor Angela Merkel opposed lifting the ban. Members of the United States Congress had also proposed restrictions on the transfer of military technology to the European Union if the latter lifted the ban. The United Kingdom also opposed the embargo lifting when it took charge of the European Union presidency in July 2005.

The European Parliament has consistently opposed the lifting of the arms embargo to China. Though its agreement is not necessary for lifting the ban, many argue it reflects the will of the European people better as it is the only directly elected European body. The arms embargo has limited China's options in seeking military hardware. Among the sources that were sought included the former Soviet bloc that it had a strained relationship with as a result of the Sino-Soviet split. Other willing suppliers have previously included Israel and South Africa, but American pressure has restricted this co-operation.

=== Chinese disapora ===
Post-Tiananmen immigration responses in several countries contributed to increased long-term settlement of Chinese nationals already abroad. Following the protests and crackdown, a number of countries including European countries and the United States authorized shortcut avenues for Chinese nationals to get permanent resident status, affecting tens of thousands of people.

In the United States on 6th June, 1989, President George H. W. Bush stated that he ordered protections for Chinese nationals with Executive order 12711, which suspended deportations for Chinese nationals already in the country. The U.S. government later gave them authorization to work legally in the country. Three years later, the Chinese Student Protection Act (1992) was enacted that enabled around 54,000 Chinese nationals to gain permanent residency in the United States. A 2012 study published in the International Migration Review, found that Chinese migrants who had received legal work status and green cards due to the post-Tiananmen policies, performed significantly better in employment and earnings during the 1990s than comparable Asian immigrant groups who did not receive such protections.

On June 9, 1989, the Australian prime minister Bob Hawke made an infamous televised address where he told the public that soldiers had charged into Tiananmen Square, shooting and bayoneting protesters and that they "had orders that nobody in the square be spared, and children and young girls were slaughtered". Although the retelling of events at the square was later found to be inaccurate, Hawke shed tears during his speech and announced that he would offer asylum to approximately 42,000 Chinese nationals already in Australia as a direct consequence. Hawke in 2015, told The Guardian that he acted unilaterally and did not consult anyone on his decision and had a "deep love for the Chinese people".

In 1990, Chinese immigration to Vancouver had doubled and in 1994 alone, the city welcomed in 43,000 Chinese immigrants. According to Legion magazine, the new demographic was largely professional and educated people.

== Contemporary issues ==
=== Censorship in China ===
The Chinese Communist Party initially responded with a propaganda campaign. The CCP's top leadership decided not to hold a celebration on the one-year anniversary on 4 June 1990. The last 4 June related state publication was published in 1991. Since then, the CCP has imposed a near-total blackout on the events, with even previously government-produced documentaries on the events being banned.

The Chinese government forbids discussions about the Tiananmen Square protests and has taken measures to block or censor related information, in an attempt to suppress the public's memory of the protests. Textbooks contain little, if any, information about the protests. After the protests, officials banned controversial films and books and shut down many newspapers. Within a year, 12% of all newspapers, 8% of all publishing companies, 13% of all social science periodicals, and more than 150 films were either banned or shut down. The government also announced that it had seized 32 million contraband books and 2.4 million video and audio cassettes. Access to media and Internet resources about the subject are either restricted or blocked by censors. Banned literature and films include Summer Palace, Forbidden City, The Critical Moment: Li Peng Diaries and any writings of Zhao Ziyang or his aide Bao Tong, including Zhao's memoirs. The CCP forbids discussing the events even from a pro-government perspective; Flying the Flag of the Republic, a documentary produced by the PLA after the events that recounts the events from the perspective of the CCP, was eventually banned due to its mentioning of the events, while mentions of the Guardian of the Capital, awarded to troops who took part in the PLA response, is forbidden from the Chinese internet. Due to the extensive censorship around the events, most young people in China are unaware of the Tiananmen Square protests and massacre.

Print media that contain references to the protests must be consistent with the government's version of events. Domestic and foreign journalists are detained, harassed, or threatened, as are their Chinese colleagues and any Chinese citizens who they interview. Thus, Chinese citizens are typically reluctant to speak about the protests because of potentially negative repercussions. Many young people who were born after 1980 are unfamiliar with the events and are therefore apathetic about politics. Youth in China are generally unaware of the events, the symbols which are associated with them such as the Tank Man, or the significance of the date of the massacre 4 June itself. Some older intellectuals no longer aspire to implement political change. Instead, they focus on economic issues. Some political prisoners have refused to talk to their children about their involvement in the protests out of fear of putting them at risk.

While public discussions about the events have become socially taboo, private discussions about them continue to occur despite frequent interference and harassment by the authorities. Nobel Peace Prize laureate Liu Xiaobo remained in China in order to speak out about Tiananmen in the 1990s despite the fact that he received offers of asylum; he faced constant surveillance. Zhang Xianling and Ding Zilin, the mothers of victims who died in 1989, founded the Tiananmen Mothers organisation and were particularly outspoken about the humanitarian aspects of the protests. The authorities mobilize security forces, including members of the People's Armed Police, every year on 4 June in order to prevent public displays of remembrance, with an especially heavy security presence on the anniversaries of major events such as the 20th anniversary of the protests in 2009 and the 25th anniversary of the protests in 2014. On the 30th anniversary of the protests in 2019, the well-known Chinese artist Ai Weiwei wrote that "autocratic and totalitarian regimes fear facts because they have built their power on unjust foundations" and he also wrote that memory is important: "without it there is no such thing as a civilised society or nation" because "our past is all we have."

Journalists have frequently been denied entry to the square on the anniversaries of the massacre. Also, the authorities are known to have detained foreign journalists and increase surveillance of prominent human rights activists during this time of year. Internet searches on "4 June Tiananmen Square" made within China return censored results or result in temporarily severed server connections. Specific web pages with select keywords are censored while other websites, such as those which support the overseas Chinese democracy movement, are blocked wholesale. The policy is much more stringent with regard to Chinese-language sites than it is with regard to foreign-language ones. Social media censorship is more stringent in the weeks leading up to the anniversaries of the massacre; even oblique references to the protests and seemingly unrelated terms are usually very aggressively patrolled and censored. In January 2006, Google agreed to censor their mainland China site to remove information about Tiananmen and other subjects which are considered sensitive by the authorities. Google withdrew its cooperation on censorship in January 2010.

In August 2026, Le Monde published previously unseen footage recorded in 1989 by Nathalie Trouveroy, who said the material was released to help preserve the memory of the victims of the repression. Earlier, in June, more than 2,000 previously unseen photographs of the protests and crackdown, taken by a Chinese state-media photographer and entrusted to The Epoch Times, were publicly released for the first time.

=== Calls for the government to reassess ===
Zhang Shijun, a former soldier who was involved in the military crackdown, published an open letter to President Hu Jintao that sought to have the government reevaluate its position on the protests. He was subsequently arrested.

Although the Chinese government never officially acknowledged relevant accusations when it came to the incident, in 2005 a payment was made to one of the victims' mothers, the first publicised case of the government offering redress to a Tiananmen-related victim's family. The payment was termed a "hardship assistance" and was given to Tang Deying (唐德英), whose son Zhou Guocong (simplified Chinese: 周国聪; traditional Chinese: 周國聰) died at age 15 while in police custody in Chengdu on 6 June 1989, two days after the Chinese Army dispersed the Tiananmen protesters. She was reportedly paid CNY70,000 (approximately US$10,250). This has been welcomed by various Chinese activists.

=== Chinese leaders voicing regret ===
Before his death in 1998, Yang Shangkun told army doctor Jiang Yanyong that 4 June was the most serious mistake committed by the Communist Party in its history, a mistake that Yang himself could not correct, but one that certainly will eventually be corrected. Zhao Ziyang remained under house arrest until his death in 2005. Zhao's aide Bao Tong has repeatedly called on the government to reverse its verdict on the demonstrations. Chen Xitong, the mayor of Beijing, who read the martial law order and was later disgraced by a political scandal, expressed regret in 2012, a year before his death, for the death of innocent civilians. Premier Wen Jiabao reportedly suggested reversing the government's position on Tiananmen in party meetings before he departed from politics in 2013, only to be rebuffed by his colleagues.

=== United Nations report ===
In 2008, the UN Committee Against Torture expressed concern over the lack of investigations into the reports of people "killed, arrested or disappeared on or following the 4 June 1989 Beijing suppression." It stated that the Chinese government had also failed to inform relatives of those individuals' fate, despite relatives' numerous requests. Meanwhile, those responsible for the use of excessive force had not "faced any sanction, administrative or criminal." The Committee recommended that the Chinese government should take all of those steps, plus "offer apologies and reparation as appropriate and prosecute those found responsible for excessive use of force, torture and other ill-treatment."

In December 2009, the Chinese government responded to the committee's recommendations by saying that the government had closed the case concerning the "political turmoil in the spring and summer of 1989". It also stated that the "practice of the past 20 years has made it clear that the timely and decisive measures taken by the Chinese Government at the time were necessary and correct". It said that the labelling of the "incident as 'the Democracy Movement'" is a "distortion in the nature of the incident". According to the Chinese government, such observations were "inconsistent with the Committee's responsibilities".

=== Software and IT remembrance ===
Many Chinese origin techies continue to remember and commemorate Tiananmen event in their own field from time to time. For example, Notepad++ developer Don Ho released a commemorative version called "Notepad++ v8.9 . 6.4 Tiananmen Massacre Commemoration".

== See also ==
- Bibliographies of the People's Republic of China
- Bibliography of the 1989 Tiananmen Square protests and massacre (1989)
- 1981 Inner Mongolia student protest – Student-led protest against cultural and political policies
- 1987–1989 Tibetan unrest – Series of pro-independence protests and demonstrations in Tibet, China
- Chinese Student Protection Act of 1992 – US law easing residency for Chinese students
- December 9th Movement – 1935 student protest against Japanese aggression in Beijing, Republic-era China
- Democracy in China
- Human rights in China
- List of massacres in China
- Mass incidents in China – Government term for large-scale protests
- Mass killings under communist regimes
- Mass surveillance in China
- Moving the Mountain (1994 film)
- Protest and dissent in China
- Student propaganda during the 1989 Tiananmen Square protests and massacre
