= Foreign media at the 1989 Tiananmen Square protests and massacre =

Non-Chinese media presence

Foreign media institutions and correspondents were present for much of the 1989 Tiananmen Square protests and massacre. They included correspondents from the British Broadcasting Corporation (BBC), Voice of America (VOA), Cable News Network (CNN), Columbia Broadcasting System (CBS), American Broadcasting Company (ABC), and the National Broadcasting Company (NBC). Others included correspondents from then British-controlled Hong Kong and Taiwan. Many of the correspondents were in China to report on the visit of Mikhail Gorbachev or were covering the Asian Development Bank meeting that was happening in Beijing. Foreign media coverage of the protests became a popular source for news after martial law was declared on May 20 and the government "imposed strict control over the Chinese media".

== Prior to martial law ==
Broadcasts from the VOA and BBC had been popular sources of information, both local and world-wide, for Chinese residents for some time. Their broadcasts covered news that Chinese media did not report. Occasionally, the VOA and BBC were "jammed with noise" but after 1978-1979 the jamming ended making listening to the news much more consistent. From April 16 to May 16, 1989, the VOA broadcast's coverage of the Tiananmen movement averaged approximately 17% of its Mandarin newscast but grew to 20% between May 4 and May 15. This coverage increased quickly as martial law was announced and around June 4 it grew from 70% to more than 80%. In response to the growing pro-democracy movement, the VOA, which provides news in both Mandarin and English, expanded its regular eight hours per day of Mandarin content to eleven hours each day. For the first time in its history the VOA sent signals to China, which went directly to 2,000 Chinese satellites.

Many notable news anchors arrived to cover the pro-democracy movement. Bernard Shaw of CNN was the first of these newscasters to arrive. Others followed such as Ted Koppel of ABC, Dan Rather of CBS, and Tom Brokaw of NBC. Between May 13–20, the movement became "center stage of world attention" and live broadcasts from China were routine.

Prior to the implementation of martial law, during the May 13–19 period, Chinese media outlets were able to report on the protests with little restriction. Author Nan Lin suggests that local broadcasts were popular with the Chinese citizens for their "immediacy and accuracy". During the period prior to martial law, the Chinese were less dependent on foreign media broadcasts as demonstrated by a rise in newspapers sales and an increase in television and radio audiences. The VOA, among other sources, used official Chinese news media as a listed source of information on 25% of its stories during the protests. After martial law was implemented, the popularity of foreign media outlets resumed.

== Enactment of martial law ==
Foreign media faced many restrictions when covering the Tiananmen protests. After the declaration of martial law, foreign media was no longer permitted to visit Tiananmen Square. Foreign correspondents gave reports from guest rooms in tourist hotels; these became the backdrop for many live broadcasts from American networks. This ban was originally not strictly enforced, but soon security personnel and police spoke to foreign media correspondents and pushed them to leave stating that Gorbachev's visit had ended. Author Nan Lin states that when the journalists were slow in leaving, "forceful actions were taken to block news gathering and transmission". Photography of the Square was also not permitted. Transporting film from Beijing became difficult, often requiring it to be taken apart frame by frame, sent out on ordinary phone lines, and reconstituted elsewhere.

Foreign media faced other difficulties in reporting on the Tiananmen Square protests. As the military entered the square and violence erupted, there was confusion as different outlets were isolated between east and west Beijing. Correspondents faced detention, including numerous Hong Kong correspondents and a CBS correspondent. Journalists were also reportedly beaten. Dan Rather of CBS was confronted by Chinese security personnel during a live broadcast. Even after major television crews left China reports continued to surface via satellite channels.

== Interpretations of the foreign media presence ==
Foreign media and the Chinese government have different perspectives on the influence of foreign correspondents during the protests. Foreign reporters were often looked upon as "sympathetic" towards protesters as they broadcast world-wide "appeals" for the pro-democratic movement Journalist Harrison E. Salisbury described the response of the Chinese government as "xenophobic" towards foreigners and cites the criticism of foreign correspondents during the protests as evidence. As a counterpoint, Salisbury recognizes that the Chinese government believe that the United States media, particularly Dan Rather, "had distorted the picture and not presented the government's side". Salisbury attempts to understand the government perspective, reasoning that they believed "that the United States had a false idea of the nature of the student movements, [and] that American television was to blame [because it] had exaggerated the idealism of the movement".

Jay Matthews of The Washington Post writes in the Columbia Journalism Review that "most of the hundreds of foreign journalists that night, including me, were in other parts of the city or were removed from the square so that they could not witness the final chapter of the student story. Those who tried to remain close filed dramatic accounts that, in some cases, buttressed the myth of a student massacre". He previously held Bureau Chief posts at locations including Beijing, as its first Bureau Chief in 1979–1980, and Los Angeles. He spent several weeks back in Beijing in 1989 to cover the Tiananmen protests at the time, and has since challenged the dominant foreign media narrative of a student massacre inside Tiananmen Square, reporting that all remaining students at the square, were allowed to leave the square peacefully when soldiers arrived, and that instead "hundreds of people, mostly workers and passersby did die that night, but in a different place and under different circumstances".

Author Nan Lin concludes that the protests drew international attention through press, allowing the government to "justify counteractions" while warning the population that China would "be humiliated in the eyes of the world" while the protesters used the attention "to maximize public attention and sympathy" for their movement.

Lin Chun of the London School of Economics writes, "Even in front of the cameras of an intensely manipulative international media (whose numbers jumped when Gorbachev visited China in May), students in a political theatre of 'acting out democracy' did not produce a single anti-socialist slogan."

== Role of Asian media correspondents ==
There were a variety of different correspondents present for the Tiananmen Square Protests, including from then British-controlled Hong Kong and Taiwan. These correspondents were familiar with the politics and proficient in the language; they were able to gather important information and conduct interviews with locals.
