= People's Liberation Army at the 1989 Tiananmen Square protests and massacre =

Role of the Chinese military and martial law

People's Liberation Army at the 1989 Tiananmen Square protests
- Part of the 1989 Tiananmen Square protests
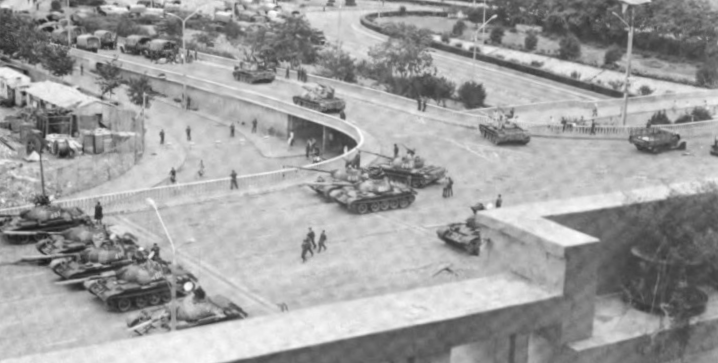
- Chinese tanks in Beijing, June 1989
Date	21 May – 9 June 1989 (20 days)
Location	Beijing, China
Result	Government victory (Note: "China's military warned on the morning news today that the capture of Tiananmen was "just an initial victory" and predicted a long fight against "dregs of society," Reuter reported. "With one exception, China's official media called yesterday's military raid on Tiananmen Square a "glorious" victory" [...]): End of student-led demonstrations, PLA retakes the Tiananmen Square and streets of Beijing

Belligerents
Government of China; Chinese Communist Party; Central Military Commission; People's Liberation Army	Demonstrators: Beijing Students' Autonomous Federation; Beijing Workers' Autonomous Federation; Defend Tiananmen Square Headquarters

Commanders and leaders
(China) Deng Xiaoping (CMC Chairman); (China) Yang Shangkun (President); (China) Li Peng (Premier); (China) Liu Huaqing (CMC deputy Secretary-general); (China) Chi Haotian (Head of the General Staff Department); (China) Yang Baibing (Director of the General Political Department); (China) Xu Qinxian (Commander of the 38th Group Army)	Student leaders: Wang Dan; Wu'erkaixi; Chai Ling; Shen Tong; Liu Gang; Feng Congde; Li Lu; Wang Youcai; Workers: Han Dongfang; Lü Jinghua; Intellectuals: Liu Xiaobo; Wang Juntao; Dai Qing; Hou Dejian; Cui Jian; Zhang Boli; Chen Mingyuan

Strength
150,000–350,000 troops	50,000–100,000 demonstrators

Casualties and losses
23 killed including 10 PLA and 13 PAP (Note: Per Chinese government:); ~5000 wounded 60+ armored personnel carriers 30+ police cars 1,000+ military vehicles 120+ public busses 70+ other vehicles	218 killed (Note: Per Chinese government:) hundreds to ~2,600 killed (Note: Per outside estimates:); 2,000+ wounded

During the 1989 Tiananmen Square protests in Beijing, the People's Liberation Army (PLA) played a decisive role in enforcing martial law, using force to suppress the demonstrations in the city. Within China, the role of the military in 1989 remains a subject of private discussion within the ranks of the party leadership and PLA.

== Deployment during initial stages of protests ==
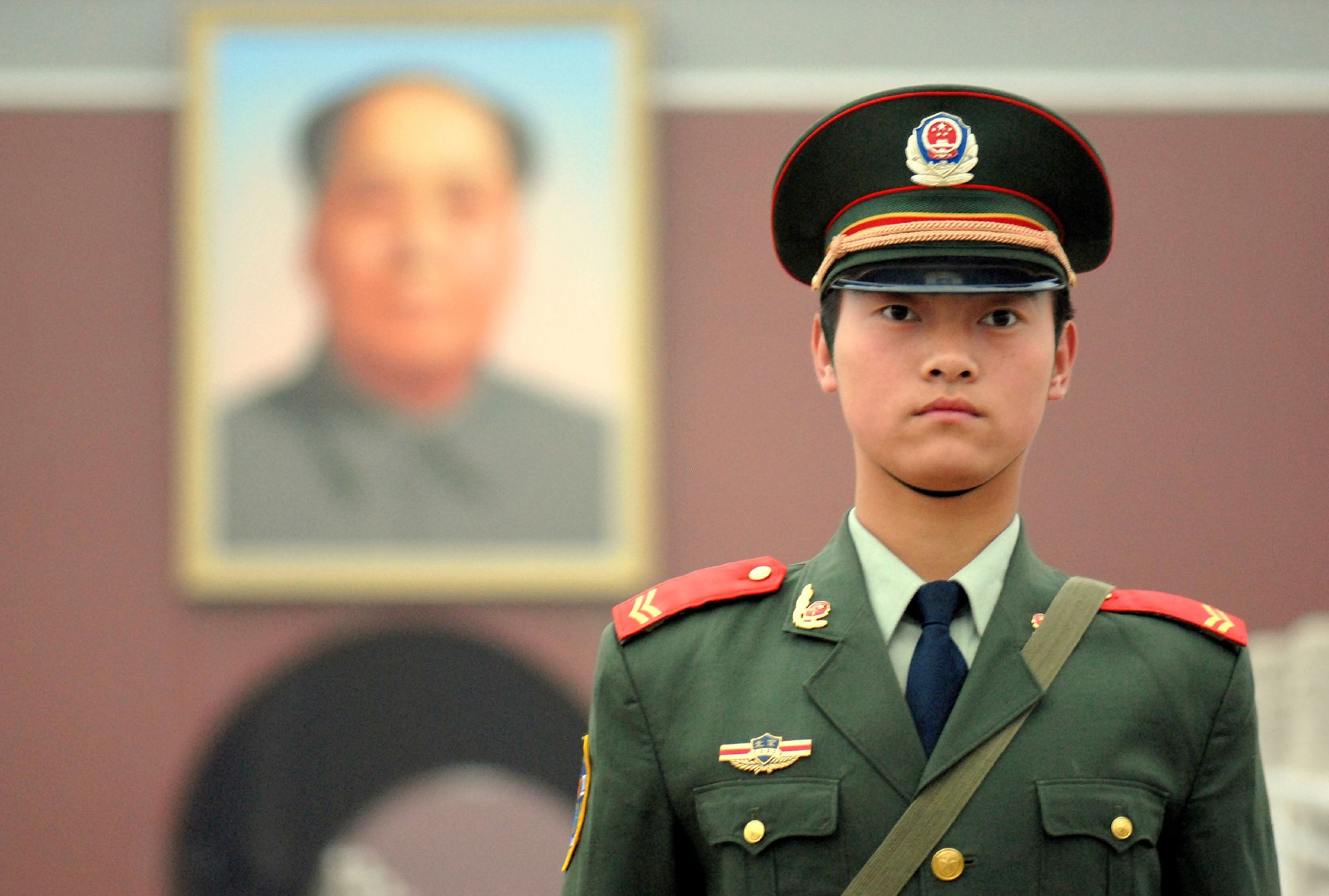
Although People's Liberation Army and People's Armed Police personnel had often been deployed in the center of Beijing for honor guard duty or to provide security back up, the mobilization of over 200,000 troops to impose martial law in May 1989 was unprecedented in the history of the capital.

The student movement in Beijing in the spring of 1989 was triggered by the death of former CCP General Secretary Hu Yaobang on April 15. Well before martial law was declared on May 19, the government called army troops into the city to help the police maintain order. On April 22, the Beijing Garrison's 13th Safeguard Regiment (3rd Guard Division) and nearly 9,000 soldiers from the 38th Army (112th Division, 6th Armored Division, engineer and communications regiments) were deployed around the Great Hall of the People during Hu's funeral. Outside the Hall, in Tiananmen Square, nearly 100,000 students had gathered on the night of April 21 to mourn Hu.

The 38th Army was called into Beijing a second time, after the publication of the April 26 Editorial, to join Beijing Garrison troops in guarding Tiananmen Square against protesting students. Several hundred thousand students marched from campus through the city centre on April 27, but did not enter the square. About 5,100 troops were involved in this second deployment. There were no clashes with civilians and the troops pulled out on May 5.

== Imposition of martial law ==
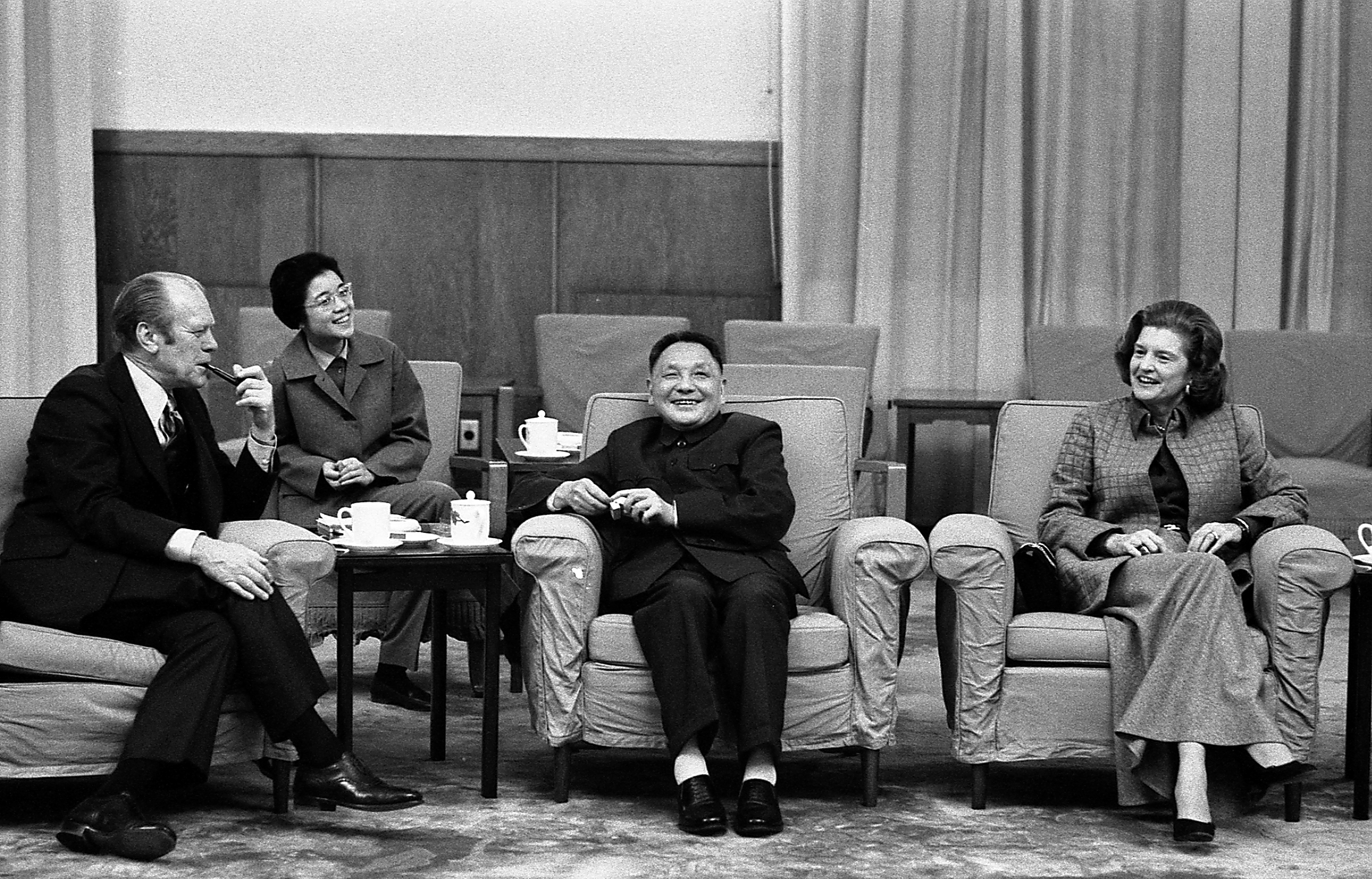
Deng Xiaoping with U.S. President Gerald Ford at the Great Hall of the People in 1975. Though he was neither CCP Chairman nor CCP General Secretary in 1989, Deng retained direct control of the PLA through his chairmanship of the Central Military Commission (CMC) and wielded influence through patronage of party and military leaders.

On May 11, Chinese President Yang Shangkun met with Deng privately to discuss the causes of the student movement, the popular support it was receiving and why it was difficult to halt. Deng explained that the demand of the people against official corruption was acceptable but the motive of some people using this demand as a pretext to overthrow the Chinese Communist Party (CCP) was not. He added that the party must use peaceful means to resolve the student movement but the Politburo of the CCP must be prepared to act decisively. On May 13, as the students embarked on a hunger strike in Tiananmen Square, Yang and the CCP General Secretary Zhao Ziyang gave Deng a private briefing. Deng, who was the Chairman of the Central Military Commission (CMC), expressed the impatience of party elders with the government's inability to end the student movement which had been active for nearly a month. He reiterated the need to act decisively.

=== Removal of Zhao Ziyang ===
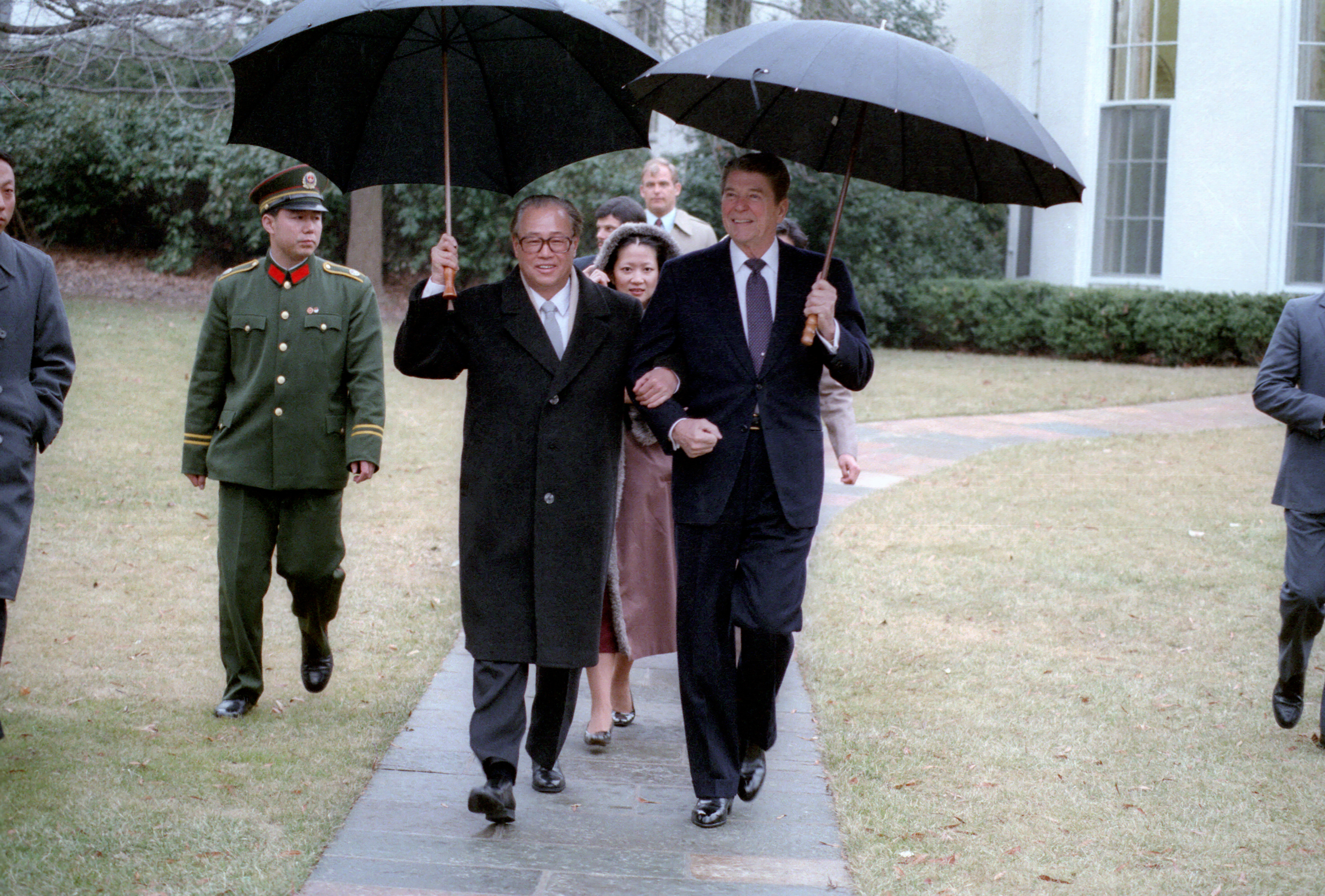
Premier Zhao Ziyang with U.S. President Ronald Reagan in 1984. In 1989, Zhao was the Party General Secretary and first vice-chairman of the CMC. But his accommodating stance toward the student demonstrators was criticized by party hardliners and lost the support of Deng Xiaoping. Zhao opposed the decision to impose martial law, lost power, and lived the remainder of his life under house arrest.

On the night of May 16, the five members of the CCP Politburo's Standing Committee, Zhao Ziyang, Li Peng, Qiao Shi, Hu Qili and Yao Yilin, along with President Yang Shangkun, Party elder Bo Yibo, the deputy director of the Central Advisory Commission, held an emergency meeting and agreed to (1) solicit the views of Deng Xiaoping and (2) have Zhao Ziyang negotiate with the hungerstriking students. On May 17, the five Standing Committee members visited Deng's residence, where Deng made clear that no more concessions could be made to the students and that the time had come to call in the military to impose martial law. The Standing Committee members agreed to convene in the evening to discuss how to implement martial law. That night, the five Standing Committee members could not agree on whether to impose martial law, with Li Peng and Yao Yilin in support, Zhao Ziyang and Hu Qili in opposition and Qiao Shi abstaining. Zhao offered to resign as Party General Secretary, but was dissuaded by Yang and asked for three days of sick leave. Subsequently, Zhao Ziyang ceased to have political influence.

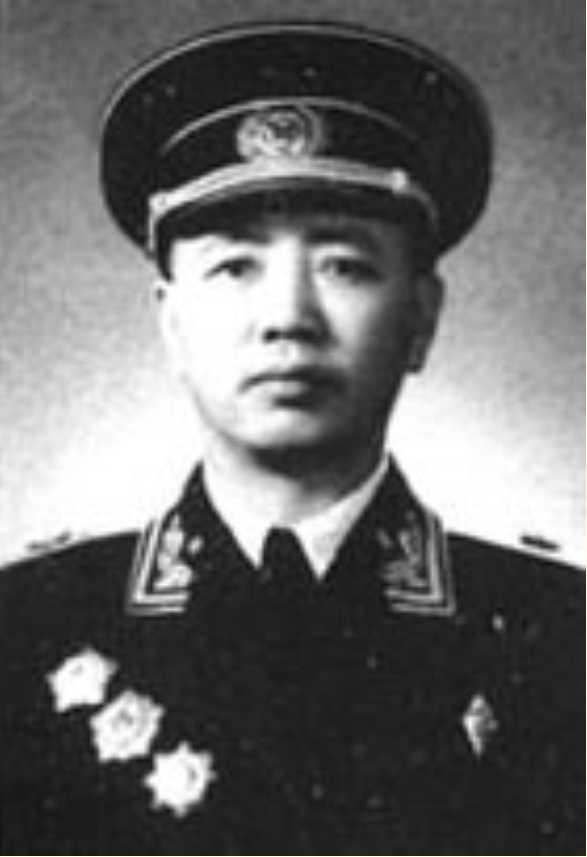
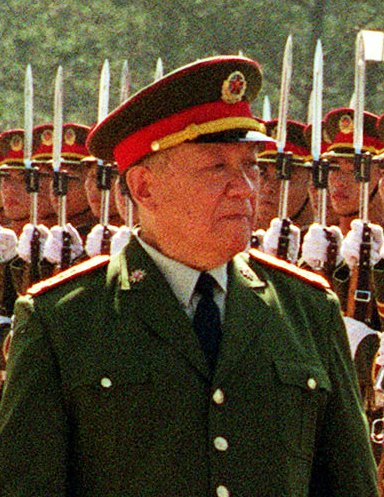
CMC members Liu Huaqing (left) the commander-in-chief of the martial law forces, and Chi Haotian, deputy commander, along with Zhou Yibing (not pictured).

On the morning of May 18, the Standing Committee, minus Zhao, along with party elders Chen Yun, Li Xiannian, Peng Zhen, Deng Yingchao, Bo Yibo, and Wang Zhen, along with Central Military Commission members Qin Jiwei, Hong Xuezhi and Liu Huaqing gathered at Deng's residence. At this meeting, the leadership resolved: (1) to impose martial law on the morning of May 21, (2) hold an expanded meeting with military and Beijing government officials on May 19, (3) have Yang Shangkun make arrangements with the military to establish a martial law command, (4) explain the decision to the two remaining PLA Marshals, Nie Rongzhen and Xu Xiangqian, and (5) inform provincial-level party committees of the Party Center's decision. On the afternoon of the May 18, the Central Military Commission appointed Liu Huaqing as the commander-in-chief of martial law operations with Chi Haotian, then PLA chief of staff, and Zhou Yibing, commander of the Beijing Military Region, as his deputies. The military forces enforcing martial law would be drawn mainly from the Beijing, Jinan and Shenyang Military Regions. Liu, Chi and Yang Shangkun then reported to Deng that the martial law force would mobilize 180,000 PLA and People's Armed Police personnel.

By May 18, the protests in Tiananmen Square had reached one million supporters. The protests caused deep divisions within the senior party leadership as well as the ranks of the PLA. On May 17, over 1,000 men from the People's Liberation Army's General Logistics Department showed their support for the movement by marching to Tiananmen Square, and they received enthusiastic applause from onlookers.

The decision to impose martial law was initially resisted by Defense Minister Qin Jiwei. After attending the meeting at Deng's home, Qin declined to send the martial law order to the military right away, citing the need to receive party approval. Zhao Ziyang, as General Secretary of the Chinese Communist Party, was nominally leader of the Chinese Communist Party. Qin called Zhao's office, hoping that Zhao would call off the martial law order. He waited four hours for Zhao's reply, which never came. Unbeknownst to Qin, Zhao had lost the power struggle and was purged from the leadership. Qin later publicly supported the military crackdown but his authority diminished thereafter.

=== Martial law declared – May 20 ===
Premier Li Peng announced martial law in the early morning hours of May 20. Beijing mayor Chen Xitong subsequently implemented orders for Beijing that were to go into effect at 10:00am.

Retired generals who opposed the imposition of martial law

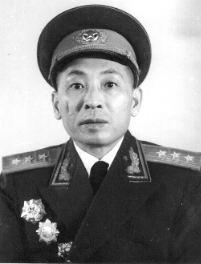
Ye Fei

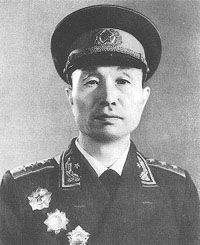
Zhang Aiping

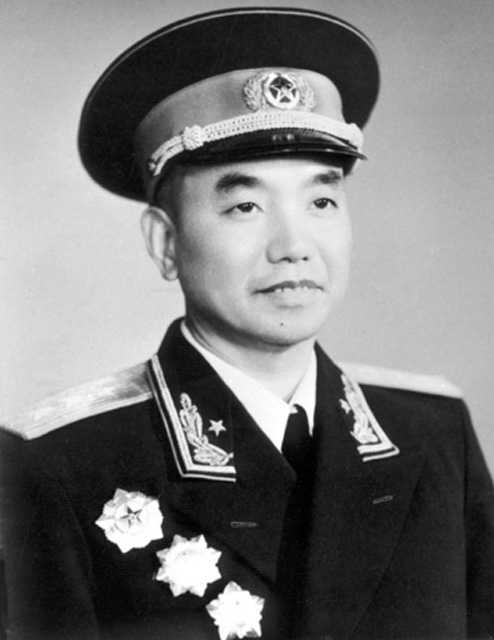
Xiao Ke

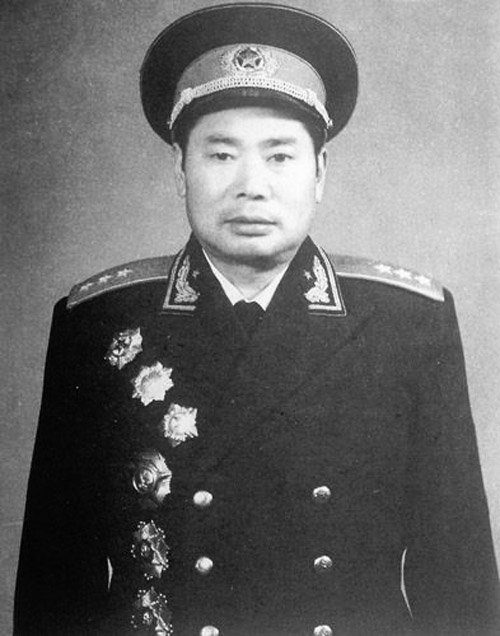
Yang Dezhi

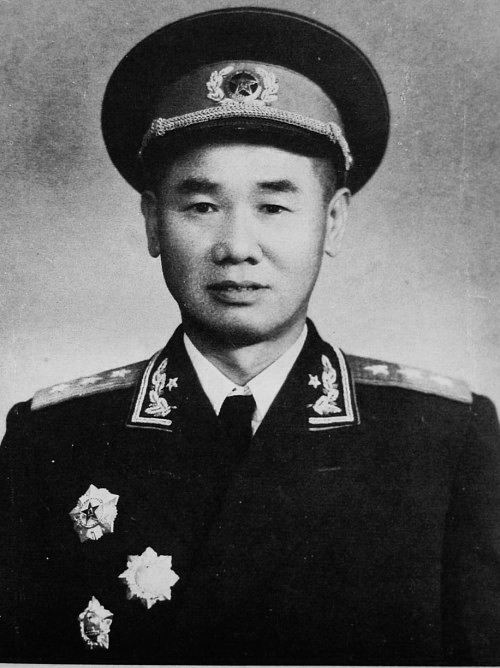
Chen Zaidao

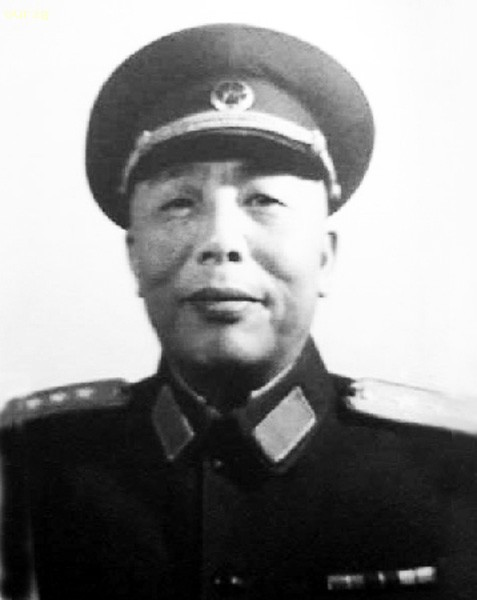
Song Shilun

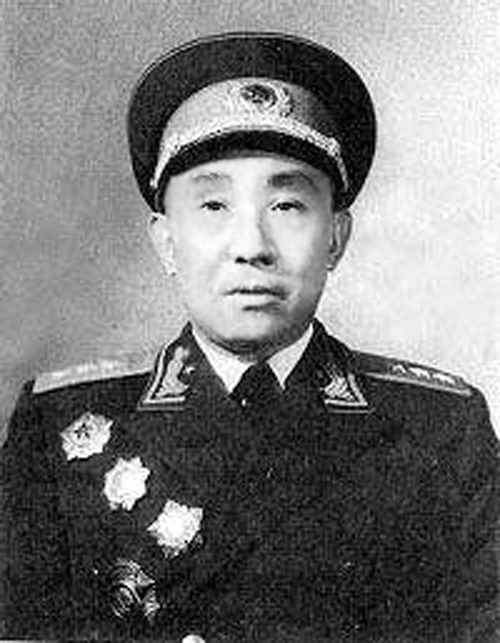
Li Jukui

On May 20, eight retired generals, including former defense minister Zhang Aiping, signed a one-sentence letter opposing the use of force:

We request that troops not enter the city and that martial law not be carried out in Beijing.

— Ye Fei, Zhang Aiping, Xiao Ke, Yang Dezhi, Chen Zaidao, Song Shilun, Wang Ping and Li Jukui, May 20, 1989 letter to the Central Military Commission

== Mobilization ==
On May 19, the Central Military Commission began mobilizing PLA units in anticipation of the announcement of martial law order. At least 14 of PLA's 24 army corps sent troops. Reliable estimates place the number of troops mobilized in the range of 180,000 to 250,000.

=== Units mobilized ===
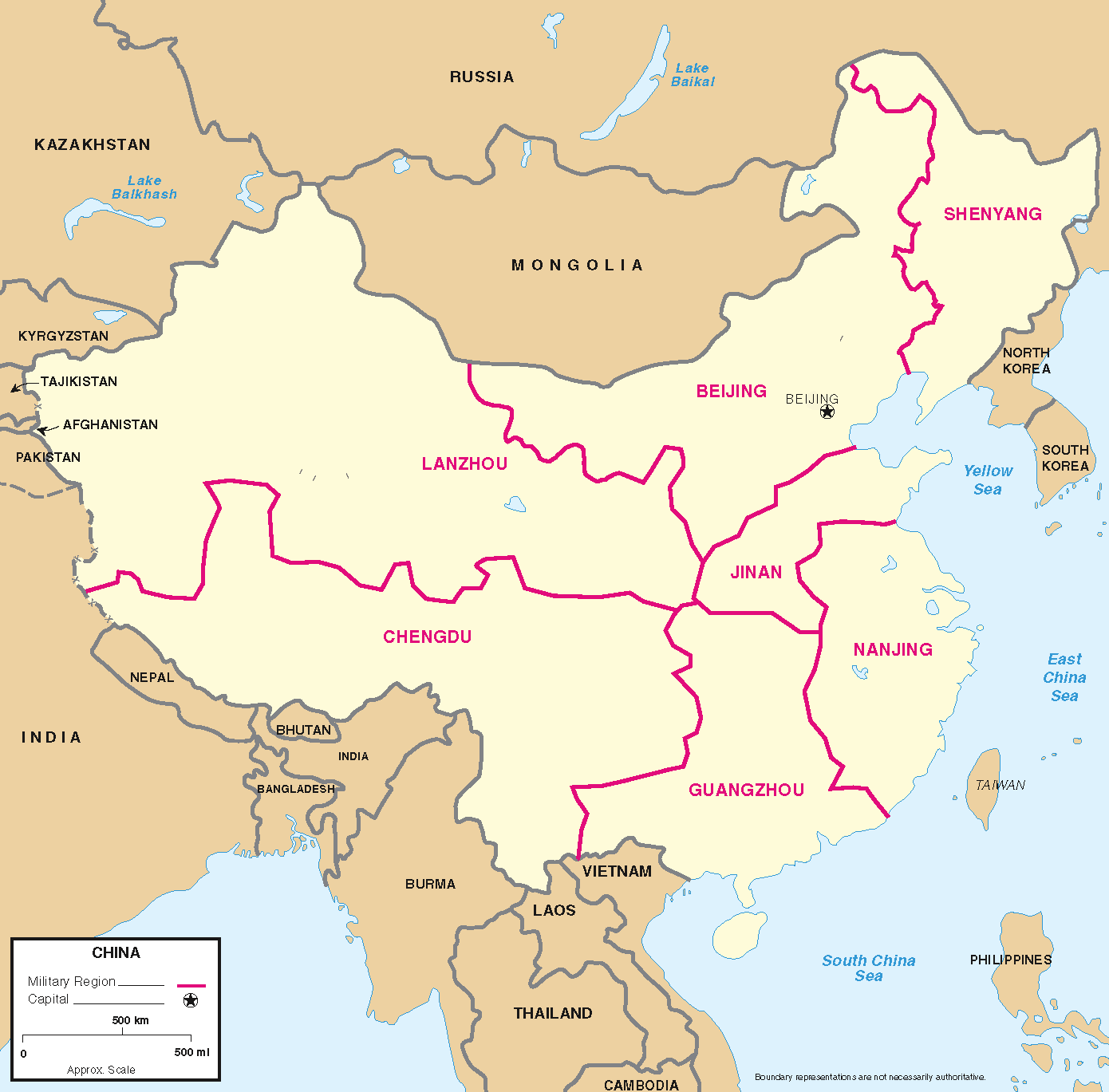
Five of the seven PLA Military Regions sent troops to Beijing to enforce martial law in 1989.

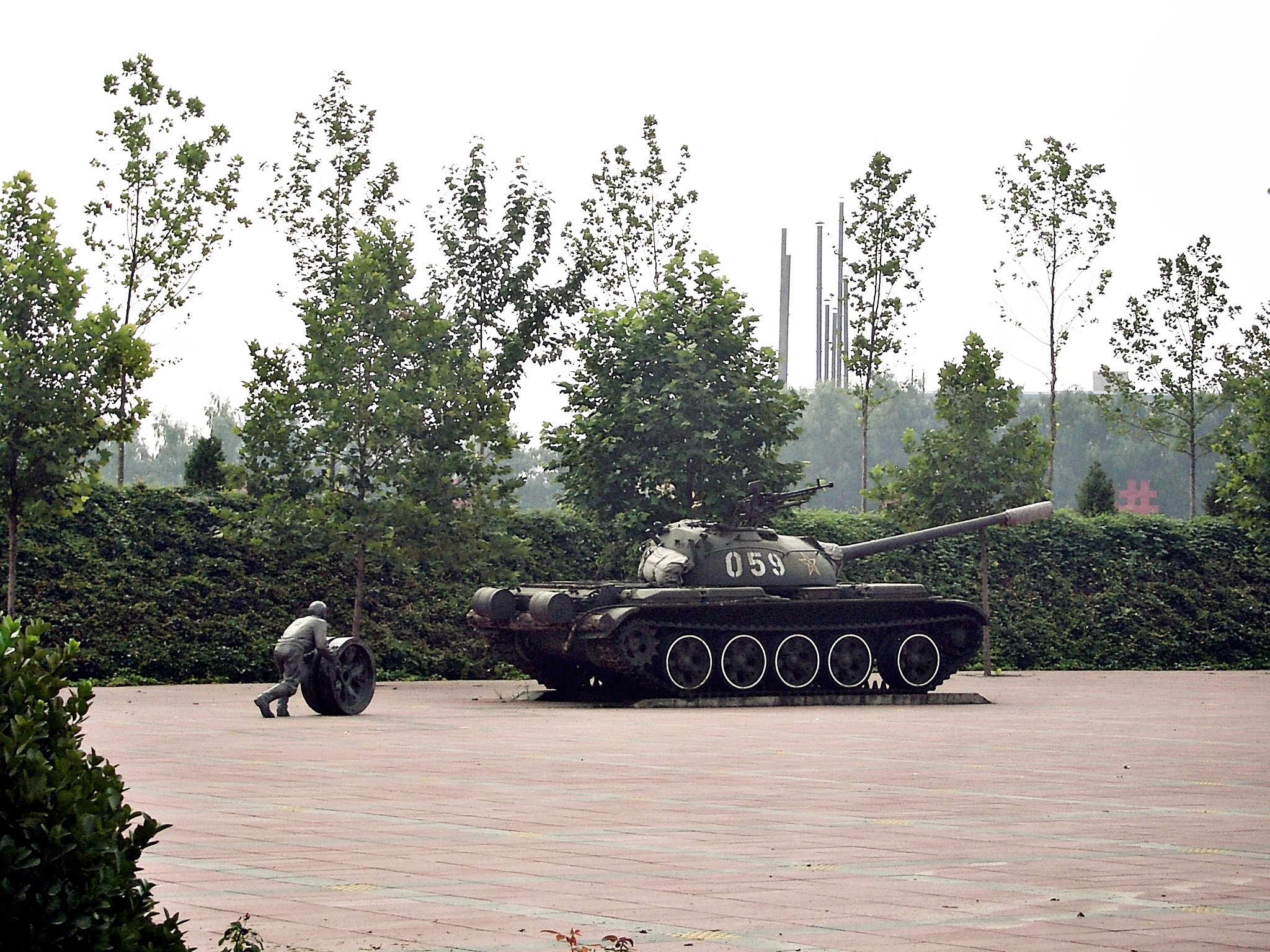
A monument featuring a Type 59 tank at a military base in Fengtai District on the outskirts of Beijing

During martial law operations, units from several PLA group armies were mobilized:

- 24th Army
- 27th Army
- 28th Army
- 38th Army
- 63rd Army
- 65th Army
- 39th Army
- 40th Army
- 54th Army
- 67th Army
- 15th Airborne Corps

== Attempt to enforce martial law on May 20–23 ==
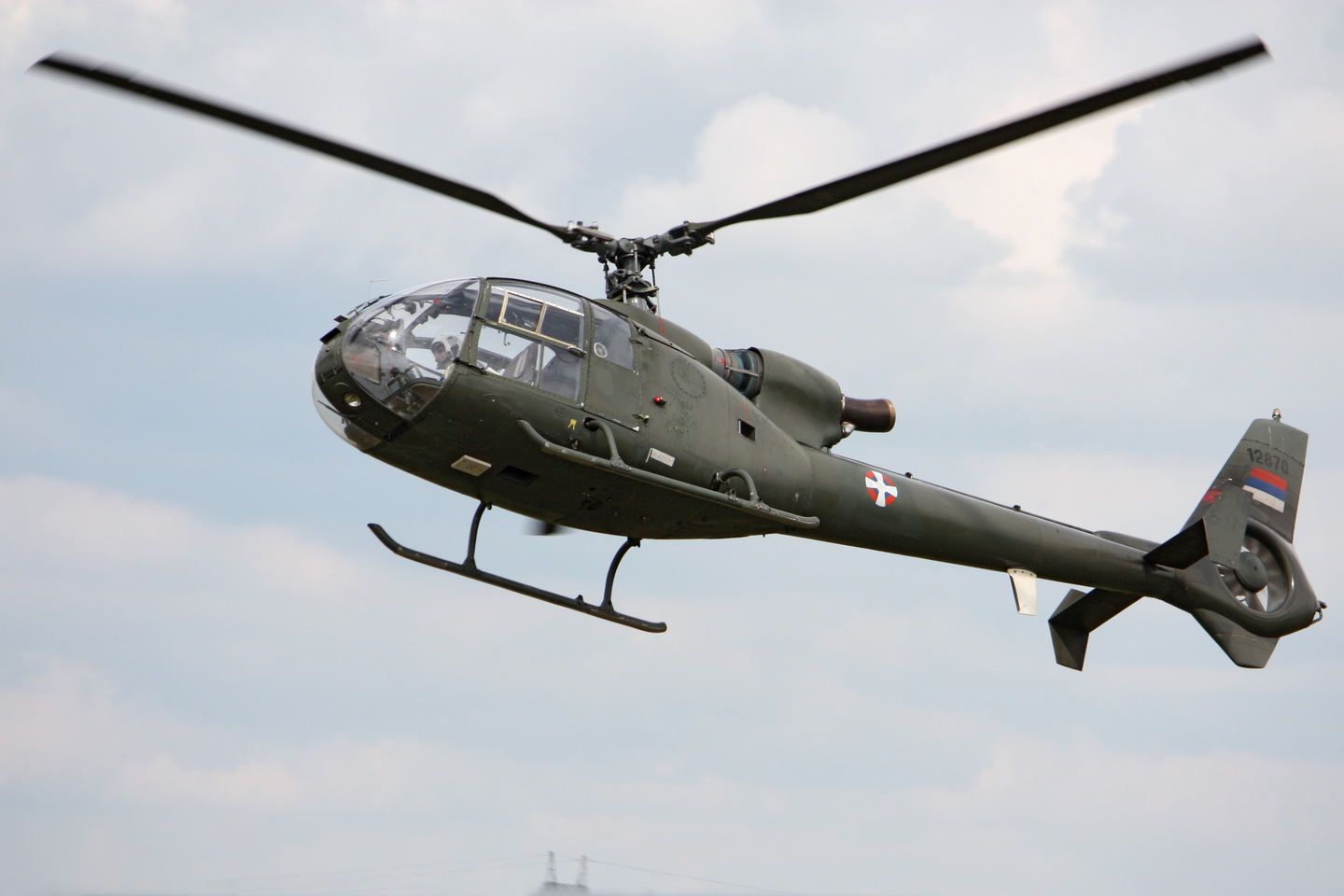
At least 5 SA 342L Gazelle light attack helicopters imported from France in 1988 were deployed over the skies of Tiananmen Square on May 20 to drop leaflets on demonstrators. The European Union's arms embargo in response to the military crackdown ended further European helicopter sales to China. (Pictured: a Serbian SA-342L1)

On May 20, military units from the 24th, 27th, 28th, 38th, 63rd, 65th, Beijing Garrison Command, 39th, 40th, 54th and 67th Armies advanced on the city from all directions. Many of the mobilized units were blocked by protesters who erected roadblocks in suburbs and streets and were unable to reach their assigned locations as originally planned, Larry Wortzel saw demonstrators preparing beer bottles filled with gasoline near one of these roadblocks.

The 15th Airborne Corps landed at the Nanyuan Airport south of the city to reinforce the 54th Army. Airlifts continued into Nanyuan continued for the next three days. Five helicopters of the 38th Army appeared over Tiananmen Square and dropped leaflets calling on protesters to vacate the square. The 65th Army made several efforts to advance on Tiananmen Square from the west but were forced to pull back into the Shijingshan and Haidian Districts. The only unit that advanced into the city was the 14th Artillery Division which traveled by train from Shahe but this unit was surrounded by civilians once it reached the Beijing railway station.

According to an article in PBS, residents of Beijing had attempted to engage in dialogue with the soldiers, seeking to explain why their presence was unwelcome. Orville Schell, who was in Beijing at the time, described moments where civilians appealed to the troops, offering food and water, and urging them to consider that the protesters could be their own children. The soldiers, many of whom were rural recruits unfamiliar with urban environments, appeared confused and hesitant, reluctant to cause harm. The troops were under orders not to fire on civilians, even if provoked. Consequently, they found themselves trapped, unable to advance toward the protesters gathered in Tiananmen Square, yet also unable to withdraw from the city for nearly three days.

=== Dajing Incident ===
At Dajing in Fengtai District, clashes broke out between demonstrators and troops. On the night of May 19, as troops advanced toward the Dajing Bridge, several students and residents blocking their advance were injured in clashes with riot police who were attempting to clear the way. During the clashes, the troops became stranded in the area for three days and three nights, and on May 22 they received the order to retreat.

The troops began to move towards an army storage facility in Fengtai but were attacked by the crowd during the retreat, resulting in scores of casualties; A soldier was reportedly killed and dozens more injured as their trucks were attacked, and 15 demonstrators were also injured. Several students trying to protect the troops were also hit by rocks. 10 suspects, none of whom were students, were later arrested.

=== Pullback ===
On May 24, PLA troops withdrew from urban Beijing. The failed attempt to control the growing protesters in Beijing forced the party leaders to call in additional PLA units. PLA soldiers were kept in isolation and underwent re-education to instill and reinforce the belief that a turmoil in the capital needed to be suppressed.

== Enforcement of martial law ==
At 4:00pm on June 3, Yang Shangkun, Li Peng, Qiao Shi, and Yao Yilin called an emergency meeting with Central Military Commission members Qin Jiwei, Hong Xuezhi, Liu Huaqing, Chi Haotian and Yang Baibing, PLA General Logistics chief Zhao Nanqi, Beijing Party Secretary Li Ximing, mayor Chen Xitong, State Council secretariat Luo Gan, Beijing Military Region commander Zhou Yibing and political commissar Liu Zhenhua to discuss the final steps for enforcing martial law:

1. The operation to quell the counterrevolutionary riot would begin at 9:00 p.m.
2. Military units should converge on the square by 1:00 a.m. on June 4 and the square must be cleared by 6:00 a.m.
3. Martial law troops must carry out their mission on schedule.
4. No person may impede the advance of the troops enforcing martial law. The troops may act in self-defense and use any manner to clear impediments.
5. CCTV, Central People's Broadcasting, and Beijing People's Broadcasting and Television will broadcast nonstop emergency announcements from the Beijing Municipal Government and the Martial Law Command. Important announcements will also be broadcast over loudspeakers in the Square.

That evening, the leaders monitored the situation from Zhongnanhai.

=== June 2–3 ===
On June 2, several army units were moved into the city, many in plainclothes. Student leaders ordered demonstrators to block the advance of the troops. The same day, 3 pedestrians were killed in a traffic accident involving a police jeep being borrowed by CCTV, which inflamed tensions.

Many of the troops that infiltrated the city center did not carry weapons or other equipment, which had to be delivered to them in unmarked vehicles. East of Tiananmen Square, demonstrators isolated groups of soldiers; In some areas soldiers who were caught were rounded up and taken to locations where demonstrators lectured at, span on, and kicked them. Several of the unmarked vehicles carrying military equipment were intercepted; a crowd intercepted three buses at Liubukou, and equipment including helmets, guns, grenades, bullets, and gas masks were taken. At about 2:00 pm, 700-800 riot police rushed out of Zhongnanhai to recover the vehicle, using tear gas to attempt to disperse the crowd; The ensuing clash left many injured, and police eventually withdrew to into the Zhongnanhai West Gate.

Troops began to retreat at about 5:30pm, with some 3,000 withdrawing from the Great Hall of the People. Ambulances carrying injured soldiers were blocked, and students and residents captured military vehicles during the retreat.

=== June 3–4 ===
At 6:30 pm on 3 June, the Beijing Municipal Government and Martial Law Command issued an emergency announcement advising citizens to "stay off the streets and away from Tiananmen Square". This announcement was broadcast for several hours across radio and television. Meanwhile, protesters used student loudspeakers in various university campuses in Beijing to call for students and citizens to arm themselves and assemble at intersections and the Square.

==== From the west ====
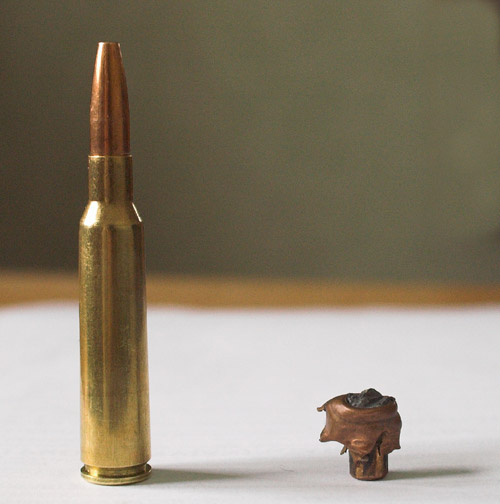
An expanding bullet before and after firing. Such bullets are banned by the Hague Conventions of 1899 and 1907 for use in warfare, but are commonly used for hunting and by law enforcement.

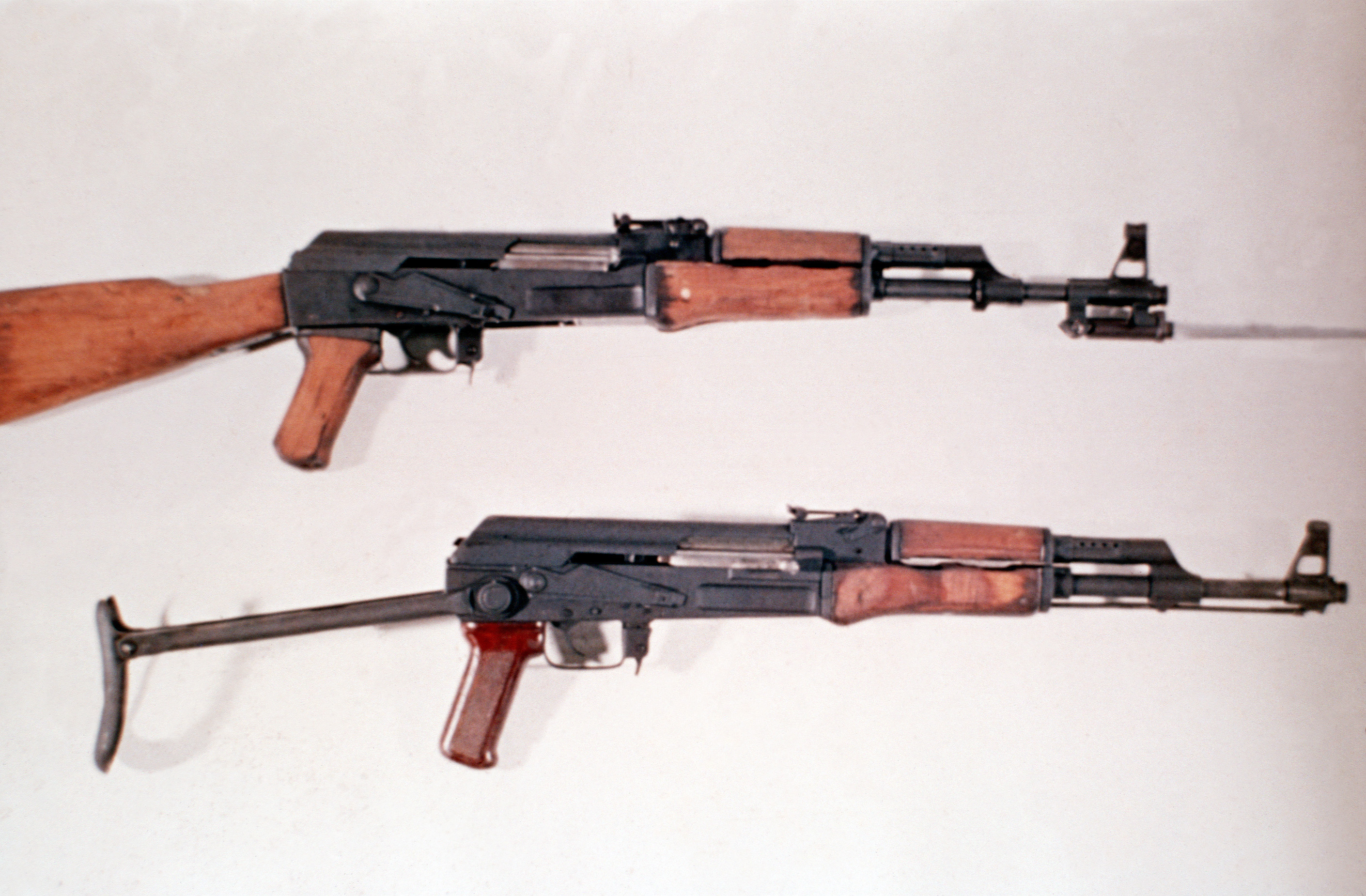
The Type 56 assault rifle of the PLA infantry (below) is a variant of the AK-47 (above) that could fire at rates of up to 650 rounds per minute with an effective range of 300–400 m.

On June 3, at 8:00 p.m., the 38th Army, led by interim commander Zhang Meiyuan, began to advance from military office compounds in Shijingshan and Fentai District in western Beijing along the western extension of Chang'an Avenue toward the square to the east. At 9:30 p.m, this army encountered a blockade set up by protesters at Gongzhufen in Haidian District. Troops armed with anti-riot gear clashed with the protesters, firing rubber bullets and tear gas, while the protesters threw rocks and soda bottles at them. Other troops fired warning shots into the air, which was ineffective. At 10:10 pm, an army officer picked up a megaphone and urged the protesters to disperse.

At about 10:30 p.m., the 38th Army attempted to dismantle the protesters' barricades and protesters, in response, threw rocks and someone reportedly set a bus on fire. The soldiers then opened fire on protesters at the Wukesong intersection on Chang'an Avenue, about 10 km west of the square. The crowds were stunned that the army was using live ammunition, and fell back towards the Muxidi Bridge; The retreat was hindered by their own roadblock, and many in the crowd were trampled and injured. The troops allegedly used expanding bullets, which expand and fragment upon entering the body and create larger wounds.

The advance of the army was again halted at Muxidi, about 5 km west of the square, where they encountered another blockade made up of articulated trolleybuses that were placed across a bridge and set on fire. An anti-riot brigade attempted to storm the bridge, but were driven back by a barrage of broken bricks the protesters had prepared beforehand. Regular troops then rushed onto the bridge, chanting, "If no one attacks me, I attack no one; but if people attack me, I must attack them", and turning their weapons on the crowd. Soldiers alternated between shooting into the air and firing directly at protesters. According to the tabulation of victims by Tiananmen Mothers, 36 people died at Muxidi, including Wang Weiping, a doctor tending to the wounded. As the battle continued eastward, the firing became indiscriminate, with "random, stray patterns" killing both protesters and uninvolved bystanders. Several were killed in the apartments of high-ranking party officials overlooking the boulevard. Soldiers raked the apartment buildings with gunfire, and some people inside or on their balconies were shot. The 38th Army also used armored personnel carriers to ram through blockades. As the army advanced, fatalities were recorded along Chang'an Avenue. By far, the largest number occurred in the two-mile stretch of road running from Muxidi to Xidan, where "65 PLA trucks and 47 APCs ... were totally destroyed, and 485 other military vehicles were damaged."

A noteworthy death near Xidan – that of 25-year-old 2nd Lieutenant Liu Guogeng, a PLA company commander – reveals stark differences between the narrative accounts that parties glorifying or vilifying the PLA offer regarding the battle. Both sides recount that Liu's charred, disemboweled body was found hanging from a bus near Xidan, wearing only socks and a hat. Graphic images of his corpse were published by both pro- and anti-PLA media. According to the official account, Liu's unit was surrounded, and a few disabled vehicles fell behind the rest of the convoy. Liu then went on foot to retrieve his comrades, but was captured at Liubukou and beaten for an hour. He escaped, but was recaptured some distance west, killed and mutilated. He was later declared a "national martyr" and "people's hero". According to the alternative, anti-PLA account, Liu was captured and lynched after killing four people (including one child) at close range with his assault rifle. Slogans describing his alleged deeds were scrawled on the side of the bus where his body had been hung.

==== From the south ====
The 15th Airborne Corps and 54th Group Army left the Beijing Nanyuan Airport at 2:00 AM, advancing Tiananmen Square from the south, with PAP units serving as the lead elements. They met resistance from demonstrators, who had set up roadblocks made up of buses and trucks. Initial attempts by PAP troops to disperse the defenders with nightsticks were ineffective. Tanks and armored personnel carriers were able to easily cut through the roadblocks, but resistance became stiffer as the PLA advanced further into the city. Urban fighters disabled armored vehicles using steel bars from road dividers to break their tracks and wheels, before covering them with blankets doused in gasoline and set on fire. PLA crews who exited the vehicles were attacked with rocks and molotov cocktails. Larry Wortzel noted that this swarming tactic was clearly rehearsed and practiced, having been used by demonstrators in the same way in street fighting in other places around the city, especially during the battle at Muxidi, noting, "By this time, having seen their fellow soldiers killed, the troops were scared. Political commissars had told them for 2 weeks that there were 'counter-revolutionary criminals' in the city. Predictably, the troops reacted by opening fire." Throughout the fighting, disabled armored vehicles slowed the progress of the army's trucks and troops.

The 12th Army was airlifted to the Nanyuan Airport on June 4 and was not deployed on the city.

==== From the east ====
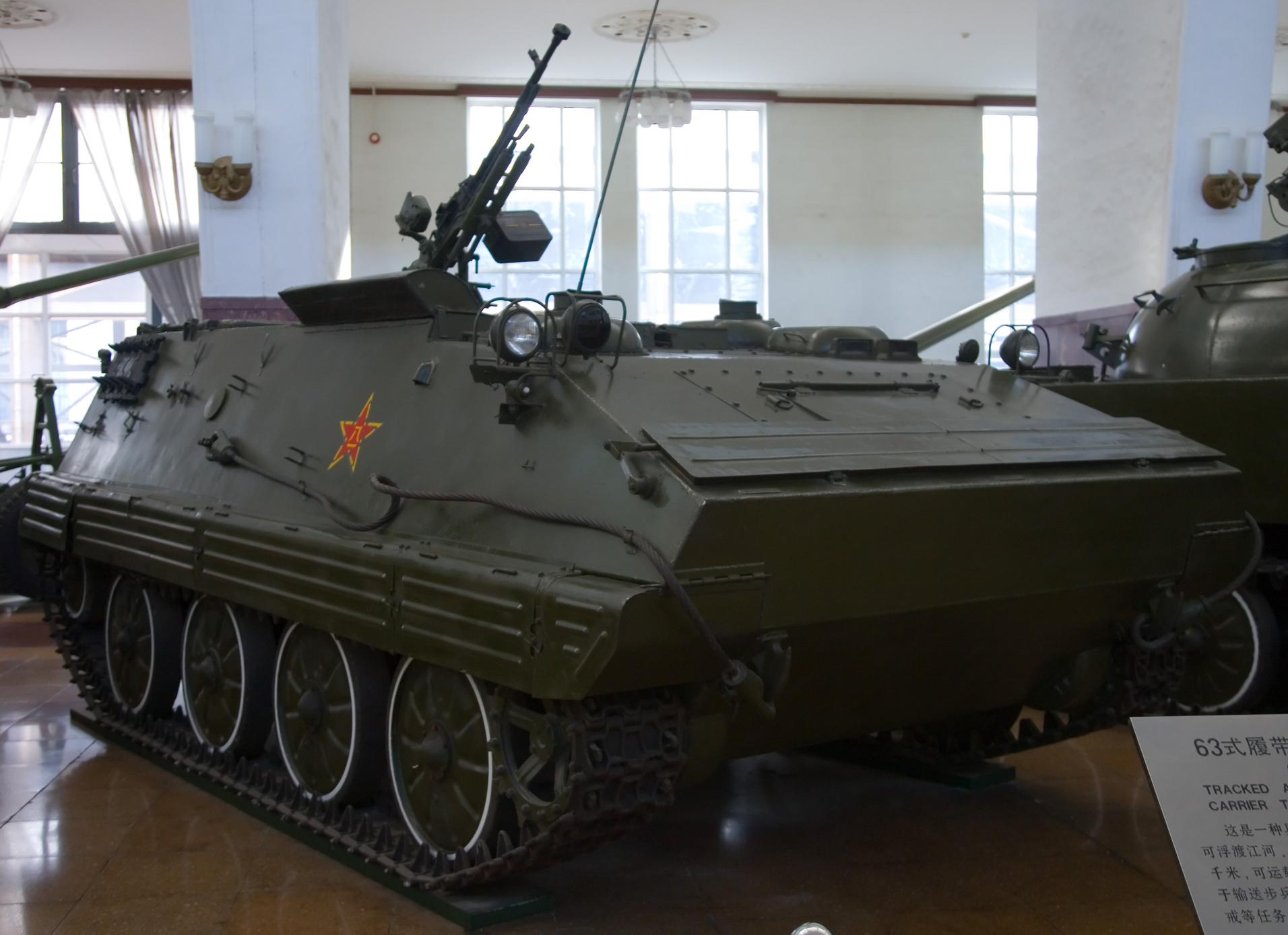
The Type 63 armored personnel carrier, weighing 12.8 tons and with maximum speed of 60 km/h and range of 500 km, is operated by a crew of two and can carry up to 13 infantry. On the night of June 3, demonstrators tried to disable Type 63 APCs by jamming metal poles into the wheels and covering the vehicles with blankets set on fire.

At 8:00 p.m., the 39th Army left the Sanjianfang Military Airport in Tong County and advanced eastward toward the square through Chaoyang and Dongcheng Districts. The 67th Army also left Tong County and moved from Dingfuzhuang, Dabeiyao, Hujialou, Jianguomen, East Chang'an Avenue to Tiananmen Square. The 14th Artillery Division departed from the Beijing railway station and moved toward the east side of the square.

At 10:00 p.m., the first squad of the 1st Armored Division left Yangzha in Tong County and moved west along the Beijing-Tangshan Highway. Earlier, at 4:00 pm, this unit had been ordered to move from Sanhe in Hebei to the Beijing Garrison Command barracks at Yangzha. At Baliqiao, the first squad's advance was halted by a human chain of demonstrators and jack-knifed buses. At midnight, a vanguard unit of three APCs split from the main squad in search of a new route and moved over to the Beijing-Tianjin Highway. The main squad followed. Over the next four hours, the armored units smashed through barricaded intersections at Shilipu, Balizhuang, Hujialou, Dabeiyao, and Jianguomen, and reached the square at about 5:00 am. The rest of the first squad followed at 5:40 am.

The second squad of the 1st Armored Division left Sanhe the night of June 3 and encountered numerous roadblocks before its advance was completely halted at Shuangjing, where residents barricaded the road with dozens of trucks and surrounded the convoy. Angry residents told the troops of bloodshed in the city and smashed the lights and machine gun mounts on some of vehicles. Scores of soldiers were injured. Division commander Xu Qingren and commissar Wu Zhongming chose not to harm civilians and stayed at Shuangjing for 13 hours from about 6:40 am to 7:40 pm, during which time residents brought food and water to the soldiers. The tank units of the second squad did not reach the square until 1:40 am on June 5 and some of the troops arrived on June 7.

===== Insubordination of 116th Division, 39th Army =====
On the evening of June 3, Xu Feng, the division commander, switched to plain clothes and carried out his own reconnaissance of the city. When he returned, he told subordinates "not to look for him" and went into the division's communications vehicle. Thereafter, the division maintained radio silence and did not advance on Beijing, except for the 347th Regiment under Ai Husheng, which complied with orders and went to Tiananmen Square on June 4. On June 5, the rest of the division was escorted by other units to the square. Xu Feng was later disciplined for passive resistance.

==== From the north ====
The 40th Army departed the Beijing Capital Airport at 3:35 pm and advanced on the city from the northeast via the Airport Highway, Taiyanggong, Sanyuanqiao and Dongzhimen.

The 64th Army left its assembly point at the Shahe Military Airport in Changping County north of the city and moved south along Madian, Qinghe, Xueyuan Road, Hepingli, to Deshengmen.

=== June 4 ===
==== In Tiananmen Square ====
At about 1:30 a.m., the 38th Army and the 15th Airborne Corps arrived at the north and south ends of the square respectively. The 14th Artillery Division had reached the Museum of Chinese History, on the east side of the square, at 12:15 a.m. The 27th and 65th Armies spilled out of the Great Hall of the People on the west side of the square. The 63rd Army held the east side of the square. The 24th, 39th, 54th Armies and the 14th Artillery Division controlled the perimeter of the square, and by 2:00 a.m., the encirclement was complete. Crowds trying to re-enter the square from East Chang'an Avenue were driven off by gunfire. At the time, several thousand students remained huddled around the Monument to the People's Heroes inside the square.

As the students debated what to do, Hou Dejian negotiated for safe passage out of the square with the army. At 3:30 a.m., at the suggestion of two doctors in the Red Cross camp, Hou Dejian and Zhuo rode in an ambulance to the northeast corner of the square and spoke with Ji Xinguo, the political commissar of the 336th Regiment, who relayed the request to command headquarters, which agreed to grant safe passage for the students to the southeast. At 4:00 a.m., the lights on the square abruptly shut, signalling the end of the army's patience. To break the students' spirits, Company No. 5 of the 2nd Brigade, 334th Regiment knocked down the Goddess of Democracy statue at the north end of the square. At 4:30 a.m., the lights relit as the soldiers moved into action.

Under the leadership of brigadier commander Wu Yunping of the 44th Airborne Brigade, troops advanced on the Monument and at about 4:40 a.m., shot out the students' loudspeakers. By then, the majority of the students had been persuaded by Liu Xiaobo and Hou Dejian to leave the square. After negotiations with the soldiers, the students left the square to the southeast. Some were beaten by soldiers along the way. Army vehicles then ran over the tent city, leading to conflicting accounts as to whether there were casualties inflicted as a result. Both Hou and Liu however have stated to have seen no killings in the square.Jay Mathews, writing in the Columbia Journalism Review, stated: "A few people may have been killed by random shooting on streets near the square, but all verified eyewitness accounts say that the students who remained in the square when troops arrived were allowed to leave peacefully." By 5:30 a.m. the square was cleared. Debris was lifted out by helicopter.

==== Elsewhere in Beijing ====
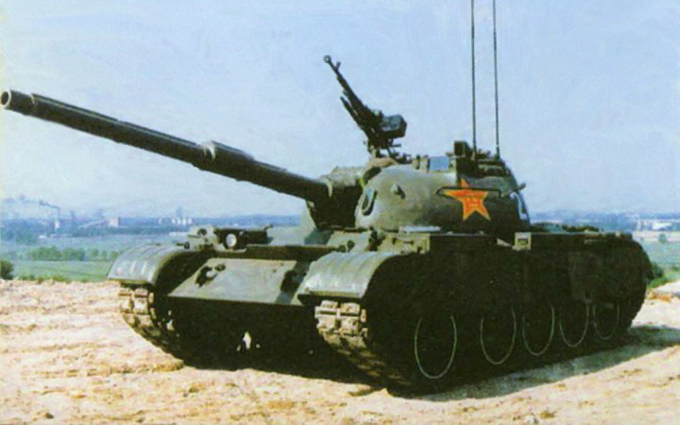
The Type 59 main battle tank, weighing 36 tons and operated by a crew of four, has a top speed of 50 km/h and operational range of 450 km.

At about 5:20 a.m., the 1st Armored Division's first squad was ordered to disperse demonstrators around Zhongnanhai. Under regiment commander Luo Gang and commissar Jia Zhenlu, eight tanks left the square and moved west along Chang'an Avenue. Their advance was halted by several hundred students lying in the street, who refused to move despite verbal warnings and shots fired into the air. The tanks then fired military-grade tear gas, which proved unbearable to the students, who scattered. The tanks reached Xinhua Gate of Zhongnanhai at 7:25 a.m., where several stayed to guard the gate and others proceeded westward. At the Liubukou intersection, the tanks came upon thousands of students, who had just vacated Tiananmen Square, and were walking in the bicycle lane on the side of the avenue back toward campus. Three tanks fired tear gas at the students and one, No. 106, drove into the crowd, killing 11 and injuring at least nine, including Fang Zheng. Luo Gang, who was promoted to the deputy division commander, claims in his memoirs that tanks under his command did not run over anyone.

Later in the morning, some demonstrators regrouped and approached the square from the northeast on East Chang'an Avenue, but were driven off by gunfire as they attempted to enter the square, which remained closed to the public for two weeks.

At 6:00am, about a hundred students met thousands of local residents at Qianmen, and together they shouted slogans at troops, but dispersed when the soldiers started to shoot at the sky; one student was wounded in the shooting.

=== After June 4 ===
On June 5, having secured the square, the military began to reassert control over thoroughfares through the city, especially Chang'an Avenue. A column of tanks of the 1st Armored Division left the square and heading east on Chang'an Avenue and came upon a lone protester standing in the middle of the avenue. The brief standoff between the man and the tanks was captured by Western media atop the Beijing Hotel. As the tank driver attempted to go around him, the man moved into the tank's path. He stood defiantly in front of the tanks for some time, then climbed up onto the turret of the lead tank to speak to the soldiers inside. After returning to his position in front of the tanks, the man was pulled aside by a group of people. Charlie Cole, who was there for Newsweek, claimed that the men were Chinese government agents, while Jan Wong, who was there for The Globe and Mail, thought that they were concerned bystanders.

According to Li Xiaoming, an officer in the 116th Division, a soldier in his unit fired at a crowd that had surrounded other troops outside the Xinhua News Agency, defying orders to fire into the air or the ground to intimidate the crowd. Li estimates that fewer than one out of 1,000 soldiers actually fired on crowds, for otherwise, "blood would have flowed like river through the streets" as it would take "only ten soldiers each emptying their magazine, to kill 300–400 people."

Snipers continued to fire at troops in the days following 3–4 June. On June 7, troops from the 39th Army fired on the diplomatic apartments along Jianguomen Outer Street after sniper fire from that direction reportedly shot and killed one soldier, Zang Lijie, and wounded three others. Troops sealed off the compound and arrested a suspected sniper after a search of the apartments lasting an hour. Larry Wortzel, a military intelligence officer at the U.S. Embassy, stated that he received advance warning of the shooting with exact hours along with buildings and floors to avoid.

On the morning of 17 June, the square was re-opened to the public, and a ceremony was held at the Monument to the People's Heroes for soldiers who died in the operation to take the square. The same day, two individuals were captured after exchanging gunfire with soldiers.

On 18 June, 8 people were sentenced to death for attacking troops and military vehicles.

== Military resistance to martial law orders ==
=== Prior to June 3–4 ===
PLA soldiers joined in on the demonstrations of the student movement in Tiananmen Square before and after the declaration of martial law on May 20, 1989. On May 16, 1989; the same day that Soviet leader Mikhail Gorbachev met with Deng Xiaoping, 1,000 soldiers paraded with the students down Chang'an Boulevard. On May 23, 1989, 100 naval cadets walked through Tiananmen Square chanting, "Down with Li Peng." Soldiers were deployed to Beijing the night before and after martial law was declared. During their training they were taught to obey orders and not to question the demands of the party. They were also instructed not to accept food from the students or participate in conversations with them. However, not all PLA soldiers followed these orders. The people of Beijing offered food and drinks that were accepted by the troops which disobeyed the Chinese Communist Party's orders. Chen Guang, who was deployed to suppress the movement on May 19, 1989, described the students as, "Very friendly, with bright smiles. Their spirit was welcoming." When the army retreated the students held banners stating, "The PLA came on orders. We support you. There is no disorder in Beijing. You guys go on home." Chen suggested that this treatment made him question his purpose in suppressing the movement. He stated, "All at once you felt like you hadn't understood this society... You start to think about these problems. Before that, you didn't have that kind of conscious."

Then, on May 29, 1989, the high command of the Navy sent a report to the Party centre supporting its decision in introducing martial law. However, naval officers also included concerns that were outlined in their report. They did not support the denunciation of Zhao Ziyang and worried about whether the Chinese Communist Party leadership was stable. They also suggested that the CCP listen to the demands of the students especially in terms of public security, corruption, and the imbalance between wages. Chairman of the Central Military Commission, Deng Xiaoping and his orders were met with resistance from both higher and medium ranking PLA officials after the declaration of martial law. Many veterans and top military leaders also signed petitions against soldiers using force against the protesters such as: Nie Rongzhen, Xu Xiangqian, Zhang Aiping, and Ye Fei.

==== On June 3–4 ====
Scholars estimate that on the evening of June 3, 1989, Deng deployed 150,000 to 350,000 troops with heavy artillery to enter and surround Beijing. However, many of the soldiers in the People's Liberation Army did not follow the orders to enforce martial law that night. Some soldiers were emotionally conflicted and were hesitant to turn their weapons on the students. They believed that the PLA belonged to the people and that they were supposed to fight for them and not against them. They were reminded of this sentiment by bystanders and protesters during their multiple attempts in clearing the square prior to and on the night of the massacre.

Therefore, some PLA units did not have ammunition with them when they entered Beijing, including the 40th army unit. Party officials reportedly suspected this unit of not following the martial law orders that were declared by Li Peng. American journalists claimed that on the night of the massacre the 38th unit soldiers told civilians and bystanders that if they had weapons they would have used them against the soldiers firing on civilians. In addition, some soldiers of the PLA willingly dismounted from tanks and other army vehicles and did not stop civilians from burning them down. PLA soldier Chen Guang stated that desertion never crossed his mind, however, it did occur on the night of the massacre as approximately 400 soldiers deserted during the night of June 3. Chinese reports state that these soldiers were missing in action.

Finally, Li Xiaoming was an officer in the 116th army division in the 39th group army and was one of the first soldiers to talk about the events of Tiananmen publicly. Some soldiers in the 116th army division did not support the violence against the students and felt empathy towards the victims of the massacre. The division's commander Xu Feng refused to obey orders and pretended not to receive any messages from higher officials. Therefore, on June 4, instead of entering the city, the unit continuously circled Beijing. By June 5 the division was escorted into the city to help with the clean-up process. They were exposed to damaged infrastructure due to tanks and bullets, as well as blood stained clothes scattered around the square.

==== Insubordination of 28th Army at Muxidi ====
The 28th Army was notable for its passive enforcement of the martial law order. The unit, led by commander He Yanran and political commissar Zhang Mingchun and based in Datong, Shanxi Province, received the mobilization order on May 19. They proceeded to lead the mechanized units to Yanqing County northwest of Beijing's city centre. When ordered to enter the city on June 3, the 28th encountered protesting residents along route but did not open fire and missed the deadline to reach Tiananmen Square by 5:30 a.m. on June 4. At 7:00am, the 28th Army ran into a throng of angry residents at Muxidi on West Chang'an Avenue west of the square. The residents told the soldiers of the killings from earlier in the morning and showed blood stained shirts of victims. At noon, Liu Huaqing, the commander of the martial law enforcement action, ordered Wang Hai, head of the PLA Air Force, to fly over Muxidi by helicopter and order by loudspeaker the 28th Army to counterattack. But on the ground, the commanders of the 28th refused to comply. Instead the troops abandoned their positions en masse. By 5:00 pm, many had retreated into the Military Museum of the Chinese People's Revolution nearby. Of all units involved in the crackdown, the 28th Army lost by far the most equipment, as 74 vehicles including 31 armored personnel carriers and two communications vehicles were burned. The unit was later removed and ordered to undergo six months of reorganization. Afterwards, all commanding officers were demoted and reassigned to other units.

===== Xu Qinxian's defiance =====
The extraordinary scale of the mobilization may have been motivated by concerns of insubordination. Xu Qinxian, the commander of the 38th Army, the best-equipped army corps of the Beijing Military Region, refused to enforce the martial law order. Xu said he could not comply with a verbal order to mobilize and demanded to see a written order. When told by the Beijing Military Regional command that it "was wartime" and a written order would be provided later, Xu, who had spent time in Beijing earlier in the spring, said there was no war and reiterated his refusal to carry out the order. President Yang Shangkun sent Zhou Yibing, the commander of the regional command to Baoding to persuade Xu. Xu asked Zhou whether the three principals of the Central Military Commission had approved the martial law order. Zhou replied that while Deng Xiaoping, the chairman, and Yang Shangkun, the secretary-general, had approved, Zhao Ziyang, the first vice-chairman, had not. Without Zhao's approval, Xu refused to act on the order and asked for sick leave. He was court-martialled and the 38th Army under his replacement mobilized to enforce the martial law order.

After Xu's insubordination, the 12th Army, which Deng Xiaoping had personally led during the Chinese Civil War, was airlifted from Nanjing. The 12th Army was the only unit mobilized from the Nanjing Military Region.

==== After the Night of June 4 ====
After the events of the massacre, thousands of PLA soldiers congregated in Beijing where infighting between the various units reportedly occurred. Popular opinion of the massacre suggests that the 27th field army was to blame for the worst crimes against the civilians and students of Beijing during the night of the massacre, and was deemed the most loyal to Deng Xiaoping. Therefore, rumours existed stating that this unit clashed with soldiers from the 16th army because, as some would suggest, it openly opposed the treatment of the students. On June 6, 1989, two days after the square was cleared, the 27th field army kept their tanks and weapons pointed at the borders of Beijing against potential threats to the CCP, as well as on the suspected disloyal troops. A unit of 400 men was kept under constant watch and had guns pointed towards them from the 27th field army to avoid any disloyal action.

On the campus of Beijing's National Defence University, a poster was put up condemning the CCP's role in the suppression of the students on June 4. It is suspected that it was put up by soldiers.

== Casualties ==
According to Chinese government documents, 10 PLA soldiers and 13 PAP soldiers were killed. State-run media at the time reported that "tens" of soldiers, armed police and Beijing municipal police were killed and over 6,000 injured. One of the early reported deaths occurred on May 22, 1989, when troops began to move towards an army storage facility in Fengtai but were attacked by a crowd with a soldier reportedly killed and dozens more injured as their trucks were attacked, as well as 15 demonstrators also injured.

On 19 June, Beijing Party Secretary Li Ximing reported to the Politburo that the government's confirmed death toll was 241, including 218 civilians (of which 36 were students), 10 PLA soldiers, and 13 People's Armed Police, along with 7,000 wounded, including 5,000 soldiers and police alongside 2,000 civilians.

== Aftermath ==
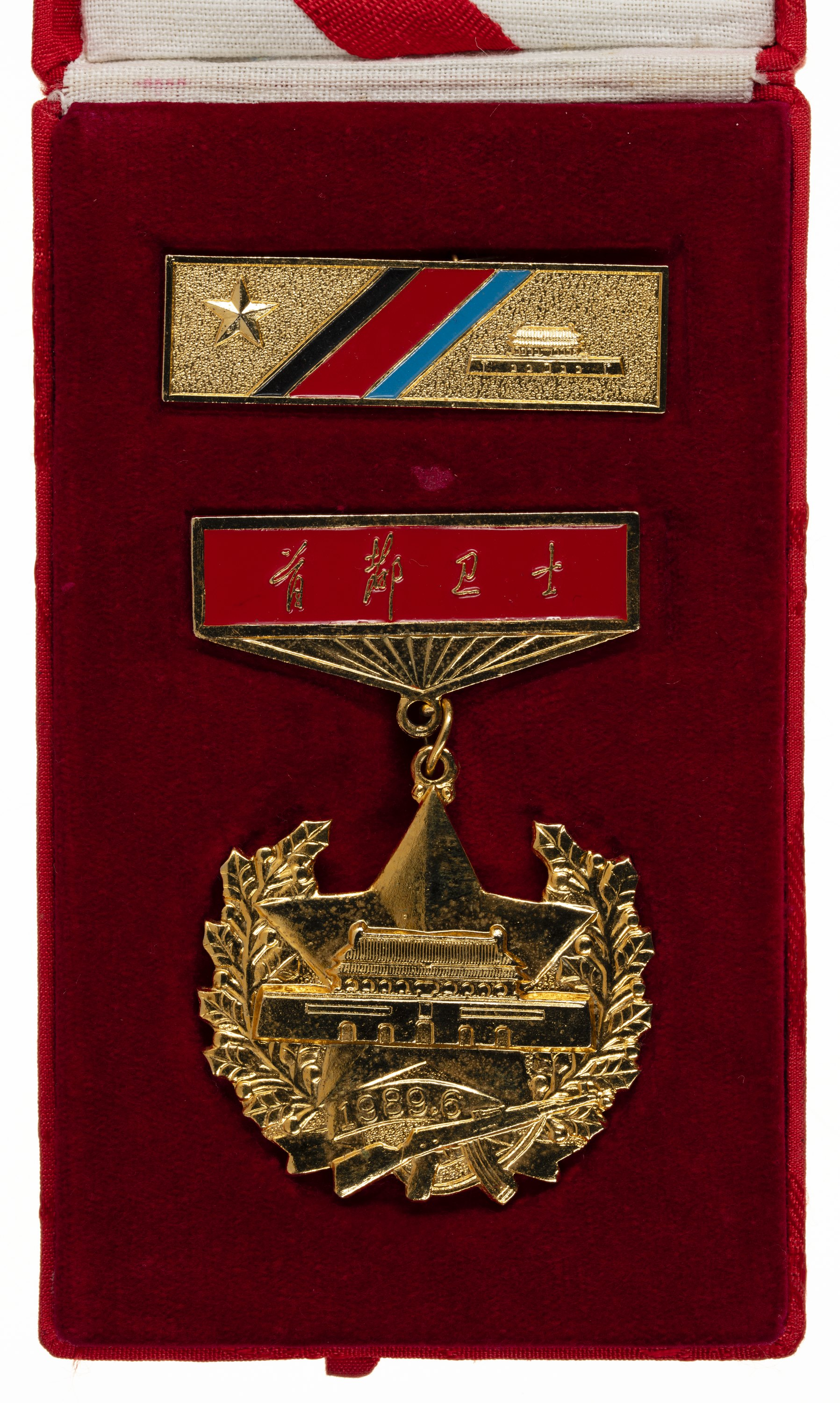
Guardian of the Capital Medal presented by the Central Military Commission to troops who took part in the enforcement of martial law.

=== Rumors ===
In the days after June 4, rumors spread among Beijing residents that the 27th Army committed the most brutal atrocities while the 38th Army was friendly to the people. The 27th Army was believed to be led by Yang Shangkun's nephew and believed to be fanatically loyal to Yang. Its soldiers were described by residents as "illiterate 'primitives' who know only how to kill." Some soldiers were believed to have been drugged and been issued altered ammunition to increase injuries. There were reports of unprovoked shootings of unarmed civilians in the back without warning. and even reports of the 27th coercing other army troops to kill student protesters. Western media reported that the "27th Army [was] widely hated in Beijing."

There were also reports of standoffs between army units, especially the 27th. The 16th Army was said to be tasked with relieving the 38th, but wanted to do so with minimal force. The 27th, ignoring the 16th's plea, continued on violently towards Tiananmen Square. On June 6, 1989, United States officials confirmed reports involving shootings between the 16th and the 27th armies on the outskirts of Beijing. On June 7, the 38th Army was reportedly in a stand-off with the 27th and the 15th Airborne.

Another unit that rallied against the 27th was the 40th, which established good relations with the civilians along their cordoned area around the airport road. The civilians exchanged food and supplies and offered moral support to the 40th. Although many opposed the undisciplined 27th Army, none was as prominent as the 38th Army. Initially reluctant to obey orders to enter the city, the 38th was replaced by the 27th. However, after June 6 the 38th was sent back into Beijing to relieve the 27th from their occupied posts. Some residents of Beijing welcomed back their beloved troops and regard "The 38th Army [as] the people's army!"

The rumors inspired residents in Shijiazhuang to protest outside the headquarters of the 27th Army. Officers and family members of the 27th were subject to scorn and ridicule in their home city.

In March 1990 a soldier on leave from the 38th army recounted his experience of suppressing the student demonstrations, claiming that his unit was tricked into opening fire on the protesters. During their approach to the square on the night of June 3 the soldier and his unit were unwilling to fire on the crowds blocking their path. They instead fired into the air to frighten protesters, and clear their route to the square. As the soldier's unit marched on, word was passed through the ranks that one hundred of their comrades had gone missing and were presumed to have been killed by the students. A count was conducted, and one hundred soldiers were confirmed missing. The soldiers were shaken by this incident, and became enraged with the protestors. Shortly afterwards the order to fire on the crowds was issued and obeyed to devastating effect. After contributing to the successful clearance of the square, the soldier's unit was engaged in cleanup operations. At this time the missing one hundred soldiers reappeared unharmed, having supposedly temporarily deserted their unit. The unidentified soldier had supposedly shared this story with his mother, and the rumor had spread from there, eventually reaching the ears of Pat Wardlaw, the then Consul General of the United States in Shanghai. Wardlaw comments that the source should not be taken a literal fact but instead as an example of the type of rumor circulating in China at the time.

=== Deng Xiaoping's praise for the Army ===
On June 9, Deng Xiaoping made his first public appearance since the beginning of the protests in a speech thanking and praising army's enforcement of martial law. Party organizations organized citizens to study the contents of the speech. He denounced the protests as a counterrevolutionary rebellion to overthrow the party-state, which fully justified the use of force. The demonstrators' complaint about official corruption masked their ulterior motive. The steadfastness of the army, the "great wall of iron and steel" of the party and country, Deng said, had "made it relatively easy" to "handle the present matter". He named 12 soldiers who died in the action "martyrs" and recognized 13 others as "Guardians of the Republic".

Martial law was lifted on January 11, 1990.

=== Military education and training in China ===
After the student movement was suppressed, the State Education Commission of China implemented a year-long military training for the freshmen of Peking University and Fudan University in the military academies.

=== Outcomes for PLA personnel ===
==== Results of Insubordination ====
During the Tiananmen repression an estimated 3,500 PLA officers disobeyed orders, In the days after June 4, Western media reported army officers being executed and generals facing court martial, though the executions have not been confirmed. In 1990, the military leadership reshuffled commanders throughout all seven military regions down to the division level to ensure loyalty. There has not been insubordination within the PLA to such an extent in the years since.

General Xu Qinxian of the 38th Army, who refused to enforce martial law, was removed from power, sentenced to five-years imprisonment and expelled from the party. Xu Feng, Commander of the 116th Division, 39th Army, who refused to lead his troops into the city on June 3, was demoted. The entire 28th Army, which refused to obey orders at Muxidi, was ordered to undergo six months of reorganization. General He Yanran, commander of the 28th Army was court-martialed, and along with political commissar Zhang Mingchun and chief of staff Qiu Jinkai, were disciplined, demoted and reassigned to other units.

==== Promotions ====
Military officers who carried out orders vigorously were rewarded with recognition and promotion. Liu Huaqing, the commander of the martial law forces became the vice-chairman of the Central Military Commission in 1990, and eventually gained a seat on the Politburo Standing Committee. Chi Haotian, the deputy commander, became Minister of Defense in 1993. Liang Guanglie, the commander of the 20th Army, who succeeded Chi as the PLA's chief of staff in 1992, eventually ascended to the position of Minister of Defense in 2008. Ai Husheng, who led the 347th Regiment to Tiananmen Square while the rest of the 116th Division under Xu Feng defied martial law orders, enjoyed a series of promotions. Ai took command of the Division in 1995 and then the entire 39th Army in 2002. In 2007, he became chief of staff of the Chengdu Military Region.

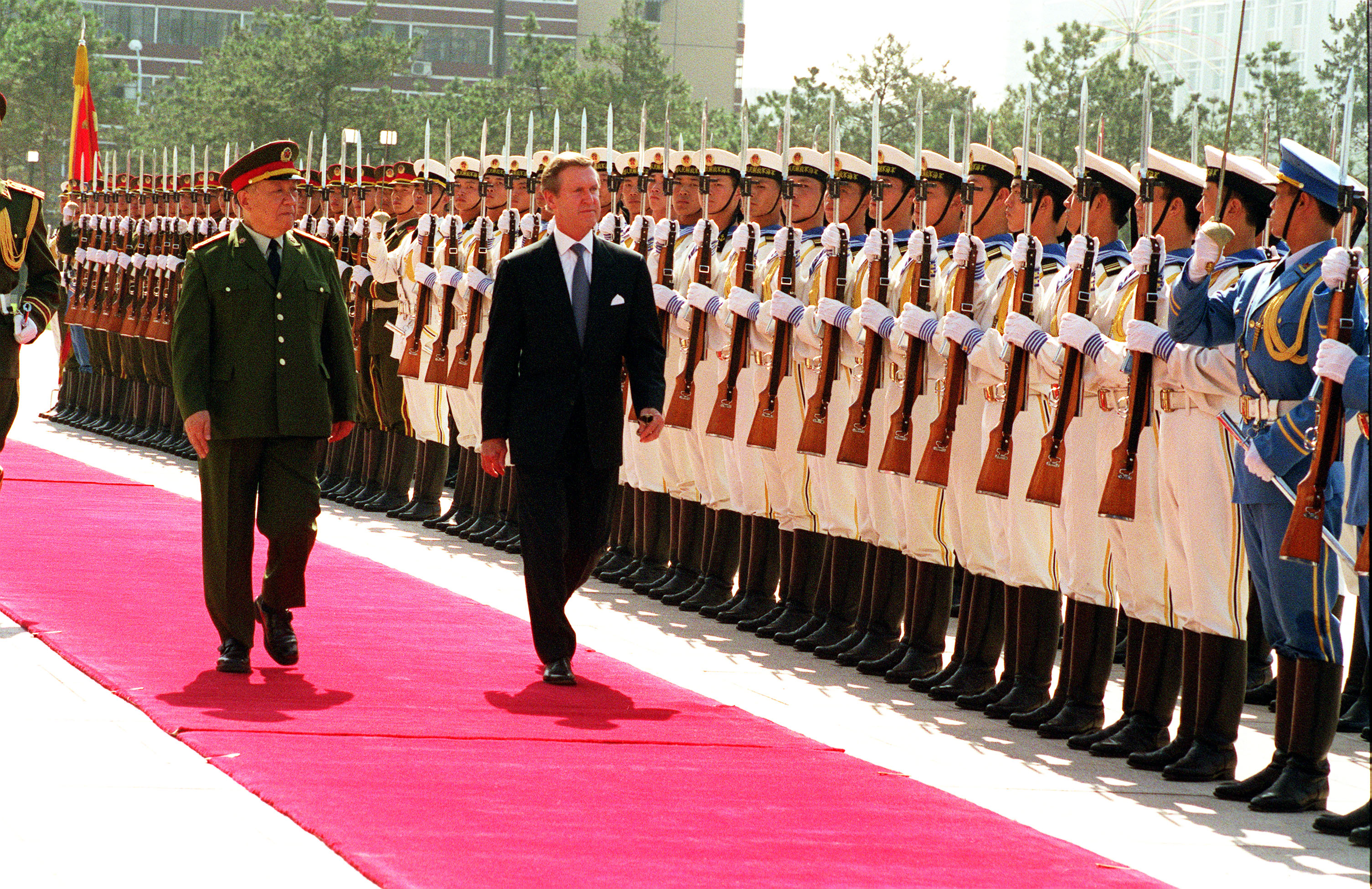
Chi Haotian, who was the deputy commander of the martial law forces, became the Minister of Defense in 1993. Pictured here with U.S. Secretary of Defense William Cohen in Beijing in 2000.

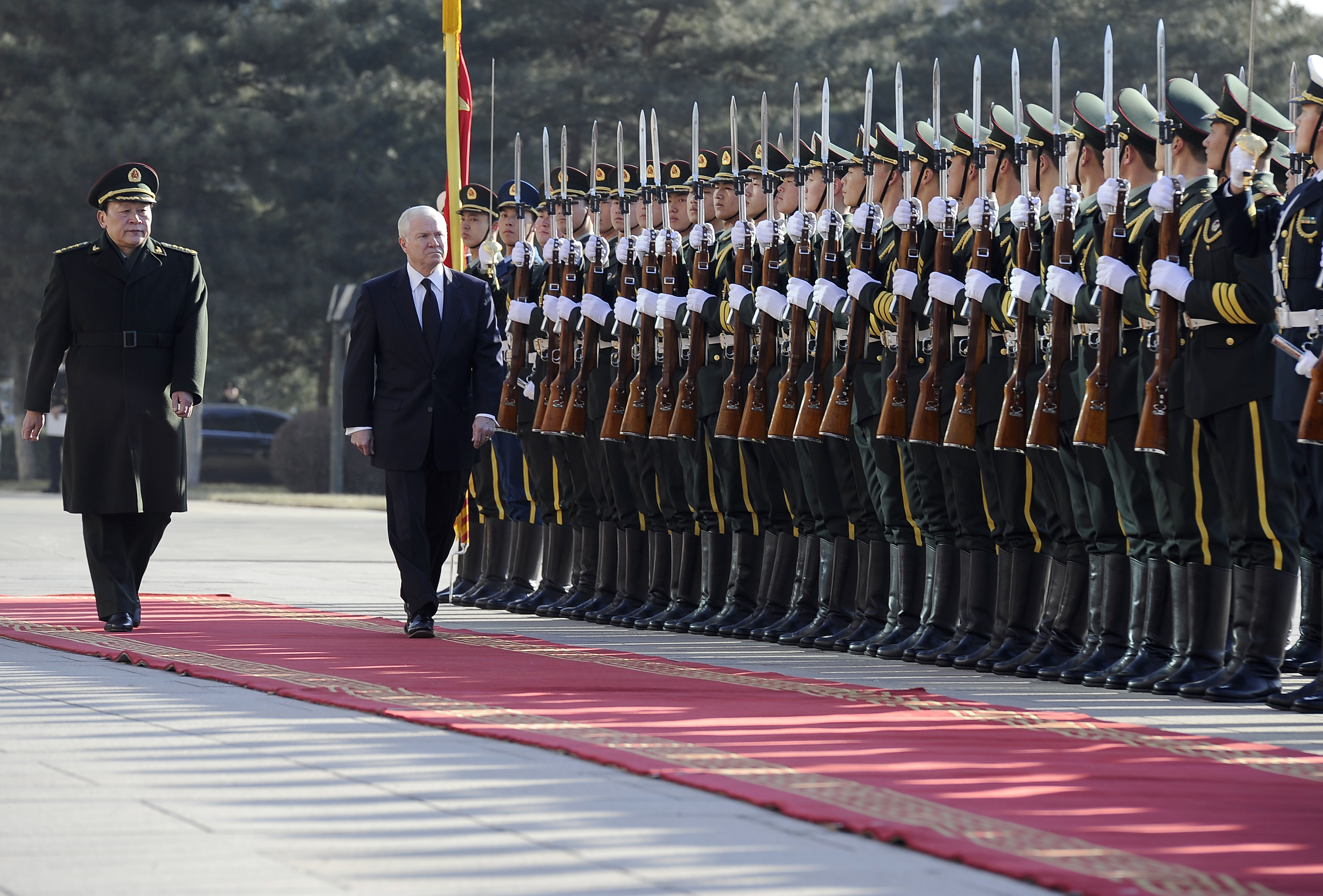
Liang Guanglie, who commanded the 20th Army during martial law operations, enjoyed a series of promotions in the decades after. He became the PLA's chief of staff in 1992 and Minister of Defense in 2008. Pictured here with U.S. Secretary of Defense Robert Gates in Beijing in 2011.

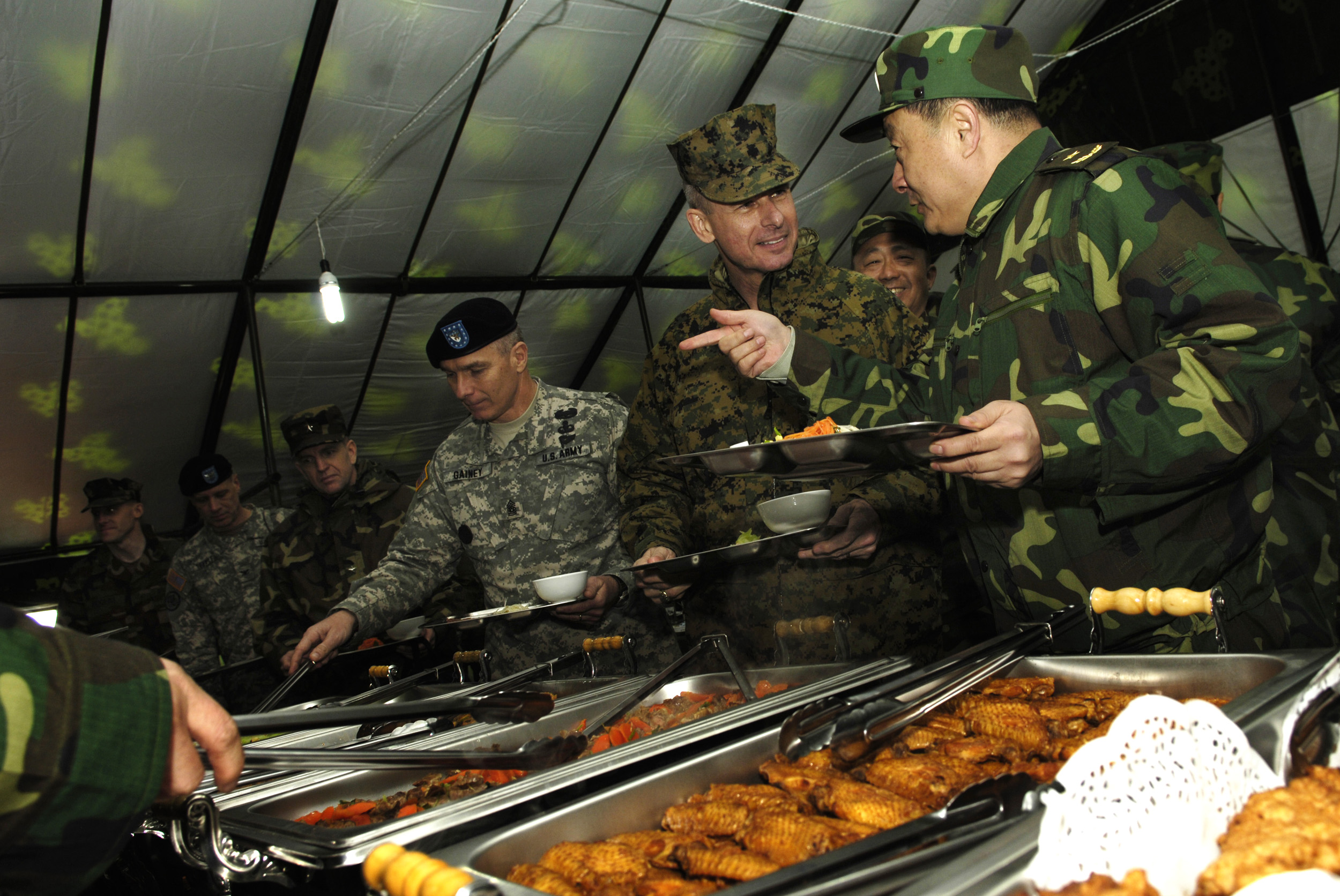
Ai Husheng, who led the 347th Regiment to Tiananmen Square while the rest of the 116th Division defied martial law orders, took command of the Division in 1995 and then the entire 39th Army in 2002. Pictured here on March 24, 2007 with U.S. Chairman of the Joint Chiefs of Staff Peter Pace in Shenyang.
