= Xiao Ke =

Chinese general (1907–2008)

- 萧克
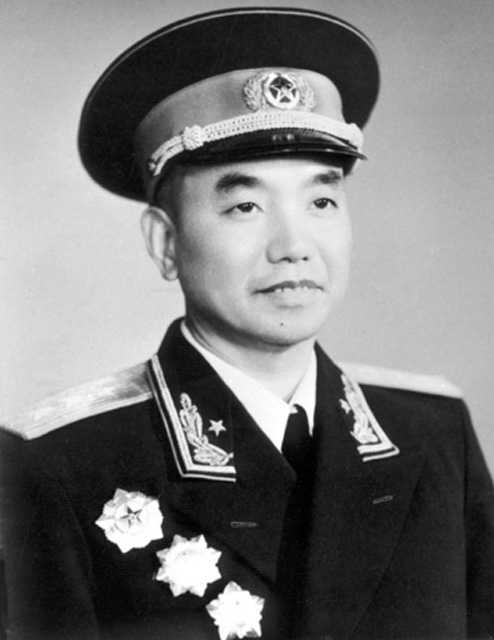
- Xiao Ke in 1955

Vice Chairman of the Chinese People's Political Consultative Conference
- In office 12 September 1980 – 17 June 1983
- Chairman: Deng Xiaoping

Personal details
- Born: July 14, 1907 Jiahe County, Hunan Province, Qing Empire
- Died: October 24, 2008 (aged 101) Beijing, China
- Party: Chinese Communist Party
- Occupation: General, politician, author
- Awards: Order of Bayi (First Class Medal); Order of Independence and Freedom (First Class Medal); Order of Liberation (China) (First Class Medal); Mao Dun Literature Prize

Military service
- Allegiance: People's Republic of China
- Branch/service: People's Liberation Army Ground Force
- Years of service: 1926–1983
- Rank: General
- Commands: Sixth Army Group
- Battles/wars: Encirclement Campaigns, Long March, 2nd Sino-Japanese War, Chinese Civil War

Xiao Ke (simplified Chinese: 萧克; traditional Chinese: 蕭克; pinyin: Xiāo Kè; July 14, 1907 – October 24, 2008) was a general of the Chinese People's Liberation Army, former vice chairman of the CPPCC, as well as principal of the University of Military and Politics.

== Biography ==
=== Early life ===
Xiao was born in Jiahe County, Hunan Province of China.

He joined the National Revolutionary Army and participated the Northern Expedition in 1926. He joined the Chinese Communist Party in 1927 and fought in Nanchang Uprising. He went to Jinggangshan and was recruited to the Red Fourth Army.

=== War time ===
Between 1930 and 1933, he was appointed first to command of the Red Army's Fifth Division, then its Eighth Army, and later Sixth Army Group, fighting in many battles resisting the Nationalist's Encirclement Campaigns. In August 1934, he led the Sixth Army Group out west of the Jiangxi Soviet as pathfinders for what was to become the Long March. Among his unit was future major general Li Zhen. The Sixth Corps subsequently joined forces under He Long to become the Second Front Army. They co-founded Xiang-E-Chuan-Qian Soviet District. In July 1936, he was appointed to deputy command of the Second Front Army.

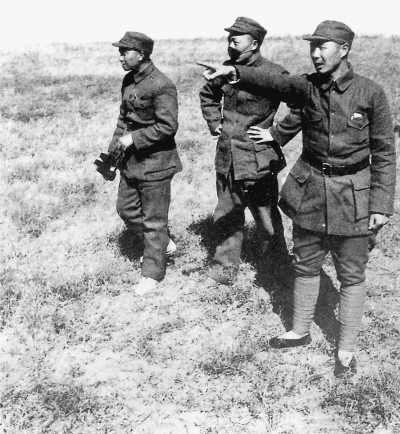
Xiao Ke, left, with Nie Rongzhen and Yang Chengwu near the front lines during the Chinese Civil War in 1947.

Following the outbreak of the Second Sino-Japanese War, Xiao was appointed second-in-command of the 120th division of the famous Eighth Route Army, deputy commander of the Jin-Cha-Ji Military Region and commander of Ji-Re-Liao Military Region. He was made a Lieutenant General in the National Revolution Army of the Republic of China.

In April 1949, he was promoted to become chief of staff of the Fourth Field Army, leading them into battle in Hengbao, Guangdong, and Guangxi and elsewhere.

=== People's Republic of China ===
After the 1949 declaration of the People's Republic of China, Xiao was appointed director of the military training department under Central Military Commission. In November 1954, he was appointed deputy director of the training supervision department and director of battle training.

On September 27, 1955, he was made a full general of PLA, ranking first on the list of Generals. Xiao had both the military record and experience to be appointed a Grand General due to his past honor and experience. Instead, he was awarded general, though ranked No.1. This was probably because he used to support Zhang Guotao, who wanted to found another central communist government, and he did not get along very well with He Long in the past.

In 1957, he was promoted to the director of training superintendence department as well as the secretary of CCP's committee there.

In 1958, Xiao came under political attack for so-called "dogmatism", and was dismissed from all posts. This attack was led by then Minister of Defense Peng Dehuai, soon to have political troubles of his own following the Lushan Conference. Reflecting in later years on the struggles he was subjected to, Xiao wrote, "I had been in the Party more than thirty years…had taken part in the Northern Expedition, the Nanchang Uprising, the Southern Hunan Uprising, the Struggle in Jinggangshan, the Long March… The man can be struck down, but his history will stand." Some years later, Peng sent his nephew to apologise to Xiao for the treatment the latter had received. Xiao himself was magnanimous, realising Peng's actions had been dictated by the tenor of the times.

In January 1972, he was appointed principal of the University of Military and Politics, made deputy minister of defence, principal of military academy and a first political commissar.

In September 1980, he was appointed one of the vice chairmen of the Fifth National Political Consultative Conference.

During the Tiananmen Square protests of spring 1989, Xiao Ke joined recently retired Minister of Defense Zhang Aiping and five other retired generals in opposing the enforcement of martial law by the Army in Beijing.

Due to the exigent circumstances, we as old soldiers, make the following request: Since the People's Army belongs to the people, it cannot stand against the people, much less kill the people, and must not be permitted to fire on the people and cause bloodshed; to prevent the situation from escalating, the Army must not enter the city.

— Ye Fei, Zhang Aiping, Xiao Ke, Yang Dezhi, Chen Zaidao, Song Shilun and Li Jukui, May 21, 1989 letter to the Central Military Commission and Capital Martial Law Command Headquarters

=== Personal life and works ===
Xiao was married to public relations worker Jian Xianfo, who gave birth to their son, Baosheng, on the Long March.

In 1991, Xiao Ke played a central role in creating the influential liberal journal Yanhuang Chunqiu in China. The journal was able to publish articles on sensitive topics with the support of Xiao and other high-ranking liberal officials such as Xi Zhongxun and Zhang Aiping.

General Xiao was also a noted author. He wrote a fictionalised account of his experiences leading the Sixth Red Army Group in a breakout of the Nationalist's Fifth Encirclement Campaign, Bloody Heaven (浴血罗霄), for which he was awarded the prestigious Mao Dun Literature Prize. His other works include the book Sidelights on the Red Army of Zhu & Mao (朱毛红军侧记).

He died in Beijing on the morning of October 24, 2008. Despite several English news sources giving his age at the time of his death as 102, according to all Chinese news sources, he was actually 101.
