= Song Shilun =

Chinese general

- 宋时轮
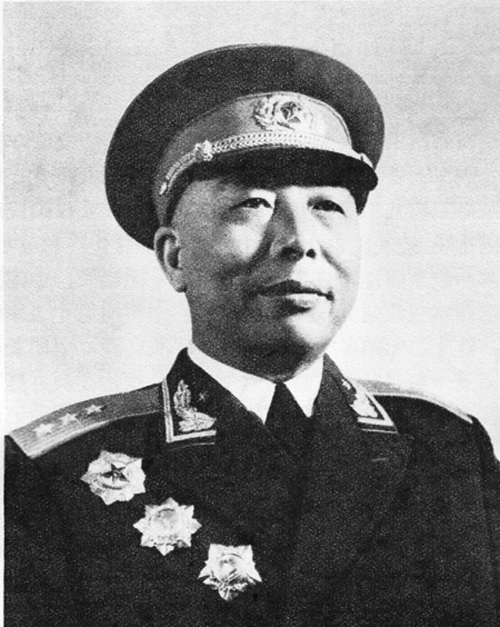
- Song in 1955

President of the PLA Academy of Military Sciences
- In office October 1972 – November 1985
- Preceded by: Ye Jianying
- Succeeded by: Zheng Wenhan

Personal details
- Born: September 1, 1907 Liling County, Hunan, Qing China
- Died: September 17, 1991 (aged 84) Shanghai, China
- Party: Chinese Communist Party
- Spouse: Zheng Xiaocun
- Education: Republic of China Military Academy

Military service
- Allegiance: People's Republic of China
- Branch/service: National Revolutionary Army; Chinese Workers' and Peasants' Red Army; Eighth Route Army; People's Liberation Army Ground Force
- Years of service: 1919–1985
- Rank: General
- Battles/wars: Chinese Civil War; Long March; Second Sino-Japanese War; Second World War; Korean War; Battle of Chosin Reservoir
- Awards: Order of Freedom and Independence (1st Class Medal) (1951); Order of the National Flag (1st Class Medal) (1953); Order of August 1 (1st Class Medal) (1955); Order of Independence and Freedom (1st Class Medal) (1955); Order of Liberation (1st Class Medal) (1955)

Chinese name
- Simplified Chinese: 宋时轮
- Traditional Chinese: 宋時輪
Transcriptions
Standard Mandarin
- Hanyu Pinyin: Sòng Shílún
- Wade–Giles: Sung Shih-lun

Song Shilun (Chinese: 宋时轮; pinyin: Sòng Shílún; Wade–Giles: Sung Shih-lun; September 1, 1907 – September 17, 1991), né Song Jiyao (宋际尧, named from Chinese legendary King Yao), was a Chinese general in the People's Liberation Army. He graduated from Whampoa Military Academy and participated in the Chinese Civil War, Second Sino-Japanese War, Second World War and the Korean War.

== Second Sino-Japanese War (1937–1945) ==
Song commanded the 716th Regiment of the 358th Brigade of the Eighth Route Army's 120th Division at the beginning of the Second Sino-Japanese War. In September 1937, he participated in operations north of the Yanmen Pass and was appointed commander and commissar of the North Yanmen detachment. In less than a month, he managed to recapture several villages and threatened Japanese control over the important railway juncture of Datong. This action was highly praised by the Eighth Route Army high command.

In May 1938, the North Yanmen detachment merged with the Deng Hua detachment to form the 4th column, with Song as commander with 5,300 men. He then launched an attack on the Japanese-controlled East Hebei Autonomous Government and captured the cities of Yanqing, Yongning, Sihai, and Xinglong. He subsequently launched the East Hebei Uprising by mobilizing local civilians and the forces under his command quickly exceeded 100,000 men and controlled most of East Hebei. However, because the mobilized forces received little training, it was quickly repulsed by a Japanese counterattack and forced to retreat west of Beiping. The Central Military Commission commended Song for his achievements, reporting that "Song and Deng's column reached deep into East Hebei for several months, fomented a rebellion in coordination with local party elements, restored Chinese administration in the area, established an operation zone with the help of the masses, expanded our army's influence far behind enemy lines, and dealt damage to the enemy. It can be said that there was achievement."

Song returned to Yan'an in 1940 and received further training at the Central Party School.

== Chinese Civil War ==
Song joined Chen Yi in Shandong in September 1945 and served as chief of staff of the local formations. He was appointed to operational commander of the Executive Headquarters Peiping in January 1946 and assisted Ye Jianying in negotiating with nationalist military representatives. During this period, he successfully resolved several skirmishes between communist and nationalist forces and escaped an assassination attempt. After the outbreak of the Second Chinese Civil War, he served as chief of staff of the communist Shandong Field Army, but was removed from command after suffering a defeat in Si County. He was then appointed deputy commander of the Bohai Military District, then was promoted to commander of the 10th column of the East China Field Army and defeated Qiu Qingquan in a blocking action during the Battle of East Henan. He continued to lead the 10th column in the Battle of Jinan and Huaihai Campaign. During the latter, he and Liu Shanpei commanded the 7th, 10th, and 11th columns and successfully intercepted attempts by Qiu Qingquan and Li Mi to relieve the encirclement of Huang Baitao, thus ensuring that Huang's force would be fully annihilated.

In 1949, the East China Field Army was reorganized into the Third Field Army, and Song was promoted to commander of the 9th Army. He participated in the Yangtze River Crossing Campaign and the 27th Corps under his command was one of the first communist formations to penetrate the nationalist defenses along the Yangtze River. He then encircled 7 nationalist corps and destroyed 5 in the area of Langxi and Guangde. In May 1949, Song participated in the Shanghai Campaign and subsequently served as commander of the Shanghai garrison.

== Korean War ==
During the Korean War, Song commanded the People's Volunteer Army 9th Army. His armies fought against the US Army 31st Regimental Combat Team and the 1st Marine Division at the Chosin Reservoir in November–December 1950. He and the 9th Army later participated in the Chinese spring offensive. He returned to China in 1952.

== Subsequent career ==
Song was the President of the PLA's Academy of Military Science.

In 1980, China adopted a new Military Strategic Guideline that envisioned using a combined arms approach and positional warfare to defend against a potential invasion by the Soviet Union. In Song's view the Soviet Union's nuclear arsenal would not give it significant leverage over China, because China's less urbanized population meant that there would be fewer strategic targets for Soviet nuclear weapons.

=== Reaction to the government's response to the Tiananmen Square protests ===
During the Tiananmen Square protests of spring 1989, Song joined former minister of defense Zhang Aiping and five other retired generals in opposing the enforcement of martial law by the Army in Beijing.

Due to the exigent circumstances, we as old soldiers, make the following request: Since the People's Army belongs to the people, it cannot stand against the people, much less kill the people, and must not be permitted to fire on the people and cause bloodshed; to prevent the situation from escalating, the Army must not enter the city.

— Ye Fei, Zhang Aiping, Xiao Ke, Yang Dezhi, Chen Zaidao, Song Shilun and Li Jukui, May 21, 1989 letter to the Central Military Commission and Capital Martial Law Command Headquarters

== Notes ==
Military offices
| New title | Commander of the Shanghai Garrison Command; 1949–1955 | Succeeded by Guo Huaruo |
| Preceded by Chen Geng | President of the PLA General Senior Infantry School; 1952–1957 | Succeeded by Yao Zhe |
| Preceded by Ye Jianying | President of the PLA Academy of Military Sciences; 1972–1985 | Succeeded by Zheng Wenhan |
