= Muxidi station =

Beijing Subway Line 1 and Line 16 station

Muxidi 木樨地
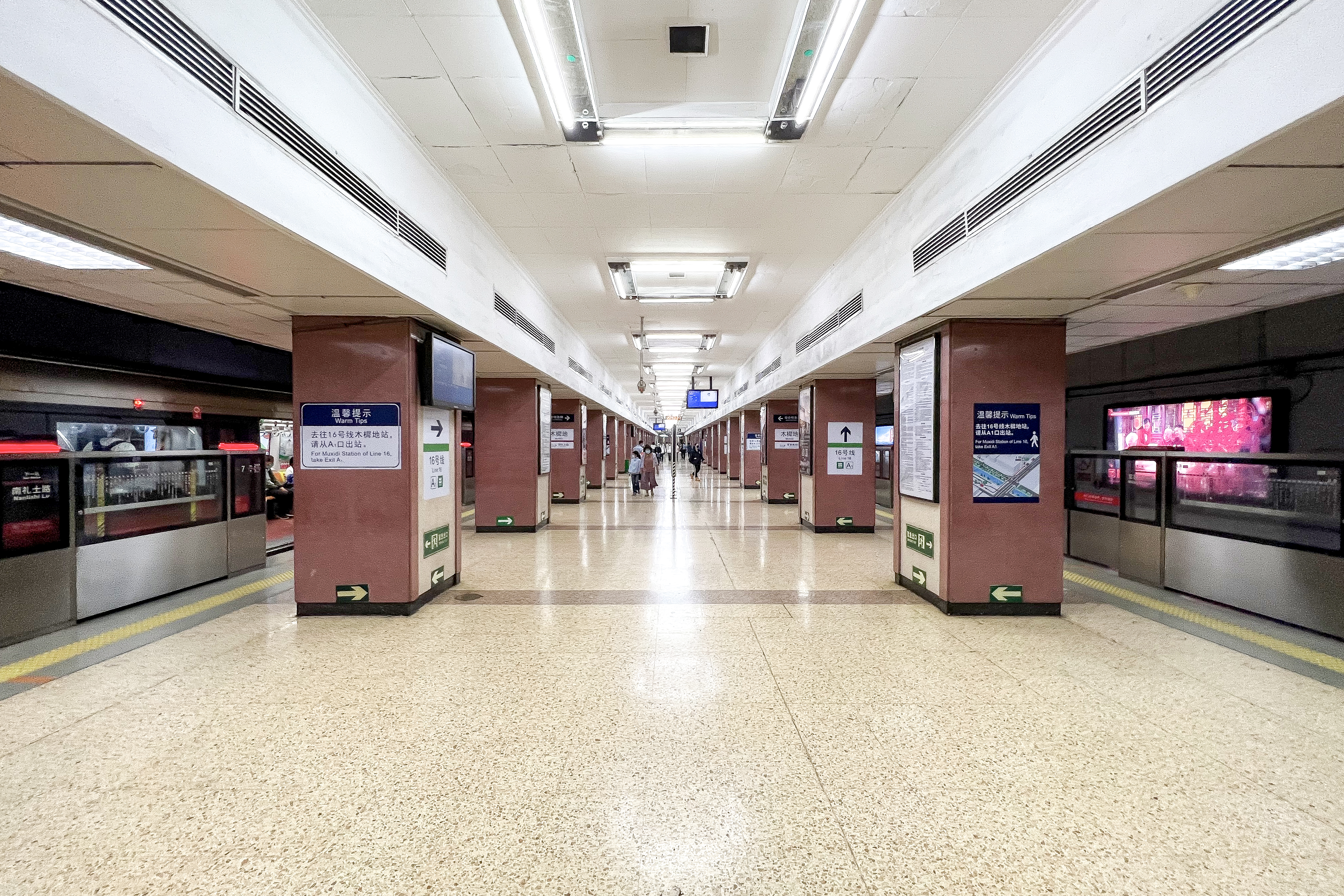
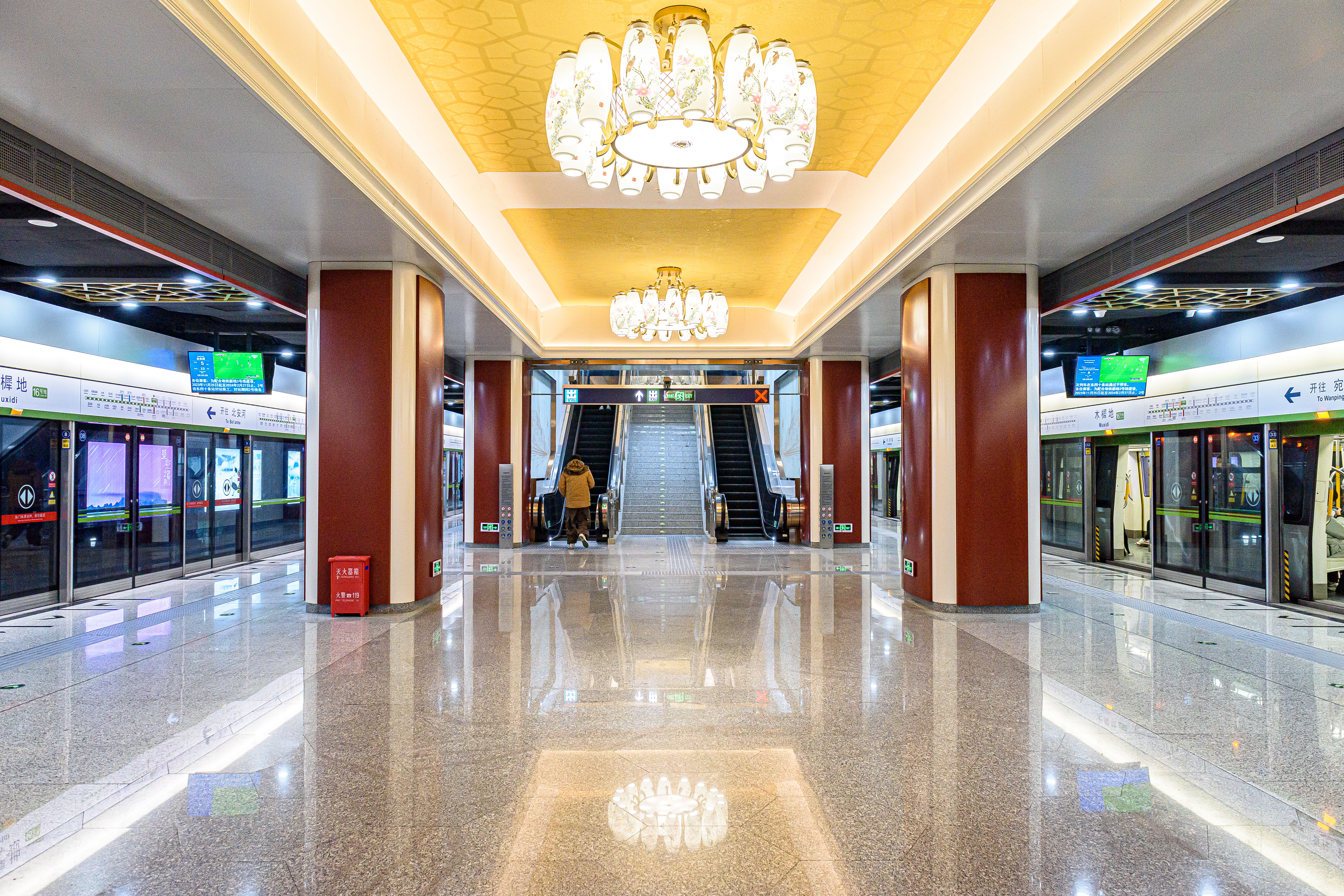
- Line 1 platform Line 16 platform

General information
- Location: Fuxing Road at Muxidi Bridge; Xicheng District, Beijing, China
- Coordinates: 39°54′27″N 116°20′15″E
- Operator: Beijing Mass Transit Railway Operation Corporation Limited
- Lines: Line 1; Line 16
- Platforms: 4 (2 island platforms)
- Tracks: 4

Construction
- Structure type: Underground
- Accessible: Yes

Other information
- Station code: 112 (line 1)

History
- Opened: Line 1: January 15, 1971; 55 years ago; Line 16: December 31, 2022; 3 years ago

Services
Preceding station	Beijing Subway	Following station
Military Museum towards Pingguoyuan	Line 1	Nanlishi Lu towards Universal Resort
Yuyuantan Dongmen (Yuyuantan Park East Gate) towards Bei'anhe	Line 16	Daguanying towards Wanpingcheng
Location
- Location within Beijing

Muxidi Station (Chinese: 木樨地站; pinyin: Mùxīdì Zhàn) is a station on Line 1 of the Beijing Subway. The Line 16 station opened on December 31, 2022, and currently serves as an out-of-system interchange (OSI) with Line 1.

== Station layout ==
Both the Line 1 station and Line 16 stations have island platforms.

== Exits ==
There are 10 exits, lettered A1, A2, B1, B2, C1, C2, D1, D2, E and F. Exits D1 and E are accessible.

== Gallery ==
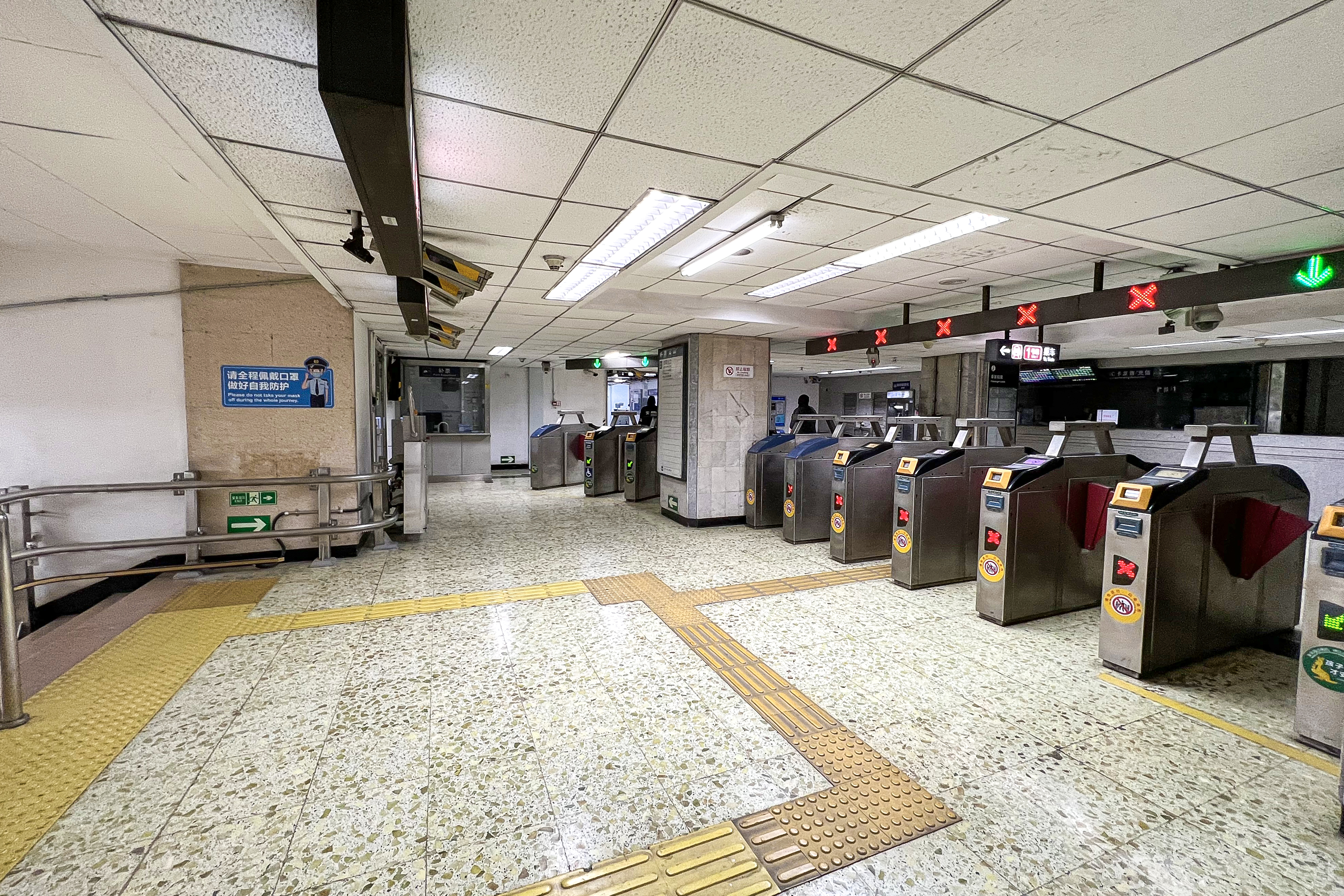
Line 1 west concourse

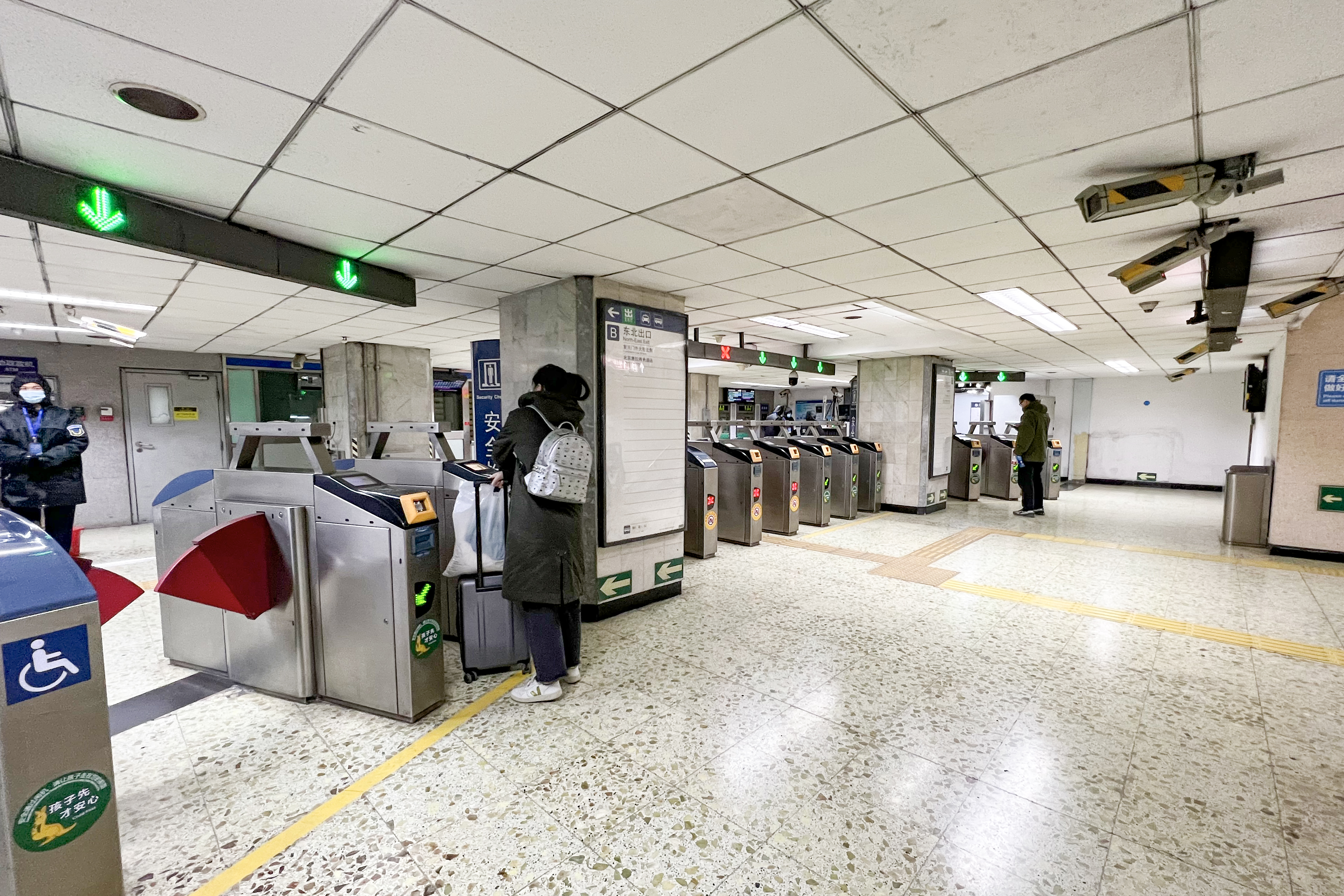
Line 1 east concourse

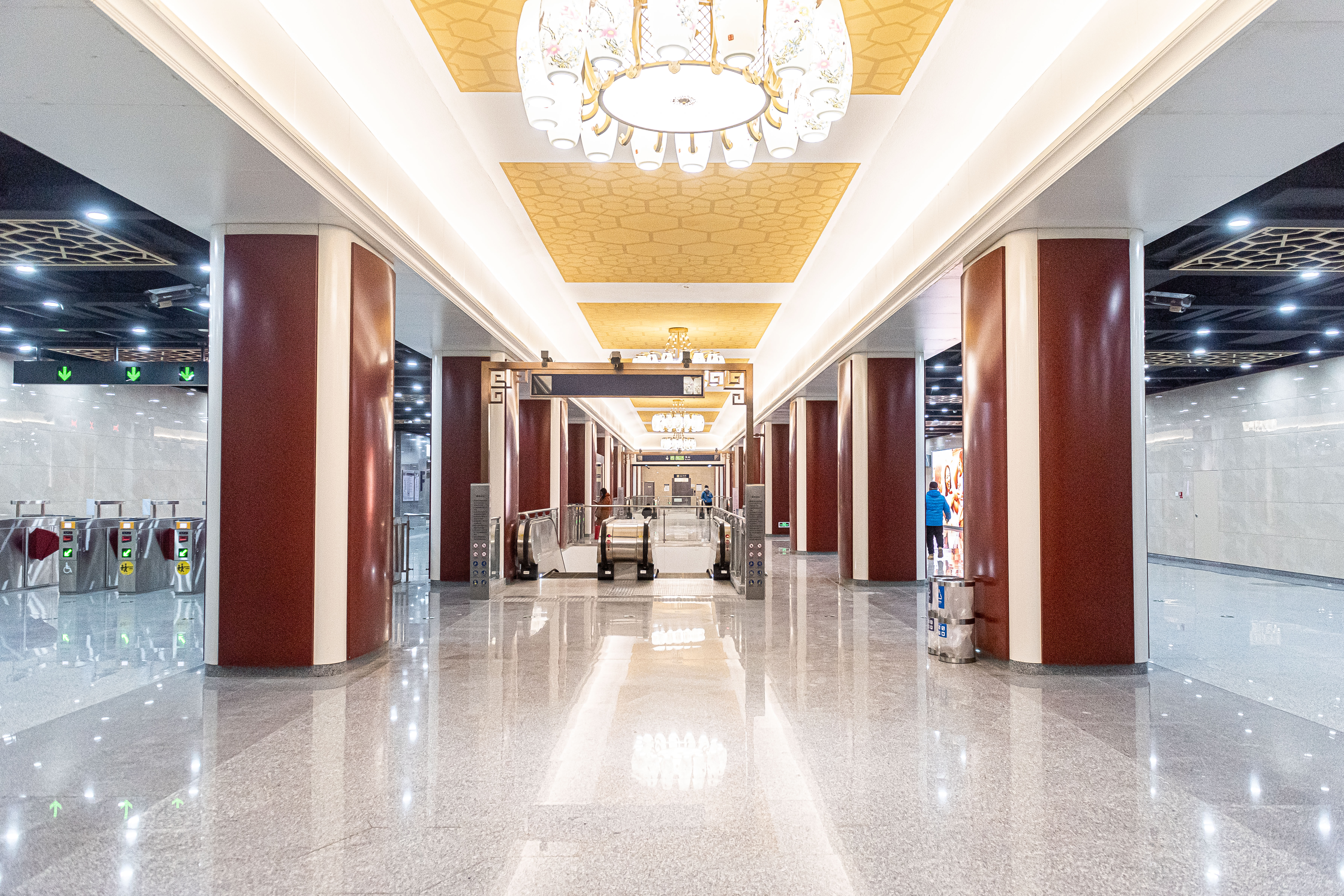
Line 16 concourse

== Suspension of service in early June ==
During troop movements in the Tiananmen Square protests of 1989, many people were killed at Muxidi. Muxidi Station is often suspended about June 4 these years. For example:

- On June 3, 2013, Exit A1 of Muxidi Station was closed on the grounds of repair.
- On June 2, 2014, Beijing Subway declared that Exits A1 and A2 of Muxidi Station would be closed from June 3 (Tuesday) to a future date via Weibo.
- On June 2, 2015, Beijing Subway declared that it would close its doors again. Reporters from Ming Pao found that they couldn't reply to Weibo posts and other replies are invisible.
- On June 3, 2016, Beijing Mass Transit Railway Operation Corporation Limited declared that Exits A1 and A2 would be closed from 15:00 (June 3) to a future date via Weibo. This message can not be replied to.
- On June 3, 2017, Exits A1 and A2 were closed. Beijing Mass Transit Railway Operation Corporation Limited didn't post any message but made a station broadcast on the grounds of "Temporary construction".
- On June 1, 2018, Beijing Mass Transit Railway Operation Corporation Limited declared that Exits A1 and A2 would be closed from June 3, 2018, at 12:00 to the last train of Muxidi Station via Weibo.
- On June 2, 2019, Beijing Mass Transit Railway Operation Corporation Limited declared that Exits A1 and A2 will be closed from June 3 at 10:00 to a future date via Weibo.
- The station exits weren't closed in early June 2020. Reporters of Now News noticed that there were plainclothes police, but fewer than before, stationed around the station.

Chinese activist Hu Jia believes that the meaning of these measures is to prevent Tiananmen Mothers members from eulogizing the dead during the protest.
