= Guardian of the Capital =

Military award in China

Guardian of the Capital 首都卫士
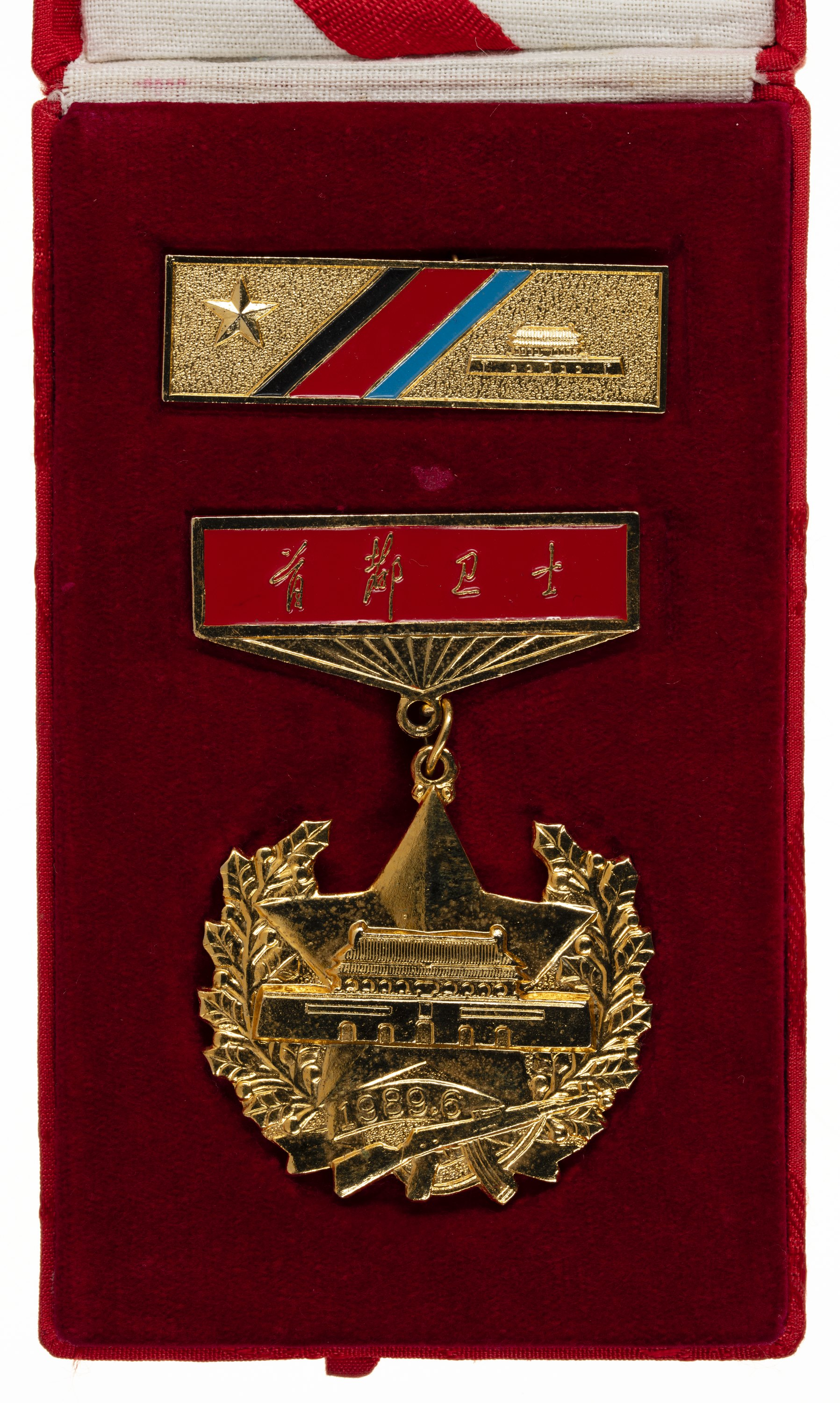
- Guardian of the Capital Medal
- Type: Military awards and decorations
- Country: China
- Eligibility: Soldiers of the People's Liberation Army's capital martial law troops
- Established: 20 May 1989

The Guardian of the Capital is a set of commemorative medals and commemorative albums awarded by the People's Liberation Army to officers and soldiers of the capital's martial law troops during the 1989 Tiananmen Square protests and massacre.

== History ==
After the 1989 Tiananmen Square protests and massacre, the Central Military Commission and the General Political Department of the People's Liberation Army decided to award the Guardian of the Capital commemorative medal and commemorative album to all officers and soldiers of the Capital Martial Law Troops. At the same time, Chairman of the Central Military Commission Deng Xiaoping also wrote the inscriptions Guardian of the Republic and Guardians of the Capital for the Capital Martial Law Troops. On August 1, more than 1,000 officers and soldiers of a certain unit of the Capital Martial Law Troops lined up in Tiananmen Square to hold a ceremony to award the Guardian of the Capital commemorative medal.

As the government of the People's Republic of China now prohibits any discussion of the 1989 protests, the Guardian of the Capital medal has also become a forbidden topic. On March 18, 2024, the People's Liberation Army Rocket Force released a short video on Bilibili, in which a female soldier showed off the Guardian of the Capital medal her father received after participating in a mission related to the 1989 protests. This sparked public discussion, and the Rocket Force officials quickly deleted the video. On December 7, 2024, a treasure appraisal anchor named Wang Yuegang showed a medal with the words Guardian of the Capital in his latest treasure appraisal live video. However, shortly after the medal appeared on the screen, Wang Yuegang's live broadcast room was immediately blocked.

== Description ==
According to the People's Daily, the Guardian of the Capital commemorative medal is made of gold-plated copper and is divided into a main medal and a minor medal. The Guardian of the Capital commemorative album is a hardcover 25-mo edition with an inscription by Deng Xiaoping printed on the cover. The album contains excerpts from Deng Xiaoping's speech when he met with the capital's martial law troops, the Guardian of the Capital commemorative medal pattern, a map of the People's Republic of China, and a world map.
