= Chen Zaidao =

Chinese general (1909–1993)

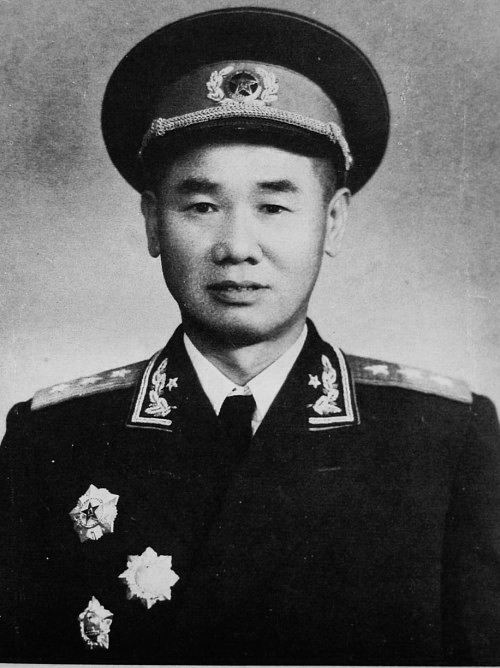
Chen Zaidao

Chen Zaidao (simplified Chinese: 陈再道; traditional Chinese: 陳再道; pinyin: Chén Zàidào, 24 January 1909 – 6 April 1993) was a Chinese general in the People's Liberation Army. Following the establishment of the Second United Front against Japan, Chen, then Deputy Commander of the Eighth Route Army's 386th Brigade, was given the official rank of Major General by the National Revolutionary Army. After the Communist victory in the Civil War, he was awarded the rank of Colonel General (1955). Chen commanded the Wuhan Military Region from 1954 to 1967 and is most noted for having arrested pro-Mao Xie Fuzhi and Wang Li during the Wuhan Incident in July 1967. He was promptly dismissed after the incident, but was rehabilitated in 1972 and entered the Central Committee of the Chinese Communist Party in 1978.

During the Tiananmen Square protests of spring 1989, Chen Zaidao joined former Minister of Defense Zhang Aiping and five other retired generals in opposing the enforcement of martial law by the Army in Beijing.

Due to the exigent circumstances, we as old soldiers, make the following request: Since the People's Army belongs to the people, it cannot stand against the people, much less kill the people, and must not be permitted to fire on the people and cause bloodshed; to prevent the situation from escalating, the Army must not enter the city.

— Ye Fei, Zhang Aiping, Xiao Ke, Yang Dezhi, Chen Zaidao, Song Shilun and Li Jukui, May 21, 1989 letter to the Central Military Commission and Capital Martial Law Command Headquarters

== See also ==
- List of officers of the People's Liberation Army

Military offices
New title	Commander of the Henan Military District; 1949–1955	Succeeded by Bi Zhanyun
Preceded by Wang Shusheng	Commander of the Hubei Military District; 1955–1956	Succeeded by Han Dongshan
New title	Commander of the Wuhan Military District; 1955–1967	Succeeded by Zeng Siyu
Preceded by Wu Kehua	Commander of the People's Liberation Army Railway Corps; 1977–1983	Succeeded by Position revoked
