= Li Jukui =

Chinese general

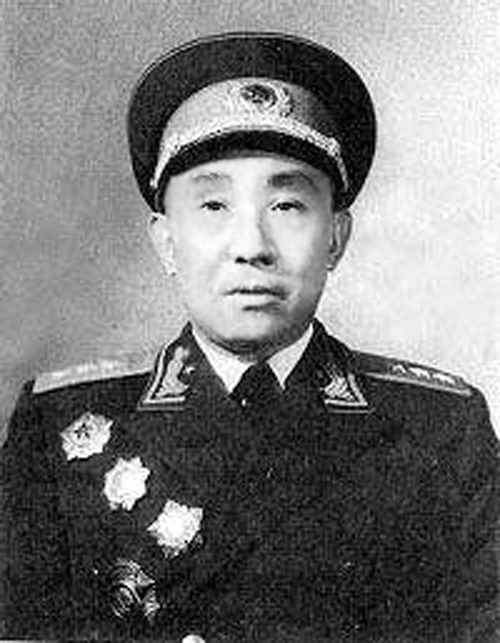
Li Jukui

Li Jukui (Chinese: 李聚奎; 1904–1995) was a Chinese general and politician. He was the Petroleum Industry Minister from 1955 to 1958. Li Jukui served as the president of the Logistics Institute of the PLA.

== Background ==
Li came from a destitute peasant family in rural Hunan. He was mostly illiterate.

== Career ==
Li joined the Communist Revolution together with Peng Dehuai in 1928. He participated in the Long March.

Li served as the People's Republic of China's first Minister of the Petroleum Industry. He was replaced on February 11, 1958 by Yu Qiuli. The change was made at the recommendation of Peng Dehuai, who was then the Secretary of Defense.

== Opposition to army crackdown in Tiananmen Square ==
During the Tiananmen Square protests of spring 1989, Li Jukui signed a letter opposing the enforcement of martial law by the Army in Beijing.

Due to the exigent circumstances, we as old soldiers, make the following request: Since the People's Army belongs to the people, it cannot stand against the people, much less kill the people, and must not be permitted to fire on the people and cause bloodshed; to prevent the situation from escalating, the Army must not enter the city.

— Ye Fei, Zhang Aiping, Xiao Ke, Yang Dezhi, Chen Zaidao, Song Shilun and Li Jukui, May 21, 1989 letter to the Central Military Commission and Capital Martial Law Command Headquarters
