= Guardian of the Republic =

Military award in China

- Native name: 共和国卫士
- Description: Honorary title and medal conferred upon military personnel who participated in the events surrounding the 1989 Tiananmen Square protests
- Country: China
- Presented by: State Council and the Central Military Commission

The Guardian of the Republic (Chinese: 共和国卫士) is an honorary title awarded by the then Premier Li Peng and Chairman of the Central Military Commission Deng Xiaoping to military personnel who had made contributions or were seriously injured or died in the during the Tiananmen Square massacre on June 4, 1989.

== Conferred recipients and medal ==
There were 37 Guardians of the Republic: 15 deceased and 22 alive, awarded in five batches. The recipients received a bronze medal with the five characters "Guardian of the Republic" written in Deng Xiaoping's handwriting. The government of the People's Republic of China also produced a documentary and book with the same title, describing the process of quelling. In addition, those who participated or were slightly injured were given some anonymous small souvenirs, such as watches given to frontline personnel by the Beijing Municipal Government.

== List of the posthumous recipients ==
Historian Wu Renhua compiled the following list of the deceased among the Guardians of the Republic:

1. Liu Guogeng, second lieutenant platoon leader, 1st Platoon, 4th Company, 2nd Battalion, 63rd Army Group Signal Regiment;
2. Wang Qifu, squad leader of the radio communications squad of the 5th Battalion Headquarters of the 38th Army Group Artillery Brigade;
3. Li Qiang, a soldier from the 1st Squad, 2nd Company, 5th Battalion, Artillery Brigade of the 38th Army Group;
4. Du Huaiqing, a soldier from the 3rd Squad, 2nd Company, 5th Battalion, Artillery Brigade of the 38th Army Group;
5. Li Dongguo, deputy squad leader of the 4th Squad, 2nd Company, 5th Battalion, Artillery Brigade of the 38th Army Group;
6. Wang Xiaobing, a soldier from the 4th Squad, 2nd Company, 5th Battalion, Artillery Brigade of the 38th Army Group;
7. Xu Rujun, squad leader of the wired communications squad of the 3rd Company, 5th Battalion, Artillery Brigade of the 38th Army Group;
8. Cui Guozheng, a soldier from the 2nd Howitzer Company, Artillery Battalion, 347th Infantry Regiment, 116th Infantry Division, 39th Army Group;
9. Ma Guoxuan, acting platoon leader of the 6th Company, 2nd Battalion, Artillery Regiment, 127th Infantry Division, 54th Army Group;
10. Wang Jinwei, Lieutenant, Combat Staff Officer, Logistics Department, 486th Infantry Regiment, 162nd Infantry Division, 54th Army Group;
11. Li Guorui, a soldier from the communications squad of the 1st Battalion, 2nd Detachment, Beijing Municipal Corps of the Armed Police Force;
12. Liu Yanpo, a soldier from the 1st Squadron, 1st Battalion, 1st Detachment, Beijing Municipal Corps of the Armed Police Force;
13. Yu Ronglu, propaganda officer of the Political Department of the 39th Army Group, with the rank of major;
14. Zang Lijie, a soldier from the 7th Company, 3rd Battalion, 345th Infantry Regiment, 115th Infantry Division, 39th Army Group;
15. Wang Jingsheng is the platoon leader of the 3rd Platoon, 1st Company, 1st Battalion, 210th Infantry Regiment, 70th Infantry Division, 24th Army Group.

The time and place of death of these 15 military police officers are as follows:

Liu Guogeng, platoon leader of the 63rd Army Group of the People's Liberation Army, died at around 4 a.m. on June 4, 1989, about 150 meters east of the Xidan intersection on West Chang'an Avenue.

Six soldiers from the 38th Army Group, Wang Qifu, Li Qiang, Du Huaiqing, Li Dongguo, Wang Xiaobing, and Xu Rujun, died at around 1:10 a.m. on June 4, 1989, at the intersection of Cuiwei Road, which is an extension of West Chang'an Avenue to the west. They were burned to death when their truck overturned and caught fire. According to the People's Daily, the truck the 4th Company was riding in was hit by a rain of bricks and stones when it reached Cuiwei Road in the early morning of June 4, and the 38 people on board were engulfed in flames. Wang Qiang, the security officer in the front seat, directed the rescue and was called the "Guardian of the Republic."

Cui Guozheng, a soldier of the 39th Army Group, died at around 4:40 a.m. on June 4, 1989, near the Chongwenmen Overpass (located in Chongwen District, Beijing) south of Tiananmen Square.

Ma Guoxuan, acting platoon leader of the 54th Army Group of the People's Liberation Army, was seriously injured near Caishikou in Xuanwu District, Beijing at around 1 a.m. on June 4, 1989. He was sent to the Armed Police Force Hospital but died after failed rescue efforts.

Wang Jinwei, a lieutenant staff officer of the 54th Army Group, died at 4:30 a.m. on June 4, 1989, on Nanxinhua Street in Xuanwu District, Beijing.

Li Guorui, a soldier of the Beijing Corps of the People's Armed Police Force, was seriously injured at the Fuchengmen Interchange in Xicheng District, Beijing, at around 5 a.m. on June 4, 1989. He was sent to Beijing People's Hospital but died after failed rescue efforts.

Liu Yanpo, a soldier of the Beijing Municipal Corps of the People's Armed Police Force, was seriously injured at the Xidan intersection on West Chang'an Avenue at around 1 a.m. on June 4, 1989. He was sent to Beijing People's Hospital but died after failed rescue efforts.

Yu Ronglu, a major officer of the 39th Army Group, died at around 2 o'clock on June 4, 1989. The place of death is unknown.

On June 7, 1989, Zang Lijie, a soldier of the 39th Army Group of the People's Liberation Army, was riding in a military vehicle with his companions passing by Jianguomen in Dongcheng District, Beijing, when he was hit in the face by a bullet fired from a diplomatic apartment and died on the spot.

Wang Jingsheng, a platoon leader of the 24th Army Group of the People's Liberation Army, died suddenly of illness while on patrol on July 4, 1989.

== List of Award Recipients ==
Grant batch	Grantee	Granting Unit	Time awarded
1st	63rd Army: Liu Guogeng, 38th Army: Wang Qifu, Li Qiang, Du Huaiqing, Li Dongguo, Wang Xiaobing, Xu Rujun, 39th Army: Cui Guozheng, 54th Army: Ma Guoxuan, Wang Jinwei	Central Military Commission	June 30, 1989
2nd	Li Guorui ( 2nd Detachment of Beijing Armed Police Corps ); Liu Yanpo ( 1st Detachment of the Beijing Armed Police Corps )	State Council/Central Military Commission	July 18, 1989
3rd	Yu Ronglu, Zang Lijie, Zhao Yongming, Li Bo, Wang Qiang, Liao Kaixi, Zhang Zhen, An Weiping, Shen Yuntian, Yu Aijun, Zhou Jiazhu, You Degao	Central Military Commission	July 27, 1989
4th	Wang Yuwen, Wang Zhiqiang, Jiang Chaocheng	State Council/Central Military Commission	September 22, 1989
5th	Wang Jingsheng, Liu Jialin, Liu Geyun, Yang Rongya, Li Shucun, Ge Mingjun, Fu Yong, Zhong Zhenqing, Le Licheng, Yuan Huarong	Central Military Commission	February 11, 1990

== Books and movies ==
In July 1989, the August 1st Film Studio produced a four-part news documentary, Flying the Flag of the Republic, compiled by the General Political Department of the Chinese People's Liberation Army, as a tribute to the 40th anniversary of the founding of the People's Republic of China. In 1990, the film won the "Junma Award" for the Outstanding Short Film Crew of the First National Film Studio Outstanding Photography Group. This documentary is sometimes referred to as "Guardians of the Republic".

The People's Liberation Army Publishing House published the book Guardians of the Republic in August 1989 and the book Songs of the Republic’s Guardians: Collection of Reportage Literature on Martial Law Troops’ Heroic Deeds in the Capital (共和国卫士之歌：首都戒严部队英模事迹报告文学集) in October of the same year.

The film Flying the Flag of the Republic and the book Songs of the Republic’s Guardians notably praises the army as heroes for their actions during the 1989 Tiananmen Square protests and massacre. Songs of the Republic’s Guardians includes 15 short stories on sixteen “Republic’s Guardians”. Many writers of the stories are also members of China Writers Association, which is state-controlled. In Doing Things with Words in Chinese Politics, Michael Schoenhals noted that Songs of the Republic’s Guardians uses repeated phrases and character types portray protesters as ignorant crowds, "thugs" as violent instigators, and soldiers as restrained defenders.
