= Chinese Alliance for Democracy =

Chinese pro-democracy organization

- Founded: November 18, 1983
- Type: NGO
- Location: New York, U.S.

The Chinese Alliance for Democracy (Chinese: 中国民主联盟; pinyin: Zhōngguó Mínzhǔ Liánméng) is a non-governmental organization founded in New York by Chinese dissidents led by Wang Bingzhang in 1983.

The C.A.D became a key part of the 1989 pro-democracy protests in China and advocated for political liberalization, human rights, and democratic reforms.

== History ==
The CAD was formed in New York City in December 1983 by Chinese dissidents, with Wang Bingzhang as their leader. Wang was sent study abroad in McGill University in October 1979 to pursue a medical PhD.

In 1982, Wang established China Spring, the first pro-democracy Chinese magazine overseas, becoming one of its first leaders alongside Hu Ping. The magazine's popularity grew significantly, eventually leading to the founding of the CAD in 1983. 53 delegates from Europe, Australia, Japan, Hong Kong, Taiwan and China travelled to New York to commemorate the founding of CAD.

The early membership of CAD consisted of Chinese international students, as well as pro-Kuomintang (KMT) elements in Chinatowns, including overseas Chinese elites who suffered under the Chinese Communist Party (CCP) after 1949. They received significant support through associations and newspapers from the KMT government in Taipei, who viewed it as a part of an overseas civil war against the CCP in Beijing.

=== 1989 Tiananmen Square protests ===
The CAD played a significant role in assisting student campaigns during the Tiananmen Square protests in 1989. In April, Hu Ping and Liu Xiaobo wrote an "An Open Letter to Chinese University Students" calling for demonstrators to consolidate and capitalize on their gains and work hard to promote freedom on their campuses. Despite infighting within the CAD leadership, the activists were able to mobilize their branches to provide assistance to students, with some CAD members returning to China to support them. Yang Wei, a member of CAD returning from the US, led a student organization in Shanghai from May to June in support of the demonstrations in Beijing. Many of the protests' leaders including Wu'er Kaixi had been inspired by China Spring, which was published via the organization.

=== Post-Tiananmen ===
In the wake of the military crackdown in June, there was a mass exodus of dissidents from Beijing and other places where protests took place, helping the growth of the overseas democracy movement. CAD expanded its membership drastically, with about 3,000 members by the end of 1989, similar to the Federation for a Democratic China (FDC), another overseas democracy NGO. According to Wang Min, the first deputy president of CAD, they and FDC together had a total of some 7,000-8,000 members by 1993. The National Endowment for Democracy (NED) provided systematic support for these exile organizations, setting up the Foundation of Human Rights and Democracy in China (FHRDC) in September 1989 to channel funding to FDC, CAD, and other organizations linked to the overseas Chinese democracy movement.

In 1993, there was a proposal to merge the FDC and the CAD into a single organization. The conference to complete the merger and elect its leadership was held in Washington DC in January, but the merger soon fell into power struggles and legal battles between the two groups. The infighting destroyed the confidence of the Western and Taiwanese backers of both organizations, and Taipei soon stopped funding to CAD, opting to only continue funding its China Spring magazine instead. Similarly, NED declined to provide further grants to all parties involved in the 1993 infighting.

== See also ==
- Hong Kong Alliance in Support of Patriotic Democratic Movements of China
- Tiananmen Mothers
- Human Rights in China (organization)
- June 4th Museum
- June 4th Memorial Association
