= HKSAR v Hong Kong Alliance in Support of Patriotic Democratic Movements of China =

2026 Hong Kong national security case

- Judiciary of Hong Kong
- Court: Court of First Instance
- Full case name: Hong Kong Special Administrative Region v Hong Kong Alliance in Support of Patriotic Democratic Movements of China, Lee Cheuk-yan and Chow Hang-tung
- Decided: 21 August 2026
- Citation: [2026] HKCFI 4794
- Transcript: text

Case history
- Prior actions: HKSAR v Chow Hang Tung [2024] HKCFI 1735; HKSAR v Chow Hang Tung [2025] HKCFI 629; HKSAR v Chow Hang Tung [2026] HKCFI 398; HKSAR v Chow Hang Tung [2026] HKCFI 1341

Court membership
- Judges sitting: Alex Lee Wan-tang; Johnny Chan Jong-herng; Anna Lai Yuen-kee

HKSAR v Hong Kong Alliance in Support of Patriotic Democratic Movements of China [2026] HKCFI 4794 is a Hong Kong national security case in which the Court of First Instance convicted the Hong Kong Alliance in Support of Patriotic Democratic Movements of China (the Alliance), Lee Cheuk-yan and Chow Hang-tung of incitement to subversion under Articles 22 and 23 of the Hong Kong national security law (NSL). Albert Ho, who had been jointly charged with them, pleaded guilty on the first day of trial.

The prosecution centred on one of the Alliance's Five Action Agendas, "end one-party dictatorship". It particularised the alleged "unlawful means" as ending the leadership of the Chinese Communist Party (CCP) in breach of the Constitution of the People's Republic of China, particularly its Preamble and Article 1. The court held that CCP leadership was an integral element of the socialist system established by Article 1 as China's "fundamental system", and that overthrowing or undermining CCP leadership was therefore equivalent to overthrowing or undermining that fundamental system for the purposes of Article 22.

Applying HKSAR v Yeung Suet Ying Clarisse & Ors [2026] HKCA 284, the court held that "other unlawful means" were not confined to violence, threats of violence or independently criminal conduct. Conduct in breach of the Constitution, undertaken with a view to overthrowing or undermining the fundamental system, could fall within Article 22. The court found that "end one-party dictatorship" meant ending the CCP's constitutional leadership status and that Lee and Chow intended to incite others to pursue that objective by unlawful means. It nevertheless held that the prosecution had not proved its alternative allegation that ending CCP leadership would necessarily overthrow the "body of central power" of the People's Republic of China.

The case received substantial international attention because the Alliance had organised Hong Kong's annual candlelight vigils commemorating the 1989 Tiananmen Square protests and massacre for decades, and because the court expressly found that the Alliance had never used or advocated violence or the threat of violence. Sentencing remained outstanding, with mitigation adjourned to 28 August 2026.

== Background ==
The Alliance was established in May 1989 during the Tiananmen protests and was registered in Hong Kong as a company limited by guarantee the following month. It became best known for organising the annual 4 June vigil at Victoria Park.

The Alliance promoted five objectives which it called its Five Action Agendas: "release pro-democracy activists", "reverse verdict on 1989 pro-democracy movement", "investigate liability for massacre", "end one-party dictatorship", and "construct a democratic China". Lee testified that the five agendas had been maintained since their adoption and had to be read together. The Alliance used rallies, marches, talks, exhibitions, street booths, its website and social-media accounts, and the physical and online June 4th Museum to promote its activities and agendas.

In March 2018, Article 1 of the Constitution was amended to state that "[l]eadership by the Communist Party of China is the defining feature of socialism with Chinese characteristics". The effect of that amendment became central to the prosecution.

On 25 September 2021, Alliance members voted 41–4 at a special members' meeting to disband the organisation. On 26 October 2021, the Chief Executive in Council ordered the Registrar of Companies to strike the Alliance off the Companies Register under section 360C of the Companies (Winding Up and Miscellaneous Provisions) Ordinance. The corporate defendant was nevertheless prosecuted in HCCC 155/2022 and was represented at trial by senior counsel instructed by the Official Receiver.

== Charge and trial arrangements ==
The Alliance, Lee, Ho and Chow were jointly charged with one count of incitement to subversion contrary to Articles 22 and 23 of the NSL.

The indictment alleged that between 1 July 2020 and 8 September 2021, in Hong Kong, they incited others to organise, plan, commit or participate in acts by unlawful means with a view to subverting State power, namely:

1. overthrowing or undermining the fundamental system of the People's Republic of China established by the Constitution ("Prohibited Act (1)"); or
2. overthrowing the body of central power of the People's Republic of China ("Prohibited Act (2)").

In December 2022, the South China Morning Post reported that Secretary for Justice Paul Lam Ting-kwok had issued a certificate under Article 46 of the NSL directing that the case be tried without a jury. According to a letter disclosed by Chow, the stated grounds included the involvement of foreign factors, protection of jurors and their families, and a real risk that the due administration of justice could otherwise be impaired. Article 46 provides for such a case to be tried by a panel of three judges rather than a jury; Article 44 provides for the designation of judges to handle national-security cases.

== Pre-trial proceedings ==
=== Recusal application ===
Chow applied for Anna Lai J to recuse herself because Lai had previously heard an appeal arising from a separate prosecution of Chow and other Alliance office-bearers for failing to comply with a police information notice. Lai had been given access in that appeal to material over which public-interest immunity had been claimed. Chow argued that the earlier proceedings overlapped with the subversion case and that Lai's access to undisclosed material gave rise to apparent bias.

In HKSAR v Chow Hang Tung [2024] HKCFI 1735, the panel applied the test of whether a fair-minded and informed observer would conclude that there was a real possibility of bias. It unanimously dismissed the application. The court relied among other matters on the different offences involved, disclosure of edited public-interest-immunity material, reasons given in the earlier judgments and the fact that the present trial would be determined by three professional judges. It found no real possibility of apparent, including subconscious, bias.

=== Overseas witnesses ===
Chow sought permission under section 79I of the Criminal Procedure Ordinance for five witnesses outside Hong Kong to testify by live television link. After she had indicated her intention to make the application, the Safeguarding National Security Ordinance came into force in March 2024. Section 144 amended section 79I so that overseas live-link evidence could not be permitted in proceedings involving national security.

Chow challenged the amendment on equality and fair-trial grounds. In HKSAR v Chow Hang Tung [2025] HKCFI 629, the court held that the appropriate equality comparison was between prosecution and defence within the same national-security proceeding, rather than between litigants in national-security and ordinary criminal cases. Because the statutory bar applied equally to prosecution and defence, it found no differential treatment or inequality of arms.

The court further held that the amendment pursued the legitimate aims of safeguarding national security and the administration of justice, was rationally connected to those aims, went no further than reasonably necessary, and struck a reasonable balance between the social interest and the right to a fair trial. It rejected as speculation Chow's contention that the amendment had been enacted specifically to defeat her application. The application to call the overseas witnesses by live link was refused.

=== Application to quash indictment ===
Chow later sought to quash the indictment on four grounds: insufficient particulars; failure to disclose an offence known to law; duplicity; and abuse of process and double jeopardy.

In HKSAR v Chow Hang Tung [2026] HKCFI 398, the court held that the indictment, further particulars and prosecution opening gave the defendants sufficient information to know the case they had to meet. The prosecution had sufficiently identified the alleged unlawful means as ending CCP leadership in breach of the Constitution. It held that the prosecution did not have to plead the mens rea of incitement expressly in the particulars, and that whether the alleged objective could constitute the required criminal conduct was a matter for trial.

The court also rejected the duplicity argument, finding sufficient continuity for the alleged conduct to be charged as a single offence, and rejected the abuse-of-process and double-jeopardy arguments. All four grounds were dismissed, as was the alternative request for a permanent stay.

=== Expert evidence ===
Chow sought to call National Taiwan University sociologist Ho Ming-sho as an expert witness. The prosecution objected on grounds of relevance, expertise and alleged lack of independence or impartiality.

In HKSAR v Chow Hang Tung [2026] HKCFI 1341, the court held that several matters could be determined from the evidence, common sense and ordinary reasoning without expert assistance, and that an expert could not give evidence about the defendants' state of mind or intention. It held in particular that how an ordinary Hong Kong person would understand "end one-party dictatorship" in the relevant social context did not require expert evidence.

The court recognised Ho's academic standing but held that he was not an expert in Chinese constitutional law or Chinese law and that his expertise would not assist on the relevant legal issues. It rejected, however, the prosecution's submission that his previous criticism of the CCP was sufficient to demonstrate a lack of independence or objectivity. His evidence was excluded on relevance and expertise grounds.

== Trial ==
The trial was heard by three designated national-security judges, Alex Lee Wan-tang, Johnny Chan Jong-herng and Anna Lai Yuen-kee, at the West Kowloon Law Courts Building, sitting as the Court of First Instance. The hearing began on 22 January and concluded on 19 May 2026; the judgment lists 24 hearing days, and The Guardian likewise reported that the trial took place over 24 days. Ho pleaded guilty on the first day, while the Alliance, Lee and Chow pleaded not guilty. Lee and Chow had been detained since 2021.

The prosecution evidence included two sets of agreed facts and one live witness, Superintendent Chow Wing-yee, who was tendered for cross-examination by Lee. Lee and Chow both gave evidence in their own cases, and Chow called three additional defence witnesses.

=== Prosecution and defence cases ===
The prosecution argued that, following the 2018 constitutional amendment, the socialist system was expressly identified as China's fundamental system and CCP leadership as the defining feature of socialism with Chinese characteristics. It submitted that the natural and reasonable effect of "end one-party dictatorship" was to encourage an end to CCP leadership in breach of the Constitution. It also alleged that the defendants used subjects including the 4 June crackdown and democracy movements in mainland China to generate hostility towards State power and strengthen the effect of their incitement.

Lee and Chow maintained that the Alliance sought democratic change and popular sovereignty rather than simply the removal of the CCP. They argued that ending one-party dictatorship did not necessarily require unlawful means because the National People's Congress had power to amend the Constitution, that their activities were protected political expression, and that the Alliance had never advocated violence. They also maintained that they genuinely and honestly believed their words and conduct were lawful.

At the close of the prosecution case, Lee and Chow submitted that there was no case to answer. After three days of submissions, the court held that the prosecution had established a prima facie case requiring them to present their cases. The Alliance did not make a separate no-case submission, but the court recognised that a ruling favourable to Lee or Chow could also affect the case against the corporate defendant.

=== Co-conspirators' rule ===
During the prosecution case, the prosecution sought to rely on the co-conspirators' rule so that statements made by one individual defendant in nine post-NSL video recordings could be used as evidence against the other individual defendants.

The court held that the rule was not confined to prosecutions for conspiracy but also applied to "common enterprise offences". Before a statement could be cross-admitted, there had to be reasonable independent evidence linking the defendant to the alleged common plan, and the act or statement had to have been made in furtherance of that plan. Because the NSL was not retrospective, statements made before the NSL could not be admitted under the co-conspirators' rule, although they might be admissible for non-hearsay purposes.

The court found reasonable independent evidence linking the defendants to the alleged common enterprise. It held that a statement did not necessarily have to be made by a person formally speaking on behalf of the Alliance: the question was whether, in context, it supported and advanced the Alliance's "end one-party dictatorship" agenda and the alleged incitement. Seven of the nine recordings satisfied both admission criteria; two did not, although the latter remained admissible against their respective speakers.

When assessing the evidence at the end of trial, the court applied the cross-admitted statements in both directions. It gave weight to statements by Ho and Chow, together with Lee's own statements, in finding that Lee had actively participated in the common enterprise as a core Alliance member; it likewise gave weight to statements by Lee and Ho, together with Chow's own statements, in reaching the corresponding conclusion about Chow.

== Judgment ==
The court handed down its reasons for verdict on 21 August 2026. At the outset of its reasons, the court emphasised that the defendants were not on trial because of their political views or beliefs, and that the charge did not itself concern democracy, the 4 June events or criticism of the State. It also stressed that the NSL had no retrospective effect, as such words and conduct made before the enactment of the NSL were not the subject matter of the charge and could be considered only as background to the evidence concerning the charge period.

=== Elements of incitement to subversion ===
Relying on HKSAR v Yeung Suet Ying Clarisse & Ors [2026] HKCA 284, the court held that the substantive Article 22 offence required: the organisation, planning, commission of or participation in a prohibited act; the use of force, threat of force or other unlawful means; and a view to subverting State power. The first two were elements of the actus reus and the third required specific intent.

For incitement under Article 23, the court applied common-law principles of incitement. It held that the prosecution had to prove that the defendant instigated another person to commit, or caused another person to commit, one of the prohibited acts under Article 22, and that the defendant intended or believed that, if the incitee acted as instigated, the incitee would use force, threat of force or other unlawful means with a view to subverting State power. The incitee did not have to intend, prepare or ultimately commit the substantive offence.

The court held that a genuine and honest belief that conduct was lawful was not itself a defence to incitement, but could be evidentially relevant to whether the defendant possessed the required mens rea.

=== Other unlawful means ===
The court followed the Court of Appeal's interpretation in Yeung that "other unlawful means" were not restricted by the ejusdem generis rule to conduct analogous to force or threats of force, and were not confined to independently criminal acts. It held that conduct in breach of provisions of the Constitution, undertaken with a view to overthrowing or undermining the fundamental system, could constitute "other unlawful means" whether or not it involved violence, threats of violence or another criminal offence.

The court construed "overthrowing" a system as generally involving a radical and fundamental change produced by an extrinsic force which causes the system to lose its existing order or status; although such a result might occur suddenly, it could also result from a lengthy process. It construed "undermining" more broadly as causing damage or harm or acting in breach of something, and held that a system could be undermined without violence, including by sowing discord, creating division or causing people to lose confidence in it.

=== Territorial scope ===
The prosecution based its case on inciting acts carried out in Hong Kong and on audiences receiving the allegedly inciting material in Hong Kong. The court considered Articles 36 and 37 of the NSL, under which an offence is treated as committed in Hong Kong where either the act or its consequence occurs in Hong Kong, and the NSL also applies to offences committed outside Hong Kong by Hong Kong permanent residents and Hong Kong-established bodies.

The court held that, where an incitee was a Hong Kong permanent resident, the prosecution had to prove that the defendants intended or believed that the person would use force, threats or other unlawful means with the relevant subversive purpose, without a territorial restriction on where the incitee would act. For a non-permanent-resident incitee, the prosecution had to prove that the defendants intended or believed the relevant unlawful conduct would take place in Hong Kong. It emphasised that the prosecution did not allege that the defendants had incited Hong Kong or non-Hong Kong residents to travel to mainland China to commit unlawful acts.

=== Constitution and protected rights ===
Chow argued that the Constitution was not included in Annex III to the Basic Law and therefore did not have direct legal effect in Hong Kong. The court rejected that argument. It held that the Constitution was the fundamental law of the State rather than an ordinary "national law" of the kind contemplated by Article 18 of the Basic Law. It was legally superior to the Basic Law, supplied the constitutional basis for the creation of the HKSAR, and was the source of the National People's Congress's authority to enact the Basic Law.

The court concluded that the Constitution and Basic Law complement each other and together establish Hong Kong's constitutional order. It stressed, however, that not every provision of the Constitution applies directly in Hong Kong. Where provisions differed from the system specifically established for Hong Kong under "one country, two systems", the Basic Law governed; relevant provisions concerning the national constitutional order and fundamental system could nevertheless apply directly. It also held that it could apply the plain and obvious meaning of relevant constitutional provisions without expert evidence on Chinese constitutional law, while recognising that the formal power to interpret the Constitution belongs to the Standing Committee of the National People's Congress.

Chow further argued that the Constitution primarily regulated public power rather than imposing duties on ordinary citizens. The court disagreed, relying in part on Article 33 of the Constitution, and held that Article 22 of the NSL expressly made certain conduct directed against the constitutionally established fundamental system criminal.

The court expressly stated that it was not conducting a proportionality review of Articles 22 and 23, because the defence had not, and, as the court have said, could not, challenge their constitutionality. It nevertheless said that rights and rule-of-law values remained relevant to interpretation and fact-finding. It recognised freedom of expression, association and assembly under the Basic Law and the Hong Kong Bill of Rights, describing freedom of expression as a fundamental freedom at the core of civil society and Hong Kong's system and way of life, while also noting that expression and peaceful assembly are not absolute and may be subject to lawful restrictions including for national security and public order.

=== CCP leadership and the fundamental system ===
The court held that the Constitution's Preamble and Article 1 established the socialist system as China's fundamental system and CCP leadership as the defining feature of socialism with Chinese characteristics. It concluded that CCP leadership was therefore an integral element of the fundamental system, while other political parties participated in the patriotic united front under CCP leadership.

Lee and Chow argued that the relevant fundamental system was instead popular sovereignty under Article 2. The court rejected that contention, holding that Article 1 expressly identifies the socialist system as the fundamental system, while Articles 2 and 3 establish the people's congress system as the mechanism by which the people exercise State power. It concluded that, under the prevailing Constitution, overthrowing or undermining CCP leadership was equivalent to overthrowing or undermining the fundamental system within Article 22.

=== Body of central power ===
The court held that the "body of central power" in Article 22 included, but was not limited to, the National People's Congress and its Standing Committee, the President, the Central People's Government and the Central Military Commission.

It rejected, however, the prosecution's argument that ending CCP leadership would necessarily overthrow those institutions. Although the State bodies operated under CCP leadership, the constitutional text did not establish the precise structural and personnel relationship between the party and each institution, and the prosecution had adduced no expert or other evidence sufficient to establish the asserted necessary consequence. The court therefore treated Prohibited Acts (1) and (2) separately.

=== Assessment of evidence ===
The court accepted parts of Lee's and Chow's personal and historical evidence, but rejected central parts of their accounts concerning the meaning of "end one-party dictatorship", their attitudes towards the CCP and Central Government, and their claimed belief in the legality of continuing the Alliance's programme after the NSL came into force. In Lee's case, it expressly rejected the proposition that decades of police tolerance of Alliance activities could support a belief that the same conduct would not breach the newly enacted NSL.

In considering Chow's evidence, the court noted that she had attended Alliance-organised 4 June vigils with her mother from childhood and treated her experience as an example of the effect that the Alliance's speech and activities could have on participants.

=== Findings of fact and verdicts ===
After considering the defendants' public statements and the Alliance's work reports, website, social-media material, newsletters and materials related to the June 4th Museum, the court found that "end one-party dictatorship" was directed at the CCP. It held that the objective was not to require the CCP to return to the system of multiparty cooperation under the Constitution, but to end its constitutional leadership status, including its leadership within the system of multiparty cooperation and political consultation. It further found that "end" carried the meaning of overthrowing and undermining rather than a natural cessation.

The court found that Lee, Ho and Chow actively promoted that objective personally and as Standing Committee members, and that ordinary reasonable recipients would understand both the objective and the defendants' encouragement to put it into effect. It found that they did not regard constitutional amendment as a practicable means of achieving the objective during the charge period and did not genuinely and honestly believe their conduct after the enactment of the NSL was lawful.

The court acknowledged that Lee and Chow proposed no specific method or timetable and that the Alliance had never used or advocated violence or the threat of violence. It nevertheless found that the defendants continued to promote the agenda after the NSL came into force, encouraged others to persist in resistance and sought to erode confidence in CCP leadership by stirring hostility and division. The court held that continuation of an agenda which they understood to contravene the Constitution fell within "other unlawful means".

It further found that Lee, Ho and Chow intentionally encouraged supporters to wait for an appropriate opportunity to pursue the objective by unlawful means, and intended or believed that persons acting on their encouragement would use means contrary to the Constitution and NSL with a view to subverting State power. The court consequently held that Lee and Chow had committed the conduct and possessed the mens rea required for Prohibited Act (1). It however found Prohibited Act (2) to not have been proved beyond reasonable doubt.

=== Corporate liability ===
The court held that a corporation could be convicted of an offence requiring mens rea and noted that Article 31 of the NSL expressly contemplates criminal liability for companies, bodies and other organisations. Applying the doctrine of attribution, it asked whether particular natural persons constituted the corporation's "directing mind and will".

It found that Lee, Ho and Chow were members of both the Alliance's Standing Committee and board of directors and held the offices of chairman or vice-chairman. When they spoke and acted on "end one-party dictatorship" as Standing Committee members, they acted as the Alliance's directing mind and will, so their relevant acts and intentions were attributable to the corporate defendant. Lee and Chow were convicted after trial, and the Alliance was convicted through attribution; Ho had already been convicted on his guilty plea.

== Sentencing proceedings ==
Article 23 of the NSL provides that, where incitement to subversion is of a serious nature, the sentence is fixed-term imprisonment of between five and ten years; where it is of a minor nature, the available penalty includes fixed-term imprisonment of up to five years, short-term detention or restriction. Lee and Chow therefore faced a maximum sentence of ten years.

Following the verdict, the court adjourned the case to 28 August 2026 for mitigation. Sentences had not been imposed when the reasons for verdict were handed down.

== Reactions ==
=== Hong Kong government ===
Chief Executive John Lee Ka-chiu said after the verdict that the defendants' conspiracy was "abundantly clear" and that they had to be brought to justice. He accused the Alliance of planting hatred against the CCP and Central Government and inciting people to subvert State power. The government said the verdict had been reached according to law and evidence and rejected allegations of political interference.

Secretary for Security Chris Tang said the verdict had enabled justice to be done and described the Constitution as the fundamental law of the State and a central component of Hong Kong's constitutional order and "one country, two systems". Chief Superintendent Steve Li of the Hong Kong Police National Security Department said the case clarified that criticism itself was permissible, but that it must not amount to incitement or subversion of State power.

The Office for Safeguarding National Security said it supported the verdict, which it said demonstrated the spirit of the rule of law and upheld the authority of the NSL.

The Hong Kong government also responded directly to criticism of the proceedings. It said that, during the trial, "external forces" had repeatedly smeared the Judiciary, the Department of Justice and law-enforcement agencies, used misleading political rhetoric in an attempt to interfere with a fair trial, and made baseless attacks on Hong Kong's protection of rights and freedoms. It strongly condemned what it characterised as attempts to trample on the rule of law and reiterated that the verdict had been reached according to law and evidence without political considerations.

=== Defence supporters and rights groups ===
Lee's wife, Elizabeth Tang, called the verdict "most unjust" outside court and said she did not believe that Lee had committed unlawful acts. On the day of the verdict, Amnesty International described Lee and Chow as prisoners of conscience, said they had not committed a recognisable crime, and called for the convictions to be quashed and for their immediate and unconditional release.

=== International response ===
The United States, United Kingdom and European Union criticised the convictions and raised concerns about the use of national-security law against peaceful political expression and remembrance activities. France and Germany said they deeply regretted Chow's conviction and stated that peaceful human-rights advocacy was not a crime.

UK Indo-Pacific minister Rosie Winterton said the verdict showed that peaceful acts of remembrance were being treated as threats to national security and called for the NSL to be repealed. Reuters reported that diplomats from the European Union and United States were among foreign representatives who observed the proceedings.

== Significance ==
The court's principal constitutional holding was that relevant provisions of the PRC Constitution form part of the constitutional order applicable to Hong Kong and that conduct contrary to those provisions could constitute "other unlawful means" under Article 22 of the NSL.

Independent assessments emphasised the consequence of treating the objective itself as unlawful. Eric Lai, a senior fellow at Georgetown University's Center for Asian Law and an expert on Hong Kong's legal system, told CNN that civil-society actors who had assumed that renouncing violence and working within the law would keep them outside the scope of national-security offences would have to reconsider that assumption. In the Associated Press's report following the handling down of the judgment, he put the doctrinal consequence more directly, that "[m]oderation of method offers no protection if the objective itself is held to be unconstitutional."

== See also ==
- Hong Kong national security law
- Hong Kong Alliance in Support of Patriotic Democratic Movements of China
- Lee Cheuk-yan
- Albert Ho
- Chow Hang-tung
- 1989 Tiananmen Square protests and massacre
- HKSAR v Lai Chee Ying & Others
- Hong Kong 47
