= Hong Kong Alliance in Support of Patriotic Democratic Movements of China =

Hong Kong pro-democracy organisation

Hong Kong Alliance in Support of Patriotic Democratic Movements of China 香港市民支援愛國民主運動聯合會
- Founded: 21 May 1989
- Dissolved: 25 September 2021
- Type: Non-profit organisation NGO
- Key people: Szeto Wah (founder); Lee Cheuk-yan (last chairman)
- Website: www.alliance.org.hk

Hong Kong Alliance in Support of Patriotic Democratic Movements of China
- Traditional Chinese: 香港市民支援愛國民主運動聯合會
- Simplified Chinese: 香港市民支援爱国民主运动联合会
Transcriptions
Standard Mandarin
- Hanyu Pinyin: Xiānggǎng shìmín zhīyuán àiguó mínzhǔ yùndòng liánhéhuì
Yue: Cantonese
- Yale Romanization: Hēung góng Síh màhn Jī wùhn Oi gwok Màhn jyú Wahn duhng Lyùhn hahp wuih
- Jyutping: Hoeng^{1} gong^{2} Si^{5} man^{4} Zi^{1} wun^{4} Oi^{3} gwok^{3} Man^{4} zyu^{2} Wan^{6} dung^{6} Lyun^{4} hap^{6} wui^{6*2}

Abbreviation
- Traditional Chinese: 支聯會
- Simplified Chinese: 支联会
Transcriptions
Standard Mandarin
- Hanyu Pinyin: Zhīliánhuì
Yue: Cantonese
- Yale Romanization: Jī Lyùhn wuih
- Jyutping: Zi^{1} Lyun^{4} wui^{6*2}

The Hong Kong Alliance in Support of Patriotic Democratic Movements of China (Chinese: 香港市民支援愛國民主運動聯合會; abbr. 支聯會; Cantonese Mandarin ) was a pro-democracy organisation that was established on 21 May 1989 in the then British colony of Hong Kong during the 1989 Tiananmen Square protests and massacre in Beijing. After the 4 June massacre, the organisation main goals were the rehabilitation of the democracy movement and the accountability for the massacre. The main activities the organisation held were the annual memorials and commemorations, of which the candlelight vigil in Victoria Park was the most attended, reported and discussed event each year. Due to its stance, the Central government in Beijing considers the organisation subversive.

Five members of the Alliance including vice chairwoman Chow Hang-tung were arrested on 8 and 9 September 2021, after it had rejected a request by police to cooperate in an investigation into it allegedly acting as an "agent of foreign forces", a crime under the Hong Kong national security law. Three leaders of the Alliance were arrested on other national security charges on 9 September, and its assets were frozen. The Alliance finally decided to dissolve on 25 September after all standing committee members were remanded in custody or jailed. On 11 September 2026 the Alliance was fined 1.5 million Hong Kong dollars for incitement of subversion, at the same time as the three leaders were jailed for the same offence.

== Five operational goals ==
The Alliance had five operational goals:

1. Release the dissidents (釋放民運人士)
2. Rehabilitate the 1989 pro-democracy movement (平反八九民運)
3. Demand accountability of the 4 June massacre (追究屠城責任)
4. End one-party dictatorship (結束一黨專政)
5. Build a democratic China (建設民主中國)

== History ==
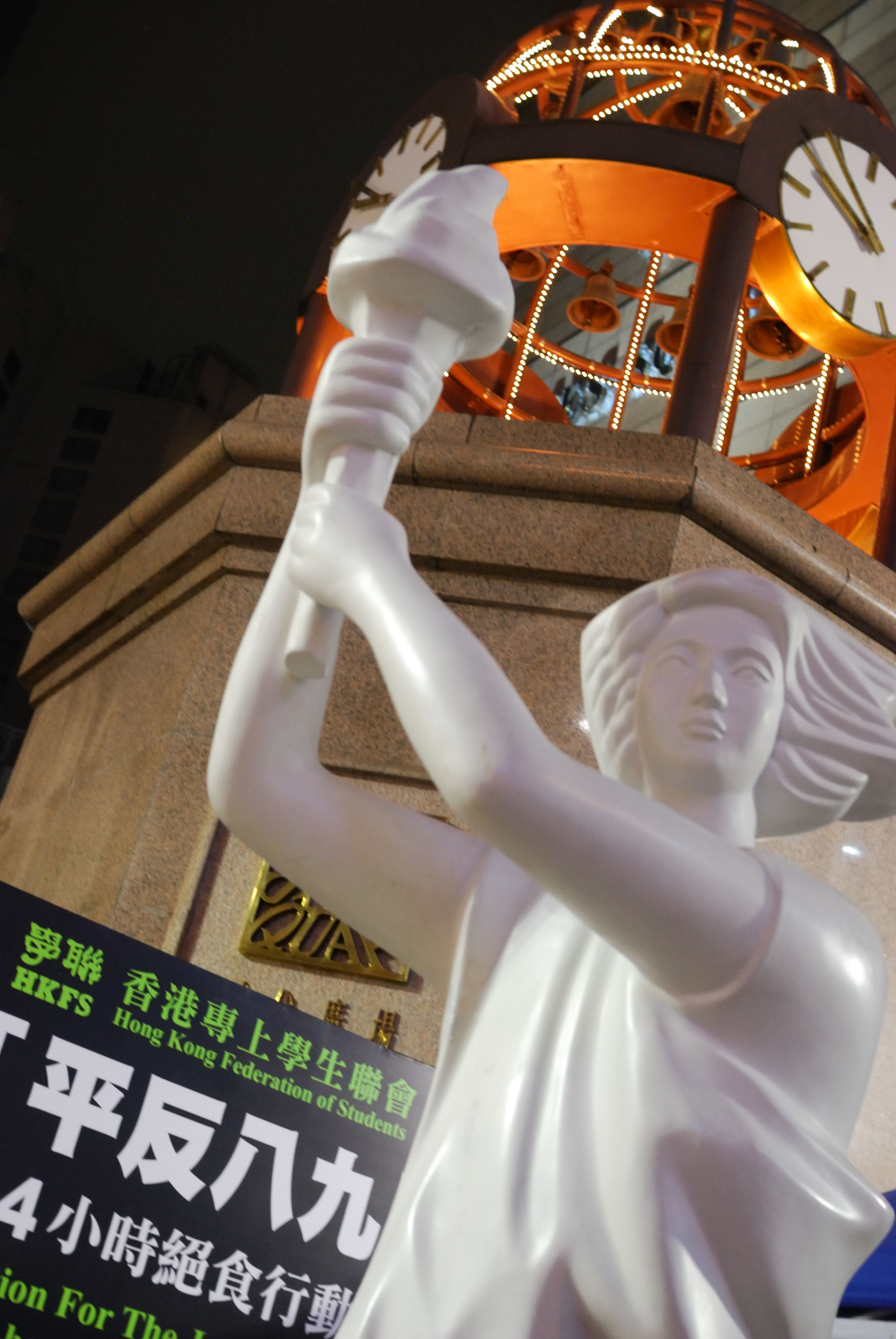
A statue of the Goddess of Democracy erected by the Alliance at the Times Square in 2009

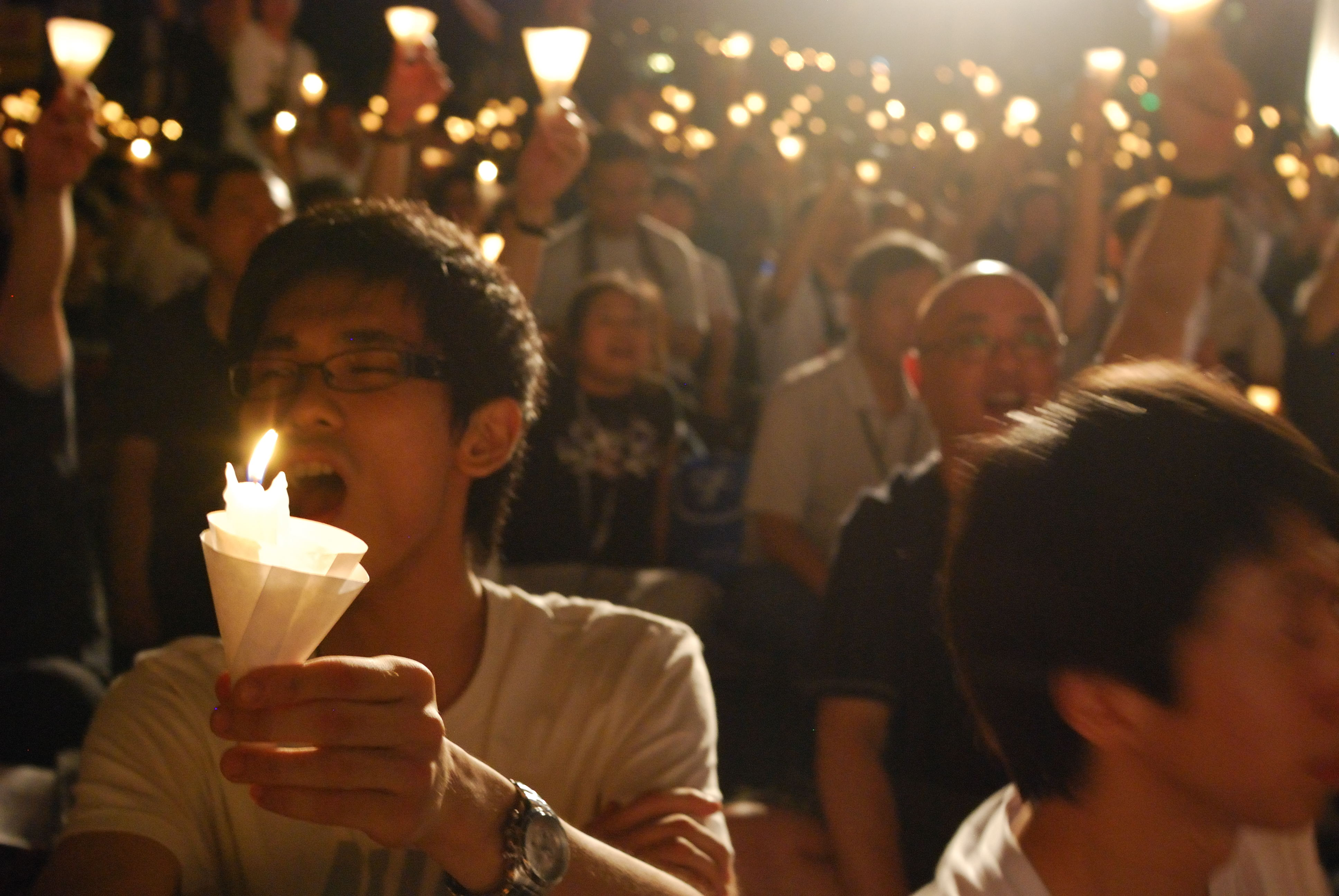
20th anniversary of Tiananmen Square protests of 1989

=== Inception and early years ===
In 1989, the sudden death of the former General Secretary of the Chinese Communist Party (CCP) Hu Yaobang, widely considered a liberal figure within the party leadership, sparked a series of protests at Tiananmen Square. The Hong Kong Federation of Students (FHKS) visited the student protesters in Beijing and mobilised for the support of the Hong Kong society after they returned to Hong Kong. On 20 May 1989 after Premier Li Peng imposed the martial law, the Joint Committee on the Promotion of Democratic Government (JCPDG), an umbrella organisation of the local pro-democracy activists decided to hold a demonstration at the Victoria Park and marched to the headquarters of New China News Agency (NCNA). On 21 May during the No. 8 typhoon signal, more than a million people marched in the street in support of the Tiananmen protests. The Hong Kong Alliance in Support of Patriotic Democratic Movements of China was founded during the march.

On 4 June 1989, the Beijing government deployed troops to suppress the demonstrations. After the massacre, delegates from more than 200 civil groups elected a 20-member Standing Committee headed by Szeto Wah and Martin Lee to hold the subsequent commemorations and actions. The Alliance helped the "Operation Yellowbird", providing shelters and financial assistance in helping smuggling leaders of the democracy movement out of China. The Alliance also set up a database of the democracy movement and published works related to the movement. It also maintained close relationship with the Tiananmen Mothers initiated by Ding Zilin, a group of family members of those who were killed in the massacre, which vocally supported the democracy movements in China. State-run People's Daily accused the Alliance of having intention to overthrow the Chinese government. Szeto and Lee, who were members of the Hong Kong Basic Law Drafting Committee were unseated by Beijing after the duo resigned from the committee after the massacre.

=== Annual commemoration of the 1989 Tiananmen protests and massacre ===
The annual candlelight vigil at the Victoria Park among other activities was the most iconic event organised by the Alliance, as it was the most attended consecutive commemoration of the 1989 protests. Tensions were high in 1996, which marked the seventh anniversary of the Tiananmen massacre. Residents were not sure whether or not the annual demonstration would continue after the upcoming 1997 sovereignty handover of Hong Kong to the People's Republic of China. The eighth anniversary, in 1997, was just before the handover. People in the demonstration speculated that it might turn out to be the last vigil. In 1997, then Chief Executive-elect Tung Chee-hwa attempted to pressure Szeto into not organizing the vigil, and Szeto refused to speak to Tung ever again after three such attempts.

As the protests were largely censored in mainland China, the Alliance was one of the main sources of both the mainland and the local people to learn about the event. On the 20th anniversary of the 1989 Tiananmen Square protests and massacre, the Alliance recorded a dramatic increase in number of the attendees of the vigil, which was largely due to attendees from the young generation. A year before the Alliance also organised events and protests in support of the Charter 08 movement launched by mainland democracy activists such as Liu Xiaobo. After Szeto Wah, the Alliance's founding chairman died in 2011, the chairmanship was occupied by Lee Cheuk-yan. In 2014, the Alliance opened the 4 June Museum, the world's first memorial museum for the Tiananmen protests. In 2014, Albert Ho took over from Lee as the Alliance chairman until 2019, when the post was again taken up by Lee.

The number of attendees kept at a high level until in recent years the emergence of the localist movement challenged the meaning of commemorating the Tiananmen protests, as some young localists perceived themselves as non-Chinese and disagreed with one of the goals of the Alliance, "build a democratic China". Such a view was held by localist scholar Chin Wan, who believed that the Chinese nationalistic sentiment and patriotism the Alliance projected was an obstacle for Hong Kong people to construct a distinct identity. Some other criticisms included the overlapping membership of the Alliance and the Democratic Party, the ritualisation of the vigil and the ineffectiveness of the Alliance of achieving any of its operational goals. Since 2013 as the Hong Kong–Mainland China conflict intensified, the number of the attendees to the vigil gradually dropped. From 2015 to 2016, the number the Alliance recorded dropped from 180,000 to 135,000.

=== 2021 crackdown and ensuing legal cases ===
==== Timeline ====
Increased pressure by Hong Kong authorities, believed by observers to have been prompted by the Chinese government, had caused several pro-democracy organizations and civic groups to disband by August 2021. News of a special meeting of the Alliance on 23 August, which reportedly suggested dissolution, was seen by observers as another sign of this pressure. There were reports that the Alliance had been forewarned about legal action, should it not resolve of its own accord by the end of August. A senior superintendent of the national security department of the Hong Kong Police Force told a Hong Kong court in August 2022 that he had begun investigating the Alliance at the beginning of 2021.

In April 2021, convenor Lee Cheuk-yan was convicted, along with six other pro-democracy advocates, for his role in a rally that took place on 18 August 2019. He was sentenced to 14 months in jail for his role in this and another August 2019 rally. Fellow standing committee member, Albert Ho, was given a 12-month suspended sentence.

On the 32nd anniversary of the protests in June 2021, the vice chairwoman of the Alliance was arrested by Hong Kong Police. Chow Hang-tung was charged with promoting unauthorised assembly. She was thrust into the limelight in 2021 because Lee and Ho were both in prison. Although she was released on 5 June on bail, Chow was arrested again on 30 June and this time bail was refused. It was finally granted on 5 August.

In July 2021, the Alliance announced that it was dismissing all its permanent staff with effect from the end of the month to "ensure their safety"; seven members of its steering committee had resigned in view of "growing political and legal risks."

On 27 July, the Alliance pleaded guilty on charges of having run its museum without a proper licence and paid an amount of 8,000 Hong Kong dollars (US$1,025) as a fine. The charge had been brought by the Food and Environmental Hygiene Department.

On 4 August, the Alliance launched an online museum to replace the physical one, which had remained closed. The Alliance stated that the move to a website, run by an independent team, had been necessary due to "drastic changes" to Hong Kong's political environment and "intensified political repression".

On 23 August, the standing committee of the Alliance held a special meeting. Vice chairwoman Chow did not confirm that the outcome was a recommendation to dissolve the Alliance, pointing to the annual general meeting as the occasion where all decisions would be taken. On 25 August, police served a letter in which it accused the Alliance of collusion with foreign forces, a crime under the Hong Kong national security law. The letter asked about the connections of the Alliance with foreign organizations including the National Endowment for Democracy, as well as the exchanges of the Alliance with Mark Simon, a close ally of jailed media mogul Jimmy Lai. In an open letter on 7 September the Alliance rejected the police request, saying that the charge of being a "foreign agent" had not been explained, and that it considered the letter itself to have "no legal basis".

On 8 September, police arrested Chow and three other committee members and on 9 September, a further committee member, over refusing a police data request made under the national security law. Also on 9 September, police froze 2.2 million Hong Kong dollars' worth of assets of the Alliance, charged its leaders Chow, Ho and Lee as well as the Alliance with "incitement to subversion", and raided the premises of the Alliance.

On 10 September, the court rejected the bail application of Chow; Ho and Lee had not lodged one. The court also rejected a request for a public bail hearing. The same day, bail was denied to the five defendants in the national security data probe, with bail reporting restrictions however being lifted. All defendants pleaded not guilty. On 16 September, the Alliance published a statement saying that, following a police request from 10 September, it would delete its website and social media accounts that day, and publish information on a new platform.

On 20 September, the Alliance disclosed identical, typed letters by Ho and Lee which recommended the dissolution of the organization at the special meeting scheduled for 25 September. On 24 September, Chow voiced opposition to the Alliance proactively disbanding, saying that this would be "severing any possibility of continuing to resist in the name of the Alliance", and that Lee and Ho "might have other considerations that cannot be stated [in their letters]". At the 25 September meeting, the Alliance decided to disband, with 41 members voting in favour and four against. Afterwards, Company Secretary of the Alliance Richard Tsoi told the press that he believed that "Hong Kong people, no matter in [an] individual capacity or other capacities, will continue commemorating June 4th as before." The assets of the Alliance, including the shuttered museum, were frozen by police on 29 September. The same day, an online archive of the museum became unavailable via the main internet providers in the city.

On 22 October, the five Alliance members who were arrested on 8 and 9 September over the data refusal were granted bail. Chow and Simon Leung unsuccessfully attempted to refuse bail because the conditions included speech restrictions. Chow remained in custody for her other national security charge.

On 26 October, before liquidation procedures were completed, Carrie Lam, the chief executive, ordered the city's Companies Registry to strike the Alliance. A government statement called the operation of the Alliance as amounting to subversion. The step had been foreshadowed by Security Secretary Chris Tang in a letter to the Alliance on 10 September. One of the liquidators called the order "premature and unnecessary".

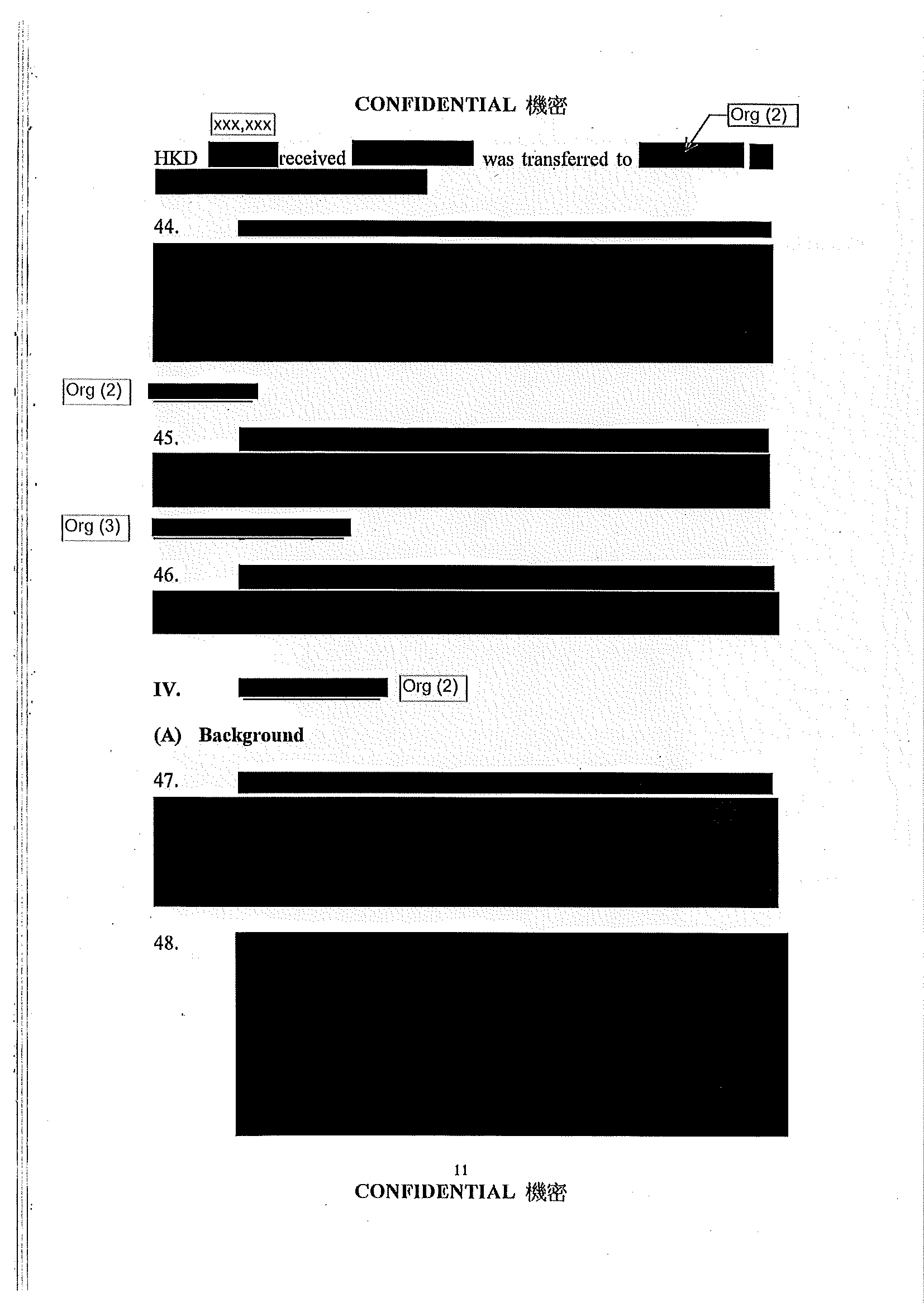
The Court of Final Appeal ruled that the heavy redaction of the police document's information was making them useless in proving the Alliance is a foreign agent

In December 2021 and May 2022, Leung and another Alliance member, Chan To-wai, respectively pleaded guilty to the data refusal and were each sentenced to three months in jail. Two weeks before the trial of the same case was to begin on 13 July 2022, Chow, representing herself, unsuccessfully sought to obtain details of the prosecution's case on the grounds that it would be "impossible" to prepare her case without it. On 29 August 2022, it transpired in court that the Hong Kong Alliance was accused of having received 20,000 Hong Kong dollars from an otherwise unnamed "Organisation 4", which prosecution said was an "international political organization", among whose guiding principles was "to end one party ruling, and to rebuild a democratic China".

On 11 March 2023, Chow, Tang Ngok-kwan, and Tsui Hon-kwong were sentenced to 4.5 months in prison each over the data refusal. After the sentencing, the three were granted bail pending their appeal, on the condition of not accepting interviews or giving speeches endangering national security. Chow rejected bail "on grounds of freedom of expression". In the appeal hearing in December 2023, the three defendants argued that the Alliance was not a foreign agent as alleged by police, and had thus not been required to provide the requested data. The appeal was rejected in March 2024. An application for a certificate to appeal that verdict in the High Court was rejected on 17 April 2024. On 6 March 2025, the Court of Final Appeal unanimously quashed the data demand refusal convictions after all three Alliance members had completed their related sentences. The court said that the heavy redaction of information had rendered it useless in proving the claim that the Alliance had acted as a foreign agent, and had "deprived the appellants of a fair trial".

In August 2025, High Court judge Alex Lee said that the national security trial of the Hong Kong Alliance would begin in November, with the court having set aside 75 days for it. According to judicial records obtained in October 2025, the trial would have originally begun on 11 November but was delayed, for the second time, to January 2026.

On 11 September 2026, the Hong Kong Alliance was sentenced and ordered to pay a 1.5 million HKD fine in the incitement to subversion case. Its lead figures Chow, Ho and Lee were jailed for the same charge that day.

==== Reactions ====
The arrests on 9 September 2021 met with strong criticism by United States Foreign Secretary Antony Blinken, who on Twitter said the action "constitute[d] a blatant abuse of the law". A representative of the Hong Kong Liaison Office expressed its support for the police operation, stating that the Alliance had been "smearing the police". An editorial in the state-owned Global Times accused Blinken and his British counterpart Dominic Raab of "useless wailing for Hong Kong Alliance".

The sentencing of Chow, Tang, and Tsui on 11 March 2023 was condemned by the High Representative of the Union for Foreign Affairs and Security Policy of the European Union, with spokesperson Nabila Massrali saying on Twitter on that day that it was "another example of the authorities abusing legislation to suppress fundamental freedoms". The following day, a spokesperson of the Commissioner's Office of the Chinese Foreign Ministry in Hong Kong "strongly rejected" the remarks by Massrali, calling them "irresponsible", and said that they "vilified the judicial justice" in Hong Kong. The same day, the Hong Kong government released a statement which also likewise strongly rejected the criticism by Massrali.

== List of chairmen ==
1. Szeto Wah, 1989–2011
2. Lee Cheuk-yan, 2011–2014, 2019–2021
3. Albert Ho, 2014–2019

== See also ==
- Chinese Alliance for Democracy
- Human rights in China
- June 4th Museum
- June 4th Memorial Association
