= China Human Rights Biweekly =

United States-based Chinese-language online magazine

Human Rights in China Biweekly
- Frequency: Biweekly
- Format: Online
- First issue: 1 June 2009
- Final issue Number: 30 January 2020; Issue 279
- Based in: New York City
- Language: Chinese
- Website: biweeklyarchive.hrichina.org www.hrichina.org/chs

China Human Rights Biweekly
- Traditional Chinese: 中國人權雙周刊
- Simplified Chinese: 中国人权双周刊
Transcriptions
Standard Mandarin
- Hanyu Pinyin: Zhōngguó rénquán shuāngzhōukān

The China Human Rights Biweekly (traditional Chinese: 中國人權雙周刊; simplified Chinese: 中国人权双周刊; pinyin: Zhōngguó rénquán shuāngzhōukān), also known as Zhongguo Renquan Shuangzhoukan or Chinese Human Rights Biweekly or China's Human Rights Biweekly, generally known as Human Rights in China Biweekly, abbreviated as HRIC Biweekly, is a United States-based Chinese online magazine founded and owned by the non-governmental organization "Human Rights in China". It was officially inaugurated on 1 June 2009. As of January 30, 2020, the magazine will no longer been updated.

Human Rights in China Biweekly is a newsletter of news and opinions that are banned and censored in the mainland China. Since its founding, the magazine has been repeatedly paralysed by cyberattacks made by hackers from mainland China. The mission of the HRIC Biweekly is to "advocate for the progress of human rights in China" (为中国的人权进步呐喊). The journal is one of the main platforms for overseas Chinese liberal intellectuals (中国自由知识分子) to speak out and is also the mainstream media of the overseas pro-democracy movement.

== History ==
The first issue of Human Rights in China Biweekly was published on 1 June 2009, as a result of the merger of the former monthly magazine Human Beings and Human Rights (人与人权) and the weekly magazine Huaxia Electronics Post (华夏电子报).

== No longer updated ==
As of November 29, 2020, the website of Human Rights in China Biweekly is still accessible, but the magazine is no longer updated.
