= Ding Zilin =

Chinese human rights activist and academic

- 丁子霖
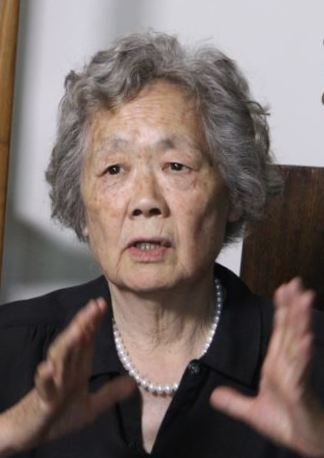
- Zilin in 2014
- Born: December 20, 1936 (age 89); Shanghai
- Education: Renmin University of China
- Occupations: Human rights activist, academic
- Organization: Tiananmen Mothers
- Known for: Advocacy for relatives of the Tiananmen square crackdown victims
- Movement: June the 4th Movement
- Spouse: Jiang Peikun (m. 1970; died 2015)
- Children: Jiang Jielian
- Awards: Vasyl Stus Award

Ding Zilin (Chinese: 丁子霖; pinyin: Dīng Zǐlín; born December 20, 1936, or January 1, 1939) is a retired professor of philosophy and the leader of the political activist group Tiananmen Mothers. Ding is the mother of Jiang Jielian, one of the first student protestors killed during the 1989 Tiananmen Square protests and ensuing crackdown.

== Biography ==
Ding, born in Shanghai on December 20, 1936, was professor of philosophy at Renmin University of China in Beijing. Her husband, Jiang Peikun (蔣培坤), was head of the Aesthetics Institute at the university.

Ding's seventeen-year-old son, Jiang Jielian, was one of the first to be killed when the People's Liberation Army crushed the Tiananmen Square protests. He left the family home in defiance of the curfew. Accounts vary of what happened next. Eyewitnesses had told her that her son was shot and was left to bleed to death on the night of June 3, 1989. Ding says he was shot through the heart by riot police on the way to Tiananmen Square. He was rushed to the Beijing Children's Hospital, where he was pronounced "Dead on arrival".

Following her son's death, Ding said she attempted suicide six times.

In August 1989, she met another bereaved mother, and found a commonality within the self-help group, which continued growing. She formed a network of some 150 other families who had lost sons and daughters during the 1989 Tiananmen massacre, and this group became known as "Tiananmen Mothers". Ever since that day, she has been asking the government to apologize for the deaths. She and some others have faced imprisonment, house-arrest, phone-tapping and constant surveillance.

In 1991, after an interview she gave to ABC News, the government prevented her and her husband from carrying out their work or research, and were barred from publishing domestically. Party membership was revoked. In addition, she was detained for more than 40 days. She was forced into early retirement. Since her release, she was under close supervision by the authorities. Harassment continued when on September 9, 1994, she was arrested in front of the university and held by police for two hours, for having had published an article in the foreign media "hurtful to the people". Again in 1995, she and her husband were arrested in Wuxi on August 18 and incarcerated until September 30, allegedly on "economic matters", and were denied visitors. In 1996 Ding's husband was forced to retire early. Since February 28, 2000, she has been under 24-hour surveillance by the authorities.

In 2004, she and other Tiananmen Mothers were put under house arrest shortly before the 15th anniversary of the massacre to prevent them from holding any public memorial or protest. She was allegedly told by a senior official that a review of the June 4, 1989, crackdown was "out of the question". In 2006, Time magazine selected her as one of the "60 Asian heroes".

She has been collecting the names of those who were shot dead by the People's Liberation Army in Beijing around June 4, 1989. At the end of June 2006, Ding was able to confirm 186 deaths through her own efforts despite repeated harassment by the authorities. However, upon close inspection of the cause of deaths, not all individuals on Ding's list died directly at the hands of the army. For example, at least one of the individuals on the list had committed suicide after the uprising had been squashed.

She and her husband have been under house arrest as of May 24, 2004. On February 8, 2007, she won the Vasyl Stus "Freedom-to-Write" Award for her book Looking for the June 4 victims. She was ordered to leave Beijing for a forced vacation during the 2008 Summer Olympics. Following the announcement that Liu Xiaobo had won the 2010 Nobel Peace Prize, and his dedication of his prize to those who died in 1989, dissident groups reported on October 18 she and her husband may have been taken into custody by police, and have not been seen or heard from for four days; their phones have been cut off.

== Activism ==
Since her son's death in the Tiananmen Square protests of 1989, Ding Zilin has been fighting for justice for the victims. Her activism has drawn international attention and association with recognizable human rights groups such as Amnesty International, Human Rights Watch and HRIC (Human Rights in China). New York based human rights watchdog HRIC has been labelled by the Chinese government as a hostile organization. Because of Ding Zilin's efforts, Amnesty International has a political campaign to put pressure on the Chinese government to acknowledge and apologize for the deaths of so many citizens. Amnesty applauded the Chinese government in June 2007 for allowing Ding Zilin, her husband and two other dead citizens' kin to light candles west of Tiananmen Square. Despite the minimal recognition from the government, Amnesty urges Chinese authorities to allow open debate and more public memorials in order to help improve Chinas human rights record and the image of Beijing on the international stage. Ding Zilin and human rights groups demand the Chinese government to stop labelling the student protest with political jargon such as "counter-revolutionary rebellion".

=== Organization ===
Tiananmen Mothers is an activist group of people who lost family members on June fourth. Spearheaded by Ding Zilin they have collected over one hundred names of individuals who openly state that they lost a loved one on that day. Over the past twenty years in public letters published by multiple sources including Human Rights in China, The China Post, The New York Times, Time and Amnesty International, the Tiananmen Mothers continue to publish a list of demands:

- The right to mourn peacefully and in public
- The right to accept humanitarian aid from organizations and individuals inside and outside China
- No more persecution of June Fourth victims, including those injured in the massacre and the families of the dead
- The release of all people still suffering in prison for their role in the 1989 protests
- A full, public accounting for the June Fourth Massacre, ending the impunity for the perpetrators of this crime

=== Civil disobedience ===
Despite her multiple arrests and constant surveillance, civil disobedience is Ding Zilin's daily choice, she never stops using her voice to speak out in non-violent ways against the violations of human rights committed by the Chinese government. On April 5, 2004, Time magazine said that Ding Zilin is "the symbolic leader for many people in China who want the government to account for its actions that night. She is a small woman with a strong voice. Her bereavement makes her powerful". Author of Beijing Coma, Ma Jian also discusses her civil disobedience in a June 4, 2008, New York Times article. He describes how she will once again defy authorities and lay a memorial off Chang'an Avenue. He suggests "behind the bravado, the party is as fearful as a deer in the headlights," of displays of support that show that despite government efforts to erase history many refuse to forget.

=== Statements ===
In June 2009, in a Newsweek interview with Ding Zilin, she condemned the actions and legacy of many historical figures. She questioned why Deng Xiaoping was not brought to justice like the notorious former Cambodian Khmer Rouge leader Pol Pot. Ding Zilin uses her son's story to spread the message of human rights in China and feels it should be a central political issue. She was disappointed when US Secretary of State Hillary Clinton said that close Sino-American Relations should not be overshadowed by human rights. She does, however, acknowledge that in 1995 Hillary Clinton helped to get her released from one of her many incarcerations. Ding Zilin condemned former President Bill Clinton for attending a ceremonial red carpet appearance in Tiananmen Square: "With the blood of the students still wet, the wounds still there, unhealed, how could Clinton step onto the red carpet to review Chinese troops?". Human Rights Watch claims that on May 26, 1994, President Clinton said China had not made significant progress on many of the issues outlined in his 1993 Executive Order, however, a tough human rights policy was hampering the ability of the US to pursue other interests. Human rights groups like HRIC, Amnesty International and Human Rights Watch describe in their philosophies to be critical of governments gaining international power with bad human rights records.

Ding Zilin has dedicated the remainder of her life after her son's death to being a human rights activist. She has most recently spoken out in support of Nobel Peace Prize winner Liu Xiaobo. Her continued campaigning relies on support from fundraising organizations like Fill the Square.

== Internet video ==
- (Chinese video) Tiananmen Square protests Part.19of20 on YouTube

== See also ==
- Human Rights in China
- Political dissident
- List of Chinese dissidents
- Amnesty International
- Tiananmen Square Protests of 1989
- Human Rights Watch
- Egg on Mao: The Story of an Ordinary Man Who Defaced an Icon and Unmasked a Dictatorship
