= Sharon Hom =

Sharon Kang Hom
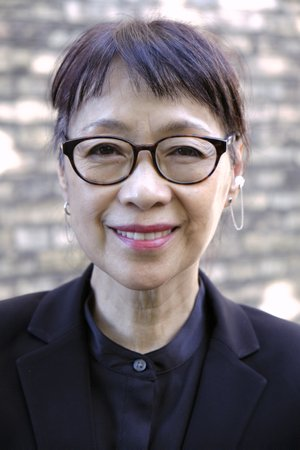
- Hom in 2021
- Born: May 20, 1951 (age 75)
- Occupation: Human rights activist
- Years active: 1990–present

Executive Director of Human Rights in China
- In office 2003–2023
- Website: www.hrichina.org/en

Sharon Kang Hom (Chinese: 譚競嫦, born 20 May 1951) is an adjunct professor of law at the New York University School of Law and Professor of Law Emerita at the City University of New York School of Law; from 2002-2023, she served as Executive Director of Human Rights in China. Hom taught law for 18 years, including training judges, lawyers, and law teachers at eight law schools in China. Her non-law book publications include Chinese Women Traversing Diaspora: Memoirs, Essays, and Poetry (ed., 1999). In 2007, she was named by the Wall Street Journal as one of the "50 Women to Watch" for their impact on business. Born in Hong Kong, she lives in New York with her family.

== Biography ==
Sharon Hom was born in Hong Kong. She received her Bachelor of Arts from Sarah Lawrence College and her Juris Doctor from the New York University School of Law, where she was a Root-Tilden Scholar.

Hom has extensive experience in U.S.-Chinese law training and legal exchange initiatives. She was a Fulbright Scholar in China (1986–88), served on the U.S.-China Committee on Legal Education Exchange with China (CLEEC) (1990–2000), and was a faculty member and program director for the U.S. Clinical Legal Education Workshop convened at Tsinghua University School of Law (2000). She was also a scholar-in-residence at the Rockefeller Foundation's Bellagio Center in Italy (2000).

She has participated in numerous Non-Governmental Organization, corporate, multilateral and bilateral consultations and workshops. She has testified on behalf of HRIC before a number of international policy makers, including the US House Committee on Foreign Affairs and the European Parliament, and has given numerous presentations at major conferences on human rights and China organized by non-governmental groups such as the Carnegie Endowment for International Peace and World Press Freedom Committee.

She served on the Committee on Legal Education Exchange with China (CLEEC) (1990–2000), the Committee on Asian Affairs (1998–2002) of the Bar Association of the City of New York, and sits on the advisory board of Human Rights Watch/Asia (1995–present). She served as Executive Director of Human Rights in China from 2003 - 2023.

== Selected publications ==
Hom's research and publications focus on Chinese legal reforms, women's rights and international human rights.

=== Books and book chapters ===
- Contracting Law (1996, 2000)
- English-Chinese Lexicon of Women and Law (Yinghan funu yu falu cihuishiyi) (UNESCO, 1995)
- Chinese Women Traversing Diaspora: Memoirs, Essays, and Poetry (1999)
- Challenging China: Struggle and Home in an Era of Change (2007)
- “The Promise of a People's Olympics,” China's Great Leap: The Beijing Games and Olympian Human Rights Challenges (2008), (Minky Worden, ed.)
- "Advancing women's international human rights in China," Gender Equality, Citizenship and Human Rights: Controversies and challenges in China and the Nordic countries (2010),(Pauline Stoltz, Marina Svensson, Sun Zhongxin, Qi Wang eds.)
- “Claiming Women’s Rights in China,” The Unfinished Revolution: Voices from the Global Fight for Women’s Rights (2012), (Minky Worden, ed.)

=== Articles ===
- The “Occupy Central 9” Cases: Rule of Law or Rule by Law in Hong Kong? THE JURIST (April 30, 2019).
- “China and the WTO: Year One”, China Rights Forum, 2003, No. 1.
- Commentary: Re-positioning Human Rights Discourse on “Asian” Perspectives. BUFFALO JOURNAL OF INTERNATIONAL LAW 3:1 (1996): pages 251-276; Reprinted in NEGOTIATING CULTURE AND HUMAN RIGHTS, edited by Lynda S. Bell, Andrew J. Nathan, and Ilan Peleg (New York: Columbia University Press, 2001).
- Cross-Discipline Trafficking: What's Justice Got to Do with It? In Orientations: Mapping Studies in the Asian Diaspora, edited by Kandice Chuh and Karen Shimakawa. Durham and London: Duke University Press, 2001
- With Eric Yamamoto, Re-forming Civil Rights in Uncivil Times: The Struggle over Collective Memory and Internationalizing Domestic Rights. UCLA LAW REVIEW 47:6 (August 2000): pages 1747–1802.
- Lexicon Dreams and Chinese Rock and Roll: Thoughts on Culture, Language, and Translation as Strategies of Resistance and Reconstruction. UNIVERSITY OF MIAMI LAW REVIEW 53:4 (July 1999): pages 1003–1018.
- Return(ing) Hong Kong: Journal Notes and Reflections. AMERASIA JOURNAL 23:2 (1997): pages 55–68.
- Law, Ideology & Patriarchy in the People's Republic of China: Feminist Observations of an Ethnic Spectator. THE INTERNATIONAL REVIEW OF COMPARATIVE PUBLIC POLICY 4 (1992): pages 173–191.
- Female Infanticide in China: The Specter of Human Rights and Thoughts Towards (An)other Vision. COLUMBIA HUMAN RIGHTS LAW REVIEW 23:2 (1992): 249–314. Anthologized in CRITICAL RACE FEMINISMS: A LEGAL READER, edited by Adrien Wing (New York: New York University Press, 1997); and Reprinted in CHINESE LAW: SOCIAL, POLITICAL, HISTORICAL, AND ECONOMIC PERSPECTIVES, edited by Tahirih V. Lee (New York: Garland Publishing Inc., 1997).

== Testimonies and Presentations ==
- U.S. Congressional-Executive Commission on China: 15 Years after Tiananmen: Is Democracy in China's Future?, June 2004
- U.S. House of Representatives Committee on International Relations: The Internet in China: A Tool for Freedom or Suppression?, February 2006
- U.S. House of Representatives Committee on International Relations: Monitoring Respect for Human Rights around the World: A Review of the Country Reports on Human Rights Practices for 2005, March 2006
- U.S. Commission on International Religious Freedom: The Many Faces of China's Repression: Human Rights, Religious Freedom, and U.S. Diplomacy in China, January 2007
- World Press Freedom Committee, After the 2008 Olympics in China, What Next for Press Freedom?, from "Challenges and Opportunities of New Media for Press Freedom", February 2007
- European Parliament Subcommittee on Human Rights: Hearing on Human Rights in China in the Run-up to the Olympics, November 2007
- Intervention before the Sub Committee on Human Rights, European Parliament Exchange of Views in preparation for the EU-China human rights dialogue, May 3, 2007.
- U.S. Congressional-Executive Commission on China: The Impact of the 2008 Olympic Games on Human Rights and the Rule of Law in China, February 2008
- Panelist, “Google and Internet Control in China: A Nexus Between Human Rights and Trade?”, U.S. Congressional-Executive Commission on China, March 24, 2010
- Intervention before the Sub Committee on Human Rights, European Parliament Exchange of Views on Human Rights in China and the Role of the European Union following the last meeting of the EU China Human Rights Dialogue, December 5, 2011.
- Panelist, “Examination into the Abuse and Extralegal Detention of Legal Advocate Chen Guangcheng and His Family”, U.S. Congressional-Executive Commission on China, Washington, D.C., November 1, 2011.
- "Values and Strategic Narratives in International Human Rights," Panel on Value of Values: reconsidering the Role of Human Rights in US-China Relations," Wilson Center, Kissinger Institute on China, April 20, 2016.
