= Jiang Jielian =

Chinese student

- 蒋捷连
- Jiang in 1989.
- Born: June 2, 1972
- Died: June 3, 1989 (aged 17); Building No. 29 Fuxingmenwai Street, Beijing
- Cause of death: Gunshot wound
- Education: High School Affiliated to Renmin University
- Occupations: Student, activist
- Movement: June 4th Movement
- Mother: Ding Zilin

Jiang Jielian (Chinese: 蒋捷连; pinyin: Jiǎng Jiélián; June 2, 1972 – June 3, 1989) was a second-year student at the High School Affiliated to Renmin University of China.

Jiang was an active participant in the 1989 Tiananmen Square protests, and was killed during the military crackdown on the demonstrations. Jiang was one of the first casualties whose death was acknowledged in internal bulletins by the Chinese Communist Party (CCP) authorities.

== Role during the 1989 protests ==
After the death of Hu Yaobang on April 15, 1989, Jiang became deeply concerned and enthusiastic about the student movement. After school, he often went to Peking University and Renmin University of China to read the big-character posters, copy down slogans, and listen to speeches. Among those slogans, Jiang copied "Many that live deserve death. And some that die deserve life!" (gai si de mei you si, bu gai si de que si le). Jiang also participated in several student protests. On April 19, Jiang joined a sit-in in front of Xinhua Gate of Zhongnanhai (entrance to the government leadership compound) requesting that the government re-evaluate Hu Yaobang's achievements, and demanding to be allowed to express their respects to Hu. This protest was eventually broken up by military policemen. On May 13, when the student hunger strike at Tiananmen Square began, Jiang often volunteered as a night guard of student pickets, who were organized to keep order in the Square. On May 17, Jiang and his classmates organized a march in support of university students. Over two thousand students participated in this march, and this was the first time in the movement that high-school students had organized themselves to join a march. A photo recorded a moment of this march: A paper sign held up high by one of Jiang's fellow marchers, the poster clearly stated their supports of the university students "If you all fall, we will still be here!" (Ni men dao xia, hai you wo men).

== Death ==
On June 3, the situation in Beijing suddenly changed. China Central Television repeatedly broadcast an announcement telling citizens to stay in their homes or they would be responsible for any serious consequences.

Jiang became anxious after hearing this news. He worried about the safety of the university students at Tiananmen Square and immediately said he had to join his comrades in Tiananmen Square.

Jiang left home at 10:30 p.m. on June 3. He and his classmate decided to cycle to the Square, but were both shot by troops when they reached Muxidi.

His classmate heard him say softly, "I think I've been hit." Then he squatted down and passed out. His pale yellow T-shirt was soaked with red blood. It was around 1:10 a.m. Eyewitnesses claimed Jiang was left to bleed to death, but was eventually taken to Beijing Children's hospital. By the time Jiang was sent to a hospital, his heart had already stopped beating. The death certificate from the hospital stated: "Dead before arrival at the hospital." Jiang was one of the first victims of the June 4 crackdown in Beijing.

=== Legacy ===
According to Eddie Cheng, the last words Jiang left to his mother, Ding Zilin, were: "The important thing is not action, but participation." After Jiang's death, Ding Zilin formed a pro-democracy organization named Tiananmen Mothers. Since its founding, the organization has pushed for a change in the government's position over the suppression of the Tiananmen Square protests of 1989.

=== Memorial ===
On September 11, 1989, one hundred days after Jiang's death, Ding Zilin and Jiang Peikun took Jielian's ashes home. In front of his ash box, Jiang Peikun carved the following inscription for his son:

In these short 17 years
You lived like a real man
Your humanitarian nobility and integrity
Will be kept in the undying memory of history.
Your forever loving Father and Mother.

Liu Xiaobo, the winner of 2010 Nobel Peace Prize, wrote a bereavement poem to commemorate Jiang while he was visiting Jiang Peikun and Ding Zilin on June 1, 1991.

Your Seventeen Years

I, live
and with my share of infamy
have not the courage, nor the right
to come bringing flowers or words
before your seventeen-year-old smile
...

== See also ==
- List of Chinese pro-democracy activists – List of pro-democracy activists from China
