= June 4th Memorial Association =

Exhibit of 1989 demonstrations and crackdown in China

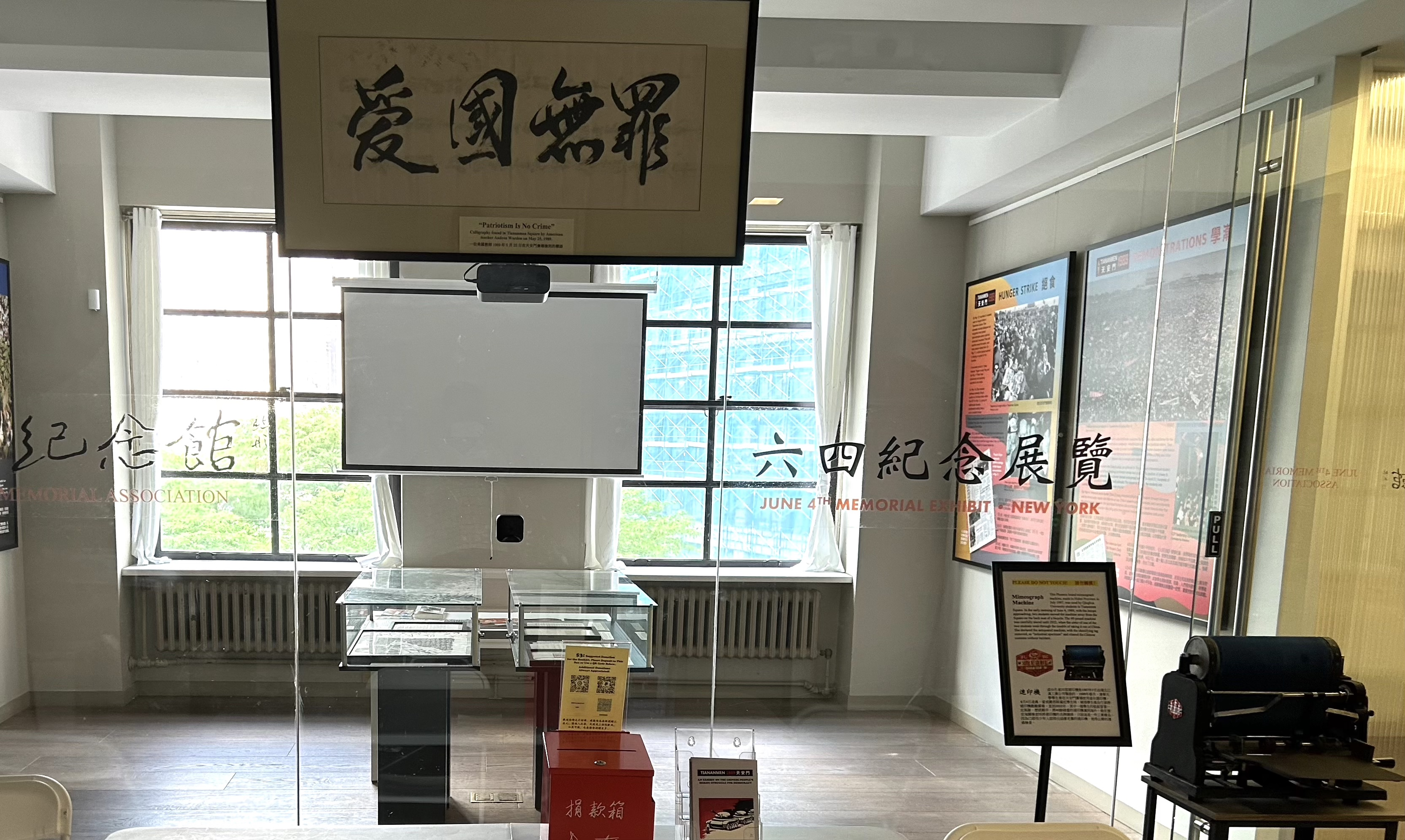
View of the June 4th Memorial Exhibit from the vestibule off the elevators, showing narrative boards, display cases and a mimeograph machine

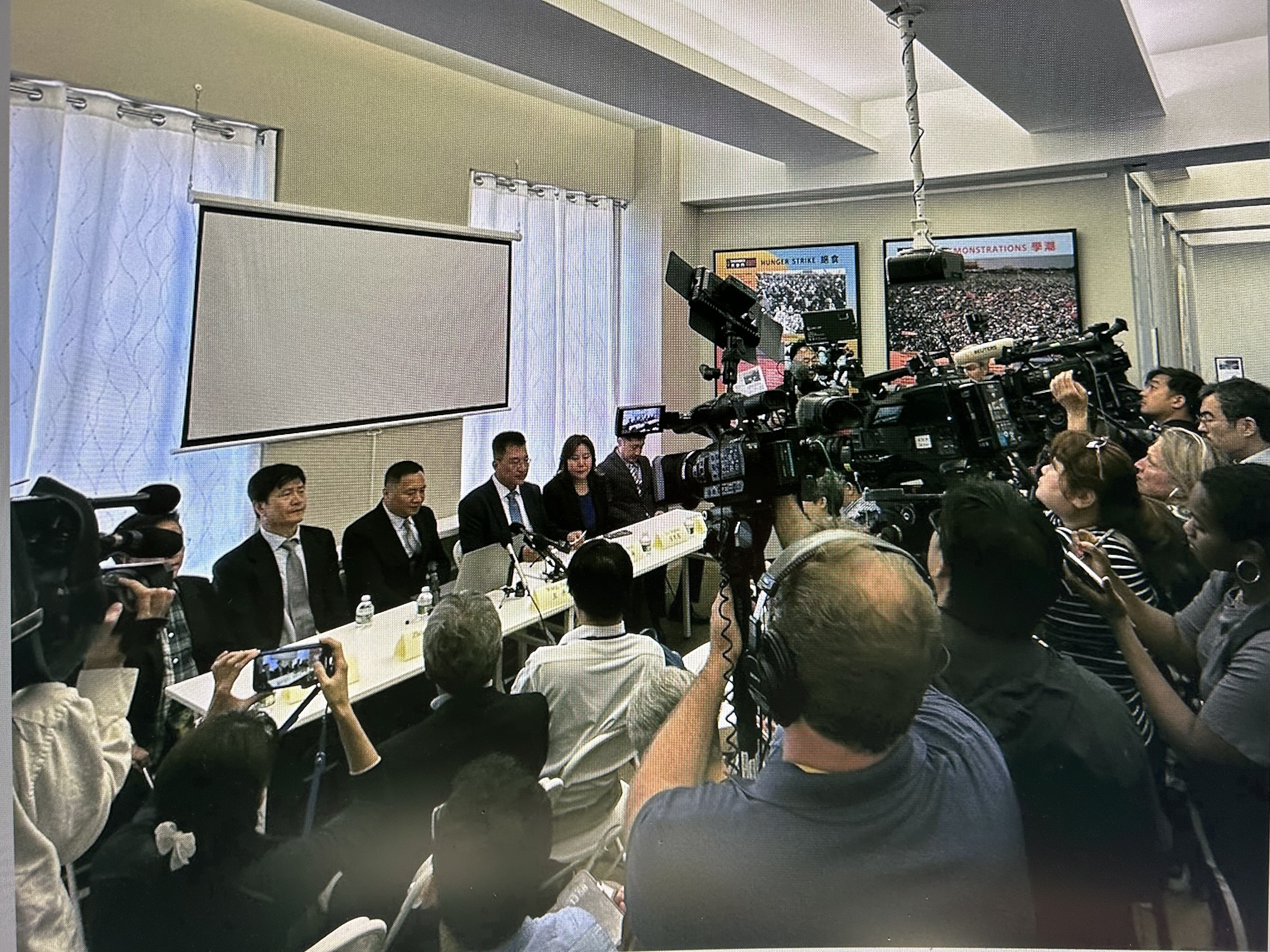
Press conference on the opening of the June 4th Memorial Exhibit, June 1, 2023. Seated from left: Liqun Chen, Fengsuo Zhou, Dan Wang, David Yu, Jinghua Lu, Yan Jin

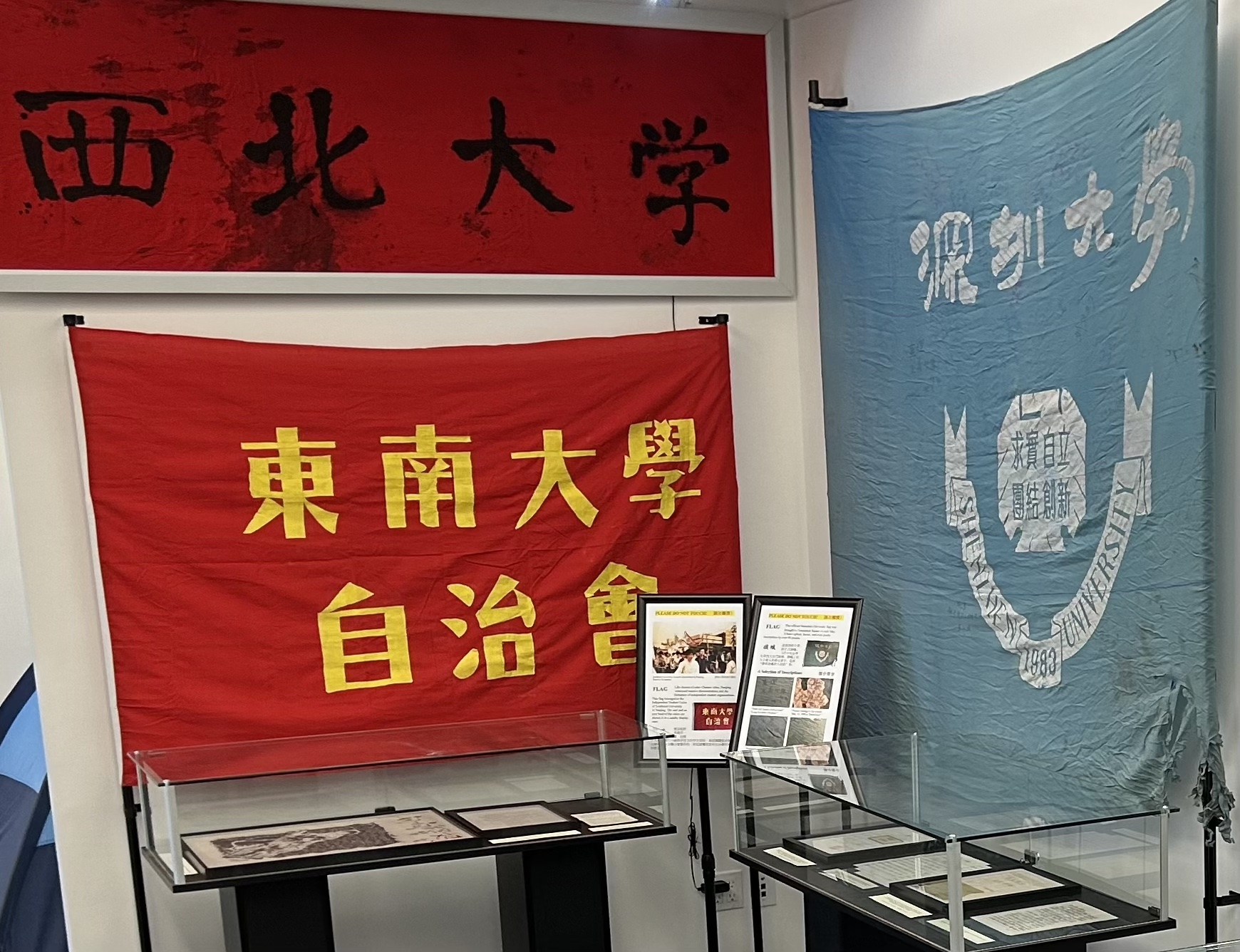
Items from 1989 on display at June 4th Memorial Exhibit

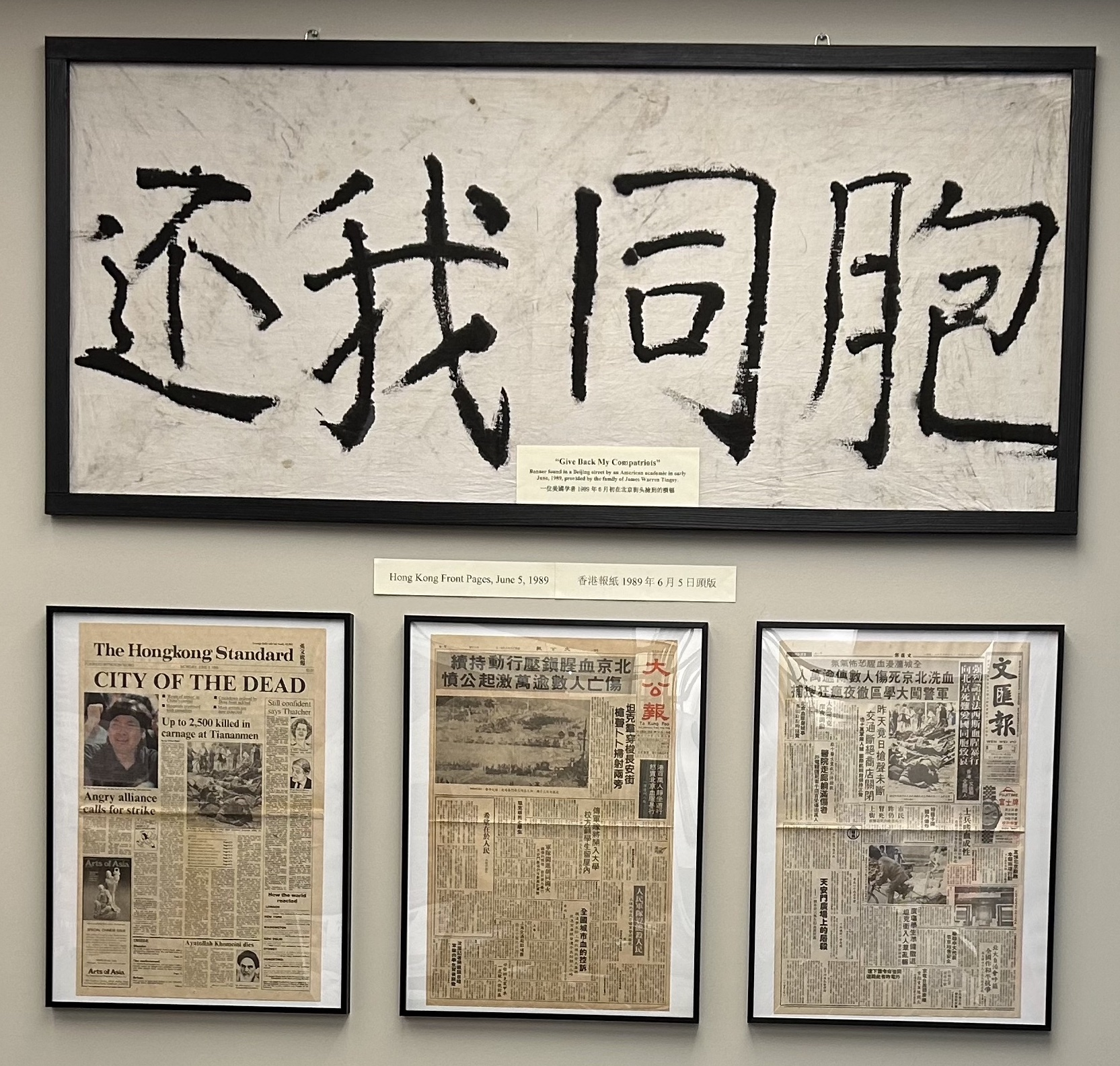
More items from 1989 on display at June 4th Memorial Exhibit

The June 4th Memorial Association (full name: June 4th Massacre Memorial Association Inc.; abbreviation: 64MA; Chinese traditional: 六四紀念館 or 六四紀念協會; Chinese simplified: 六四纪念馆 or 六四紀念协会) is an all-volunteer nonprofit organization incorporated in the State of New York on September 14, 2021. Its main activity is the curation of the June 4th Memorial Exhibit (colloquially: June 4th Memorial Museum or June 4th Museum; Chinese traditional: 六四紀念展覽, 六四紀念博物館 or 六四博物館; Chinese simplified: 六四紀念展览, 六四纪念博物馆 or 六四博物馆) in New York City.

== Background ==
In the spring of 1989, massive pro-democracy demonstrations broke out in Beijing and other Chinese cities. On June 3 to 4, 1989, by the order of the Chinese government, heavily armed soldiers set their aim on the demonstrators in Beijing, killing and wounding thousands of them. The crackdown is known as the June 4th Massacre. To memorialize the events of 1989, a June 4th Museum was established in Hong Kong in 2012. Following the imposition of the Hong Kong National Security Law, the museum was forced to close on June 1, 2021, shortly before the 32nd anniversary of the massacre. The museum was shuttered permanently by the Hong Kong police in September 2021. In the aftermath of the closing, Dan Wang, a student leader of the 1989 demonstrations, proposed the creation of a June 4th Museum in New York City and incorporated 64MA. At an online press conference on January 10, 2022, he released 64MA's formal proposal, titled "Never Forget, Never Give Up". This called for the production of a temporary exhibit on the June 4th Massacre at the Victims of Communism Museum (VOC Museum) in Washington, DC in 2022 and, if funds permitted, the establishment of a permanent exhibit in New York as early as 2023.

The exhibit at the VOC Museum, which is part of the Victims of Communism Memorial Foundation (VOC), opened on June 3, 2022. Titled Tiananmen 1989, it included a set of large narrative boards. Many photos on these boards were provided by Liu Jian, who had kept his large stash of photos from 1989 private for 30 years. The exhibit also included numerous items from the 1989 protests, notably a shirt worn by army reporter Jiang Lin that had become blood-soaked on June 4, 1989. The exhibit was well received. In his recorded remarks to the opening of 64MA's New York exhibit on June 2, 2023, Andrew Bremberg, President of VOC, observed that the Tiananmen 1989 exhibit had been viewed by thousands of people.

== Current exhibit ==
By September 2022, 64MA had received over $500,000 in donations, enough to set up a permanent exhibit in New York in rented premises. The largest donation by far, $120,000, came from a businessperson in China who took part in the 1989 demonstrations. In December 2022, the temporary exhibit at the VOC Museum came to a close. After renting a venue in Midtown Manhattan in early 2023, 64MA produced an expanded version of the exhibit at the VOC Museum. Among the new items on display are a mimeograph machine used by the students in Tiananmen Square to print flyers, a military canteen that fell into the hands of Beijing residents during their scuffle with the soldiers in the evening of June 3, 1989, and a banner that was used to bind bullet wounds and became blood soaked. The exhibit also includes a small gallery dedicated to Hong Kongers' Defiance (1989–2019).

The new exhibit, simply titled June 4th Memorial Exhibit, held an opening ceremony on June 2, 2023. The ceremony and the exhibit were widely reported by the media. The exhibit opened to the public on June 25, 2023, and received good reviews. Some well-known public figures, including members of U.S. Congress Mike Gallagher and Ashley Hinson, have visited the exhibit.

David Yu, executive director of 64MA, explained at the opening ceremony of the New York exhibit that, while it is 64MA's goal to build a museum, the exhibit is strictly speaking not a museum, because it does not satisfy all the requirements for operating a museum in New York State. However, many people, including many journalists, continue to refer to the New York exhibit as a museum.

== See also ==
- Hong Kong Alliance in Support of Patriotic Democratic Movements of China
- June 4th Museum
