= Hong Kong national security legislation =

Hong Kong national security legislation may refer to one of the following laws/bills:

== Laws in force ==
- 2020 Hong Kong national security law, a national law of China
- Safeguarding National Security Ordinance, a 2024 local law of Hong Kong

== Withdrawn bill ==
- National Security (Legislative Provisions) Bill, a 2003 withdrawn local legislation proposal in Hong Kong

== Basis for legislation ==
- Article 23 of the Hong Kong Basic Law, a 1997 national law of China
- Decision of the National People's Congress on Establishing and Improving the Legal System and Enforcement Mechanisms for the Hong Kong Special Administrative Region to Safeguard National Security, a 2020 congressional decision of China
