= June 4th Museum =

Museum in Hong Kong

- 六四紀念館
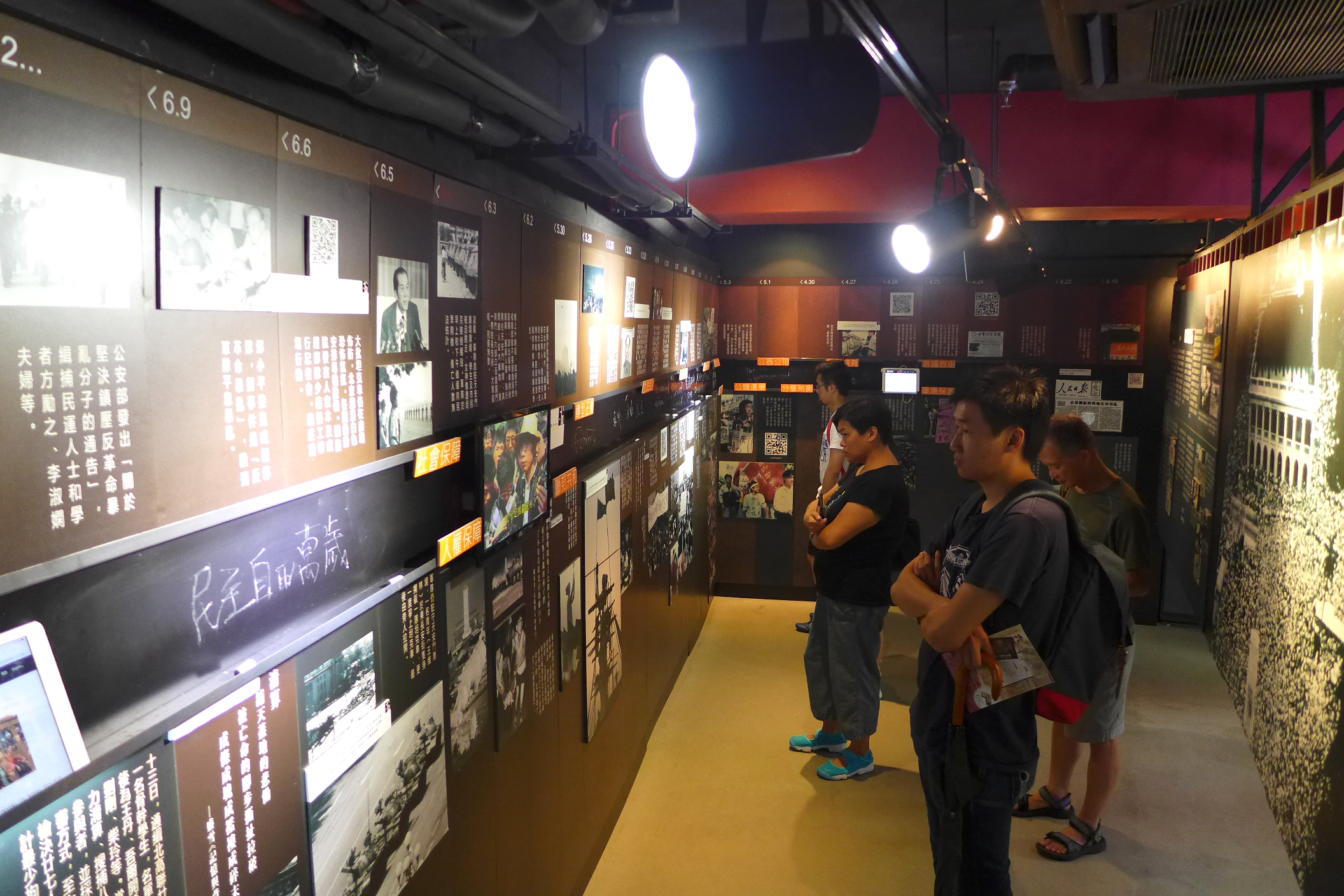
- Historical gallery.
- Established: 26 April 2014
- Dissolved: 2021
- Location: No. 10, Ngai Wong Commercial Building, 11–13 Mong Kok Rd, Mong Kok, Kowloon, Hong Kong
- Type: Private
- Founder: Hong Kong Alliance in Support of Patriotic Democratic Movements of China

June 4th Museum
- Traditional Chinese: 六四紀念館
- Simplified Chinese: 六四纪念馆
Transcriptions
Standard Mandarin
- Hanyu Pinyin: Liù Sì Jìniànguǎn
Yue: Cantonese
- Yale Romanization: Luhk sei géi nihm gún
- Jyutping: Luk6 sei3 gei2 nim6 gun2

The June 4th Museum, organised by the Hong Kong Alliance in Support of Patriotic Democratic Movements in China, was a museum commemorating the 1989 Tiananmen Square protests and massacre that occurred in Beijing, China.

The museum was first located in a 1,375 sq ft. space in Tsim Sha Tsui, Hong Kong. It opened on 26 April 2014, shortly before the 25th anniversary of the incident. However, the museum received many complaints from the building owners, with regard to breaches of the mutual covenant of the building. The museum closed on 11 July 2016.

New premises were found to house the museum in a commercial premises in Mong Kok and the museum reopened on 26 April 2019. The museum was once again closed on 2 June 2021 following a government probe into the museum's licensing status.

== Purpose ==
The purpose of the museum was to give Chinese people, in particular residents from mainland China, an opportunity to learn more about the Tiananmen Square protests of 1989, the history of which is censored in China. Local residents could have also explored the history of democracy and freedom in China.

== Museum ==
Previous homes of the collection

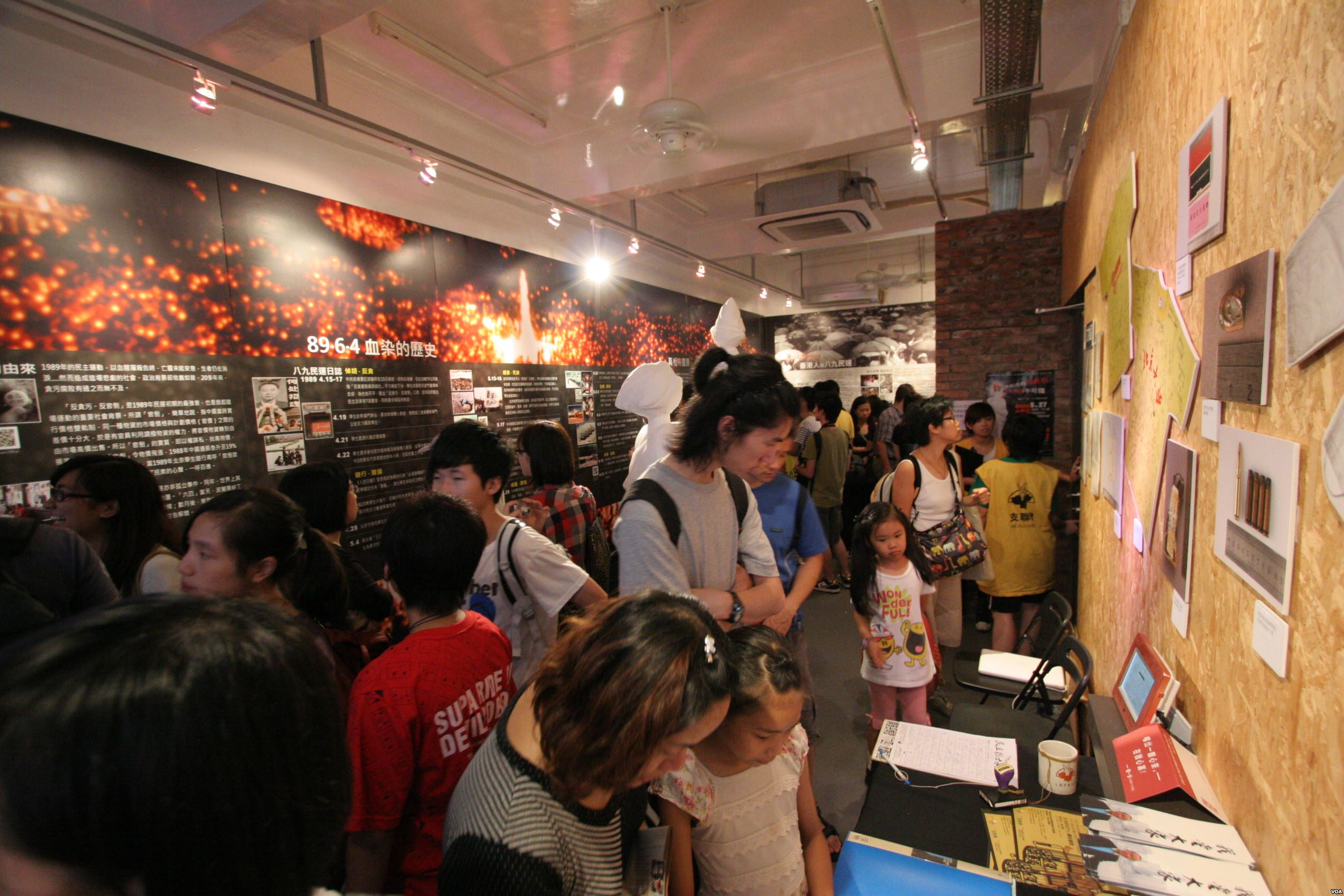
First temporary museum

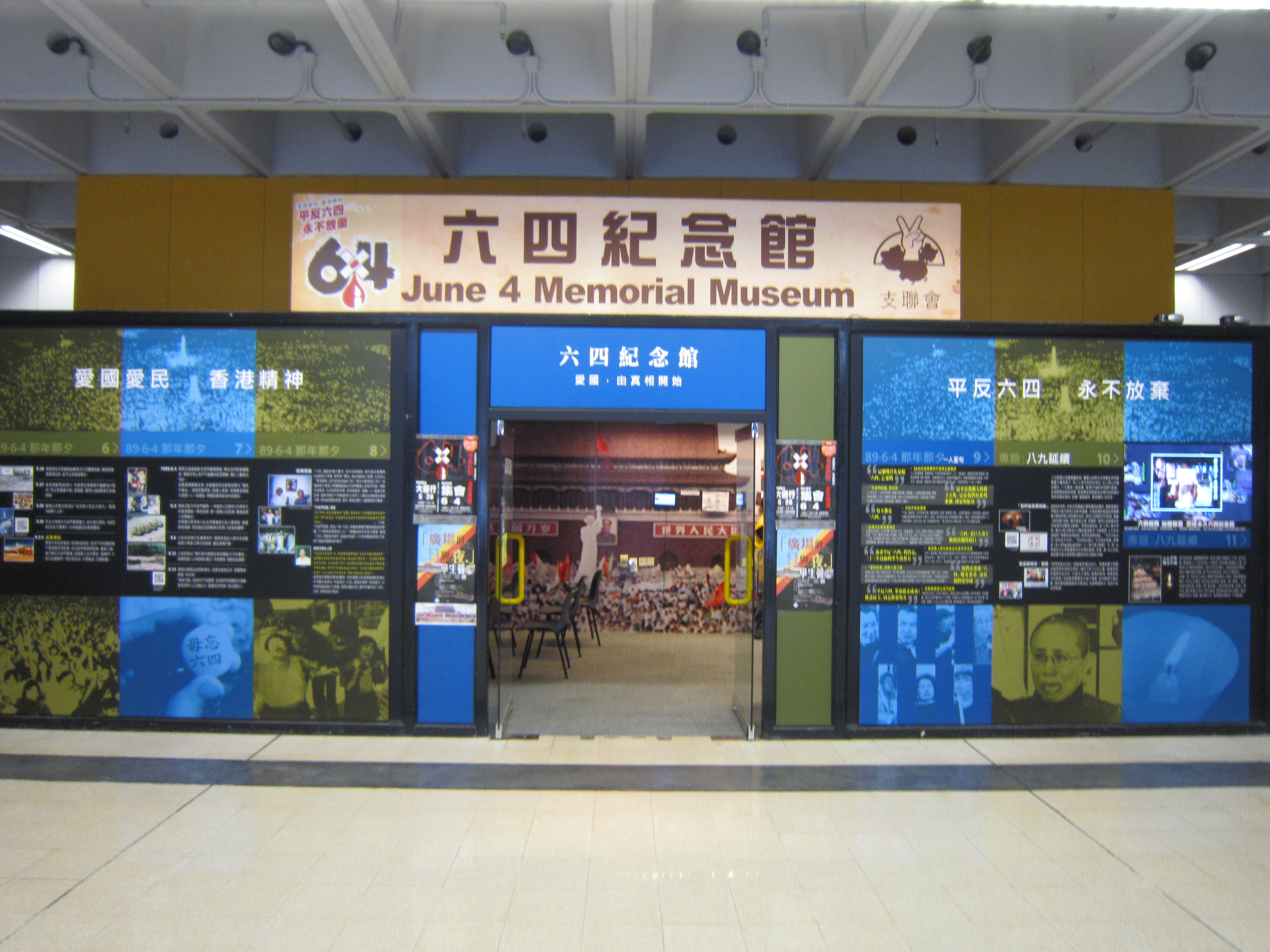
Second temporary museum

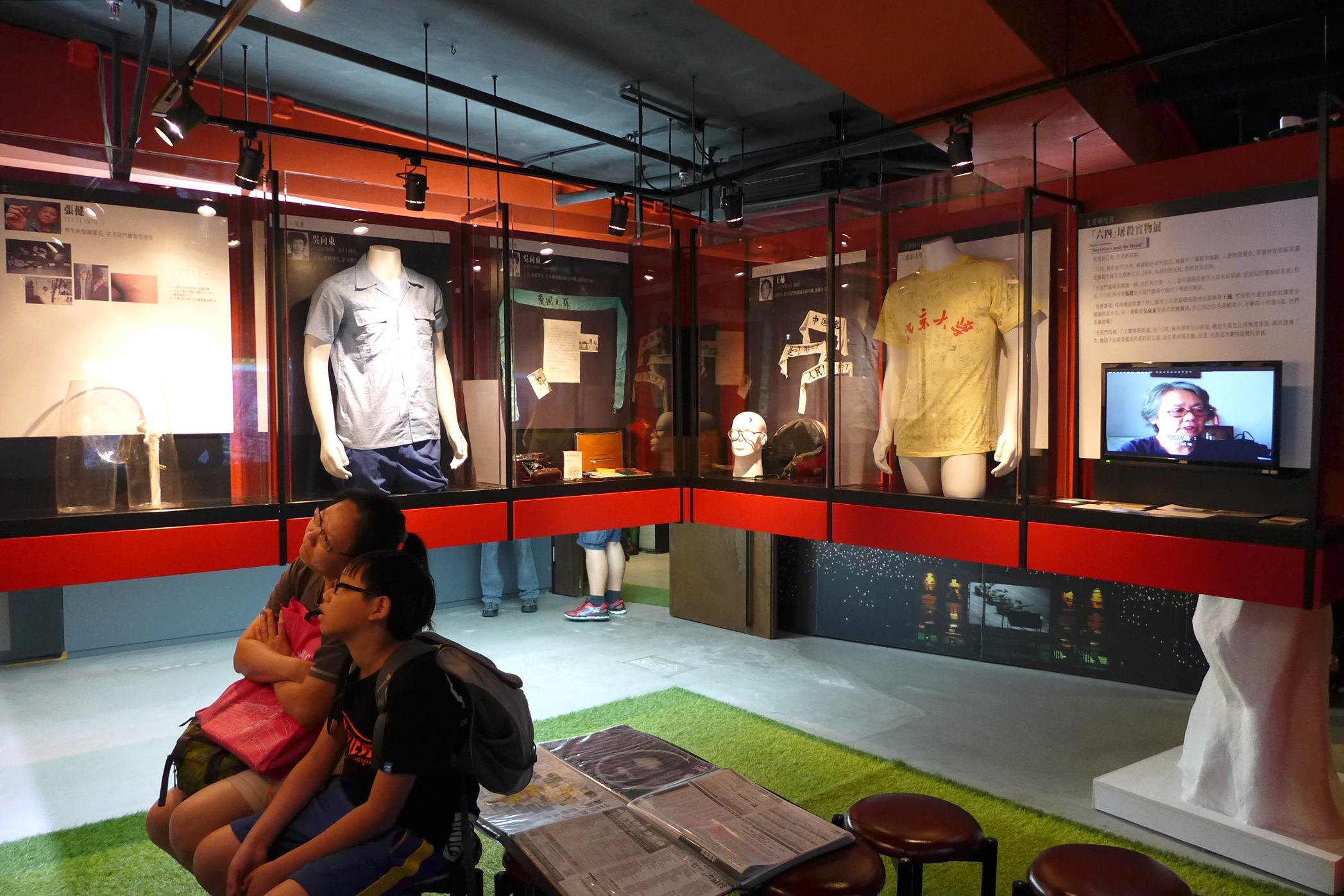
Tsim Sha Tsui museum

=== Temporary museums (2012–2013) ===
Before the permanent museum first opened in 2014, there were two temporary museums open for short periods—the first in 2012 and then in 2013. The temporary museums were named 4 June Memorial Museum (六四紀念館), hosted by the Hong Kong Alliance in Support of Patriotic Democratic Movements in China. The first temporary museum was located at 269 Yu Chau Street, Sham Shui Po, Hong Kong, and was open between 29 April and 10 June 2012. The second was located at I-Café in the City University of Hong Kong from 12 April through 15 July 2013.

=== Tsim Sha Tsui location (2014–2016) ===
The permanent site was on the fifth floor of the Foo Hoo Centre at 3 Austin Avenue in Tsim Sha Tsui in Hong Kong. The owner of the site is the non-government organization Hong Kong Alliance in Support of Patriotic Democratic Movements in China. Costing 9.76 million Hong Kong dollars, the museum was named the 4 June Museum in English, the Chinese name (Chinese: 六四紀念館) being the same as that used for the temporary museums. It opened to the public on 26 April 2014. The museum occupied 800 square feet, and its budget was approximately HK$800,000 per year.

A complaint was filed against the museum shortly before it opened by the corporation that owns the building housing it, claiming that the museum violated the building covenants, as it was not using the space as an office and would bring in an excessive number of visitors. A lawsuit over the matter was funded not by the owning corporation but "privately" by its chairman. In June 2015, the building management began demanding personal information from museum visitors, who reportedly felt "harassed" by security guards. Albert Ho, chairman of the Alliance, alleged that the fight against the museum was "politically motivated", and that the museum's detractors appeared to have "unlimited resources". In light of the above challenges, the museum closed on 11 July 2016.

=== Temporary museum (2017) ===
While searching for a permanent location in which to re-establish the museum, a temporary museum was opened in the Jockey Club Creative Arts Centre in Shek Kip Mei, Kowloon on 30 April 2017. It hosted a series of related events surrounding 4 June 2017 and closed down on 15 June.

In 2018, the Alliance undertook a search for permanent premises in hopes of re-opening the museum before 4 June 2019.

=== Mong Kok location (2019–2021) ===
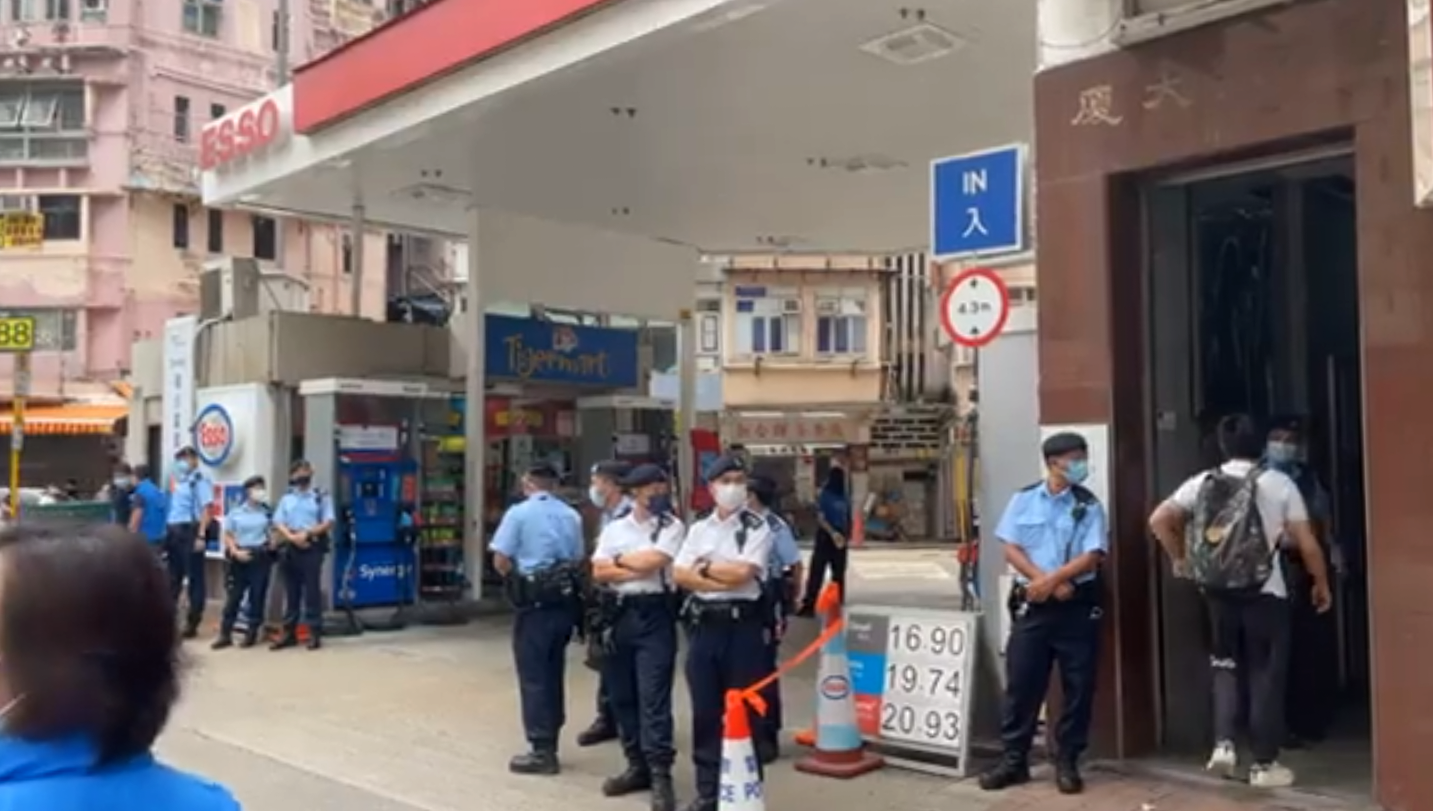
9 September 2021, National Security Department of the Hong Kong Police Force going to the June Fourth Memorial Hall to search for evidence

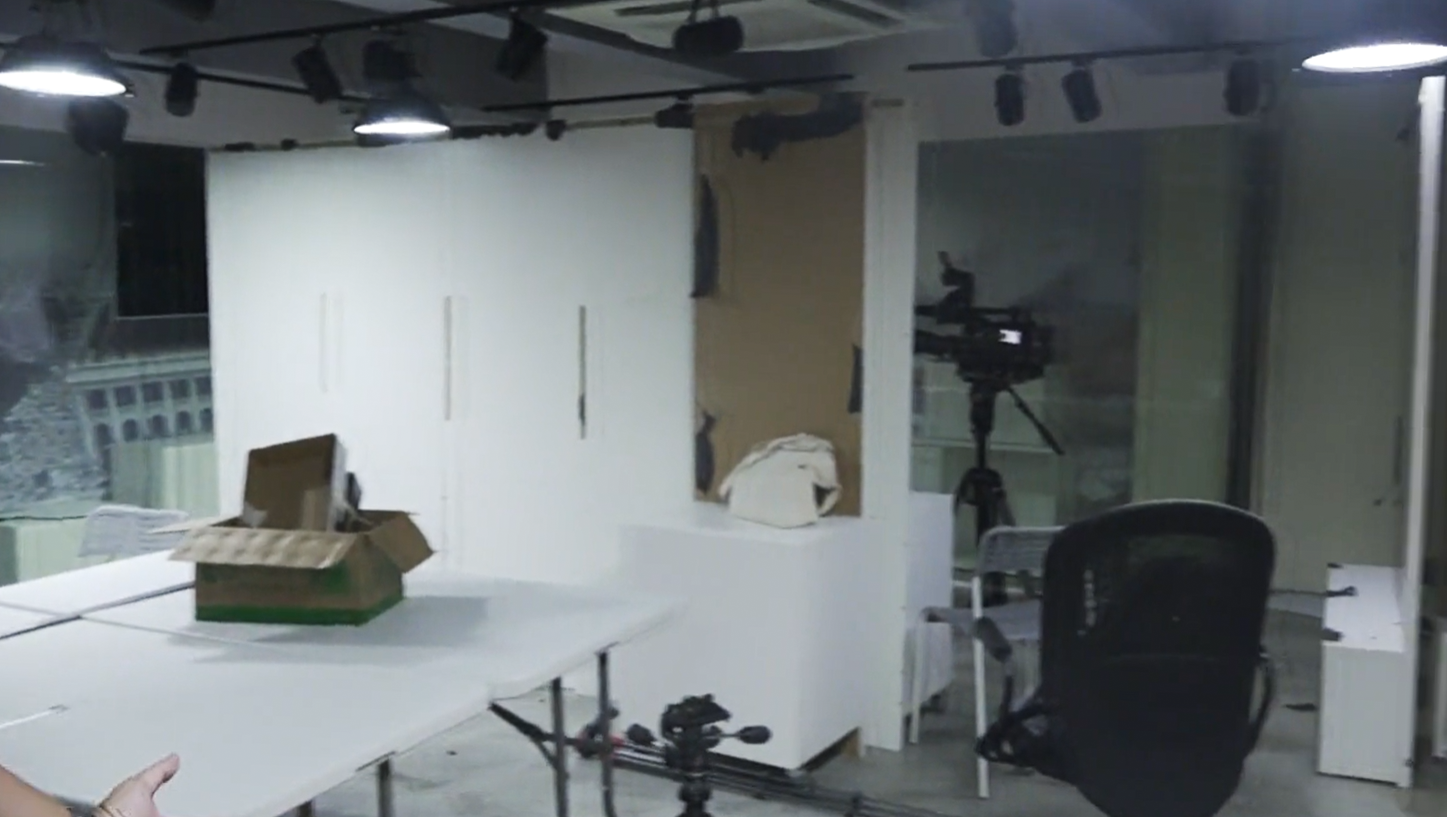
Most of the exhibits and books were taken away by police

The Alliance purchased premises in Mong Kok in December 2018. About HK$1 million was spent renovating the space to house the museum on a permanent basis. The museum was broken in to and vandalised prior to opening. The Alliance subsequently increased security at the premises. The new museum location opened on 26 April 2019. The museum closed from December 2020 until late February 2021 due to the COVID-19 pandemic in Hong Kong. The curator of the museum said that the Hong Kong government and national security department had not interfered with the operation of the museum after the imposition of the Hong Kong National Security Law, which had come into force on 30 June 2020.

The Food and Health Department (FEHD) on 1 June 2021 raided the museum and initiated proceedings alleging that the museum had violated the Places of Public Entertainment Ordinance by operating without a licence. The museum closed and sought legal advice.

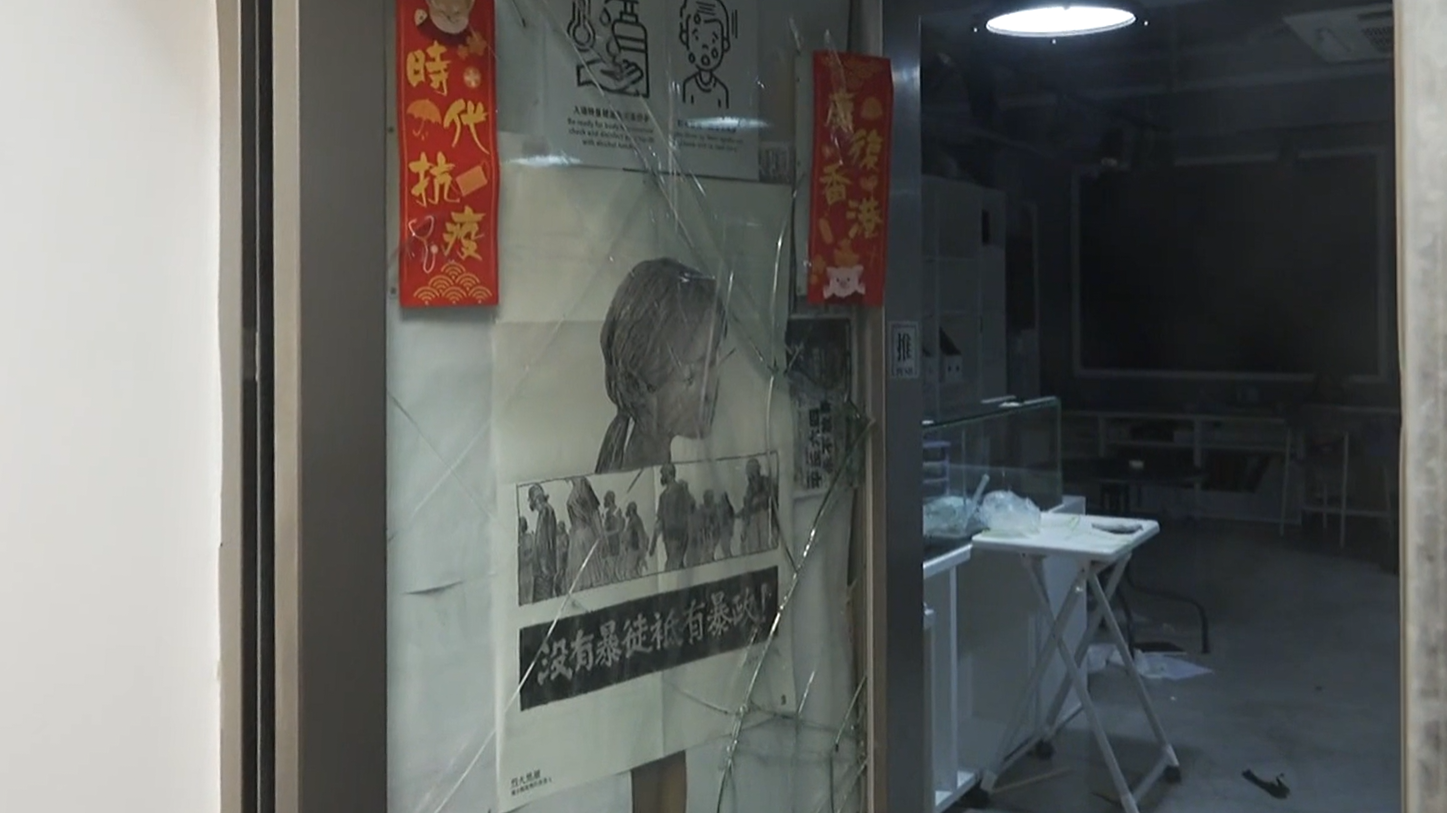
Entrance damage after the police investigation

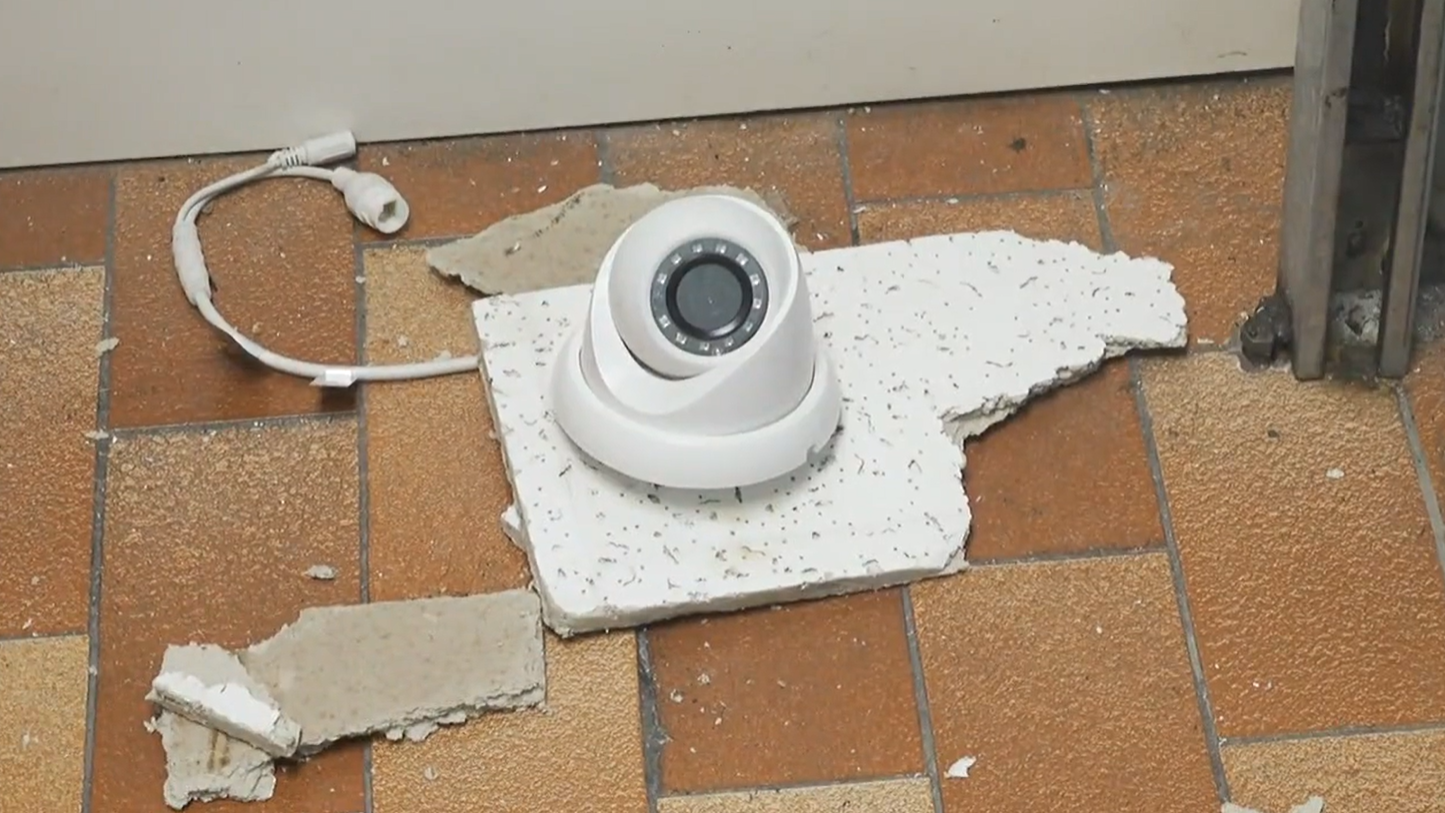
Entrance CCTV damage after the police investigation

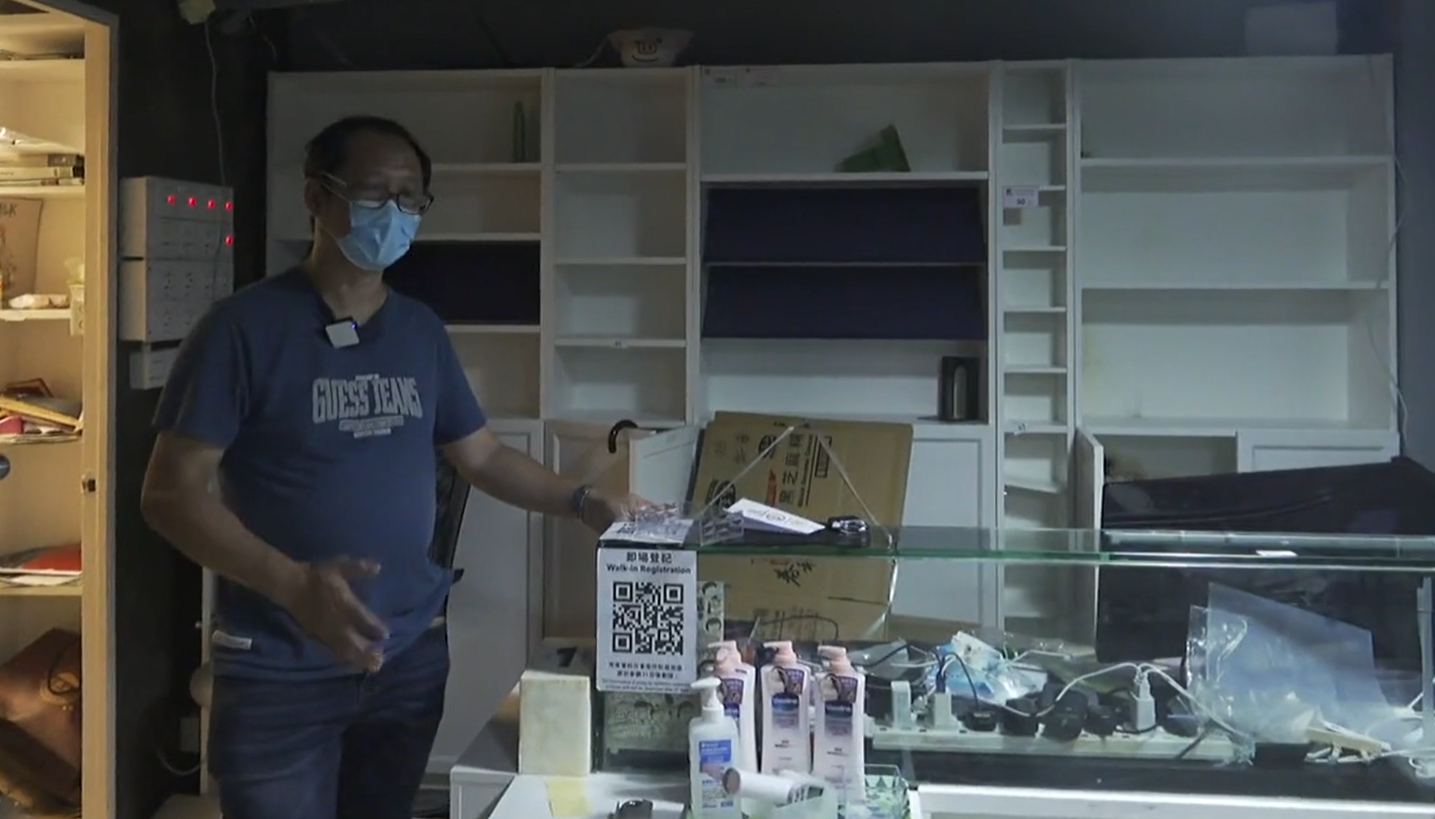
Reception desk empty after the police investigation

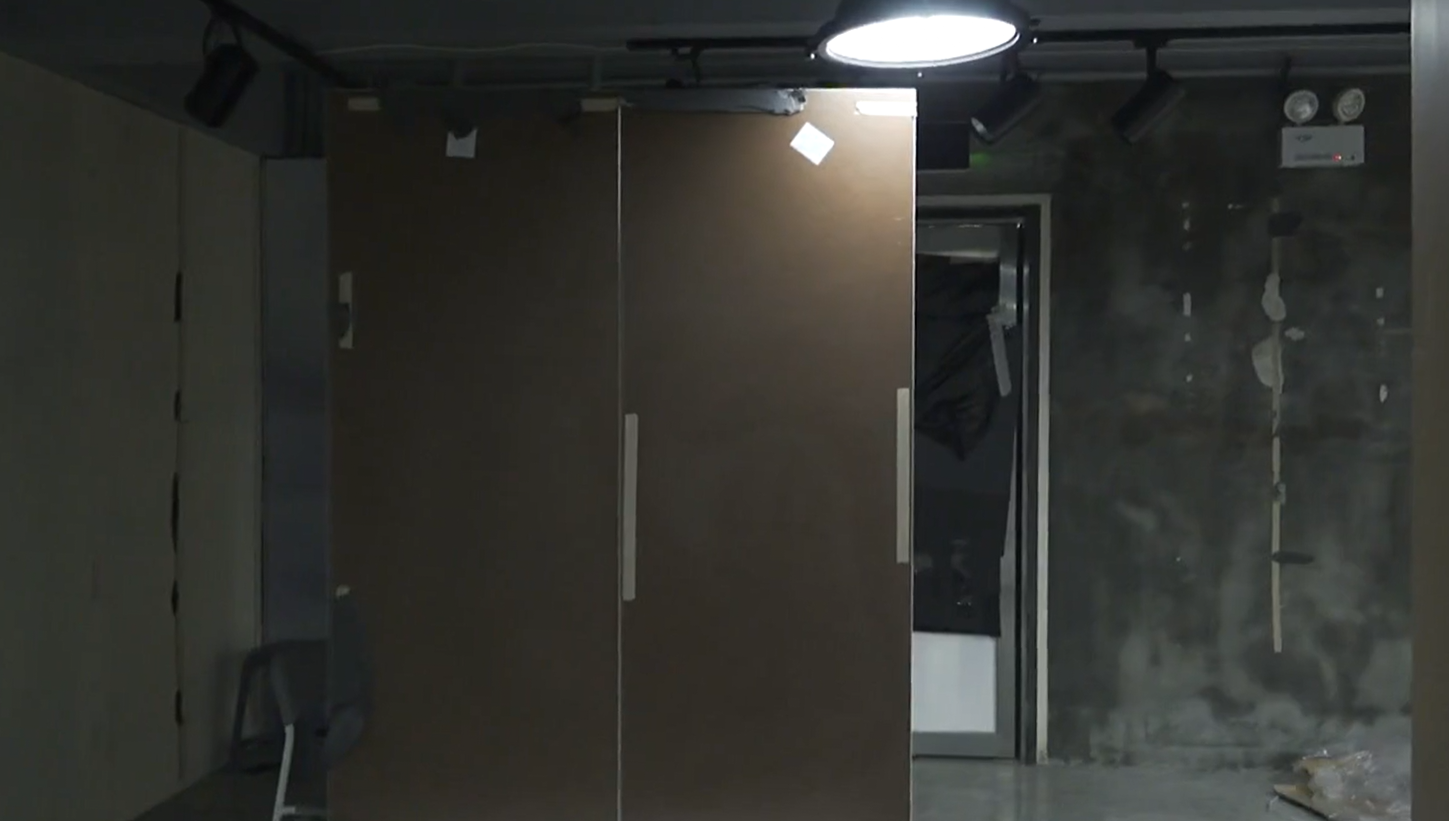
Exhibition board removed by police

== Exhibits ==
The museum collection consisted of artifacts, photographs and information related to the incident. These include the casings of rounds fired by the People's Liberation Army in Tiananmen Square and a raincoat which was worn by a resident of Hong Kong who went to Beijing to support the Democracy Movement. The museum also contains T-shirts signed by the student leaders including Wang Dan and Chai Ling. The museum provided a multi-media area, heritage area, history area and a library. A Goddess of Democracy statue, which at 6 feet 4 inches (1.93 m) in height symbolizes 4 June, was to have been displayed in the permanent museum.

A bottle of home-made liquor billed as "Eight Liquor June Four" – the word "liquor" (酒) is a homonym of "nine" (九) and sold for 89.64 yuan – all symbolising for the crackdown date was produced in 2016 by four activists in Sichuan. The bottle's label depicted "Tank Man" image from 1989, and boasted of being aged 27 years (for the 27th anniversary in 2016) with 64 percent proof. Although the product was seized, one bottle that survived was smuggled out of the country made a symbolic trip around the world, to the Middle East, France, the US and eventually Hong Kong, where it was put on display in the museum. On 4 April 2019, the fourth of four Sichuan men who were arrested in 2016 for producing the liquor was sentenced to jail for 3 1/2 years; the three other men were also charged with "picking quarrels and provoking trouble", but were instead given suspended sentences.

With the future the museum seen as uncertain by museum staff including manager Lee Cheuk-yan after the imposition of the Hong Kong National Security Law, a fundraiser was started to preserve the exhibits in digital format.

== See also ==
- June 4th Memorial Association
