= Tiananmen Mothers =

Group of Chinese democracy activists

- Founded: September 1989
- Founder: Ding Zilin
- Type: NGO
- Website: http://www.tiananmenmother.org/

The Tiananmen Mothers (Chinese: 天安門母親; pinyin: Tiān'ānmén mǔqīn) is a Chinese pro-democracy organization founded in September 1989 by Ding Zilin, alongside Jiang Peikun and Zhang Xianling. It advocates for change in the government's position over the 1989 Tiananmen Square protests and massacre.

== Formation ==
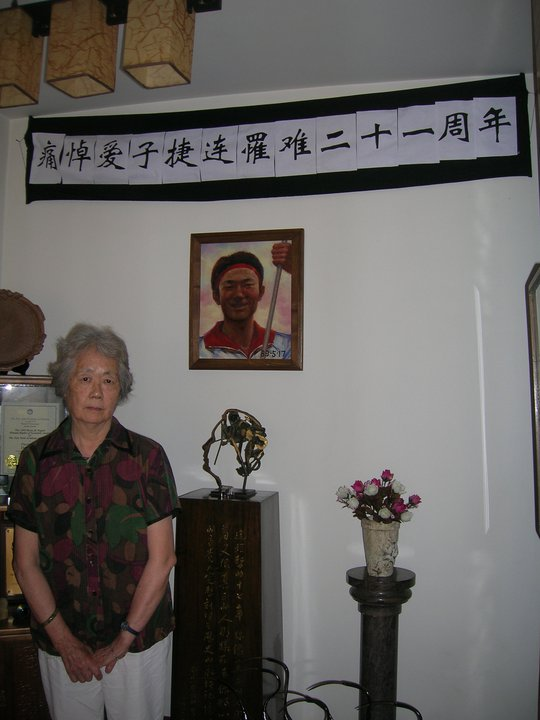
Ding Zilin, founder and leader of the Tiananmen Mothers

Prior to June 1989, Ding Zilin was a philosophy professor at the People's University and a member of the Chinese Communist Party (CCP). On June 3, 1989, her 17-year-old son Jiang Jielian was killed on his way to Tiananmen Square. In September, the Tiananmen Mothers was founded with Ding as its leader. The government had put her under surveillance and Ding experienced harassment from authorities as she met with other members of the organisation. Ding described the organisation as "a common group of citizens brought together by a shared fate and suffering".

"I cannot turn a blind eye to the pain of those who suffer my same fate. As a group, they have been forgotten and forsaken by society. I made the firm decision to continue in my mission of locating and helping June Fourth families, until the government itself actively takes up this project and there is no longer any need for our efforts."

—Ding Zilin

Despite the expansion of the group, many Chinese intellectuals had kept away from the movement, as they did with the Democracy Wall movement in the late 1970s. One exception was Wu Zuguang, who advocated a reversal of the governments position at a meeting of the Chinese People's Political Consultative Conference in 1997, and he did not suffer any repercussions for his comments because of his age. Other members of the group included prominent student Jiang Qisheng, a graduate of the Beijing Institute of Aeronautics who became head of the Beijing Student Autonomous Federation which acted in conjunction with other universities and formed part of a delegation that met with Chinese Premier Li Peng to try and resolve the Tiananmen protests peacefully. He was jailed for 18 months and upon his release in February 1991, was denied regular employment.

In a May 1991 interview with ABC, Ding and Zhang Xianling condemned the crackdown and in particular Li Peng.

Ding's regular public campaigning, including public petitions and lawsuits against the government, saw her expelled from the party in May 1992, and both Ding and her husband, also a professor at the university, were forced into retirement in 1993. The Tiananmen Mothers movement has also inspired other families of political prisoners to campaign for their release. Since then, a few dozen families meet together regularly on every anniversary of the crackdown, despite government intimidation. Ding and other members have occasionally been detained by authorities as a result of their actions.

Tiananmen Mothers has received considerable support from international sources since its founding, particularly Human Rights in China (HRIC), as well as other non-governmental organizations including Humanitarian China and Tso Ming Sing Foundation, who made donations to the Mothers group in June 2016. Some donations and funds from overseas have been frozen by Chinese authorities.

== Campaign ==
=== Demands ===
The Tiananmen Mothers group put forward a five-point demand to the Chinese government in relation to the protest:

- The right to mourn peacefully in public;
- The right to accept humanitarian aid from organizations and individuals inside and outside China;
- No more persecution of victims, including those injured in the shootings and the families of the dead;
- The release of all people still in prison for their role in the 1989 protests; and
- A full, public investigation into the crackdown

The group also wants the Chinese government to name the dead, compensate families and punish those responsible. The government made a payout of 70,000 yuan for the first time in 2006 to the family of one of the victims. The move was welcomed by Zilin, though she said it was unlikely to indicate a change in the government's position.

=== Public appeals ===
The Tiananmen Mothers have made many public appeals, challenging the government. They protested to the National People's Congress, the Chinese People's Political Consultative Conference, the judiciary and the population. The group has also opened up contacts with UN Human Rights Council and foreign media, issuing a video demanding the government reassess Tiananmen. On the tenth anniversary, despite memories of the event fading due to strong government censorship, Jiang Qisheng, who had since been released, drafted a letter along with fifteen others appealing for quiet commemoration by lighting candles in cities across China. He played a major role in organising the event, posting flyers on lampposts calling on the population to "light a myriad of candles to collectively commemorate the brave spirits of June Fourth" and as a result, several petitions to hold protest were submitted, but were rejected by government authorities. Jiang was arrested on shortly before the anniversary; in court on November 1, 1999, he defended himself, maintaining he was exercising freedom of speech and recalling a previous reversal of the government's term "counterrevolutionary" after the Gang of Four and Cultural Revolution. He urged the government not to imprison people for expressing their views, "Simply by writing and talking, do I commit such a crime against heaven that I must be put to death?" and his lawyer, Mao Shaoping argued that the group's activities did not amount to "subversion of state power". Jiang was charged and released from prison on May 19, 2003.

Despite Jiang's arrest, Ding remained undeterred. On June 4, 1999, the group presented a petition signed by 108 relatives to the Supreme People's Procuratorate, asking for a legal ruling on the deaths of the protestors. The petition contained evidence they had collected including testimonies and names of the dead and injured. They asserted that they were exercising their political rights, and not engaging in any illegal activities. The movement still continues, receiving warnings not to commemorate and undergoing increased surveillance around June 3–4 every year. An increasing number of dissidents and former intellectuals from the party, including Hu Yaobang's former secretary and Huang Qi have joined the group, and have been expelled from the establishment as a result.

In 2009, the organisation urged the government to "break the taboo" surrounding the incident. The Tiananmen Mothers website is blocked by internet censors in China.

=== Arrests ===
Ding Zilin, Zhang Xianling, and Huang Jinping were detained by Chinese authorities in March 2004 for engaging in what were described as illegal activities sponsored by overseas forces. They were released later in the week but remained under close surveillance in the run-up to the 15th anniversary of the protests.

=== Newspaper advert controversy ===
On June 4, 2007, the Chengdu Evening News ran a one-page line commemorating the Tiananmen Mothers, stating, "Saluting the strong mothers of June 4th victims." Officials at the newspaper refused to answer questions regarding the advert. It was later suggested that the person who ran the advert was unaware of the significance of 6/4, instead being told it was related to a mining disaster that took place. Three editors were later fired from the paper.

== See also ==
- Black Sash
- Human rights in the People's Republic of China
- Mothers of the Plaza de Mayo
- Women in Black
- Ladies in White
- Mothers of Beslan
- Mothers of Khavaran
- Women's roles during the 1989 Tiananmen Square protests and massacre

== Bibliography ==
Books

- Carrabine, Eamon; Cox, Pamela; Lee, Maggy; South, Nigel & Plummer, Ken (2009). "Victim movements - examples from around the world" in Criminology: A Sociological Introduction. Taylor & Francis. ISBN 978-0-415-46450-5.
- Goldman, Merle. (2005). From Comrade to Citizen: The Struggle for Political Rights in China. Harvard University Press. ISBN 978-0-674-01890-7.
- Peerenboom, Randall. (2007). China modernizes: threat to the West or model for the rest? Oxford University Press. ISBN 978-0-19-920834-0.
- Stichele, Caroline & Penner, Todd. (2005). Her Master's Tools?: Feminist and Postcolonial Engagements of Historical-critical Discourse. Society of Biblical Literature. ISBN 978-1-58983-119-3.
- Tai, Zixue. (2006). The Internet in China: Cyberspace and Civil Society. CRC Press. ISBN 978-0-415-97655-8.

News reports

- Chengdu Evening News editors fired over Tiananmen ad, Reuters, June 7, 2007.
- China makes 1989 Tiananmen payout, BBC News, April 30, 2006.
- China told to end Tiananmen taboo, BBC News, February 27, 2009.
- Human Rights Defender, Ding Zilin, under house arrest in China, Human Rights Defenders, July 6, 2004.
- Fifteenth Anniversary of the Tiananmen Square Massacre, Wordpress.org, June 4, 2004.
- Mother Courage, TIME, April 5, 2004.
- Newspaper Ad Salutes Tiananmen Mothers, Washington Post, June 7, 2007.
- Tiananmen mothers press for answers, Vancouver Sun, June 4, 2008.
