= Human Rights in China (organization) =

International non-governmental organization

- Abbreviation: HRIC
- Founded: March 1989
- Founder: Han Dongfang
- Type: NGO
- Headquarters: 85 Broad Street, FL 17, New York, NY 10004-2783, USA
- Location: New York, U.S.
- Executive Director: Zhou Fengsuo
- Website: www.hrichina.org/en

Human Rights in China (simplified Chinese: 中国人权; traditional Chinese: 中國人權; pinyin: Zhōngguó Rénquán) is a New York-based international, non-governmental organization (NGO) that addresses human rights and fundamental rights in China. It is a member organization of the International Federation for Human Rights. According to Fang Lizhi, HRIC adopts an independent and non-political approach.

== History ==
Founded in March 1989 by Chinese students and scholars, HRIC provides analysis and information on human rights issues in China and advocates on behalf of individuals in China. In 2005, HRIC was a Tech Award Laureate recognized by The Tech Museum of Innovation for its use of technology.

HRIC has offices in Hong Kong and New York City. It also hosts the Robert L. Bernstein Fellowship in International Human Rights, a program in partnership with the New York University School of Law.

HRIC's Executive Director is Zhou Fengsuo (2023–present). Its former executive directors include Sharon Hom (2002–2023) and Xiao Qiang (1991–2002).

In July 2026, the organization was sanctioned by the Chinese government, which accused HRIC of supporting the Uyghur Forced Labor Prevention Act.

== Activities ==
HRIC publishes reports and briefings on a range of human rights issues in China.

The organization also addresses technological, legal, and administrative reform issues through individual advocacy as well as systemic and policy interventions. HRIC's programs and reports primarily focus on rights issues affecting China's rural population, migrant workers, ethnic minorities, women, and children.

HRIC also translates some important laws from Mainland China and Hong Kong to provide resources for civil society actors to support the promotion and exercise of fundamental rights.

=== Domestic Advocacy ===
HRIC's work within China includes providing legal representation and assistance to activists. HRIC collaborates with domestic Chinese groups and advocates for the Chinese government to reassess the 1989 Tiananmen Square protests and massacre.

HRIC supports domestic groups such as the Tiananmen Mothers and facilitates connections between activists in China and international discussions, including efforts such as lifting the European Union arms embargo on China. HRIC's online June 4 Archive documents the history of the 1989 Tiananmen Square protests and massacre. It also maintains Fill the Square, an online petition supporting the Tiananmen Mothers' demands.

=== International Advocacy ===
HRIC participates in discussions on human rights policies. It provides briefings and reports to the United Nations bodies, International Conferences, the WTO processes, and the EU-China Dialogue. As of 2006, HRIC had submitted over 40 cases of alleged human rights abuses to the UN subsidiary Working Group on Arbitrary Detention; 13 of these cases resulted in decisions, all of which deemed the detentions arbitrary.

HRIC has outlined practices for IT companies operating in China regarding policies on the use of information technology and surveillance.

=== Online Advocacy ===
HRIC operates a proxy server designed to circumvent the Great Firewall, providing access for users in China. It also publishes a bi-weekly journal.HRIC: The project includes six websites featuring online Chinese publications and advocacy resources.

== Funding ==
HRIC is funded by private foundations and individuals. It has received support from groups including the National Endowment for Democracy, Open Society Institute, the International Center for Human Rights and Democratic Development, the European Human Rights Foundation, Human Rights Watch, and Asia Watch. In 2006, the New York University School of Law established the Robert L. Bernstein Fellowship in International Human Rights, which supports a fellowship with HRIC.

== See also ==
- Human rights in the People's Republic of China
- Gao Wenqian
