= List of Chinese pro-democracy activists =

List of pro-democracy activists from China

This is a list of Chinese pro-democracy activists who have advocated for political reform, democracy, human rights, freedom of expression, and government accountability in the People's Republic of China and Hong Kong. Many have participated in protest movements, legal advocacy, civil society initiatives, or political organisations, and some have been imprisoned, exiled, or subjected to state repression.

== List ==
=== Deceased ===
- Bao Zunxin
- Cao Shunli
- Chen Ziming
- Ding Zilin
- Fang Lizhi
- Liu Binyan
- Liu Xiaobo
- Szeto Wah
- Wang Ruowang
- Yang Xingfo
- Zhao Ziyang

=== Incarcerated ===
- Albert Ho
- Benny Tai
- Cao Haibo
- Chow Hang-tung
- Cyd Ho
- Ding Jiaxi
- Gao Zhisheng
- Guo Feixiong
- Guo Quan
- Gordon Ng
- Huang Qi
- Ilham Tohti
- Jimmy Lai
- Jimmy Sham
- Jeffrey Andrews
- Joshua Wong
- Lee Cheuk-yan
- Leung Kwok-hung
- Li Qiaochu
- Lü Gengsong
- Ni Yulan
- Owen Chow
- Peng Lifa
- Qin Yongmin
- Tan Zuoren
- Tony Chung
- Wang Bingzhang
- Wu Chi-wai
- Xu Zhiyong
- Yu Wensheng
- Zhao Changqing

=== In exile ===
- Agnes Chow
- Ai Weiwei
- Albert Cheng
- Alex Chow
- Baggio Leung
- Chen Guangcheng
- Chai Ling
- Chen Pokong
- Chloe Cheung
- Denise Ho
- Dennis Kwok
- Dolkun Isa
- Elmer Yuen
- Feng Congde
- Finn Lau
- Frances Hui
- Guo Jian
- Han Dongfang
- Li Hongkuan
- Li Lu
- Liu Gang
- Mo Li Hua
- Nathan Law
- Shen Tong
- Sheng Xue
- Tang Baiqiao
- Ted Hui
- Teng Biao
- Tiffany Yuen
- Victor Ho
- Wang Chaohua
- Wang Dan
- Wang Juntao
- Wang Youcai
- Wei Jingsheng
- Wu'er Kaixi
- Xiong Yan
- Xu Wenli
- Yan Jiaqi
- Yang Jianli
- Yu Jie
- Yuan Hongbing
- Zhou Fengsuo

=== Residing in China ===
- Alvin Cheng
- Claudia Mo
- Deanie Ip
- Emily Lau
- Figo Chan
- Fu Xiancai
- He Weifang
- Hu Jia
- Huang Xueqin
- Joseph Zen
- Jeremy Tam
- Lau Siu-lai
- Li Datong
- Li Wei-ling
- Liu Xianbin
- Lü Banglie
- Mao Yushi
- Pu Zhiqiang
- Ran Yunfei
- Roy Tam
- Wang Xizhe
- Wong Yuk-man
- Yang Chunlin
- Yang Zili
- Yao Lifa
- Yeung Sum
- Zhao Lianhai
- Zhang Xianling

== Pro-democracy organizations ==
- Chinese Alliance for Democracy
- Civil Human Rights Front
- Democracy Party of China
- Federation for a Democratic China
- Hong Kong Alliance in Support of Patriotic Democratic Movements of China
- Hong Kong Parliament (exiled organisation)
- Independent Federation of Chinese Students and Scholars
- New Citizens' Movement
- Open Constitution Initiative
- Tiananmen Mothers

== See also ==
- 2020 Hong Kong pro-democracy primaries
- 2025 Macanese legislative election
- 21 Most Wanted Beijing Student Leaders
- Beijing Students' Autonomous Federation
- Barefoot lawyer
- Democracy in Hong Kong
- Democracy movements of China
- Human rights in China
- Kelbinur Sidik – advocate for the persecuted Uyghurs in China
- Lennon Wall (Hong Kong)
- List of Chinese dissidents
- List of Hong Kong national security cases
- List of pro-democracy protests in China
- Michael Pang – was Pro-democracy camp (Hong Kong) but switched to Pro-Beijing camp (Hong Kong) after being incarcerated
- Operation Yellowbird – British Hong Kong operation to help the Tiananmen protesters escape arrest
- Protest and dissent in China
- Storming of the Legislative Council Complex in 2019
- Tank Man
- The Fifth Modernization – poster and essay that called on the CCP to add democracy to the list of the Four Modernizations
- Transnational repression by China
- Weiquan movement
