= List of Chinese dissidents =

This list consists of activists who are known as Chinese dissidents. The label is primarily applied to intellectuals and other high-profile individuals from China who are known for their criticism of the Chinese government or its policies.

== Detained and jailed people ==
Many Chinese political activists have been detained or jailed or exiled for their pro-democracy or rights defending activities. They include the following notable activists.

Name	Occupation	Detained	Allegations	Sentence	Notes
Ai Weiwei	artist and activist	2011	alleged economic crimes	Fine of 2.4 million for tax evasion	Detained for 80 days from 3 April to 22 June 2011
Bao Tong	government official	1989	revealing state secrets and counter-revolutionary propagandizing	7 years	Sentenced in 1992. Prison from 1989–1996. Later died in 2022.
Bao Zunxin	historian	1989	counterrevolutionary propaganda and incitement	5 years	Sentenced in 1991. Released in 1992. Later died in 2007.
Cai Lujun	businessman, writer	2003	incitement to subversion	3 years	Released in 2006, sought political asylum in Taiwan in 2007.
Cao Shunli	lawyer, human rights activist	2013	illegal assembly, picking quarrels and provoking trouble		Died in detention in 2014.
Chen Pokong	author, commentator, democracy activist	1989; 1993	"carrying out counter-revolutionary propaganda and incitement", illegally crossing state borders	3 years, 2 years	Sentenced in 1989 and 1993.
Cheng Jianping	online activist	2010	disturbing social order	1 year	Reeducation through labor for a sarcastic post on Twitter.
Gao Zhisheng	lawyer	2006	disturbing public order	5 yrs suspended	Illegally detained and tortured in 2007; forcibly removed from family home in Shaanxi in 2009. 'Disappeared' by government in 2009, reappeared in 2010. The Chinese foreign minister claimed a prison sentence was for 'subversion'.
Guo Quan	professor	2008	subversion of state power	10 years	Sentenced in 2009. Awaiting appeal.
Hao Jinsong	law professional, activist	2019	picking quarrels and provoking trouble, fraud	9 years and a fine of 350,000 yuan	Sentenced in 2023.
He Depu	writer	2002	"incited subversion" on the Internet	8 years	Sentenced in 2003. Released in 2011.
Hu Jia	activist	2007	inciting subversion of state power	3.5 years	Arrested, imprisoned, and sentenced in 2008. Released in 2011.
Huang Qi	webmaster, anti-human trafficking activist	2000	inciting subversion	5 years	Sentenced in 2003. Accused of violating articles 103, 105, 55 and 56. Released in 2005.
Huang Qi	webmaster, anti-human trafficking activist	2008	illegal possession of state secrets	3 years	Sentenced in 2009. Arrested after essay regarding the Sichuan earthquake. Released in 2011.
Ilham Tohti	economist	2014	inciting subversion	life	Detained in January 2014 after criticizing Beijing's response to 2013 Tiananmen Square attack.
Jiang Lijun	writer	2002	inciting subversion of the state power	4 years	Sentenced in 2003. Arrested for "Internet writing and publishing dissident articles". Also sentenced to 'deprivation of political rights' for 1 year.
Jiang Rong	writer	1989			Released 1991.
Jiang Yanyong	doctor	2004			Detained and released in 2004. Broke story on SARS epidemic. Wrote critical letter regarding Tiananmen.
Jiang Yefei	political cartoonist	2015	incitement to subversion	6 and a half years	Escaped from China to Thailand in 2004, he was granted political asylum by the Canadian Government, but was arrested by Thailand Immigration authorities on illegal entry. In November 2015 he was deported from Thailand at the request of the Chinese authorities. On July 13, 2018 he was sentenced to six and a half years. As of July 30, 2022 he has been released after serving his sentence.
Lei Chen	civil servant, journalist	1960	incitement to subversion	10 years	Member of the Control Yuan and expelled from the Kuomintang in 1954. Released in 1970 by the Kuomintang government and died on 7 March 1979. Posthumously exonerated by the Transitional Justice Commission in 2019.
Li Hai	student	1994		9 years	Sentenced in 1995. Released in 2004.
Li Zhi	civil servant	2003	inciting subversion	8 years	Sentenced in 2003. Yahoo! helped the government against him. Expected release in 2011.
Liao Yiwu	writer, musician	1990	poem "Massacre" about Tiananmen Square	4 years, permanent blacklist from travel	Under a 2011 'travel ban' for 'national security' reasons.
Liu Di	student	2002			Released in 2003
Liu Xiaobo	professor of literature	2008	inciting subversion of state power	11 years	Sentenced in 2009. Died on 13 July 2017. Recipient of the 2010 Nobel Peace Prize.
Qin Yongmin	human rights activist	1998; 2018	inciting subversion of state power	12 years 13 years	Sentenced 1998 and July 2018. Co-founder of the Democracy Party of China.
Qiu Zhanxuan	student activist	2019	unknown, likely because he was the leader of the Marxist student association at Peking University	unknown	Qiu was abducted on 29 April 2019 by State security agents on the outskirts of Beijing. He was the leader of the Marxist student association at the elite Peking University, a communist of conscience who defied the Chinese Communist Party. He remains missing.
Ren Zhiqiang	tycoon, blogger	2020	purported corruption	18 years	Sentenced in 2020.
Ruan Xiaohuan	blogger, InfoSec specialist	2021	inciting subversion of state power	7 years	Sentenced in 2023.
Shi Tao	journalist, writer, poet	2004	illegally supplying state secrets to overseas organizations	10 years	Sentenced in 2005. Yahoo! helped the government against him. Released 2013.
Tan Zuoren	writer	2008		3 years	Sentenced in 2009.
Tan Zuoren	writer	2010	subversion of state power	5 years	Sentenced in 2010.
Tang Baiqiao	activist	1989	spreading counterrevolutionary propaganda; inciting counterrevolutionary activities; defection to the enemy; treason.	3 years	Released under international pressure in 1991. Fled to Hong Kong, then United States in 1992.
Wang Bingzhang	doctor	2002	spying, terrorism	life	Sentenced in 2003.
Wang Dan	professor of history	1989	Tiananmen activities	4 years	Sentenced in 1991. Released on parole in 1993.
Wang Dan	professor of history	1995		11 years	Sentenced in 1996. Released on medical parole to United States in 1998 and currently in Taiwan.
Wang Quanzhang	lawyer	2015	subversion of state power	4½ years	Put on trial in December 2018, sentenced in January 2019.
Wang Xiaoning	engineer	2002	incitement to subvert state power	10 years	Sentenced in 2003. Yahoo! helped the government against him. Expected release in 2012
Wang Youcai		1989			
Wang Youcai		1998	subversion	11 years	Released and exiled in 2004. Currently in the United States.
Wei Jingsheng	electrician	1979	passing military secrets	15 years	Released and jailed again in 1993 and released for "medical reasons" and deported to the United States in 1997.
Wu Gan	blogger	2015	subversion of state power	8 years	
Xu Zhiyong	lawyer, lecturer	2014	gathering crowds to disrupt public order	4 years	For his role of founding New Citizens' Movement and in protests.
Xu Zhangrun	constitutional lawyer and lecturer	2020	using prostitutes	one week	
Yang Jianli	activist, scholar	2002	alleged espionage & illegal entry	5 years	The Chinese government placed Yang on a 1994 blacklist of 49 pro-democracy activists barred from returning to China. Yang used another person's passport to enter China in 2002.
Yu Wensheng	lawyer	2020	inciting subversion of state power	4 years	According to Yu's wife Xu Yan, he was also deprived of his citizens' rights for three years.
Yuan Hongbing	jurist, writer	1994			Detained and forced to leave China in 1994. Travelled to and sought political asylum in Australia in 2004.
Yue Xin	student activist	2018	unknown, likely in response to protests organized by Yue	unknown	Yue went missing in October 2018, after she and fifty other students were detained by Chinese authorities after participating in Jasic Incident. She remains missing.
Zeng Jinyan	blogger	2006	suspected of harming state security		Under house arrest with husband Hu Jia from August 2006 – March 2007 and under house arrest again from May 2007; released later
Zhao Changqing	teacher of history	1989	Tiananmen activities		Released after about 1/2 year.
Zhao Changqing	teacher of history	1998	workers rights activity	3 years	
Zhao Changqing	teacher of history	2002	attempted subversion of state power	5 years	Sentenced in 2003.
Zhao Lianhai	food safety worker, activist	2009	inciting social disorder	2.5 years	Sentenced in 2010.

== Others ==
- Michael Anti (journalist), proponent of freedom of the press in China
- Chai Ling
- Chang Ping
- Chaohua Wang
- Chen Guangcheng
- Dong Yaoqiong
- Fang Lizhi
- Feng Congde
- Feng Zhenghu
- Gao Xingjian, recipient of the 2000 Nobel Prize in Literature
- Gao Yu (journalist)
- Gao Zhisheng
- Gui Minhai, publisher and writer of books on Chinese politics
- Guo Wengui, also known as Miles Guo
- Han Dongfang
- Jiao Guobiao, former professor of Peking University and the author of Denouncing the Central Propaganda Department (of the Communist Party of China)
- Li Hongkuan
- Li Hongzhi, founder and leader of Falun Gong
- Li Lu
- Li Qiaochu
- Lin Zhao, critic of Mao Zedong, executed during the Cultural Revolution
- Li Zehou, scholar of philosophy and intellectual history
- Liu Binyan
- Alex Liu (Yongchuan Liu), data scientist
- Lu Jinghua, former merchant who became involved in the Beijing Workers' Autonomous Federation in 1989. She later lived in New York. Attempted to return to Beijing in June 1993 but was refused entry and sent back to US.
- Murong Xuecun, writer and critic of censorship
- Shen Tong
- Su Changlan
- Su Xiaokang
- Tang Baiqiao
- Tashi Wangchuk, sentenced to 5 years in prison in May 2018 for "inciting separatism" after speaking to The New York Times about his concerns over the current state of Tibetan culture and language in China.
- Teacher Li Is Not Your Teacher
- Wang Bingzhang
- Wang Meiyu (王美雨), democracy activist who died in police custody under suspicious circumstances in September 2019 after having been arrested for "picking quarrels and provoking trouble" in July 2019 when he was protesting for universal suffrage and calling for the resignation of Xi Jinping and Li Keqiang
- Wang Ruowang
- Harry Wu
- Wu'erkaixi
- Xie Wanjun, founding member of the Democracy Party of China
- Xiong Yan (dissident)
- Xu Jiatun
- Xue Fei (host)
- Yan Jiaqi
- Yang Jianli
- Youming Che
- Yu Jie, dissident writer
- Zhang Boli
- Zheng Yi (writer)
- Zhou Fengsuo
- Weiping Qin

== See also ==
- Anti-communism in China
- Chinese intellectualism
- Tank Man
- Human rights in the People's Republic of China
- Liberalism in China
- Politics of the People's Republic of China
- 1989 Tiananmen Square protests and massacre
- Women's roles during the 1989 Tiananmen Square protests and massacre
- Liu Xiaobo
- Xinjiang re-education camps
