= Local Committee of China Democracy Party =

Political party banned in the People's Republic of China

The Local Committee of China Democracy Party (LCCDP) (Chinese: 中国民主党地方委员会; pinyin: Zhōngguó Mínzhu Dǎng Difang Weiyuanhui) is a special committee of the China Democracy Party (see List of Political Parties) with the aim of starting democratic reform in local government in the People's Republic of China. The party was banned by the Chinese Communist Party (CCP). The Local Committee of CDP was established by Zheng Cunzhu, a former student leader in Anhui province in 1989 and a secret CDP member in China since 2001.

== History ==
=== Foundation of CDP ===
While the earliest date listed for the founding to be June 25, 1998, the group registered the party on June 28, 1998, when Bill Clinton was visiting China. Wang Youcai, one of the main activists during the 1989 Tiananmen protest along with Wang Donghai and Lin Hui went to the Civil Public Affair Hall of Hangzhou in Zhejiang Province to officially register this party. The registration was declined.

=== Communist Party response ===
The next day on June 29, 1998, Wang was arrested by the state police at his own home in front of his family members. He was charged with creating opposition against the Chinese government. His trial began on December 18, he had no lawyer defense, his trial lasted only a few hours. He was sentenced on December 21, 1998, to 11 years of imprisonment and three years of deprivation of political rights for subversion.

On the same day, Xu Wenli, a 55-year-old member was also sentenced to 13 years for overthrowing the Communist party.

On December 22, 1998, Qin Yongmin was sentenced to 12 years to prison for harming state security.

Li Peng, Chairman of the Standing Committee of the National People's Congress at the time proclaimed, "If a group is designed to negate the leadership of the Communist Party, then it will not be allowed to exist."

The Communist party declared the CDP an illegal organization, followed by a crackdown in Beijing in 1998. After the sentencing on December 23, 1998, the Supreme People's Court then declared that, "anyone who knowingly publishes, prints, copies, or distributes material containing incitement to overthrow state power and the socialist system or split the country" could be tried for crimes. Such charges could result in life sentences for film directors, computer software developers, writers and artists, and media and publishing personnel, all of whom are subject to the new directive.

=== Crackdown on other members ===
There were hundreds of CDP members that were detained, arrested, and sentenced to prison. Liu Xianbin, Wu Yilong, Gao Hongmin, Zha Jianguo, Mao Qinxiang, Zhu Yufu, Zhuzhengming, Liu Shizhun, Xu Guang, She Wanbao, Chen Shuqing, are some of the members of the party. Cyber dissident He Depu was also arrested in a correction facility.

=== Disunion of CDP ===
==== Two different ways ====
There were two main ways to establish the China Democracy Party in 1998, one was represented by the founder Wang Youcai and the other Xu Wenli. Wang Youcai tried to register the party according to the constitution which protects freedom of association, but Xu Wenli just proclaimed the establishment of the party without registration. Wang Youcai is the leader of rational way while Xu Wenli the radical.

==== First organization of China Democracy Party in the USA ====
Most of the CDP founders in 1989 were arrested but Mr. Xie Wanjun, the founder of the Party in Shandong province fled to the USA and later established China Democracy Party Foundation in New York. Two new groups were established later by Mr. Wang Jun and Mr. Liu Dongxing who worked together with Xie Wanjun before they built their own CDP groups.

==== CDP Overseas Headquarter ====
Later Xu Wenli was exiled to the US on December 24, 2002. Without discussing with Xie Wanjun to build a united Party, Xu Wenli established a new group: CDP Oversea Headquarter and his party did not collaborate with Xie Wanjun's party. This was the start of dissociation of CDP.

==== Coordinative Service Platform of China Democracy Party ====
Wang Youcai was exiled to the USA on March 4, 2004. He established China Democracy Party Coordinative Service Platform which supported by the members of China Democracy Party members who are in China, overseas students, and exiled China Democracy Party Members.

==== No United Central Committee of CDP ====
Because there was no chance for CDP founders to have a meeting for the establishment of united Central Committee of China Democracy Party in 1998, because there were two different ways at the beginning, because the founders in exile could not collaborate in the USA, China Democracy Party can not be established as a united party. There exist several parties claiming to be the "headquarters" or "Central Committee", but actually they do not control each other but develop independently.

In January 2008, party member Zheng Cunzhu established the Local Committee of China Democracy Party in Los Angeles. Zheng Cunzhu was a former student leader during 1989's pre-democratic movements in Anhui province, and he published an open letter to the leaders of China to advocate the restarting of political reform.

The Local Committee of CDP will try to establish China Democracy Party in the local cities and prefer the local practice of democracy. There are two cities in California: Los Angeles and San Francisco having an office of LCCDP.
