= Wang Wanxing =

Wang Wanxing Chinese: 王万星
- Born: 10 October 1949; Beijing
- Known for: Democracy advocate

Wang Wanxing (Chinese: 王万星, born 10 October 1949) is a prominent Chinese pro-democracy activist who was a prisoner of conscience for 13 years in Chinese detention centres and psychiatric institutions called Ankang. Wang was the only person to have been discharged from such an institution to a Western country. In 2005, he was released and now lives in exile in Germany.

== Biography ==
Wang's parents were a labourer and an office worker. Wang grew up during the Cultural Revolution, and attended a middle school in Beijing. His activism was influenced by the death of his grandmother, who starved to death in a rural famine.

In 1968, the communist authorities sent him to a collective farm in Heilongjiang, a province next to the Russian border.

=== Activism ===
Whilst in the collective farm, he wrote a personal letter to Mao urging him to reinstate the then disgraced Deng Xiaoping. He was arrested in the middle of the night and spent the next month in jail.

In 1976, with mass popular demonstrations taking place in Tiananmen Square following the death of Zhou Enlai, Wang wrote to premier Hua Guofeng again in an attempt to seek the rehabilitation of Deng. He was branded a "reactionary" and jailed for 17 months. In February 1979, after Deng had returned to power, Wang was allowed to go back to Beijing, where he took a job in a vegetable warehouse. Wang participated in the 1979 Democracy Wall Movement. He was involved in the student-led democracy movement of 1989, when he attempted to advise the students on strategy, and to mediate between them and the government. In December 1998, wrote an open letter to China's leaders, pleading for leniency against Xu Wenli, Wang Youcai and Qin Yongmin, jailed for establishing the China Democracy Party.

Wang was again arrested on 4 June 1992 when he, acting alone, unfurled a banner in Tiananmen Square on the third anniversary of the Tiananmen Square protests of 1989. He was swiftly arrested and locked up in a psychiatric hospital near Beijing, with a concocted diagnosis of "political monomania".

The official record said: "He was diagnosed as suffering from 'paranoia', and his dangerous behaviour was attributed to his state of delusion." He spent almost 13 years in an Ankang centre in nearby Fangshan.

==== Inside Ankang ====
Wang described widespread abuses in the Beijing Ankang, which is under the control of the Public Security Bureau (PSB): Wang said he had to live in cells with psychotically disturbed inmates convicted of murder, and was forced to swallow chlorpromazine, a psychoactive drug three times a day. He reported under-staffing and described a regime of mismanagement and anarchy: there were only two nurses looking after seventy psychotic patients. Inmates died from abuses from staff and inmates—there was use of electric shock as treatment, and witnessed two deaths which resulted: one from a heart attack during electric acupuncture treatment and one person, Huang Youliang, -incarcerated for "persistently submitting petitions" – had been on hunger strike, and died while being force-fed by inmates.

In August 1999, he was discharged under pressure from Human Rights Watch and Amnesty International for a three-month trial period, subject to him having no contact with the media. On 18 November 1999, Wang asked the authorities if he could hold a press conference to discuss his confinement. Wang was forcibly removed from his home by eight public security officers and returned to Ankang psychiatric hospital in Beijing on 23 November 1999.

=== Release and exile ===
16 August 2005, the authorities released him and unexpectedly deported him to Germany.

Following his release, in 2006, Wang was examined for two days by Dr. Raes and Dr. van der Meer, who said in a statement: "He was not suffering from any mental disorder that could justify his admission."

== Personal life ==
With his wife, Wang Junying, and daughter, Wang lives in Germany as a refugee.
