= Ruan Xiaohuan =

Chinese blogger (born 1977)

- 阮晓寰
- Born: 10 June 1977 (age 49); Quanzhou, Fujian, China
- Education: East China University of Science and Technology (dropout)
- Occupations: Blogger, information security specialist, political commentator
- Awards: The BOBs (weblog award) (2013, nominated) PRESS FREEDOM AWARDS (The courage price) (2024, nominated)
- Website: program-think.blogspot.com (Chinese)

Ruan Xiaohuan
- Status: serving sentence
- Criminal charges: Inciting subversion of state power
- Penalty: 7 years in prison; 2 years of deprivation of political rights; confiscation of property of 20,000 Chinese yuan

Details
- Date apprehended: 10 May 2021

Ruan Xiaohuan
- ‘Ruan Xiaohuan’ in Simplified (top) and Traditional (bottom) Chinese characters.
- Simplified Chinese: 阮晓寰
- Traditional Chinese: 阮曉寰
Transcriptions
Standard Mandarin
- Hanyu Pinyin: Ruǎn Xiǎohuán
- Bopomofo: ㄖㄨㄢˇ ㄒㄧㄠˇ ㄏㄨㄢˊ
- Gwoyeu Romatzyh: Ruan Sheau-hwan
- Wade–Giles: Juan^{3} Hsiao^{3}-huan^{2}
- IPA: [ɻuàn ɕjàʊ.xuǎn]

Ruan Xiaohuan (Chinese: 阮晓寰; pinyin: Ruǎn Xiǎohuán; born 10 June 1977) is a Chinese dissident, blogger, and information security specialist. In 2009, Ruan started an anonymous blog named ProgramThink (Chinese: 编程随想; pinyin: Biānchéng Suíxiǎng) on Blogger, covering various topics from network security, methods to bypass the internet blockade in mainland China, to his own political commentaries (including criticism of the Chinese Communist Party) and book recommendations.

Ruan was captured on 10 May 2021 by the Shanghai police for his aforementioned blog. On 10 February 2023, he was convicted of "inciting subversion of state power" by the Shanghai No 2 Intermediate People's Court, and sentenced to seven years of imprisonment with two years of deprivation of political rights and a confiscation of property of 20,000 Chinese yuan. On 13 December 2024, his appeal was dismissed by the Shanghai High People's Court.

== Early life and work ==
Ruan was born on 10 June 1977, in Quanzhou, Fujian, to Zhuang Xiuzhu (Note: This is a Chinese name in which the surname comes first, followed by a given name.) and Ruan Wenling. Ruan Xiaohuan's mother, Zhuang Xiuzhu (Chinese: 莊秀珠 (Note: Zhuang Xiuzhu preferred that her name be written in traditional Chinese. This preference can be observed from her handwritten signature in her letter to the General Office of the Central Committee of the RCCK and the characters her husband used when writing her name in their joint letter to the Shanghai People's Procuratorate.); pinyin: Zhuāng Xiùzhū), is a member of the Revolutionary Committee of the Chinese Kuomintang (RCCK) and worked at the Quanzhou Flour Mill. Ruan's father, Ruan Wenling (Chinese: 阮温陵; pinyin: Ruǎn Wēnlíng), is a Chinese literature Professor at Huaqiao University and a member of the China Democratic League (CDL).

Ruan's maternal grandparents migrated to Taipei in 1949 along with the mainland exodus and the relocation of the central government of the Republic of China to Taiwan, leaving Ruan's mother, Zhuang Xiuzhu, who was only eight months old at the time, under the care of her maternal grandmother in Quanzhou. Ruan's maternal grandmother, Chuang Yen-ching (Chinese: 莊燕卿; Wade–Giles: Chuang¹ Yen⁴-ch'ing¹ (Note: While Zhuang Xiuzhu’s name is romanised with Hanyu Pinyin, the name of Zhuang's mother, Chuang Yen-ching, is romanised with Wade–Giles, to follow the conventions of both sides. In this case, ‘Zhuang’ and ‘Chuang’ are different transliterations of the same Chinese character, ‘莊’.)), later established a company in Taipei and engaged in the indoor and women's accessories business. In 1988, as the cross-strait relations continued to thaw, Ruan's mother, Zhuang Xiuzhu, travelled to Taipei with her husband (Ruan's father) to briefly reunite with her mother (Ruan's maternal grandmother), whom she had not seen for almost 40 years, and to pay tribute to her late father.

Ruan first discovered his passion for information technology in 1990 at the age of 13, when he was in secondary school. He joined a computer enthusiasts group at that time and became fascinated with MS-DOS viruses. To better understand them, he taught himself assembly language and C in his school's computer room.

Ruan went on to study chemical engineering at the East China University of Science and Technology in 1996 but continued to be infatuated with computer science and used most of his time to further his studies in the field, which resulted in his failure to pass exams of his major courses and the College English Test level 4, and led to his later decision to drop out in the fourth year and pursue his career in IT industries. A decision he made much to the dismay of his parents, particularly to his father, who held a professorship. At university, Ruan met his future wife, Bei Zhenying (Chinese: 贝震颖; pinyin: Bèi Zhènyǐng), his then classmate.

At work, Ruan practised in various information security industries, including managing intrusion detection systems and security operations centres and engaging in information security audits. He served as a chief engineer for the information security system used in the 2008 Beijing Olympics.

In 2012, Ruan resigned from his job to be fully committed to open-source software development.

== Blog ‘ProgramThink’ and Project ‘zhao’ ==
=== The blog ===
On 15 January 2009, Ruan created his blog ProgramThink on Blogger. For the first few months, the blog only focused on computer technology and software development. Later, a massive wave of internet censorship was enforced in mainland China around the 20th anniversary of the 1989 Tiananmen Square protests and massacre, which led Ruan to turn his blog to focus on sharing methods to bypass the block.

Several social incidents in 2010 and 2011, such as the death of Qian Yunhui and the 2011 Chinese pro-democracy protests, inspired Ruan to write more about subjects beyond just technology. Ruan gradually expanded the content of his blog from purely technical articles to a wide range of topics, including more overt political commentaries, historical reviews, book recommendations, etc. These aspects later formed the main contents of his blog.

In an email interview conducted by Deutsche Welle after his blog was nominated for the 2013 Deutsche Welle International Best of Blogs (BOBs) Awards, Ruan told Deutsche Welle that nonviolent revolution was the only way to solve China's problems and could only be achieved when the general public possessed a higher level of political literacy and psychological resilience. He said that advancing the public's political literacy and psychological resilience, so that people would be more willing to engage in political affairs and less susceptible to brainwashing, was his motivation for writing the blog.

Due to the worsening situation in mainland China, Ruan made a commitment to publish new content or leave a message at least once every 14 days to prove he was safe. He kept the promise even in November 2017 when he had an allergic asthma attack requiring treatment with corticosteroid injections, resulting in severe erythroderma and causing him to be confined to bed. Ruan kept writing his blog up to one day prior to his apprehension, which amounted to 712 posts in total.

In December 2021, six months after posts stopped appearing, the blog was named "Person of the Year" by China Digital Times.

=== The project ===
In February 2016, Ruan started Project Zhao (also known as the Princeling Network Map) on GitHub, collecting information on over 700 high-level Chinese officials (the so-called Princelings) that was publicly reported by credible media and compiling them into a 'network' to demonstrate that these high-level officials are inter-connected and corrupt.

On 8 June 2016, GitHub received a letter from the Cyber Security Association of China, claiming Project Zhao "vilifies our President Xi" and requesting that the project to be removed "at the earliest time possible". GitHub, however, chose to make this letter public and not to remove the project. It was the first notice and take down request GitHub had ever received from Beijing.

== Arrest and the first-instance trial ==
=== Disappearance ===
To the outside world, it seemed that Ruan had disappeared around late May 2021, as he had remained silent for more than 14 days; he had previously promised to post at least once every 14 days to prove he was safe. Ruan's disappearance raised concerns about his well-being and whereabouts on the internet.

Only in late March 2023, when Ruan's wife chose to speak out for help on the internet, did the public become aware of Ruan's arrest and the subsequent process of secret trial and adjudication.

=== Arrest and secret trial ===
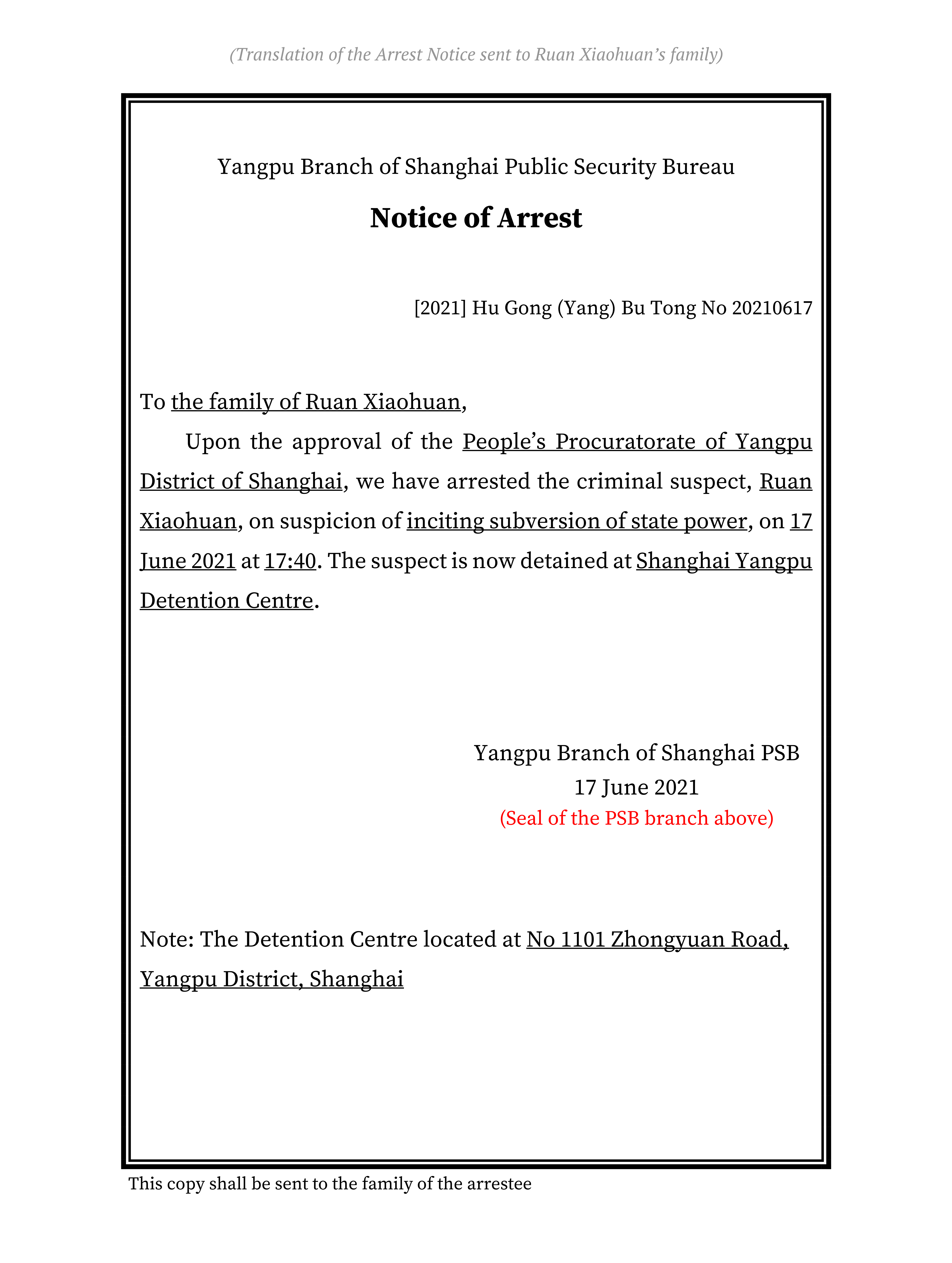
Notice of Arrest received by the family of Ruan Xiaohuan (translated). (Note: In mainland China's criminal procedure, there often comes an interval of usually no longer than 37 days between one being captured and detained (which is called the ‘criminal detention’) and the formal arrest, this is stipulated under Article 91 of the Criminal Procedure Law of mainland China.)

It was later revealed that the police raided Ruan's residence in Shanghai and took him away by force on 10 May 2021 at around noon. Ruan's spectacles were shattered during these events. The search at Ruan's residence continued to the small hours the next day. Ruan's wife, Bei Zhenying, was also questioned by the police, but it became clear she had not been aware of the blog.

Ruan was then criminally detained on 11 May 2021 and formally arrested on 17 June 2021 on suspicion of "inciting subversion of state power".

According to Ruan's wife's account, the police did not present a search warrant while conducting the search on 10 May 2021, only to have produced one two days after. (Note: According to Paragraph 2 of Article 138 of the Criminal Procedure Law of mainland China, the police may conduct a search without a warrant in case of emergency.) The Notice of Detention was also issued to the family two weeks later, far exceeding the time limit stipulated by the mainland China's Criminal Procedure Law. (Note: According to Paragraph 2 of Article 85 of the Criminal Procedure Law of mainland China, it is lawful not to issue a ‘Notice of Detention’ to the family of a detainee if the case involved is regarded as ‘state security–endangering’ and the investigation authority reckons the notification would hinder the investigation.)

Ruan's case was tried secretly for, according to the judgement, "the case involves state secrets". But on 10 February 2023, the Shanghai No 2 Intermediate People's Court conducted a short proceeding and proclaimed the judgement in court, with Ruan's wife attending in the audience, the first time the two met since Ruan was taken away. Ruan was sentenced to seven years of imprisonment with two years of deprivation of political rights and a confiscation of property of 20,000 Chinese yuan.

In the judgement, Ruan was convicted of "inciting subversion of state power" for "composing over 100 seditious essays of rumours and libel, attacked and smeared the current political system of our country, incited subversion of the state power, and attempted to overthrow the socialist system". The court also found him to have caused a "pernicious" impact on society for the long time span of his blog and the large number of his posts and therefore held that his offence was "grave", which constituted the basis for sentencing.

Ruan refused to accept the first-instance ruling and had appealed to the Shanghai High People's Court on the day the judgement was issued.

== Controversies following the appeal ==
After the appeal was registered, the Chinese authorities blocked Ruan's family's attempt to freely appoint defence counsel according to their will by filling Ruan's quota for defenders (maximum of two (Note: This is stipulated under Article 33 of the Criminal Procedure Law of mainland China.)) with state-appointed lawyers. Ruan's family tried to challenge this situation through lawful routes but failed. It is to Ruan's family's understanding that the presiding judge of the first-instance trial was involved in this. Therefore, on 7 April 2023, Ruan's parents wrote a letter to the Shanghai People's Procuratorate, questioning the result of the first-instance judgement, appealing to the Procuratorate against the propriety and legitimacy of the approaches of the first-instance judge in obstructing Ruan's family to appoint defence counsel freely. Ruan's mother, Zhuang Xiuzhu, wrote a separate letter on 5 May 2023 to the General Office of the Central Committee of the RCCK to seek help.

Ruan's wife, Bei Zhenying, attempted to travel to Beijing in early April 2023 to meet with Mo Shaoping and Shang Baojun, the lawyers she wished to appoint, only to be intercepted by the Beijing police at the hotel and barricaded in her room, where she was asked to write down her claims and was promised by the police that they would forward her claims through their "channel". She was then escorted back to her home in Shanghai by staff members of the Shanghai Petitions Office. Furthermore, the two lawyers' communication with the outside world was also interfered with, with Shang Baojun claiming not to be able to send messages even using an instant messaging software with encryption.

Bei, however, after being escorted back to Shanghai, bought a megaphone in late March and took weekly tours to the periphery of the Shanghai Yangpu Detention Centre, where Ruan is detained, using it to pass messages to him, telling him that the world has known his identity and his case is gaining international attention.

On 31 May 2023, Ruan's wife, Bei Zhenying, was said to have lost all contact with the outside world and was understood to have been taken away by the local police, according to Radio Free Asia journalist Su Yutong. She is believed to have been released the next day but with her mobile phone confiscated. Before this happened, she had been appealing for awareness of Ruan's case vociferously on the internet via her Twitter account and through interviews with the media. On 6 June 2023, her Twitter account was deleted. A lawyer for Bei told the New York Times that she "was safe but could not comment further", which the Times called "a sign that the authorities had most likely warned her into silence".

It was revealed in late May 2023 that the second-instance trial was postponed, with no date scheduled. Ruan's wife, Bei, was allowed to visit him in person for the first time on 22 August 2025, more than four years after the arrest.

== Final judgement ==
Ruan’s appeal was dismissed by the Shanghai High People’s Court on 13 December 2024 with a short hearing that only lasted seven minutes. The first-instance judgement is upheld. In accordance with the judicial system of mainland China and pursuant to Article 244 of its Criminal Procedure Law, the second-instance judgement is final.

== Reactions ==
On 23 March 2023, PEN America and PEN International issued a joint statement, condemned the sentence, and called for an immediate release of Ruan.

On 30 March 2023, Iris Hsu, the China Representative of the Committee to Protect Journalists, called for an immediate and unconditional release of Ruan on CPJ's official Twitter account.

On 3 April 2023, Cédric Alviani, the East Asia Bureau Director of Reporters Without Borders (RSF), called on the international community to put pressure on the Chinese authorities to release Ruan and other detained journalists and press freedom defenders.

On 4 April 2023, the Congressional-Executive Commission on China (CECC) compiled Ruan's profile into its political prisoner database and released it on its official website. The Commission later called for Ruan's unconditional release on its official Twitter account on 11 April.

On 7 June 2023, PEN America reported the new developments of Bei Zhenying on Twitter, expressed their concerns and continued to call for Ruan's immediate and unconditional release.

On 9 June 2023, the Electronic Frontier Foundation published an essay on its website, giving an account of the case and Ruan's past and calling for a ‘must release’ of Ruan.

== See also ==
- Inciting subversion of state power, Human rights in China, and List of Chinese dissidents
- Censorship in China, Internet censorship in China and Internet censorship circumvention
- Great Firewall and Great Cannon
