= Morohoshi =

Morohoshi, or Moroboshi (written: 諸星) is a Japanese surname. Notable people with the surname include:

- Daijiro Morohoshi (諸星 大二郎, born 1949), Japanese manga artist
- Sayaka Morohoshi (諸星 清佳, born 1965), Japanese journalist
- Sumire Morohoshi (諸星 すみれ, born 1999), Japanese voice actress
