= Liu Pin-yen =

Liu Pin-yen may refer to:

- Liu Binyan (1925–2005), Chinese writer, journalist and dissident
- Esther Liu (born 1988), Taiwanese actress, singer and show host
