= Sidik =

Sidik is a name. People with the name include:

- Irvan Sidik
- Qelbinur Sidik
- Joko Sidik
- Mohamed Sidik
- Mohammad Sidik
- Abida Sidik Mia
- Sidik Fofana
- Sidik Djojosukarto
- Sidik Saimima
- Sidik Mia
- Sîdîk Ibrahim H. Mîrzî

== See also ==
- Haji Muhammad Sidik Airport
