= Open Letter to the 16th National Congress of the Chinese Communist Party =

2002 petition to the ruling party of China for political liberalisation

The Open Letter to the 16th National Congress of the Chinese Communist Party was a petition from political activists in the People's Republic of China which urged the Chinese Communist Party to introduce political reforms.

There were 192 signatories to the letter of a letter in November 2002, which was posted on the Internet calling on the 16th National Congress of the Chinese Communist Party to introduce political reforms.

== 6 Demands ==
- political rehabilitation of the 1989 pro-democracy movement
- the right of political exiles to return from abroad
- release Zhao Ziyang from house arrest and restore his political rights
- the release of jailed political prisoners
- ratification of the International Covenant on Political and Civil Rights
- the holding of free elections

The Chinese authorities reacted to its publication with an immediate clampdown and arrest of the more prominent political activists who had signed the letter.

The following notable co-signatories, He Depu, Jiang Lijun, Zhao Changqing, Ouyang Yi, Sang Jiancheng, Han Lifa, and Dai Xuezhong, have been tried for "subversion".

== See also ==
- Golden Shield Project
- He Depu
- Jiang Lijun
