= Lü Gengsong =

Chinese writer and civil rights activist

Lü Gengsong (Chinese: 呂耿松; also written as Lu Gengsong; born on January 7, 1956, in Hangzhou) is a Chinese writer and civil rights activist. He is mostly recognized as the author of the book A History of Chinese Communist Party Corrupt Officials, which appeared in Hong Kong in 2000. He was imprisoned in 2008 and 2016.

== Career ==
Lü graduated with a history degree from Zhejiang University. He subsequently taught at a police college until 1993, when he was expelled because of his pro-democracy activities. He published several books, the best known one being "A History of Chinese Communist Party Corrupt Officials," published in Hong Kong in 2000.

== Arrests ==
Lü was taken into custody in August 2007, on charges of "incitement to subvert state power" and "illegally possessing state secrets". He was formally arrested in September. On 5 February 2008, the Intermediate People's Court in Hangzhou announced the verdict over Lü to four years in jail; he had pleaded not guilty the previous month. The "inciting subversion of state power" is generally known to be a very vague charge frequently used to silence people who criticize the Communist Party. Lü's wife, Wang Xue'e told AFP from her home in Hangzhou that "the charges are groundless" and that the "provincial and city governments just want to make him shut up". According to Human Rights in China, police warned Wang against petitioning in Beijing for her detained husband, threatening her with dismissal from her job if she did. Lü was released in August 2011. When Wang was arrested in March 2013 after traveling to Beijing to petition the National People's Congress regarding forced evictions, Lü was visited by police and pressured to make her leave Beijing, which he refused.

In July 2013, the daughter of Lü was disallowed to fly from Hangzhou Xiaoshan Airport to Hong Kong, which Lü in an interview with Radio Free Asia ascribed to his political activities.

On August 13, 2014, Lü was arrested for "subversion of state power", according to a statement from his lawyer, who suspected that the arrest was in relation to the ties of Lü with the banned China Democracy Party. He had been detained, and his house searched and his computers confiscated, in November 2013 on similar charges. During the trial of Lü in September 2015, prosecutors cited his articles published overseas, as well as a meeting with other activists and a condolence event in which he took part. On June 17, 2016, Lü was sentenced to eleven years in jail; he had pleaded not guilty.

In May 2021, it was reported that family members of Lü were informed by Zhejiang prison authorities that prisoners who had not pleaded guilty would be subject to stricter controls, which applied to Lü. It was also reported that he was in poor physical and mental health, and had lost most of his teeth.

== See also ==
- List of Chinese pro-democracy activists
