= Ti-Anna Wang =

Chinese dissident (born 1989)

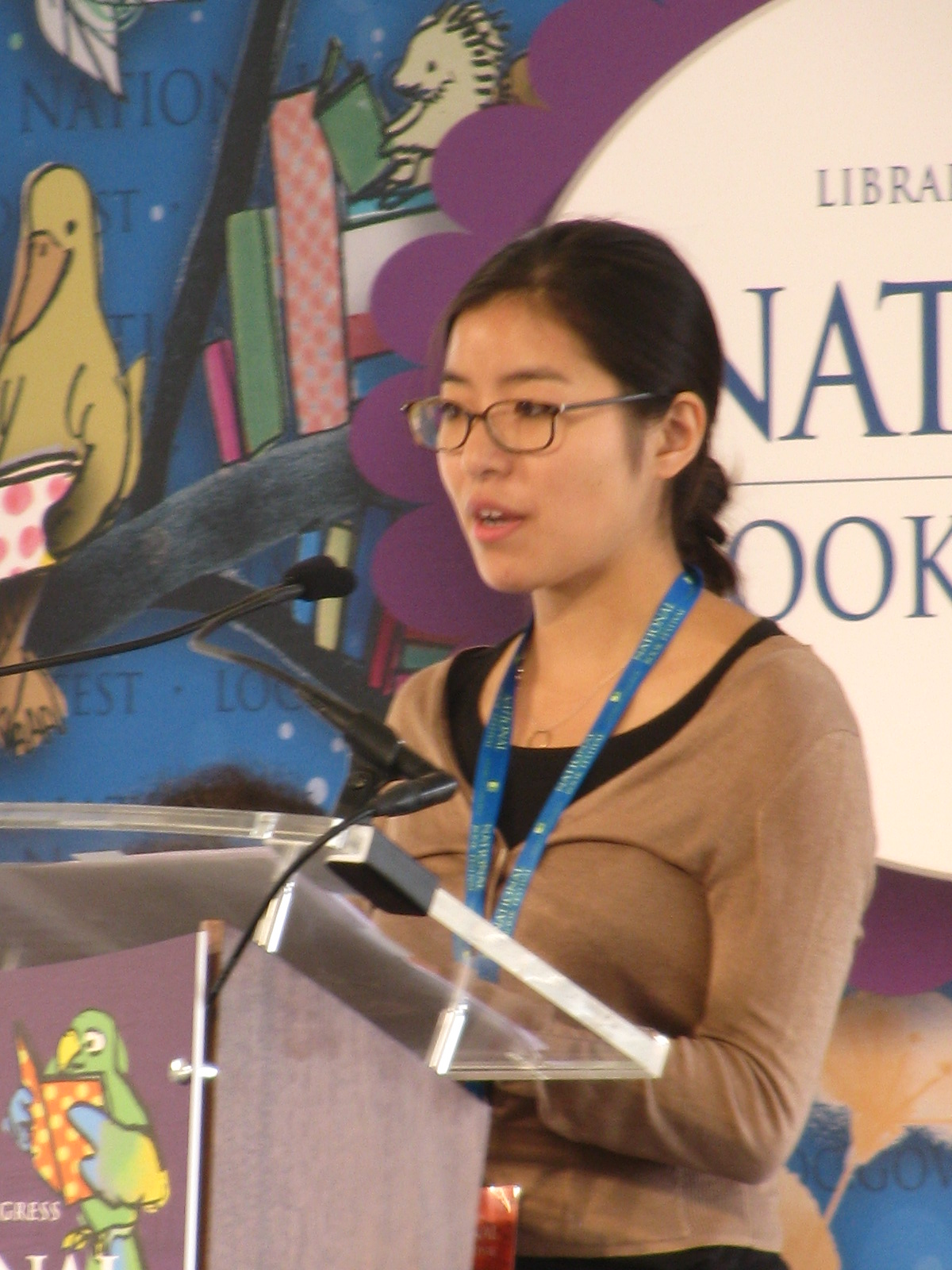
- Born: 1989 (age 36–37)
- Known for: Human rights activist

Ti-Anna Wang (born 1989) is a Chinese-Canadian-American dissident and daughter of Wang Bingzhang. Her father is currently imprisoned in China for political agitation.

== Life ==
She grew up in Montreal. In 2008, she lobbied for the release of her father.

Fred Hiatt wrote a fictional account of her efforts to free her father. On January 9, 2019, she was denied entry to China while trying to visit her father. Despite possessing a valid visa she was deported to Jeju Island, South Korea. On January 16 she took a return flight from Seoul to Toronto that connected through Beijing. When the plane landed in Beijing, she was detained by police and sent back to South Korea.
