= Wang Shouxin =

Chinese politician

Wang Shouxin (Chinese: 王守信; died February 8, 1980) was a low-level cadre of the Chinese Communist Party who was convicted in the biggest corruption scandal of the People's Republic of China prior to 1979. She was executed in February 1980.

Working in Heilongjiang province, she embezzled at least 536,000 yuan of state funds. Her case was investigated by writer Liu Binyan and published in an exposé article and reportage titled People or Monsters (人妖之间), published in People's Literature in September 1979.

A series of photos of the execution of Wang Shouxin accompany an account of the case in The Chinese Century: A Photographic History of the Last Hundred Years.
