= Fang Lizhi =

Political dissident and astrophysicist

- 方励之
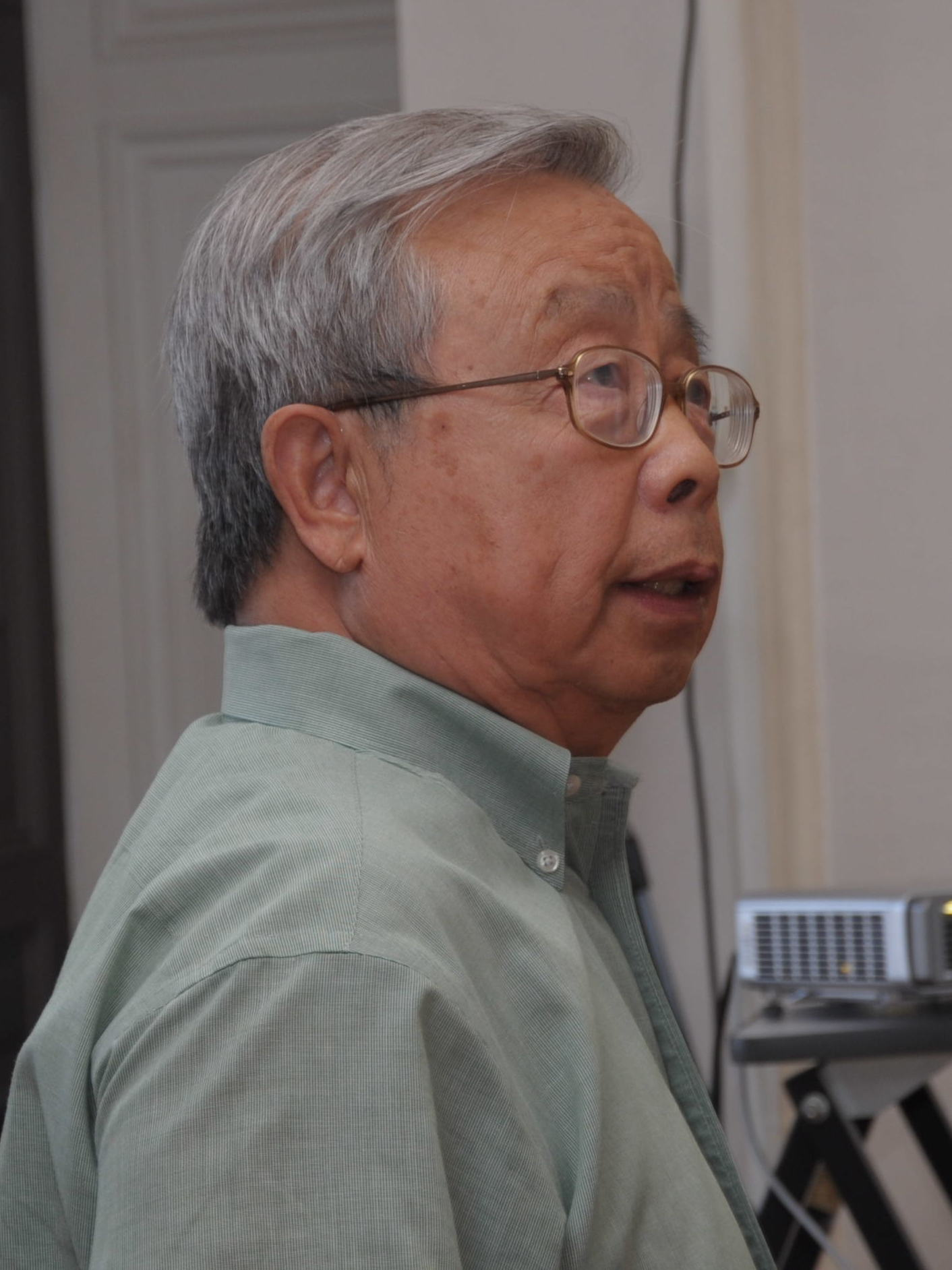
- Fang Lizhi in 2010
- Born: February 12, 1936; Beijing, China
- Died: April 6, 2012 (aged 76); Tucson, Arizona, U.S.
- Education: Beijing No.4 High School; Peking University
- Occupation: Astrophysicist
- Known for: 1986 Student Demonstrations
- Spouse: Li Shuxian (m. 1961)

Chinese name
- Traditional Chinese: 方勵之
- Simplified Chinese: 方励之
Transcriptions
Standard Mandarin
- Hanyu Pinyin: Fāng Lìzhī
- IPA: [fáŋ lîʈʂí]

Fang Lizhi (Chinese: 方励之; pinyin: Fāng Lìzhī; February 12, 1936 – April 6, 2012) was a Chinese astrophysicist, vice-president of the University of Science and Technology of China, and activist whose liberal ideas inspired the pro-democracy student movement of 1986–87 and, finally, the Tiananmen Square protests of 1989. Fang was considered as one of the leaders of the New Enlightenment in the 1980s. Because of his activism, he was expelled from the Chinese Communist Party in January 1987. For his work, Fang was a recipient of the Robert F Kennedy Human Rights Award in 1989, given each year. He was elected an academician of the Chinese Academy of Sciences in 1980, but his position was revoked after 1989.

== Life and career in China ==
Fang was born on 12 February 1936 in Beijing. His father worked on the railway. In 1948, a year before the People's Liberation Army took over the city, as a student of the Beijing No. 4 High School, he joined an underground youth organization that was associated with the Chinese Communist Party (CCP). One of his extracurricular activities was assembling radio receivers from used parts.

In 1952, he enrolled in the Physics Department at Peking University, where he met his future wife, Li Shuxian (李淑娴). Both Fang and Li were among the top students in their class. After graduating, he joined the CCP, started working at the Institute of Modern Physics and became involved in China's secret atomic bomb program, while Li stayed at Peking University as a junior faculty member.

In 1957, during the Hundred Flowers Campaign, people were strongly encouraged by the CCP to openly express their opinions and criticisms. As party members, Li, Fang and another person in the physics department planned to write a letter to the party to offer their suggestions on education. This letter was still unfinished by the time the Hundred Flowers Campaign abruptly came to an end and the Anti-Rightist Campaign started. The opinions and criticisms solicited during the earlier campaign were then interpreted as "attacks on the party", and those who had expressed such opinions were labelled "rightist" and persecuted. Although no one knew about the unfinished letter, out of loyalty to the party, Fang, Li and their friend confessed to writing it; Li also confessed her doubts about the party. Li was expelled from the CCP, and sentenced to hard labour in Zhaitang, a town near Beijing. Fang was not immediately expelled from the party, because he played a lesser role in writing the letter, and also because he had left Peking University, where the punishment was particularly severe. However, he was removed from the nuclear program and sent to do hard labour in Zanhuang, Hebei province from December 1957 to August 1958. Out of political pressure, Li and Fang put their relationship on hold until early 1959, when Fang was also expelled from the CCP. In August 1958, Fang was reassigned to the faculty of the University of Science and Technology of China (USTC), which was located in Beijing at the time. In 1961 he married Li, who remained a faculty member of Peking University. In spite of his experience in the anti-Rightist campaign, Fang published an article in the Guangming Daily, encouraging the independent thinking of students.

Fang published his first research paper on nuclear physics in Acta Physica Sinica 17, p. 57 (1961) under the pseudonym Wang Yunran, since as a rightist he was not entitled to publish research papers. Later, on the recommendation of Qian Linzhao, he became an associated member of a research group led by Li Yinyuan at the Institute of Physics, Chinese Academy of Sciences. Since Li's group was at a different institute, this arrangement took advantage of a loophole in management rules, allowing him to publish papers under his own name. In the late 1950s and early 1960s, Fang conducted research in particle physics, solid state physics and laser physics. By 1965, he had published 13 research papers and was considered one of the most productive physics researchers in China. That year, as part of the effort of cleansing Beijing of "undesirable elements", Fang was to be removed from the faculty of USTC and sent to work in an electronics factory in Liaoning province. Learning about this, vice president Yan Jici intervened on Fang's behalf; he pleaded the case to the party secretary of USTC at the time, Liu Da, who cancelled the cleansing order for Fang and other faculty members of USTC.

Academic activities were interrupted when the Cultural Revolution broke out in 1966. In 1969, along with other universities and research institutes, USTC was ordered to be evacuated out of Beijing, ostensibly in anticipation of an impending invasion by the Soviet Union. USTC was moved to Hefei, the capital of Anhui Province, where it remains to this day. Upon arriving in Hefei in 1969, Fang, along with other "problematic members" of the faculty, were sent to do hard labour for "re-education by the worker class" in a coal mine. Fang secretly brought with him one physics book, the "Classical Theory of Fields" by Lev Landau and learned the theory of general relativity by reading this book in the evening. Later, in 1971, along with a number of other faculty members, he was assigned to do labour work in a brick factory, which produced the bricks for constructing the new USTC campus buildings.

== Research in astrophysics and cosmology ==
In 1972, the worst chaos of the Cultural Revolution was over and scientific research resumed. Fang found an opportunity to read some recent astrophysics papers in western journals, and soon wrote his first paper on cosmology, "A Cosmological Solution in Scalar-tensor Theory with Mass and Blackbody Radiation", which was published on the journal Wu Li (Physics), Vol. 1, 163 (1972). This was the first modern cosmological research paper in mainland China. Fang assembled a group of young faculty members of USTC around him to conduct astrophysics research.

At the time, conducting research on relativity theory and cosmology in China was very risky politically, because these theories were considered to be "idealistic" theories in contradiction with dialectical materialism, a central component of the Communist Party's ideology. According to the dialectical materialism philosophy, both time and space must be infinite, while the Big Bang theory allows the possibility of the finiteness of space and time. During the Cultural Revolution, campaigns were waged against Albert Einstein and the Theory of Relativity in Beijing and Shanghai. Once Fang published his theory, some of the critics of the Theory of Relativity, especially a group based in Shanghai, prepared to attack Fang politically. However, by this time the "leftist" line was declining in the Chinese academia. Professor Dai Wensai, the most well-known Chinese astronomer at the time and chair of the Astronomy Department of Nanjing University, also supported Fang. Many of the members of the "Theory of Relativity Criticism Group" changed to study the theory and conduct research in it. Subsequently, Fang was regarded as the father of cosmological research in China.

Fang published a large number of papers on astrophysics and cosmology. In the late 1970s, he and his group used the luminosity of selected radio quasars to measure the Hubble diagram, and with data available at the time, suggested that the universe may be closed (Fang et al., Acta Astronomica Sinica 17, 134 (1977)). This work was noticed by researchers outside China; a Nature article noted that it obtained similar results to, but appeared earlier than, the paper by Davidsen et al., Nature 269, 203 (1977). Fang also carried out research on topics including neutron stars, black holes, inflation and quantum cosmology. He soon gained international recognition, and as China began to open up in the late 1970s, he was invited to international conferences outside the country. In 1985, together with H. Sato of Kyoto University, Japan, Fang won the first prize of the Gravity Research Foundation essay competition by proposing that the periodic distribution of quasars observed can be explained if the Universe is multiply-connected, i.e. has a non-trivial topology.

He was elected as the youngest member of the Chinese Academy of Sciences in 1980. His membership was, however, revoked after the Tiananmen Square protest of 1989. He helped promote international academic exchange in China. Together with Remo Ruffini, he organized the first major international scientific conference in China: the 3rd Marcel Grossmann meeting in 1982. During this meeting, Tsvi Piran and T.G. Horowitz became the first two Israeli scientists to enter the People's Republic of China; at the time, there were no diplomatic relations between China and Israel. He invited Stephen Hawking to visit China in 1985, and organized the International Astronomical Union conference IAU-124 on "Observational Cosmology" in Beijing in 1986.

Fang also trained many younger colleagues and students in the field of astrophysics and cosmology; he was considered an excellent teacher. Fang and Li coauthored "Introduction to Mechanics", an introductory book on Newtonian mechanics and special theory of relativity. This book has been considered a classic by many teachers and students, although few students are aware of it in recent years. Fang was also the first scientist in China to write popular accounts of contemporary astrophysical developments, such as cosmology and black holes. Fang's book, "Creation of the Universe" (Yuzhou de chuangsheng in Chinese) which was published in 1987, introduced basic cosmological ideas, and influenced a large number of physics and astronomy students growing up in the 1980s in China.

== Political activism ==
During the Anti-Rightist Campaign, Fang was expelled from the Chinese Communist Party for his "reactionary activities", viz. publishing an article critical of the government's policies on science education.

He was rehabilitated after the reform of China in late 1970s, and resumed his party membership. During this time, he held many academic positions, including the director of the astrophysics research group of USTC, and director of the science history research group, chief editor of the USTC academic journal, chair of the Chinese society of gravity and relativistic astrophysics. In 1984, Fang was appointed as the vice president of the USTC under president Guan Weiyan. Fang was very active in this role; for example he helped to set up the telex service for USTC. He was very popular among the students. Fang also began to write essays for publication in popular magazines, and gave lectures on a variety of topics in universities, though usually not in USTC. Many such essays and lectures expressed his liberal view on politics, reflections on history, and criticisms on CCP dogma. He also emphasized social responsibility of intellectuals. In late 1986, Fang, together with Xu Liangying and Liu Binyan, wrote letters to a number of well-known "Rightists" from the 1957 Anti-Rightist campaign, suggesting a meeting in memory of that event.

In December 1986, college students demonstrated in over a dozen Chinese cities in demanding greater economic and political freedoms. Fang was against the student demonstration, believing it would be suppressed by the CCP; he tried to persuade the USTC students not to go off-campus. After two straight weeks of student demonstrations, believing that the student movement was a result of "bourgeois liberalization", Deng Xiaoping named three Communist Party members to be expelled: Fang, Liu Binyan and Wang Ruowang. Deng directed then-CCP General Secretary Hu Yaobang to expel them from the Party, but Hu refused. Because of his refusal, Hu Yaobang was dismissed from his position as General Secretary in January 1987, effectively ending his period of influence within the Chinese government.

Fang was again expelled from Chinese Communist Party in January 1987, and removed from his position as the vice president of the university. He was moved to Beijing as a research scientist at the Beijing Astronomical Observatory, now a part of the National Astronomical Observatory of China, and reunited with his wife, Li Shuxian, a professor at Peking University. He gained fame and notoriety after his essays were collected by the Chinese Communist Party and distributed to many of its regional offices, with the directive to its members to criticize the essays.

== 1989 democracy movement and exile ==
In February 1989, Fang mobilized a number of well known intellectuals to write an open letter to Deng Xiaoping, requesting amnesty for the human right activist Wei Jingsheng who was then in prison. His wife, Li, was elected to become the people's representative of the Haidian District where Peking University is located. Fang and his wife had exchanged ideas about Chinese politics with some students of Peking University, including Wang Dan and Liu Gang. Some of those students became student leaders during the Tiananmen Square protests of 1989, though Fang and Li did not actively participate in the protest itself.

During U.S. President George H. W. Bush's February 1989 visit to China, the U.S. embassy invited Fang to a banquet that Bush was hosting at the Sheraton Great Wall Hotel in honor of Deng Xiaoping. Deng had a negative view of Fang. Public Security stopped Fang on his way to the banquet and prevented him from attending.

On June 5, 1989, the day after the government cracked down on the Tiananmen Square protests, Fang and Li sought asylum at the U.S. embassy in Beijing, accompanied by U.S. academic Perry Link. Fang and Li were initially turned away, but Jeffrey A. Bader, then acting director of the Office of Chinese and Mongolian Affairs at the State Department, used very strong language to order the embassy to reverse their decision. That night, Fang and his family were smuggled into the embassy in the back of a van. The Chinese government put Fang and Li at the top of the "wanted" list of the people involved in the protest. During his time in the U.S. embassy, Fang wrote an essay titled The Chinese Amnesia, criticizing the Chinese Communist Party's repression of human rights and the outside world's turning a blind eye to it. Fang's continued presence in the US Embassy following the protests became, according to U.S. Ambassador James Lilley, "a living symbol of our [US] conflict with China over human rights."

Fang and his wife remained in the US Embassy until June 25, 1990, when they were allowed by Chinese authorities to leave the embassy and board a U.S. Air Force C-135 transport plane to Britain. This resolution partly came about after confidential negotiations between Henry Kissinger, acting on behalf of US President George H. W. Bush, and Deng. Other factors were a false confession by Fang, an attempted intervention by US National Security Adviser Brent Scowcroft, and an offer from the Japanese government to resume loans to the PRC in return for the resolution of "the Fang Lizhi problem."

In 1989, he was a recipient of the Robert F. Kennedy Human Rights Award. In 1991, he gave a conference on the issue of Tibet in New York, one of the first open dialogues between Chinese and Tibetans. He also was an advisor for the International Campaign for Tibet.

== Later life in the US ==
After some time at Cambridge University and Princeton, Fang later moved to Tucson, Arizona, where he worked as Professor of Physics at the University of Arizona. In campus speeches, Fang spoke on topics such as human rights and democracy as matters of social responsibility. He also served as a board member and co-chair of the New York-based organization Human Rights in China.

Fang continued to do research in astrophysics and cosmology. He published research papers even during his stay in the US Embassy in Beijing. His later research includes the study of non-Gaussianity in the cosmic microwave background anisotropy, Lyman alpha forest, application of wavelets in cosmology, turbulence in intergalactic medium, and the 21cm radiation during the Reionization. He continued to train students and younger scientists who visited him from China and was very active in research to the end of his life, publishing multiple research papers each year.

== Death ==
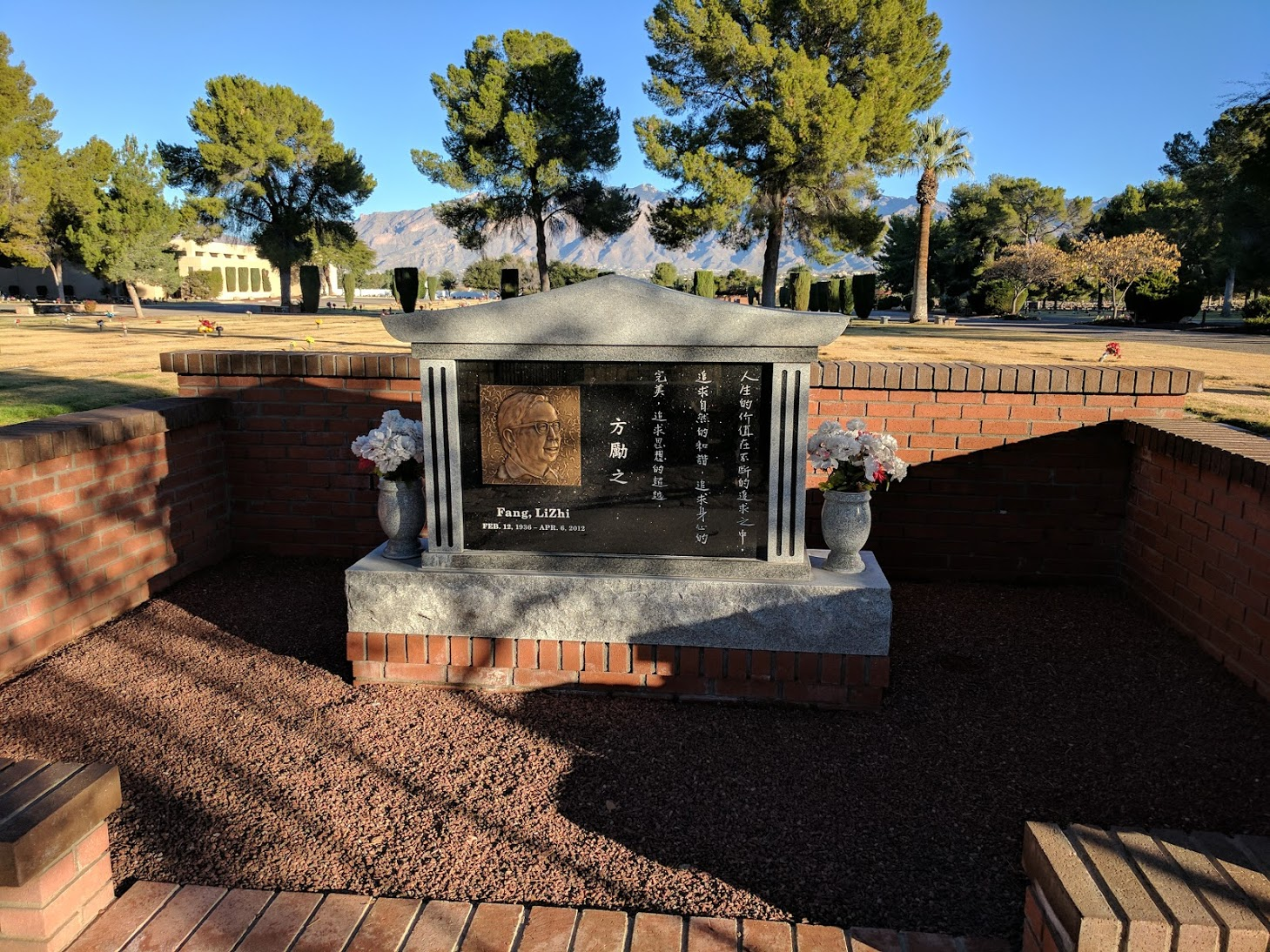
The tombstone of Fang Lizhi, located at East Lawn Palms Mortuary & Cemetery, Tucson, Arizona. Photographed in Jan 2017

He died in his home in Tucson on April 6, 2012, aged 76, from undisclosed causes. He was buried at East Lawn Palms Mortuary & Cemetery on April 14.

== See also ==
- List of Chinese dissidents
- List of Chinese pro-democracy activists
- Richard Baum
