= People or Monsters =

People or Monsters (Chinese: 人妖之间) is a work of reportage by the Chinese writer Liu Binyan about a corrupt official in the northeastern Chinese province of Heilongjiang named Wang Shouxin. People or Monsters created a sensation when it was published in 1979, and became a central element in the effort in China to reflect on and understand the course of Chinese social development, particularly over the course of the Cultural Revolution.

== History ==
People or Monsters was published in People's Literature in September, 1979. It dealt with corruption during the period extending from the mid-1960s until the investigation and prosecution of Wang Shouxin beginning in late 1978.

== Subject matter and themes ==
A major theme of People or Monsters is the root origins that lie beneath the corruption described. Liu devotes a section to detailing "The Interchange System," and calls it the "root of the matter." In his memoir, he said that the story describes a local "planned economy" that was "in practice, nothing but a continuous flow of public resources into the private pockets of the power-holders" and a "network of relationships, that reciprocal exchange of power and cash."

Liu also explores the nature of party affiliation in People or Monsters. Liu was deeply troubled by the fact that all the guilty people were members of the reigning Chinese Communist Party. Moreover, he raised the touchy subject of whether a "party" of one's personal cronies is actually the operative institution in China. In his memoir, he puts it bluntly: "various groups had been formed for self-protection or promotion of interests. And with the Cultural Revolution, new groups had been formed."

Another important theme in People or Monsters is the mood of the nation. He describes "Weakening of the Backbone" as the affliction of the times, and in one of his memoirs he wrote of the spiritual malaise he saw Chinese society suffering from.

The treatment of characters in People or Monsters has the effect of reminding readers of people they know. "What was powerful about Liu's piece was it universality: everyone in China knew people like Wang Shouxin, and it made everyone think of all those who had not been brought to justice."

A major concern of the author was who, in fact, will be the lone person to speak out when it is needed (particularly in the face of harsh intimidation). He ironically refers to the villain as "A Heroine for Our Time," but in really hails "Nobodies who Became Somebodies," focusing on two stubborn whistleblowers.

Overall, the style of People or Monsters relies heavily on irony, stressing the many cases in which "the world is turned upside down" and "good people are at the bottom and bad people are on top." This is related to the theme of the absence of direct communication, and the need for indirect communication.

== Historical significance ==
People or Monsters was widely read in China, and was broadly re-distributed following initial publication. It was the first in a series of works describing corruption and social problems, and was noteworthy for its use of fact-based reporting (reportage) in place of pure fiction.

== Comparative perspective ==
People or Monsters bears comparison with other works of modern literature dealing with the problems of corruption and the political culture of corruption.

All the King's Men by Robert Penn Warren is a novel about the political career of Huey P. Long and the political culture in Louisiana.

The Chinese novel The Scholars gives a perspective on the political culture of corruption in pre-modern China.

More generally, People or Monsters and the work of Liu Binyan can be compared to the work of other muckraking journalists.

== English translations ==
Lee Yee, ed. The New Realism: Writings from China after the Cultural Revolution, New York: Hippocrene, 1983. Translated as "Between Human and Demon" by Lu Yunzhong and Gu Tingfu.)

Liu Binyan, People or Monsters and other stories and reportage from China after Mao, translated by Perry Link. ISBN 0-253-20313-9
