= Sayaka Morohoshi =

Japanese journalist

- Born: February 24, 1965 (age 61); Japan Kushiro city in Hokkaido prefecture
- Education: Tokyo University of Foreign -Studies; Wuhan University; Peking University
- Occupations: a staff writer of the Hokkaido -Shimbun Press a lecturer of Takaoka National College a freelance journalist

Sayaka Morohoshi (諸星清佳, Morohoshi Sayaka; born 24 February 1965) is a Japanese journalist. He is known for his books and articles on modern China.

== Early life ==
Morohoshi was born in Kushiro city and grew up in Sapporo. He studied modern Chinese literature at Tokyo University of Foreign Studies. His graduation thesis is "Liu Binyan and freedom of speech in China". He studied at Wuhan University (from September 1987 to February 1989) and Peking University (from Sept.1991 to Jul.1992) to study modern Chinese literature. As a university student, he wrote a feature story about San'ya (a slum in Tokyo) in the newspaper of the Tokyo University of Foreign Studies.

== Career ==
He worked at the Hokkaido Shimbun Press, and completed a master's course at Tokyo University of Foreign Studies in historical and cultural studies of modern China.

He was a lecturer of Takaoka National College (later the faculty of art and design in University of Toyama) from Nov.1998 to Jan.2001.

== Views ==
He appreciates Reform and Opening Up period and regards Maoism, especially the Cultural Revolution, as fascism. He criticised Japanese journalist Katsuichi Honda, whom he charged with concealing Honda's standpoint as a Maoist even though Honda admired the Cultural Revolution. Although many China watchers in Japan expected the Chinese economy (or China itself) to collapse around 2007, he rejected such claims. He wanted to report on the persecution of Uyghurs in Xinjiang, but Katsuichi Honda――the chief editor of Weekly Friday―refused to carry the article.

== Works ==
- 『沈黙の国の記者――劉賓雁と中国共産党』A Journalist in the Silent Country: Liu Binyan and the Chinese Communist Party (1992.12)
- 『ルポ中国』China Now (1996.7)
- 『中国革命の夢が潰えたとき――毛沢東に裏切られた人々』Disillusion to the Communist Revolution of China:People Betrayed by Mao Zedong (2000.1)
- 『チベットの現在』Tibet Now (2014.1)

== Translation ==
- 『劉賓雁ルポ作品集』The Selected Works of Liu Binyan (2004.7)

== See also ==
- Liu Binyan
- Tibetan sovereignty debate
- Human rights in China
- List of Chinese dissidents
- Anti-Rightist Movement
- Cultural Revolution
