= Lü Jinghua =

Chinese dissident and activist (born 1960)

Lü Jinghua (Chinese: 吕京花; pinyin: Lǚ Jīnghuā; born 1960) is a Chinese dissident and activist, and was a key member of the Beijing Workers' Autonomous Federation (BWAF) during the Tiananmen Square protests of 1989. The BWAF was the People's Republic of China's (PRC) first independent trade union, established as an alternative to the Party-controlled All-China Federation of Trade Unions, and Lü served as the union's broadcaster. After the June 4th crackdown, Lü was placed on China's most wanted list, and subsequently fled to the United States.

== Early life and before Tiananmen ==
Lü was born in Chongqing to Party loyalist parents. Her father had become a Party member before the establishment of the PRC in 1949, and her mother was a neighbourhood activist during the Cultural Revolution. Lü attended Yucai Middle School, where most of her classmates were the sons and daughters of People's Liberation Army officers. She attended art school for a year and then held a number of jobs, none of them lasting for long: in a trading company in Guangzhou, on a chicken farm in the countryside near Beijing, and, in 1986, as manager of a privately owned dress shop, also called a getihu.

== Role in Tiananmen Protests ==
On her way to her dress shop located on Chang'an Avenue, Lü rode past Tiananmen on her bicycle every day, often stopping to watch protestors march past or to listen to student speeches. Although she was not very interested in politics, after the student-led hunger strike began on May 13, she started offering material support to the protestors by bringing food to various student pickets. In exchange, the students told Lü about their demands, democracy, and stories of Party corruption. As Lü recalled in the documentary The Gate of Heavenly Peace:

We workers and ordinary people had been looking on. Then, when the students started the hunger strike, using their own lives to awaken the whole nation, people felt their responsibilities, and they rose up too.

Lü began marching with the students soon after. On May 26, Lü offered her services to the recently founded Beijing Workers Autonomous Federation, initially collecting funds and aid from her friends at the dress shop. Lü was one of the only women to join the BWAF. After the students refused workers access to the central loudspeakers in the square, a broadcast station was set up in the BWAF headquarters near the western reviewing stand outside of Tiananmen. According to sociologists Andrew G. Walder and Gong Xiaoxia, the station became the most important aspect of the BWAF's presence on the square, broadcasting continuously from morning into the evening. Partially because of her booming and commanding voice, Lü became the voice for the union's public address system, reading documents submitted by ordinary workers, journalists, government office workers, and even Party cadres and soldiers. Lü read everything that was submitted including poems, manifestos, appeals for material support, song lyrics, open letters, announcements for demonstrations, and also told stories to inspire workers and bystanders.

She also helped produce handbills and leaflets using a portable mimeograph, purchased books detailing Party corruption, visited nearby factories to try and rally workers to support the students, and acted as the spokesperson for the BWAF from May 26 to June 3. In this latter role, Lü experienced first-hand the tensions between workers and students, claiming that on one occasion that when she attempted to talk to Chai Ling, Lü was turned away by students who "wanted to maintain the purity of their movement."

After troops moved into the square on June 3–4, Lü helped destroy the lists of BWAF members before evacuating. On June 8, the Martial Law Command declared the BWAF an illegal organization, ordered it to disband, and designated its leaders as among "the main instigators and organizers in the capital of the counter-revolutionary rebellion." In the aftermath of the crackdown, when many members of the BWAF were arrested, Lü spent several weeks absconding: first hiding in a friend's apartment, before fleeing to Hebei Province in the northeast, where her husband was working (her husband, Li Zhilang, would serve seven months in prison for sheltering her after the crackdown). On August 19, she was placed on the Chinese government's most wanted list as a "major criminal who has not yet been caught," being the only female worker to be on the placed on the list. Eventually Lü reached Guangzhou. There, an underground railroad had been set up by Hong Kong activists and journalists, and, on August 23, she was able to slip across the border to safety in Hong Kong. In December 1989, five months after she applied for political asylum at the U.S. consulate in Hong Kong, she arrived in Los Angeles as a political refugee.

== Life after Tiananmen ==
For a time she worked in a grocery store in Los Angeles, before moving to New York. Through her high-profile appearances and activism with human rights organizations, Lü came to the attention of the International Ladies Garment Workers Union (ILGWU), who hired her in 1990. She worked as an organizer and educator with the ILGWU until 1996 when the organization merged the Amalgamated Clothing and Textile Workers Union to form the Union of Needletrades, Industrial and Textile Employees. In 1996, she switched to building computer systems; today she sells real estate.

Since leaving China, Lu has campaigned extensively for workers rights and for democracy in China. In 1990, she met with US senators and the AFL-CIO to try and convince them to campaign for the release of Chinese workers, particularly those imprisoned in the aftermath of the Tiananmen protests. Also in 1990, she was honoured by Human Rights Watch for her efforts on behalf of imprisoned labour activists in China. As of 2017, Lü is serving as Vice Chair for the Chinese Alliance for Democracy, an organization founded in 1983 by Wang Bingzhang that advocates for human rights and the democratization of China.

Lü attempted to return to China in 1992 to see her mother and daughter, but was denied entry at Beijing Capital International Airport. In 1994, her daughter was able to join Lü in New York. When her parents died in 1998 and 1999, the Chinese government refused to grant Lü visas to attend their funerals.

In January 2011, Lü was one of the few exiled dissidents allowed to attend the funeral of Hong Kong activist and politician Szeto Wah in Hong Kong. In April 2016, Lü attempted to travel to India to attend the Interfaith Conference of China's ethnic and religious minorities, and to meet with the Dalai Lama, but was denied entry. She claimed that the Chinese government was a factor behind the cancellations, given both her role in the Tiananmen protests and the Chinese government's stance towards Tibet and the Dalai Lama. The Indian government denied this, however, arguing that Lü had applied for the wrong category of visa.
