= Ouyang Yi =

Chinese pro-democracy activist (born 1968)

- Traditional Chinese: 歐陽懿
- Simplified Chinese: 欧阳懿
Transcriptions
Standard Mandarin
- Hanyu Pinyin: Ōuyáng yì

Ouyang Yi (born 28 June 1968) is a former high-school teacher, one of the managers of a pro-democracy web site, and a member of the China Democracy Party.

== Biography ==
Ouyang was born in Suining, Sichuan Province. He graduated from Chuanbei College of Education (川北教育学院), Sichuan Province, and was a middle school teacher in Chengdu, Sichuan. He was a pro-democracy activist since the late 1980s. He was one of the managers of the web site, www.5633.com, set up in July 2002, and a member of the China Democracy Party, an organization banned by in the People’s Republic of China.

== Imprisonment ==
Ouyang was reportedly taken into custody on 4 December 2002, for the fifth time in six years, by members of the security police who searched his home and confiscated a number of documents. He was held at the Chengdu detention centre, Sichuan Province.

On 7 January 2003, Ouyang was formally charged by the Public Security Bureau with "inciting the overthrow of the State power" under article 105 of the Chinese Criminal code as amended in March 1997.

An intermediate people’s court in Chengdu in the south-west sentenced him on 16 March 2004 to two years in prison.

== Release ==
He was released on 4 December 2004, but is prohibited from publishing for two years and will be under close police supervision.
