= Li Hai =

Chinese dissident (born 1954)

- 李海
- Born: May 2, 1954 (age 72)
- Education: Peking University
- Occupation: Dissident
- Known for: Political activism, participation in the Tiananmen Square Protests of 1989
- Criminal charges: "prying into state secrets"
- Criminal penalty: 9 Years Imprisonment
- Criminal status: Released

Li Hai (Chinese: 李海, born May 2, 1954) is a Chinese dissident. He was a philosophy student at Peking University at the time of the Tiananmen Square protests of 1989. In May 1990 he was first arrested for his role in the Tiananmen protests, and later expelled from Peking University. In 1995 Li was one of 56 signatories to a pro-democracy statement, which led to another detainment. Li was charged for "prying into state secrets"—he collected data on "names, age, family situation, crime, length of sentence, location of imprisonment, treatment while imprisoned" of fellow dissidents—, and sentenced to nine years in prison in December 1996.

== See also ==
- Political repression in the People's Republic of China
