= Cyber Security Association of China =

- 中国网络空间安全协会
- Formation: March 25, 2016; 10 years ago
- Headquarters: Beijing
- Region served: China
- Website: www.cybersac.cn

The Cyber Security Association of China (CSAC) is a social organization in China focused on cybersecurity. Its headquarters is located at No.190 Chaoyangmennei, Dongcheng District, Beijing.

== History ==
The preparation for the Cyber Security Association of China began in 2014. On October 28 of that year, the State Internet Information Office approved the establishment of the preparatory group of the CASC. Since then, the association has organized various activities in the name of "Cyber Security Association of China (Preparatory)".

On March 25, 2016, the association was established in Beijing. There were 257 founding members, including more than 190 corporate members. At the first meeting of the first council of the association, Fang Binxing was elected as the first chairman of the association, and Wu Manqing, Jia Yan, Ma Minhu, Meng Dan, Li Jianhua, Qi Xiangdong, Ma Huateng , Xiao Xinguang, Zheng Zhibin, Wang Haifeng, Du Yuejin and 11 others were elected as vice chairmen. Li Yuxiao was elected as the secretary-general of the association.

In June 2016, the association sent a letter to GitHub requesting the removal of a post from the "Zhao family" list repository under the user's Programming Thoughts, claiming that it defamed Xi Jinping, the General Secretary of the Chinese Communist Party, and that the poster was suspected of murder. GitHub subsequently disabled the entire repository in mainland China and returned an HTTP 451 status code.
