= Zhao Changqing =

Chinese pro-democracy activist (born 1969)

- Traditional Chinese: 趙常青
- Simplified Chinese: 赵常青
Transcriptions
Standard Mandarin
- Hanyu Pinyin: Zhào chángqīng

Zhao Changqing (born April 1969) is a history teacher and political activist in the People’s Republic of China.

== Biography ==
Zhao Changqing hails from a small village in Shaanxi province, China. In September 1988, he entered the History department of the Shaanxi teacher training college.

=== Student activism ===
In April 1989, he and a group of classmates started a students' self-governing committee.

Arrested in June 1989 for taking part in the Tiananmen Square protests of 1989, he was imprisoned in Qincheng prison in Beijing for more than half a year, but was then discharged and sent back to his old school in Shaanxi, where he graduated in 1992.

From his graduation until 1998, Zhao worked as a teacher at the Shaanxi Hanzhong Nuclear Industry Factory 813.

=== Petition to the 15th National Congress ===
In August 1997, he petitioned the 15th National Congress of the Chinese Communist Party to introduce political reforms with his essay "Reform the political system and take the path to democratisation". In defense of fellow workers against corruption and substandard working conditions, he tried to stand for election as a factory representative to the National People Congress, on a platform critical of the All China Federation of Trade Unions. He was detained on 25 March 1998, and was tried on 6 September 1998 and sentenced to 3 years imprisonment.

=== Petition to the 16th National Congress ===
In November 2002, he was responsible for drafting the Open Letter to the 16th National Congress of the Chinese Communist Party and collecting 192 signatures to support his demands for democracy. Zhao was charged with "attempted subversion of state power" and tried behind closed doors at the Xi'an People's Court on 10 July 2003. He was sentenced to 5 years imprisonment for his crimes.

HRIC president Liu Qing denounced the trial for being "just another form of intimidation through an unfair legal process. It is especially objectionable that a trial over an open letter was held in secret on the pretext of protecting state secrets".

=== Imprisonment ===
In December 2005, he refused to participate in a flag-raising ceremony and refused to sing the national anthem, and was put into solitary confinement for 40 days. On 18 February 2006, he was again punished with solitary confinement for 3 months for refusing to take part in military drills and for receiving Falun Gong members.

He remained in prison and is on Amnesty International's watch list.

According to his Twitter (zhaochangqing89), he left China and came to the United States in December 2018.

== See also ==
- List of Chinese pro-democracy activists
