= Yutong Su =

Journalist and human rights activist

Yutong Su (Chinese: 苏雨桐) is a Chinese journalist, writer and human rights activist.

== Biography ==
According to her interview to Amnesty International, she worked as a journalist in China for four years. She left her job to become an activist online, alleging the authorities didn't allow to report the truth. She also assisted to defend vulnerable groups their rights, especially on water pollution and HIV/AIDS through contaminated blood transfusions. She was involved in commemorating Tiananmen crackdown and participated in solidarity actions for human rights defenders, including lawyer Ni Yulan. In 2010, she distributed Li Peng's Diary which were banned by the authorities. As a consequence her home was raided, she was kept under surveillance and periodically placed under house arrest. In 2010 her accounts at Sina were deleted under order from Beijing security department. With the help of international NGOs and friends, she managed to leave the country to Germany, where she continued involving her human rights work and solidarity actions, including artist Ai Weiwei.

== Career ==
In 2010 she started working in Bonn with Deutsche Welle (DW).

On 4 July 2014, Beijing-based media consultant Frank Sieren criticised in DW alleging that some Western media were unfairly critical of the Chinese government crackdown on Tiananmen demonstrations. On 19 August 2019, DW decided to not continue cooperation with her.

The New York Times and German Journalists Association DJV criticized this decision of DW.

She is currently working for Radio Free Asia (RFA).

Recently since 2022, she has met multiple harassments including sexual harassments and threats despite living in Germany as an exile, in what observers saw as an apparent transnational repression, while the German Police started investigating these harassment & stalking cases. She was also wrongly accused of bomb threats that was framed-up by anonymous individuals, along with two other journalists based in Europe who report about China, which Reporters without Borders denounced these intimidations.
