= He Depu =

Chinese dissident (born 1956)

He Depu (Chinese: 何德普; pinyin: Hé Dépǔ; born 28 October 1956) is a dissident in the People's Republic of China.

== Biography ==
He was employed at the Chinese Academy of Social Sciences in Beijing. Political activist who took part in the Democracy Wall movement, he was founder of Beijing Youth magazine in 1979.

In 1998, he helped found the proscribed China Democracy Party, but lost his job at the Social Sciences Academy after standing as a candidate in local elections in 1990.

He Depu was tried in a two-hour hearing on 14 October 2002 for his links to the outlawed China Democracy Party, of which he is a member, and for posting essays on the Internet that "incited subversion."

He was one of the 192 signatories of an Open Letter to the 16th National Congress of the Chinese Communist Party in November 2002.

On 4 November 2002, he was arrested, and received an eight-year sentence for dissident activity on the Internet on 6 November 2003.

In 2008, while in Beijing No. 2 Prison, his health began to deteriorate. He suffered from high blood pressure and did not receive appropriate treatment. In August 2008 he sent a letter to International Olympic Committee head Jacques Rogge, decrying the conditions in Chinese prisons, which he claims to have worsened.

He Depu was released from prison on 24 January 2011. The day of his release he was beaten by four police officers.
