= Weiping Qin =

Economist, current affairs commentator, columnist

Qin Weiping
- 秦伟平
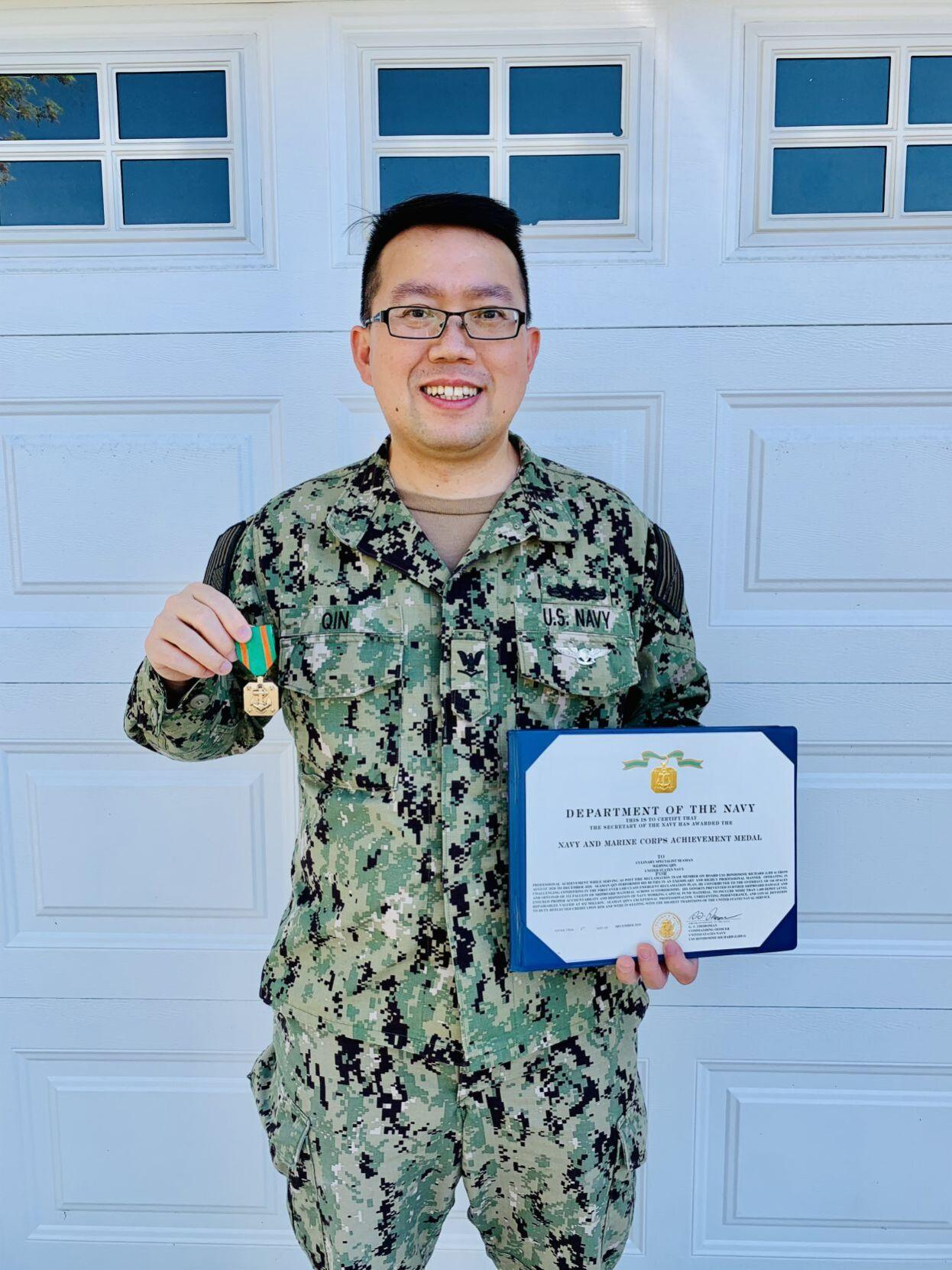
- Born: February 9, 1980 (age 46); Huanggang, Hubei, China
- Education: MBA / University of Maryland Global Campus, EMBA/ Fudan University
- Occupations: Economist, current affairs commentator, columnist.
- Years active: 2013–present
- Organization: IFCSS
- Known for: Author of “Exodus from the Crisis of China”, Weiping Show Host
- Awards: National Defense Service Medal; Navy and Marine Corps Achievement Medal; University of Maryland Global Campus Volunteer of November 2020; Military Outstanding Volunteer Service Medal; Distinguished Alumni Award

Weiping Qin (nickname :George, simplified Chinese: 秦伟平; traditional Chinese: 秦偉平; born February 1980) , is an economist, political commentator, columnist and editor of China in Perspective, a U.S. Navy veteran.

== Biography ==
Qin was born in February 1980 in Huanggang, Hubei, China. Qin was a reporter of "Chinese Electronic Commerce" magazine, and Qin was the co-founder and CEO of Shanghai BaseKing Furnishing Inc.

Qin Moved to America and established Youth Council of Chinese Democracy Party for promoting China's human rights and democracy in 2013. Qin serviced as a council member of IFCSS since 2014. Qin wrote a public letter to Chinese President Xi Jinping requesting an open dialogue about China's future crisis in 2015. He was invited to visit Dharamsala, India and had an interview with the Dalai Lama in 2016.

Qin wrote an economic and political column for CIP( China in Perspective) since 2017, and is the author of "China's Crisis Roadmap", "Exodus from the Crisis of China" and "The Winners of China's Crisis"

In 2018, Qin made a public announcement that he intended running for the U.S. Congress in 2028., and joined the U.S. Navy in 2020. Qin established the Weiping Qin Freedom Scholarship in Harford Community College, he earned a Navy and Marine Corps Achievement Medal Award and University of Maryland Global Campus Volunteer of November Award in 2020. Qin received an honorable discharge from the U. S. Navy in November 2022. On May 25, 2023, Dr. Felder presented Weiping Qin with the 2023 Harford Community College Distinguished Alumni Award.

On November 11, 2026, Qin officially announced his candidacy for the Katy ISD Board of Trustees, The election will take place in May 2027, and Qin also launched his campaign website at www. weipingqintx.com.
