= Liu Xianbin =

Chinese human rights activist (born 1968)

- Born: October 2, 1968 (age 57); Suining, Sichuan, China
- Occupation: writer
- Known for: human rights activist
- Website: Liu Xianbin essays collection on Independent Chinese Pen Center website

Liu Xianbin
- Simplified Chinese: 刘贤斌
- Traditional Chinese: 劉賢斌
Transcriptions
Standard Mandarin
- Hanyu Pinyin: Liú Xiánbīn

Liu Xianbin (born October 2, 1968) is a Chinese human rights activist. He was an organizer of China Democracy Party, writer and signer of Charter 08.

== Biography ==
Liu Xianbin was born on October 2, 1968, in Suining, Sichuan Province. In 1987, he entered the School of Labor and Human Resources at Beijing's Renmin University. As he writes in his autobiographical essay "In 1998, influenced by the "liberalization" movement, I lost faith in the rule of the Chinese Communist Party and joined with some others in organizing an anti-communist group and contributed articles to a magazine."

=== Tiananmen Square protests ===
In May 1989, Liu participated in the pro-democracy demonstrations as well as in student fasts and blocking the movement of military vehicles during the 1989 Tiananmen Square protests in and near Tiananmen Square on June 4. By then, Liu was in Sichuan where he participated in the large Chengdu June 4 demonstration.

Returning to school in Beijing after the 1989 Tiananmen Square protests and massacre, Liu wrote many posters and articles criticizing the repression and agitated for the establishment of a democratic political party in China. On April 15, 1991, he was arrested by Beijing Public Security Bureau and sent to Qiucheng prison for his democratic activism and publications. On December 28, 1992, Liu was sentenced to two and half years in prison for the crime of "counter revolutionary propaganda and incitement". He was released in October 1993.

In December 1992 the Beijing Intermediate People's Court sentenced Liu Xianbin to 2 years and 6 months of imprisonment for counter-revolutionary propaganda and agitation. He was released in October 1993 after completing his sentence.

After his release, Liu continued his democracy activism. In May 1995, he participated with Wang Dan and Liu Xiaobo in a petition drive entitled "Drawing Lessons from Blood and Promoting Democracy and the Rule of Law". The police raided his home and detained him again in July of the same year.

In March 1998, Liu wrote an open letter to the Ninth National People's Congress, demanding that the Chinese government improve human rights conditions and signed the Convention on Human Rights. In the same year, a group of dissidents in Zhejiang founded China Democracy Party (CDP). Liu arrived in Chongqing to set up the Sichuan branch for CDP. On October 15, 1998, Liu Xianbin, She Wanbao and other like-minded people went to Sichuan Bureau of Civil Affairs and registered "the Sichuan Organizing Committee of China Democracy Party". Together with She Wanbao and Ouyang Yi, he also established the temporary headquarters of China Human Rights Watch and was appointed the acting director. He organized a nationwide rescue effort for Xu Wenli, Qin Yongmin and Wang Youcai.

=== 1999 subversion conviction ===
In the mid-1990s, Liu Xianbin was active as an organizer for the China Democratic Party. In 1999, Liu was arrested in Beijing and was detained for a month in the Beijing Detention Center. Then he was sent back to Suining and was put under house arrest. On July 7, he was criminally detained by the Suining Public Security Bureau at the Lingquan Temple Detention Center in Suining city.

On August 6, 1999, he was convicted of "subversion of state power" by the Suining City, Sichuan Intermediate People's Court and sentenced to 13 years imprisonment and deprivation of political rights for three years for subversion of state power. On November 6, 2008, he was released after completing his sentence with allowance for time served and good behavior after 9 years and four months in Sichuan's Chuandong prison.

After his release from prison in November 2008, Liu became one of the first signatories to Charter 08, a document calling for democratic reform.

=== Detention since June 2010 ===
Liu Xianbin noted in his account of his police interrogation of March 2010 that public security asked him about four articles that had appeared on foreign websites. Liu concluded his account saying he was allowed to go home after interrogation this time, but his arrest was just a matter of time.

On June 27, 2010, Liu Xianbin was detained on suspicion of “inciting subversion of state power.” Suining, Sichuan Public Security Bureau on July 21, 2010, sent a recommendation to the Suining Procuratorate that Liu be indicted for inciting subversion of state power. The Suining Public Security Bureau's advice to the prosecutors lists several statements made by Liu Xianbin in his many articles published in Chinese magazines and websites overseas which it found subversive.

The "Indictment Advice" notes that Liu "wrote and transmitted through the Internet articles for publication. These articles appeared in publications outside the borders of mainland China such as People and Human Rights, Beijing Spring, China Weekly, Democratic China, China Human Rights Semi-weekly. He slandered the people's democratic dictatorship political power led by the Chinese Communist Party as "autocratic rule" and on several occasions incited the overthrow of our country's political regime and socialist system."

According to news reports citing his wife, he was sentenced to ten years in prison in March 2011.

== Works ==
Many of Liu Xianbin's articles are available online at the Chinese Independent Pen Center website including:

- "Baptism of Blood and Fire",
- "Liu Xianbin: 100 Days Since Release from Prison",
- "A Late Remembrance: Remembering the Death of Zhao Ziyang Five Years Later ",
- "Looking at China with Vaclav Havel's Eyes",
- "Street Actions are an Important Tactic for the Chinese Democratic Movement",
- "A Discussion Starting From 'The People Are Masters in Their Own Homes'",
- "Choices for the Chinese Movement After the Heavy Sentence that Liu Xiaobo Received", and
- "My Twenty Years in the China Democracy Movement -- The Arrest of Chen Wei, Part 1",

== See also ==
- Hu Jia (activist)
- Weiquan movement
- Corruption in China
