= Li Hongkuan =

Chinese dissident (born 1963)

Li Hongkuan (Chinese: 李洪宽)
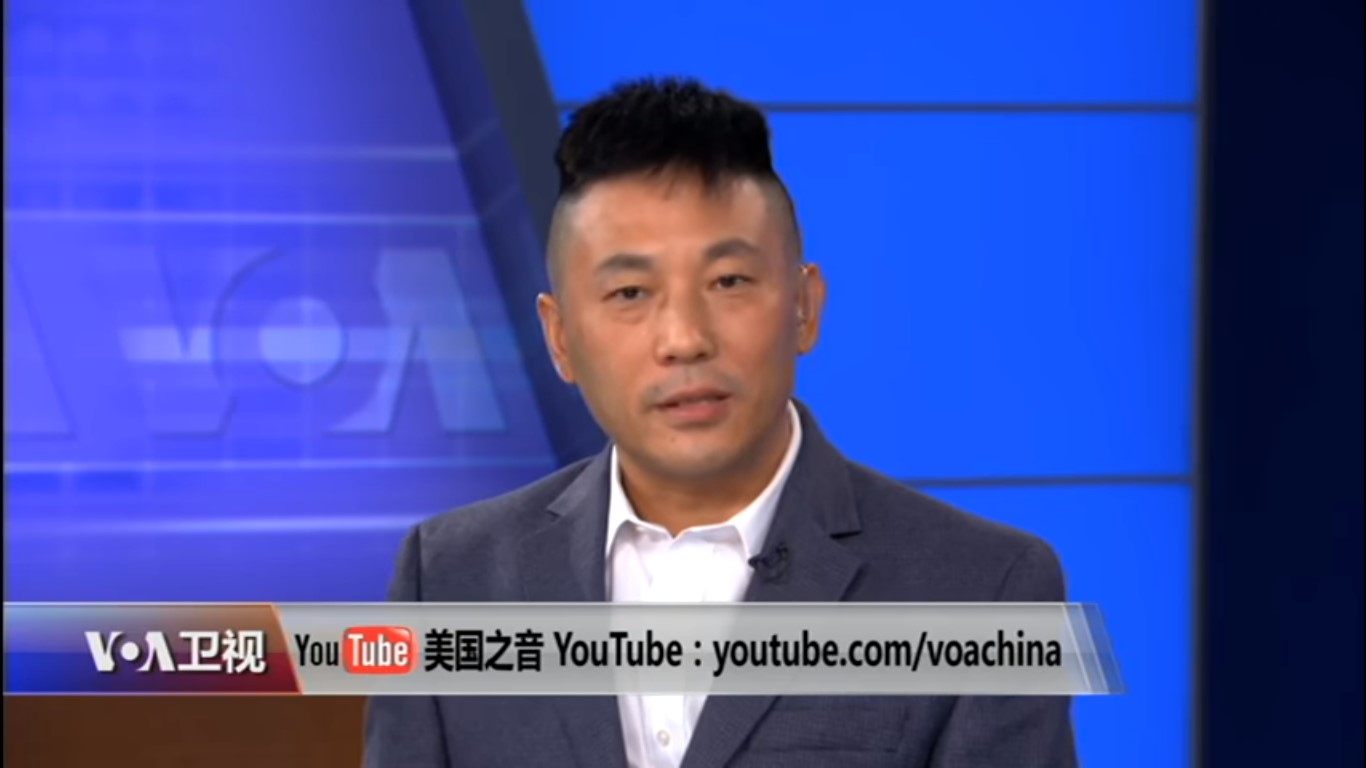
- Li Hongkuan during an interview on the Voice of America, Chinese desk. July 25, 2017
- Born: March 26, 1963 (age 62); Dezhou, Shandong
- Education: Nanjing University, Shanghai Institute of Biochemistry and Cell Biology, Chinese Academy of Sciences, Albert Einstein College of Medicine
- Occupation(s): dissident, writer, publisher of online magazines
- Awards: "Prominent News and Culture Award" (Chinese: 万人杰新闻文化奖)

Li Hongkuan (Chinese: 李洪宽; pinyin: Lí Hóngkuān; born March 26, 1963) is a Chinese dissident.

== Biography ==
Li Hongkuan was born in Dezhou, Shandong. He graduated from Nanjing University and Shanghai Institute of Biochemistry and Cell Biology, Chinese Academy of Sciences. After graduation, he became a teacher of Beijing Medical University (Today's Peking University Health Science Center).

In 1989, Li participated in Tiananmen Square protests and later was persecuted by the Chinese Communist Party. From 1991 to 1994, Li studied for a Ph.D. in Molecular Biology at Albert Einstein College of Medicine in New York.

In late 1997, Li began publishing online magazines under the name Big News (大参考). Li founded Small News (小参考), a news journal similar to Big News, in 1998. The aim of the two magazines is to break through the Great Firewall of China and send news about Chinese dissidents and Chinese Opposition Movement to the Chinese domestic e-mail address.

Li has also been interviewed by the Voice of America, Radio Free Asia, and other media, and also volunteering as current affairs commentators in some well-known programs.

In 1999, Li was awarded the "Prominent News and Culture Award" (万人杰新闻文化奖).

== See also ==
- Chinese democracy movement
- List of Chinese dissidents
