= China Weekly =

Weekly news magazine

China Weekly 中国周刊
- Publisher: China Weekly Editorial Office
- Founded: 5 May 2009
- Political alignment: Communism; Socialism with Chinese characteristics
- Language: Chinese
- Headquarters: Beijing
- ISSN: 1671-3117
- OCLC number: 1181951992
- Website: chinaweekly.cn

China Weekly (Chinese: 中国周刊), also known as Zhongguo Zhoukan, is a comprehensive weekly news magazine published in simplified Chinese in the People's Republic of China.

China Weekly was inaugurated by media personnel Zhu Defu (朱德付) on 5 May 2009 in Beijing, supervised by the Central Committee of the Communist Youth League of China and sponsored by China Profiles Newspaper Office (中华儿女报刊社).

== Controversies ==
China Weekly Agency Company Limited (中国周刊社有限公司) was sued by Liu Lei (刘磊) for infringement of photographs in 2012. Although the China Weekly paid the author's remuneration, the court held that the scope of Liu Lei's photography authorization to the company was limited to China Weekly No.11, 2011, and did not include the partner website. The court ruled that the company should bear the legal liability of making an apology, stopping the infringement and compensating the loss.
