= Xie Wanjun =

Chinese dissident

Xie Wanjun (simplified Chinese: 谢万军; traditional Chinese: 謝萬軍; pinyin: Xiè Wànjūn; Wade–Giles: Hsieh Wan-chün) (born 10 July 1967) is a Chinese political activist who has fled to the United States. The chairman of China Democracy Party, he was an active student during the Tiananmen Square Protests of 1989. On 17 October 1996, he led an anti-Japan protest and was imprisoned for a month. In August 1997, he tried to apply a trade union in Shanghai but he was expelled from Shanghai. He was one of the founding members of China Democracy Party in 1998, and was elected to the central committee in February 1999, he escaped from China in April 1999, he then fled to Russia then the United States.

In 2022, he falsely claimed that corrupt officials in Henan had begun armed resistance against the central government of China. On 19 October 2026, he falsely claimed that North Korean leader Kim Jong Un had died and that China had sent 9,000 troops to occupy Pyongyang amid fears of a succession crisis. The false claim was reported as true by international outlets such as The Sun and the New York Post.
