= Wang Bingzhang (dissident) =

Chinese dissident

Wang Bingzhang (Chinese: 王炳章; pinyin: Wáng Bǐngzhāng; born December 30, 1947) is a Chinese human rights activist and founder of two Chinese pro-democracy movements. He was abducted in Vietnam in June 2002 and detained by Chinese secret police. The Chinese government announced his detention in December 2002, charging him with espionage and terrorism. He was sentenced to life in prison and is considered a political prisoner of China.

== Biography ==
Wang Bingzhang was born on December 30, 1947, in Shijiazhuang, Hebei, China. He graduated from Beijing Medical University and served as a doctor for eight years. In 1979, he was sponsored by the Chinese government to study abroad in McGill University, Canada where he obtained his Ph.D. degree in pathology in 1982. Wang Bingzhang is the first citizen of the People's Republic of China to get a doctorate degree in North America.

In 1982, Wang established China Spring, the first pro-democracy Chinese magazine overseas. The next year, he launched the 中国民主团结联盟 (translated variously as "Alliance for Democratic China"/"China Alliance for Democracy"/"Union of Chinese Democracy Movement"), publicly denouncing the one-party rule in China. He later traveled back to China and co-founded two opposition parties, the Chinese Freedom Democracy Party and Chinese Democracy Justice Party in 1989 and 1998, respectively. The latter led to his arrest in China. He was expelled from the country, but was not sentenced.

In June 2002, Wang went to Vietnam with Yue Wu and Zhang Qi where they were captured. In December 2002, the Chinese government announced his arrest after six months in custody.

In March 2006, Wang was punished for misbehaving when he went on hunger strike to plead for release to pay a final respect to his father at his funeral; but he was handcuffed by and locked with a jail guard in his jail cell. This resulted in prolonged punishment. Visitation rights were restored in November 2006. According to Dr. Bing Wu Wang, Wang's younger brother, his physical health had deteriorated rapidly since the last visitation. This was due, according to Wang, to a new prison warden who served much lower food quality, harsher physical abuse and intense political study sessions.

Various international organizations, including the United Nations, Amnesty International, Human Rights Watch, Worldrights, and the Raoul Wallenberg Centre for Human Rights have voiced their opposition to Dr. Wang's imprisonment, saying China is arbitrarily detaining him. The United States and Canadian legislatures have both passed legislative bills in support of Wang and in denunciation of the CCP's actions. Freedom House awarded Dr Wang the 2024 Freedom Award.

== See also ==
- Chinese democracy movement
- List of Chinese dissidents
- List of Chinese pro-democracy activists
