= Wang Ruowang =

Chinese dissident (1918–2001)

- Born: Shouhua (寿华); 4 February 1918; Wujin, Jiangsu, China
- Died: 19 December 2001 (aged 83); Queens, New York City, United States
- Occupation: Author
- Spouses: Li Ming, Yang Zi

Wang Ruowang (Chinese: 王若望; pinyin: Wáng Rùowàng; Wade–Giles: Wang Jo-wang; 4 February 1918 – 19 December 2001) was a Chinese author and dissident who was imprisoned various times for political reasons by both the Kuomintang and the Communist government of China for advocating reform and liberalization. His name at birth was "Shouhua" (traditional Chinese: 壽華; simplified Chinese: 寿华; pinyin: Shòuhuá), but he was most commonly known by his pen name, "Ruowang". He was a prolific essayist and literary critic.

Wang was a member of the Chinese Communist Party from 1937 to 1957, when he was expelled for holding "rightist views". He rejoined the party in 1979, but in 1987 he was again expelled by Deng Xiaoping for promoting "bourgeois liberalization". After his death in exile in New York City, he was widely eulogized as one of the Chinese government's most significant social and political critics.

== Biography ==
=== Early life ===
In 1932, when Wang was fifteen years old, he was expelled from school for taking part in a student demonstration. He joined the Communist Youth League later that year. In 1933 he moved to Shanghai, where he began work at a pharmaceutical factory while operating as a low-level Communist agent. While working at this factory he founded a publication, Toilet Literature, a newspaper that was distributed by being pasted on the walls of the factory workers' bathroom area. After writing an article in which he mocked Chiang Kai-shek for allowing the Japanese to seize Manchuria, he was arrested in May 1934, and sentenced to ten years in prison. After the outbreak of the Second Sino-Japanese War in 1937, Chiang Kai-shek declared a "united front" with the Communists against the Japanese, and Wang was released after serving only three and a half years of his sentence as part of a general amnesty. Some of the Communists imprisoned with Wang became successful officials after the Communist victory in 1949: one became the governor of Guangdong, and another became the deputy governor of Anhui.

After Wang's release, in 1937, he joined the Chinese Communist Party (CCP) and traveled to the CCP's revolutionary base area in Yan'an. After arriving, Wang wrote one of the first biographical articles on Mao Zedong, and edited cultural journals intended to be circulated among peasants. He joined the CCP in order to "fight evil, autocracy and oppression", but was persecuted during the Yan'an Rectification Movement for writing for a controversial wall newspaper, Light Cavalry, which was condemned by Party leaders for discussing dark and unsavory aspects of life in Yan'an. One of his friends was killed during the purge. After the purge, Wang was forced by Mao's lieutenant, Kang Sheng, to leave Yan'an and travel to Japanese-occupied Shandong as a low-level CCP agent, where he survived only "through the kindness of peasants". Here, despite his endorsement of Luo Ronghuan, criticized the leadership of the CCP, and was labeled the "Wang Shiwei of Shandong" and a secret agent, but was saved from this label and grave consequences by Luo. After entering Japanese-occupied China, Wang was briefly imprisoned by the Japanese, but was released.

=== Early conflict with the Communist Party ===
After the Japanese surrendered, in 1945, Wang was pardoned by Kang. He returned to Shanghai, where he worked at the East China Bureau Propaganda Department. He became a co-editor of a prominent local newspaper, and gained a reputation as an essayist and literary critic. In 1956, after Mao encouraged writers to criticize the CCP in the "Hundred Flowers Campaign", Wang published ten articles critical of the Communist Party. These articles made him an early victim of the subsequent "Anti-Rightist Campaign", when those who had followed Mao's directions and spoken out were persecuted as "rightists". After being identified as a "rightist", Wang was expelled from the Party, lost his job, and was forced to work at a forced labour camp in the countryside. His wife, Li Ming, was also persecuted for her association with him. After refusing to condemn him, she also lost her job and suffered a mental breakdown.

The Communist Party removed Wang's "rightist" label in 1962, but soon after Wang angered the Party again by publishing a story, "History of a Cauldron", in which he satirized the policies of the Great Leap Forward as cruel, impractical, and ironic. This story led the local leader of the Communist Party, Ke Qingshi, to renew the Party's attacks on Wang and his family. Before she died, in 1964, Wang's wife begged him to protect his family by never writing again. Wang blamed the Communist Party for her death.

After the Cultural Revolution began in 1966, Wang was persecuted as a "counterrevolutionary". He was imprisoned for four years in the same prison building that the Kuomintang had imprisoned him in during the 1930s, enduring conditions that he later described as "fascist brutality". Wang remained a political outcast until 1979, following Deng Xiaoping's ascent to power, when Wang was allowed to rejoin the Communist Party as part of a national programme to rehabilitate those unjustly persecuted during the Cultural Revolution. Following his political rehabilitation, he continued to criticize the government and agitated for greater human rights and democratic reforms.

Following Wang's rehabilitation, he was assigned to work as the deputy director of a Shanghai literary magazine. He resumed his literary career, becoming a member of the councils of both the Shanghai Writers' Association and the China Writers Association. In 1980, he published an autobiographical novel, Hunger Trilogy, which included a semi-fictional account of his time in both Kuomintang and Communist political prisons. In the book, Wang recalled how the Communists' political prisons had been much more cruel than Kuomintang political prisons. The book angered many CCP officials by asserting that, although Chiang's and Mao's dictatorships used hunger as a weapon against their political opponents, Mao was more systematic and ruthless. Hunger Trilogy is the most well-known of Wang's books to be translated into English, and was well-received abroad. Within China, the article of his that gained the most attention was published in 1986, titled "One-Party Dictatorship Can Only Lead to Tyranny".

=== Involvement with student protests ===
In December 1986, college students demonstrated in over a dozen Chinese cities in order to agitate for greater economic and political freedoms. Deng Xiaoping, after two straight weeks of student demonstrations, came to the conclusion that the student movement was a result of "bourgeois liberalization", and named three Communist Party members to be expelled: Fang Lizhi, Liu Binyan, and Wang Ruowang. Deng personally attacked Wang for being "wildly presumptuous", and accused him of five "major mistakes", including a belief that Chinese socialism was "feudal or semi-feudal in essence". Because he was the oldest of the three protest leaders, Wang later gained a reputation as "the grandfather of Chinese dissidents". Of the three, he remained in China the longest.

Deng directed then-CCP General Secretary Hu Yaobang to expel them from the Party, but Hu refused. Because of his refusal and a variety of other factors, Hu was dismissed from his position as General Secretary in January 1987, effectively ending his period of influence within the Chinese government.

Following Wang's second expulsion from the Communist Party, Party officials attempted to mediate with Wang to change Wang's critical opinion of them, but were unsuccessful. In an interview with a reporter from Hong Kong in 1988, Wang came close to advocating the abolition of the Chinese Communist Party. When the Tiananmen Square protests began in 1989, Wang wrote a letter to Deng in support of the protesters, and organized a student march on Shanghai's city hall. The Tiananmen protests were suppressed in the 4 June "Tiananmen Massacre", and Wang went into hiding in the countryside on 14 June. His friends influenced him to return to Shanghai on 19 June by convincing him that he would not be arrested.

Wang was one of the few senior leaders of the Tiananmen protests who did not escape China. Following his return to Shanghai, Wang was put under house arrest until he was formally charged for his involvement in the demonstrations on 8 September 1989. He was accused in the Chinese media of "listening to the Voice of America and spreading rumors based on its broadcasts, writing articles in support of the student hunger strike, giving counterrevolutionary speeches on Shanghai's People's Square... publishing articles in the Hong Kong press", and trying to "overthrow the Party's leadership" with his writing. Wang was sentenced to fourteen months in prison. After his release from prison, his activities were closely watched by the government.

=== Life in exile ===
In 1992, following pressure from the American government, Wang was allowed to leave his home in Shanghai, in order to accept a temporary position as a visiting scholar at Columbia University, in New York City. He lived as an exile in the United States from then until his death, but always dreamed of returning to China. He traveled widely through North America, attempting to unite other exiled Chinese dissidents in a common cause, but was unsuccessful.

He died on 19 December 2001, two weeks after his doctors discovered that he had terminal lung cancer. One week before Wang's death the Chinese government offered to allow Wang to return to China on the condition that he not publish articles critical of the Chinese government or meet with local dissidents, but he refused. He was sent to Elmhurst Hospital in New York City, where he died. He was survived by his second wife, Yang Zi, and seven children. Two of his children flew from Shanghai to be with him before he died.

Following Wang's death, the Chinese government arrested ten men in Shanghai for discussing the possibility of a memorial service for Wang. Hundreds of people visited his memorial service in New York, including the most significant Chinese exiles then living in the United States. Some of those present included Liu Binyan, Fang Lizhi, Yan Jiaqi, Harry Wu, Wei Jingsheng, Xiao Qiang, Wang Dan, Tang Baiqiao, Cao Changqing, Chen Pokong and Gao Zhan. A representative of The Dalai Lama, who Wang had met several times following his exile, eulogized him at the memorial as a "freedom fighter".
