= Qelbinur Sidik =

Kelbinur Sidik
- Born: Urumqi, Xinjiang
- Other names: Kalbinur Sidik
- Occupation: Language teacher
- Known for: Human rights activism

Kelbinur Sidik (also spelled Qelbinur Sidik) is a human rights activist from China’s ethnic Uzbek minority. Having fled persecution by the Chinese communist government, she now speaks about the human rights abuses faced by ethnic and religious minorities in China.

== Biography ==
Sidik was born in Urumqi, Xinjiang. She has worked as a Mandarin language teacher since 1999. In 2016, the Uyghur region came under control of Chen Quanguo, previous governor of the Tibet province. That year, Sidik was forcibly moved to state-run concentration camps to teach Mandarin to ethnic Uyghurs. There she witnessed human rights abuses, torture, and sexual violence against detainees, and was told if she reported any of her sightings, she and her family would be enrolled in the camps. In 2017, Sidik was assigned to a camp for women where she reportedly witnessed 10,000 women with shaved heads having been detained for unauthorized international travel. Her account of this camp included regular sexual and physical abuse, as well as mental breakdowns being a regularity.

She was denied basic rights and was barred from travel, eventually undergoing forced sterilization, causing medical complications. Eventually, she was granted permission to fly to the Netherlands to seek medical treatment and there decided to seek asylum. Despite threats and harassment by the Chinese government, Sidik continues her work exposing the atrocities at the camps and the persecution of Uyghurs in China. She has testified before the United States Congress on these human rights abuses and lectures internationally.
