= Qin Yongmin =

Chinese political commentator

Qin Yongmin 秦永敏
- Born: 11 August 1953 (age 73); Wuhan, China
- Occupations: Writer, political commentator, human rights activist

Qin Yongmin
- Simplified Chinese: 秦永敏
- Traditional Chinese: 秦永敏
Transcriptions
Standard Mandarin
- Hanyu Pinyin: Qín Yǒngmǐn

Qin Yongmin (Chinese: 秦永敏; pinyin: Qín Yǒngmǐn) (born 11 August 1953) is a Chinese author, political commentator, human rights activist and co-founder of the Democratic Party of China.

Qin was a worker of Wuhan Steel Corporation. At the end of the 1970s, he edited and published "The Bell", a journal in Wuhan promoting democracy. In 1980, he participated in establishing "The preparatory group of the Democracy Party of China". He was arrested in 1981 and sentenced to eight years in prison for "counter-revolutionary propaganda and incitement sin". He was released from prison in 1989.

Qin participated in the launch of the "Peace Charter" movement in Beijing on 14 January 1993. He was the drafter of "Peace Charter", the first program for a democracy movement in China after 1949. The charter demanded redress for the suppression of the Tiananmen Square protests of 1989 and release of political prisoners. Qin was then convicted of the crime of "disturbing social order" and sentenced to two years' re-education through labor.

In 1997, Qin published an open letter to Jiang Zemin, demanding the Chinese Communist Party carry out political reform in China in order to achieve constitutional democracy. He founded "The Communication of PRC Human Rights Watch" in Wuhan in 1998, and published hundreds of reports on human rights in China. In the same year, Qin publicly established the Hubei Province Committee of The Democracy Party of China. He was arrested and sentenced to 12 years in prison for "subversion of state power".

In 1999, while incarcerated, Qin was elected as one of four co-chairmen of the Democracy Party of China. The same year, Qin and DPC members Xu Wenli and Wang Youcai were rumored to be nominated for the Nobel Peace Prize, although the claims were denied by the Nobel Committee.

Qin Yongmin was released from prison in November 2010. Qin continued his promotion of democracy and human rights in China. He was detained without trial numerous times.

Due to his views that China should allow freedom of speech, publication, association, and the exercise of all basic human rights, including organizing political parties, for decades Qin has been subjected to imprisonment, arrest, criminal and administrative detention, re-education through labor and residential surveillance. In the 43 years from 1970 to 2012, he was arrested or detained 39 times, sentenced to imprisonment for a total of 22 years, and become one of the longest-serving political prisoners in the People's Republic of China. He has stated that he will not leave China until constitutional democracy has been realized.

At the end of another three years in detention, Qin was sentenced, in July 2018, to 13 years in prison for "subversion of state power". While conceding that Qin had not engaged in any act of violence, the court listed his crimes: he had written articles and published a book in Hong Kong advocating a peaceful transition to democracy for China and had issued statements, organized pro-democracy groups and organized shared meals and meetings.

== See also ==
- List of Chinese pro-democracy activists
