= Xu Wenli =

Chinese dissident

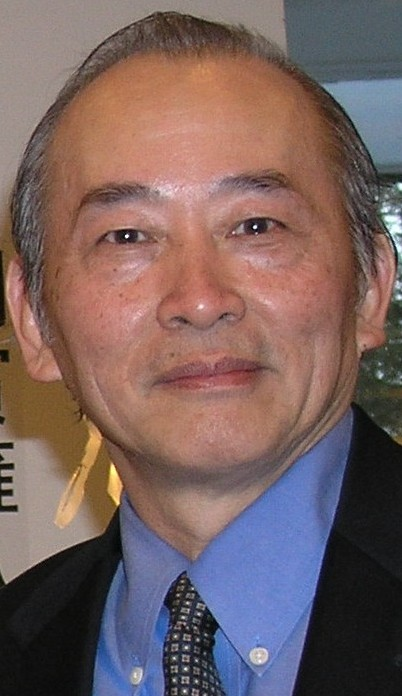
- Born: 9 July 1943 (age 82); Anfu, Jiangxi, China
- Political party: Democracy Party of China
- Spouse: He Xintong
- Children: Jin Feiszli

Xu Wenli (Chinese: 徐文立) (born on 9 July 1943) is a Chinese political activist and one of the leaders of the China Democracy Party. Xu organized and participated in the Democracy Wall movement and acted as the chief editor for the journal April Fifth Forum. Xu was twice arrested by the Chinese government and sentenced to a total of 28 years in jail, of which he served 16. After his exile to the United States on 24 December 2002, Xu received an honorary doctorate degree from Brown University, and has since worked at the university's Watson Institute for International and Public Affairs as a senior research fellow.

== Early life and imprisonment ==
Xu Wenli's ancestral home is in Anqing, Anhui Province, China. He was born in Anfu County, Jiangxi Province, China, on 9 July 1943, during the Second Sino-Japanese War. His father, Xu Yuwen, was a general officer in the war, serving as a surgeon and the director of the Rear Hospital. After Chinese victory on 15 August 1945, Xu and his parents relocated to Nanjing, the new capital of the Kuomintang National Government. Afterwards, Xu successively lived in Chu County in Anhui Province, Fuzhou City in Fujian Province and Anqing City in Anhui Province, where he graduated from elementary school. In 1957, he left for Changchun City in Jilin Province to study at the High School Affiliated to Northeast Normal University, together with his eldest sister. In 1960, he left for Beijing to live with his mother and his second eldest sister and brother, while studying at Beijing No.7 High School (Bei Jing Shi Di Qi Zhong Xue). In 1963, after finishing high school with an outstanding performance, Xu decided not to apply for college because of his dissatisfaction towards the Chinese higher education system and its teaching methods. Determined to be an independent thinker and learner, Xu self-taught himself philosophy, political science, history, world literature, and supported himself on several study trips to the Chinese countryside from 1963 to 1964. Between the years of 1964 and 1969, Xu served in the People's Liberation Army Naval Air Force. After his demobilization, Xu worked at the Beijing Railroad Branch from 1969 to 1981. In 1977, he applied to the publication history major in the Journalism Department at Beijing University. On 9 April 1981, Xu was arrested.

As a key organizer and active participant, Xu played an instrumental role in the Chinese Democracy Wall movement of the late 1970s. He served as Chief Editor of April Fifth Forum, the first journal of the Democracy Wall movement to be privately run by civilians. The journal's main partners were Zhao Nan and Lv Pu. Under Xu's leadership, the April Fifth Forum became the longest-lasting civilian-run publication of the Democracy Wall Movement, publishing a total of 17 issues between November 1978 and January 1980.

In establishing a political opposition party, Xu met and had discussions with Wang Xizhe, Sun Weibang, and Liu Er'an, at Ganjiakou, Beijing, China, from 10–12 June 1980. As a result, Xu was found guilty in 1981 of the crime of organizing counterrevolutionary groups.

On 15 November 1980, Xu proposed a comprehensive reform of Chinese society in his "Gengshen Reform Proposal". On 1 October 1979, he participated in organizing and leading a series of events including the "Stars" (Xingxing) art exhibition demonstration. Therefore, in 1981, Xu was found guilty of spreading counter revolutionary propaganda and incitement.

Xu was arrested on 9 April 1981, and sentenced to 15 years in prison with revocation of all political rights for 4 years in 1982.

He was emancipated on 26 May 1993, after which he dedicated his time travelling to prepare for and advance ideas of forming a Chinese opposition party.

On 29 November 1997, Xu, proposed a political program to "end the single-party system, establish the Third Republic, rebuild constitutional democracy, and protect human rights and freedom" and the political route of "transparency, rationality, peace, and non-violence", and established a Chinese opposition party with Qin Yongmin and dissidents from across the nation. On 9 November 1998, Xu, together with Zha Jianguo, Gao Hongming, He Depu, and Liu Shizun, established the Beijing and Tianjin branches of the China Democracy Party. He was arrested on the 30th of that month, and sentenced to 13 years in prison with revocation of all political rights for 3 years.

== Exile ==
On 24 December 2002, Xu was exiled to America on grounds of medical parole.

== Recognition ==
New York Times hails Xu Wenli as "China's Most Prominent Political Prisoner." Amnesty International regarded Xu a prisoner of conscience.

Nancy Pelosi says, "Mr. Xu is one of China's bravest, most eloquent and also most measured advocates of democracy."

Washington Post claims, "In the struggle for the values that matter most, Mr. Xu and his compatriots, not their captors, should be recognized as America's true partners."

BBC terms Xu Wenli "The Godfather of Dissent."

== Current status ==
Original "Rational Structure of Human Society" in prison.

On 26 May 2003, Xu was awarded an honorary doctorate by Brown University.

Xu worked at Brown's Watson Institute of International Studies as a senior research fellow from 2003 to 2013.

Since 28 January 2004, Xu has been teaching an International Relations Seminar Class titled "Chinese Democracy Wall: History of Chinese Democracy, Chinese Modern History and Chinese History." 26 March 2003: Founded the Caring for China Center (CCC) and is currently the chairman.

3 December 2004: Founded the China Democracy Party Overseas Exile Headquarters, and is currently the general convener of the Headquarters.

9 March 2005: Reiterated his political program: "To abandon one-party dictatorship, lay aside the issue of Taiwanese independence, restore a democratic China, and build an equal and prosperous federation."

15 May 2006: Proposed A Direction and Timeline Regarding the Implementation of Political Reform on Mainland China on behalf of the China Democracy Party Overseas Exile Headquarters to the Chinese Government in the People's Republic of China.

5 June 2007: Elected Chairman for the China Democracy Party's Joint Headquarters at the first Overseas Representatives Assembly. This assembly espoused the three key objectives, namely to 1) emulate the First Asian Republic as initiated by the forerunners of the 1911 Xinhai Revolution; 2) honor the establishment of the Second Republic during the 1946 National Constitution Assembly; and, 3) build a Third Chinese Republic on the principles of freedom, prosperity, equality of human rights, and constitutional democracy.

2008: Finished studies on "The Two Cornerstones of a Free Democratic Society and the Three Fulcrums of a Normal Human Society". 15 November: published the book A Survey of the Normal Human Social Order in Hong Kong.

25 September 2009: Launched the signing of the "Peace Agreement", a public letter to leaders across the Taiwan Strait, aiming to build a constitutional democratic China based on "The Three Haves of Citizens". (Announced on The New York Times)

2010: Successfully participated in the nomination of Liu Xiaobo for the Nobel Peace Prize.

March 2010: Started launching the around-the-world torch relay titled "Towards A Republic. Passing the Torch. In Remembrance of the Founding of the Country from the Xinhai Revolution."

6 June 2011: Re-elected as the chairman of the National Joint Headquarters of the China Democracy Party at its Second Overseas Representatives Assembly.

In 2013, at age 70, Xu retired from Brown University. On 9 July, Xu voluntarily resigned from the chairman position at the China Democracy Party's Joint Headquarters.

== See also ==
- Democracy Wall

== Published works ==
- 1996 《Prison Letter》
- 2001 《My Youth and Life are to be Dedicated to My Beloved Chinese Nation》
- 2008 《A Theoretical Inquiry into the Rational Structure of Human Society》
- 2020 《Rational Structure of Human Society》
- 2021 《Prison in prison and prison outside prison》
- 2022 《Anthology of Xu Wenli's Twenty Years in Exile》
