= Wang Youcai =

Tiananmen Square Student Leader

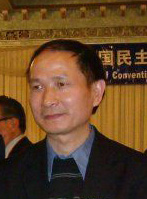
Wang Youcai

Wang Youcai (Chinese: 王有才; pinyin: Wáng Yǒucái, born 29 June 1966) is a Chinese dissident and was one of the prominent student leaders in the Tiananmen Square protests of 1989. At the time he was graduate student at the Peking University, he was arrested in 1989 and sentenced to four years in 1991 for "conspiring to overthrow the Government of China".

He was released early, in November 1991, due to the help of former U.S. Secretary of State James Baker, who visited Beijing in 1991.

On 25 June 1998, he and his colleagues organized the China Democracy Party, which was subsequently banned by the Chinese government. In December 1998 the Chinese government sentenced him to 11 years in prison for subversion. He was released from prison and exiled in 2004 under international political pressure, especially from the United States.

Wang was a visiting scholar at Fairbank Center at Harvard University for one year, and completed his master's degree at the University of Illinois at Urbana-Champaign in 2006. He is a member of the WikiLeaks advisory board. He is one of the members of the Chinese Constitutional Democratic Transition Research and one of the members of the Coordinative Service Platform of China Democracy Party. On 15 July 2009, he became co-advisor of Overseas Supporters' Association of the China Democracy Party, and later became co-executive associate for Committee of Exiled members of the China Democracy Party on 10 October 2009.

He did his Ph.D. research on quark transversity at National Jefferson Laboratory in Newport News, Virginia from June 2007 to June 2010. He was awarded a Ph.D. degree in physics at the University of Illinois at Urbana-Champaign in 2011. He worked at American Express in New York from February 2011 to December 2012. Then he joined Citi and worked there from 2 January 2013 to 20 June 2022.
