= Liu Binyan =

Chinese writer and journalist (1925–2005)

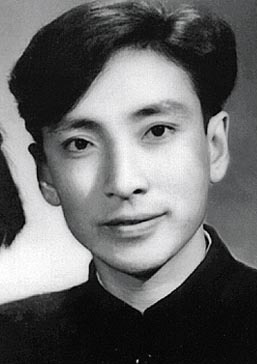
Liu Binyan, in 1951.

Liu Binyan (Chinese: 刘宾雁; pinyin: Liú Bīnyàn; 7 February 1925 – 5 December 2005) was a Chinese author, journalist, and political dissident.

Many of the events in Liu's life are recounted in his memoir, A Higher Kind of Loyalty.

== Early life ==
Liu Binyan, whose family hails from Shandong province, was born in 1925, in the city of Changchun, Jilin Province. He grew up in Harbin, in Heilongjiang province, where he went to school until the ninth grade, after which he had to withdraw for lack of tuition money. He persisted in reading voraciously, especially works about World War II, and in 1944, he joined the Chinese Communist Party (CCP). After 1949 he worked as a reporter and editor for China Youth News and began a long career of writing rooted in an iron devotion to social ideals, an affection for China's ordinary people, and an insistence on honest expression even at the cost of great personal sacrifice.

== Outspoken Critic in Early Years of PRC ==
Liu Binyan published influential critiques of the consequences of Party management in the 1950s. In rapid succession he encountered recognition, approval, criticism, and finally prosecution for crimes against the Party. In October 1955, he acted as the interpreter for visiting Soviet writer Valentin Ovechkin, who later tried to help Liu Binyan by writing a letter to Zhou Enlai. Liu Binyan learned from Ovechkin's style and wrote the work "On the Bridge Worksite".

=== A Pair of Articles with a Big Impact ===
In 1956, he published "On the Bridge Worksite" (《在桥梁工地上》 "Zai qiaoliang gongdi shang"), which exposed bureaucratism and corruption, and "The Inside Story of Our Newspaper" ( 《本报内部消息》 "Benbao neibu xiaoxi"), about press control. The two works had a powerful nationwide impact.

According to Liu, "'On the Bridge Construction Site' had been the first piece to criticize the Party itself since Mao Zedong had laid down the dictum in 1942 in his 'Talks at the Yan'an Forum' that writers should 'extol the bright side of life' and 'not expose' the darkness.

=== Labeled a "Rightist" ===
Liu Binyan was labeled a "rightist" during the 1957 anti-rightist campaign. This followed the publication of "On the Bridge Worksite" and "The Inside Story of Our Newspaper," and expelled from the CCP (see Hundred Flowers Campaign). The campaign against Liu Binyan was closely associated with the campaign against another social critic and author, Wang Meng, who had recently published a highly influential work, "A New Arrival at the Organization Department."

=== Interim Years ===
After being rehabilitated in the 1960s, he again fell out of favor in 1969, and was condemned to a forced labor detention camp, where he spent eight years. After being rehabilitated again, he built up a sound reputation as a reformer and a corruption watchdog. From 1957 onward, he spent a total of 21 years in and out of labor camps.

== Second Big Impact: People or Monsters in 1979 ==
In 1978, after the "rightist" label was removed, Liu was re-admitted to the CCP but continued, in even starker terms than before, to write "reportage literature" (baogao wenxue) about injustices and the sufferings of ordinary people.

People or Monsters (《人妖之间》), a literary work about a corrupt official in the northern Chinese province of Heilongjiang named Wang Shouxin, created a sensation when it was published in 1979, and became a central element in the effort in China to reflect on and understand the course of Chinese social development, particularly over the course of the Cultural Revolution.

People or Monsters was widely read in China, and was broadly re-distributed following initial publication. "What was powerful about Liu's piece was it universality: everyone in China knew people like Wang Shouxin, and it made everyone think of all those who had not been brought to justice."

People or Monsters was the first in a series of works describing corruption and social problems, and was noteworthy for its use of fact-based reporting (reportage) in place of pure fiction.

In the 1980s, he was one of China's most celebrated writers. "Di'erzhong Zhongcheng" (《第二种忠诚》) [A Second Kind of Loyalty] (1985) and other essays made him a household name among Chinese readers and cemented his reputation as "China's conscience." In 1985, when the Chinese Writers' Association was allowed (for the first and last time) to elect its own leaders, Liu Binyan received the second-highest number of votes to Ba Jin, the surviving May-Fourth era writer.

== Liu in the United States ==
In December 1986, college students demonstrated in over a dozen Chinese cities in order to demand greater economic and political freedoms (1986 Demonstrations). Deng Xiaoping, after two straight weeks of student demonstrations, believed that the student movement was a result of "bourgeois liberalization", and named three CCP members to be expelled, including Fang Lizhi, Liu Binyan, and Wang Ruowang. Deng directed then-CCP General Secretary Hu Yaobang to expel them from the CCP, but Hu refused. Because of his refusal, Hu was dismissed from his position as General Secretary, effectively ending his period of influence within the Chinese government.

Liu Binyan was again expelled from the CCP in 1987, as part of Deng Xiaoping's crackdown on "bourgeois liberalism". In spring of 1988 he came to the United States for teaching and writing; then, after publicly denouncing the Chinese government for the 1989 Tiananmen Square protests and massacre, he was barred from returning to China and never saw his homeland again. Although largely isolated from his Chinese readers, he continued to write about China where his sources often came from interviewing visitors from China.

He published articles critical of Chinese corruption for the Hong Kong media, and offered commentary for the U.S. government funded Radio Free Asia (nonetheless, he was reported to "detest American capitalism" and expressed dismay at a certain Chinese dissident's support for the Iraq war). Until the end, he remained an adherent of socialism with a human face, was critical of social inequality and consumerist cynicism in China, and stressed that the CCP, which he had joined as a youth, had many positive achievements before the Maoist crimes and its transformation into the "foul, reactionary force" that it was today.

He died in East Windsor, New Jersey in December 2005, from complications due to colon cancer. He was survived by his wife, Zhu Hong.

== See also ==
- Wang Shouxin
- Human rights in China
- Anti-Rightist Movement
- Cultural Revolution
- Tiananmen Square protests of 1989
- Fang Lizhi
- Wang Ruowang
- Sayaka Morohoshi
- Communism in China
