= Democracy Party of China =

Democracy Party of China 中国民主党
- Founded: June 28, 1998
- Ideology: Liberal democracy Liberalism (Chinese)

Party flag

Website
- https://cdpuk.co.uk

The China Democracy Party (CDP; simplified Chinese: 中国民主党; traditional Chinese: 中國民主黨; pinyin: Zhōngguó Mínzhǔ Dǎng), also known as the Democracy Party of China (DPC), is a political party that started in the People's Republic of China, and was banned by the Chinese Communist Party (CCP). The history of the DPC and its foundation date is unclear because it has many historical paths under different groups of founders. According to western sources, it is generally recognized to have assembled in 1998 by democracy activists and former student leaders from the 1989 Tiananmen Square protests.

== History ==
=== Foundation ===
While the earliest date listed for its founding is 25 June 1998, the group registered the party on 28 June when US President Bill Clinton was visiting China. Wang Youcai, one of the main activists during the 1989 Tiananmen protest along with Wang Donghai and Lin Hui went to the Civil Public Affair Hall of Hangzhou in Zhejiang Province to officially register the party. Their registration was declined. The fourth co-founder was Chen Shuqing.

=== Communist Party response ===
The next day on 25 June, Wang was arrested by the state police at his home. He was charged with creating opposition against the Chinese government. His trial began on 18 December, and as he had no lawyer defence, his trial lasted only a few hours. He was quickly sentenced on 21 December to 11 years of imprisonment and three years of deprivation of political rights for subversion. He was released from prison and exiled in 2004 under international political pressure, especially from the United States.

On the same day, Xu Wenli, a 55-year-old member was also sentenced to 13 years for "seeking to overthrow" the CCP. On 24 December 2002, Xu was exiled to America on grounds of medical parole.

On 22 December, Qin Yongmin was sentenced to 12 years in prison for harming state security.

Li Peng, Chairman of the Standing Committee of the National People's Congress at the time proclaimed, "If a group is designed to negate the leadership of the Communist Party, then it will not be allowed to exist."

The CCP declared the CDP an illegal organization, followed by a crackdown in Beijing in 1998. After the sentencing on 23 December, the Supreme People's Court then declared that, "anyone who knowingly publishes, prints, copies, or distributes material containing incitement to overthrow state power and the socialist system or split the country" could be tried for crimes. Such charges could result in life sentences for film directors, computer software developers, writers and artists, and media and publishing personnel, all of whom are subject to the directive.

=== Crackdown on other members ===
There were hundreds of CDP members who were detained, arrested, and sentenced to prison. Among them:

- Chen Shuqing
- Gao Hongmin
- Liu Shizhun
- Liu Xianbin
- Mao Qinxiang
- She Wanbao
- Wu Yilong
- Xie Wanjun
- Zha Jianguo
- Zhu Yufu
- Zhu Zhengming

The above are some of the members of the party. Internet dissident He Depu was also arrested and detained in a correctional facility.

=== Present ===
Later Xu Wenli and Wang Youcai were exiled to the US on 24 December 2002 and 4 March 2004. In August 2006, the first congress of the CDP was convened in New York. Ni Yu Xian, the leader of China's democracy movement, one of the founders of DPC and the China Freedom & Democracy Party, presided over the congress. A total of 111 delegates from all the provinces, municipalities and autonomous regions of China attended the Congress. The congress passed the Statutes of Democracy Party of China, Party Program, and some important resolutions.

The Coordinative Service Platform was founded by the members of the CDP who are in China, overseas students, and exiled Democracy Party of China members. The initiative group members were Wang Youcai, Lin Hui, Chen Shuqing, Chen Zhiwei, Gao Yeju, Lv Gengsong, Xu Guang, Shan Chenfeng, along with many other members.

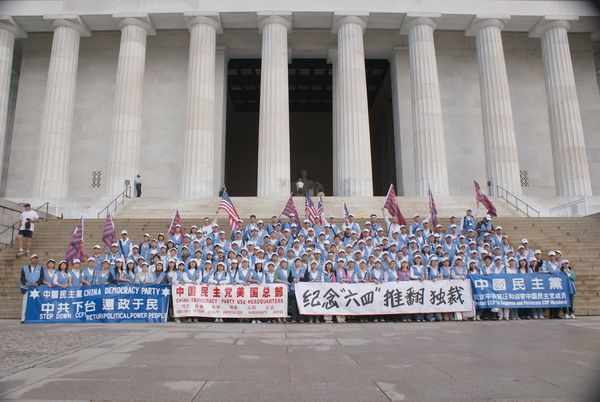
Democracy Party of China (2012)

In January 2008, party member Zheng Cunzhu established the Local Committee of the CDP. Zheng Cunzhu is a former student leader during 1989's pre-democratic movements in Anhui province, and he published an open letter to the leaders of China to advocate the restarting of political reform.

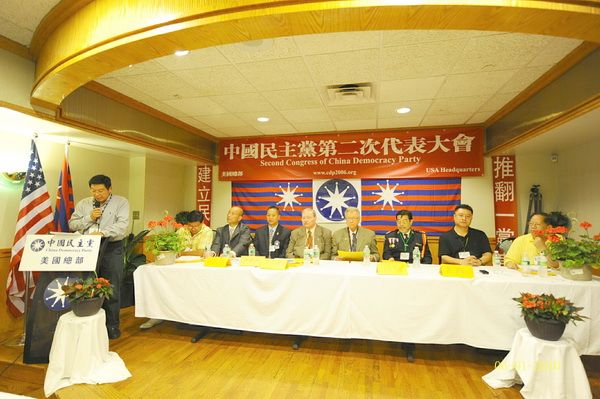
Democracy Party of China (2012)

The UK Headquarters of the CDP was officially established on November 24, 2021. The predecessor of the UK Headquarters of China Democratic Party was known as the "China Democratic Party UK Branch."

== Party summary ==
The CDP suggests the ideas of "Prosperity, Fairness, Democracy" (富裕 公平 民主) and "Freedom, Rule-of-Law, Human rights" (自由 法制 人权/人權). The CDP has four features:

- The Chinese Democracy Party was founded in mainland China.
- The Democracy Party of China applied to register in Hangzhou in 1998.
- The Chinese Democracy Party was founded by participants of the 1978 Chinese Democracy Wall Movement, the 1989 Democracy Movement, and various democracy movements from abroad.
- Since the first day of its founding, the Chinese Democracy Party has been receiving close attention and intervention from the government of the United States and other nations. Specifically in 1999 under the leadership of Wang Xizhe, the United Nations Commission on Human Rights nominated CDP members Xu Wenli, Qin Yongmin and Wang Youcai for the Nobel Peace Prize.

== See also ==
- List of political parties in the People's Republic of China
- List of pro-democracy protests in China
