= 2011 crackdown on dissidents in China =

Arrests of dissidents of mainland Chinese people's rights

The 2011 crackdown on dissidents in China refers to the arrest of dozens of mainland Chinese rights lawyers, activists and grassroots agitators in a response to the 2011 Chinese pro-democracy protests. Since the start of the protests in mid-February 2011, at least 54 Chinese activists were arrested or detained by authorities in the biggest crackdown on dissent since the 1989 Tiananmen Square protests and massacre. Human rights groups claimed that some of them were charged with crimes. Among those arrested were bloggers who criticise the government such as Ai Weiwei, lawyers who pursue cases against the government, and human rights activists.

== Arrests ==
At least 54 leading activists were arrested or detained by authorities including:

1. Ai Weiwei (Chinese: 艾未未), prominent dissident, had expressed his sympathy with the 2011 Chinese pro-democracy protests: Amid Boxun's online campaign, Ai had posted on his Twitter account on 24 February: "I didn’t care about jasmine at first, but people who are scared by jasmine sent out information about how harmful jasmine is often, which makes me realize that jasmine is what scares them the most. What a jasmine!" Ai's studio was raided by police, who took away computer equipment; a number of his entourage were also arrested by police. He was arrested on 3 April. The Chinese Ministry of Foreign Affairs said on 7 April that Ai was under investigation for 'economic crimes'. On 20 April Ai was appointed visiting professor of the University of the Arts in Berlin.
2. Chen Wei (陈卫), 42, a leading human rights activist in central Sichuan province, on the morning of 20 February was charged with "subversion of state power" and "inciting subversion of state power". Chen Wei was sentenced in late December to nine years in prison.
3. Chen Xi, 57, (no relation to Chen Wei) was sentenced in late December to ten years in prison in Guiyang, Guizhou, on charges linked essays he published online and after he campaigned for independent candidates to win seats in elections to the local People's Congress.
4. Cheng Li (成力), performing artist.
5. Ding Mao (丁矛), an activist, was arrested between 25 and 28 March.
6. Dong Jiqing, husband of housing rights lawyer Ni Yulan
7. Gu Chuan, critical writer;
8. Guo Gai (郭盖), performing artist;
9. Guo Weidong (郭卫东), a businessman and blogger, was charged with "inciting subversion".
10. Hu Mingfeng, accountant of Ai Weiwei;
11. Hua Chunhui (华春辉), sent to Re-education through Labor;
12. Huang Xiang (黄香), performing artist;
13. Jiang Tianyong (江天勇), a human rights activist and lawyer, was detained by police on 19 February 2011, when he was grabbed and thrown into a waiting van. On 20 February, police in Beijing went to the home of Jiang Tianyong's brother, where Jiang was temporarily staying, and confiscated his laptop computer. On 21 February they returned and searched Jiang's room, confiscating a desktop computer and other items. Jiang was released on 19 April 2011. Jiang earlier was tortured in prison.
14. Jiao Guobiao, a crusader activist against the Central Propaganda Department, was detained on 12 September 2012 in Beijing during the run-up to the 18th National Congress of the Chinese Communist Party.
15. Jin Mingri, senior pastor of the free church called Zion Church in Beijing was shortly detained to be prevented from attending Lausanne Conference in South Africa. He is a graduate of Beijing University, Nanjing Seminary, and Fuller Theological Seminary.
16. Jin Tianming, senior pastor of the free church called Shouwang Church in Beijing was shortly detained and later released into house arrest.
17. Lan Jingyuan (兰靖远), arrested and released on bail to await trial;
18. Li Hai (李海), critical writer;
19. Li Hong, sentenced to six years in prison
20. Li Shuangde (李双德), is a citizen lawyer and an activist based in Chengdu. He operates a legal aid center in Chengdu, and provides legal aid to citizens who cannot afford to hire a lawyer. He has been harassed on numerous occasions in the past by local officials. He was detained in March 2011, and sentenced in June 2011 to four months in jail on charges of credit card fraud. He was released on 22 July 2011.
21. Li Tiantian, human rights lawyer;
22. Li Tie, writer, sentenced to ten years in prison for subversion of state power, also alleged to be a member of the China Social Democracy Party;
23. Li Xianbin, sentenced to ten years in prison
24. Liang Haiyi, from Harbin, was arrested after posting information on the 2011 protests on a chat room.
25. Liu Huiping (刘慧萍), human rights activist;
26. Liu Shihui, human rights lawyer;
27. Liu Xianbin on 25 March was sentenced to 10 years in prison for "slandering the Communist Party" and subversion.
28. Liu Xiaoyuan, an activist lawyer, on 15 April was taken away by officers who identified themselves as being from Beijing's public security bureau. They questioned him about cases he had worked on before and which had to do with his friend Ai Weiwei. Ai had asked Liu to represent him in case he would be taken away. He was released in the evening of 19 April.
29. Liu Zhengang, works for design and architecture company of Ai Weiwei's wife;
30. Liu Zhengqing, critical writer;
31. Ma Liangfu, from Inner Mongolia, was sentenced to re-education through labor in 2012.
32. Mao Hengfeng from Shanghai, who campaigned against a strict one-child policy was taken from her home to a labor camp.
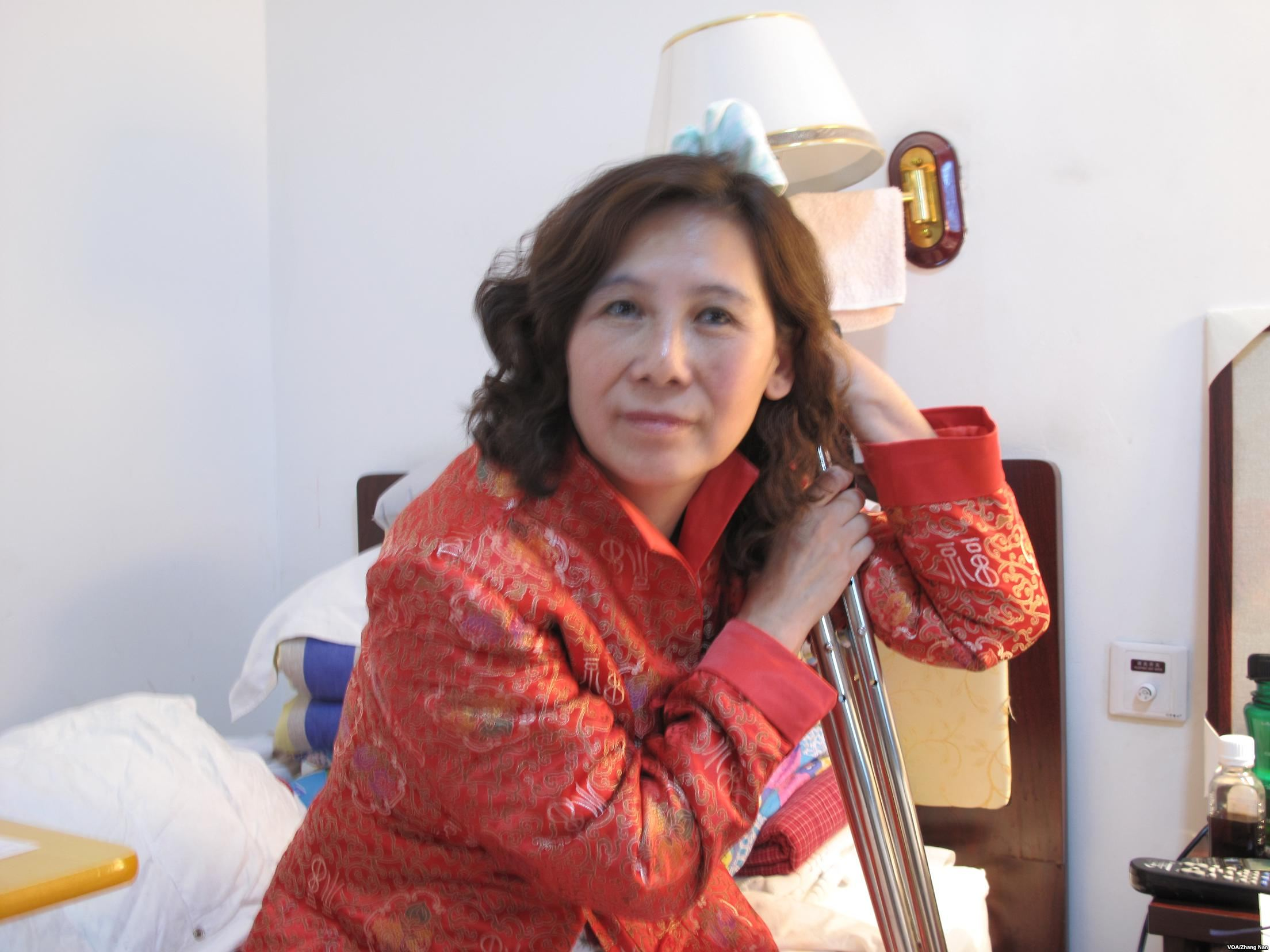
  Ni Yulan, in prison tortured and forced into a wheelchair, left homeless and arrested again in April 2011
33. Ni Yulan (倪玉兰), a critical lawyer working for victims of land eviction cases, was arrested together with her husband. Only a year prior, she had been released from an earlier detention of two years. Due to torture in prison, she needed a wheelchair. After her release a year ago, she had to live in a tent, since she was a victim of land eviction herself.
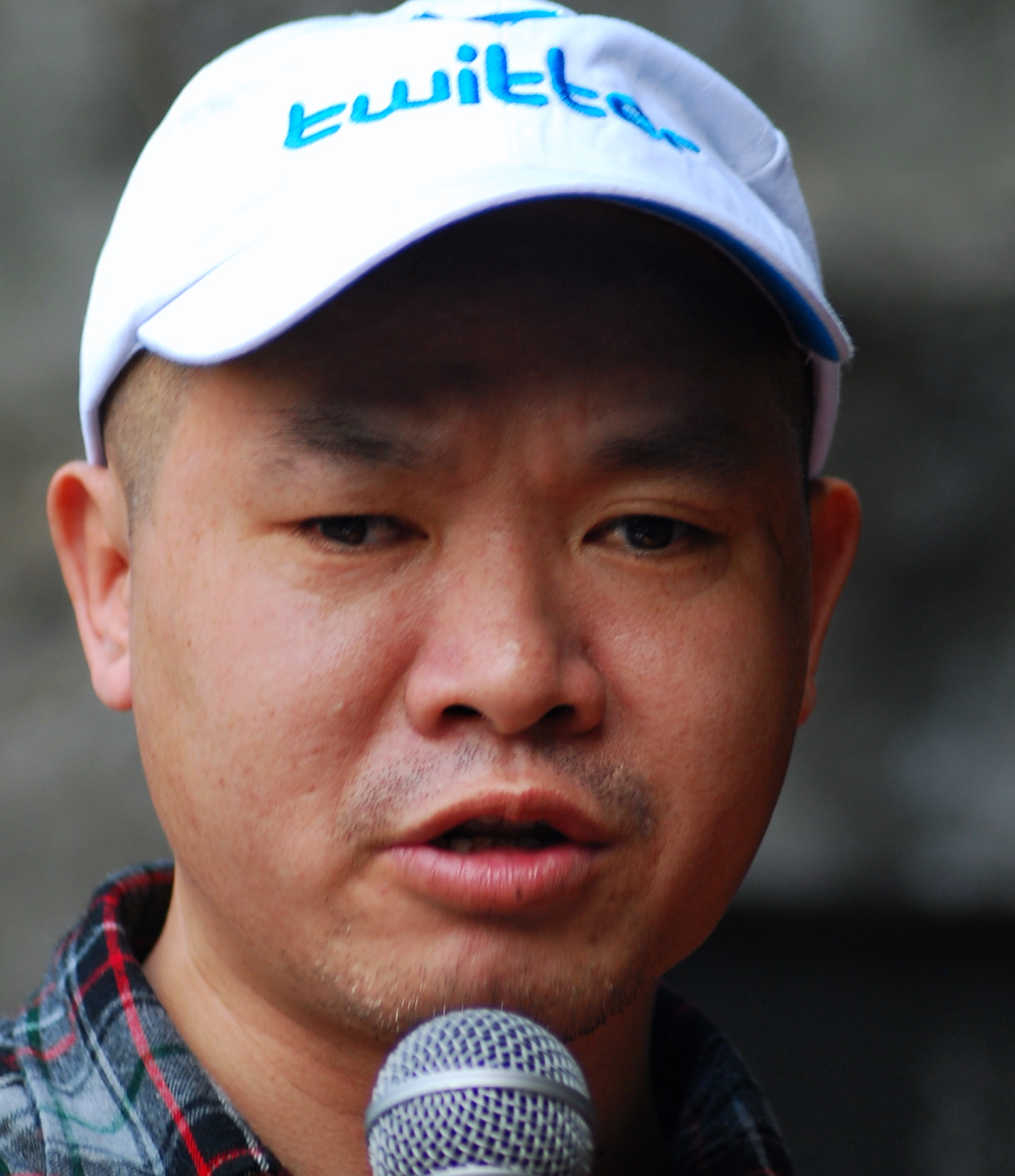
  Blogger Ran Yunfei charged with inciting subversion of state power
34. Quan Lianzhao (全连昭), activist;
35. Ran Yunfei (冉云飞), a former leader of the student movement 1989, who has served years in prison, today a well-known blogger and writer from Sichuan, was arrested on charges of "inciting subversion of state power".
36. Sun Desheng (孙德胜), activist;
37. Tang Jingling (唐荆陵), Guangzhou-based human rights lawyer.
38. Tang Jitian, human rights lawyer;
39. Teng Biao (滕彪), of the Open Constitution Initiative, was reported missing / incommunicado.
40. Wei Qiang (魏强) a former art student who has worked at Ai Weiwei's studio, has been sentenced to two years of re-education through labour for attending a pro-democracy protest.
41. Wen Tao, journalist of Global Times, friend of Ai Weiwei;
42. Wu Lebao (吴乐宝), Chinese dissident, friend of Ai Weiwei. Wu was close to Ai before the Chinese Jasmine Revolution happened, and was suspected of leading Chinese Jasmine Revolution with Ai Weiwei. Wu was interrogated and detained over three months;
43. Yang Qiuyu (杨秋雨), campaigner for the rights of petitioners, took pictures of a site mentioned in connection with the 'Jasmine Revolution', was seized by police at Xidan in Beijing and without trial was sent to a Labour Camp.
44. Ye Du, a critical writer, was arrested;
45. Yu Yunfeng, from Harbin, was sentenced to re-education through labor.
46. Zhang Jinsong, cousin and driver of Ai Weiei;
47. Zhu Yufu (朱虞夫), a longtime activist and a founder of the China Democracy Party, was arrested and accused of "inciting subversion of state power."
48. Zhui Hun (追魂), performing artist.

Renee Xia, the international director of Chinese Human Rights Defenders, commented on 26 February 2011: "The numbers point to a bad situation that is only getting worse. In the matter of a few days, we have seen more cases of prominent lawyers subjected to prolonged disappearances, more criminal charges that may carry lengthy prison sentences for activists, more home raids, and a heavier reliance on extralegal measures."; In addition, according to Phelim Kine of Human Rights Watch, three people, Lan Ruoyu, Tan Yanhua, and Zhang Haibo, are believed to be still missing by September 2011. A total of about 17 people from the above list remain in detention, prison, or re-education through labor. An unknown number of people remain held in house detention.

== Supervision and summoning ==
- Up to 200 people are subject to reinforced supervision or house arrest.
- Since mid February, more than a hundred people have been summoned or questioned by police.
- On the morning of 19 February, National Security officers in Yichang City, Hubei Province arrived at the home of activist Shi Yulin 石玉林, summoning him for questioning. While Shi was being interrogated, officers searched his home, confiscating a computer. Shi recently had taken efforts to support Shandong human rights defender Chen Guangcheng 陈关诚.

== Commentary ==
- The UN Working Group on Enforced or Involuntary Disappearances expressed "serious concern at the recent wave of enforced disappearances".
- According to Amnesty International more than 100 activists, lawyers and writers have been detained or have simply disappeared—some of them just for using the words "Jasmine Revolution" in a Twitter feed.
- According to Chinese Human Rights Defenders, "this is the harshest crackdown [...] in the past 15 years. Every day, someone is disappeared, taken away, detained or charged."

== See also ==
- 709 crackdown, a crackdown on lawyers and human rights activists in 2015
- Weiquan movement
- Human rights in China
- List of Chinese dissidents
