= Ian Johnson (writer) =

American journalist (born 1962)

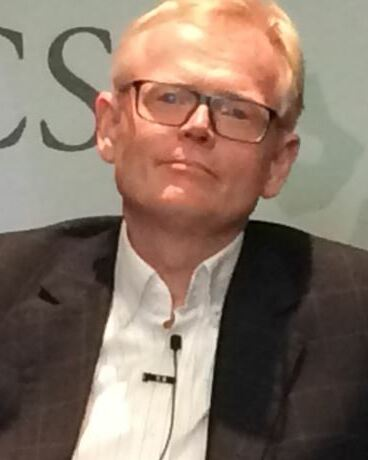
- Born: 27 July 1962 (age 64); Montreal, Quebec, Canada
- Education: University of Florida, Free University of Berlin
- Occupation: Journalist
- Website: www.ian-johnson.com

Ian Johnson (born July 27, 1962) is a Canadian-born American journalist known for his long-time reporting and a series of books on China and Germany. His Chinese name is Zhang Yan (張彦). Johnson writes regularly for The New York Review of Books and The New York Times, and The Wall Street Journal.

Johnson won the 2001 Pulitzer Prize for his coverage in the Wall Street Journal of the persecution of Falun Gong practitioners in China. His reporting from China was also honored in 2001 by the Overseas Press Club and the Society of Professional Journalists. In 2017 he won Stanford University's Shorenstein Prize for his body of work covering Asia. In 2019 he won the American Academy of Religion's "best in-depth newswriting" award.

In 2020, Johnson's journalist visa was canceled amid Sino-American tensions over bilateral trade and the COVID-19 epidemic, and he left China. He currently lives in New York City, where he is Stephen A. Schwarzman senior fellow for China studies at the Council on Foreign Relations.

== Early life and education ==
Born in Montreal, Quebec, Canada, Johnson is a naturalized United States citizen who lived in Beijing for over twenty years. He attended Chamberlain High School in Tampa, Florida. He studied Asian studies and journalism at the University of Florida, where he . He first visited China as a student in 1984 and later studied Chinese in Taiwan. He obtained a MA in Sinology from the Free University of Berlin. He is currently pursuing a PhD focused on Chinese religious associations at Leipzig University.

== Career ==
From 1994 to 1997, Johnson worked in Beijing for The Baltimore Sun and from 1997 to 2001 for The Wall Street Journal. After working in Berlin, Germany for nearly eight years he returned to China in 2009.

In 2004, Johnson published Wild Grass: Three Stories of Change in Modern China (Pantheon) on grassroots efforts to form civil society. It was later released in paperback and has been translated into several languages.

On February 9, 2006, Johnson delivered congressional testimony on the Muslim Brotherhood in Europe. He described the Brotherhood as "an umbrella group that regularly lobbies major international institutions like the EU and the Vatican" and "controls some of the most dynamic, politically active Muslim groups in key European countries, such as Britain, France and Germany." He said the group has schools "to train imams," has funded a "mechanism in the guise of a UK-registered charity," and has a fatwa council to enforce ideological conformity.

Johnson left the Wall Street Journal in 2010 to pursue magazine and book writing on cultural and social affairs. In 2010, Johnson published A Mosque in Munich, a book about the rise of the Muslim Brotherhood in Europe. He conducted research on the book while on a Nieman fellowship at Harvard University.

In 2017, he published The Souls of China: The Return of Religion After Mao about China's search for meaning and values. It included a 100-page profile of Early Rain Reformed Church in Chengdu and its pastor Wang Yi who was arrested in 2018 for incitement to subvert state power. It also included one of the last in-depth interviews with the popular Chinese spiritual leader Nan Huai-Chin as well as research on General Secretary of the Chinese Communist Party Xi Jinping's support for traditional religions, especially Buddhism, when he was head of Zhengding County in the 1980s. The Souls of China was voted one of the best books of the year by The Economist and The Christian Science Monitor.

He has published chapters in three other books: The Oxford Illustrated History of Modern China, Chinese Characters, and My First Trip to China.

His book Sparks: China's Underground Historians was published in September 2023, and follows various "counter-historians" and dissident figures from China's past and present, including whistleblowers of the COVID-19 pandemic in Wuhan.

In April 2022 he re-entered China for a visit, describing it in a Foreign Affairs article as having entered an "age of stagnation."

== Bibliography ==
=== Books ===
- Johnson, Ian (2004). Wild grass : three stories of change in modern China. New York: Pantheon Books.
- — (2010). A mosque in Munich : Nazis, the CIA, and the Muslim Brotherhood in the West. Boston: Houghton Mifflin Harcourt.
- — (2017). The Souls of China: The Return of Religion after Mao. New York: Pantheon Books. ISBN 9781101870051.
- — (2023). Sparks: China's Underground Historians and their Battle for the Future. New York: Oxford University Press. ISBN 9780197575505.

=== Essays and reporting ===
- Ex-Colony Weihai Ponders What Might Have Been, Wall Street Journal, June 24, 1997
- Can't We All Just Get Along? Are European Muslims Islam's best hope?, Wall Street Journal, September 16, 2004
- In China, Grass-Roots Groups Stretch Limits on Activism, Wall Street Journal, January 9, 2008
- "Will the Chinese be supreme?", New York Review of Books, 04.04.2013 Will the Chinese Be Supreme?
- Johnson, Ian (April 22, 2013). "Studio city : in a remote spot in China, the world's biggest movie lot is getting even bigger". Onward and Upward with the Arts. The New Yorker. Vol. 89, no. 10. pp. 48–55. Profile of Hengdian World Studios.
- — (December 2, 2013). "In the air : discontent grows in Chinas most polluted cities". Letter from Handan. The New Yorker. Vol. 89, no. 39. pp. 32–37.
- — (February 3, 2014). "Class consciousness : China's new bourgeoisie discovers alternative education". Letter from Chengdu. The New Yorker. Vol. 89, no. 47. pp. 34–39.
- Ian Johnson, "What Holds China Together?", The New York Review of Books, vol. LXVI, no. 14 (26 September 2019).
- A Professor Who Challenges the Washington Consensus on China, The New Yorker, December 13, 2022.
- Xi's Age of Stagnation, Foreign Affairs, August 22, 2023
