= Xia Junfeng =

Chinese food seller convicted of murder

Xia Junfeng was a street food seller in China who was convicted of murder in 2009 and executed in 2013.

== Trial and execution ==
Junfeng's death sentence was carried out, despite two appeals, after he was convicted of murdering two officials who were trying to stop him from trading.

Xia claimed he stabbed the two officials in self-defense after they beat him. The court ruled there was no evidence of self-defense and convicted him of murder. A higher court upheld the lower court's ruling.

A group of 25 human rights lawyers objected, citing uncertainty in the case, and asserting that the Chinese Supreme Court should have intervened. Xia's case was contrasted with that of Gu Kailai, the wife of politician Bo Xilai, who had been imprisoned for corruption. The lawyers issued a joint statement condemning what they said was an unjust execution. The statement was signed by prominent lawyers including Li Fangping, Teng Biao and Jiang Tianyong.

The Supreme Court had promised to carry out a comprehensive review of Xia's case, but there had been no word from the judiciary for 28 months, raising supporters' hopes that Xia's death sentence would be commuted. Xia was executed by lethal injection. He was 37-years-old. His wife and mother-in-law were only given 30 minutes notice of the execution so they could briefly visit him.

== Public response ==
Xia 's execution prompted an outcry on China's social media sites, and quickly became the most discussed topic on Sina Weibo, China's equivalent of Twitter. Social media users noted how the well-connected Gu was spared her life; while a lowly street vender was put to death. Tong Zongjin, a professor at the China University of Political Science and Law in Beijing said: "If Gu Kailai can remain alive after poisoning someone to death then Xia Junfeng shouldn't be put to death...It might be a flimsy dream to insist that everyone be treated equally before the law, but it's nonetheless unseemly to turn this ideal into a joke."

There was sympathetic coverage even from pro-government news media. Global Times, a Chinese Communist Party tabloid, portrayed the case as a tragedy. While the official Xinhua news agency ran a series of paintings by Xia's young son – including one depicting a child running to embrace his father. A book of the son's paintings, published to raise funds, sold out its entire 5,000-copy print run.

Initiatives for China, founded by US-based activist Yang Jianli, urged Xia's supporters to protest on the traditional seventh day when Chinese commemorate the passing of loved ones.

In Guangzhou, activists Xiao Qingshan, Zhang Shengyu and Ma Shengfen displayed a poster outside the Justice Department reading: "The violent urban management officers deserved to die – Xia Junfeng did not."

== Views and commentary ==
Teng Biao, a lawyer who represented Mr. Xia, suggested the sentence was intended to send the message that any challenges to the government would not be tolerated. "The authorities wanted to show off their muscle," he said. Teng said the court refused testimony from six witnesses making it clear that Mr. Xia had acted in self-defense – with the judge relying on testimony from the chengguan, who are low-level officials. The impunity of the chengguan has become notorious across the nation. Teng noted that a conviction of intentional homicide requires proof of a premeditated crime – and that was an example of "extreme unfairness under the law".

Andrew Jacobs, of The New York Times pointed out the similarities between Xia's case and that of Cui Yingjie, a unlicensed sausage vendor in Beijing, convicted in 2007 of slashing to death an enforcement official who had seized his cart. Cui, however, had been given a suspended death sentence.
