= Ran Yunfei =

Chinese writer, pro-democracy activist, and journalist

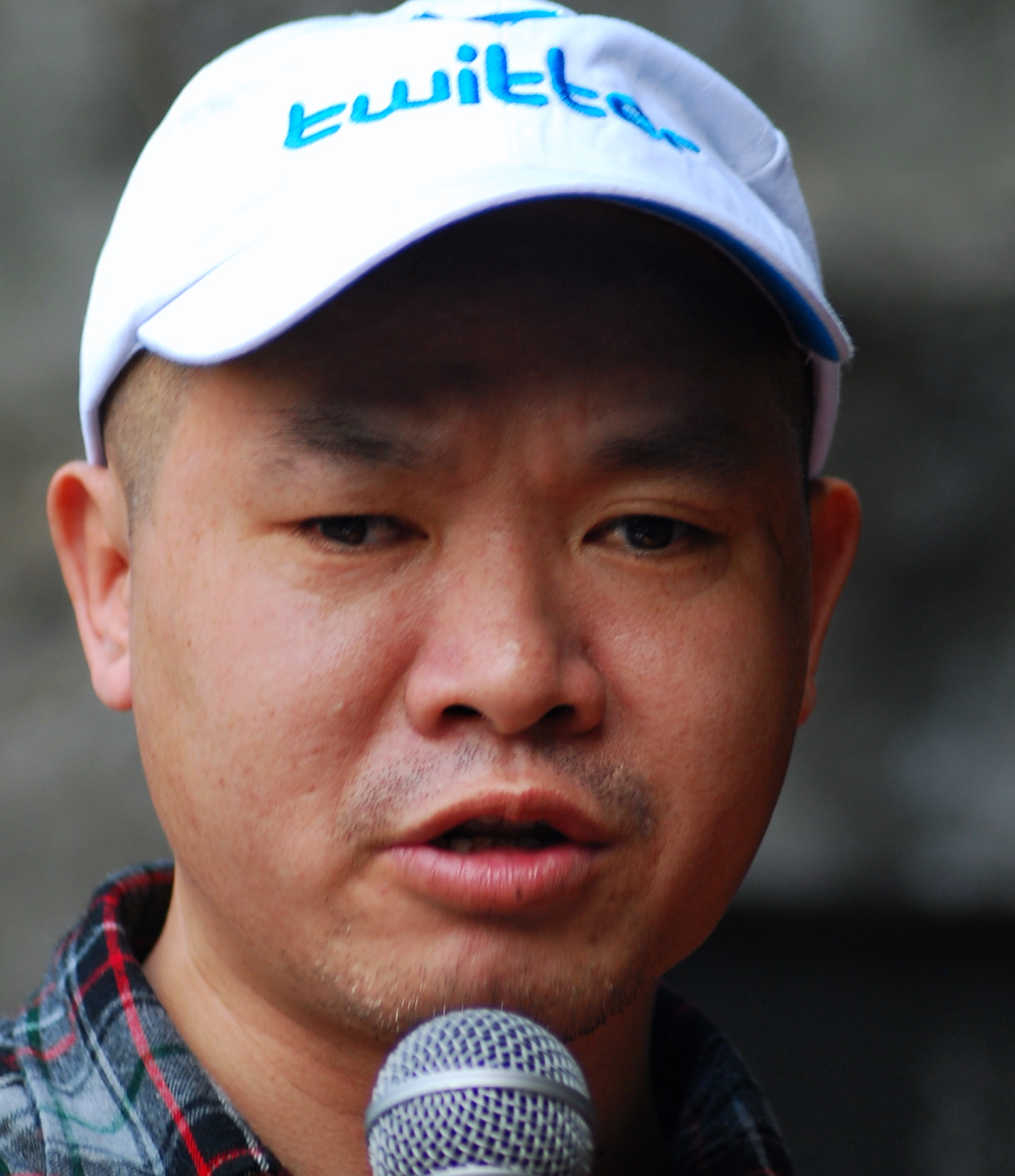
- Yunfei in 2009
- Traditional Chinese: 冉雲飛
- Simplified Chinese: 冉云飞
Transcriptions
Standard Mandarin
- Hanyu Pinyin: Rǎn Yúnfēi

Ran Yunfei (born 1965) is a Chinese writer and a high-profile democracy activist and blogger. He was arrested in late March 2011, shortly after the start of the 2011 Chinese pro-democracy protests, on charges of "inciting subversion of state power". He was released in August 2011 and remains under residential surveillance. Ran expressed through social media that he converted to Christianity on 31 October 2015. He was baptized by Pastor Wang Yi at Early Rain Covenant Church, and has been attending a Bible study since 2013.

== Biography ==
Ran is a member of the ethnic Tujia minority and was born in Youyang County, Chongqing. After graduating from Sichuan University, where he studied Chinese literature, in 1987, he was engaged in supporting the students who participated in the Tiananmen Square Protests. Because of the sweeping crackdown from the authorities, he went to Ngawa Tibetan Prefecture for a time. He works for the magazine Sichuan Literature and is a resident of Chengdu, Sichuan Province.

Although he became a scholarly writer of Chinese classical culture hereafter, he was increasingly active in online writing. He is a prolific writer of social and political commentary. His blog is well known in China and his Twitter account has more than 44,000 followers. Ran was also among those who signed Charter 08.

== Arrest ==
In the backdrop of the 2011 Chinese pro-democracy protests, Ran was summoned to "tea" by public security on the morning of 20 February 2011 and detained. Officers later searched his home and confiscated his computer. On 24 February 2011, he was officially detained for "subversion of state power", according to a formal detention notice received by his wife. On 25 or 28 March 2011, he was formally arrested for "inciting subversion of state power" in China. He was released from arrest on 10 August 2011, and placed under residential surveillance.
