= Gu Yi =

Chinese student dissident and human rights activist

- 古懿
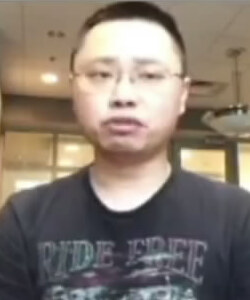
- Gu in 2015
- Born: Luzhou, Sichuan, China
- Other name: Sulaiman Gu
- Education: University of Georgia
- Occupation: Student activist
- Years active: 2012–present
- Known for: On the 26th Anniversary of Tian’anmen Massacre – an Open Letter to Fellow Students in Mainland China

Gu Yi (Chinese: 古懿), also known as Sulaiman Gu, is a Chinese student dissident and human rights activist. He was interrogated and reprimanded for discussing with Ilham Tohti and other Uyghur dissidents and criticizing China's unfair treatment of its minority citizens in Xinjiang in 2009. Later he went abroad to study Chemistry as a graduate student of Chemistry in the University of Georgia continuing his political activism in terms of writings and demonstrations. He was an enthusiastic supporter of 2014 Hong Kong protests. In May 2015, he became widely-known for authoring and organizing an open letter to fellow students in China on the 26th anniversary of the Tiananmen Square massacre.

== Early life in China ==
Gu was born in People's Republic of China. Later in July 2015, as a student of University of Science and Technology of China, he was involved in online discussion with Uighur activists on websites like UighurOnline, where he openly condemned China's forced assimilation policies and violation of religious freedom in Xinjiang, which resulted in him being questioned and reprimanded by the Chinese government for accusation of inciting subversion of state power.

He was ultimately pardoned and allowed to travel to the United States to continue his education.

== Political involvements in United States ==
In May 2015, Gu, as a Chinese oversea student in University of Georgia, involved in the commemoration event for the 25th anniversary of the 1989 Tiananmen Square protests and massacre organised by Independent Federation of Chinese Students and Scholars in front of Embassy of China in Washington, D.C.

In September 2014, Gu published an Article titled "Ilham's Sentence is Depressing" on The New York Times Chinese website, recalling his experience with Ilham Tohti, and rebuke the arrest and sentence of Ilham Tohti conducted by Chinese government.

In October 2014, Gu involved in demonstrations supporting 2014 Hong Kong protests in Washington, D.C. In the interview of Voice of America and several other media, he said that his value is to fight for freedom and fight against oppression, and he hoped everyone could live without threaten.

Since 2015, Gu published several articles on websites such as Boxun, rebuking the oppression to minorities, dissidents and activists conducted by Chinese Government. He believed the political system in People's Republic of China is like ISIS.

In May 2015, Gu initiated an open letter titled "On the 26th Anniversary of Tian’anmen Massacre – an Open Letter to Fellow Students in Mainland China", urging revealing the truth of 1989 Tiananmen Square protests and massacre. In the open letter, he expressed that Chinese Communist Party (CCP) authorities were not qualified to "redress" the victims of Tiananmen Square massacre, and "the state criminals must be sentenced". He further called for students in China to acknowledge the evil history of the CCP since 1921, and to think about the fundamental causes of the suffers by Chinese nations. His open letter was signed by numerous oversea Chinese students such as Wu Lebao in Australia and Chen Bingxu in Michigan State University in United States. After the open letter was published, on 26 May, Global Times, a tabloid of the CCP, published an article titled "Oversea Forces are trying to incite young generations (to against Chinese Government)" criticising Gu's open letter. However, the article was soon recalled by itself. That attracted more attentions and signatories to the open letter.

In May 2016, Gu hosted an event in China in Perspective, a magazine affiliated with Princeton China Initiative, calling for essays about comments on Tiananmen Square massacre from new generations in China. The event got about 30 submissions.

On 24 July 2015, Gu and Rose Tang initiated an open letter to International Olympic Committee against the bid of Beijing for the 2022 Winter Olympics. In the letter, he expressed "the pure Olympic dream should never serve political oppression by a host government", and "under this government, any more Olympic games would go down in history as the Shame Games”, and appealed International Olympic Committee vote to deny the bid of Beijing. The letter was supported by numerous Chinese dissidents and activists, such as Tony Chang, Chen Guangcheng, Fang Zheng, Hu Jia, Teng Biao and Wu Lebao. However, Hong Lei, the spokesperson for the Ministry of Foreign Affairs of the People's Republic of China claimed it was "with ulterior motives" and "will not enjoy popular support" in respond to the letter.

On 25 January 2016, Gu initiated an event supporting Zhang Haitao, a political prisoner who was just sentenced 19 years imprisonment for "inciting subversion of state power" and "illegally providing state secrets overseas". He stated that himself was persecuted because of against the colonialism in Xinjiang conducted by Chinese Government, which was in the similar situation as Zhang Haitao.

On 28 April 2016, Gu was invited by Voice of America to analyse the incident of Wu Wei. He believed that the protests by Chinese oversea student in The University of Sydney had "Chinese official backgrounds", and argued that the so-called "little pinks" (Chinese patriots) were the actual racist. He was also against the statement of "independence of Taiwan", as he believed that was actually the rebellion conducted by the CCP.

On 30 September 2016, Kwon Pyong, a graduated student from Iowa State University was arrested by Chinese police in Yanji for planning wearing a T-shirt to protest against Xi Jinping, who is the General Secretary of the Chinese Communist Party. After that, on 8 December, Gu, Tony Chang and Yi Songnan initiated an open letter to General Secretary Xi Jinping, urging Xi "stop the ongoing fascist persecution, release Kwon Pyong and all the other kidnapped citizens", challenging him "who will drive your tanks to crush us, the new generation of students after 1989", and warning him "not draw for yourself a despot's future". The letter got signed by 54 Chinese oversea students. The letter was later spread among several Chinese forums and Weibo, and Chinese Muslim Forum was shut down by Chinese government because of spreading the letter. Gu believed that Chinese Government was trying to stop the spreading of the letter, as well as persecute Muslims in China. He further claimed that he did not admit the legitimacy of the CCP, and hoped peaceful protests to end the CCP in China, and did not interested to "contribute to China".
