= Chen Wei (dissident) =

Chinese dissident and human rights activist

- Born: February 21, 1969 (age 57); Suining, Sichuan, People's Republic of China
- Education: Beijing Institute of Technology
- Known for: democracy and human rights activism

Chen Wei (Chinese: 陈卫; pinyin: Chén Wèi; born 21 February 1969) is a Chinese dissident and human rights activist. In December 2011, he was sentenced to nine years in prison for inciting subversion.

== Biography ==
Chen was born 21 February 1969 in Suining, Sichuan. Chen was one of the student leaders of the 1989 Tiananmen Square Protests, when he was a mechanical engineering student at the Beijing Institute of Technology. He was imprisoned in Qincheng prison and released in January 1991.

In May 1992, Chen was arrested again for commemorating the Tiananmen Square Protests and organizing a political party, and was sentenced to five years in prison.

Chen was a signatory of Charter 08, a manifesto demanding the right of free association and the end to one-party rule.

== 2011 arrest ==
On the morning of 20 February 2011 Chen followed a police invitation for tea but did not return. The Suining City Public Security Bureau released a document on the evening of 21 February, stating that he had been criminally detained for "inciting subversion of state power." Officers and security guards later searched his home, confiscating a computer, two hard drives and a USB drive, and then held him at the Suining City Detention Center.

Chinese Human Rights Defenders reported on 17 December 2011 that Chen's case had been transferred to the Suining Municipal Intermediate People's Court at the end of November 2011. Authorities reportedly attempted to prevent Chen's wife from hiring lawyer Liang Xiaojun. Liang was ultimately only permitted to see Chen once, while his other lawyer, Zheng Jianwei, saw him only twice before the trial. Chen told his lawyer that he had not broken the law and that he had merely been exercising the right guaranteed to all Chinese citizens under the Chinese Constitution to express their views. Chen's lawyer was told that the trial would be held within one week.

On 23 December 2011, the Suining Municipal Intermediate People's Court sentenced Chen to nine years in prison after he was convicted of "incitement to subversion" over four essays he wrote and published online. The essays were said to contravene article 105 of China's criminal code.

The European Union ambassador to Beijing, Markus Ederer, said the EU was "deeply concerned" about Chen's sentence and "we encourage political debate rather than the use of criminal law as a means to resolve diverging political opinions". Amnesty International declared him a prisoner of conscience and called for his immediate release. Human Rights Watch condemned the arrest as part of China's most severe crackdown on activists in a decade, and called for an immediate response from the international community.

== See also ==
- 2011 Chinese pro-democracy protests
- China's 2011 crackdown on dissidents
