= Zhu Yufu =

Chinese pro-democracy activist

Zhu Yufu (Chinese: 朱虞夫; pinyin: Zhū Yúfū), born 13 February 1953 in Hangzhou, Zhejiang, China, is a political dissident. In 1998, he was one of the founders of the unrecognized Democracy Party of China (DPC). He also founded the "Opposition Party" magazine, carrying articles about the DPC. He was jailed for publishing a poem that directed people to participate in the 2011 Chinese pro-democracy protests.

== Biography ==
Formerly a property worker at the Hangzhou City Shangcheng District Urban Housing Bureau, Zhu was convicted of inciting subversion of state power in 1999 and served five and a half years in prison for founding the "Opposition Party" magazine. After his release in 2006, he spoke out against the torture he had suffered in prison and continued to promote democratization. In 2007 he was detained again after a confrontation with a police officer who was questioning his son, and was sentenced to two years in prison for "beating police and hindering public duty."

Zhu was taken away by police on 7 March 2011. Officers also searched his home, confiscated two computers and other items. Zhu was criminally detained on suspicion of "inciting subversion of state power" and formally arrested on the same charge on 11 April 2011. EveryOne Group has sent an appeal to the Beijing government, calling for the release of the poet. The Italian poet Roberto Malini wrote two poems on the case of Zhu Yufu, which are published in his book "Dichiarazione" (Piombino, March 2013).

On March 3, 2021, two days before the annual plenary sessions of 2021, Zhu's political rights were restored by the authorities.

== See also ==
- 2011 crackdown on dissidents in the People's Republic of China
