= Cao Haibo (dissident) =

Chinese dissident

- Born: 23 April 1985 (age 41)
- Occupation: Small business owner
- Known for: Pro-democracy activism
- Spouse: Zhang Yan

Cao Haibo (born 23 April 1985) is a Chinese dissident who sentenced to eight years in prison for attempting to found an opposition political party in the People's Republic of China, named the China Republican Party. A court in Kunming, Yunnan province, sentenced him to eight years in prison for "subversion of state power" (a more serious charge than inciting subversion of state power, which he had originally been charged with) in trying to form a party and for online messages criticising the ruling Chinese Communist party. His lawyer, Ma Xiaopeng, announced plans to appeal the conviction and sentences.

With a reduction of 13 months from his sentence Cao was released from jail on 20 September 2018.

== See also ==
- List of Chinese dissidents
