= Joske =

Joske is a surname. Notable people with the surname include:

- Alex Joske, Chinese-Australian author, sinologist, open-source intelligence researcher, and risk consultant
- Percy Joske (1895–1981), Australian lawyer, politician, and judge

== See also ==
- Joske's
