= Jo Ling Kent =

American reporter

- Born: May 11, 1984 (age 42); San Francisco, California, U.S.
- Occupations: Journalist; correspondent
- Spouse: Scott Conroy (m. 2015)
- Children: 2

Jo Ling Kent (born May 11, 1984) is an American reporter. She has worked for NBC, Fox Business, and CNN, and currently works as a correspondent for CBS News.

== Early life and education ==
Jo Ling Kent was born in San Francisco, California to Shean Yen Janice Kent and David Kent, and raised in Minnetonka, Minnesota where she graduated from Hopkins High School in 2002. Her mother is Taiwanese and her father is Caucasian American.

She was an undergraduate at Rice University and earned graduate degrees in international affairs from both the London School of Economics and Peking University. Kent was also a Fulbright scholar at Peking University Law School Center.

== Career ==
In 2008, after graduating from college, Kent worked as a translator and writer for ABC News in Beijing. Kent would return to Beijing to work for CNN as an associate producer after graduating from the London School of Economics. On February 27, 2011 while working as a field producer during the 2011 Chinese pro-democracy protests in Beijing, Kent and CNN reporter Eunice Yoon were detained by police in Wangfujing for half an hour. They had been reporting on the protests when an officer knocked Kent’s camera out of her hands and physically forced them into a bank where they were detaining several other journalists.

In 2012, Kent joined NBC's affiliate WVIT in Connecticut as a field reporter and blogger. There she extensively covered the 2012 presidential election as an embedded reporter, and her team won a Peabody Award for coverage of the Sandy Hook Elementary School shooting. She joined Fox Business Network in 2013 as a technology reporter.

From 2016 to 2023, Kent was a correspondent with NBC News. In June, 2020, Kent was in the field reporting on the George Floyd protests in Seattle, Washington when she was hit on-air by a Seattle Police Department flash-bang grenade. The device burnt part of her clothing but she was not significantly injured.

During her second pregnancy in April, 2021, Kent received a COVID-19 vaccine shot on air during a report about the vaccine and pregnancy.

Kent joined CBS News in 2023.

== Personal life ==
Kent has been married to Scott Conroy, an author and reporter for HuffPost, since 2015. The couple has two daughters, one born in 2018 and another in April 2021.

She is fluent in Mandarin Chinese.
