= Peking University Law School =

Law school of Peking University, Beijing, China

- School Logo
- Type: Law school
- Established: 1904; 122 years ago
- Parent institution: Peking University
- Academic staff: 70 - 80
- Undergraduates: 700
- Postgraduates: 1100
- Doctoral students: 200
- Location: Haidian, Beijing, China; 39°59′35.74″N 116°18′26.89″E
- Website: law.pku.edu.cn
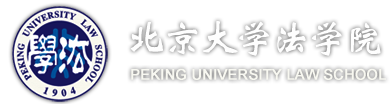

Peking University Law School (Chinese: 北京大学法学院) is a law school of Peking University, a public research university in Beijing, China.

Founded in 1904 as the law department of Peking University, it is the oldest law school in China. From 2015 to 2017, it was ranked first in Mainland China and one of top three law schools in Asia by QS World University Rankings. It has been generally regarded as one of the most competitive and selective law schools in China. As of 2017, the school's Bachelor of Laws students had the highest average scores in China's college entrance examination among all law schools in China, with the average acceptance rate of Master of Laws and Juris Master being less than 10% in 2017.

Peking University Law School confers four types of law degrees: Bachelor of Laws, Master of Laws, Juris Master, and Doctor of Laws. As of 2017, PKU LAW employed more than 70 professors and had 36 research centers. Four of the law school's disciplines including Legal Theory Studies, Constitution and Administrative Law Studies, Economic Law Studies, and Criminal Law Studies were ranked the best in China as of 2017. The school publishes 11 legal journals, including Peking University Law Journal (edited by staff members) and Peking University Law Review (edited by students).

Peking University Law School alumni include China's former Premier Li Keqiang and as of 2017 four of the justices of China's Supreme Court, Jiang Bixin, Nan Ying, Sun Huapu and Pei Xianding. According to a survey conducted in 2017, 246 partners of China's top eight law firms were PKU LAW alumni, more than the second and the third-ranked law school combined. The school is also the workplace for legal scholar Zhang Qianfan.

== History ==
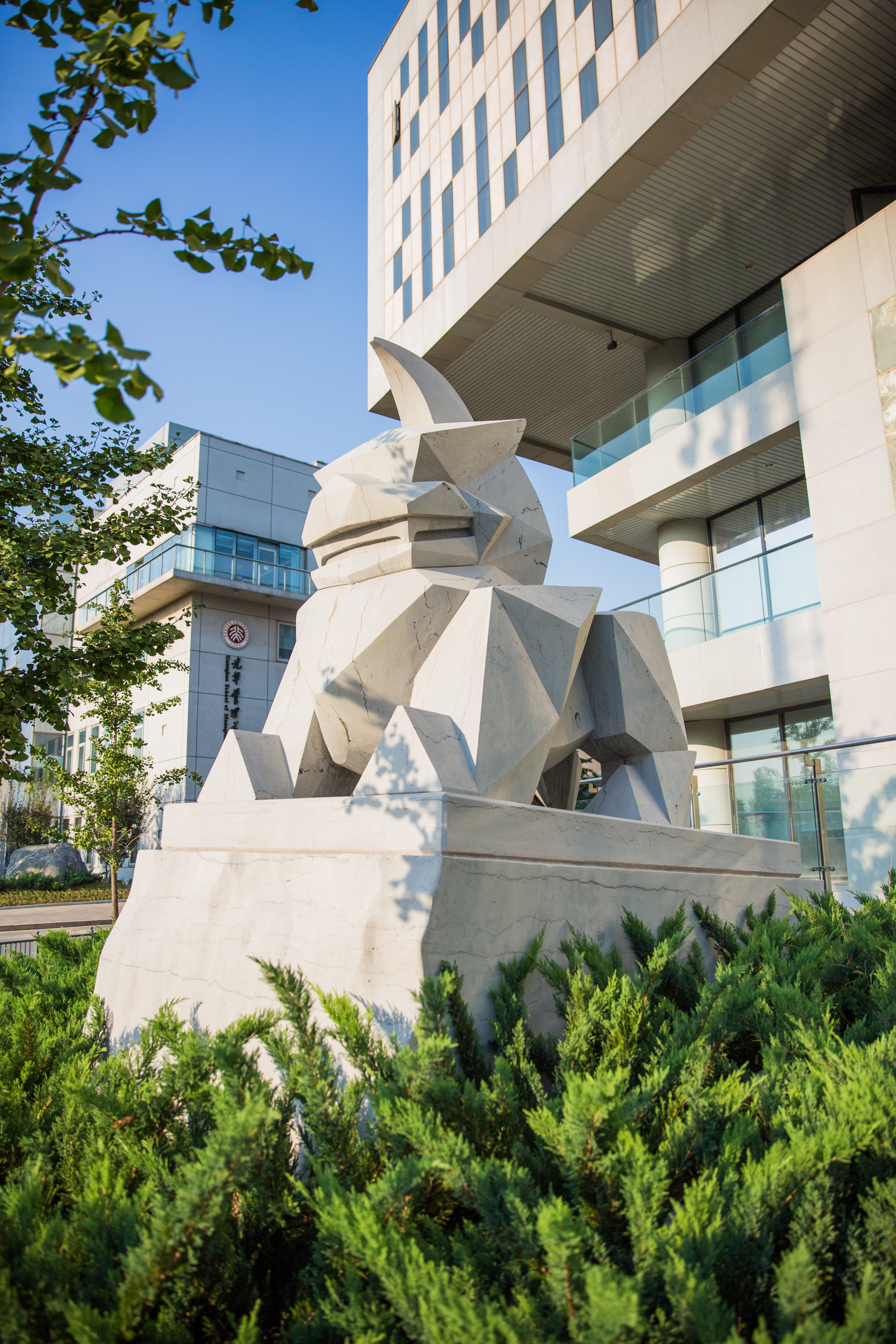
Sculpture of a Xiezhi in front of PKU Law's Kaiyuan Building, named after Chinese American businessman Leo KoGuan

Founded in 1904, Peking University Law School is China's oldest law school. Its parent institution, Peking University, is the first national university in modern China. In 1898, China's young emperor Guang Xu and his supporters initiated the "Hundred Days' Reform", the reform was an attempt to modernize China by reforming its government, economy, and society. The short-lived reform saw the establishment of the Imperial University of Peking, which started offering law courses in 1902. It was one of only two law schools not to be closed during the upheaval of the Cultural Revolution in 1966–1976.

On May 24, 2003, in the case of Sun Zhigang, three graduate students at the law school, Xu Zhiyong, Teng Biao and Yu Jiang submitted a proposal regarding the Measures of Custody and Repatriation for Urban Vagrants and Beggars to the Standing Committee of the National People's Congress, citing concerns that the provisions restricted personal freedom of citizens and contradicted with the civil rights protection clauses of the Constitution. The proposal urged the committee to conduct a review of the provisions' constitutionality. The State Council of China formally revoked the Measures of Custody and Repatriation for Urban Vagrants and Beggars on June 20, 2020. This case has been regarded as a landmark case of China's civil rights protection movement.

In 2005, three professors and three graduate students at the law school filed the first public interest litigation in China, asking the Heilongjiang Higher People's Court to fine the defendant PetroChina a total of 10 billion Yuan to set up a public fund to restore the environment of the Songhua River, which was seriously polluted by an explosion of a Diphenyl Plant owned by PetroChina. However, the court refused to accept the case citing political concerns.

In 2009, the Faculty of Law of Peking University banned the university's students from expressing any support for Charter 08, which was an appeal made to the Chinese government for greater democracy and for respect for human rights.

== Periodicals ==
- Peking University Law Journal
- Peking University Law Review

== Notable faculty ==
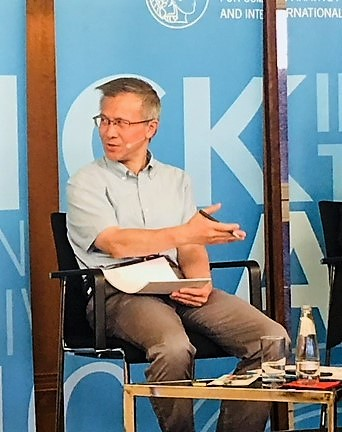
Zhang Qianfan

- Zhang Qianfan (born 1964): constitutional law, comparative constitution, Chinese constitution, constitutional theory
- He Weifang (born 1960): history of western legal ideology, legal theory, comparative law, judiciary, foreign legal history
- Jiang Shigong (born 1967): jurisprudence, constitutional law, Hong Kong legal studies, legal sociology
- Wang Jiancheng (born 1962): criminal procedure law, evidence law

== Notable alumni ==
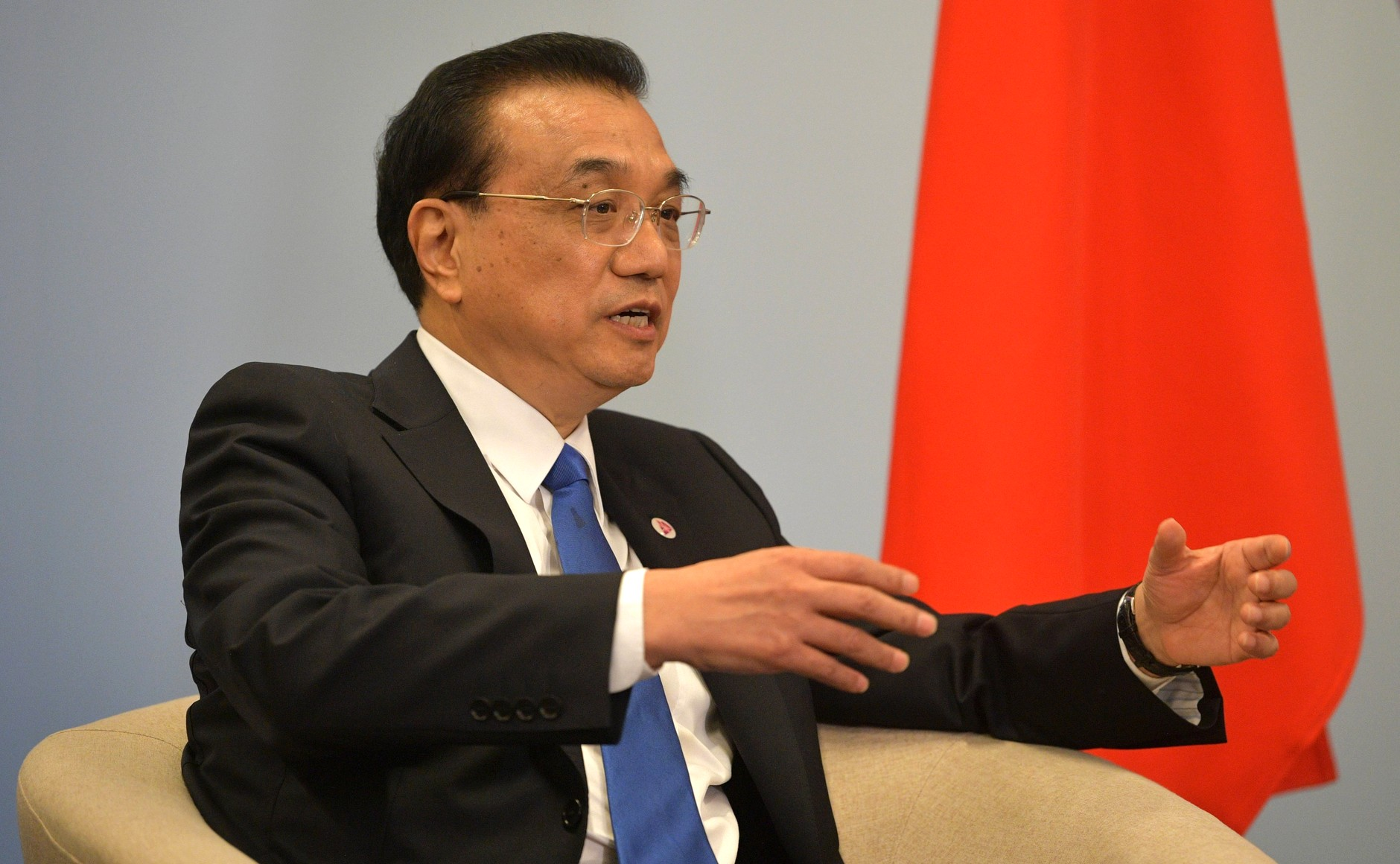
Li Keqiang

Peking University Law School has alumni that include the former Premier of China Li Keqiang. Li Keqiang was enrolled in the law school in 1977, when the school resumed admission following the end of the cultural revolution. Four sitting justices of China's Supreme Court are alumni of Peking University Law school.

The school's alumni also include Wang Tieya, international jurist and former Justice of the International Criminal Tribunal of the former Yugoslavia; Zhang Guohua, legal historian, one of the founders of the studies of Chinese legal thought history; and Luo Haocai, administrative law jurist and former justice of China's supreme court.

Journalist Dong Yuyu, arrested by Chinese authorities in 2022 on charges of espionage, graduated from the law school in 1987.

Chess grandmaster and World Chess Champion Ding Liren is an alumnus of Peking University Law School.

== Affiliated research institutions ==
- PKU Institute of International Law
- PKU Research Centre for Law & Economics
- PKU Institute of Economic Law
- PKU Institute of Modern Law
- PKU Research Centre for Crime
- PKU Real Estate Law Center
- PKU Institute of Comparative Law & Sociology of Law
- PKU Fiscal Law Research Center
- PKU Science & Technology Law Center
- PKU Center for Public Participation Studies & Supports
- PKU Center for Hong Kong & Macao Studies
- PKU Civil Law Research Centre
- PKU Financial Law Research Centre
- PKU Corporate Finance & Law Research Centre
- PKU Centre for Resources, Energy & Environmental Law Studies
- PKU Soft Law Studies
- PKU Institute of Labor Law & Social Security Act
- PKU Joint Center for China-US Law & Policy Studies
- PKU Center for Human Rights & Humanitarian Law Studies
- PKU Research Center for Clear Society
- PKU Tax Law Research Centre
- PKU Center for Charity, Sports & Law
- PKU Research Center for NPO Law
- PKU-Yale Joint Centre for Law & Policy Reform Studies
- PKU Institute of International Economic Law
- PKU Research Centre for Competition Law
- PKU Maritime Law Research Centre
- PKU Corporation & Company Law Research Centre
- PKU Centre for People's Congress & Foreign Legislature Studies
- PKU Centre for International Intellectual Property Law
- PKU Centre for Constitution Administrative Law Studies
- China's Centre for Enterprise Legal Risk Management Studies
- PKU Institute of Positive Law
- PKU Research Centre for Education Law
- PKU Centre for WTO Law Study
- PKU Law & Development Academy

== See also ==
- Peking University School of Transnational Law
