= Ding Mao =

Chinese dissident and leader of the student democracy movement

- 丁矛
- Born: 9 November 1968 (age 57); Mianyang, Sichuan, China
- Occupation: Entrepreneur
- Known for: 1989 Tiananmen Square protest, 2011 Chinese pro-democracy protests

Chinese name
- Chinese: 丁矛
Transcriptions
Standard Mandarin
- Hanyu Pinyin: Dīng Máo
- Wade–Giles: Ting Mao

Ding Mao (Chinese: 丁矛), born in Mianyang, Sichuan on 9 November 1968, is a Chinese dissident. As a student, he was one of the leaders of the student democracy movement, known through the Tiananmen Square 1989 protest. He became general manager of an investment company, and one of the founders of the unrecognized Social Democratic Party. Mao was recently detained on 19 February 2011, and held at Mianyang Municipal Detention Center before being released into residential surveillance on 2 December 2011.

== Biography ==
Ding Mao was a philosophy student at Lanzhou University in the late 1980s. There he became a student leader of the 1989 pro-democracy protests. He was twice imprisoned for his activism, first in 1989 and again in 1992 when he was arrested for organizing the Social Democratic Party. He has spent a total of 10 years in jail.

== Detention during Jasmine Crackdown ==
On 19 February 2011, Mao was detained in Chengdu, Sichuan Province by police on "inciting subversion of state power". He was held at Mianyang Municipal Detention Centre for 286 days before being released into residential supervision.

Police in Mianyang City had blocked meetings between Ding and a lawyer hired for him by his family because, claiming that Ding's case "involved state secrets".

== See also ==
- 2011 Chinese pro-democracy protests
- China's 2011 crackdown on dissidents
