= Spies and Lies =

Spies and Lies may refer to:

- Spies and Lies (novel), 1992 Nancy Drew and Hardy Boys cross-over mystery novel
- Spies and Lies (Joske book), 2022 book about Chinese espionage by Alex Joske
- "Spies and Lies", the 5th episode of NCIS: New Orleans (season 6)

== See also ==
- Catch and Kill: Lies, Spies, and a Conspiracy to Protect Predators, a 2019 book about sexual abuse in Hollywood by Ronan Farrow
- Spies, Lies and the Superbomb, a 2007 BBC docudrama on the history of nuclear weapons
- The Challenge: Spies, Lies & Allies, season 37 of reality TV show The Challenge
