= Wu Lebao =

Chinese dissident

- 吴乐宝
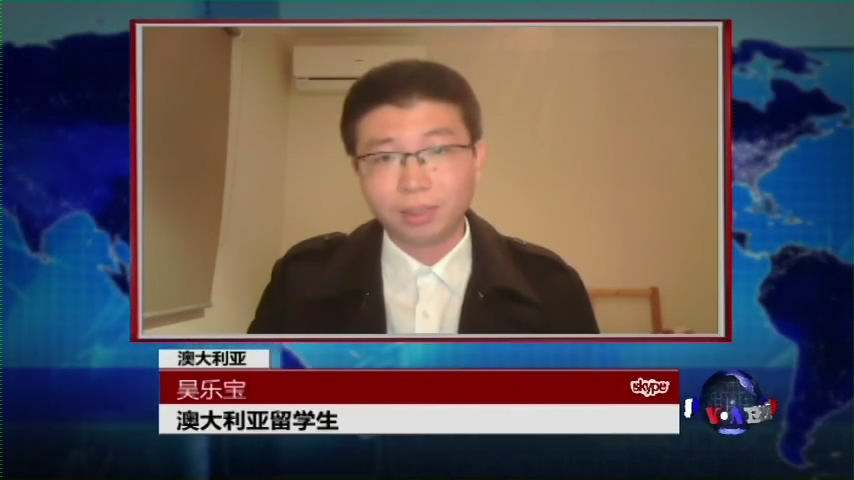
- Born: 8 June 1983 (age 42); Bengbu, Anhui, China
- Education: Harbin Engineering University
- Occupation: cyber-dissident
- Years active: 2011–present
- Known for: Chinese Jasmine Revolution Criticism on Chinese influence in democratic countries On the blacklist of publication and printing in China
- Website: Wu Lebao on Twitter

Wu Lebao (simplified Chinese: 吴乐宝; traditional Chinese: 吳樂寶) (born 8 June 1983) is a cyber-dissident from Bengbu, Anhui, People's Republic of China. Wu is an active critic of the Chinese government and its foreign influence, and has expressed concerns about the impact on freedom in Australia and other democratic countries during many of his media interviews. He has claimed that the Chinese Students and Scholars Association is directly controlled by Chinese embassies and Chinese government, and that it has intentionally worked to sabotage academic freedom in campuses of Western universities. In 2019, media revealed that Lebao was among one hundred or so dissidents, including Ai Weiwei, 14th Dalai Lama, and Liu Xiaobo, whose name and works are totally forbidden to print in China even for oversea publications.

Wu Lebao suspected of leading the Chinese Jasmine Revolution with Ai Weiwei and was interrogated by the Public Security Bureau of the People's Republic of China.

He was formally arrested on 14 July 2011, and detained in Bengbu's No. 2 Detention Center for 'inciting subversion of state power' over three months. He was bailed on 28 October 2011, but was forbidden to get in touch with other Chinese dissidents. As reported, he was tortured during the detention.

He departed China after his bail was ceased in February 2013. After he arrived in Australia, he declared that he did not lead the Chinese Jasmine Revolution. He had then settled in Melbourne, Victoria, Australia.

In May 2015, Wu, as a Chinese refugee, participated in a signatory of an open letter with Gu Yi appealing that Chinese Government end its secrecy over the Tiananmen Square massacre and hold those responsible to account. Mr Wu took an interview with The Guardian, in the report, Wu was titled as “China's lonely voice of dissent refuses to forget the victims of Tiananmen Square”. Wu told his story about his imprisonment in China, and his concern about the Chinese influence will impact the freedom of speech in Australia.

In 2016, Lebao and his friends published an open letter on Change Org to support Wu Wei, a tutor from University of Sydney who burned his Chinese passport and then was attacked by Chinese students. In the letter, Lebao argued that "the burning of a Chinese passport is only Mr. Wu's way of expressing political dissent." It believes that Wu Wei "is becoming a victim of the Chinese government’s increasingly intrusive attempts to curb voices of dissent among overseas Chinese."

Later in that year, Lebao gave an interview with a journalist from Woroni, the Newspaper of Australian National University, revealing that he had commenced studies there. Lebao is often harassed by Chinese students at ANU because of his political views and his refugee background. In September 2016, Lebao and his friend Alex Joske, who was a student journalist at ANU then, attended a gala organised by Chinese student in their university. They were trailed to a bathroom by those Chinese Students and Scholars Association organisers. Lately in 2017, Lebao and Alex published an exposé in Woroni about the Chinese Students and Scholars Association. They gave detail about the incident they experienced in the gala.

In 2018, Mr Wu participated in the Global campus movement "No my president", which was initiated by a large number of oversea Chinese descent students showing their rejection to Chinese Communist Party general secretary Xi Jinping. This movement spread to many western countries outside China, In Australian National University, Mr Wu posted many posts in multiple places.

Lebao's name and works were revealed on a blacklist for printing in China even for foreign publishers in February 2019. The list was obtained by The Age and The Sydney Morning Herald. It was given to Australian publishers to censor political issues which are rejected by the Chinese regime. The list banned over one hundred dissidents’ related words from printing in China, Nobel Peace Prize Laureates, Liu Xiaobo, and the 14th Dalai Lama were included in the list. In his late interview with The Sydney Morning Herald, Lebao said: “China has just got more and more aggressive; they cannot be satisfied by their censorship in China, they would like to expand it to western countries, especially Australia since we have a large Chinese population.”
