= Wang Jiancheng =

Wang Jiancheng (Chinese: 汪建成; pinyin: Wāng Jiànchéng; born 1962) is a Chinese scholar of criminal procedure law, former Dean of Law Department, Yantai University, and currently a professor at Peking University Law School.

== Biography ==
Wang was born in Taihu, Anhui in 1962. He received his LL.B. and LL.M degrees from Peking University Law School in 1983 and 1986, and received his LL.D. degree from Renmin University of China Law School in 1999.

Wang joined the faculty of Yantai University in 1986 and became the Dean of the Department of Law from 1996 to 1999. After August 1999, Wang became a professor at Beijing University Law School.

Wang was a visiting scholar in Catholic University of Leuven from 1994 to 1996, and in Yale Law School from 2004 to 2005.

In 2005, Wang was elected as one of Distinguished Contemporary Chinese Jurists.

Wang is Deputy President of the China Procedural Law Association.
