= Li Bifeng =

Sichuanese activist and poet (born 1964)

- 李必丰
- Born: 1964 (age 61–62); Mianyang, Sichuan, China
- Occupations: Activist, poet, writer
- Writing career
- Notable work: Die Flügel des Himmels (lit. 'The Wings of Heaven')

Li Bifeng (born 1964 in Mianyang, Sichuan, China) is a Sichuanese activist, poet, and Christian. He has been imprisoned since 1998.

== Life and imprisonment ==
The poet and campaigner for democracy, Li Bifeng, wrote a report in 1998 about a courageous sit-in of a group of textile workers on a Chinese highway. He passed the report to human rights organizations abroad. In 1989, he was arrested and sentenced to 5 years because of "economic crimes", after he had taken part in the 1989 Tiananmen Square protests and had been on the run for half a year.

After being released from prison in 1994, Li joined an "unofficial church" and established an organization of conscience-based care for Chinese with fellow Christians to conduct written reports on the living conditions of laid-off workers, women, and children across the country, providing information and acting on both domestic and international levels. In 1998, he was arrested again and sentenced to 7 years in prison for "economic fraud".

In November 2012, 48-year-old Li was sentenced to another twelve years in prison with no plausible reason or evidence and despite worldwide protests. The authorities accused him of helping his friend Liao Yiwu, the writer and winner of the Peace Prize of the German Book Trade in 2012, when he fled to Germany.

On 4 June 2013, the Berlin International Literature Festival held a worldwide reading for Li Bifeng.

== See also ==
- Wang Yi (pastor)
- Protestantism in Sichuan
