= Zhang Qianfan =

Chinese constitutional law professor

- Zhang in 2018
- Born: January 1964 (age 62); Nanjing, Jiangsu, China

Education
- Education: University of Texas at Austin; Carnegie-Mellon University; Nanjing University

Philosophical work
- Era: Constitutional law

Chinese name
- Traditional Chinese: 張千帆
- Simplified Chinese: 张千帆
- Hanyu Pinyin: Zhāng Qiānfān

Zhang Qianfan (张千帆; born January 1964) is a constitutional law professor at Peking University Law School, and an activist who advocates constitutionalism in China and has called for China's general political and judicial reform.

== Life ==
Zhang was born in Nanjing and raised in Shanghai. He is an alumnus of Nanjing University, where he studied Solid State Physics as an undergraduate. He earned a CUSPEA scholarship to attend Carnegie-Mellon University, Pittsburgh, PA, where he received a PhD degree in biophysics in 1989. After 2 years of doing postdoctoral research, he attended the University of Maryland to study law but dropped out after the first year because he could not afford the tuition. In 1995, he was awarded a scholarship to attend the University of Texas at Austin and received a PhD degree in Governmental Theory in 1999.

Zhang left the United States and taught law at Nanjing University in 1999. He later became a constitutional law professor at the Peking University Law School in Beijing. He also serves as senior deputy director of Peking University Administrative and Constitutional Law Center and director of the Law School's Congress and Parliamentary Studies Centre.

== Academics ==
He is the author of several hundreds academic publications. His book Constitutional System in the West helped introduce western constitutionalism in Chinese. His book The Constitution of China: A Contextual Analysis was published in the United States in 2012.

Zhang advocates for a Confucian-style "constitutional middle-way politics." His view emphasizes resolving political debate and conflict through fixed principles of the social contract, constitutional democracy, and political natural law.

== Event ==
In February 2019, his textbook, Study of Constitutional Law: Principles and Applications was withdrawn from book stores and university teaching materials in China, as part of a nationwide check on constitutional law textbooks launched by the Ministry of Education earlier that year. Zhang stated in response that "As an academic discipline, constitutional law should not be politicized. If it is, there will be no knowledge, as politicization and knowledge are incompatible". He also noted that this development represented a "retreat" from China's own constitution, of which Article 35 guarantees freedoms of speech and publication.
