= Early Rain Covenant Church =

Church in Chengdu, Sichuan, China

- 秋雨聖約教會
- ERCC logo
- Abbreviation: ERCC
- Classification: Christianity
- Orientation: Protestant
- Scripture: Protestant Bible
- Theology: Calvinist
- Polity: Presbyterian
- Pastor: Wang Yi
- Elders: Zhou Maojian; Chen Zhongdong
- Elders: Li Yingqiang; Tan Defu
- Region: Chengdu
- Language: Sichuanese; Standard Chinese
- Liturgy: Reformed worship
- Headquarters: Chengdu
- Founder: Wang Yi; Jiang Rong
- Origin: 2005 (fellowship group); 2008 (house church); Chengdu, Sichuan, China
- Members: 500–900+ (2018)
- Other names: Early Rain Blessings Church; Early Rain Reformed Church; Early Rain Reformed Presbyterian Church

Early Rain Covenant Church (traditional Chinese: 秋雨聖約教會; simplified Chinese: 秋雨圣约教会; pinyin: Qiūyǔ Shèngyuē Jiàohuì; Sichuanese romanization: Tsiu-ü Shen-io Chiao-hue; lit. 'Autumn Rain Covenant Church') is a house church within the Reformed Presbyterian tradition based in the Sichuanese provincial capital city of Chengdu, southwestern China. It was established as Early Rain Blessings Fellowship by Pastor Wang Yi and his wife, Jiang Rong, in their own home in Chengdu, in April 2005. The small congregation has evolved into a house church three years later, and since then it had been variously known as Early Rain Blessings Church, Early Rain Reformed Church and Early Rain Reformed Presbyterian Church before adopting its current name.

== Name ==
According to a pastoral letter from Elder Li Yingqiang, the native name of the church, "Autumn Rain", comes from Psalm 84:6: "When they walk through the Valley of Weeping, it will become a place of refreshing springs. The autumn rains will clothe it with blessings."

== Historical background ==
The first Protestant missionaries to reach Sichuan were Griffith John of the London Missionary Society and Alexander Wylie of the British and Foreign Bible Society, when the two, in 1868, visited many of the most important towns and markets, including the capital, Chengdu. However, this journey was a "prospecting trip" without establishing mission stations. The first settled mission work had not been opened up until 1877.

Among the twenty or so missionary societies working in this province before 1950, the London Missionary Society was the only one of a Reformed background. Griffith John, a member of the Congregational church, returned in 1888 to take up permanent work in Sichuan. Thomas Torrance, a Scottish Presbyterian minister serving under the American Bible Society, was a missionary in Chengdu from 1910 to 1934.

== History ==
In 2005, three years before the establishment of what would become Early Rain Blessings Church, a Bible study group was received at Wang Yi's home in Chengdu. This small group, later known as Early Rain Blessings Fellowship, has evolved into a house church and was formally established as Early Rain Blessings Church on May 25, 2008, just thirteen days after the 2008 Sichuan earthquake.

In late May 2008, the Fellowship invited Peng Qiang, pastor of Chengdu Enfu Reformed Gospel Church, to ordain Wang Yi, Zhou Maojian and Chen Zhongdong as elders. In July, an office space was leased to the church as their first public sanctuary. This was followed by the distribution of self-printed Sunday bulletins. According to Meng, a former Three-Self Church member, who joined Early Rain Church in December 2008, "they were a very different group from a Three-Self church", they prayed for the June Fourth victims and repented on behalf of the country.

On July 14, 2009, 63 church members were forbidden to enter Early Rain's leased apartment by the subdistrict office at West Wenmiao Street. A second obstruction of their worship occurred the next Sunday, the service had to be moved into a nearby hotel conference room, where fifty church members voted to elect Chen, Wang and Zhou as their first board of three elders, and several deacons. In September 2009, with the help of a few resourceful members, the church purchased a commercial space on the 19th floor of Jiangxin Building, in the district of Qingyang. The same year, Wang Huasheng joined Early Rain as one of its full-time ministers. By May 2010, the church had 190 attendees; membership grew to over 250 at the end of July.

As the church grew larger, several other house churches in Chengdu have joined Early Rain over time to form the Presbytery of West China Reformed Churches. This has led to other institutional extensions such as a kindergarten, a day school, a seminary (Western China Covenant Theological Seminary), and a liberal arts college for classical Christian education (Western China Covenant College). As of December 2018, the membership of Early Rain Covenant Church was over 500. An ABC News report on December 15, 2018 stated that the original church had 600 to 700 members, with approximately 200 attending its "branch" churches. These numbers did not include catechumens.

== Belief ==
During an interview with Wang Yi conducted by Yu Jie in 2011, the interviewee stated that, Early Rain Covenant Church acknowledges the four formal creeds: Apostles' Creed, Nicene Creed, Chalcedonian Creed and Athanasian Creed, and follows the Belgic Confession and the Westminster Confession of Faith.

== Persecution ==
Early Rain Covenant Church has been subjected to repeated persecution, which culminated in December 2018 with a massive crackdown by Chengdu police. 100 church members, including Pastor Wang Yi and his wife, Jiang Rong, were detained. The church has been banned and its properties were confiscated by the government. In December 2019, Wang Yi, who challenged the government's sinicization of the gospel in his 95 Thesis, was sentenced to nine years in prison for "inciting subversion of state power" and "illegal business activity".

On August 14, 2022, Chengdu police raided a 50-member Early Rain Sunday gathering inside a teahouse in the district of Wuhou, and detained the leader. They were accused of holding an "illegal gathering" of a "banned organization". In January 2026, the authorities arrested leaders of the church.

On 14 June 2026, police raided the church during its Sunday service, interrogating at least 30 church members and detaining two of its leaders.

== Notable members ==
In addition to Wang Yi, other notable members of Early Rain Covenant Church include:

- Elder Li Yingqiang, one of the founders of the Liren Rural Library (NGO), who was detained on December 19, 2023, for eight hours, by local police in Deyang.
- Preacher Dai Zhichao, who has been constantly monitored and harassed. He was jailed after a police raid on Sunday meeting on August 22, 2021.
- Ran Yunfei, a writer and a high-profile democracy activist from Chongqing, who was baptized by Pastor Wang Yi at Early Rain Covenant Church. He was charged with "inciting subversion of state power" in 2011, and had been jailed for six months.
- Fu Hailu, an itinerant worker from Xuanhan County, northeastern Sichuan, who was detained on charges of "inciting subversion of state power" in 2016, for selling liquor with references to the 1989 Tiananmen Square protests and massacre on the label (June 4th Liquor Bottle Case). He was sentenced to three years of imprisonment. His wife and son are also members of Early Rain Church.
- Ren Ruiting, who, after the 2018 crackdown, first fled to Taiwan, and then to the United States. She was invited to speak at the 2022 International Religious Freedom Summit.

== See also ==
- Shouwang Church – a house church in Beijing, north China
- Antireligious campaigns of the Chinese Communist Party
