= Wang Yi (pastor) =

Reformed pastor of Chinese house church

Personal life
- Born: June 1, 1973 (age 53) Santai, Mianyang, Sichuan, China
- Education: Sichuan University
- Other name: Wang Shuya
- Occupation: Pastor

Religious life
- Religion: Reformed Protestantism
- Founder of: Early Rain Covenant Church

Senior posting
- Awards: Liu Xiaobo Courage to Write Award

Wang Yi (Chinese: 王怡; pinyin: Wáng Yí; born June 1, 1973), pen name Wang Shuya (simplified Chinese: 王书亚; traditional Chinese: 王書亞; pinyin: Wáng Shūyà), is the founding pastor of the Early Rain Covenant Church, a Calvinist house church in Chengdu. He is also a productive writer, editor, and social activist, and was a legal scholar at Chengdu University before he resigned to take up the pastorate.

== Biography ==
Wang Yi is a native of Santai County located in the city of Mianyang, which lies to the northeast of Chengdu. In 1996, he graduated from Sichuan University and began teaching law at Chengdu University. He was a vocal human rights advocate and his cultural and political commentary brought Wang Yi national attention.

In 2004, he was included in the list of "50 Most Influential Public Intellectuals of China" by Southern People Weekly. In 2005, he was converted, baptized, and started to serve in the house church. He was among the few pioneering Christian human-rights attorneys in China.

Wang Yi met with President George W. Bush at the White House in 2006, together with Yu Jie, a democracy activist from Sichuan, and Li Boguang, a human rights attorney from Hunan, to discuss religious freedom in China. He returned to Washington, D.C. in 2008, to attend the Conference for Global Christians in Law and was awarded "Prize for the Contribution to Promoting Religious Freedom."

In 2008, he resigned from Chengdu University and founded Early Rain Reformed Church (秋雨之福归正教会; Qiūyǔ Zhīfú Guīzhèng Jiàohuì) in Chengdu (later renamed Early Rain Covenant Church). In October 2011, he was ordained and became the senior pastor of the church. The church had a membership of about 700 before it was closed down in late 2018.

Wang Yi was one of China's best-known pastors in the West. He and Early Rain have been profiled in The Atlantic and New York Times, and the subject of a number of journalist and academic works. A review by the editorial board of the Washington Post called Wang "a paragon of the noble aspiration that people be allowed to think, speak, worship and assemble freely".

On 9 December 2018, he and over 100 other members of the church were arrested by Chinese authorities, who simultaneously banned any reporting of the crackdown. This action is being objected to by the US Ambassador at Large for International Religious Freedom. After he had been detained for 48 hours, the Early Rain Covenant Church released Wang's "My Declaration of Faithful Disobedience" written two months earlier in anticipation of his arrest.

On 18 December 2018, Wang was transferred to the Chengdu Detention Center after being taken into custody by Chinese authorities."Pastor Wang Yi Not Yet Transferred to Prison; Family Visit at Detention Center Brings Out Recent Photo".

On 30 December 2019, Wang was given a prison sentence of nine years by Chengdu Intermediate People's Court for "inciting subversion of state power and illegal business operations." The sentence also included the stripping of his political rights for three years and the confiscation of his personal assets of RMB 50,000 (US$ 7,000). He is currently incarcerated at Jintang Prison in Chengdu."Concerns Grow Over the Situation of Chengdu Early Rain Church Pastor Wang Yi in Prison".

On 31 December 2019, U.S. State Department called China for Wang's immediate and unconditional release in a statement, saying "This is yet another example of Beijing's intensification of repression of Chinese Christians and members of other religious groups".

Statement on the Conviction of Chinese Christian Pastor Wang Yi

We are alarmed that Pastor Wang Yi, leader of the Early Rain Covenant Church in Chengdu, was tried in secret and sentenced to nine years in prison in connection to his peaceful advocacy for religious freedom. We call for his immediate and unconditional release.

This is yet another example of Beijing’s intensification of repression of Chinese Christians and members of other religious groups. We continue to call on Beijing to uphold its international commitments and promises made in its own constitution to promote religious freedom for all individuals.

— U.S. Department of State, 31 December 2019

On 1 January 2020, the embassy of the Netherlands in Beijing posted a message on Chinese social network Sina Weibo, which emphasized the importance of freedom of religion, with a screenshot of the Chinese court document about the sentence of Wang Yi.

== Theology ==
Wang Yi argues that the idea of the separation of church and state originated from the Calvinist tradition. He criticizes the Three-Self Patriotic Movement, the official supervisory body for Protestantism in the People's Republic of China, as emphasizing nationalism, which he claims results in a worship of secular authorities at the cost of valuing the local community. Instead, he argues for the separation of church and state which he suggests is a constitutional polity legitimized by a transcendent power – namely, a sovereign God. Furthermore, he claims that the nation cannot interfere with church affairs, on one hand, and should be obliged to protect the religious freedom out of the divine duty, on the other.

Wang wants to promote the transparency and publicity of the Chinese house church. Wang argues that churches ought to not only listen for God's voice, but also engage in public affairs. For him, the Reformed church in China should have a pastoral mission for the Chinese church and a prophetic mission for Chinese society. According to Fredrik Fällman, Wang Yi sees this as the mechanism by which "New Genevas" are established throughout China, akin to John Calvin's reforms in Geneva.

== Works ==
Wang Yi is a prolific writer, preacher and blogger. Many of his works have been compiled at wangyilibrary.org.

The following works have been translated into English:

1. Faithful Disobedience: Writings on Church and State from a Chinese House Church Movement (Intervarsity Academic, December 6 2022). This collection of writings, compiled in 2010, discusses the house church and their relationship to the Chinese government, including prominent voices such as Jin Tianming, Jin Mingri, and Sun Yi. In this English edition, the editors have provided introductions, notes, and a glossary, and included some documents from the time of Wang Yi’s arrest in December 2018.
2. "My Declaration of Faithful Disobedience". This statement was written in 2018 in anticipation of his arrest. Shortly after his arrest it was posted online in English and shared many times around the world.
3. "Ninety-Five Theses: The Reaffirmation of Our Stance on the House Church". This document, published in August 2015, was an attempt to reaffirm the Chinese house church's position in the relationship between government and society. Echoing Martin Luther's 95 theses, these Chinese 95 theses demonstrate his opinion of the church–state relationship from the perspective of the house church. This document is divided into six sections:
  - Theses 1–17: God's Sovereignty and Biblical Authority.
  - Theses 18–31: God's Law and Christ's Redemption.
  - Theses 32–39: Against the "Sinicization of Christianity".
  - Theses 40–44: Church as the Body of Christ and His Kingdom.
  - Theses 45–72: The Relationship between Two Kingdoms and the Separation of Church and State.
  - Theses 73–95: Against the "Three-Self Movement" and Affirmation of the Great Commission.

== See also ==
- Li Bifeng
- House church (China)
- Political theology in China
- Protestantism in Sichuan
- Shouwang Church
