= Jiao Guobiao =

Chinese dissident (born 1963)

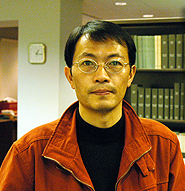
Jiao Guobiao

Jiao Guobiao (simplified Chinese: 焦国标; traditional Chinese: 焦國標; pinyin: jiāo guó biāo; born 1963 in Qi County, Kaifeng, Henan) is a Chinese dissident who was formerly an associate professor at Peking University's College of Journalism and Communications until he was dismissed. A prominent journalist at Chinese Cultural Newspaper from 1996 to 2001, he has published widely on issues of journalism in China. Following the appearance online of his March 2004 essay condemning the Chinese government's Central Propaganda Department (Denouncing the Central Propaganda Department) and his continued efforts to promote freedom of the press and human rights in China, he was suspended from his teaching duties.

Jiao has received media coverage in The New York Times and The Washington Post and has given interviews to the BBC, Voice of America, the French International News Network, and Radio Free Asia. During his fellowship, he explored historical and contemporary perspectives on the Chinese media, and analyzed the impact of the Internet in China. He wrote a series of articles on the challenges and prospects for the media in China, for eventual publication as a book.

== Denouncing the Central Propaganda Department controversy ==
In the spring of 2004, Jiao wrote an essay titled (completely) Denouncing the Central Propaganda Department (of CPC, Communist Party of China). Jiao stated that "at first, I just sent this article to a few friends by email. But a lawyer friend put it onto a website without informing me, and a few days later the vice president of Peking University summoned me to his office. I did not know the article had spread so widely. Many overseas media, such as the Asian Weekly of Hong Kong, Voice of America, The New York Times, even a newspaper in Helsinki, Finland, published the whole article or its summary, or reported the event of its publication."

Jiao was later subjected to periods of close monitoring, house arrest, blacklisting, and persecution. He left China in March 2005 and lived abroad, notably in Germany and England. He returned to China in 2008. In 2012 he was arrested by Chinese authorities and reportedly released on bail after 2 weeks. From 2010 to 2015 he edited an unofficial electronic journal, Five Black Categories, devoted to personal writings about the Mao era. His last known reference in the media was in an article in the South China Morning Post from July 2019 where he was briefly quoted.

== Education ==
Jiao received his Bachelor of Arts in Chinese in 1986 and his Master of Arts in Classic Chinese in 1989 from Henan University. He was awarded his PhD in Journalism from the People's University, Beijing in 1996.

== Major publications ==
•On Dedication and Volunteerism (a collection of journalistic commentaries) Beijing: Overseas Chinese Publisher, 1998

•The Journalistic Careers of Cultural Celebrities (concerning history of journalism) Fuzhou: Fujiang People’s Publisher, 1999

•Sensitivities Outside the News (a collection of journalistic commentaries) Beijing: China Development Publisher, 2000

•The Sorrow from Independence (a collection of journalistic commentaries) Ürümqi: People’s Publisher of Xinjiang, 2001

•Denouncing the Ministry of Central Propaganda (a collection of journalistic writings translated into and published in Japanese) Tokyo, Chaoshi Publisher, 2004

•Many other journalistic writings, essays, commentaries have also been published and are searchable via major Chinese news portals.
