= Alex Joske =

Chinese-Australian sinologist

- 周安瀾
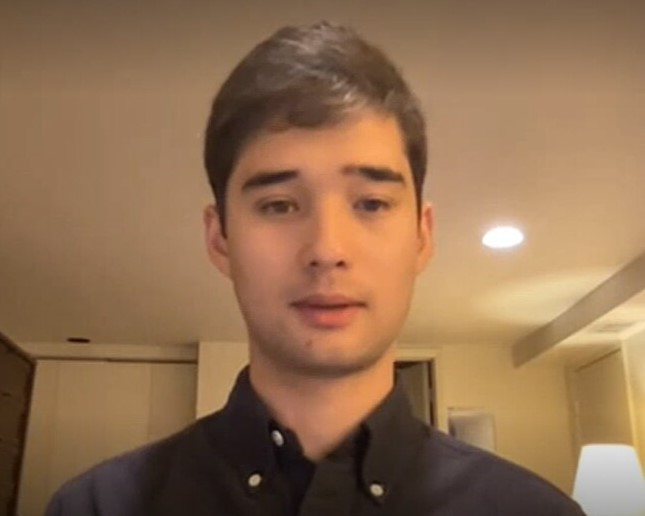
- Joske on Voice of America in October 2022
- Born: Alex W. Joske c. 1996
- Education: Australian National University (BA); National Taiwan Normal University; Canberra Grammar School
- Years active: 2018–present
- Employer(s): McGrathNicol; Australian Strategic Policy Institute

Chinese name
- Traditional Chinese: 周安瀾
- Simplified Chinese: 周安澜
Transcriptions
Standard Mandarin
- Hanyu Pinyin: Zhōu Ānlán
- IPA: [ʈʂoʊ anlán]
- Website: Twitter account

Alex W. Joske (Chinese: 周安瀾; pinyin: Zhōu Ānlán) is a Chinese-Australian author, sinologist, open-source intelligence researcher, and risk consultant who investigates the Chinese Communist Party (CCP), particularly its influence operations. Previously a researcher with the Australian Strategic Policy Institute, his writing has appeared in The New York Times, The Washington Post, and NBC News His first major work influenced legislation in the United States Congress to ban Chinese military (PLA) officials from sensitive U.S. government laboratories. He was publicly banned from entering China by the Chinese government in 2020 due to his work. In 2022, he released his first book, Spies and Lies, about the clandestine operations of the Ministry of State Security and United Front Work Department.

== Early life and career ==
Alex Joske grew up in Beijing as a teenager, and is fluent in Mandarin Chinese. He attended the Australian National University, graduating in 2018 with a Bachelor of Arts in Chinese language. In September 2016, Joske and fellow student, cyber-dissident and Chinese expat Wu Lebao, attended an ANU gala organized by Chinese students. After being reportedly cornered and trailed to a bathroom by organizers from the Chinese Students and Scholars Association, Lebao and Joske published a 2017 exposé in Woroni about the association and their experiences with its members at the gala. Later in his university studies, he spent a year at National Taiwan Normal University studying Chinese. After graduation he spent a year working at Charles Sturt University as a researcher for Clive Hamilton for his book, Silent Invasion: China's Influence in Australia. Both Joske and Hamilton were later banned from China in the same press release from Chinese state-run news.

In 2018, Joske joined the Australian Strategic Policy Institute (ASPI) as its youngest ever researcher, working on China-related analysis for the next four years. At ASPI, he wrote prolifically on the CCP's united front work, the People's Liberation Army (PLA), and the Ministry of State Security (MSS). His first ASPI report "Picking flowers, making honey", on the PLA's use of research collaboration with foreign universities to advance its technology transfer efforts and weapons research, catalyzed legislation in the United States Congress to ban Chinese military researchers from U.S. government-funded laboratories.

In September 2020, Joske was banned from entering China. The Global Times, a CCP mouthpiece, announced his ban – alongside that of Clive Hamilton – without explanation. In a public response, Joske described the ban as "the latest attempt by the Chinese Communist Party to… …punish those who shine a light on its activities", noting that the accuracy of his research had never been challenged by the Chinese government.

In May 2022, he joined Australian corporate risk advisory firm, McGrathNicol, as a senior risk advisor.

In October 2022, Joske released his first book, Spies and Lies, detailing Chinese espionage practices, particularly Chinese intelligence activity abroad. The book attracted attention for its exploration of the MSS' successful cooption of Australian prime minister Bob Hawke to rehabilitate China's image following the 1989 Tiananmen Square protests and massacre. The book was reviewed in Foreign Affairs and The Economist.

In 2024, Joske testified as an expert witness in the trial of Shujun Wang regarding linkages between the MSS and the Overseas Chinese Affairs Office.

== Selected works ==
- Joske, Alex; Stoff, Jeffrey (2020). "The United Front and Technology Transfer". China's Quest for Foreign Technology. Routledge. pp. 258–274. doi:10.4324/9781003035084-20. ISBN 978-1-003-03508-4. OCLC 1153338764.
- Joske, Alex (2022). Spies and Lies: How China's Greatest Covert Operations Fooled the World. Hardie Grant Books. ISBN 9781743797990. OCLC 1347020692.
- Joske, Alex (2023). "State security departments: The birth of China's nationwide state security system" (PDF). Deserepi: Studies in Chinese Communist Party External Work.

== See also ==
- Wu Lebao
