= Shouwang Church =

Protestant house church in Beijing

The Shouwang Church (守望教会) is a Protestant house church in Beijing, China, and almost the biggest of about 3,000 of such congregations in the city. The word shouwang means "to keep watch" in Mandarin.

== History and membership ==
The church was founded in 1993 by Jin Tianming, a chemical engineering graduate of Tsinghua University of Korean ethnicity. Since then, the number of its members has increased from 10 to 1,000 as of June 2011.

The services are conducted at members' homes or in rented conference rooms; its other activities include 40 biblical reading groups, choir practice and catechism. Shouwang members typically belong to the middle and upper classes, and include professors, doctors, lawyers, students and Chinese Communist Party members.

== Persecution ==
Like other house churches, the Shouwang Church is subject to harassment by the Chinese authorities, who disapprove of religious groups that are not subject to state control. The church was forced to change headquarters more than 20 times, and was prevented from buying or renting a church building.

Persecution intensified in the context of the general 2011 crackdown on dissidents, following an announcement by church leaders that they would begin holding Sunday service meetings in public, if they were not allowed to acquire premises. As of June 2011, several dozen Shouwang followers are detained every week and forced to sign a disavowal of their spiritual guide before being released, and six church leaders have been placed under house arrest without court documentation. According to the German weekly Die Zeit, Beijing police use around 4,500 officers to provide surveillance of Zhongguancun Square and of the homes of about 500 church members, to prevent the church from congregating.

== See also ==
- Early Rain Covenant Church – a house church in Chengdu, Sichuan, southwestern China
