= 2011 Chinese pro-democracy protests =

Demonstrations in favor of democracy in China

- Jasmine Revolution; Part of the Chinese democracy movement and the impact of the Arab Spring
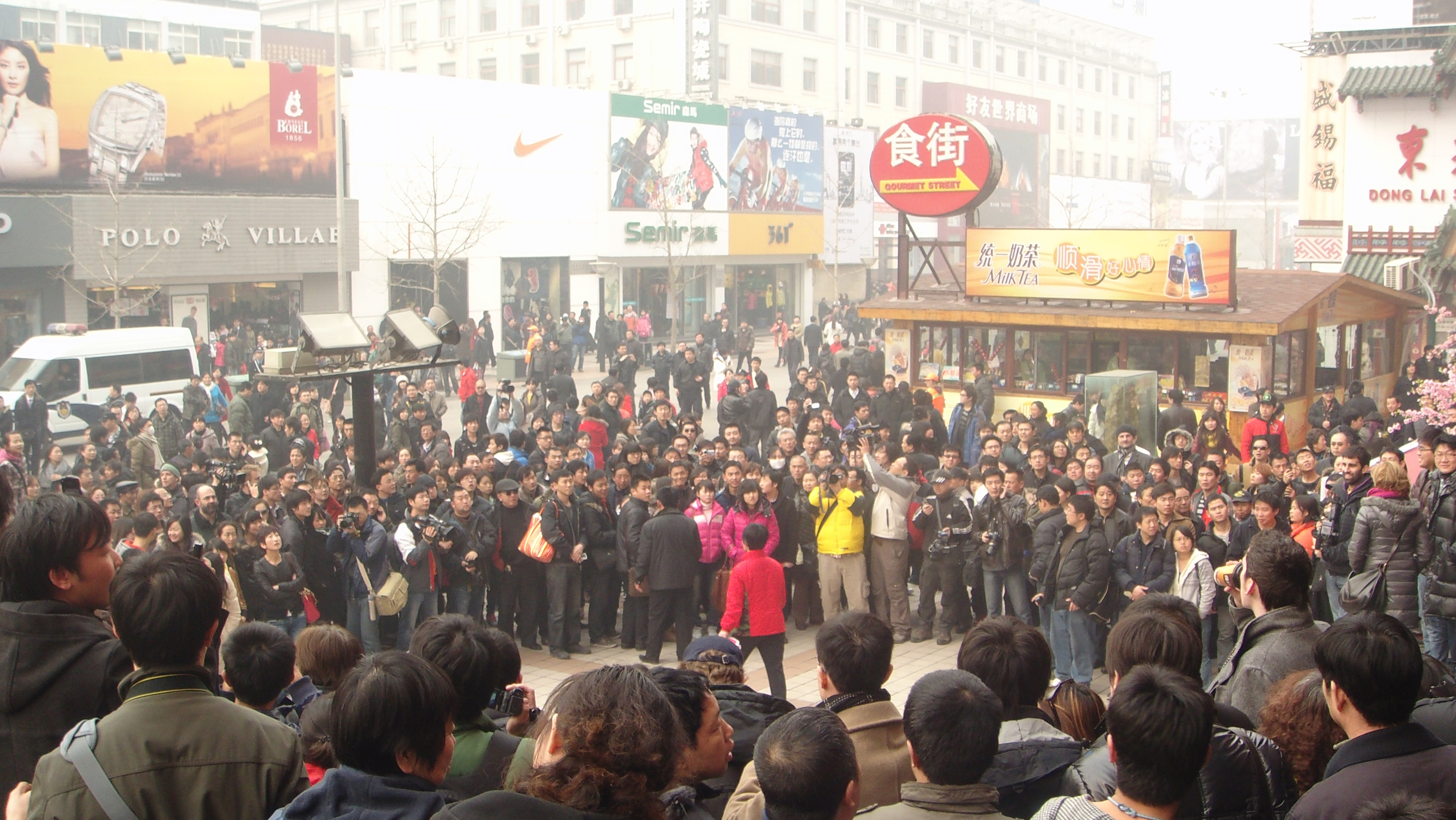
- A large crowd of protesters, journalists, police and spectators gathered in front of a McDonald's restaurant in Wangfujing, Beijing.
- Date: 20 February – 20 March 2011 (1 month)
- Location: China
- Result: Protest failure: Immediate suppression by the government

Parties
(Republic of China (1912–1949)) Pro-democracy protesters; (Republic of China (1912–1949)) Democracy movements of China; Supported by: Pro-democracy camp in Hong Kong; United States; Taiwan-based activist groups	Government of China; Chinese Communist Party; Ministry of Public Security

Number
A few hundred	

Casualties
- Injuries: 4 journalists
- Arrested: 35 dissidents, ~25 journalists

The 2011 Chinese pro-democracy protests, also known as the Greater Chinese Democratic Jasmine Revolution (Chinese: 中国茉莉花活动), refer to public assemblies in over a dozen cities in the People's Republic of China starting on 20 February 2011, inspired by and named after the Jasmine Revolution in Tunisia; the actions that took place at protest sites, and the response by the Chinese government to the calls and action.

Initially, organizers suggested shouting slogans on 20 February. After participants and journalists had been beaten and arrested, organizers urged a change to "strolling" on 27 February to minimize police reactions while sustaining the cycle of actions. On this 2nd protest day, the number of protesters could not be determined. Protest and or official actions were noted in only two out of the thirteen suggested cities, and the difference between protesters and regular strollers became even less clear. Notwithstanding, police mounted a "huge" security operation on both 20 and 27 February. Media sources reported that on 27 February, Stephen Engle of Bloomberg News and Damian Grammaticas of the BBC had been beaten by plainclothes security officers in Beijing. Police arrested protesters. In Shanghai, protesters successfully prevented police from making an arrest and were able to air their slogans with foreign journalists. In the weeks following, about 35 human rights activists and lawyers were arrested and five people were charged with inciting subversion of state power. The protest lasted 2 hours.

== Protest aims ==
=== Initial call ===
The anonymous call for a 'Jasmine revolution' in China's major cities was made online by an overseas group calling themselves "The Initiators and Organizers of the Chinese Jasmine Revolution". The group, whose majority of members were based outside of China, made their calls on the Boxun blog, run by overseas dissidents, and then on Twitter.

The initial call for protest began on 19 February 2011 when 12 to 13 cities were suggested. The Boxun.com appeal called for protests to take place each weekend, arguing that "sustained action will show the Chinese government that its people expect accountability and transparency that doesn't exist under the current one-party system."

City	Province	Location
Beijing	–	McDonald's at Wangfujing
Changchun	Jilin	Culture Square, West Minzhu Street, front door of Corogo supermarket
Changsha	Hunan	Wuyi square, Xinda building front door
Chengdu	Sichuan	Tianfu square, beneath chairman Mao statue
Guangzhou	Guangdong	People's Park Starbucks
Hangzhou	Zhejiang	Wulin square, front door of Hangzhou department store
Harbin	Heilongjiang	Front door of Harbin cinema
Nanjing	Jiangsu	Drum tower square, Xiushui Street, department store front door
Shanghai	–	People's square, front door of Peace Cinema
Shenyang	Liaoning	Nanjing-Bei (North Nanjing) Street, front door of KFC
Tianjin	–	Beneath the Tianjin Drum Tower
Wuhan	Hubei	Liberation road, World trade Square, McDonald's front door
Xi'an	Shaanxi	Beida Street (北大街), front door of Carrefour

=== Protest strategy and tactics ===
Rallying cry

We invite every participant to stroll, watch or even just pretend to pass by. As long as you are present, the authoritarian government will be shaking with fear.

— Open letter 22 Feb. 2011

The slogans of the protest were:

- 我们要食物、我们要工作、我们要住房 (We want food, we want jobs, we want housing)
- 我们要公平、我们要正义 (We want equality, we want justice)
- 启动政治改革、结束一党专政 or 停止一党专政 (Start political reform, end the one-party dictatorship or stop the one-party dictatorship)
- 开放报禁、新闻自由 (Lift the restrictions of the press, press freedom)
- 自由万岁、民主万岁 (Freedom for ten thousand years, democracy for ten thousand years)

On 2 March, organizers declared a three-stage strategy. The first stage would take "a few weeks, a couple of months, a year or even longer"; the second stage would include "holding a jasmine flower and [using] mobile phones or music players to play [the folk song] Such a Beautiful Jasmine". Organizers declared the third stage as "when the street-walking revolution is irreversible"; it would involve people criticizing the government openly and without fear.

The media reported a vindication by protest organizers on 2 March saying, "Now China's government clearly shows its horror and fear of the people, as if facing a deadly enemy. A modest amount of people, just by walking, have demonstrated the people's power, and the government's response has revealed its weaknesses to the world." For 6 March, protesters were urged to "either gather near fast-food restaurants, take a stroll, or eat at the restaurants, ... [and order] set meal No3 at the McDonald's and the KFC".

== February 2011 ==
=== 20 February ===
The Associated Press reported that only "a handful of people" were known to have been actively involved in organizing the staging rallies in 13 cities. The Globe and Mail reported that the 20 February appeal was answered by 200 people at the Beijing rendezvous. There was a similar protest in Shanghai. One demonstrator condemned the government as "a tyranny that suppresses the citizens."

The United States Ambassador to China, Jon Huntsman, Jr., was seen at the protest rendezvous point. Huntsman exchanged a few words with people in Chinese and then his entourage departed the site immediately. Huntsman had previously stood outside a court in Beijing to protest the conviction of an American sentenced on espionage charges, as well as posting a message on Weibo about Internet freedom. US Embassy spokesman Richard Buangan said that Huntsman happened to be passing by a nearby McDonald's and were unaware of the protest. He later condemned the Chinese government for its crackdown on the protests.

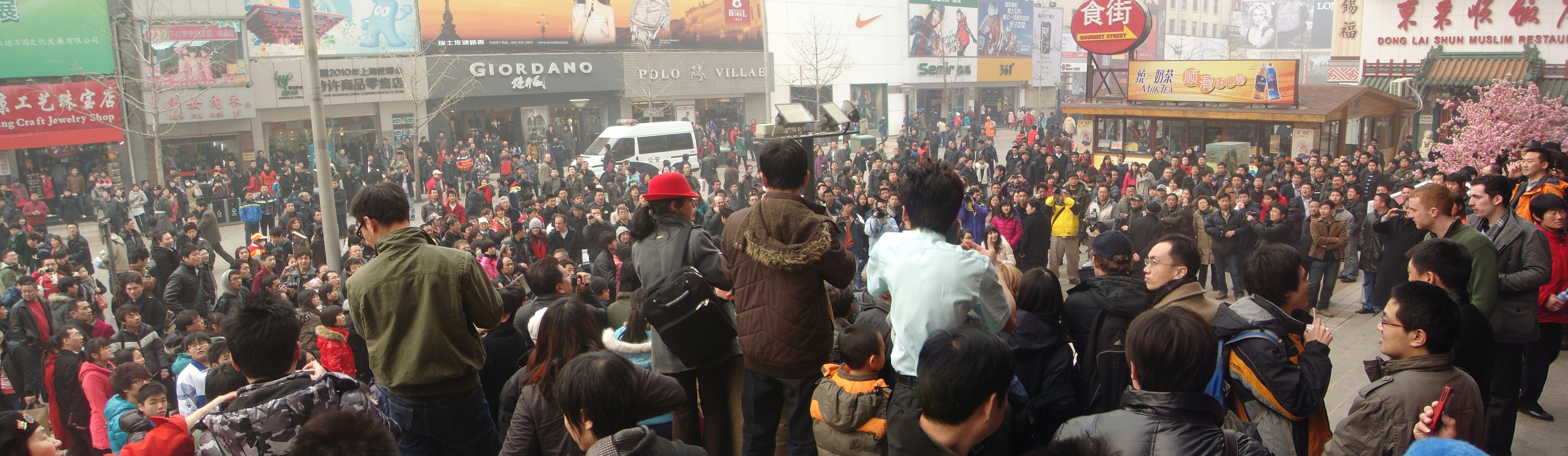
Crowd in front of a McDonald's in Wangfujing on 20 February 2011

=== 27 February ===
After the police responded to the protests on 20 February, the organizers urged the participants not to shout slogans anymore, but simply to stroll silently at the respective protest sites. The call to use "strolling" tactics for the 27 February gatherings was made on the Boxun.com website on 22 February. Prior to the planned 27 February gathering in front of a McDonald's restaurant in Beijing, authorities installed metal corrugated fencing outside the restaurant and outside the home of Nobel laureate and dissident Liu Xiaobo. Hundreds of uniformed and plainclothed security staff and volunteers wearing red armbands were pre-emptively stationed at Wangfujing. Their presence disrupted normal shopping and attracted onlookers. Police began to clear the rendezvous area half an hour after the designated assembly time.

On 27 February, activists in 2 cities—Beijing and Shanghai—out of the 23 originally suggested responded. Seven people were reportedly arrested in Shanghai and police kept reporters, participants, and strollers moving. Since the organizers proposed for protesters to just walk by silently to protest, it was impossible to tell who was protesting and who was just regular strollers on the streets. The Wall Street Journal stated, "while several Chinese people were seen having altercations with the police, there were no signs of actual protests."

==== Beijing ====
Several foreign journalists were physically beaten by the police, with many others physically pushed by the police, their cameras confiscated and footage deleted. The Wall Street Journal gave an eyewitness account of an incident in Beijing in which Bloomberg reporter Stephen Engle was "grabbed by several security officers, pushed to the ground, dragged along by his leg, punched in the head and beaten with a broom handle by a man dressed as street sweeper." The Foreign Correspondents' Club of China denounced the attack on Engle, and called for journalists' physical safety to be guaranteed by the authorities.

BBC reporter Damian Grammaticas accused state security of roughing up his crew. He said that they tried to grab equipment from the cameraman and took him 50 yards away into a police van. Grammaticas alleged the police officers then set on him, pulled him by the hair, and generally treated him roughly. He also alleged that the police officers then threw the crew into a van and threatened them during their transport to a government office.

CNN reporter Eunice Yoon reported that a policeman in Wangfujing knocked a camera out of her colleague Jo Ling Kent's hand and six police officers physically forced them into a bank, where they were detained for half an hour. Yoon remarked after the incident that "there had been no protests for us to cover", and that the incident "show[ed] how incredibly terrified and paranoid the Chinese authorities are". CBS News producer Connie Young was also forcefully carried off by plainclothes police officers and detained after she filmed VOA bureau chief, Stephanie Ho, being wrestled to the ground by plainclothes police officers. Ho was filming when she was quickly attacked and detained by uniformed and plainclothes police officers.

ATV journalists and a TVB cameraman were also reportedly briefly detained. ATV News reported that their footage at the rally site was deleted by officers. Chinese security forces also visited a few Western journalists in their apartments with nighttime visits asking to behave "cooperatively." Otherwise, they warned, the authorities would refuse to extend their work permits at the end of the year.

==== Shanghai ====
In Shanghai on 27 February, protestors prevented police from arresting an elderly man, when they "reacted instantly and angrily, emitting a guttural roar and surging forward almost as one", according to the South China Morning Post. Protestors included elderly people and youths documenting the protest with cameras and phones. Some of the core participants appeared to be "deliberately obstructing police efforts to keep the crowd flowing". Other protestors spoke to foreign journalists and joked to each other about police difficulties in stopping "demonstrations that were not actually happening".

==== Hong Kong ====
27 people participated in a "Jasmine Revolution" demonstration in Hong Kong on 27 February, including activists from the Young Civics, they held placards that read "Long live people's power, long live democracy." 40 more participated in another protest outside the offices of the Central Government Liaison Office in Sheung Wan, for the second time in a week. Participants included Legco member Leung Kwok Hung aka Long Hair and activists from the League of Social Democrats.

== March 2011 ==
=== 6 March ===
Beijing was under tight security due to a session of the National People's Congress, and some 180,000 police and 560,000 security volunteers were already on patrol. There was a heavy police presence on Sunday in parts of Beijing, Shanghai, Guangzhou and Shenzhen to which protests had been called. In Beijing, journalists saw no obvious sign of protesters. Large contingents of plainclothed security personnel were reported in and around Wangfujing, Xidan and Zhongguancun. In Shanghai, most news outlets reported an absence of obvious protestors. However, Deutsche Presse-Agentur (DPA) reported around a hundred protestors "surrounded by hundreds of uniformed and plainclothes police."

There were yet more reports of foreign journalists being detained in Shanghai, leading to sharp objections from the Foreign Ministries of Germany and Australia.

Members of the League of Social Democrats tried to place a branch of jasmine in front of the Central Government Offices in Hong Kong.

=== 13 March ===
According to Deutsche Presse-Agentur, there were several hundred police in the Wangfujing and Xidan districts in Beijing, including uniformed police with dogs, paramilitary police, plainclothes police, special forces units and security guards. More than 40 police were present at the Peace Cinema in Shanghai. According to Agence France-Presse, "there was no massive police presence [at Wangfujing] as seen on previous Sundays."

=== 20 March ===
In Beijing, hundreds of police were present at some of the eight proposed "strolling" protest locations in commercial areas and some police cars were present at entries to some of the 20 university sites proposed for protests.

== Government reaction ==
=== Arrests ===
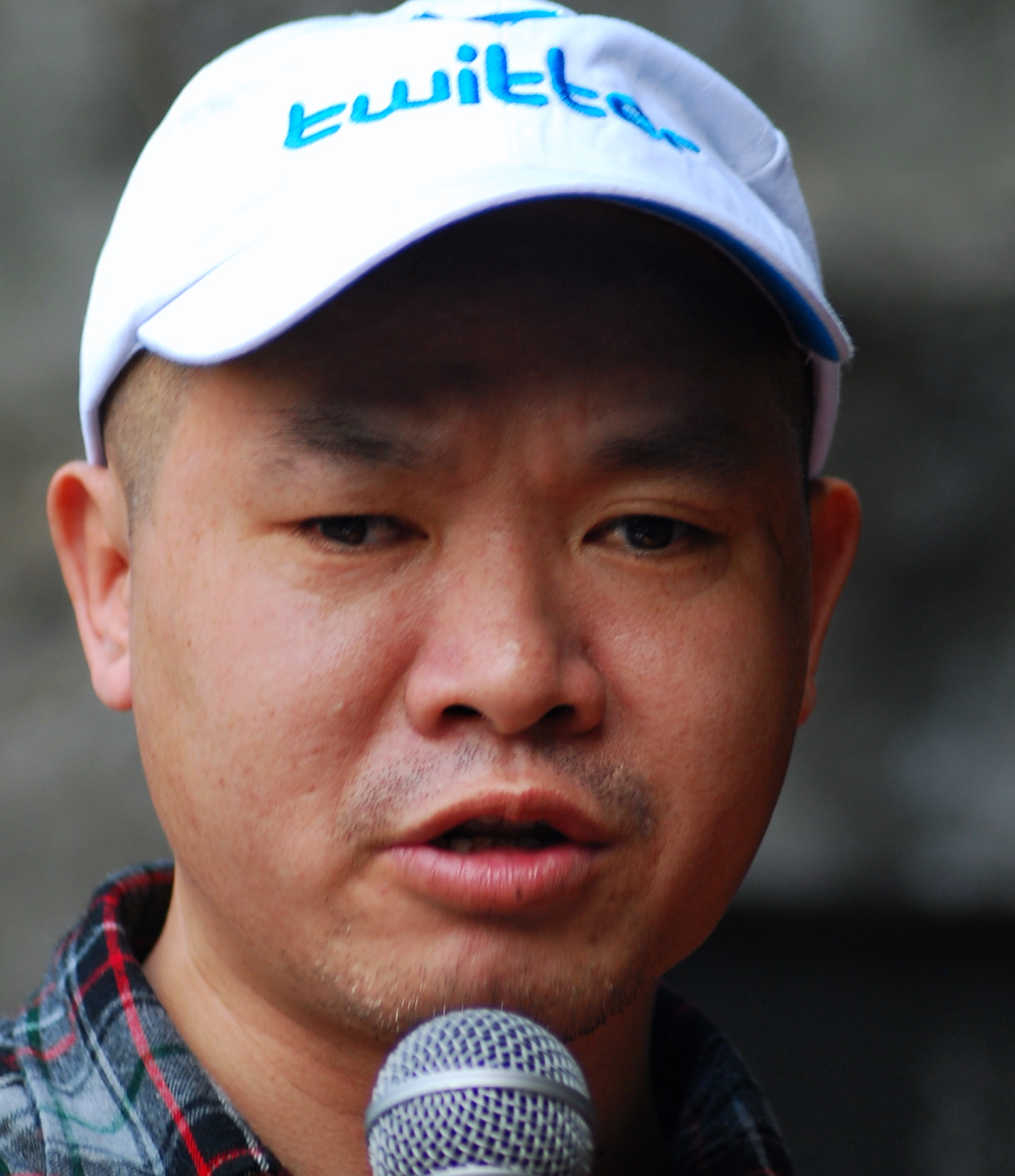
Blogger Ran Yunfei charged with inciting subversion of state power

About 35 leading Chinese activists have been arrested or detained by authorities including a leading Sichuan human rights activist Chen Wei, Tiananmen Square protest student leader, Ding Mao, well-known blogger Ran Yunfei, and Teng Biao of Open Constitutional Initiative. Chengdu-based activist and legal advisor Li Shuangde, who was sentenced to four months in prison on charges of credit card fraud, is considered the first to have been sentenced on "jasmine" related charges. Since the 19 February protest announcement, more than a hundred people have been summoned or questioned by police, and up to 200 people are subject to reinforced supervision or house arrest.

The highest-profile arrest is Ai Weiwei, who was taken into police custody on 3 April in Beijing. Amid Boxun's online campaign, Ai had posted on his Twitter account on 24 February: "I didn't care about jasmine at first, but people who are scared by jasmine sent out information about how harmful jasmine is often, which makes me realize that jasmine is what scares them the most. What a jasmine!" Ai's studio was raided by police, who took away computer equipment; a number of his entourage were also arrested by police. Analysts and other activists said Ai had been widely thought to be untouchable, but Nicholas Bequelin from Human Rights Watch suggested that his arrest, calculated to send the message that no-one would be immune, must have had the approval of someone in the top leadership. The Chinese Ministry of Foreign Affairs said on 7 April that Ai was under investigation for 'economic crimes'.

=== Censorship ===
China Mobile and China Unicom blocked the word "jasmine". Searches for "jasmine" were also blocked on China's largest microblog, Sina Weibo, and status updates with the word on Chinese social networking site Renren were met with an error message and a warning to refrain from postings with "political, sensitive ... or other inappropriate content."

The term for the Two Sessions in Chinese, lianghui, became a covert means of avoiding Internet censorship. When PRC censors attempted to limit news of the Arab Spring by disabling internet searches for Chinese words such as "Egypt," "Tunisia," and "jasmine", protest organizers urged bloggers and activists to call planned protests lianghui instead, a widely used expression in the official news originally pointing to the two conferences "Fourth Session of the Eleventh National People's Congress" and "Fourth Session of the Eleventh CPPCC" happening in March in Beijing. If the government were to censor this dissenters' circumlocution, it would effectively block internet news about the governmental NPC and CPPCC meetings.

On 25 February, several foreign journalists were contacted by police and told that they could not conduct interviews without applying for permission. Regulations issued by the Chinese government forbid entry by foreign reporters into the Wangfujing shopping district in Beijing or the People's Park in central Shanghai without a special permit. Enforcement of the new rules on Sunday 28 February resulted in beating of one camera operator and detention of several reporters for several hours before their release and confiscation of their materials.

Following calls for a "Jasmine Revolution" on Twitter, Chinese users of Twitter began to notice a number of new accounts, sometimes using the names or images of Chinese democracy activists. Tweets by the new accounts took a hostile position to calls for demonstrations.

In late March, Google stated that intermittent problems with Gmail in the PRC constitute "a government blockage carefully designed to look like the problem is with Gmail". PC Mag attributed the blockage to the calls for a "Jasmine Revolution" in the PRC.

=== Other security measures ===
More than 20 Chinese cities stepped up security measures, with armed forces ordered to stand by in case of emergency. CPC General Secretary and President Hu Jintao delivered a speech in the Central Party School on 19 February instructing senior management to better manage social problems and internet incitement.

Chinese artist Ai Weiwei said that there were tight controls on university students to prevent students from participating in protests. He alleged that teachers had received "a certain note ordering them to do their duty, otherwise they will be in trouble, or their school will be in trouble."

=== Jasmine flower ban ===
On 10 May 2011, The New York Times reported that Beijing police had banned the sale of jasmine flowers at various flower markets, causing wholesale prices to collapse. Some vendors stated that Beijing police wanted written assurances that no jasmine flowers would be sold in their stalls. The Guangxi Jasmine Development and Investment Company, organizers of the China International Jasmine Cultural Festival, said that officials canceled the 2011 summer festival.

== Reactions ==
=== Domestic ===
High-level Chinese government official Zhao Qizheng said on 23 February that the probability of China having a "Jasmine Revolution" is "preposterous and unrealistic".

Premier Wen Jiabao participated in a web chat on 27 February that France 24 described as an "apparent bid to defuse" the call for weekly gatherings. In the webchat, he promised to deal with inflation, corruption, lack of housing, property speculation. The Financial Times (FT) claimed that the web chat was "announced abruptly late on [26 February] and appeared to be timed to coincide with the planned protests." It added that with the web chat, "state media blanketed the nation over the internet, television and radio on Sunday morning with two hours of remarks by Wen Jiabao". China News said that the webchat had been planned in advance; similar webchats had taken place on 20 June 2008 and 27 February 2010.

"Political reform offers a guarantee for economic reform. Without political reform, economic reform cannot succeed, and the achievements we have made may be lost," he said yesterday. "It is only with reform that the party and the country will enjoy continuous vigour and vitality."

— Wen Jiabao at NCPCC on 14 March 2011

==== Wu Bangguo's five "No's" ====
Addressing the meeting of the National People's Congress, its chairman Wu Bangguo dismissed any notion of political reform, saying that Western-style democracy would have dire consequences and that any loosening of the Party's hold on power could undermine stability and risk domestic strife, and he also advocated the five "no's"—no multi-party election; no diversified guiding principles, no separation of powers, no federal system, and no privatization.

Wu, who belongs to the conservative faction of the leadership, said: "We have made a solemn declaration that we will not employ a system of multiple parties holding office in rotation; diversify our guiding thought; separate executive, legislative and judicial powers; use a bicameral or federal system; or carry out privatisation." Analysts said the warnings were aimed at consolidating the party's power, in reaction to calls for liberal democracy in Egypt, Tunisia, and Libya. On the other hand, the more liberal Wen Jiabao said that economic and political reform, safeguarding social equity and justice were major factors behind China's success. He also rejected comparisons with Egypt and Tunisia, and reiterated his support for greater democracy and public supervision, saying economic development alone could not solve the problems of the mainland's development.

=== International ===
Time suggested that though there are many similarities between the complaints voiced by the people in Arab Spring and those voiced by the Chinese people, the state's tighter grip on the country's media, Internet and other communication forums pose difficulties for anyone trying to organize mass demonstrations.

The Wall Street Journal said that the online protest appeal could cause concern among Chinese Communist Party leaders, as other uprisings against authoritarian governments elsewhere could impact China.

CNN journalist Eunice Yoon and her news crew headed out to Wangfujing to cover the "response to anonymous calls on the Internet to stage protests and begin a Tunisia-style "Jasmine Revolution" in China", was physically handled by police in Beijing on 27 February at arrival near the protest site. She wrote: "What makes China's treatment of the international press so bewildering is that there had been no protests for us to cover here..... My own experience and those of my colleagues show how incredibly terrified and paranoid the Chinese authorities are of any anti-government movement forming in China."

Following the arrests of approximately 15 foreign journalists on 6 March, The Australian described the attempts at organizing a "Jasmine Revolution" in China as "the biggest showdown between Chinese authorities and foreign media in more than two decades."

The Atlantic reported that Hillary Clinton thinks the Chinese government is "scared" of the Arab rising. "They're worried, and they are trying to stop history, which is a fool's errand. They cannot do it. But they're going to hold it off as long as possible."

=== Taiwan protests ===
On 24 February, whilst visiting Kaohsiung to discuss economic ties between the People's Republic of China and Taiwan (ROC), Chen Yunlin, Chairman of mainland China's Association for Relations Across the Taiwan Straits, was mobbed by about 200 protesters at Kaohsiung Harbor. Some protesters threw chrysanthemum flowers at him (as Jasmine flowers were not in season), while others tried to deliver plastic jasmine flowers and juice to him. Earlier, at Kaohsiung Station, Chen had already encountered two groups of demonstrators, one supporting Taiwanese independence and another Chinese unification. According to police, the groups both numbered about 50 people. About 300 Falun Gong followers also staged a protest. On 8 March, the Democratic Progressive Party released a strongly worded statement condemning the use of force against participants of the "Jasmine Revolution" in China. The statement urged the government to incorporate values of democracy and human rights into agreements with Beijing when promoting cross-strait ties to encourage "China's democratic transformation."

== See also ==
- Arab Spring
- Weiquan movement
- New Citizens' Movement
- Wenzhou train collision
- Wukan protests
- 1989 Tiananmen Square protests and massacre
