= Spies and Lies (Joske book) =

2022 book by Alex Joske

Spies and Lies: How China's Greatest Covert Operations Fooled the World
- Author: Alex Joske
- Cover artist: Josh Durham
- Language: English
- Subject: Chinese Communist Party, Ministry of State Security, United Front Work Department
- Genres: Espionage, geopolitics
- Set in: United States, Canada, Australia and China
- Publisher: Hardie Grant
- Publication date: October 4, 2022
- Publication place: Australia
- Pages: 304
- ISBN: 9781743797990 (Paperback)
- OCLC: 1347020692

Spies and Lies: How China's Greatest Covert Operations Fooled the World is a 2022 book written by Alex Joske which alleges that the west has been negligent of expansive Chinese government influence and foreign espionage efforts. It focuses especially on activities by China's Ministry of State Security (MSS) in the United States. The book was published by Hardie Grant Books and released October 4, 2022. The book has been influential, and its cover includes the endorsement of Representative Mike Gallagher, who months later became the first leader of the Select Committee on the CCP in the United States Congress. Australian Chair of the Center for Strategic and International Studies Charles Edel described the book's method as an "almost forensic" approach to the topic.

== Reception ==
The book was released to favorable reviews in Foreign Affairs, The Wall Street Journal, and The Economist. It has stirred some controversy particularly in its exploration of the MSS' successful cooption of Australian prime minister Bob Hawke to rehabilitate China's image following the 1989 Tiananmen Square protests and massacre.
