= Damian Grammaticas =

British journalist

Damian Grammaticas (born June 1970 in Nairobi) is a Kenyan-born British journalist, working for the BBC.

== Early life and education ==
Of Greek descent, Grammaticas was born in June 1970 and grew up in Kenya.

Having studied at Oundle School and Corpus Christi College, Cambridge, in 1992 Grammaticas graduated with a degree in English literature. He subsequently studied for and obtained a diploma in broadcast journalism at Cardiff University.

== Career ==
In 1994, Grammaticas joined BBC News as a trainee reporter. In the years 1995–1997, his work included reporting for the regional television news programme Look East and for BBC Radio Cambridgeshire. He moved to London in 1998 and reported for BBC World, BBC News 24 and BBC Television News.

Grammaticas subsequently became a foreign correspondent. He became the BBC's Hong Kong correspondent from 2000, covering stories from Hong Kong, China, Taiwan, Korea, Japan, Thailand, Australia and the Philippines. In June 2003, he became the BBC's Moscow correspondent, in 2006 the South Asia correspondent, based in Delhi, and in 2009 the BBC's China correspondent, moving to Beijing. He later reported from Brussels and covered the issue of the United Kingdom leaving the European Union.
