= Chinese Human Rights Defenders =

US-based non-governmental organization

- Type: 501(c)(3) organization
- Tax ID no.: 26-0523708
- Website: Official website

China Human Rights Defenders (CHRD) is a non-governmental organization of domestic and overseas Chinese human rights activists and groups. The organization is headquartered in Washington, DC. Its objective is to provide assistance to both human rights activists and victims of rights abuses, as well as to monitor developments in human rights and rule of law. CHRD supplies grants to Chinese human rights activists, as well as legal training and assistance.

The group issues statements on human rights issues and its website provides news and background information.

On 26 October 2022, the CHRD said of executives going to the Global Financial Leaders' Investment Summit that it "calls on these financial leaders to bring up the deteriorating human rights situation in Hong Kong as a matter of the utmost urgency."

== See also ==
- Human Rights in China (organization)
