= Teng Biao =

Chinese lawyer and activist (born 1973)

- 滕彪
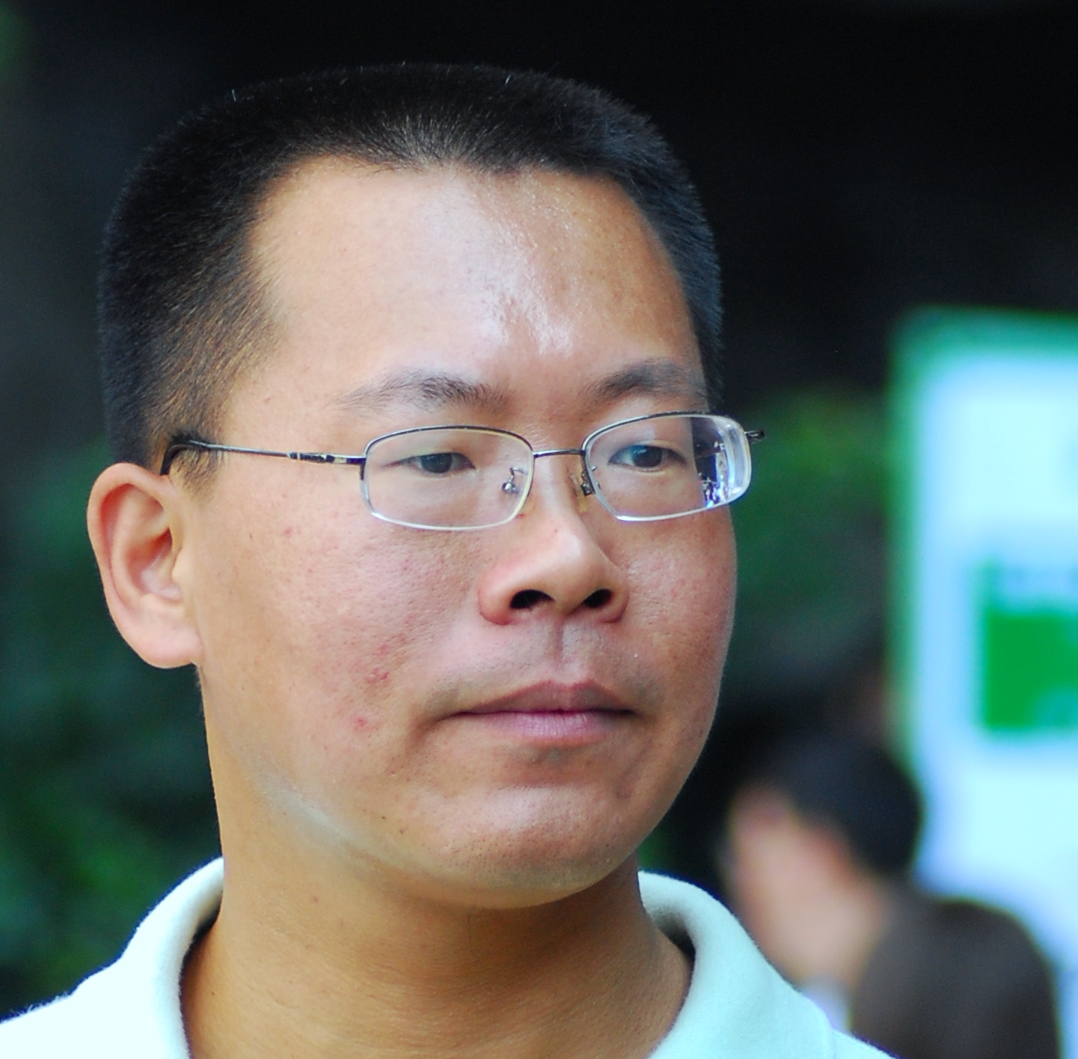
- Teng in 2009
- Born: 2 August 1973 (age 53)
- Education: China University of Political Science and Law
- Occupations: Lawyer, political activist
- Years active: 2007-Present
- Organization: Open Constitution Initiative (Founder)
- Known for: Human rights activism, defence of cases involving freedom of expression, religious freedom against Chinese government persecution promotion of Charter 08
- Movement: Weiquan movement
- Awards: Religious Freedom and Rule of Law Defender Award (2012); Prize for Outstanding Democracy Activist (2011); Human Rights Watch Hellman/Hammett Grants (2010); NED Democracy Award (2008); Human Rights Prize of French Republic (2007)

Teng Biao (Chinese: 滕彪) is a Chinese lawyer and political activist. He is a lecturer at the China University of Political Science and Law in Beijing. He has been a vocal supporter of human rights activists such as Chen Guangcheng and Hu Jia. He has been arrested at least twice, in March 2008 and in February 2011. He was also a visiting scholar at Harvard Law School from (2015–16) and at the Chinese University of Hong Kong.

== Human rights activities in China ==
Teng is one of the founders of the Open Constitution Initiative in 2003. He is also one of the 25 leading figures on the Information and Democracy Commission launched by Reporters Without Borders.

In 2006, he was counsel for the blind civil rights activist Chen Guangcheng, who was sentenced to four years and three months in prison.

=== Arrests ===
On 7 March 2008, Teng was arrested by the Beijing Public Security Bureau and detained for two days.

In 2011, Teng met with other lawyers on 16 February to talk about the case of Chen Guangcheng, who was placed under house arrest after his release from prison. His fellow lawyers Jiang Tianyong and Tang Jitian, who attended the meeting, were arrested soon after. Teng was arrested on 20 February, the first Sunday of the 2011 Chinese pro-democracy protests that were inspired by the Arab Spring. On 28 February 2011, Amnesty International launched an "urgent action" in support of the three detained lawyers. Teng was released on 29 April, after more than two months of detention. Human rights organisations state that "He remains under surveillance".

== Work in the United States ==
=== Academia ===
Teng is a scholar at Hunter College.

=== Harassment ===
From 2017 to 2018, Teng suffered a series of personal attacks from Chinese businessman Guo Wengui. Teng wrote an article afterwards to refute the related slander and rumors, and commented on the performance and impact of the "Guo Wengui incident".

In December 2020, a group of Chinese protestors picketed Teng's home in New Jersey, accusing him of conspiring with the Chinese government. Teng and other dissidents said the protests were organized by Guo Wengui, whom they have previously publicly criticized.

=== Sexual harassment allegation ===
In 2023, Teng Biao posted an apology on Twitter for sexual harassment of a woman. The woman disagreed with his apology and said that it was attempted rape, which Teng Biao denied.

== Awards ==
- Religious Freedom and Rule of Law Defender Award (2012)
- Prize for Outstanding Democracy Activist (2011)
- Human Rights Watch Hellman/Hammett Grants (2010)
- NED Democracy Award (2008)
- Human Rights Prize of French Republic (2007)

== See also ==
- Human rights in the People's Republic of China
- Weiquan movement
