= Jiang Tianyong =

Chinese human rights lawyer

- 江天勇
- Born: 1971 (age 54–55); Henan
- Occupation: Attorney
- Known for: Human rights advocacy
- Spouse: Jin Bianling

Jiang Tianyong (Chinese: 江天勇) is a human rights lawyer in the People's Republic of China. Based in Beijing, he is a prominent figure in the Weiquan (rights defending) movement, and has defended Tibetans, petitioners, Falun Gong adherents, HIV/AIDS victims, and other vulnerable groups. Jiang's human rights advocacy has drawn the ire of Chinese authorities; his applications for renewal of his legal license have been denied, and he has been detained on multiple occasions.

== Advocacy ==
Jiang was born in Luoshan, Henan province, where he worked as a teacher from 1995 to 2004. In 2004 year, he left his job as a teacher, relocated to Beijing, and become a human rights lawyer. He passed the bar exam in 2005, and became a partner in the Beijing Global Lawfirm, along with several other prominent human rights lawyers. He has taken on a number of politically sensitive cases, including those of petitioners and religious and ethnic minorities. In 2008, Jiang offered to provide legal services to Tibetans facing charges in the aftermath of the 2008 Tibetan unrest, and was involved in the high-profile defense of a Tibetan cleric, along with lawyer Li Fangping. Jiang began advocating for Falun Gong adherents in 2008, and by late 2009 said he had defended nearly 20 practitioners who had been detained for their spiritual practice. Jiang has also advocated on behalf of citizens who contracted HIV/AIDS in tainted blood transfusions or donations, and was involved in advocating for victims of the Shanxi "black brick kiln" case.

== Detentions ==
Jiang has been detained on multiple occasions by Chinese security agents in response to his human rights advocacy. In 2008, Jiang was informed that his license to practice law had expired. In 2009, he was one of at least 17 Weiquan lawyers whose application for renewal of a legal license was rejected. The same year, Jiang was put under police surveillance, and was prevented from leaving his home.

On 19 February 2011, he was one of several lawyers and dissidents detained as part of a sweeping crackdown on dissent. Jiang was held in custody for two months. In an interview with the South China Morning Post, Jiang said he was beaten and abused in custody. While in the detention center, interrogators reportedly kicked and punched Jiang repeatedly, and forced him to sit motionless for up to 15 hours at a stretch.

In November 2016, Jiang was feared to be in custody again, according to his wife. On December 6, Philip Alston, the UN's special rapporteur on extreme poverty and human rights, said Jiang's disappearance was in reprisal for his cooperation with the UN during Alston's visit to China. Jiang was sentenced in 2017 to two years in prison for "inciting subversion of state power".

He was released in 2019, and reported to be living with his family in central China, under close watch from Chinese authorities.

In May 2021, Radio Free Asia reported that Jiang remained under house arrest.
