= Charter 08 =

2008 Chinese dissident manifesto

- Simplified Chinese: 零八宪章
- Traditional Chinese: 零八憲章
Transcriptions
Standard Mandarin
- Hanyu Pinyin: Língbā Xiànzhāng
Yue: Cantonese
- Jyutping: ling4 baat3 hin3 zoeng1

Charter 08 is a manifesto initially signed by 303 Chinese dissident intellectuals and human rights activists. It was published on 10 December 2008, the 60th anniversary of the Universal Declaration of Human Rights, adopting its name and style from the anti-Soviet Charter 77 issued by dissidents in Czechoslovakia. Since its release, more than 10,000 people inside and outside China have signed the charter. After unsuccessful reform efforts in 1989 and 1998 by the Chinese democracy movement, Charter 08 was the first challenge to one-party rule that declared the end of one-party rule to be its goal; it has been described as the first one with a unified strategy.

In 2009, one of the authors of Charter 08, Liu Xiaobo, was sentenced to eleven years' imprisonment for "inciting subversion of state power" because of his involvement. A year later, Liu was awarded the 2010 Nobel Peace Prize by the Norwegian Nobel Committee. In 2017, he was granted medical parole and died shortly after of terminal liver cancer.

== Demands ==
Many of the original signatories were prominent Chinese citizens inside and outside the government, including lawyers; a Tibetan poet and essayist, Woeser; and Bao Tong, a former senior Chinese Communist Party official, who all faced a risk of arrest and jail. The Charter calls for 19 changes including an independent legal system, freedom of association, the elimination of one-party rule and privatization of all enterprises and farm land. "All kinds of social conflicts have constantly accumulated and feelings of discontent have risen consistently," it reads. "The current system has become backward to the point that change cannot be avoided." China remains the only large world power to still retain an authoritarian system that so infringes on human rights, it states. "This situation must change! Political democratic reforms cannot be delayed any longer!"

Specific demands are:

1. Amending the Constitution.
2. Separation of powers.
3. Legislative democracy.
4. Judicial independence.
5. Public control of public servants.
6. Guarantee of human rights.
7. Election of public officials.
8. Abolition of the hukou system.
9. Freedom of association.
10. Freedom of assembly.
11. Freedom of expression.
12. Freedom of religion.
13. Civic education.
14. Protection of property.
15. Financial and tax reform.
16. Social security.
17. Protection of the environment.
18. A federated republic.
19. Truth in reconciliation.

The opening paragraph of the charter states:

This year is the 100th year of China's Constitution, the 60th anniversary of the Universal Declaration of Human Rights, the 30th anniversary of the birth of the Democracy Wall, and the 10th year since China signed the International Covenant on Civil and Political Rights. After experiencing a prolonged period of human rights disasters and a tortuous struggle and resistance, the awakening Chinese citizens are increasingly and more clearly recognizing that freedom, equality, and human rights are universal common values shared by all humankind, and that democracy, a republic, and constitutionalism constitute the basic structural framework of modern governance. A "modernization" bereft of these universal values and this basic political framework is a disastrous process that deprives humans of their rights, corrodes human nature, and destroys human dignity. Where will China head in the 21st century? Continue a "modernization" under this kind of authoritarian rule? Or recognize universal values, assimilate into the mainstream civilization, and build a democratic political system? This is a major decision that cannot be avoided.

== Response ==
=== China ===
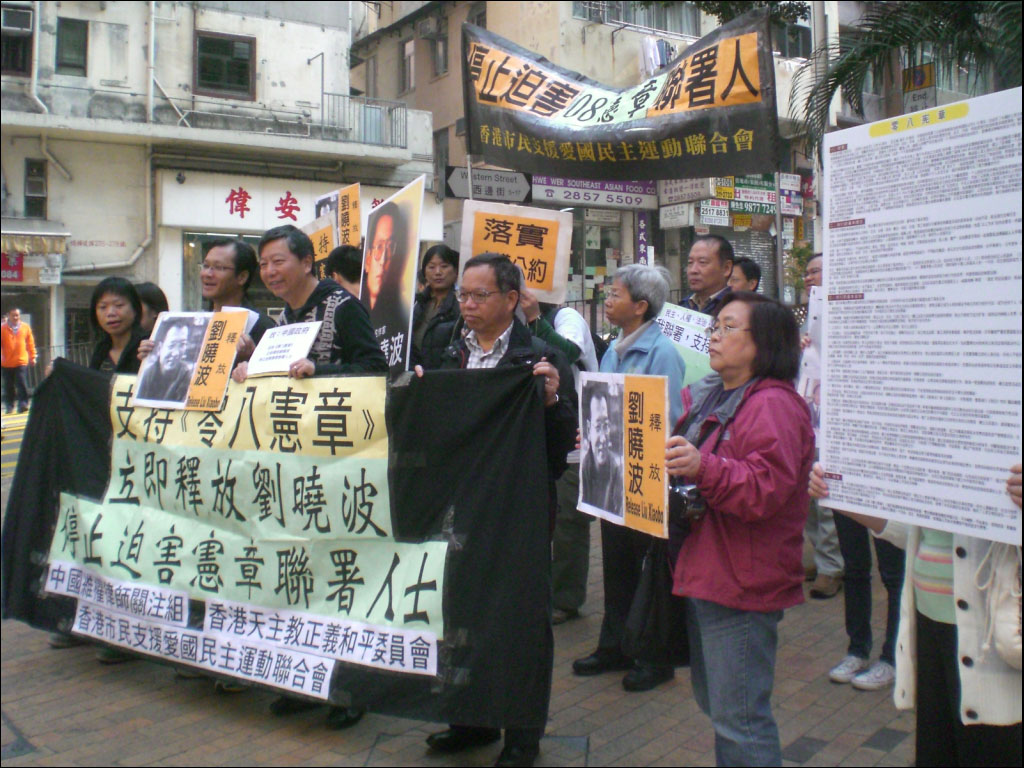
Protest in Hong Kong against the arrest of Liu Xiaobo

The Chinese government has said little publicly about the Charter. On 8 December 2008, two days before the 60th anniversary of the United Nations General Assembly's adoption of the Universal Declaration of Human Rights, Liu Xiaobo was detained by police, hours before the online release of the Charter. He was detained and later arrested on 23 June 2009, on charges of "suspicion of inciting the subversion of state power." Several Nobel Laureates wrote a letter to President Hu Jintao asking for his release; in response, the Chinese government suppressed them: at least 70 of its 303 original signatories were summoned or interrogated by police while domestic media were forbidden to interview anyone who signed the document. Police also searched for or questioned a journalist, Li Datong, and two lawyers, though none were arrested. State media was banned from reporting on the manifesto. A blogging website popular with activists, bullog.cn, which may have had ties to the Charter, was shut down. On 25 December 2009, Liu Xiaobo was sentenced to 11 years in prison for "inciting subversion of state power" activities by the court. On 8 October 2010, he was awarded the Nobel Peace Prize "for his long and non-violent struggle for fundamental human rights in China".

=== Outside of China ===
A number of governments, including those of the United States and Germany, as well as the opposition in Taiwan, have condemned the harassment of supporters of Charter 08 as well as hailing the Charter. Western press has generally covered the Charter positively, and international NGOs have supported its message. David Stanway reported in The Guardian that it "has been hailed as the most significant act of public dissent against China's Communist party since the Tiananmen Square pro-democracy protests were brutally crushed in 1989." Other international figures, including the Dalai Lama, have also voiced their support and admiration of the Charter. There were also protests in Hong Kong demanding the release of Liu Xiaobo and other signatories. The organization that Liu led to pursue Charter 8, received financial support from the US government's National Endowment for Democracy.

== Selected signatories and supporters ==
=== Original signatories ===
- Bao Tong
- Dai Qing
- Ding Zilin
- Liu Junning
- Liu Xiaobo
- Mao Yushi
- Pu Zhiqiang
- Ran Yunfei
- Sha Yexin
- Tsering Woeser

=== Later supporters ===
- Fang Lizhi
- Ha Jin
- He Weifang
- Su Xiaokang
- Wang Dan
- Yu Ying-shih

== See also ==
- Charter 77 (Czechoslovakia)
- Charter 97 (Belarus)
- Human rights in the People's Republic of China
- Law of the People's Republic of China
- Fifth Modernization (Wei Jingsheng)
