= Inciting subversion of state power =

Crime in the People's Republic of China

Inciting subversion of state power (Chinese: 煽动颠覆国家政权罪; pinyin: Shāndòng diānfù guójiā zhèngquán zuì) is a crime under the law of the People's Republic of China. It is article 105, paragraph 2 of the 1997 revision of the Criminal Law of the People's Republic of China.

The "inciting subversion" crime is related to earlier Chinese laws criminalizing activities deemed "counterrevolutionary"; as was the case with its predecessor, the charge is wielded by the government as an instrument of political repression. The Chinese government frequently uses "inciting subversion of state power" as a "catch-all" charge used to target and imprison political activists, foreign intelligence agents, human rights campaigners and dissidents. In 2009, prominent dissident and Nobel Peace Prize laureate Liu Xiaobo was sentenced to 11 years in prison for "inciting subversion of state power" based on his drafting of the Charter 08 manifesto calling for political reform. A 2008 report by the Chinese Human Rights Defenders (CHRD) website lists 34 people convicted under this law, many of them for having posted articles on the internet that were critical of the government. The Chinese authorities have used the charge against Chinese human rights lawyers and activists in the 709 crackdown, which began in 2015. In 2019, Zhen Jianghua, a human rights activist and anti-censorship campaigner, was sentenced to two years in prison for "inciting subversion of state power"; later the same year, Wang Yi, the pastor of the Early Rain Covenant Church, a Chengdu-based house church (congregation operating outside of government control), was convicted and sentenced to nine years in prison in charges of "illegal business operation" and inciting subversion of state power.

Gao Mingxuan, one of the editors of the 1980 Criminal Code of the People's Republic of China, defended on the application of the law in the Liu Xiaobo case, contending that the laws are not greatly different from similar ones in other countries and that each country sets limitations on freedom of speech, such as England's Treason Act 1351 (last used to prosecute William Joyce in 1945 for collaborating with Germany in World War II) and Germany's Strafgesetzbuch § 90b, and 18 U.S.C. §§ 2383–2385.

== Text of the law ==
Article 105, Paragraph 2, 1997 Criminal Code of the People's Republic of China (translation by Wei Luo):

"Anyone who uses rumour, slander or other means to encourage subversion of the political power of the State or to overthrow the socialist system, shall be sentenced to fixed-term imprisonment of not more than five years. However, the ringleaders and anyone whose crime is monstrous shall be sentenced to fixed-term imprisonment of not less than five years."

== 1997 UN report ==
The United Nations' Working Group on Arbitrary Detention reported on the new law in its 1997 country visit to China, predicting that the vague language of the law would enable it to be used against the "communication of thoughts or ideas". A quote from the report:

45. Article 105 is yet another example of a broad and imprecise definition liable to be both misapplied and misused. The article defines the offence it covers as "organizing, scheming and acting to subvert the political power of the State and overthrow the socialist system" and "incitement to subvert the political power of the State and overthrow the socialist system by means of spreading rumours, slander or other means". The concept of "other means" is open to very broad interpretation.

46. Under Article 105, even communication of thoughts and ideas or, for that matter, opinions, without intent to commit any violent or criminal act, may be regarded as subversion. Ordinarily, an act of subversion requires more than mere communication of thoughts and ideas.

== See also ==
- List of Chinese dissidents
- Law of the People's Republic of China
- Human rights in China
- List of political offences that attract jail terms in China
- Picking quarrels and provoking trouble
- Anti-Soviet agitation
