= Theory Conference, January-April 1979 =

Chinese Communist Party conference

The Theory Conference of 1979 was a gathering of Chinese Communist Party cadres and theoreticians that took place between December 18 and December 22, 1978, at the 3rd Plenary Session of the 11th Central Committee of the Chinese Communist Party, during which Deng Xiaoping’s leadership was officially consolidated and Hu Yaobang was elevated to the Politburo. This session confirmed the reform agenda of the CCP. Hu was tasked with arranging a theoretical conference to revise the CCP's ideology and lay the intellectual groundwork for the Four Modernisations goal and economic reform.

== Background ==
With the end of the Cultural Revolution in 1976 upon Mao Zedong’s death and the purge of the Gang of Four, there occurred a widespread political and social reaction to the violent and destructive excesses of Maoism. Deng Xiaoping, having secured rehabilitation in 1975, further consolidated his position, assuming paramount leadership in December 1978, but not before he had the chance to elevate his protege Yaobang in May of that year. Yaobang pursued a series of political and economic reforms as Deng Xiaoping’s ‘right-hand man’, making enemies of conservatives in the Party.

Simultaneously, with the return of national examinations and the reopening of schools and universities, intellectuals reasserted themselves as a distinct stratum of Chinese society and were strongly supportive of the reform campaign carried out by Xiaoping, Yaobang, and Zhao Zhiyang. Many of these intellectuals were influenced by reform movements in the Eastern Bloc, in Yugoslavia, Hungary, and Poland. Hu Yaobang cultivated a reformist, democratically minded intellectual network, which expressed itself in the official publication of the China Youth League, China Youth, of which Yaobang was its most powerful patron. In it, young cadres demanded that “democracy be brought into full play”, blaming the Cultural Revolution on “the absence of reliable organisations and systems to safeguard socialist democracy”. This was the intellectual climate, of reformist optimism and rejection of Maoism, into which the Theory Conference of January 1979 steps. Many intellectuals viewed Deng and Yaobang as fulfilling the promise of 1949 which the extremism of Mao and the Red Guards had wrecked.

== Attendees ==
Advised by Yu Guangyuan, an official of the Propaganda Department prominent in the Hundred Flowers Campaign for his criticism of Lysenkoism, Yaobang selected five chairmen for the conference.

These were, in order:

- Hu Jiwei, editor-in-chief of People’s Daily
- Zhou Yang,
- Wu Jiang,
- Yu Guangyuan
- Tong Dalin (initially Yaobang asked Deng Liqun to be chairman, but Deng declined the invitation.)

The five chairmen then each chose 10 participants who in turn each chose 15 more participants, totalling about 200 participants. The reformist camp aligned with Hu Yaobang was represented by a strong, if not outright dominant, contingent. Conservative intellectuals like Hu Qiaomu and Deng Liqun were also present, as were Hu Sheng, Lin Mohan and Liu Baiyu.

== Structure ==
The conference was structured around a series of speeches, discussion groups and proposals.

=== Yaobang’s Opening Speech ===
Hu Yaobang’s opening speech addressed the importance of adapting ideological and theoretical work to the changing needs of the Party and society, fostering open dialogue and protecting ideological plurality. He began his speech by highlighting the need for radical reform and organisational investigations after defeating the Gang of Four. His speech summarised the achievements and lessons of the ideological and theoretical battle, united the masses based on Marxism-Leninism and Mao Zedong Thought, and discussed the emerging tasks of ideology and theory work as the Party’s focus shifted. Hu praised ground-breaking comrades who closely connected with the masses but also identified the ideological challenges posed by those with rigid ideologies hindering progressive thinking. Blaming the neglect of practical experience and the masses, Hu advocated “seeking truth from facts” which emphasised the importance of integrating theory with work in adapting to the shifting focus of the Party towards the Four Modernisations. He also highlighted the need to clear ideological obstacles and research new problems emerging during the transformation. The conditions Hu specified for advancement of theoretical and propaganda work included an in-depth study of Marxist-Leninist and Mao Zedong’s ideologies, maintaining the integration of theory and practice as well as promoting open dialogue and democratic exchange of ideas. To further advance theoretical work, Hu suggested the creation of weighty theoretical articles and monographs. He called for a balanced approach to democratic individualism and stressed the need to avoid hasty arrests, criticism, or persecution of individuals. His speech attempted to set an open and revisionist tone to the conference, as to encourage participants to criticise and theorise more freely.

=== Moderate Democratic Elites and Activists ===
Among the reform supporters, there were a group of democratic elites and activists who demanded not only economic and social reform, but also democratisation and political reform. Yan Jiaqi and Li Honglin both proposed the idea of limited terms of office for political leaders. Yan delivered a speech and published an article titled "Democracy Examined," regarding the criticism of lifelong tenure for top Party and government leaders. He argued that such a system could potentially lead to a personalist dictatorship or even a monarchy, which would eventually face overthrow. Li agreed with Yan's perspective but also emphasised the importance of government accountability to the people.

Guo Luo Ji was a democratic elite who gained recognition for his historic vote against the election of Kang Sheng's wife, Cao Yiou, as deputy to the National People's Congress. This marked the first instance of a negative vote at any provincial or municipal people's congress. Guo also authored an article titled "Political Issues Can Be Discussed" and another piece in People's Daily, where he demanded freedom of speech and thinking.

Su Shaozhi and Feng Wanrui argued that China's complete state ownership indicated a stagnation in the phase of "undeveloped socialism" (bu fada de shehui zhuyi). They contended that there was a lack of understanding of socialism in China, impacting its practical implementation and policy formulation. Their critique of the Mao era, particularly its economic policies, contributed significantly to garnering support for shifts toward a market-oriented economy in China.

=== Radical Liberal Intellectuals ===
Zhang Xianyang, a radical liberal philosopher, displayed one of the most controversial speeches of the conference. His speech demonstrated a critique of totalitarianism and its manifestations within the Cultural Revolution through Mao's policies. Zhang made frequent historical references in his speech, for example, in 1977, Zhang related the Gang of Four's “fascist dictatorship” to the praxis of the Anti-rightist Campaign of 1957, led by Xiaoping. He particularly attacked the “taboo” that developed in China of avoid condemning the leftist deviation but only focusing only on criticism from the right. He believed that this perspective had "shackled" the Chinese populace, with anti-right rhetoric dominating political and public discourse. The 1981 resolution eventually acknowledged the shortcomings of the Cultural Revolution, describing it as a “comprehensive, long-drawn-out and grave blunder” that prevented the PRC from “scoring the greater achievements of which we should have been capable.”

Wang Ruoshui's speech at the conference was considered too radical to also be included in the Resolution of 1981. The speech highlighted the Cultural Revolution as a ‘gigantic catastrophe’ for the state, also drawing upon the anti-rightist campaigns to show the unwillingness of intellectuals to speak out against the regime. The speech echoes that of Zhang Xianyang's concerns, emphasizing the limitations imposed by a lack of political expression and the conformity it imposed on Chinese society.

=== Deng Xiaoping's Speech ===
When Deng assumed party leadership in 1978, he focused on rectifying the errors of the Cultural Revolution and restoring political, economic, and social order during the Boluan Fanzheng period. While he aligned with reform proponents, Deng staunchly opposed Western democratic ideals advocated by certain democratic leaders. He steadfastly supported the practice of democratic centralism and communism. In his closing speech of the conference, he established the Four Cardinal Principles which were designed to underscore the belief in the supremacy of Lenin's one-party state and consolidate the Communist Party's dictatorship, ensuring it had absolute and exclusive power for effective governance. He also intended to curb the growing burgeoning discourse and rising support for the Western democratic model during the conference since he considered the Western multi-party system and universal suffrage highly detrimental to one-party rule. Deng's speech and principles aimed to silence dissenting ideological voices and set the stage for the country's subsequent reform and opening up policies.

== Criticism ==
Deng Xiaoping's ascension to paramount leader in December 1978 during the third plenary session unravelled the unity between his liberal and conservative reformist supporters. The conference provided the first ideological battleground between Hu Yaobang's liberal intellectuals and the conservative faction, headed by CASS President and Vice Presidents, Hu Qiaomu and Deng Liqun. Conservatives believed the bourgeoisie threatened China's socialist modernisation and they were not very present during the first half of the conference. Liqun had turned down a co-chair position and was frustrated by Xiaoping's support for Yaobang.

However, the conference's spring break coincided with a crackdown on democratic activists participating in the Democracy Wall protests. Deng Xiaoping was concerned by its abolitionist elements and questioning of the progress of the Sino-Vietnam war. The crackdown reinvigorated conservative theorists, who used the spring break to attack the liberal theorists. Qiaomu, a former personal secretary to Mao, attempted to link the democracy movement to Yaobang and accused his rival of enabling the conference's radical element at the conference. He personally warned Xiaoping of the danger posed by the anti-Maoist and anti-party sentiments of some participants. As a result, after the break, the conference's participants expanded to become increasingly dominated by conservatives and party officials.^{1} In a reversal, Yaobang's supporters now had a minimal presence at the conference. The conservative faction drew on Xiaoping's fears of a mass movement beyond his control to weaken his support for Yaobang's conception of reform.^{1} Hence, the conservatives increased their sway with Xiaoping and Qiaomu became instrumental in crafting Deng's speech on the ‘four cardinal principles’. Additionally, a few outspoken participants, namely Professor Guo Luoji, were punished post-conference for their comments. This conservative victory would foreshadow future clashes over the next decade.

== Legacy ==
The discussions during the 1979 Theory Conference and subsequent debates emphasised the importance of political and economic reform for China's modernisation. The introduction of socialist democracy, rule of law, and human rights was seen as necessary to achieve a stable political situation and a vibrant economy. Its aftermath led to a brief period of intellectual freedom and dissent in China. Intellectuals, including participants in the conference, released criticism against the ‘ultra-leftist’ policies of the past and the apparent lack of democracy in China's political system. They criticised the concentration of power within the Party and expressed concerns about the lack of a strong legal system. They believed that academic freedom was dependent on a democratic system and that intellectuals should be able to propose and advise on social and economic policies. As a result, this period witnessed a growing emphasis on the promotion of citizens’ personal and democratic rights. The conference further marked the beginning of a power struggle between the progressive intellectual elites, led by figures including Hu Yaobang, and the conservative revolutionary elders. The conflict revolved around power as well as what direction China should take - whether to revert to a pre-Cultural Revolution model, adopt a modified form, or embrace fundamental institutional and ideological changes. It culminated in the revolution and massacre of 1989 at Tiananmen Square, triggered by Yaobang's death. Overall, the legacy of the Theory Conference can be seen through the continuation of ideas advocated by intellectuals and reformers, leading to political changes in the following decades, despite periodic crackdowns and suppressions.
