= List of campaigns of the Chinese Communist Party =

This is a list of political campaigns of the Chinese Communist Party (CCP) since its founding in 1921.

== List of campaigns ==
Period	Year	Campaign	Native names (Simplified / Traditional, if applicable)	Descriptions	Number of deaths	Source
Chinese Soviet Republic	1930–1931	Anti-Bolshevik League incident	打AB团 / 打AB團	A political purge in Chinese Communist Party (CCP) bases in Jiangxi province, during which Mao Zedong accused rivals of belonging to the Kuomintang intelligence agency "Anti-Bolshevik League." The campaign resulted in the trial and execution of large numbers of Red Army officers and soldiers.		
Yan'an Soviet	1941–1945	Yan'an Rectification Movement	延安整风 / 延安整風	An ideological rectification campaign that took place at the CCP base in Yan'an, following completion of the Long March. Through the campaign, Mao consolidated his role as the CCP's paramount leader, and established Marxist–Leninism and Mao Zedong Thought as the Party's guiding ideologies. The campaign was notable for its role in unifying and strengthening the CCP, as well as for the methods of Soviet-inspired thought reform it helped standardize, including the use of self-criticism and "struggle."		
Yan'an Soviet	1947–1952	Land Reform Movement	土地改革	The first of many Land reform campaigns, it saw the land in rural China forcibly taken from landlords and redistributed among peasants. The campaign was notable in that, unlike under Soviet practice wherein the security apparatus redistributed land and punished landlords, the people themselves were encouraged to overthrow landlords.		
Mao Zedong	1950–1953	Campaign to Suppress Counterrevolutionaries	镇反 / 鎮反	The first political campaign launched after the founding of the People's Republic of China, the Campaign to Suppress Counterrevolutionaries aimed to consolidate Communist Party authority and suppress residual opposition, including former Kuomintang supporters and functionaries, businessmen, and intellectuals. Those accused of being counterrevolutionaries were denounced in mass trials; many were sentenced to forced labor or condemned to be executed. Between 700,000 and 2 million are estimated to have been killed in the campaign.	700,000 to 2 million	
Mao Zedong	1950–1955	New Marriage Law	新婚姻法	A marriage law mandating that marriages be registered through state institutions, and raising the marriageable age to 20 for males and 18 for females.		
Mao Zedong	1950–1956	Combat Illiteracy Campaign	扫盲运动	Focus on raising literacy rates from 15 to 25% in 1950.		
Mao Zedong	1951–1952	Three-Anti/Five-Anti campaigns	三反五反	The Three-Anti (1951) and Five-Anti campaigns (1952) were urban reform movements targeting capitalists and business owners. They ostensibly aimed to root out corruption, embezzlement, waste, though they also served to purge opposition to the new Communist government.		
Mao Zedong	1951–1953	Withdraw from the sects movements	退道运动 / 退道運動	A campaign to denounce and suppress secret societies and religious organizations that were viewed as a potential threat to the CCP's authority		
Mao Zedong	1953	New Three-Anti Campaign	新三反			
Mao Zedong	1955	Sufan movement	肃反 / 肅反	A political purge of "hidden counterrevolutionaries," including intellectuals, particularly within the military and political establishment. The People's Daily announced that 10 percent of Communist Party members were secretly traitors. Estimates vary on the number of individuals affected. On the conservative end, one source says 81,000 individuals were arrested, while another says 770,000 were killed in the campaign.	770,000	
Mao Zedong	1956–1957	Hundred Flowers Campaign	百花运动 / 百花運動	The Hundred Flowers Campaign was a brief period in which intellectuals and others were encouraged to offer diverse views and criticisms on matters of national policy under the slogan "letting a hundred flowers blossom and a hundred schools of thought contend." When the criticism began targeting Mao Zedong and Communist rule, the movement was suppressed, and many of its participants were punished. The ideological crackdown following the campaign's failure re-imposed Maoist orthodoxy in public expression, and catalyzed the Anti-Rightist Movement.		
Mao Zedong	1956	Public-Private Partnership	公私合营	The "State Council" Provisions on Several Major Issues in Estimating Property Clearance When Private Enterprises Implement Public-Private Partnerships, which involves machinery, houses, mineral deposits, finished products, raw materials, provident funds, etc. Non-physical objects were not mentioned at all.		
Mao Zedong	1957	Party Rectification	党内整改			
Mao Zedong	1957–1959	Anti-Rightist Movement	反右运动 / 反右運動	The Anti-Rightist movement emerged in response to the Hundred Flowers Campaign, and constituted an effort to identify and purge alleged "rightists" and critics of Communist Party policies. The movement occurred in two waves, from 1957 to 1959, and saw the political persecution of an estimated 400,000 - 700,000 people. Intellectuals were a particular target of the campaign, and an estimated 10 percent of intellectuals, engineers and technicians were labeled rightists in the campaign. Those afflicted with the label were subject to social exclusion, criticism and repentance sessions, or were sent to prisons or camps as punishment.		
Mao Zedong	1958–1960	Great Leap Forward	大跃进 / 大躍進	The Great Leap Forward was campaign initiated by Mao Zedong whose aim was to rapidly transform China into a modern communist society through the process of agriculturalization, industrialization, and collectivization of land. Private farming was prohibited, and those engaged in it were labeled as counter revolutionaries and persecuted. Although intended to increase China's economic output, the Great Leap Forward was instead a period of economic regression. The policies enacted during the campaign, coupled with the use of coercion and violence, resulted in the Great Chinese Famine and led to the deaths of 36 - 45 million.	17 to 45 million	
Mao Zedong	1958–1962	Four Pests Campaign	消灭麻雀运动（灭四害） / 消滅麻雀運動	A mass mobilization effort to eradicate rats, flies, mosquitoes, and sparrows. The extermination of the last as part of the associated Eliminate Sparrows campaign upset the ecological balance, and enabled the proliferation of locust, resulting in severe crop damage.		
Mao Zedong	1959	Anti-Right Deviation Struggle	反右倾斗争 / 反右傾鬥爭	A massive campaign started with the purge of Marshal Peng Dehuai, then Minister of National Defense, who expressed disagreement with Mao over the radical policies of Great Leap Forward. In total, over 3 million CCP members were purged or penalized during the campaign.		
Mao Zedong	1961	Reeducation of Party Members				
Mao Zedong	1963–1966	Socialist Education Movement	社会主义教育运动 / 社會主義教育運動	Also called the "four clean-ups" campaign, the Socialist Education Movement sought to cleanse the bureaucracy of "reactionary" elements, particularly in political, economic, organizational and ideological fields. Part of the campaign involved sending members of the government and intellectuals to the countryside to learn from peasants.		
Mao Zedong	1963	Learn from Comrade Lei Feng	向雷锋同志学习 / 向雷鋒同志學習	A propaganda campaign encouraging imitation of Lei Feng, a young People's Liberation Army Soldier who died at age 22. Lei Feng was held up as an example of communist ideals, including a strong work ethic, self-sacrificing nature, and unquestioning dedication to Mao Zedong and the socialist cause.		
Mao Zedong	1964	Party Rectification				
Mao Zedong	1966–1976	Cultural Revolution	无产阶级文化大革命 (or 文化大革命/文革)	The Cultural Revolution, formally called the Great Proletarian Cultural Revolution, was a social-political movement that took place in the People's Republic of China from 1966 through 1976. Set into motion by Mao Zedong, its stated goal was to enforce communism in the country by removing capitalist, traditional and cultural elements from Chinese society, and to impose Maoist orthodoxy within the Party. The revolution marked the return of Mao Zedong to a position of power after the failed Great Leap Forward. The movement paralyzed China politically and significantly affected the country economically and socially.	500,000 to 2 million	
Mao Zedong	1966	Destruction of Four Olds	破四旧 / 破四舊	The Destruction of the Four Olds was among the first major initiatives of the Cultural Revolution. Mao Zedong called for the "Four Olds"—Old Customs, Old Culture, Old Habits, and Old Ideas— to be destroyed. The task fell largely on Red Guards, who heeded Mao's call to burn and destroy cultural artifacts, Chinese literature, paintings, and religious symbols and temples. People in possession of these goods were punished. Intellectuals were targeted as personifications of the Four Olds, resulting in their persecution.		
Mao Zedong	1967	Cleansing the Class Ranks	清理阶级队伍			
Mao Zedong	1969	Party Rectification				
Mao Zedong	1968–1978	Down to the Countryside Movement	上山下乡，接受贫下中农再教育 / 上山下鄉，接受貧下中農再教育	Partly in an effort to curb the chaos of the Cultural Revolution and dissolve the Red Guards, Mao initiated a campaign to send urban youth to remote rural areas to "learn from the peasants." The campaign, which spanned from the late 1960s well into the 1970s, produced a "lost generation" in China, as the "sent-down youth" were denied the opportunity to pursue advanced education.		
Mao Zedong	1970–1972	One Strike-Three Anti	一打三反	A campaign to crack down on "counterrevolutionaries" under the pretext of combatting the "three-antis" of graft and embezzlement, profiteering, and extravagance and waste. Official estimates state that in the first ten months of the campaign, 280,000 'counterrevolutionaries' were arrested.		
Mao Zedong	1973–1975	Criticize Lin, Criticize Confucius	批林批孔运动 / 批林批孔運動	A campaign launched in 1973 that linked previous attacks against the late Lin Biao to criticisms of Confucianism. The campaign involved allegorical references wherein Mao and the Gang of Four were represented Qin Shihuangdi and the Legalist tradition, and Zhou Enlai was taken to represent the reactionary forces of Confucianism. The campaign served to indirectly criticize Zhou Enlai, while giving support to the Gang of Four.		
Mao Zedong	1975–1977	Counterattack the Right-Deviationist Reversal-of-Verdicts Trend	反击右倾翻案风 / 反击右傾翻案風	Gang of four used it to attack Deng Xiaoping		
Hua Guofeng	1976	Campaign to denounce the Gang of Four		In the immediate aftermath of Mao Zedong's death, the "Gang of Four" — composed of Jiang Qing, Zhang Chunqiao, Yao Wenyuan, and Wang Hongwen—were denounced as counterrevolutionaries. As all four had held prominent positions in Mao's government, they were blamed for the worst excesses of the Cultural Revolution, and prosecuted in 1981.		
Deng Xiaoping	1982	Anti-Corruption, Anti-Economic Crimes				
Deng Xiaoping	1983–1984	Anti-Spiritual Pollution Campaign	清除精神污染 / 清除精神污染	The anti-spiritual pollution campaign was propelled by conservative factions of the Chinese Communist Party, notably Deng Liqin, in the fall of 1983. The campaign was part of a backlash against growing intellectual discourse promoting humanism and civil rights and other manifestations of "bourgeois liberalism."		
Deng Xiaoping	1983–1987	Party Rectification				
Deng Xiaoping	1986–1992	Anti-bourgeois liberalization	反对资产阶级自由化			
Deng Xiaoping	1989–2000	Anti-Corruption Drive				
Jiang Zemin	1991–	Patriotic Education Campaign	爱国主义教育 / 愛國主義教育	Initiated in 1991, but not carried out in full scale until 1994. The main goal of the campaign was to "boost the nation's spirit, enhance cohesion, foster national self esteem and pride"		
Jiang Zemin	1996	Grasping the large, letting go of the small	抓大放小	Economic campaign		
Jiang Zemin	1998–2000	"Three Stresses" party rectification	三讲	Launched by Jiang Zemin in late 1998, the "Three Stresses" campaign was an ideological rectification among Communist Party members that asked them to stress study, politics, and righteousness (jiang xuexi, jiang zhengzhi, jiang zhengqi). The campaign was part of an effort to reconcile market reforms with socialist philosophy. In the course of the campaign, some high-ranking Communist Party officials were prosecuted on corruption charges.		
Jiang Zemin	1999–present	Campaign against Falun Gong	取缔法轮功 / 取締法輪功	Campaign to eradicate the Falun Gong, a qigong-based spiritual practice believed to have had 70 million practitioners in 1999. The campaign involves the use of propaganda, extrajudicial imprisonment, and coercive "reeducation" of Falun Gong adherents. At least two thousand are believed to have been tortured to death, and hundreds of thousands imprisoned.		
Jiang Zemin	2000	Study and Practice the Important Thought of "Three Represents"	学习实践“三个代表”重要思想			
Hu Jintao	2003	Study and Practice the Scientific Outlook on Development	学习实践“科学发展观”			
Hu Jintao	2004	Building a Socialist Harmonious Society	构建“社会主义和谐社会”			
Hu Jintao	2005	Campaign to Maintain the Advanced Nature of Communist Party Members	保持共产党员先进性教育 / 保持共產黨員先進性教育	Ideological rectification campaign designed to strengthen Party members' knowledge of Marxism, fight corruption, and guard against social contradictions that threaten the ruling status of the Communist Party. Following the campaign's official launch in January 2005, millions of Party members were made to attend education and self-criticism sessions.		
Hu Jintao	2006	Eight Honors and Eight Shames	八荣八耻 / 八榮八恥	A moral code introduced by Hu Jintao intended to "measure the work, conduct, and attitude" of Communist Party members.		
Hu Jintao	2009	6521 Project	6521行動	A nationwide operation helmed by Xi Jinping and Zhou Yongkang to ensure "social stability" by suppressing potential dissidents during anniversaries of political significance. The campaign's name refers to the 60th anniversary of the founding of the People's Republic of China, the 50th anniversary of the 1959 Tibetan uprising, the 20th anniversary of the 1989 Tiananmen Square protests and massacre, and the 10th anniversary of the persecution of Falun Gong.		
Hu Jintao	2010–2012	Campaign to Contend for Excellence	创先争优活动			
Xi Jinping	2012	Anti-corruption campaign under Xi Jinping	中共十八大后的反腐败 (习近平反腐)	A nationwide operation launched by Xi Jinping to stamp out corruption in the Chinese Communist Party.		
Xi Jinping	2013–2014	Party's Mass Line Education and Practice Activities	党的群众路线教育实践活动			
Xi Jinping	2013–present	Comprehensively Deepening Reform	全面深化改革			
Xi Jinping	2014–present	Deepening National Defense and Military Reform	深化国防和军队改革			
Xi Jinping	2014	Operation Fox Hunt	猎狐专项行动			
Xi Jinping	2015–present	Operation Sky Net	天网			
Xi Jinping	2015–present	"Three Stricts and Three Honests" Special Education Campaign	“三严三实”专题教育			
Xi Jinping	2015–2021	Battle Against Poverty	脱贫攻坚战			
Xi Jinping	2016–present	Two Studies and One Action	两学一做			
Xi Jinping	2018–2021	Special Campaign to Crack Down on Organized Crime and Eliminate Evil	扫黑除恶专项斗争			
Xi Jinping	2020–2022	Zero-COVID	动态清零			
Xi Jinping	2021–present	Campaign on Party History Learning and Education	党史学习教育			

== See also ==
- History of China
- History of the Republic of China
- History of the Chinese Communist Party
- History of the People's Republic of China
- Timeline of Chinese history
