= Wang Ruoshui =

Chinese philosopher (1926–2002)

- 王若水
- Wang Ruoshui in 1998
- Born: 25 October 1926; Shanghai, Republic of China
- Died: 9 January 2002 (aged 75); Boston, Massachusetts, U.S.
- Occupations: Journalist, philosopher
- Political party: Chinese Communist Party

Wang Ruoshui (Chinese: 王若水; pinyin: Wáng Ruòshuǐ; Wade–Giles: Wang Jo-shui, 1926–2002), was a Chinese journalist, political theorist, and philosopher. He was born in Shanghai, and graduated from Peking University with a degree in philosophy. After working at the People's Daily for over three decades, Wang was expelled from the party in 1987 during the Anti-Bourgeois Liberalization Campaign, largely due to his long-standing vocal advocacy of Marxist humanism that led to the Anti-Spiritual Pollution Campaign in 1983. After his exile from the party, he went to United States as a visiting scholar to continue his research. Wang was known as a major exponent of Marxist humanism and of Chinese liberalism in the second half on his life.

== Early life and education ==
Wang Ruoshui was born in Shanghai in 1926. At the age of four, his family moved to Hunan province, where he attended Yali High School. After the Second Sino-Japanese War started, Wang and his family moved to Sichuan, away from the front lines. In 1946, Wang went to Peking University to study philosophy. Two years later he graduated and joined the Communist Party.

In the 1950s, Wang was a devotee of Maoism and took part in ideological campaigns targeting the previously popular ideas of Hu Shih, Liang Shuming, and Hu Feng. Later Wang became an advocate of "One Divides Into Two" and attacked Yang Xianzhen on the issue of "unity of thoughts and existence" over a long period. This came back to haunt him when Yang was rehabilitated in the 1970s.

== At People's Daily ==
After working at Beijing Policy Research Office for a year after he graduated, Wang was assigned to the People's Daily in 1950. In November 1954, the Chief Editor of People's Daily ordered Wang to write articles criticizing Hu Shih. Wang wrote "Eliminating Hu Shih's Reactionary Philosophy" in a single day; this and several other articles he wrote at the time were praised by Mao. In April 1957, Wang's "Boldly Let Go - Implementing the Policy of 'A hundred of flowers blossom and a hundred schools of thoughts' (百家争鸣，百花齐放)" was again praised by Mao.

In the year of 1963, Wang published "The Philosophy of the Table", which defended Mao's version of dialectical materialism, again winning praise from Mao. Before the Cultural Revolution, at the height of the Sino-Soviet split, Wang was recruited by Maoist literary henchman Zhou Yang to a group he was organizing to research and criticize the Marxist humanism which was then influential in the Eastern bloc.

After the "September 13th incident" in 1971, Mao appointed Zhou Enlai to manage People's Daily. In response to Zhou's directive to criticize extreme leftism and Lin Biao, Wang published three articles on October 14, 1972, which were criticized by Zhang Chunqiao and Yao Wenyuan. Wang wrote a letter to Mao with his complaints, and was suspended and sent to Red Star People's Commune at Daxing County for labour reform.

Wang returned to the People's Daily in 1976; in 1977, he was promoted to the position of deputy editor in charge of commentary, theory and literature, under Hu Jiwei, one of the earliest critics of the Cultural Revolution. Soon after the downfall of the Maoists and far-left faction, Wang revealed that these much reviled "revisionist" doctrines had had a great impact on him, and had provided a lens through which he could understand and condemn the Cultural Revolution and the cult of Mao himself.

In the early 1980s, Wang published "About the Concept Alienation", "Discussing the problem of Alienation", to introduce the concept of alienation to the Chinese readers; He also published "Man is the Starting Point of Marxism" and "A Defense of Humanism", advocating Marxist humanism.

From 1978 to 1982, Wang served in the National People's Congress and as a commissioner at the Central Discipline Inspection Committee.

In 1983, Wang was removed from the position of deputy editor of People's Daily as demanded by the director of CCP's propaganda department, Deng Liqun, at the same time as his divorce with his first wife Zhong Dan was concluded. In the fall of that year, he met Feng Yuan, a twenty-year-old journalism graduate student who just graduated from Fudan University. Wang married Feng in January 1987.

For his support for the 1986 student movement and various opinions against the Chinese Communist Party, Wang was expelled from the Communist party in 1987 as a part of a campaign against "bourgeois liberalization". He continued to write trenchant criticisms of the regime, and conduct polemics against Mao's former secretary Hu Qiaomu (1912-1993), a doctrinaire Marxist who had been behind his expulsion from the Party.

== Later life and research ==
After expelled from the party in 1987, Wang chose to continue on his research. In the year of 1989 and 1993, he was invited as a visiting scholar by the Fairbank Center for Chinese Studies at Harvard University. In the year 1994, he went to UC Berkeley as a visiting professor.

In June 1996, Wang was diagnosed with lung cancer, which eventually led to his death. When asked for his will before surgery the next month, Wang dictated the outline for three essays he was planning to write. Later in 1998, Wang spent a semester as a visiting professor at Lund University in Sweden.

In 2000, Wang returned to Harvard University when his wife Feng Yuan received the Nieman Fellowship. In September 2001, he gave his last-ever speech to an audience of graduate students there.

Wang died in his sleep on January 9, 2002.

== Writing ==
In his early years, he was a firm Marxist. Though he was later known as an exponent of Marxist humanism, initially he was one of its opponents. In 1963, the same year Mao praised his "The Philosophy of Table", he was assigned to a group to create brochures criticizing humanism, which was generally regarded as a bourgeois ideology.. According to Wang himself, his attitude toward humanism was the same as that of the others in the group.

However, as a philosopher, Wang constantly developed his views and revised his opinions, especially when he witnessed political changes that led him to question his beliefs, such as when Mao selected Lin Biao, who endorsed the deification of Mao, as his successor. When the Cultural Revolution ended, Wang published several articles to criticize the movement and the cult of Mao. Some of his most famous works about Marxist humanism and alienation were published at that time.

In the year of 1987, he was asked to leave the Party for "bourgeois liberalization"; he refused and was later expelled. Afterwards, Wang managed to publish previously suppressed works through publishers based in Hong Kong. Those works, while elaborating on his latest research on humanism and Mao, also revealed intimate details of the political struggles he previously involved in and his own growth as a thinker. Even near the end of his life in Boston, he still managed to record some of his thoughts with the help of his wife Feng Yuan.

== Major works ==
=== Books ===
- Philosophical Common Sense: First Draft. Learning Magazine, 1957.
- Marxist Epistemology is the Theory of Practice. Tianjin People's Publishing House, 1964, 1965.
- On the Frontier of Philosophy. People's Publishing House, 1980.
- A Defense for Humanism. Sanlian Bookstore (Hong Kong) Co., Ltd., 1986.
- The Pain of Wisdom. Sanlian Bookstore (Hong Kong) Co., Ltd., 1989.
- With the Background of Resigning of Hu Yaobang: The Fate of Humanism in China. Hong Kong Der Spiegel Press, 1997.
- Newly Discovered Mao Zedong: the Great Man in the Eyes of the Servant. Hong Kong Der Spiegel Press, 2002.

=== Articles ===
- "The Philosophy of Table." 1963.
- "Discussing the Issue of Alienation." 1980.
- "A Defense for Humanism." 1983.
- "Some Thoughts on Reflection Theory, Subjectivity and Humanism." 1988.
- "The Philosophy about Marxist Man." 1986.
- "My Marxist Views." 1995.
- "Dialectics and Mao Zedong's Philosophy of Struggle." 1999.

== See also ==
- Chinese philosophy
- Marxist Humanism
- Alienation
- Anti-Spiritual Pollution Campaign

== Further readings ==
- David Kelly, 'The Emergence of Socialist Humanism in China: Wang Ruoshui and the Critique of Socialist Alienation,' in Merle Goldman, Timothy Cheek and Carol Lee Hamrin, eds, China's Intellectuals and the State, Harvard University Press, 1987, pp. 159–182.
- David Kelly, translator and editor, 'Writings of Wang Ruoshui on Philosophy, Humanism and Alienation,' Chinese Studies in Philosophy: 16 (3), Spring 1985, pp. 1–120;
- de Bary, Wm. Theodore, ed. Sources of Chinese Tradition, Volume II (Second Edition) New York: Columbia, 2000.
- Wang, Ruoshui. With the Background of Resigning of Hu Yaobang—the Fate of Humanism in China, Hong Kong Der Spiegel Press, 1997
- Wang, Ruoshui. Newly Discovered Mao Zedong: the Great Man in the Eyes of the Servant, Hong Kong Der Spiegel Press, 2002
