= Three Stresses campaign =

1998–2000 Chinese ideological campaign

The "Three Stresses" campaign (Chinese: 三讲; pinyin: sānjiǎng) was an ideological rectification campaign among Chinese Communist Party (CCP) members. The initiative was formally launched in 1998 by then-General Secretary of the Chinese Communist Party Jiang Zemin, and its name refers to the need to “stress study, stress politics, stress righteousness” (jiang xuexi, jiang zhengzhi, jiang zhengqi). The campaign was intended to strengthen discipline within the CCP and consolidate support for Jiang Zemin. During the campaign, which spanned from late 1998 to 2000, senior staff within the government, military, party offices, universities, and state and private enterprises were required to spend several weeks engaging in political study and self-criticism sessions with the goal of improving unity and enhancing loyalty to the CCP. According to a retired official cited in the New York Times, Jiang also hoped to use the campaign to "identify loyal, promising officials for future leadership positions."

The initiative was only the second major party rectification campaigns launched since the death of Mao Zedong (the previous campaign having begun in 1983).

== Background ==
China's embrace of a market economy and the dismantling of the Marxist–Leninist system in the 1980s and 1990s precipitated a deterioration in ideological unity and purpose within the CCP. Moreover, the party was facing a variety of internal and external challenges, including but not limited to growing crime and corruption, income disparities, weakening central government control, and calls for political liberalization.

In order to address these challenges, the CCP leadership under Jiang Zemin sought to adapt and redefine the official ideology to meet changing circumstances, while stressing the continued importance of loyalty to the CCP. Andrew Nathan and Bruce Gilley write that the campaign served another purpose: if Jiang Zemin wished to have a lasting impact on the CCP itself, "he had to come forward with a new conception of its mandate and its basis for action." To that end, Jiang enunciated a number of new approaches and slogans in the early and mid-1990s. The earliest proposals for the Three Stresses campaign emerged in 1995, when Jiang began proposed an ideological rectification campaign urging party leaders to "stress politics." The idea initially met with opposition within the party; Qiao Shi and Li Ruihuan, in particular, viewed the proposal as a means of self-aggrandizement. In 1998, following the forced retirement of Qiao Shi, Jiang proceeded to roll out the three stresses campaign, which leadership hoped would stave off atrophy and decay within the CCP.

== The campaign ==
In October 1998, Jiang Zemin, with assistance from then-executive secretary of the Secretariat Hu Jintao and chief of staff Zeng Qinghong announced plans for the Three Stresses campaign to the Politburo. In December of the same year, Hu Jintao publicly launched the campaign with an appearance on television, in which he urged party members to write self-criticisms and participate in work meetings to discuss their methods of carrying out their work. CCP members were also encouraged to go to the countryside to promote the campaign.

During its initial phase, the Three Stresses campaign was carried out within the army, government agencies and CCP offices. Thereafter, senior staff within publishing houses, universities, research organizations, and state-owned enterprises were also enjoined to participate in political study sessions. In addition to studying the writings of Mao Zedong, Deng Xiaoping and Jiang Zemin, senior staff within workplaces were required to write critiques of both their own political failings, and criticisms of their superiors and workplaces. Although the campaign employed techniques of ideological study and self-criticism reminiscent of the Mao era, the sessions were described as comparatively tame.

Writing for the Far Eastern Economic Review, Susan Lawrence described the impact of the Three Stresses campaign on the country's corporate sector. The account told of how, in the summer of 1999, senior staff at a major bank were required to participate in dozens of group meetings "in which they have criticized their own and each other's political failings," draft self-criticism papers, in addition to conducting nearly 100 individual political sessions. The objective of the campaign was described as improving the unity of senior staff and ensuring their loyalty to the CCP and Jiang Zemin.

== Reception ==
Views on the Three Stresses campaign within the CCP leadership were deeply divided, and several senior officials viewed the campaign as an attempt by Jiang Zemin to enhance his own prestige. Li Ruihuan and Qiao Shi continued to oppose the campaign, with the latter describing it as an attempt to erect a personality cult around Jiang. Politburo member Tian Jiyun called the campaign a "joke", and expressed doubt that it could have the intended effect of enhancing discipline within the party. The criticisms led Jiang to 'clarify' during a March 2000 Politburo meeting that he had no intention using the Three Stresses to enhance his personal authority, and that it was intended purely to "rectify the Party's work style and purify the ranks of the Party's leading cadres." Premier Zhu Rongji and National People's Congress Chairman Li Peng were reportedly ambivalent towards the initiative. However, a number of rising young leaders within the CCP embraced the initiative as a means of gaining favor with Jiang. Among them were Hu Jintao, Wen Jiabao, Li Changchun, Bo Xilai, and Jia Qinglin.

== See also ==
- List of campaigns of the Chinese Communist Party
- Democratic life meeting
