= Party spirit =

Marxist-Leninist term

"Party spirit" is a term originated in Marxism–Leninism. It is translated as Dangxing (Chinese: 党性) in Chinese, Partiinost (партийность) in Russian and Parteilichkeit in German. It can be variously translated as party-mindedness, partisanship, or party spirit. The term can refer to both a philosophical position concerning the sociology of knowledge and an official doctrine of public intellectual life in the Soviet Union. The term may also mean the membership of a person in a certain political party.

== History ==
The term was coined by Vladimir Lenin in 1895, responding to Peter Struve, to counter what he considered to be the futility of objectivity in political, economic analysis. Class interests and material conditions of existence determine ideology, and thus, in a Marxist–Leninist view, true objectivity (in terms of non-partisanship) is not possible in a society of antagonistic classes. Marxists, in Lenin's view, should openly acknowledge their partisanship on the side of proletarian revolution. Bourgeois emphasis on the normative goal of objectivity is thus considered delusional. In this sense, party spirit is a universal and inevitable element of political and ideological life. Still, its presence is not always acknowledged or flatly denied by the ruling class.

Descriptively, party spirit was not a novel concept and had been described in different words by Thrasymachus, Xenophanes, and Karl Marx. However, Lenin's term has a normative element that was not present in prior descriptions of the phenomenon. In other words, Lenin insisted that party spirit should be publicly expressed whenever possible.

A clear expression of party spirit can be found in its entry in the Great Soviet Encyclopedia:

The Communist Party consistently upholds the principle of partiinost'. Defending and substantiating the goals and tasks of the working class and the policies of the Communist Party, Marxist-Leninist theory mercilessly criticizes the exploiters' system, its politics, and its ideology. ... By contrast, the bourgeoisie, whose interests conflict with those of the majority, is forced to hide its self-seeking aspirations, to pretend that its economic and political aims are those of society as a whole, and to wrap itself in the toga of non-partisanship

Party spirit is also used by Lenin in Materialism and Empirio-criticism to refer to the concept of philosophical factionalism, which he defined broadly as the struggle between idealists and materialists.

=== China ===
In China, the concept was further developed by 7th National Congress of the Chinese Communist Party, held in Yan’an from April to June 1945. Mao Zedong gave an address regarding "raising party spirit" where he encouraged CCP members to "strengthen their training in party spirit". He said that while many joined CCP and were willing to subscribe to Marxism, some had bought ideas which were incompatible or not in line with Marxist ideology, which he said was a dangerous trend. Mao said that "The Party and the world can only be made to conform with the face of the proletarian vanguard".

In the late 1970s, the editor-in-chief of the People’s Daily Hu Jiwei said that the "people’s spirit" should be primary in doing journalism, meaning that the media should report truthfully because it represented the interests of the people. Hu Jiwei argued in 1979 that "party spirit" should be consistent with human nature media should be independent from the Party, saying the media should be "the eyes and ears of CCP" in order to report accurately on the actual situation in the country and listen to the people's voices. His position was endorsed by reformist leader Hu Yaobang. Hu Qiaomu, in contrast, argued for the primacy of the "party spirit" in media and journalism. He continued to argue Hu Jiwei's ideas continued to poison the media after his resignation as editor-in-chief in 1983. After the 1989 Tiananmen Square protests and massacre, Hu Qiaomu argued the failure to properly control the press "guided matters in the direction of chaos".

China Media Projects writes that in modern China, party spirit "remains a demand that CCP members and CCP institutions, as well as groups and individuals in Chinese society more broadly, see themselves as units within the Party’s control and subject to its mandates and priorities. The intent is that "party spirit" becomes both and attitude and a practice, helping to maintain discipline and obedience". According to Wang Shilong of the Central Party School:

As an inherent and essential attribute of the ruling party, party spirit not only represents and reflects the overall image of the Party, but also manifests itself in the specific characteristics of individual Party members and is reflected in the daily thoughts, words and actions of every CCP member.

In 2013, the Study Times wrote that party spirit is the optimization, sublimation and crystallization of human nature. It said that for CCP members, maintaining a balance between "party spirit" and human nature was a constant challenge but was essential for them to struggle toward this objective in order to maintain the CCP's interests even when rules and responses are not fully clear. In the same year, People's Daily president Zhang Yannong contributed to an article titled "Maintaining the Unity of the Popular Spirit and Party Spirit", where he said regarding the discussion of the issue of "party spirit" and "popular spirit" that "not even the slightest passivity can be shown in carrying out the public opinion struggle with the hostile forces." In February, CCP General Secretary Xi Jinping gave a speech at the Symposium on News Reporting and Public Opinion, where he said:

Most fundamental to adhering to the principal of party spirit in the Party’s news and public opinion work is adhering to the Party’s leadership of news and public opinion work. The media operated by the Party and the government are propaganda positions of the Party and the government, and must be surnamed Party. All of the work of the Party’s news and public opinion media must evince the Party’s will, reflect the Party’s positions, protect the authority of the Party’s Central Committee, protect the unity of the Party, and achieve love for the Party, protection of the Party and service of the Party.
