= Bourgeois liberalization =

Term in Communist Chinese political ideology

Bourgeois liberalization (simplified Chinese: 资产阶级自由化; traditional Chinese: 資產階級自由化; pinyin: zīchǎn jiējí zìyóuhuà) is a term used by the Chinese Communist Party to refer to either the prevalent political orientation of Western representative democracy or mainstream Western popular culture. The late 1980s saw the first major usage of the term when a number of campaigns, such as the Anti-Spiritual Pollution Campaign, against bourgeois liberalism were initiated lasting until the early 1990s. The term is in active use in Chinese politics, with the Communist Party's Constitution stating party objectives include "combat[ing] bourgeois liberalization" in line with the four cardinal principles. According to the Chinese Communist Party, the concept of bourgeois liberalization was first proposed by Deng Xiaoping, the paramount leader of China from 1978 to 1989, in the early 1980s.

Deng argued that liberalization would destroy political and economical stability, making it difficult for development to take place. He defined the idea of liberalization as "inherently and completely capitalist", dismissing the existence of liberalization of proletariat or communism, and stated that the idea of liberalization was to try to turn them towards liberalism and capitalism, and thus needed to be strongly opposed on the ground of Realpolitik.

Due to the 1986 Chinese student demonstrations, Hu Yaobang, then General Secretary of the Chinese Communist Party and a leading reformist, was forced to resign from his post by Deng Xiaoping in early 1987. Left-wing conservatives such as Deng Liqun and Hu Qiaomu, under the support of Chen Yun and Li Xiannian (and even Deng himself), continued to launch the "Anti-Bourgeois Liberalization Campaign" in 1987. Zhao Ziyang, then Premier of China, successor to Hu as General Secretary and a leading reformist as well, eventually convinced Deng that the left-wing conservatives took advantage of the campaign to oppose the Reform and Opening-up program. In the end, Deng agreed to terminate the campaign in mid-1987 and supported the on-going political forms. In 2018, the Communist Party under general secretary Xi Jinping revised regulations on Party disciplinary action, expelling members from the Party if they openly adhere to bourgeois liberalization online.

== See also ==
- Bourgeoisie
- Liberalism in China
- Neoliberalism
- Capitalist roader
