= Feng Yuan (activist) =

Chinese human rights activist (born 1962)

- 冯媛
- Born: 1962 (age 63–64); Yilong County, Sichuan, China
- Education: Fudan University; Chinese Academy of Social Sciences
- Occupation: Women's rights activist
- Employer: Equality

Feng Yuan (Chinese: 冯媛; pinyin: Féng Yuán; born 1962) is a Chinese feminist activist and women's rights advocate known for her work addressing gender-based violence. Often described as one of China's earliest gender experts, she has been involved in civil-society initiatives related to domestic violence prevention and workplace sexual harassment awareness. She is a co-founder of Equality(为平), a Beijing-based NGO focused on gender equality and support for survivors of violence. She has been active in China's #MeToo movement. In 2024, she was named one of the BBC 100 Women for her contributions to women's rights.

== Biography ==
Feng was born in Yilong County, Sichuan in 1962. In 1987, she married Wang Ruoshi, a philosopher and former deputy editor-in-chief of the newspaper People's Daily. They remained married until his death from lung cancer in 2002.

In 1983, Feng graduated with a degree in journalism from Fudan University in Shanghai. She went on to obtain a master's degree from the Chinese Academy of Social Sciences in Beijing in 1986. Between 1986 and 2006, Feng worked primarily as a journalist focusing on women's issues. She wrote for People's Daily until 1991 when she left due to disagreements over its coverage of the 1989 Tiananmen Square protests and massacre and its aftermath. Feng then wrote for China Women's News. By 1998, Feng was leading trainings for women journalists.

Feng has been involved in the women's rights movement in China since 1980. In 1995, Feng was a delegate at the United Nations' World Conference on Women, held in Beijing. After the Conference, she began working for a variety of Chinese non-governmental organizations focused on the advancement of women's rights, including the Media Monitor Network for Women (1996–), which she co-founded, the Gender and Development Network in China (2000–), the Centre for Women's Studies at Shantou University (2009–), and the Women's Network for Combating HIV/AIDS (2009–). Feng has been a visiting scholar at Lund University in Sweden (1998), Harvard University in the United States (2001–2002), and the University of Hong Kong (2019–2020).

In 2014, Feng co-founded Equality (为平). She later became involved in workplace sexual harassment prevention during the emergence of China's #MeToo movement.

In 1998, she co-founded the Anti–Domestic Violence Network (ADVN), where she worked on raising awareness of domestic violence. In 2003, the organization proposed anti-domestic abuse law. Feng served as its president from 2000 to 2014.

In December 2024, she was included in the BBC 100 Women list.

== Family ==
Her husband was Wang Ruoshui.

== Activism ==
=== Anti-sexual harassment and #MeToo activism in China ===
Feng Yuan has been an activist in China's anti-sexual harassment and #MeToo movement. She points out that labeling such issues as "politically sensitive" has become a common repression tactic. She observes that although an increasing number of victims have come forward, the media continues to report on these issues, the judicial system has begun to accept related cases, and public awareness of sexual harassment is gradually shifting from investigating the perpetrator's "intentions" to valuing the victim's feelings, this progress still faces systemic resistance. For example, the sexual harassment allegations against the Beijing Film Academy, the 'Hou Liangping incident,' were quickly deleted online, and public expression was severely restricted. As a survivor of the Shenyang incident at Peking University, she also revealed how the university attributed students' actions to "external forces", using interviews with participants and pressure to undermine the movement's internal strength. She pointed out that this "sensitization" mechanism not only suppressed victims and supporters but also created tension and self-censorship within the feminist community.

Feng Yuan has encouraged the public to persist in speaking out, documenting incidents, and addressing obstacles through individual cases. She argues that sustained efforts are necessary to raise awareness and create a more effective environment for anti-sexual harassment advocacy.

=== Anti-domestic violence activism and support services ===
Feng Yuan is a core promoter and practitioner in China's fight against domestic violence. She has been involved in the advocacy for the enactment of the anti-domestic violence legislation in China and other initiatives against gender-based violence.

Feng Yuan pointed out that violence against women takes many forms, including harassment, physical assault, groping, beating wives, drowning female infants, abusing housewives, involuntary pregnancy, forced abortion, economic exploitation and control, etc., but these were not formally recognized as "violence against women" and only relegated to "household matters" in China before the 1980s.

In 2014, she launched China's first 24/7 hotline dedicated to serving victims of gender-based violence from diverse occupations, including both employed women and unemployed housewives, and professionals like female police officers and judges, who also face domestic violence. The hotline number was first publicized and attracted attention via a special anti-domestic violence program on China Central Television (CCTV). It has received calls for assistance from men, women, and elderly people, both from rural and urban areas within China and from abroad. Post-2018, in addition to request help from domestic violence, calls about sexual harassment or assault increased significantly. Help-seekers' demands also evolved: while earlier callers mainly sough to vent, more recent callers make specific requests, such as applying for protection orders or initiating divorce proceedings, and are more willing to disclose experiences of abuse, recognizing that they are not to blame.

Feng held the view that anti-domestic work extended beyond providing assistance to survivors of domestic violence, emphasizing the need to address the underlying gender inequalities inherent in the social structure in China that breeds the ground for violence against women.

=== Scholarly research and analysis of anti-domestic violence legislation ===
As a scholar, Feng Yuan has analyzed and wrote on the historical evolution and key factors that contributed to the effective implementation of China's anti-domestic violence law. According to her, the legislation's success stemmed from nine collaborative strategies employed by Chinese and international feminists, including establishing legal frameworks, conducting multi-sectoral cooperation pilot projects, providing services, conducting large-scale capacity building, localizing global advocacy issues, effectively mobilizing the media, continuously conducting knowledge production, using performance art to increase publicity, and actively submitting public opinions in the final stage of the legislation.

Feng Yuan noted the critical role NGOs on women's rights played in China during the mid-1980s and 90s for the successful enactment of the anti-domestic violence legislation. She argues that beginning in the early 1990s, pioneers within the All-China Women's Federation (ACWF) took the first steps by raising public awareness and advocating for the first local government policies specifically targeting domestic violence. International actors, including United Nations agencies, international NGOs, and bilateral aid agencies such as the British Council and the Canadian International Development Agency, provided support through funding, international expertise, and advocacy efforts. Autonomous women's organizations, most notably the Anti-Domestic Violence Network, offered direct support to victims through legal aid and public education, effectively driving changes in social attitudes from the grassroots level.

Feng Yuan proposes that the success of these organizations in promoting national anti-domestic violence legislation in China relied on a "top-down and bottom-up linkage" strategy. The All-China Women's Federation (ACWF) took the lead by piloting local anti-domestic violence policies in five provinces, Hunan, Sichuan, Ningxia, Jiangxi, and Shaanxi, from the 1990s to the early 2000s. Organizations such as the Anti-Domestic Violence Network proposed and promoted the revision of 25 local laws. These local initiatives established institutional prototypes which provided practical experience for national legislation.

=== Activism with women living with HIV/AIDS ===
Feng Yuan played a role in advancing Women's Network Against AIDS-China (WNAC), which is a NGO established in 2009 with financial support from the United Nations' UNAIDS program that empowers women living with HIV/AIDS and offers them a place to share their stories and speak for themselves. Feng often talks about how women face extra pressure and judgment because of social stigma, and how this keeps them from getting fair treatment. She believes that real change comes when women are not only cared for medically but also respected and included in public decisions.

Through community talks and local programs, Feng has worked to help women gain confidence, understand their rights, and take part in conversations about health and gender equality. Her efforts have been mentioned in China Development Brief and other reports that show how gender work in China is closely tied to public health and human rights.

In August 2009, Feng Yuan participated in a Beijing workshop on the implementation of China's National Domestic Violence Law, co-organized by UN Women and the Women's Network Against AIDS-China (WNAC). The workshop brought together participants from UN and government agencies, research institutes, and civil society organizations, and discussed measures to strengthen protections for disadvantaged women, including those living with HIV, LGBT individuals, and women with disabilities. Discussions highlighted the intersection between HIV and domestic violence, noting that women living with HIV are more vulnerable to domestic abuse, while sexual violence can also increase the risk of HIV infection.

=== Equality (为平) ===
Feng Yuan is a co-founder of Equality (为平), a Beijing-based non-governmental organization that promotes gender equality and works on issues of gender-based violence. The organization conducts various activities, such as data collection and analysis concerning cases of domestic violence, public educational programs, and legal advocacy. Equality (为平) has also carried out research and monitoring related to domestic violence, including analysis of media reports and legal documents. It has produced several monitoring reports on the implementation of the Anti-Domestic Violence Law, which have been used by civil-society groups and media outlets as refence materials.

Equality (为平) also offers consultations, legal information, and referrals to people who are victims of violence. It holds trainings and workshops for journalists, students, and community members, aiming to improve services for domestic violence survivors. Equality (为平) has also been involved in the social discourse of policy making and has been able to provide material and recommendation to assist in amendment of China's Anti-Domestic Violence Law.

Feng's organization Equality (为平) has been a grantee of the UN Trust Fund to end violence against women, administered by UN Women, which has supported its work on research, capacity building, and a domestic-violence helpline.

=== Commentary ===
Feng has spoken to news outlets about issues facing Chinese women, such as domestic abuse, government censorship of activists, misogynistic and patriarchal attitudes, policing of women's sexuality, political representation, reproductive rights, sexism at work. She has also spoken on male survivors of domestic violence, and how misogyny in China impacts non-Chinese women online.

== International cooperation ==
On March 8, 2024, International Women's Day, Feng was a dialogue guest at a seminar organized by the University of Hong Kong's Journalism and Media Studies Centre. She engaged in a transnational dialogue on East Asian feminism with the Japanese feminist scholar Chizuko Ueno. In the interview, Ueno discussed institutional issues such as "low birth rate, aging population, care burden, and female labor participation," while Feng Yuan emphasized China's "motherhood penalty" that includes unequal salaries and limited social insurance coverage. Both scholars discussed how broader social and institutional conditions influence women's everyday experience. Ueno stated that women's childbirth, old age care, and family burdens are all political issues.

== Writing ==
=== Chapters ===
- Cai, Yiping; Feng, Yuan; Guo, Yanqiu (2001). "The Women's Media Watch Network". Chinese Women Organizing. Routledge. ISBN 9781003084921.
- In Gender Dynamics, Feminist Activism and Social Transformation in China. Taylor & Francis. 2018-11-02. doi:10.4324/9780429492099.:
  - Feng, Yuan, Women levering the state in a global China : From the rise of feminist NGOs to the legislation on anti-domestic violence
  - Wu, Guoguang; Feng, Yuan, Rebelling against Mao, market, and patriarchy, pp. 249–273

=== Articles ===
- Yang, Hao; Yuan, Feng (2020). "Imbalanced Progress on the Implementation of Anti Domestic Violence Law in China". Human Rights Brief. 23: 54.
- Yuan, Feng (May 2021). "Overcoming the conundrum of being made 'politically sensitive' anti-sexual harassment: Movements and (self-) censorship". Made in China Journal. 6 (2): 186–188. doi:10.3316/informit.288525892369545.
