= Anti-bourgeois liberalization =

Chinese political slogan

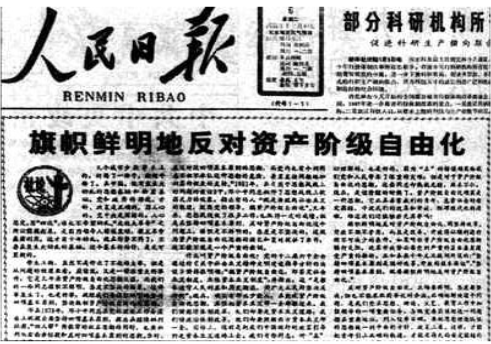
People's Daily published an overview of anti-bourgeois liberalization

Anti-bourgeois liberalization (simplified Chinese: 反对资产阶级自由化; traditional Chinese: 反對資產階級自由化; pinyin: fǎnduì zīchǎn jiējí zìyóuhuà) as a political slogan of the Chinese Communist Party (CPC) was proposed by Deng Xiaoping and others in the early 1980s. As a political movement against "bourgeois liberalization", it started at the CPC Congress held in Beijing in September 1986. The Sixth Plenary Session of the Twelfth Central Committee of the CPC was officially launched in early 1987.

At the end of 1986, the outbreak of the 1986 Chinese student demonstrations forced the reformist General Secretary of the CCP, Hu Yaobang, to resign in early 1987. With the support of Deng Xiaoping, conservative figures Deng Liqun and Hu Qiaomu of the CCP took advantage of the trend. They launched an anti-asset campaign in early 1987—the class liberalization movement. However, the move was later opposed by Zhao Ziyang, acting general secretary of the CCP Central Committee and then Premier of the State Council of China. Zhao Ziyang believed that Deng Liqun and others used the anti-liberalization movement to oppose and deny the reform and opening up and used this to convince Deng Xiaoping that the campaign gradually end in mid-1987.

== History ==
=== Origins of liberalization ===
According to the official statement of the CCP, the concept of "bourgeois liberalization" was first proposed by Deng Xiaoping. On December 25, 1980, he asserted the need to oppose bourgeois liberalization in his speech "Implementing Adjustments and Guaranteeing Stability and Unity, mentioning "the tendency to criticize and oppose the tendency to worship capitalism and advocate bourgeois liberalization."

In 1983, conservatives within the Chinese Communist Party launched a political campaign to "Anti-Spiritual Pollution Campaign." In October of the same year, Deng Xiaoping said that "the erroneous views of the "left" in ideological and theoretical aspects still need to continue to be criticized and corrected. However, it should be clearly pointed out that the current ideological front must first focus on solving the problems, which is to correct the right, weakness and laxity." On May 20, 1985, Deng Xiaoping said when meeting with Taiwanese Professor Chen Guying: "Our mainland adheres to socialism and does not take the evil path of capitalism."

=== 1986 Chinese student demonstrations ===
As China's reform and opening up continues, various problems such as official collapse, power-for-money trading, corruption, and privileges have emerged in Chinese society, and economic reform has also encountered obstacles from the original political system. Starting from the first half of 1986, Deng Xiaoping once again proposed "political reform" and launched the discussion and formulation of "political system reform." In September of the same year, the "Central Political System Reform Research Group" was established, with members including Zhao Ziyang, Hu Qili, Tian Jiyun, Bo Yibo, and Peng Chong. The starting point of Deng Xiaoping's political reform was to separate the party and government, improve administrative efficiency, eliminate bureaucratic shortcomings, and promote further reform of the economic system. However, the Western constitutional scheme cannot be copied. He emphasized that "to build a system that enhances administrative efficiency, democracy must In connection with the legal system, only by establishing the legal system can we have a stable social environment. Our administrative agencies should be very effective.

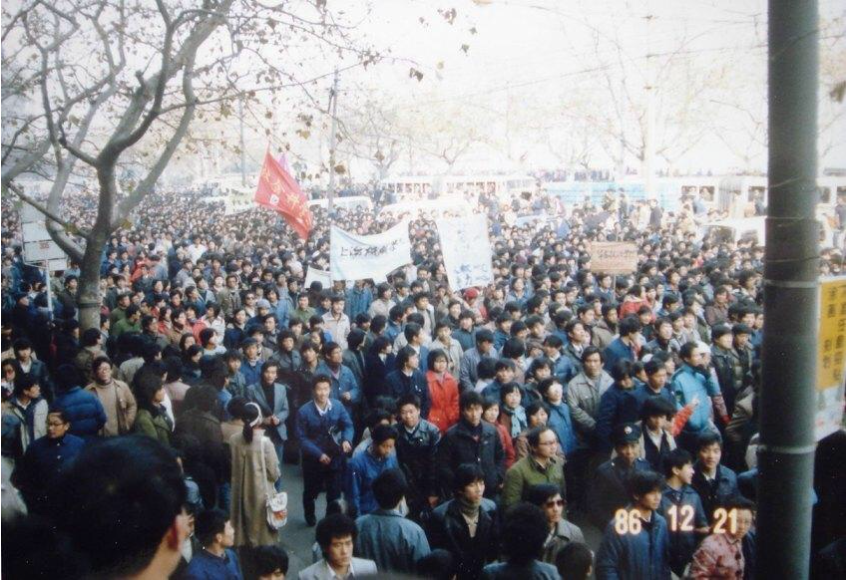
On December 21, 1986, students marched in Shanghai

At the same time, on September 28, 1986, the Sixth Plenary Session of the 12th Central Committee of the Chinese Communist Party adopted the "Resolution of the Central Committee of the Communist Party of China on Guiding Principles for the Construction of Socialist Spiritual Civilization." Deng Xiaoping believed that:

Liberalization itself is bourgeois. There is no proletarian or socialist liberalization. Liberalization is a confrontation, opposition, or modification of our current policies and systems. The actual situation is that liberalization is to lead us to the road of capitalism, so we use the term opposition to bourgeois liberalization. It doesn't matter what was used here or there; real politics requires us to write this in the resolution. I advocate opposition to liberalization, not only this time but also in ten or twenty years. This trend of thought cannot be resisted, and opening up will inevitably introduce many messy things. When combined, it has an impact on our four socialist modernizations that cannot be ignored.

In December 1986, the 1986 Chinese student demonstrations broke out across mainland China, raising opinions on issues such as school management, reforming the country's political system, and chanting slogans such as "want democracy." In mid-December, Hu Yaobang, then general secretary of the CCP Central Committee, chaired a meeting of the Secretariat of the CCP Central Committee to discuss the situation of the student unrest and proposed a policy focusing on diversion. On December 27, Hu Yaobang attended the meeting of party committee secretaries of various provinces, municipalities, and autonomous regions and delivered a speech, reiterating the policy of focusing on guidance, which was endorsed by the majority of the Secretariat of the Central Committee and the party committee secretaries of various provinces, municipalities and autonomous regions. On December 27, 1986, Hu Qiaomu, Wang Zhen, Deng Liqun, Bo Yibo, and others, the main initiators of anti-bourgeois liberalization, went to Deng Xiaoping's house to reflect on the seriousness of the student unrest. They unanimously believed it resulted from Hu Yaobang's appeasement and weak leadership. Hu Yaobang is believed to be responsible for the current situation. On December 30, Deng Xiaoping notified Hu Yaobang, Zhao Ziyang, Wan Li, Hu Qili, Li Peng, He Dongcheng, and others to come to his home for talks and asserted:

If students cause trouble, it won't cause any severe problems, but judging from the nature of the problem, it is a painful incident. When we deal with students causing trouble, we mainly adopt the method of diversion in the previous period, which is necessary. The guidance also includes the use of legal means. It must be dealt with firmly if it disrupts social order and violates criminal laws. Wherever there is trouble, the leadership needs a clear-cut banner or strong attitude. This is not a problem of one or two places, nor a problem of one or two years. It results from the lack of a clear-cut stand and resolute attitude in opposing the ideological trend of bourgeois liberalization in the past few years. This happened, and it was a good thing, reminding us. It should be said that from the central to the local governments, they are weak on the ideological and theoretical front, have lost their ground, and have a laissez-faire attitude toward bourgeois liberalization. Good people get no support, and bad people are very rampant. ... Among the people in Shanghai, there is a rumor that the central government has a protective layer, and there are two opinions on whether to adhere to the four basic principles and oppose liberalization. ..... When discussing democracy, we cannot copy bourgeois democracy or engage in the trilogy of powers. I often criticize those in force in the United States, saying they have three governments. Of course, the American bourgeoisie uses this method to deal with other countries externally, but it also fights with itself internally, causing trouble. We cannot adopt this method.

Hu Yaobang, General Secretary of the CCP Central Committee, stepped down in January 1987 | Forced to resign as General Secretary, he was later criticized for "bourgeois liberalization".

=== Movement carried out ===
In early 1987, the anti-bourgeois liberalization movement gradually unfolded. In January 1987, Deng Xiaoping believed: "If in the past we paid more attention to interference from the 'left' and not enough to interference from the right, then this student riot reminds us that we must pay more attention to interference from the right." On January 28, the Central Committee of the CCP issued the "Notice on Several Issues Concerning the Current Opposition to Bourgeois Liberalization", stating that "the core of pursuing bourgeois liberalization is to negate the socialist system and advocate the capitalist system, which is to deny the leadership of the Communist Party."

Liu Binyan, Fang Lizhi, Wang Ruowang, and others were expelled from the party during this movement. Ba Jin and others were publicly criticized. Gao Xingjian, a relatively junior playwright who had avant-garde works at the time, was also charged.

=== Movement end ===
During the anti-liberalization movement, the primary energy of Zhao Ziyang, acting general secretary of the CCP Central Committee and then Premier of the State Council of China, was "almost devoted to how to prevent the anti-liberalization struggle from expanding; to control and limit leftist forces through anti-liberalization. Oppose reform and opening up." Zhao Ziyang was worried that the movement launched by Deng Liqun and others would impact the ongoing discussions on economic system reform and political system reform, as well as various fields such as education, science and technology, culture, and rural areas. Therefore, he organized forces to engage in games and struggles with Deng Liqun and others.

On April 28, 1987, Zhao Ziyang reported to Deng Xiaoping that some people opposed reform and opening up as "left" and used anti-liberalization to deny reform and opening up. He emphasized that this atmosphere was highly inconsistent with the 13th National Congress of the Chinese Communist Party held in the second half of 1987. From now on, we must focus on promoting reform and opening up to prepare public opinion for the convening of the Thirteenth National Congress. He suggested that the 13th National Congress be republished in 1980. Deng Xiaoping's "8.18 Speech" on "Reform of the Party and State Leadership System" on August 18. Deng Xiaoping agreed with Zhao Ziyang's opinion and asked him to give a speech on this issue.

On May 13, 1987, the "Propaganda, Theory, News, and Party School Cadres Meeting" was held in Huairen Hall, Zhongnanhai. More than 1,000 leading cadres from the above systems in Beijing, central and state agencies, ministries, commissions, and above attended the meeting. At this meeting, Zhao Ziyang gave a "5.13 Speech" and seriously criticized the idea of extending the struggle against bourgeois liberalization to the economic field; on July 1, "People's Daily" republished Deng Xiaoping's "8.18 speech". After the publication of these two speeches, the "anti-bourgeois liberalization" movement ended, and reform and opening up once again became the mainstream of public opinion propaganda.

== Movement follow-up ==
In 1989, the "Tian Tiananmen Incident" broke out, marking the failure of the late political system reforms promoted by Deng Xiaoping, Zhao Ziyang, and others in mainland China in the 1980s, and Zhao Ziyang and other senior CCP reformists were dismissed from their posts. On September 16, 1989, when Deng Xiaoping met with Nobel Prize winner and Chinese-American scholar Tsung-Dao Lee, he said, "The opposite of the Four Persistences is bourgeois liberalization. Adhere to the Four Cardinal Principles and oppose bourgeois liberalization. Over the years, I say it multiple times every year, but they don't implement it."

With the revolutions of 1989 and the dissolution of the Soviet Union leading to the failure of a series of communist regimes, anti-peaceful evolution replaced opposition to bourgeois liberalization as the center of Chinese political life in the 1990s.

== See also ==
- Cultural revolution
- Reform and opening up
- 3rd Plenary Session of the 11th Central Committee of the Chinese Communist Party
- Four Modernizations, Moderately prosperous society
- Strike Hard Against Crime Campaign (1983)
- Anti-Spiritual Pollution Campaign
- 1986 Chinese student demonstrations
- Deng Xiaoping's southern tour
