= Campaign against spiritual pollution =

1983 political movement in mainland China

- Chinese: 清除精神污染
- Literal meaning: eliminate spirit pollution
Transcriptions
Standard Mandarin
- Hanyu Pinyin: qīngchú jīngshén wūrǎn

The campaign against spiritual pollution, (Chinese: 清除精神污染; pinyin: qīngchú jīngshén wūrǎn) or Anti-Spiritual Pollution Campaign, was a political campaign spearheaded by conservative factions within the Chinese Communist Party that lasted from October 1983 to January 1984. In general, its advocates wanted to curb Western-inspired liberal ideas among the Chinese populace, a by-product of the nascent reform and opening up and the "New Enlightenment" movement which began in 1978.

"Spiritual pollution" has been called "a deliberately vague term that embraces every manner of bourgeois import from erotica to existentialism", and is supposed to refer to "obscene, barbarous or reactionary materials, vulgar taste in artistic performances, indulgence in individualism" and statements that "run counter to the country's social system" according to Deng Liqun, the CCP's propaganda chief at the time of the campaign.

The campaign reached a climax in mid-November 1983 and largely faded into obscurity into 1984 after intervention from Deng Xiaoping. However, elements of the campaign were rehashed during the "anti-bourgeois liberalization" campaign in late 1986 against reformist CCP general secretary Hu Yaobang.

== The historical aspect ==
=== Origins ===
The campaign against spiritual pollution can be said to have its origins in the 12th Party National Congress held in September 1982, during which Deng Xiaoping stated his intention to continue China's march towards economic modernization and liberalization, a process that he initiated in 1978. Attempting to maintain a balance between the conservative and moderate factions in the Party, Deng tempered his emphasis on continued economic development with a call to build up China's "socialist spiritual civilization" so as to preserve its socialist ideological orientation and protect it against the unwanted societal impacts of "bourgeois liberalism", which had begun trickling in since the policy of opening up began in 1978. During the Party Congress, Hu Yaobang warned that "capitalist forces and other forces hostile to our socialist cause will seek to corrupt us and harm our country," and exhorted Party members to hold true to communist ideals and discipline.

The 12th Party National Congress also laid the foundations for the establishment of a new constitution, approved by the National People's Congress in December of the same year. The constitution rejected the ultra-left ideology of the Mao era, provided for greater protection of citizens' dignity and civil liberties, and advocated for an orderly, institutionalized and accountable system of justice. The new constitution carried significant caveats, however; it specified, for instance, that citizens' freedom of privacy and correspondence were protected, except in cases where it was of interest to the state. Following the revisions to the constitution at the end of 1982, critical academic discourse grew. Scholars called for greater respect for human dignity and freedoms, and for a reconciliation of socialist and humanist ideals. By the spring of 1983, calls for a more humanist society were reaching a crescendo, with scholars openly criticizing the excesses of the socialist dictatorship.

Although some Chinese officials, including Deng Liqun, saw some value in the writings of the humanist intellectuals, by June 1983, fears were growing that criticism of this nature had the potential to severely undermine the political and ideological basis for the CCP's legitimacy. On 4 June 1983, Deng delivered a speech at the Central Party School which criticized the concepts of "alienation" and "humanism", and called on cadres to "eliminate spiritual pollution". He said that while some openly opposed the Four Cardinal Principles, others "label [‘odd’ things from the West] as 'new ideas' and let them emit a foul smell among people, polluting and poisoning people's souls, disturbing people's thoughts, and hindering the construction of socialist material civilization and spiritual civilization... All of our comrades engaged in propaganda work have a responsibility to adopt a Marxist–Leninist attitude, carefully analyze all kinds of erroneous trends of thought, and work hard to eliminate spiritual pollution." With his speech, Deng Liqun effectively gave rise to the term "spiritual pollution" in Chinese politics. In another speech, Deng denounced "spiritual pollution in all ideological fields" and asserted improvements in "material civilization" required accompanying developments in "spiritual civilization".

In June 1983, premier Zhao Ziyang delivered an address at the opening of the first session of the 6th National People's Congress warning against the growing liberal tendencies in academic and artistic circles, and criticized such trends as being representative of a decadent ideology at odds with the goals of socialism. Zhao linked trends in writing and artistic circles to rising instances of crime, murder, rape, and corruption, blaming the growing crime rate on "political and ideological apathy". He called on law enforcement to commence a strike-hard campaign to suppress counterrevolutionaries and criminal activities. Following Zhao's speech, conservative CCP journals began linking the recent crime wave with the scholarly discourse on humanism. The editors of Red Flag, for instance, declared that "Various kinds of crime are bound to occur where the influence of bourgeois extreme individualism...is still present. [...] If we speak of 'mercy' and 'humanism', it will be a great dereliction of our duty...to the cause of socialism."

=== The campaign ===
On 12 October 1983, during the second plenum of the 12th Central Committee, Deng Xiaoping identified several types of individuals and intellectual trends as undermining the party's objectives. On the left, he targeted the remnant leftist ideas of the Cultural Revolution and those who rose to power by following Lin Biao or the Gang of Four. To appease the conservative factions, he then turned to criticize intellectuals and party members who had focused their attention on questions of humanism. Deng criticized humanism as "non-Marxist", saying it "leads youth astray". Deng emphasized the need to combat "spiritual pollution" brought about by liberalization, saying that "People working in the ideological field must not spread spiritual pollution".

Although Deng attempted to warn CCP members against taking extreme measures to rectify problems on the right or the left, almost immediately after the speech, the state-run press began publishing shrill attacks on the bourgeoisie liberal ideas of humanism, and condemning the spiritual pollution that such liberal influences engendered. Deng Liqun, a prominent conservative in the party, was behind the attacks on humanism and spiritual pollution; he called for "spiritual pollution" to be "eliminated" (清除). Deng Liqun's line quickly became dominant throughout state media, causing an intensification of the campaign in social, political and ideological fronts. During the campaign, Deng Liqun has been described as "the conservatives' primary hatchet man", reportedly stemming from his antipathy to General Secretary Hu Yaobang, the party's leading reformist at the time.

The campaign sought to root out bourgeois liberalism viewed as having percolated into art, literature, and society, particularly among urban youths. After the campaign began, reports emerged that local governments had forbidden female staff members from perming their hair or wearing makeup and disciplined individuals who were seen as too xenophilic. Additionally, criminals were executed for offenses that were related to "spiritual pollution". Zhou Yang, one of those who represented "the alienation school" apologized publicly for his "erroneous views", while Hu Qiaomu and Deng Liqun announced on 30 October of the resignation of People's Daily editor Hu Jiwei and his deputy Wang Ruoshui. On 31 October, Xinhua News Agency published an article titled the "Struggle against Spiritual Pollution". Internal directives stated that "The negative phenomena in society, evil trends, criminal behavior, and even some people's hostile activities to oppose socialism are inseparable from spiritual pollution".

Days after the campaign began, international coverage of the excesses of the campaign concerned CCP leaders including Hu Yaobang, who feared the campaign would undermine the willingness of foreign investors and businesspeople to deal with China. On 15 November CCP General Office Director Hu Qili told the new editor of the People's Daily that opposing spiritual pollution should not negatively affect the economic reforms. The following day, an editorial in the People's Daily emphasized "building spiritual civilization". Premier Zhao Ziyang worked with Vice Premier Wan Li to push for the campaign not to apply to economic or agricultural matters. On 25 November, he said that "Opening to the outside world and invigorating the domestic economy are the unswerving policy of the central government. Now we are talking about spiritual pollution and opposing bourgeois liberalism, but this mainly refers to the ideological front. The central government does not use these formulations on the economic front". He continued by saying that while both "ideological front" and "economic front" were important, the goals of the "economic front" were "unswerving" while the campaign against spiritual pollution was temporary.

Deng Liqun quickly embraced "policy boundaries regarding eliminating spiritual pollution". On December 7, Deng gave an internal speech that showcased the campaign spiritual pollution as a long-term and ideational effort, focusing less on "men growing beards, or women perming their hair, high-heeled shoes, and lipstick" and more on "a spirit of bitter struggle". He also placed the entire countryside off limits. On December 13, Hu Yaobang said "Opposing spiritual pollution must not be allowed to arbitrarily expand beyond the scope of Comrade Deng Xiaoping's remarks", leading the room to burst into applause. Hu delivered similar remarks to the leaders of the major propaganda outlets on December 14. On December 31 the CPC Central Committee issued a directive urging caution in dealing with religious issues in the context of "removing spiritual pollution on the ideological front" and reiterating elements of the CCP's policies guaranteeing religious freedom.

On 3 January 1983, Hu Qiaomu delivered a speech at the Central Party School arguing that alienation occurred only in capitalist societies. Deng Xiaoping encouraged Hu's speech's publication in the People's Daily but also told Hu to "allow debate, and don’t hit people with a big stick". Deng met privately with Hu Qiaomu and Deng Liqun at his home on January 18. On January 20, Hu Yaobang urged "vigilance" against people who were "disrupting" economic reform. By January 1984, two months after it began, the campaign against spiritual pollution had effectively ended. On February 11, Hu criticized the campaign and said it led to "overreaching". On March 3, Deng Xiaoping told Bo Yibo that "Eliminating spiritual pollution was completely necessary" and said, "This matter is definitely not over". According to Deng Liqun, when Hu Yaobang again criticized spiritual pollution in February 1985, Deng Xiaoping said "I will not retract my remarks", continuing by saying. "And, in the future, I will still reference this speech."

== Intellectual debates ==
The campaign against spiritual pollution came as a response to an unprecedented public intellectual discussion that heated up in the early 1980s on the question of "alienation" and "humanism". Within the CCP, the term "spiritual pollution" did not have a consensus meaning. Different elements of the CCP used the term differently to characterize behaviors they deemed ideologically unacceptable.

=== Context ===
Humanistic thoughts had long been sidelined by the official discourse in the post-1949 China. As early as in the 1940s, in the Yan'an Rectification Movement, Mao had criticized the idea of what he called "theory of human nature (人性论)" and "love of human (人类之爱)" manifest in the literature by arguing that not until the elimination of class, there can never exist such "all-inclusive love" among human, which is merely an idealistic notion that denies class distinction and speaks for the bourgeoisie. Fifteen years later, starting in another ideological mass campaign that began in 1957, different critiques that had a humanistic tinge among which most noticeable "On Human Nature (论人性)" by Ba Ren (巴人) and "On 'Literature is the Study of Human'" by Qian Gurong (钱谷融) also incurred criticism from the party with the accusation that their advocacy of humanity as the center of literature creation is, again, agitating for "the individualism of the bourgeoisie".

Criticisms on this line didn't cease to emerge until the end of the Cultural Revolution when the public sphere began to reflect on the suppression of human dignity not only in the Cultural Revolution but also throughout the past few decades of socialist experiments. As Wang Jing argues, "What was remembered was not only personal wounds inflicted upon each individual by the Revolution and the Gang of Four--a cliche that outlived its appeal by the mid-1980s--but also the repressed memory of the early history of Marxism, specifically, the humanist epistemology of the young Marx epitomized in his Economic and Philosophic Manuscripts of 1844". ^{:10} A public intellectual debate, as part of a larger movement of cultural reflection, had thus heated up. It was estimated that from 1980 to 1982, there emerged on newspapers 400 plus articles discussing the question of humanism.

The debate emerged at the time when there were three strains of Marxists as identified by Bill Brugger and David Kelly. There were "orthodox Marxist-Leninists", commonly found among power holders in the high establishment; "revisionists", widely regarded by the West as reformists or progressives; and the young humanist Marxists, recognized by a continuously critical voice.^{: 45} All of them, while facing external challenge from the liberals, also experienced internal ideological fragmentation inside the broader Marxist framework^{: 4}, which was in dire need of an "overall guiding ideology",^{: 139} hence the room for the stirring of humanism.

Major works published during the debate
Time of publication or writing	Writer	Title of articles	School
1980.6	Wang Ruoshui	《谈谈异化问题》; 'Discussing the Problem of Alienation'	Humanism
1980.8	Wang Ruoshui	《人是马克思主义的出发点》; 'Man is the Point of Departure for Marxism'	Humanism
1980.8.15	Ru Xin	《人道主义就是修正主义吗？——对人道主义的再认识》; 'Is Humanism Revisionism?--Humanism Revisited'	Humanism
1983.1	Wang Ruoshui	《为人道主义辩护》; 'A Defense of Humanism'	Humanism
1983.3.7	Zhou Yang	《关于马克思主义的几个理论问题的探讨》; 'An Inquiry into Several Theoretical Questions of Marxism'	Humanism
1984.1.3	Hu Qiaomu	《关于人道主义和异化问题》; 'On the Question of Humanism and Alienation'	Anti-Humanism
1984-1985	Wang Ruoshui	《我对人道主义问题的看法》; 'My Views on the Question of Humanism'	Humanism

=== Central issues contested ===
The debate can be roughly divided into two lines of thoughts between what is often referred in Western academia as "the alienation school" represented by Wang Ruoshui and Zhou Yang, and the official discourse represented by Hu Qiaomu, then the member in charge of ideological micro-management in the Central Politburo.

While the two sides both mainly presented their arguments through interpreting original texts by Marx or Engels, they offer two different distinctly views on the continuity of Marx's works. One source that the alienation school often cited was the Economic and Philosophic Manuscripts of 1844, in which Marx developed the theory of alienation, but this work is often regarded by the anti-humanism side as an immature work by Marx, whose theory of alienation later developed into the theory of surplus-value, and is therefore not creditable as Marx's own thoughts. The anti-humanism school thus claimed that there is an epistemological break between the young and the old Marx that undermines the authenticity of the other side's reference to Marx as a whole.^{: 175}

==== "Point of Departure" ====
One of the core questions at the center of the debate is which is the "point of departure" for Marx—humans or social relations? This line of argument started with Wang Ruoshui's assertion that "man is the starting point of Marxism" in one of his signature works. For Wang, as long as the man being [endorsed] here is a "realistic, social, practical" man—that is, one as a member of a given class in a class society, as opposed to the overgeneralized, abstract men in a Feuerbachian sense whose class distinctions are ignored—Wang's conception of Marxism would stand. Hu Qiaomu, in opposition to this idea, argued instead that "social relations" rather than "abstract human" should be the starting point. For Hu, the clarification from the humanist Marxists regarding human as "practical human" is still invalid, for as long as one needs to explain human as "a practical man who engage in real-life activities", one has to start from one's concrete "social relations" rather than "man" itself. Yet for Wang, not all social relations are "the realization of human essence"—those that are alienated are not. Wang also challenged the specious dilemma Hu has artificially created—that is, one has to choose between either choose social relations or humans as the "point of departure", which Wang believes can co-exist in a dialectically united manner.

Based on Wang's argument, Bill Brugger and David Kelly, in their Chinese Marxism in the Post-Mao Era, interpret it as the idea that "A Marxist view of human nature should be not pre-social in the manner of the social contract theorists but trans-social"^{:} ^{161}. According to his view, they add, "we do not come into the world as persons with God-given rights or as utility-maximizing packages," but "with propensities for self-realization and for the achievement of a society where that self-realization may flower" – "the datum of progress is as teleological as it is deterministic"^{: 163}. This interpretation is supported by Wang's own words:

What is "self-realization"? To explain this, we must first understand ... "potential" and "realization". This ... can be traced back to Aristotle: in modern times Hegel ... explained it ... The challenge and development of things are a process from "potential" to "realization"; or, in other words, from possibility to reality. Egg is egg, and chicken is chicken. How can an egg become a chicken? ... The [fertilized] egg ... itself contains the internal cause for becoming a chicken. Therefore, an egg is a "potential" chicken, while a chicken is a "realized" egg.^{: 163-164}

==== Reconcilability with Marxism ====
Another central question is to what extent are Marxism and humanism reconcilable. For Wang and Zhou, Marxism is not equivalent to humanism but it includes the latter; for Hu, the two are distinctively different. At the center of Hu's argumentative framework is a dichotomy he created between humanism as a "historical, world outlook" and humanism as a system of "ethical principles and moral codes". While the former is "fundamentally conflicting" to Marxism, the latter, in so far it is based on the historical materialist framework of Marxism, can be regarded as a "socialist humanism" that can be accepted and popularized. Wang, again, vehemently opposed such artificial dichotomy. For Wang, "humanism is essentially a set of values," one that cannot be separated from worldview and one whose task, beyond that of a worldview, is to make a value judgement of the world for the sake of transforming it, rather than merely an interpretation.

Essentially, according to Bill Brugger and David Kelly's reading of Wang, it is this "need for humans to transform society according to human ends" that qualifies humanism to be not necessarily an idealistic worldview. Wang drew from examples of various Western thinkers ranging from Thomas More to John Locke, all of whom shared an idealistic worldview and recognition of humanism, to argue "humanism takes on different forms in different kinds of society" but "there is a humanism in general". He classifies these theorists as materialists, however, according to their "recognition that humans were the products of society", and as humanists as well because of their "conclusion that society had to be changed as a consequence"^{: 169: 162-163}. Ultimately, Marxism and humanism are compatible for Wang in the sense that there is no necessary linkage between humanism and idealism both as worldviews; humanistic can be a worldview that is materialistic as well.

==== Alienation ====
When it comes to alienation, the central question becomes to what extent can this concept be applied—in particular to a socialist society. Hu, again, created a dichotomy between alienation as a "basic principle", "theory", and "methodology", and alienation as "a concept that reflects certain phenomenons in certain historical periods". While Marx rejects the former definition, Hu argues, he uses the latter also in a limited sense, referring only to a society with intense class antagonism, in particular a capitalistic society. Therefore, according to Hu, alienation can never exist in a socialist society, and the growing application of such concept to certain phenomenons in society is mere abuse.

In sharp contrast, both Wang and Zhou believe that even though "a socialist society is much superior to a capitalist one," alienation can also happen in a socialist society. More specifically, both of them acknowledged the existence of three sorts of alienation—intellectual, political, and economic. Intellectually, alienation is manifest through people's cult of Mao in the previous era, which runs the risk of being dogmatic and detached from the popular masses; politically, the ever-growing state apparatus is susceptible to the corruption, turning from "the servants of society into the masters of society", a prospect that Marx and Engels warned against; economically, the state's well-meaning attempt to enhance economic growth, while disobeying "objective economic laws", can also be dangerous and counterproductive in a long term.

Speaking of possible remedies, Zhou concluded that the origin of alienation is not the socialist system (Chinese: 制度; pinyin: Zhìdù) but merely certain problems within the "establishment" or "institutional structure" (Chinese: 体制; pinyin: Tǐzhì), which he called for reform.

=== Significance and legacy ===
In Brugger and Kelly's conception, the critical elements within the alienation school's theories "have played an important historical role"^{: 169} and that "humanism was in fact taking a new turn in Wang Ruoshui's hands".^{: 165} In Wang's vision, the notion of freedom was "no longer a utopian vision to be realized in the far-off future state of communism", but had come to resemble the democratic institutions of Western countries, a more concrete goal that can be strived for in the present.^{: 165} Since roughly 1985, Wang "has increasingly made him sound like a champion of bourgeois constitutionalism" through close analysis of young Marx.^{: 5} Because of the ideological undertone his view has, Wang came to provide an "important intellectual support" for students who participated in the pro-democracy demonstrations in late 1986 and early 1987.^{: 5}

More broadly, for Brugger and Kelly, the party's silencing of the humanist discourse—as represented by the launch of the campaign and the hardline tone set by Deng's and Hu's speeches—embodied the loss of the last chance for a "genuinely critical Marxism"^{: 5} to flourish in China and, in other words, for the Party to construct an orthodox interpretation of Marxism instead.^{: 169} Had the Party adopted and re-packaged it as the official ideology, Brugger and Kelly argue, it could have avoided the occurrence of another "series of abortive mass campaigns" such as the campaign against spiritual pollution, all of which resembled the destructive, counterproductive movements of the past.^{: 5}

Among the cultural legacies of the campaign was its impact on the genre of science fiction in China. During the campaign, influential people including Qian Xuesen criticized the science fiction genre for promoting irrational and unscientific thinking. This legacy of the campaign is one reason for the comparative predominance of hard science fiction within the genre in China.

=== Limitation and critiques ===
Zhou Yang's view that the presence of alienation shows merely a malfunction of socialism rather than the inherent shortcoming of the system itself became one of the major targets of critiques from later scholars. In her High Cultural Fever, Wang Jing criticized Zhou's "failure to critique alienation from within".^{:18} For Wang Jing, the fact that the alienation school remains theoretically limited stems from their belief that "de-alienation could be achieved simply by resorting to the objective emancipatory means implemented by a revitalized socialist system and an enlightened Party leadership,"^{: 18} while foreign commentators like Jing Wang may suggest that the communist party, which has the monopoly over the materials and course of production, might be "the real problem".^{: 17}

The alienation school's approach also faced challenges from David Kelly, though on a more positive note. For Kelly, who wrote as early as in 1987, there seemed to be a "moral conviction" among intellectuals like Wang Ruoshui to develop, within the framework of Marxism itself, a remedy to the calamities in the fanatical periods of the Great Leap Forward and the Cultural Revolution. Wang Ruoshui's focus was, therefore, more on "values rather than institutions" with the demands he made "designed to minimize conflict with the four basic principles".

== Bibliography ==
- Carrico, Kevin. "Eliminating Spiritual Pollution – A Genealogy of Closed Political Thought in China's Era of Opening". The China Journal, No. 78, July 2017. http://www.journals.uchicago.edu/doi/abs/10.1086/691999
- Hudson, Christopher, The China Handbook: Regional handbooks of economic development: prospects onto the 21st century, Chicago: Fitzroy Dearborn Publishers, 1997.

== See also ==
- Chinese Intellectualism
- List of campaigns of the Chinese Communist Party
- Wang Ruoshui
- Marxist humanism
