= Campaign to Maintain the Advanced Nature of Communist Party Members =

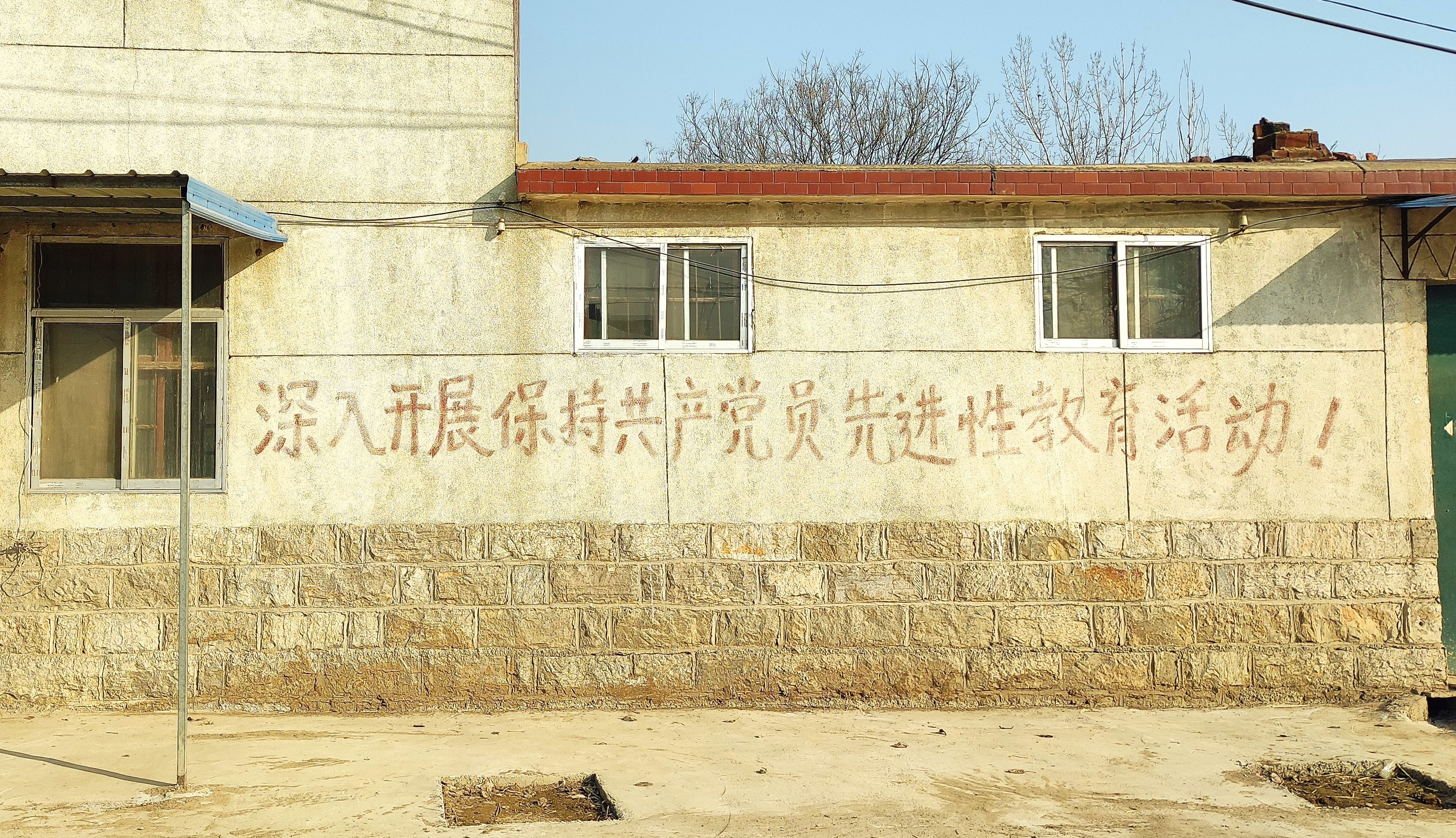
A slogan on a house in Longgu village, Shandong Province

The Campaign to Maintain the Advanced Nature of Communist Party Members (Chinese: 保持共产党员先进性教育活动; pinyin: baochi dangyuan de xianjinxing) is a political rectification campaign launched under the leadership of Hu Jintao. The campaign aims to educate Chinese Communist Party (CCP) members on Marxist ideological orthodoxy, improve "inner-party democracy," and combat corruption and other "social contradictions" that threaten the viability of continued CCP rule. The official Xinhua News Agency wrote that the campaign is "practice for the Party's efforts to promote the great cause of socialism with Chinese characteristics." The campaign was closely linked to Hu Jintao's Scientific Outlook on Development.

In the years following the launch of the campaign, millions of CCP members were made to attend compulsory political education and self-criticism sessions.

== Development ==
The Campaign to Maintain the Advanced Nature of Communist Party Members was alluded to during the Fourth Plenum of the Communist Party leadership in September 2004, and on 1 October 2004, party leadership established a central leading group to coordinate the campaign, led by CCP Organization Department chief He Guoqiang. It was formally launched in January 2005 with the publication of editorials in the People's Daily and Xinhua News Agency.

The campaign was originally intended to be carried out over three phases, spanning 1.5 years. Toward the end of the planned campaign, however, party leaders indicated the belief that the campaign should "become a long-term mechanism in the Party's work."

== Categorization ==
The campaign has been classified as a "rectification campaign" by observers, which would make it the third such campaign since the death of Mao Zedong (the previous two being launched in 1983 and 1998). In a 2005 press conferenced, however, the CCP's Organization Department asserted that the campaign was not a "rectification campaign," but rather an education campaign.

== See also ==
- List of campaigns of the Chinese Communist Party
