= Shen Yang incident =

Sex scandal in China

The Shen Yang incident (simplified Chinese: 沈阳事件; traditional Chinese: 沈陽事件) was an incident in which multiple Peking University students used their verified online accounts to publicly denounce Prof. Shen Yang, former deputy director of Peking University's Chinese Department, Chairman of Nanjing University's School of Literature, Linguistics Department, and recipient of the Yangtze River Scholar award, for sexually assaulting and causing the suicide of a female Peking University student in the 1990s.

== Background ==
In China's higher education system, university and college professors, particularly academic advisors, have increasingly come under fire for abuse of power and improper misconduct. In the larger context of China's emphasis on social and political "stability maintenance", schools and related educational mechanisms frequently suppress the public discussion of students sympathetic to the victims of systematic abuse, have been accused of treating the accused professors with unjust leniency, and allegedly tend not to defend the rights of the students. In the "Tao Chongyuan Incident" (陶崇园事件) one month prior, this suppression of public discourse was exceedingly evident.

Cultural understandings of sexuality and gender in China emphasize female chastity, and as a result, compared to other violent crimes, sexual harassment and sexual assault are more frequently covered up, if reported at all.
