= Chen Pokong =

Chinese writer and political commentator (born 1963)

- Chinese: 陳破空
- Born: December 1963 (age 62); Santai, Sichuan, China
- Other name: Chen Jinsong (birth name)
- Education: Hunan University, Sun Yat-sen University, Tongji University, Columbia University
- Occupations: Author, commentator, activist
- Known for: Chinese political and international affairs commentary

Chen Pokong (Chinese: 陳破空; born December 20, 1963), also known as Jinsong Chen (Chinese: 陳勁松), is a Chinese-born American columnist, political commentator, author, television pundit, and Influencer/YouTuber. Chen played a key role in organizing the democracy movement during the 1989 and 1986 protests in China, for which he was imprisoned and subsequently exiled to the United States.

Before being exiled to the United States, Chen worked as an assistant professor at Sun Yat-sen University in Guangzhou, China. Chen was invited to Columbia University as a visiting scholar in 1996, and later obtained a master's degree of MPA from the School of International and Public Affairs at Columbia University. Since the late 1990s, Chen has been one of the most influential Chinese political commentators, critics and authors. Chen also has been providing commentary for Radio Free Asia since 1997, and had regularly appeared on Voice of America's weekly Pros and Cons show.

Chen has turned to be a YouTuber-YouTube Channel: Chen Pokong-Decoding China, since 2017. By 2025, Chen had held over 456,000 subscribers on . Chen has been a member of the "zi meiti", a campaign known as ‘self-media’ or ‘self-broadcasting’, which came into prominence in 2017 amongst exiled Chinese dissidents. The phenomenon is categorized by the proliferation of routine and online broadcasts on websites such as YouTube.

Chen has been invited to visit Taiwan several times and has met with Taiwanese President Tsai Ing-wen in both 2010 and 2019. In 2009, he was invited to visit Dharamshala, India, where he met with the Dalai Lama and the Tibetan government-in-exile. Chen Pokong has expressed his firm support for democracy in Taiwan and a free Tibet.

Chen was invited to speak at the Oxford Union (2017) and the Cambridge Union(2018), where he delivered speeches and participated in debates. In these speeches and debates, Chen Pokong called for urgent attention to the threat of the Chinese Communist Party (CCP). He emphasized that this was not just a "China Threat," but rather a CCP Threat, which poses a common threat to both the Chinese people and the people of the world.

Chen was invited to speak at the Global Media Forum 2025 organized by Deutsche Welle in Bonn, Germany, July 7-8, 2025. In his speech, he emphasized that the digital firewall established by China's authoritarian regime functions not only as a defensive mechanism but also as an offensive tool aimed at undermining democratic values and institutions globally. He urged major technology and social media companies to cease compromising with authoritarian governments for commercial gain. According to Chen, the digital firewall represents not merely a technical challenge but a fundamental moral and political issue. He called for unified action by the democratic world, grounded in shared values, ethical principles, and technological collaboration, to confront and dismantle such digital repression.

== Early life ==
Chen Pokong (Chinese:陳破空) was born in the Sichuan province of China, Chen is a graduate of Hunan University and a postgraduate of Tongji University in Shanghai. As a postgraduate student in 1985, he submitted a joint letter calling for political reform to former Chinese Communist Party General Secretary Hu Yaobang. As one of the student leaders, Chen then co-organized the massive 1986 Chinese student demonstrations in Shanghai calling for democracy.

== Chinese democracy movement ==
In 1985, as a graduate student in Tongji University of Shanghai, Chen wrote a letter to then General Secretary of Chinese Communist Party Hu Yaobang, a known reformist in CCP, calling for political reform to build up a democratic China. This letter was co-signed by 9 other students at Tongji University. Mr. Hu sent two senior officers to meet Chen and his fellow colleagues in Shanghai and listened to their voices and suggestions.

In 1986, Chen co-founded and co-organized a large scale democracy movement in Shanghai called 1986 Student Movement which spreading to more than 15 cities in China, calling for democracy and anti- corruption in China. Then General Secretary Hu Yaobang was later purged by Deng Xiaoping and other senior politicians, accusing Hu of tolerating the student movements led by Chen Pokong and his fellow colleagues and joined by tens of thousands of students and citizens. The 1986 student movement that happened in Shanghai contributed to the nationwide 1989 democracy movement two and half years later, centered in Beijing, known as Tiananmen Square Protests.

In 1989, Chen initiated and organized a large-scale democracy movement in Guangzhou. After establishing a "democracy salon" in Sun Yat-sen University in January, on April 22, Chen joined Chen Wei, Yu Shiwen and other student leaders in launching student protests in Guangzhou in support of the student protests in Beijing's Tiananmen Square., after Hu Yaobang suddenly died on April 15, 1989. The nationwide protests for democracy lasted for about two months. After the nationwide protests were cracked down by the CCP and its army PLA, Chen was wanted and subsequently arrested by the Chinese government for his leading role in the movement. He then spent the years between 1989 and 1993 in prison and forced labor camps.

=== Imprisonment ===
As a political prisoner, Chen was sent to prison or forced labor on two occasions:

- In August 1989, he was arrested for his involvement in democracy activities. He was charged in February 1990 with "carrying out counter-revolutionary propaganda and incitement." On March 1, 1991, he was sentenced to three years in prison by the Guangzhou City Intermediate People's Court.

From 1992 to 1995, Chen had resumed political activities after his release from prison in July 1992 and was wanted by the government by 1993. He fled to Hong Kong and applied for political asylum but was rejected; after being repatriated, he was sent to forced labor.

- In October 1993, Chen was sentenced again to re-education through forced labor for two years under the charges of "illegally political activities and crossing state borders," a sentence that was carried out without a trial, as is custom with the re-education through forced labor system in China.

In a letter to the international community in 1994, Chen alleged that the prisoners in the Guangzhou No. 1 Reeducation-Through-Labor Center were often beaten and "subjected to conditions which amount to cruel, inhuman and degrading treatment." Chen had the letter smuggled out of the camp in the latter half of 1994, which was reported on by international human rights groups. The letter claimed that production quotas force prisoners to work over 14 hours a day, 7 days a week, with only 3 days of holiday per year. It also claimed that heavy labor was performed during the daytime, including the transportation and loading of stones from a quarry to a boat; at night, prisoners were forced to make artificial flowers for export. The food supplied to prisoners by camp authorities was often insufficient and consisted of "coarse rice and rotten vegetables," according to Amnesty International.

Part of Chen's letter said: "Inmates who labour slightly slower are brutally beaten and misused by supervisors and team leaders (themselves inmates). Inmates are often beaten until they are blood-stained all over, collapse or lose consciousness (shortly before I was sent here, one inmate was beaten to death.)... Many inmates, including myself, their hands and feet squashed by big stones, stained with blood and pus, have to labour as usual. As a consequence, many inmates were crippled for life." In his letter, he said the Guangdong No. 1 Reform Through Labor, Quarry 1, Company 9 in Chini Town, Hua County, was the "most vicious," and that he was sent there so the Guangdong authorities could "vent their bitter hatred on me."

In a House Congressional testimony on the subject of Chinese forced labor, Nancy Pelosi called Chen "a courageous young professor", and characterized Chen's letter as "a compelling appeal for help, relating the terrible tale of ill-treatment and slave labor" in Chinese prison camps. Chen was reportedly the first person and the first political prisoner to provide the United Nations with evidence that the Chinese government and its agencies used forced labor to manufacture products for sale overseas.

== Works ==
Chen was an assistant professor of economics at Sun Yat-sen University in Guangzhou when the 1989 pro-democracy demonstrations began in China. He co-organized the protests and was arrested in 1989. After nearly five years in prison on two separate occasions, Chen was exiled to the United States in 1996. There, he became a visiting scholar at Columbia University, where he obtained an MPA. Chen later built a career as the principal of a business school located in Manhattan, New York.

At the same time, he has been writing for Chinese pro-reform or pro-democracy publications. He is also an author of a number of books on Chinese political culture and international conflicts, mostly published in Japan, Taiwan and Hong Kong.

Chen regularly appears as an analyst on Chinese current affair programs, including Voice of America, Radio Free Asia, New Tang Dynasty Television, SET Taiwan, Radio Los Angeles 1300, Hong Kong Open Magazine, Beijing Spring, and others; speaking at news conferences, panel discussions, and other events; and offering commentary to media. He frequently writes political columns for Radio Free Asia, Hong Kong's Open Magazine, and other publications. In 2007, Chen was awarded the "Prominent News and Culture Award." Chen was an editorial contributor for The Taipei Times. Topics of Chen's analysis include a range of contemporary issues involving modern China and its relationship with the US and the rest of the world. Other topics discussed include human rights, minority issues, official corruption, social instability, economic inequality, military expansion, and cross-strait tension.

== Bibliography ==
- If the U.S. and China Go to War: The Battle of the Senkakus (假如中美开战) (2016)
- The Unwelcome Chinese (不受歡迎的中國人) (2015)
- The End of China's Prosperity, The Curse of Tiananmen Massacre 2019.
- My China Story: Crossing the Sea of Terror 2019.
- Money, Spies and Jackie Chan 2018.
- Trump VS Xi: Duel or Deal 2017.
- To know China, Common Sense Doesn't Work 2016.
- 100 Basic Facts about China, 2016.
- All over the World Do Not Know Chinese, 2015.
- Power Struggle behind Red Wall, 2014.
- Japan, US and China, Coming War in Asia, 2014.
- Inside Story of Red Paper Tiger, 2013.
- If U.S.and China Go to War, 2013.
- Zhongnanhai's Thick Black Theory, (aka Machiavelli in Beijing) 2010.
- A Non-governmental White Paper on the June Fourth Massacre, 2009 (co-author).
- One hundred points of common sense about China 2007.
- China's economy: prosperity under a shadow
- Toward the Republic: A Not-So Distant Mirror, 2003.
- College Boys' Dormitory, a novel, originally published in the Guangzhou "Works" magazine, 1988.
- Gossip, Sensational News, a collection of poems, published by the Guangdong People's Publishing House, 1995.
- Empress Zhao Feiyan, a long historical novel, published by Yuan-Liou Publishing Co., Ltd. in Taiwan, 1999.
- Typhoon, a novel, originally published in the overseas Chinese magazine "Today," 1999.
- Half a Life, a novel, originally published in the overseas Chinese magazine "Today," 2000.

== See also ==
- Chinese democracy movement
- Zhao Changqing
- Wang Dan (dissident)
- Wang Juntao
- Liu Gang
