= One Strike-Three Anti Campaign =

The One Strike-Three Anti campaign (simplified Chinese: 一打三反运动; traditional Chinese: 一打三反運動; pinyin: Yìdǎ sānfǎn yùndòng) was a national campaign launched by Mao Zedong, Zhou Enlai and the Chinese Communist Party (CCP) in early 1970 during the Cultural Revolution. The campaign aimed to consolidate central power by targeting "counterrevolutionaries" and "minor criminals". The "Strike" referred to a crackdown on the activities of "counter-revolutionary" elements in China, while the "Three Antis" were "graft and embezzlement", "profiteering" and "extravagance and waste".

The campaign resulted in a large number of executions and suicides. According to government statistics released after the Cultural Revolution, 1.87 million people were persecuted during the campaign as traitors, spies, and counterrevolutionaries, and over 284,800 were arrested or killed from February to November 1970 alone. Ding Shu, an overseas Chinese scholar, estimated the campaign's death toll to be around 200,000.

== Historical background ==
During the Cultural Revolution, the One Strike-Three Anti Campaign was launched by Mao Zedong and the Chinese Communist Party (CCP) leadership in early 1970, in an effort to consolidate power by targeting "counterrevolutionaries" and "minor criminals". However, the ambiguous and vague definitions of "illegal" behavior later led to a new wave of political persecution, and even the slightest "subversive" behavior including the mere act of meeting with another person, could result in execution.

Another intention of the campaign was to improve China's economic situation and curb the corruption and anarchy in industry. At the end of 1969, production of every major item (with the exception of crude oil) failed to reach its respective target level, and across China production was hindered by continued factionalism and the actions of more radical groupings.

== Course of the campaign ==
In February 1970, the leadership in Beijing announced the start of the One Strike-Three Anti campaign with immediate effect. The order to local authorities in China to 'strike' against 'active counterrevolutionary elements' was issued by Zhou Enlai with Mao Zedong's blessing on 31 January, and the 'Three Antis' ('graft and embezzlement', 'profiteering' and 'extravagance and waste') were unveiled a week later on 5 February. In order for these issues to be effectively tackled, the Beijing leadership called for a national 'tide' of denunciations and the involvement of the 'masses' in the campaign.

However, these fairly vague parameters for what constituted 'active counterrevolutionary elements' led to a situation where interpretations and actions against these elements varied considerably in their definition and in their ferocity, tending to err on the harsh rather than the lenient side. For example, in Yinchuan, three university graduates were arrested and executed for supposed 'counterrevolutionary' activity whilst only pretending to study communist theory (such activity included the desecration of a copy of the Little Red Book), and in Hunan province the outspoken wife of Chen Yun was subjected to "struggle sessions" and solitary confinement for the putting up of two controversial big-character posters. It was also more generally the case that those condemned in the movement were attacked for financial reasons rather than their political views or actions- for example, in Zhabei in Shanghai, only 6% of all cases in the movement were for political reasons.

The crackdowns on unsavory elements in the cities were periodic and therefore known as 'red typhoons'. In Shanghai, under the guidance of Wang Hongwen, these 'red typhoons' occurred on average every two months, and involved the mass mobilization of thousands of police and militia to undertake raids across the city, in the hope of uncovering evidence of 'counterrevolutionary activity'. The ambiguous nature of the wording of the original orders from Zhou Enlai and Mao also meant that in Shanghai (and elsewhere) any small crime could be quickly made into a crime against the 'people'.

== Results and aftermath ==
The One Strike-Three Anti campaign did not have a definite end, as it came to its conclusion at various times across China. In the capital, the proceedings were largely over by the end of 1970, with the report on the campaign reporting the discovery of 5,757 'counterrevolutionaries', the resolving of 3,138 criminal cases related to major crimes and 'counterrevolutionary' activity and the highlighting of over 6,000 cases of the 'Three Antis'. Elsewhere, however, the campaign continued until as late as 1972 or 1973, with it ending in Shanghai in late 1972. According to the official report, 64,000 people from Shanghai and the surrounding area were 'struggled' against. Officially, the CCP reported that over 280,000 arrests of 'counterrevolutionaries' occurred in the first 10 months of the campaign, up to November 1970.

Among the total of 10,402 political prisoners who received "official death sentences" in the Cultural Revolution, the majority were executed in the course of the One Strike and Three Antis Campaign. The campaign also led to a large number of suicides; for example, in Liuyang County of Hunan Province, 186 people committed suicide during the One Strike-Three Anti Campaign and the "Three Dark Lines (黑三线)" Movement.

== See also ==
- Cleansing the Class Ranks
- May Sixteenth elements
- List of campaigns of the Chinese Communist Party
