= Nanjing University Literature School =

University in Nanjing, China

The current Nanjing University Literature School (南京大學文學院 Pinyin: Nánjīng Dàxué Wěnxué Yuàn, briefly 南大文學院 Nándà Wěnxué Yuàn), or School of Liberal Arts, Nanjing University as officially translated, mainly comes from former Department of Chinese Language and Literature, Nanjing University (南京大學中國語言文學系 Nánjīng Dàxué ZhōngGuǒ Yǔyán Wěnxué Xì, briefly 南大中文系 Nándà Zhōngwěn Xì). It's one of the earliest faculties of Nanjing University, with a long history.

== History ==
The history of literature fields at Nanjing University can trace back to the first year of Yong'an reign (CE 258) when the Imperial Nanking University was originated. In the 15th year of Yuanjia reign (CE 438), the independent School of Literature (文學館) was firstly founded, headed by Xie Yuan (謝元), and it's one of the four schools founded by Emperor Wen of Song. In the 6th year of Taishi reign (CE 470), it became one of the five schools of Nanking Imperial University. The literature faculty became part of the Division of Chinese Literature, Language and Foreign Languages (國文外國語部) after the new type school Sanjiang Normal College was established in 1902. The independent Division of Chinese Literature (國文部) was established when Nanjing Higher Normal School was founded in 1915, and currently the authority takes 1914, the year to establish the independent Division of Chinese Literature as the founding year of the department. The Department of Chinese Literature emerged in 1919 which later renamed the Department of Chinese Language and Literature, and it was part of the Division of Chinese Literature, History and Geography (國文史地部), then part of the broad-meaning School of Liberal Arts (文理科, or called 文理學院; broad-meaning, including literature, history, philosophy, mathematics, natural sciences, etc.) in 1920, and later was part of narrow-meaning School of Liberal Arts, or translated as School of Humanities (文科, and then named 文學院; narrow-meaning, including literature, history, philosophy, etc., but not including mathematics and natural sciences). Nanjing Higher Normal School renamed National Southeastern University in 1921, National Central University in 1928 and Nanjing University in 1949.

Nanjing University School of Humanities (or School of Liberal Arts, 文學院) consisted of four departments during the period of National Central University and the earlier years after renamed Nanjing University: Department of Chinese Literature (later renamed Department of Chinese Language and Literature), Department of Foreign Literatures (renamed Department of Foreign Languages and Literatures in 1938), Department of History and Department of Philosophy. The Department of Philosophy was School of Philosophy (哲學院) after 1927, not part of School of Liberal Arts (文學院) before the university was renamed National Central University in 1928, and after being renamed a department it became part of School of Liberal Arts (文學院).

In 1993 the Department of Foreign Languages and Literatures became the School of Foreign Studies, and since around the time, the faculty of Foreign Languages and Literatures along with Department of History and Department of Philosophy has not been part of School of Liberal Arts (文學院). In 2007, Nanjing University Department of Chinese Language and Literature was adjusted, and since then the School of Liberal Arts (or School of Literature, 文學院) consists of four departments: Literature, Linguistics, Philology and Drama Arts.

In modern times, Nanjing University established the first Chinese language faculty. The first PhD in Literature in mainland China was also awarded by Nanjing University.

== Constitutes ==
Constituents of Nanjing University School of Liberal Arts (or School of Literature, 南京大學文學院):

- Department of Literature (文學系)
  - Theory of literature and art
  - Ancient Chinese Literature
  - Modern and contemporary Chinese literature
  - Comparative literature and world literature
- Department of Linguistics (語言學系)
  - Linguistics and applied linguistics
  - Chinese linguistics and philology
- Department of Philology (文献學系)
- Department of Drama and Movie Arts (戲劇影視藝術系)

Besides the school, there is the independent School of Foreign Studies, with languages and literatures in English, French, German, Japanese, Russian, Spanish, etc.. In modern history Nanjing University established the first Department of Western Literatures in China.

== Alumni ==
Some of notable modern alumnus:

- Hu Xiaoshi (胡小石), a renowned modern scholar of classic Chinese literatures and arts
- Chen Zhongfan (陳中凡), a renowned modern scholar of classic Chinese literature, author of the first book of History of Chinese Literature Criticism
- Lu Weizhao (陸維釗), a modern pioneer in calligraphy study and education, the first modern specialized tutor for graduate in Chinese calligraphy
- Tang Guizhang (唐圭璋), a renowned poetry scholar (詞學家)
- Lu Qian (盧前), a renowned poet, writer, theater history critic, verse writer, playwright, scholar
- Wang Jisi (王季思), a renowned drama scholar
- Gao Ming (高明), a literary historian, established the first institute educating doctoral students in Chinese literature, in Taiwan
- Guan Lu (關露), a famous writer
- Shen Zufeng (沈祖棻), a famous classic poet (詞人) in modern times
- Chow Fa-kao (周法高), a linguist
- Sun Jiazheng, chairman of China Federation of Literary and Art Circles
- Vikram Seth, a poet, writer

== Links ==
- 南京大學文學院
