= Campaign to Contend for Excellence =

The Campaign to Contend for Excellence (Chinese: 创先争优活动; pinyin: Chuàngxiān zhēngyōu huódòng) was a campaign of the Chinese Communist Party (CCP) initiated by General Secretary Hu Jintao. Starting from 2010, it concluded in 2012.

== History ==
On May 13, 2010, the General Office of the CCP Central Committee forwarded the "Opinions of the CCP Central Organization Department and the CCP Central Propaganda Department on Deeply Carrying out the Campaign to Create Firsts and Strive for Excellence among Party Grassroots Organizations and Party Members" and issued a notice requiring party organizations at all levels to implement it. In the "Opinions", the campaign to create firsts and strive for excellence is regarded as "an important measure to consolidate and expand the achievements of the party's in-depth study and practice of the Scientific Outlook on Development".

Although there was no official document announcing the end of the political campaign, when the leadership of the Central Leading Group Office visited People's Daily Online on November 9, 2012, to summarize the work of the Leading Group Office, its official website, Leading Group Office, announced that it would stop updating from 24:00 on November 14. This can be seen as a sign of the end of the Leading Group Office.
