= Four Cardinal Principles =

Doctrine of Deng Xiaoping

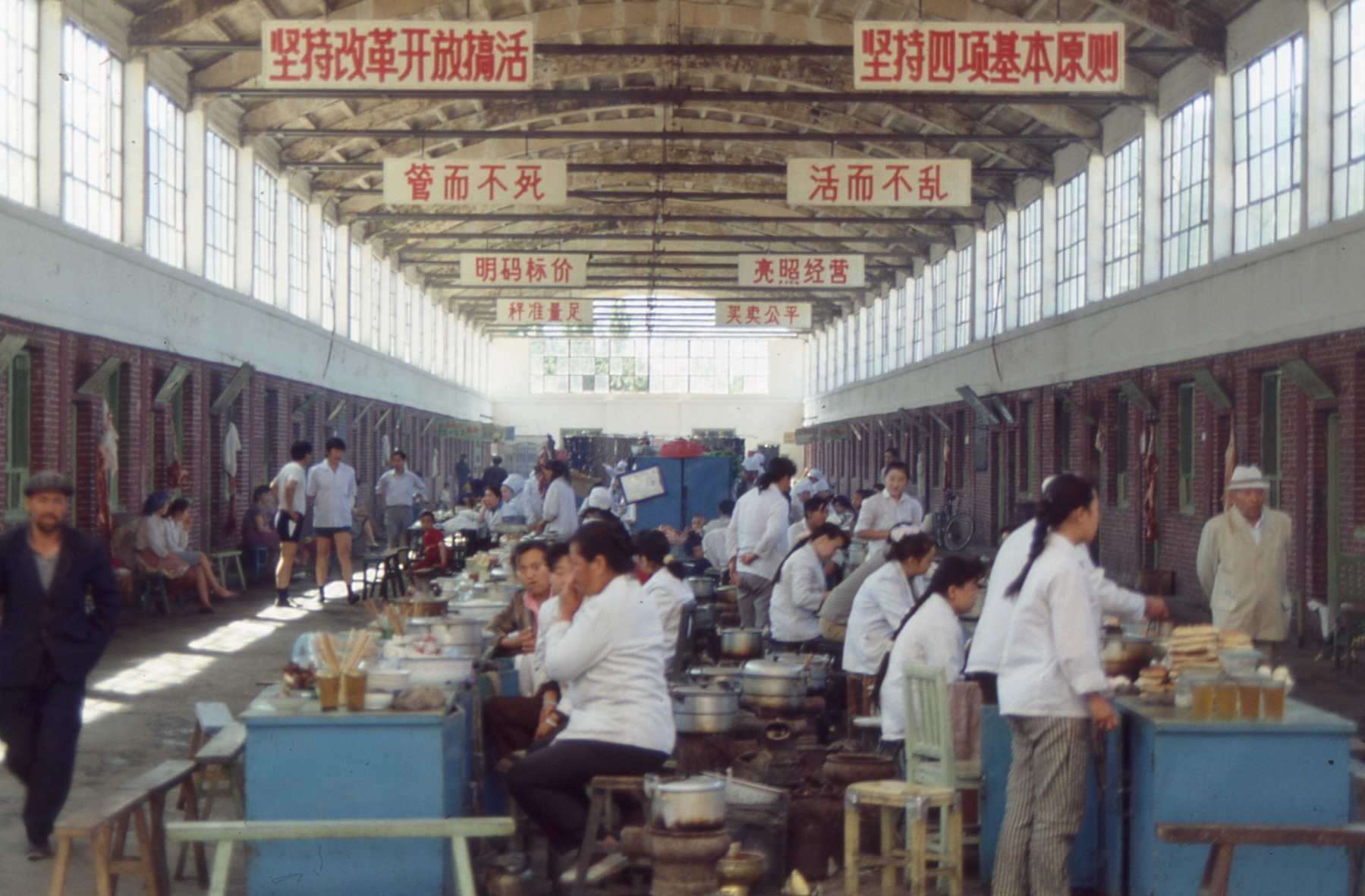
Slogan of "Four Cardinal Principles" in a market in Xinjiang, 1992.

The Four Cardinal Principles (Chinese: 四项基本原则; pinyin: Sì-xiàng Jīběn Yuánzé) were stated by Deng Xiaoping in March 1979 at a conference of the Chinese Communist Party (CCP), during the early phase of the reform and opening up period, and are the four issues for which debate was not allowed within the People's Republic of China. The Four Cardinal Principles were one of Deng's Two Basic Points, the other of which was the reform and opening up.

== History ==
The Four Cardinal Principles were emphasized in the 1981 Resolution on Certain Questions in the History of Our Party since the Founding of the People's Republic of China and were enshrined in Constitution of China in 1982.

== Content ==
The principles include:

1. The principle of upholding the socialist road.
2. The principle of upholding the people's democratic dictatorship.
3. The principle of upholding the leadership of the Chinese Communist Party (CCP).
4. The principle of upholding Marxism–Leninism and Mao Zedong Thought.

== Influence ==
Such principles marked a relaxation of control over ideology. In stating the four cardinal principles, an implication was that these four topics could not be questioned, but political ideas other than those in the list could be debated. Moreover, while the principles themselves are not subject to debate, the interpretations of those principles are.

On the other hand, the principles were proclaimed as a sign of adherence to the communist ideology, thus paving the secure way to reevaluation of the Cultural Revolution while preserving ideological stability and legitimacy of the CCP as a response to the Democracy Wall movement.

== See also ==
- Ideology of the Chinese Communist Party
- Boluan Fanzheng
- Bourgeois liberalization
