= Hu Jiwei =

Hu Jiwei (Chinese: 胡绩伟; August 1916 – September 16, 2012) was a Chinese journalist and a senior Chinese official who served as the president of the People's Daily (1982–1983) and previously its editor-in-chief.

As an influential liberal official, Hu was a long-time champion of freedom of the press and political reforms in China, calling "people's spirit should be above Party spirit (人民性高于党性)". Hu also served as a vice director of the Education, Science, Culture and Public Health Committee of the National People's Congress between 1983 and 1989, but was purged from the central leadership after the Tiananmen Square Massacre in 1989.

== Biography ==
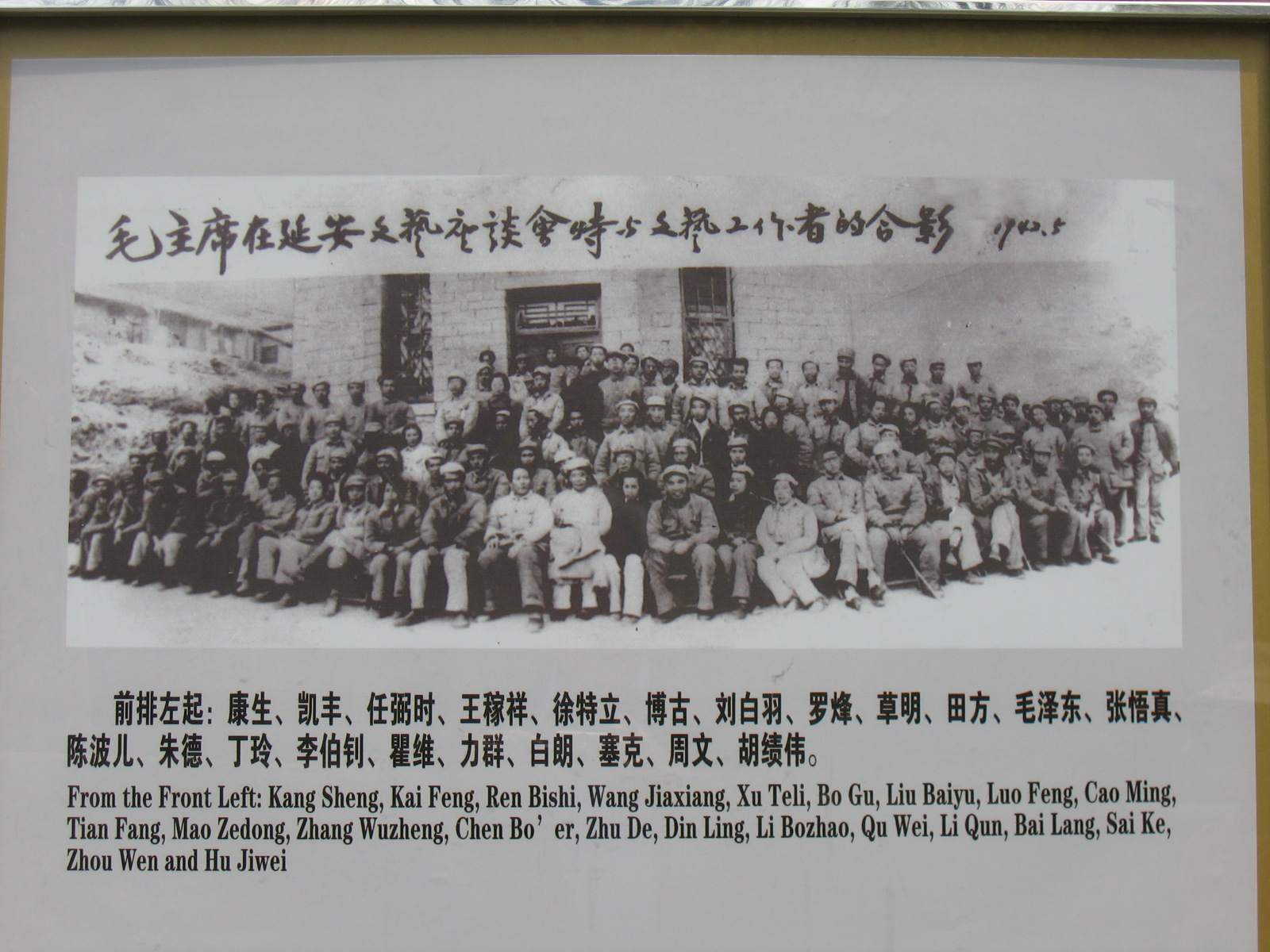
Hu Jiwei (rightmost position on the front row in the picture) attending a conference with Mao Zedong and others in Yan'an in 1940.

Hu Jiwei was born in Zigong, Sichuan in August 1916 (some say September 1916). In 1935, Hu enrolled in West China Medical Center, but transferred to Sichuan University in 1936, when he became an active member in a number of newspaper and magazines. Hu joined the Chinese Communist Party (CCP) in 1937, and in 1939, he travelled to Yan'an and subsequently worked for Jiefang Daily and Xinhua News Agency. After the founding of the People's Republic of China, Hu became a deputy editor-in-chief of People's Daily in 1952, as an assistant to Deng Tuo.

Hu was persecuted during the Cultural Revolution (1966–1976), and soon afterwards was appointed the editor-in-chief of the People's Daily in January 1977 and played an important role during the Boluan Fanzheng period. In the late 1970s, Hu Jiwei said that the "people's spirit" should be primary in doing journalism, meaning that the media should report truthfully because it represented the interests of the people. Hu Jiwei argued in 1979 that "party spirit" should be consistent with human nature media should be independent from the Party, saying the media should be "the eyes and ears of CCP" in order to report accurately on the actual situation in the country and listen to the people's voices. His position was endorsed by reformist leader Hu Yaobang. Hu Qiaomu, in contrast, argued for the primacy of the "party spirit" in media and journalism.

Hu Jiwei worked as the newspaper's president between April 1982 and October 1983, under Hu Yaobang, then General Secretary of the CCP and a leader of reformists within the CCP. However, Hu Jiwei was criticized for his liberal remarks by left-wing conservative figures within the CCP such as Hu Qiaomu, and was forced to resign as the president of People's Daily during the Campaign against spiritual pollution in 1983. Hu Qiaomu continued to argue Hu Jiwei's ideas continued to poison the media after his resignation as editor-in-chief in 1983. After the 1989 Tiananmen Square protests and massacre, Hu Qiaomu argued the failure to properly control the press "guided matters in the direction of chaos".

From 1983 to 1989, Hu served as a vice director of the Education, Science, Culture and Public Health Committee of the National People's Congress, as a member of the National People's Congress Standing Committee, the top legislature in China. In the meantime, he tried to pass laws to protect free press in China, but did not succeed. After the Tiananmen Square Massacre in 1989, Hu was purged from the central leadership. However, Hu continued to support free press and called for political reforms in mainland China.

Hu died at the age of 96 in Beijing on September 16, 2012.

== See also ==
- Wang Ruoshui
- Reform and Opening
- New Enlightenment (China)
