= 1986 Chinese student demonstrations =

Anti-regime protests in mainland China

Student demonstrations took place in a number of Chinese cities from December 1986 until mid-January 1987. The demonstrations started in the city of Hefei before spreading to other cities such as Shanghai and Nanjing. The movement was heavily influenced by the Chinese intellectuals Fang Lizhi and Wang Ruowang, who were critical of the Chinese government's lack of political reforms. The demonstrations quickly dissipated by mid-January before achieving any of its stated goals. The lack of response from Hu Yaobang, who was the General Secretary of the Chinese Communist Party (CCP) at the time, would result in his removal from power on January 15, 1987, and his replacement by Zhao Ziyang.

== Background ==
The 1986 student demonstrations took place in the context of economic difficulties caused by an inflation rate of 16% which led to large increases in living costs. There was also a view that there was corruption within the government which made it difficult for people without connections to get ahead, many of these accusations of corruption targeted the children of Deng Xiaoping. During this time astrophysics professor and vice president of the University of Science and Technology of China Fang Lizhi was giving a series of lectures at universities in Shanghai and Ningbo in which he encouraged to "open in all directions" which meant that he believed that China should open up to the ideals of academic freedom, freedom of speech and freedom of the press that he associated with the West. He also stated that the rights in the Chinese constitution should be "actual rights" and not just on-paper rights. The speeches encouraged many students to use their right to demonstrate and assemble in order to protest the government. Students from around the country were able to listen to these speeches when audio recordings were spread throughout college campuses. In response to these comments Fang Lizhi was pressured to attend a conference in Anhui province where he was heavily criticized by Wan Li and other high ranking provincial officials over his earlier comments.

== Demonstrations ==
The demonstrations began at the University of Science and Technology in the city of Hefei on December 5, 1986, in response to students' demands to nominate their own candidates for the National People's Congress instead of choosing from a government selected list. From there protests spread to other cities such as Shanghai, Tianjin, Nanjing, Kunming, Hangzhou, Suzhou, Guangzhou, and Beijing. On December 19 after several days of protesting the Shanghai government called in the police and ordered them to use force to remove the student demonstrators. In response to the tactics of the Shanghai government, students in Hefei engaged in a sit-in on December 23 in front of the Hefei municipal government building with the demand that the Hefei municipal government rebuke the actions of the Shanghai government. Fang Lizhi, who had a great deal of influence amongst the students, worked as a mediator between the government and students in Hefei and was able to get the students back to class and end their sit-in on the condition that the Anhui officials would forward the student demands to the Shanghai government. According to Fang, his involvement in this instance was later used as evidence by the party that he was the one behind these demonstrations. Throughout the demonstrations, broadcasts by the Voice of America became a key source of information for student protesters.

According to sociologist Julia Kwong, the demonstrations were never able to gain widespread support; the biggest demonstrations in Beijing and Shanghai numbered 30,000 in total and some demonstrations only numbered in the hundreds, such as the protests in Guangzhou. In total 150 Chinese universities out of 1016 took part in the demonstration across 17 cities with 2% of the student population taking part. The goals of the protestors were portrayed in western media like The Washington Post as being a pro-democracy movement but the students had many other grievances that had little to do with democracy and were reported by Hong Kong media. These grievances varied depending on the campus with students in Beijing protesting that lights were turned off after 11:00 whereas students in Nanjing criticized the inclusion of political studies in their curriculum. The protesters also focused on the problem of corruption and cronyism in the government, which affected students abilities to gain employment and slowed Chinese economic growth.

Importantly, Kwong noted that the details of and reasons behind the protest were left deliberately vague, as students were cognizant that attempting to advocate for a multi-party system would bring the ire of the central government down on protesters and lead to a severe response. Instead, the reasoning behind the demonstrations were to showcase activism and a general sense of social consciousness. The reasoning behind this deliberate vagueness is largely attributed to previous attempts of students to sit in on provincial and municipal committees during the Cultural Revolution. While most protesters at the time were too young to have witnessed the chaos amidst the movement, the suffering faced by their predecessors and parents caused enough trepidation that they were reluctant to initiate extreme action. A 1988 article by the South China Morning Post underlined how uncoordinated the efforts behind the movement actually were. The 1986 student demonstrations triggered a wave of protests over the next few years, however protestors were largely reluctant to step forward when called upon to declare the purpose behind their demonstrations. The few who did had differing judgements of the purpose behind the protests. While some cited the reasons as the wave of economic reform initiated under Deng Xiaoping's leadership, others went as far to question the validity of a socialist state. There was no formal consensus or unity. Acts of protest and demonstrations were being encouraged by academic authorities and while students followed the call to action, their attempts at initiating pro-democracy movements were hindered by an unsympatheitc press, which in turn stimulated the fear of government action. While some student demonstrators did hold discussions with the government, they were ineffectual. The Shanghai students were unable to have any of their four demands met after a six-hour meeting with the Chinese Communist Party Committee Secretary of Shanghai Jiang Zemin. By mid-January all of the demonstrations had stopped, and the students returned to their campuses.

== Aftermath ==
The waves of protest came to a head when several thousand students assembled on New Year's Day, disregarding government bans on unauthorised demonstrations. The government adopted a much harder approach, and the official press began to raise campaigns underlining the rise of "bourgeois liberation," initiated by Deng in an attempt to curb excessive liberalisation. Action began with the resignation of Hu Yaobang, from his position as General Secretary on January 16, 1987. His response to the demonstrations was a major factor in him being perceived as being overly liberal by Deng Xiaoping. He was replaced by Zhao Ziyang as General Secretary of the CCP. Fang Lizhi was fired from his position as Vice President of USTC on January 12, 1987, and was subsequently expelled from the communist party on January 19. The removal of Hu Yaobang would have lasting consequences as his removal was used by students during the 1989 Tiananmen Square protests and massacre. Many of the students who took part in these demonstrations would go on to participate in the 1989 demonstrations. Examples are the intellectual and student leaders such as Chen Pokong, Liu Gang, Li Lu, and many others, who participated in both 1986 and 1989 demonstrations.

== See also ==
- Protest and dissent in China
