= Hu Qiaomu =

Contemporary of founders of People's Republic of China (1912–1992)

- 胡乔木
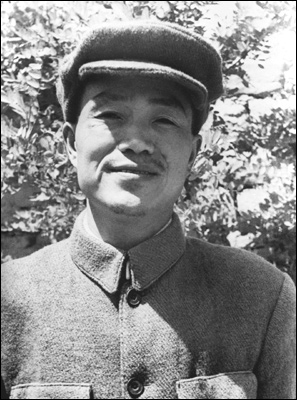
- Born: June 4, 1912; Yancheng, Jiangsu, Republic of China
- Died: September 28, 1992 (aged 80); Beijing, China
- Citizenship: People's Republic of China
- Education: National Chekiang University; Tsinghua University
- Occupations: Private Secretary to Chairman Mao; President of Chinese Academy of Social Sciences; Member of Politburo of the Chinese Communist Party; Permanent member of Central Advisory Commission; President of Xinhua News Agency. Member of Chinese Academy of Sciences.
- Employer: People's Daily
- Organization: Chinese Communist Party
- Known for: Private Secretary for Mao revolutionary Socialist; Communist

Hu Qiaomu (4 June 1912 – 28 September 1992) was a Chinese sociologist, Marxist philosopher and politician.

Hu Qiaomu is a controversial figure for opposing the reform and opening up era of economic reform that followed the death of Mao Zedong. He was a member of Politburo of the Chinese Communist Party, permanent member of Central Advisory Commission, and the former president of Xinhua News Agency. He was an academician of Chinese Academy of Sciences.

== Early career ==
Born in 1912 in Yancheng, Jiangsu Province, Hu graduated from the Department of Foreign Literature, College of Arts and Sciences, National Chekiang University in 1935. Before this, he also studied history at Tsinghua University (in Beijing) during 1930–1932.

Hu was an early member of the Chinese Communist Party (CCP), joining the Communist Youth League of China in 1930 and the CCP in 1932. In the early part of his career, he was, in chronological order, the party secretary (Communist Youth League of China) in Xijiao District, Beiping City (now Beijing) and the head of the Propaganda Department (Communist Youth League of China) in Xijiao District, Beiping City. He was a leader of the anti-Japanese student and worker movement in Beiping. In 1936, he became the general secretary of the Chinese Sociologist League (中国社会科学家联盟), the general secretary of the Chinese Leftism Cultural League (中国左翼文化界总同盟), and a member of the CCP Jiangsu Province Temporary Committee of Labours (中国共产党江苏省临时工人委员会).

Hu's "The Anti-Superstition Outline," a 1940 article, described religion and superstition as the antithesis of science and a tool of class exploitation. Hu described ritual practitioners as using "the morals of prostitutes": whoever paid more got more divine favor. Hu distinguished between ritual practitioners and the masses; the power of the former should be defeated, while the latter should be educated and not alienated.

From 1941 to 1969, he was Mao Zedong's secretary. In the beginning, his secretarial work was mainly focused on culture but later shifted to politics. His secretarial career was ended by the Cultural Revolution.

From October 1, 1949, to October 19, 1949, he was the president of the Xinhua News Agency. He was also the head of the News Office of the People's Republic of China, the vice president of the Propaganda Department of the Chinese Communist Party, the general secretary of the Central Government Culture and Education Committee, and the vice general secretary of the Central Government.

He closely edited and vetted People's Daily.

In 1954, he participated in making the Constitution of the People's Republic of China. In 1956, Hu was elected to be a member of the Eighth Politburo of the CCP and the alternative secretary of the Secretariat of the Chinese Communist Party. In 1977, he became the first president of Chinese Academy of Social Sciences and later on, advisor and the honorary president.

In 1951 Hu wrote "Thirty Years of the Chinese Communist Party". The book emphasised the Mao Zedong's ideological importance, writing that only he was able to correctly interpret and apply Marxism–Leninism to the Chinese situation. It also gave praise and recognition to orthodox Marxism, Joseph Stalin, the Comintern and the Soviet Union, acknowledging their role in the revolution and the formation of the Chinese Communist Party.

== Subsequent career and intellectual contributions ==
Hu was persecuted during the Cultural Revolution and rehabilitated in the 1970s. After his rehabilitation, Hu was involved in developing a new historiographical model for the CCP. Those contributions included an important role in party discussions on how to address the Cultural Revolution.

As vice premier, Deng Xiaoping in 1975 sought to re-orient the Chinese Academy of Sciences towards more theoretical research, which had not been a focus during the Cultural Revolution. Deng assigned CAS vice president Hu Yaobang to draft a plan for overhauling CAS, with Deng and Hu revising the draft, which was issued in September 1974 as "The Outline Report on the Work of the Academy of Sciences". The Outline described scientific research in China as lagging behind the needs of socialist construction and the state of the advanced countries, and stated that to catch up, China should emphasize basic science in order to develop a sound theoretical foundation. This approach to scientific reform fell out of political favor in 1976 when Deng was purged, although it continued to be supported by many members within CAS. A month before Deng's political return in 1977 however, the Outline Report was revived and adopted as CAS's official policy.

In 1977, the Department of Philosophy and Social Sciences was split off of CAS and reorganized into the Chinese Academy of Social Sciences and led by Hu. Deng Xiaoping encouraged Hu to give a speech regarding "objective economic laws", which Hu delivered on 28 July 1978. In 1980, Hu was selected to draft the Resolution on Certain Questions in the History of Our Party since the Founding of the People's Republic of China. In the late 1970s, Hu Qiaomu was strongly critical of People's Daily editor-in-chief Hu Jiwei's idea that the "people's spirit" should be primary in doing journalism, meaning that the media should report truthfully because it represented the interests of the people, in contrast, argued for the primacy of the "party spirit" in media and journalism. He continued to argue Hu Jiwei's ideas continued to poison the media after his resignation as editor-in-chief in 1983. Hu was instrumental in promoting the Second Sino-Japanese War as an academic subject. He successfully led a national-level campaign to open the War of Resistance Museum. In the 1980s, Hu advocated a view of history more accepting of incorporating the Nationalists' contributions during the war. His history of dedication to the party and long-time focus on historiography gave further weight to this approach.

During the 1980s, together with Deng Liqun, he was one of the most important conservative theoretician of the Party. In early 1983, a propaganda directive was issued with Hu Qiaomu's guidance regarding "popularizing science and opposing religious superstition". Hu played a role in the drafting of the Selected Works of Deng Xiaoping and, on 13 July 1983, he delivered an internal speech celebrating its publication. Hu played an important role in launching the Anti-Spiritual Pollution Campaign in 1983. On 30 October, Hu Qiaomu and Deng Liqun announced the resignation of the People's Daily editor Hu Jiwei and his deputy Wang Ruoshui. On 3 January 1983, Hu Qiaomu delivered a speech at the Central Party School arguing that alienation occurred only in capitalist societies. Deng Xiaoping encouraged Hu's speech's publication in the People's Daily but also told Hu to "allow debate, and don't hit people with a big stick". On 26 January, Hu wrote a letter to Zhou Yang, one of those targeted in the campaign, which included a poem that he had written which promised "the wound will heal, and friendship will remain".

Hu also developed a reputation as a major leader on cultural issues. Among other contributions, he provided input on the script of The Song of the Chinese Revolution to improve its historical accuracy. In 1984, while visiting Xiamen, Hu declared that "special economic zones are not special political zones, and whollyowned [foreign] enterprises are not foreign concessions." After the 1989 Tiananmen Square protests and massacre, Hu Qiaomu argued the failure to properly control the press "guided matters in the direction of chaos". In March 1990, Hu declared that CCP history "is not orientated to the past; it is to confront the present and face the future" and "support the leadership of the party". Hu wrote the speech for CCP General Secretary Jiang Zemin for the 70th Anniversary of the CCP in July 1991. He died in 1992.
