= Krasnokamensk Urban Settlement =

Krasnokamensk Urban Settlement is the name of several municipal formations in Russia.

- Krasnokamensk Urban Settlement, a municipal formation which the Work Settlement of Krasnokamensk in Kuraginsky District of Krasnoyarsk Krai is incorporated as
- Krasnokamensk Urban Settlement, a municipal formation which the town of Krasnokamensk and the settlement of Oktyabrsky in Krasnokamensky District of Zabaykalsky Krai are incorporated as

== See also ==
- Krasnokamensk (disambiguation)
