= Tselinny, Zabaykalsky Krai =

Tselinny Целинный
- Selo
- Location within Zabaykalsky Krai Location within Russia
- Coordinates: 50°15′N 118°06′E
- Country: Russia
- Region: Zabaykalsky Krai
- District: Krasnokamensky District
- Time zone: UTC+9:00

Tselinny (Russian: Целинный) is a rural locality (a selo) in Krasnokamensky District, Zabaykalsky Krai, Russia. Population: 1,021 (2021 census); 1,548 (2010 census); 1,683 (2002 census); There are 14 streets in this selo.

== Geography ==
This rural locality is located 20 km from Krasnokamensk (the district's administrative centre), 383 km from Chita (capital of Zabaykalsky Krai) and 5,754 km from Moscow. Urulyunguy is the nearest rural locality.
