= Sredneargunsk =

Sredneargunsk Среднеаргунск
- Selo
- Location within Zabaykalsky Krai Location within Russia
- Coordinates: 49°44′N 118°15′E
- Country: Russia
- Region: Zabaykalsky Krai
- District: Krasnokamensky District
- Time zone: UTC+9:00

Sredneargunsk (Russian: Среднеаргунск) is a rural locality (a selo) in Krasnokamensky District, Zabaykalsky Krai, Russia. Population: 200 (2021 census); 200 (2010 census); 200 (2002 census); There are 9 streets in this selo.

== Geography ==
This rural locality is located 42 km from Krasnokamensk (the district's administrative centre), 426 km from Chita (capital of Zabaykalsky Krai) and 5,833 km from Moscow. Kaylastuy is the nearest rural locality.
