= Kaptsegaytuy =

Kaptsegaytuy Капцегайтуй
- Selo
- Location within Zabaykalsky Krai Location within Russia
- Coordinates: 49°57′N 118°35′E
- Country: Russia
- Region: Zabaykalsky Krai
- District: Krasnokamensky District
- Time zone: UTC+9:00

Kaptsegaytuy (Russian: Капцегайтуй) is a rural locality (a selo) in Krasnokamensky District, Zabaykalsky Krai, Russia. Population: 254 (2021 census); 467 (2010 census); 800 (2002 census); There are 16 streets in this selo.

== Geography ==
This rural locality is located 43 km from Krasnokamensk (the district's administrative centre), 432 km from Chita (capital of Zabaykalsky Krai) and 5,829 km from Moscow. Bogdanovka is the nearest rural locality.
