= Margutsek =

Margutsek Маргуцек
- Selo
- Location within Zabaykalsky Krai Location within Russia
- Coordinates: 50°24′N 117°53′E
- Country: Russia
- Region: Zabaykalsky Krai
- District: Krasnokamensky District
- Time zone: UTC+9:00

Margutsek (Russian: Маргуцек) is a rural locality (a selo) in Krasnokamensky District, Zabaykalsky Krai, Russia. Population: 765 (2021 census); 1,215 (2010 census); 990 (2002 census); There are 8 streets in this selo.

== Geography ==
This rural locality is located 36 km from Krasnokamensk (the district's administrative centre), 361 km from Chita (capital of Zabaykalsky Krai) and 5,721 km from Moscow. Klichka is the nearest rural locality.
