= Krasnokamensk (urban locality) =

Krasnokamensk (Russian: Краснокаменск) is the name of several urban localities in Russia:

- Krasnokamensk, Zabaykalsky Krai, a town in Krasnokamensky District of Zabaykalsky Krai
- Krasnokamensk, Krasnoyarsk Krai, a work settlement in Kuraginsky District of Krasnoyarsk Krai
