= Brusilovka =

Brusilovka Брусиловка
- Selo
- Location within Zabaykalsky Krai Location within Russia
- Coordinates: 50°24′N 117°10′E
- Country: Russia
- Region: Zabaykalsky Krai
- District: Krasnokamensky District
- Time zone: UTC+9:00

Brusilovka (Russian: Брусиловка) is a rural locality (a selo) in Krasnokamensky District, Zabaykalsky Krai, Russia. Population: 84 (2021 census); 161 (2010 census); 226 (2002 census); There are 7 streets in this selo.

== Geography ==
This rural locality is located 46 km from Krasnokamensk (the district's administrative centre), 418 km from Chita (capital of Zabaykalsky Krai) and 5,825 km from Moscow. Rudnik Abagaytuy is the nearest rural locality.
