= Soktuy-Milozan =

Soktuy-Milozan Соктуй-Милозан
- Selo
- Location within Zabaykalsky Krai Location within Russia
- Coordinates: 50°04′N 117°46′E
- Country: Russia
- Region: Zabaykalsky Krai
- District: Krasnokamensky District
- Time zone: UTC+9:00

Soktuy-Milozan (Russian: Соктуй-Милозан) is a rural locality (a selo) in Krasnokamensky District, Zabaykalsky Krai, Russia. Population: 303 (2021 census); 625 (2010 census); 774 (2002 census); There are 14 streets in this selo.

== Geography ==
This rural locality is located 18 km from Krasnokamensk (the district's administrative centre), 375 km from Chita (capital of Zabaykalsky Krai) and 5,755 km from Moscow. Krasnokamensk is the nearest rural locality.
