= Kuytun, Zabaykalsky Krai =

Kuytun Куйтун
- Settlement
- Location within Zabaykalsky Krai Location within Russia
- Coordinates: 50°24′N 117°10′E
- Country: Russia
- Region: Zabaykalsky Krai
- District: Krasnokamensky District
- Time zone: UTC+9:00

Kuytun (Russian: Куйтун) is a rural locality (a settlement) in Krasnokamensky District, Zabaykalsky Krai, Russia. Population: 284 (2021 census); 313 (2010 census); 340 (2002 census); There are 5 streets in this selo.

== Geography ==
This rural locality is located 44 km from Krasnokamensk (the district's administrative centre), 414 km from Chita (capital of Zabaykalsky Krai) and 5,792 km from Moscow. Pogadayevo is the nearest rural locality.
