= Aramogoytuy =

Aramogoytuy Арамогойтуй
- Settlement
- Location within Zabaykalsky Krai Location within Russia
- Coordinates: 50°22′N 117°36′E
- Country: Russia
- Region: Zabaykalsky Krai
- District: Krasnokamensky District
- Time zone: UTC+9:00

Aramogoytuy (Russian: Арамогойтуй) is a rural locality (a settlement) in Krasnokamensky District, Zabaykalsky Krai, Russia. Population: 77 (2021 census); 86 (2010 census);

== Geography ==
This rural locality is located 44 km from Krasnokamensk (the district's administrative centre), 344 km from Chita (capital of Zabaykalsky Krai) and 5,703 km from Moscow. Kovyli is the nearest rural locality.
