= Krasnokamensk =

Krasnokamensk may refer to:

- Krasnokamensk (urban locality), several urban localities in Russia
- Krasnokamensk Urban Settlement, several municipal urban settlements in Russia
- Krasnokamensk Airport, an airport in Zabaykalsky Krai, Russia
