= Yevgeni Malofeyev =

Russian footballer

Personal information
- Full name: Yevgeni Veniaminovich Malofeyev
- Date of birth: 27 March 1993 (age 33)
- Place of birth: Krasnokamensk, Russia
- Height: 1.89 m (6 ft 2 1/2 in)
- Position: Goalkeeper

Senior career*
Years	Team	Apps	(Gls)
2012	FC Sibir-2 Novosibirsk	10	(0)
2013–2014	FC Sibir Novosibirsk	14	(0)
2014–2015	FC Dynamo Barnaul	21	(0)
2015	FC Novokuznetsk	10	(0)
2016	FC Strogino Moscow	16	(0)
2017–2019	FC Luki-Energiya Velikiye Luki	20	(0)
- * Club domestic league appearances and goals

Yevgeni Veniaminovich Malofeyev (Russian: Евгений Вениаминович Малофеев; born 27 April 1993) is a Russian former football goalkeeper.

== Club career ==
He made his debut in the Russian Second Division for FC Sibir-2 Novosibirsk on 27 August 2012 in a game against FC Chita.

He made his Russian Football National League debut for FC Sibir Novosibirsk on 11 March 2013 in a game against FC Ufa.
