= Kaylastuy =

Kaylastuy Кайластуй
- Selo
- Location within Zabaykalsky Krai Location within Russia
- Coordinates: 49°49′N 118°24′E
- Country: Russia
- Region: Zabaykalsky Krai
- District: Krasnokamensky District
- Time zone: UTC+9:00

Kaylastuy (Russian: Кайластуй) is a rural locality (a selo) in Krasnokamensky District, Zabaykalsky Krai, Russia. Population: 447 (2021 census); 808 (2010 census); 1,044 (2002 census); There are 12 streets in this selo.

== Geography ==
This rural locality is located 39 km from Krasnokamensk (the district's administrative centre), 428 km from Chita (capital of Zabaykalsky Krai) and 5,831 km from Moscow. Sredneargunsk is the nearest rural locality.
