= Bogdanovka, Zabaykalsky Krai =

Bogdanovka Богдановка
- Selo
- Location within Zabaykalsky Krai Location within Russia
- Coordinates: 50°00′N 118°45′E
- Country: Russia
- Region: Zabaykalsky Krai
- District: Krasnokamensky District
- Time zone: UTC+9:00

Bogdanovka (Russian: Богдановка) is a rural locality (a selo) in Krasnokamensky District, Zabaykalsky Krai, Russia. Population: 372 (2021 census); 540 (2010 census); 742 (2002 census); There are 6 streets in this selo.

== Geography ==
This rural locality is located 53 km from Krasnokamensk (the district's administrative centre), 438 km from Chita (capital of Zabaykalsky Krai) and 5,834 km from Moscow. Duroy is the nearest rural locality.
