= Richard Fuller (environmentalist) =

- Born: 1960 (age 65–66)
- Education: Engineering, Melbourne University
- Occupations: Engineer, environmentalist, entrepreneur
- Organization(s): Pure Earth, The Lancet Commission on Pollution and Health, Global Alliance on Health and Pollution, Great Forest

Richard Fuller OAM (born 1960) is an Australian-born, United States-based engineer, entrepreneur, and environmentalist known for his work in pollution remediation.

He was founder and President of the nonprofit Pure Earth (formerly known as Blacksmith Institute), Co-Chair of The Lancet Commission on Pollution and Health, and the Co-Chair of the Pure Earth-founded group the Global Alliance on Health and Pollution. Fuller also founded and serves as the president of waste management consultancy firm Great Forest. Fuller stepped down from the president and CEO roles at Pure Earth on 4 Nov 2024 and continues his ongoing work on pollution with the Global Toxics Research Initiative and Columbia University.

== Early career ==
Richard Fuller graduated with a degree in Engineering from Melbourne University. Following university, he worked for IBM. He left Australia in 1988 to work in the Amazon rainforest of Brazil with the United Nations Environment Programme for two years.

In 1989, he established New York City-based waste management consultancy firm Great Forest.

== Pure Earth ==
Despite the success of Great Forest, Fuller felt that there was more he can do to bring about meaningful environmental change. In 1999, Fuller established Pure Earth (formerly known as Blacksmith Institute) to focus on pollution remediation. Fuller used profits from Great Forest to launch the nonprofit Pure Earth to tackle the problem on a larger scale. A portion of Great Forest's profits continues to support Pure Earth's work.

Pure Earth largely focuses on remediating toxic pollution in developing countries, as well as identifying and documenting toxic sites. Pure Earth states that it has identified nearly 5,000 toxic sites throughout more than 50 countries, and offers a database outlining its findings. Pure Earth has completed over 120 cleanup pilot projects in 24 countries. The group also organizes workshops to train investigators and government representatives, and says it has trained over 400 investigators and 90 government representatives.

The organization has developed a metric to provide a basic quantitative evaluation of the risk associated with an identified toxic site, known as the Blacksmith Index. Fuller developed this index in collaboration with Johns Hopkins University.He also developed the Lead Burden Index, a way to measure the impact of a particular source of lead, the Rapid Marketplace Survey, a means to find sources of lead in markets, and a Homes Assessment tool for houses.

Pure Earth also offers a website which provides global data on lead pollution.

== Involvement with other organizations ==
Global Toxics Research Initiative (GRIT)

In 2026, Fuller created GRIT, an organization focused on researching toxic chemicals and their public health impact. Working with global experts, governments and local agencies GRIT leads research around the world to develop and implement solutions to toxic exposures. A key purpose of the organization is to provide tools and resources for those working on these problems.

=== Global Alliance on Health and Pollution ===
In 2012, Fuller convened the Global Alliance on Health and Pollution, an organization meant to bring together experts from different countries to tackle global pollution, and provide technical know-how to developing countries. Fuller serves as the organization's Co-Chair.

In 2014, Fuller, on behalf of the Global Alliance on Health and Pollution, called on the United Nations to spotlight pollution in the Sustainable Development Goals.

=== Lancet Commission on Pollution and Health ===
In 2017, Fuller began serving as the Co-Chair of the Lancet Commission on Pollution and Health, an initiative of The Lancet, the Global Alliance on Health and Pollution, and the Icahn School of Medicine at Mount Sinai, with additional coordination and input from the United Nations Environment Programme, the United Nations Industrial Development Organization, and the World Bank.

The Commission brought together over 40 international health and environmental authors, and produced a report in 2017 providing what it claimed to be the first comprehensive estimates of the effects of global pollution on health and economy worldwide. The report concluded that pollution is the largest environmental cause of death in the world, killing over 9 million people worldwide, threatening the "continuing survival of human societies." A follow-up report was published in 2022.

The report received news coverage from outlets including the Guardian, PBS NewsHour and CNN's Fareed Zakaria.

In an open letter to mark the release of the report from The Lancet Commission on Pollution and Health, Fuller writes: "For too long, pollution has been sidelined, overshadowed, ignored by the world, in part because it is a complicated topic with many causes, and as many outcomes. Often it kills slowly, and indirectly, hiding its tracks. With this report, we bring pollution out of the shadows".

Fuller was invited to present the report's findings at the World Economic Forum meeting in Davos in February 2018. He was also invited to provide briefings of the report at the World Bank, the United Nations, the National Academies of Sciences, Engineering, and Medicine, and the OECD.

=== Global Observatory on Pollution and Health ===
In October 2018, Fuller joined former EPA Administrator Gina McCarthy, Erik Solheim and Pushpam Kumar of the United Nations Environmental Programme, and Philip J. Landrigan of Boston College at the launch of the Global Observatory on Pollution and Health.

== Other advocacy ==
Fuller's focus is not on pollution in general, but more specifically on disease-causing pollution that impacts the health of people, especially those living in low- and middle-income countries.

Through Pure Earth and the Global Alliance on Health and Pollution, Fuller lobbied the United Nations to provide more detail relating to its pollution goals in its Sustainable Development Goals (SDGs). Fuller was dissatisfied with the initial SDGs, saying that "we were all worried about a year and half ago that there was nothing listed of any substance about pollution in the SDGs. It was sparse, at best". Ultimately, Fuller and his groups were successful, and he said "we managed to get a target written in — 3.9 — within the health goal that says we need to substantially reduce death and disability from all types of pollution. That means contaminated sites, air, water, and ground pollution from chemicals".

Fuller gave a speech to World Bank in 2018, in which he said that "toxic pollution is the largest cause of death in the world. Yet it is one of the most underreported and underfunded global problems".

== Publications ==
=== The Brown Agenda ===
He is co-author of The Brown Agenda: My Mission To Clean up The World's Most Life-Threatening Pollution, alongside Damon DiMarco. The book was published in 2015 by the Santa Monica Press. The book documents Fuller's adventures at some of the world's most toxic locations, and introduces readers to the plight of the poisoned poor, suggesting specific ways in which anyone can help combat brown sites all over the world.

In a 2015 interview about the book on The Takeaway on NPR, Fuller noted the differences in approaches to climate change and pollution: "... over the last couple of decades, climate change has taken over as the key environmental issue. So now we find that the agenda of these countries is biodiversity and climate change, and pollution has simply dropped off the map. This is an extraordinary result and one we really need to turn around".

"We've already solved most of the pollution problems in the West. There aren't people dying in droves in the U.S. or in England - they're all dying overseas, in low- and middle-income countries," he told the Thomson Reuters Foundation on the publication of the book.

=== Other pieces ===
In 2017, Richard Fuller co-authored a piece with Philip J. Landrigan published in the UN Perspectives series, titled "The Impact of Pollution on Planetary Health: Emergence of an Underappreciated Risk Factor".

In 2019, he co-authored Pollution and Children's Health, which noted that "pollution was responsible in 2016 for 940,000 deaths in children, two-thirds under age 5," and that "92% of pollution-related deaths in children occur in low- and middle-income countries". He concluded in the piece that "pollution prevention presents a major, largely unexploited opportunity to improve children’s health especially in low and middle-income countries".

== Views ==
Fuller believes that much of pollution can be solved. Fuller told the Associated Press in 2006 that "we have known technologies and proven strategies for eliminating a lot of this pollution". In 2010 he told Time that "there’s a finite number of polluted sites out there, and you can fix them for relatively little". In a 2015 opinion piece, Fuller wrote that the problems of pollution "are fixable", and that when issues related to pollution are addressed "the biggest single source of death on the planet — let alone an enormous drain on human and environmental well-being, not to mention economic growth — will be vanquished".

== Recognition ==
In October 2022, Richard Fuller was included in the Future Perfect 50 list from Vox, recognizing “the scientists, thinkers, scholars, writers, and activists building a more perfect future”.

In June 2018, Fuller was awarded the Order of Australia Medal (OAM) in recognition of his service to conservation and the environment.

In October 2019, Fuller received an Advance Award for Social Impact from the Australian government for his 20 years of pioneering work with Pure Earth and his leadership in tacking the issue as "a toxic pollution fighting hero".
