= Separation barrier =

Type of wall separating peoples, administrative units or cultures

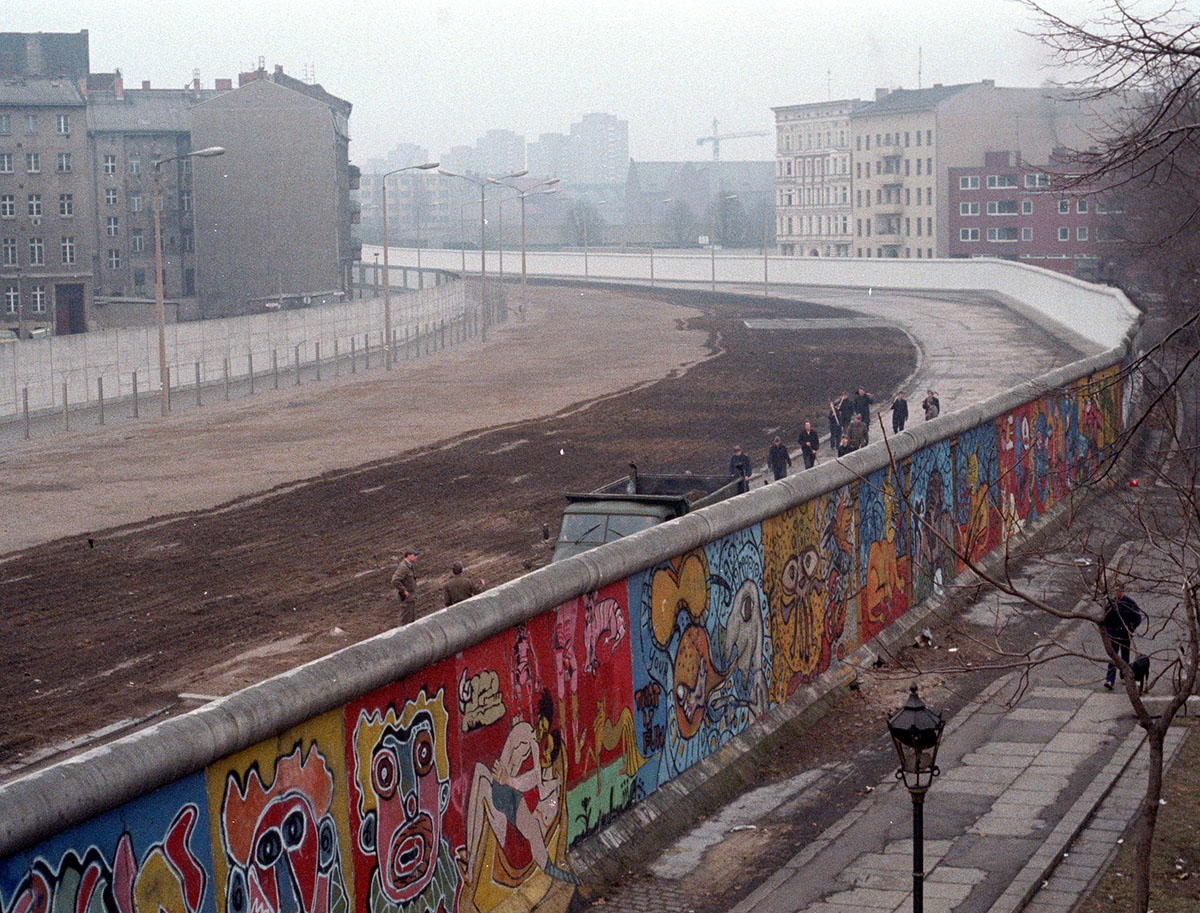
The Berlin Wall divided Berlin from 1961 until 1989, and was demolished between 1990 and 1992, (seen here in 1986 of the Bethaniendamm section in the Friedrichshain-Kreuzberg borough)

A separation barrier or separation wall is a barrier, wall or fence, constructed to limit the movement of people across a certain line or border, or to separate peoples or cultures. A separation barrier that runs along an internationally recognized border is known as a border barrier.

David Henley opines in The Guardian that separation barriers are being built at a record-rate around the world along borders and do not only surround dictatorships or pariah states. In 2014, The Washington Post listed notable 14 separation walls as of 2011, indicating that the total concurrent number of walls and barriers which separate countries and territories is 45.

The term "separation barrier" has been applied to structures erected in Belfast, Homs, the West Bank, São Paulo, Cyprus, and along the Greece-Turkey border and the Mexico-United States border. In 2016, Julia Sonnevend listed in her book Stories Without Borders: The Berlin Wall and the Making of a Global Iconic Event the concurrent separation barriers of Sharm el-Sheikh (Egypt), Limbang border (Brunei), the Kazakh-Uzbekistan barrier, Indian border fence with Bangladesh, United States separation barrier with Mexico, Saudi Arabian border fence with Iraq and Hungary's fence with Serbia. Several erected separation barriers are no longer active or in place, including the Berlin Wall, the Maginot Line and some barrier sections in Jerusalem.

== Structures described as "separation barriers" or "separation walls" ==
=== Australia ===
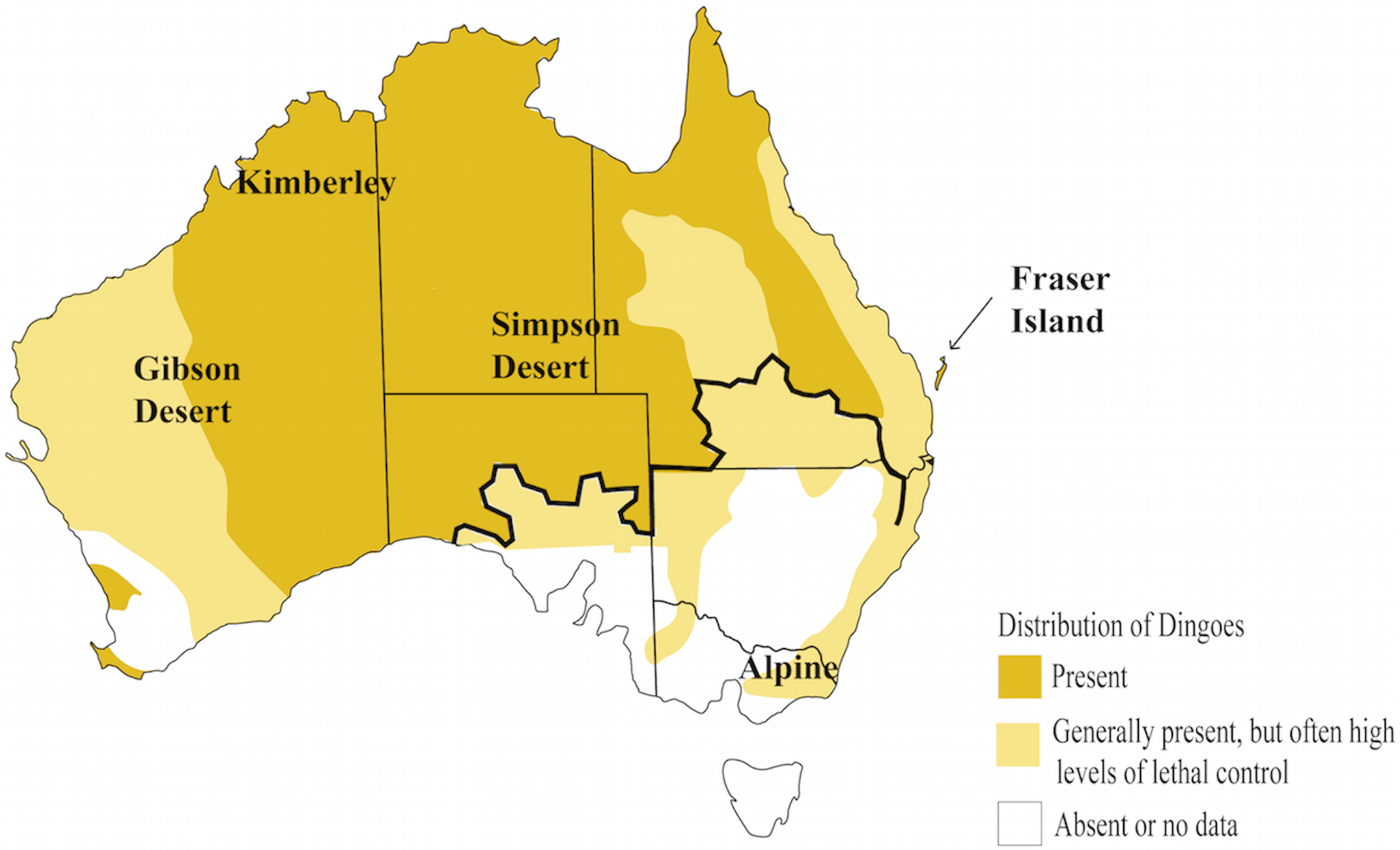
The black line represents the Dingo Fence

One of the longest separation barriers in the world, the dingo fence is a pest-exclusion fence to keep dingoes out of the relatively fertile south-east part of the continent. In addition, it was initially established so that landowners could lawfully keep Australian Aboriginal people off the land.

Although the fence has helped reduce losses of sheep to predators, this has been countered by holes in fences found in the 1990s through which dingo offspring have passed. Laws were appointed to protect the fence; jail terms of three months for leaving a crossing gate open, and six months for damage or removal of part of the fence. Introduced in 1946, these penalties still apply today.

In 2009 as part of the Q150 celebrations, the dingo fence was announced as one of the Q150 Icons of Queensland for its role as an iconic "innovation and invention". The fence staff consists of 23 employees, including two-person teams that patrol a 300 km (186 mi) section of the fence twice every week.

=== Central Europe ===
Communities in the Czech Republic, Romania and Slovakia have long built Roma walls in urban environments when a Roma group is in close proximity to the rest of the population.

=== Cyprus ===
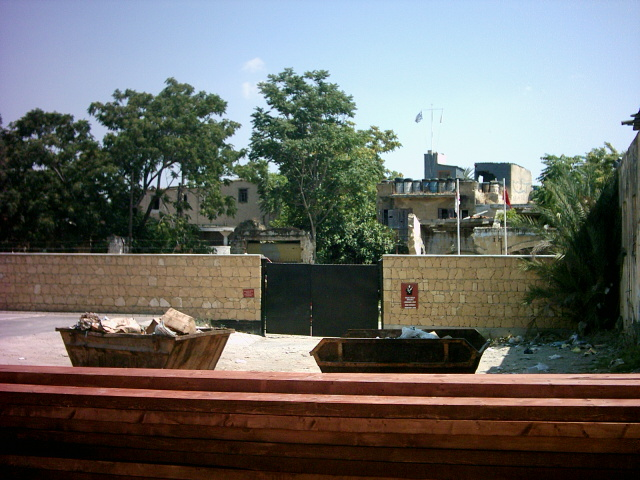
Green Line separation barrier, Cyprus

Since the Turkish invasion of Cyprus in 1974, Turkey has constructed and maintained what economics professor Rongxing Guo has called a "separation barrier" of 300 kilometres (190 mi) along the 1974 Green Line (or ceasefire line) dividing the island of Cyprus into two parts, with a United Nations buffer zone between them.

=== Egypt ===
==== Egypt-Gaza barrier ====
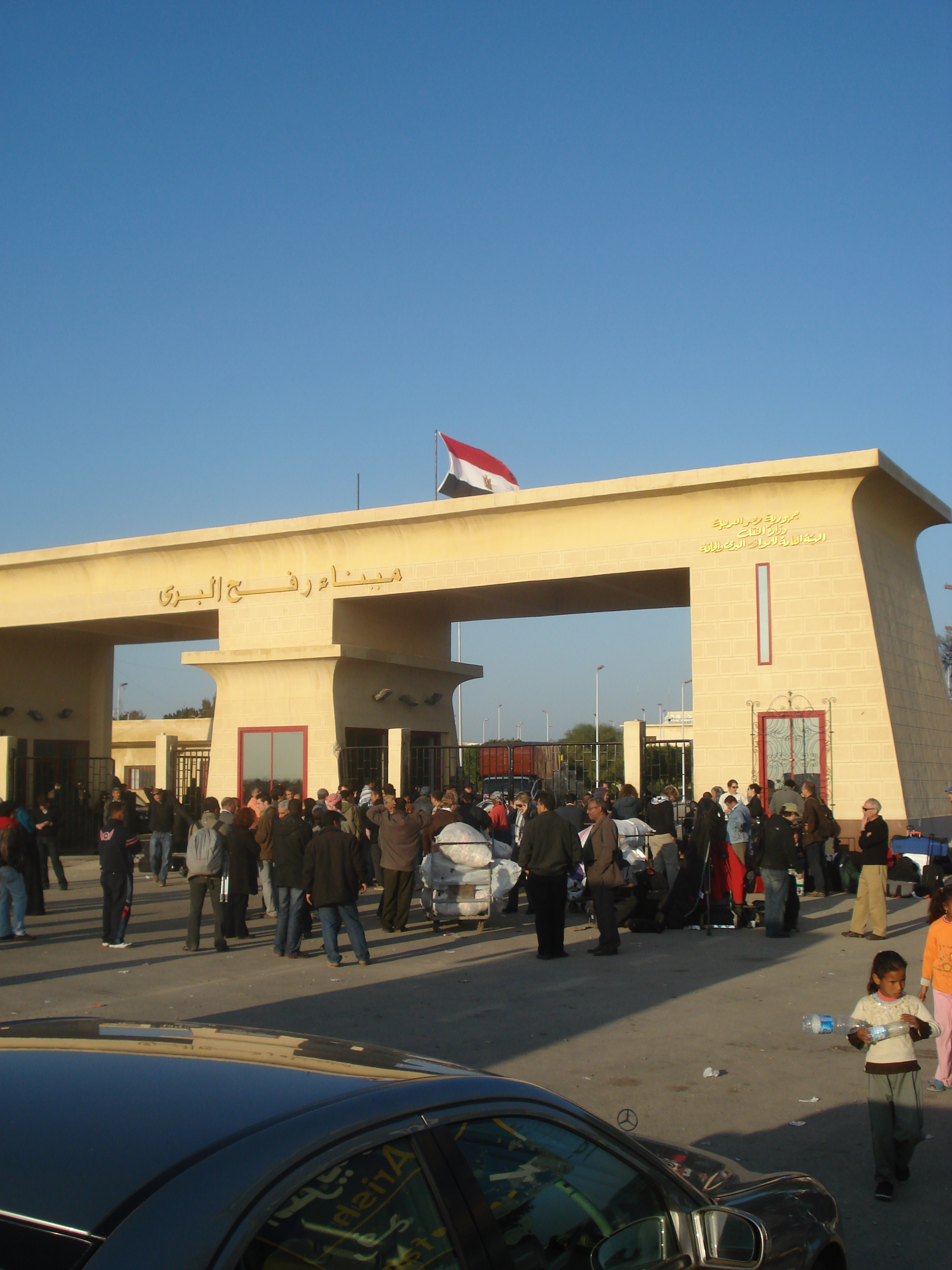
Rafah Border Crossing

The Egypt–Gaza barrier is often referred as "separation barrier" in the media or as a "separating wall". In December 2009, Egypt started the construction of the Egypt–Gaza barrier along the border with Gaza, consisting of a steel wall. Egypt's foreign minister said that the wall, being built along the country's border with the Gaza Strip will defend it "against threats to national security". Though the construction paused a number of times, the wall is nearly complete.

==== Sharm el-Sheikh barrier ====
According to Julia Sonnevend, the anti-terrorist barrier around the Sharm el-Sheikh resort in Egypt is in fact a separation barrier.

=== India ===
The Line of Control (LoC) refers to the military control line between the Indian and Pakistani controlled parts of the former princely state of Kashmir and Jammu—a line which, to this day, does not constitute a legally recognized international boundary, but is the de facto border. Originally known as the Cease-fire Line, it was redesignated as the "Line of Control" following the Simla Agreement, which was signed on 3 July 1972. The part of the former princely state that is under Indian control is administered as the union territories of Jammu and Kashmir and Ladakh. The two parts of the former princely state that are under Pakistani control are known as Gilgit–Baltistan and Azad Kashmir (AJK). Its northernmost point is known as the NJ9842. This territorial division, which to this day still exists, severed many villages and separated family members from each other.

A separation fence construction between Indian and Pakistani controlled areas, based on 1972 cease-fire line, was initiated by India in 2003. In December 2013, it was revealed that India plans a construction of a separation wall in the Himalayan area in Kashmir. The wall is aimed to cover 179 km.

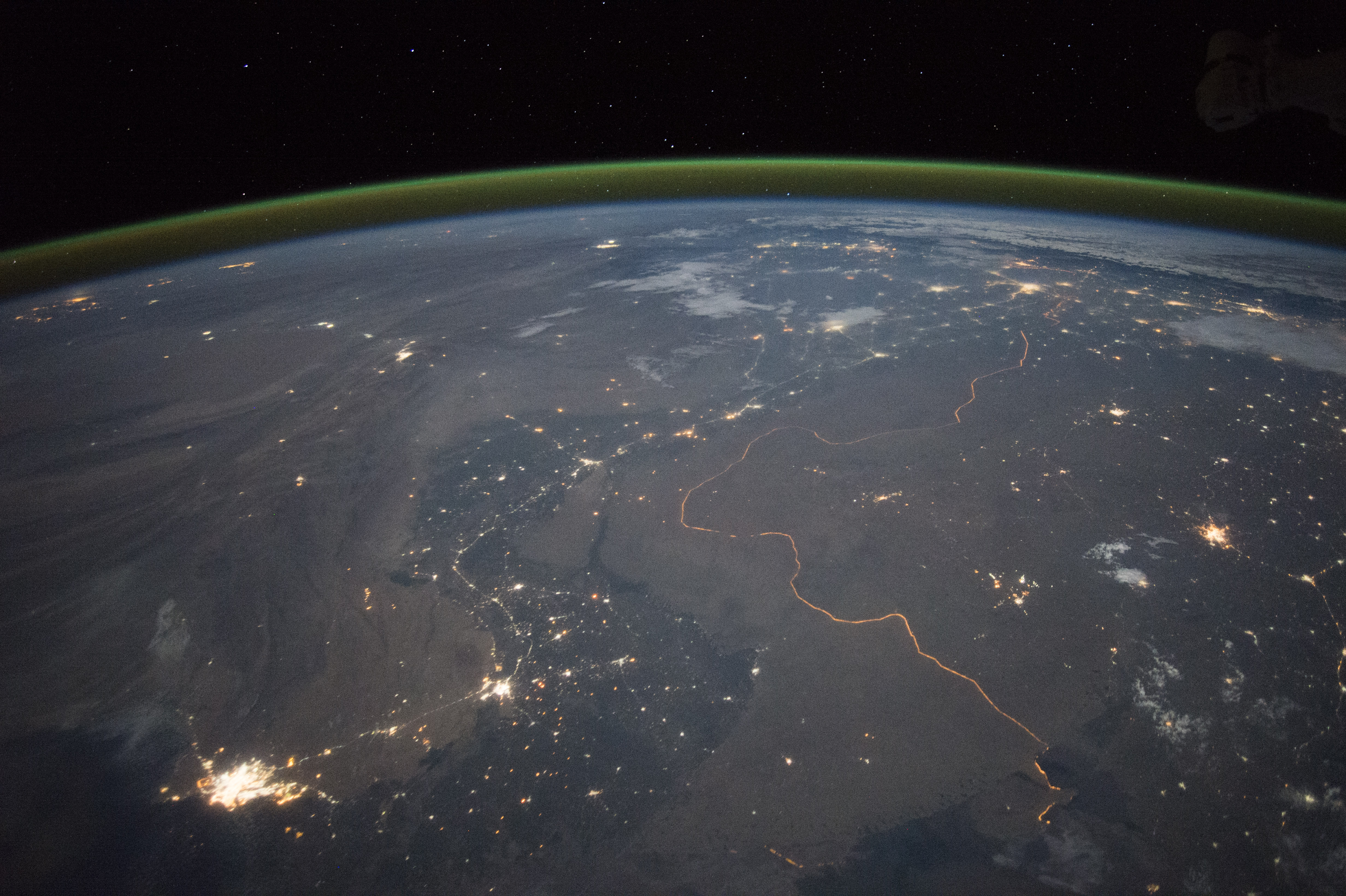
The India-Pakistan border seen at night

The other sections of India's borders also have a fence or wall.

=== Israel ===
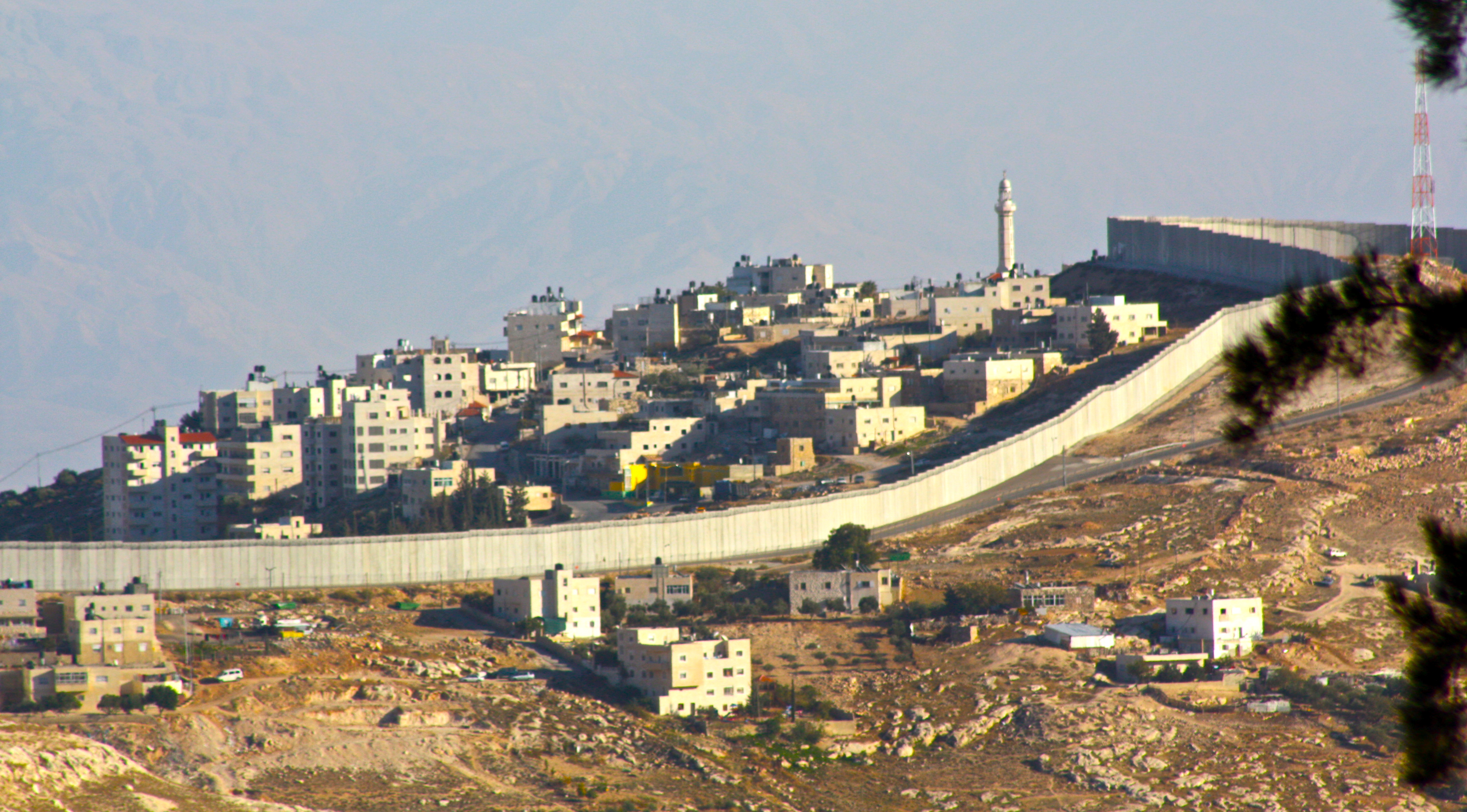
Israeli West Bank barrier between East Jerusalem and Abu Dis

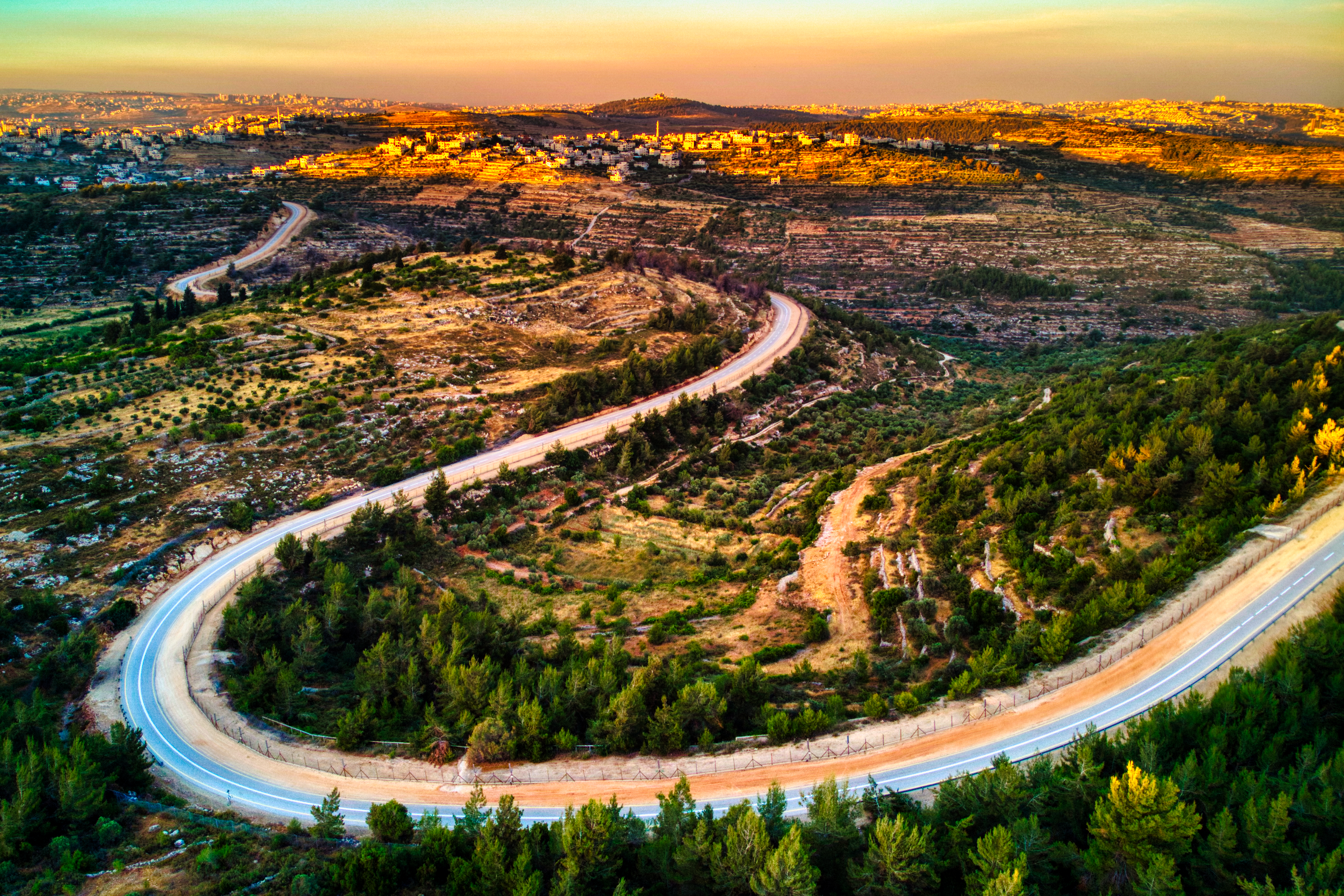
Israeli West Bank barrier and Beit Surik behind it

Israel began building the Israeli West Bank barrier in 2002, in order to protect civilians from Palestinian resistance such as suicide bombing attacks which increased significantly during the Second Intifada. Barrier opponents claim it seeks to annex Palestinian land under the guise of security and undermines peace negotiations by unilaterally establishing new borders. When completed it will be a 700-kilometres long network of high walls, electronic fences, gates and trenches. It is a controversial barrier, because much of it is built outside the 1949 Armistice Line (Green Line), de facto annexing potentially 10 percent of Palestinian land, according to the United Nations Office for the Coordination of Humanitarian Affairs. It cuts far into the West Bank and encompasses Israel's largest settlement blocs containing hundreds of thousands of settlers.

In June 2004, the Israeli Supreme Court held that building the wall on West Bank Palestinian land is in itself legal, but it ordered some changes to the original route, which separated 35,000 Palestinian farmers from their lands and crops. The Israeli finance minister (Benjamin Netanyahu) replied that it was disputed land, not Palestinian and its final status would be resolved in political negotiation. In July 2004, the International Court of Justice at The Hague in an advisory opinion declared that the barrier is illegal under international law and called on Israel to dismantle the walls, return confiscated land and make reparations for damages. Notwithstanding, the number of Arab terrorist suicide bombings continued to decrease with the gradual completion of segments of the Security Barrier, just as the Israeli authorities initially asserted that they would.

Israel refers to land between the 1949 lines and the separation barrier as the Seam Zone, including all of East Jerusalem. In 2003, the military declared that only Israeli citizens and Palestinians with permits are allowed to be inside it; Palestinians have found it increasingly difficult to get permits unless they own land in the zone. The separation barrier cuts off east Jerusalem and some settlement blocs from the West Bank, even as Israelis and Arabs build structures and communities in eastern Jerusalem. Palestinians in the West Bank, including East Jerusalem, have continued to protest the separation barrier.

The existing barrier cuts off access to the Jordan River for Palestinian farmers in the West Bank. Owing to international condemnation after the International Court ruling, Israel did not build a stronger barrier and instead instituted permit-based access control. It has been opined that this change was to allow land to be annexed. Israeli settlement councils already have de facto control of 86 percent of the Jordan Valley and the Dead Sea as the settler population steadily grows there.

=== Kuwait ===
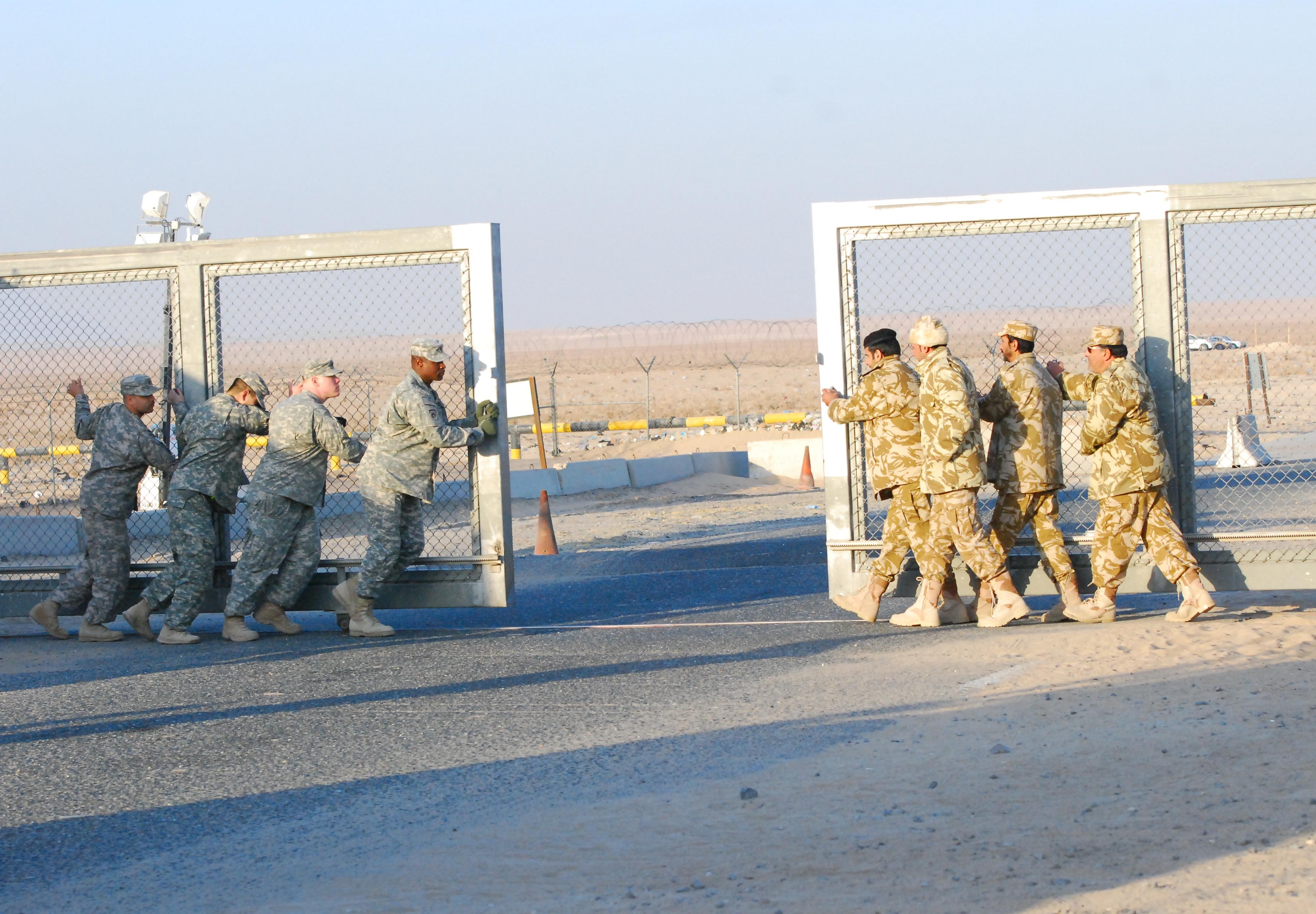
US and Kuwaiti soldiers closing the gate to Iraq of the border barrier in 2011

Writer Damon DiMarco has described as a "separation barrier" the Kuwait-Iraq barricade constructed by the United Nations in 1991 after the Iraqi invasion of Kuwait was repelled. With electrified fencing and concertina wire, it includes a 5-meter-wide trench and a high berm. It runs 180 kilometers along the border between the two nations.

=== Lebanon ===
A 2016 separation wall around the Ain al-Hilweh camp in Lebanon is intended to separate the local Palestinian-Lebanese population and Syrian refugee Palestinians from the surrounding society.

=== Malaysia ===
Renee Pirrong of The Heritage Foundation described the Malaysia–Thailand border barrier as a "separation barrier". Its purpose is to cut down on smuggling, drug trafficking, illegal immigration, crime and insurgency.

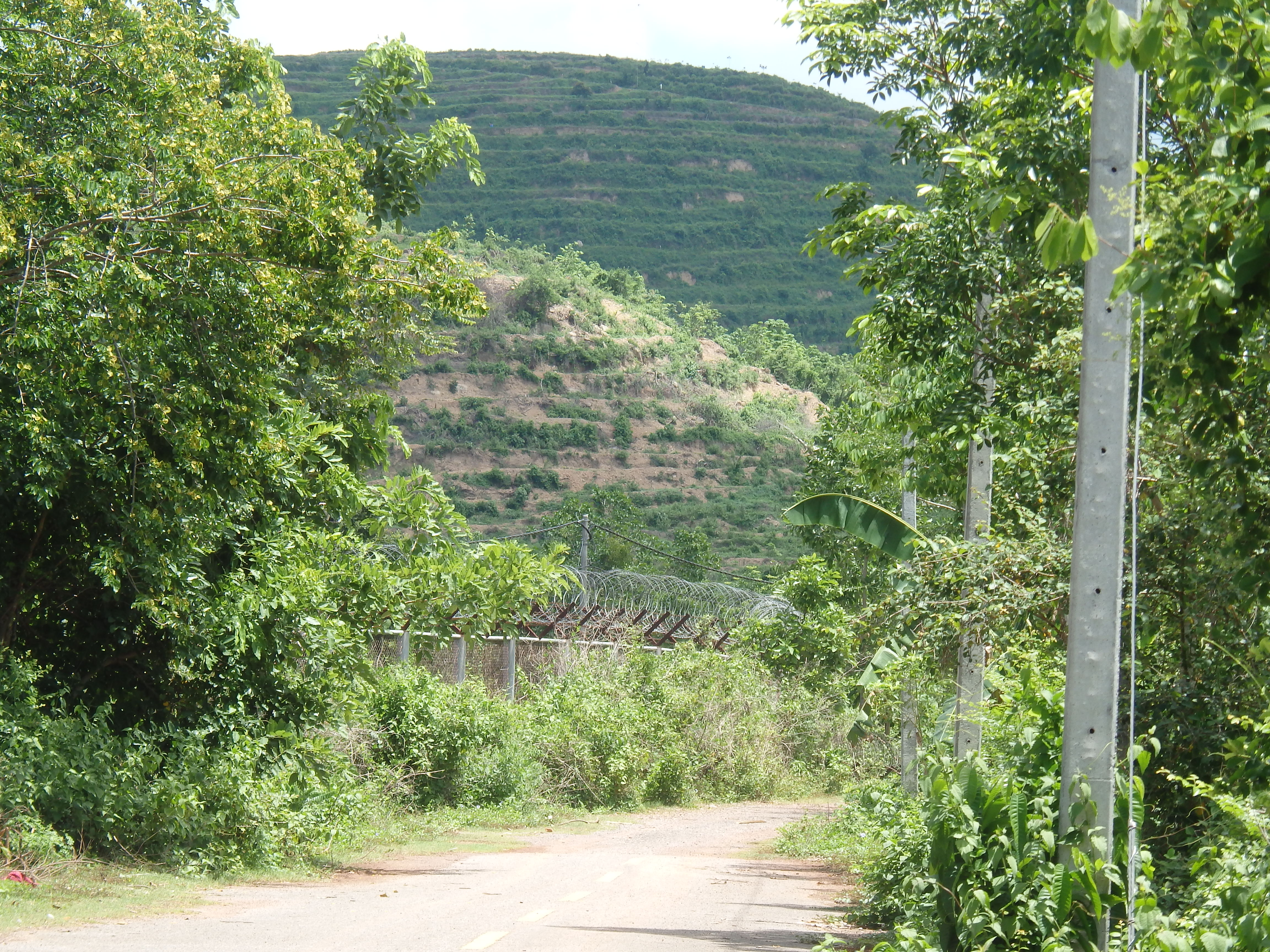
Wall between Malaysia and Thailand

=== Saudi Arabia ===
In 2004 Saudi Arabia began construction of a Saudi-Yemen barrier between its territory and Yemen to prevent the unauthorized movement of people and goods into and out of the Kingdom. Some have labeled it a "separation barrier". In February 2004 The Guardian reported that Yemeni opposition newspapers likened the barrier to the Israeli West Bank barrier, while The Independent wrote "Saudi Arabia, one of the most vocal critics in the Arab world of Israel's 'security fence' in the West Bank, is quietly emulating the Israeli example by erecting a barrier along its porous border with Yemen". Saudi officials rejected the comparison saying it was built to prevent infiltration and smuggling.

Saudi Arabia has also built a wall on the Saudi Iraqi border.

=== Turkey ===
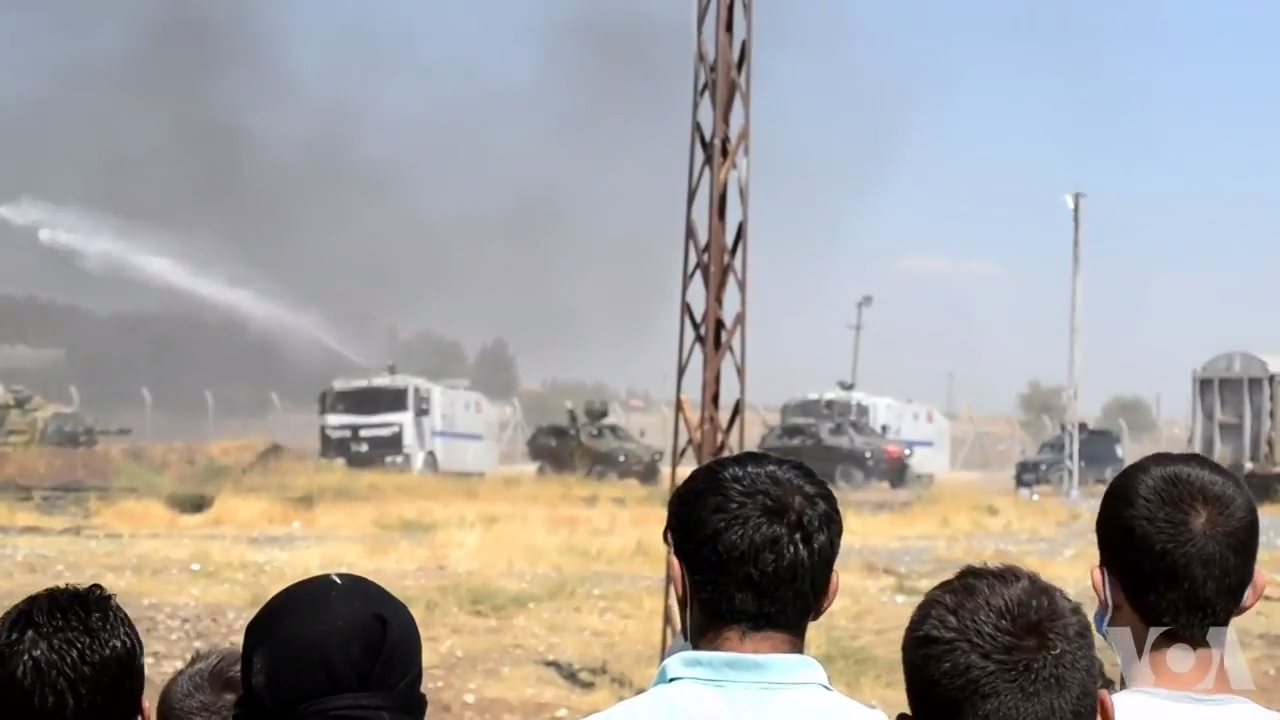
Turkish border guards manning armoured vehicles disperse protesters with a water cannon along the Turkey–Syria fence in Kobanî.

The Syria–Turkey barrier is a wall and fence under construction along the Syria–Turkey border aimed at preventing illegal crossings and smuggling from Syria into Turkey. In 2017, The Syrian government accused Turkey of building a separation wall, referring to the barrier.

From 2017, Turkey began construction a barrier along the Iran–Turkey border aimed at preventing illegal immigration and smuggling.

=== United Kingdom ===
Over 21 miles of high walling or fencing separate Catholic and Protestant communities in Northern Ireland, with most concentrated in Belfast and Derry. The wall was built in 1969 in order to separate the Catholic and Protestant areas in Belfast. An Army Major, overseeing the construction of the wall at the time, said: 'This is a temporary measure ... we do not want to see another Berlin wall situation in Western Europe ... it will be gone by Christmas'. In 2013, that wall still remains and almost 100 additional walls and barriers now complement the original. Technically known as 'peace walls', there are moves to remove all of them by 2023 by mutual consent.

=== United States ===
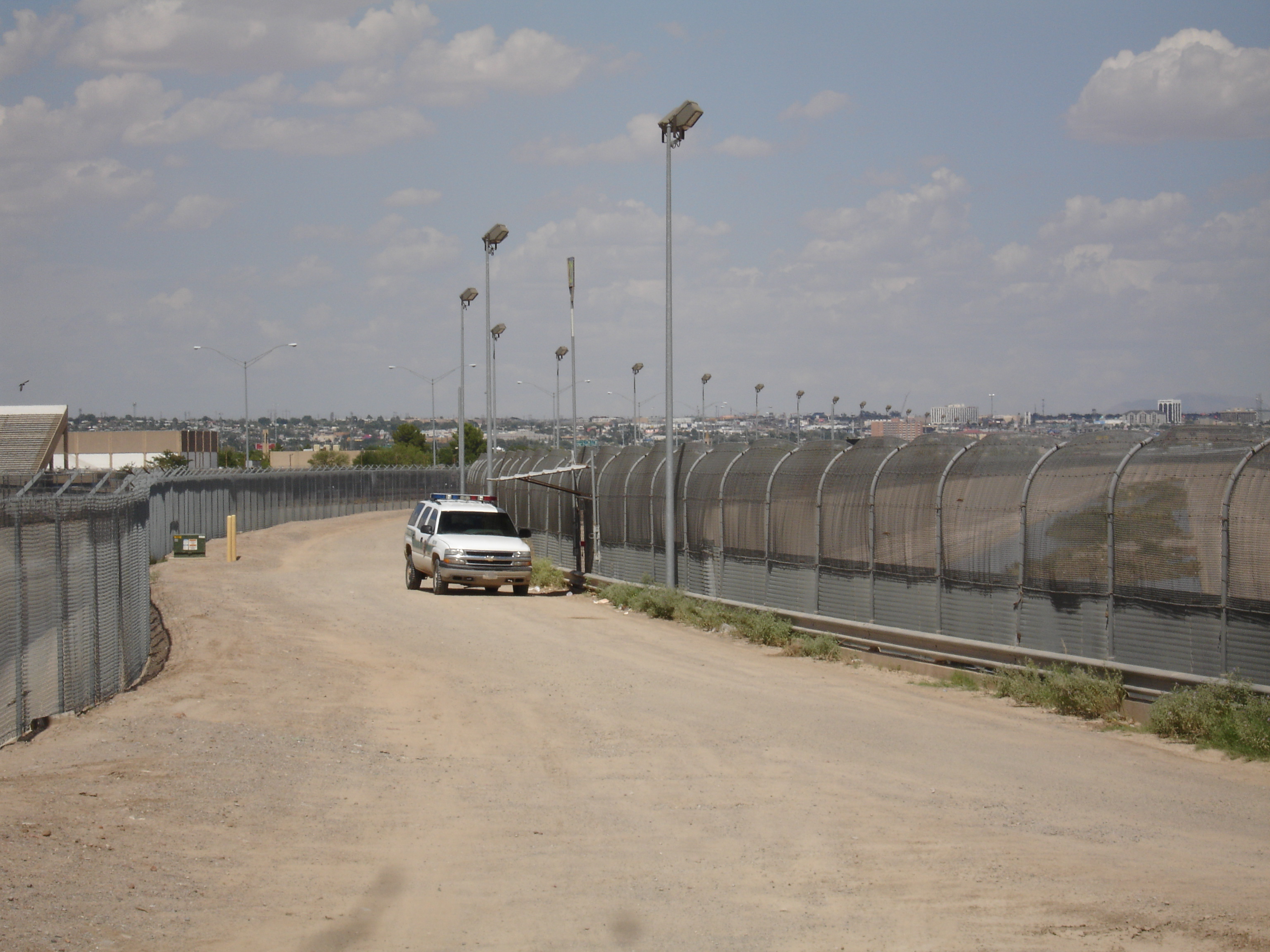
A barrier along the US-Mexico border. A US Border Patrol watches the barrier.

The United States constructed a barrier on the border with Mexico of 3,169 kilometres (1,969 mi) to prevent unauthorized immigration into the United States and to deter smuggling of contraband. The US President Trump stated that he would replace the wall with an updated Mexico–United States border wall; some parts of the old wall have been replaced.

The Detroit Wall was erected to enforce redlining as part of the policies of racial segregation in the United States.

=== Western Sahara ===
System of the Moroccan Walls in Western Sahara with chronology of their construction

Morocco has constructed a 2,700 km (1,700 mi) long sand wall cutting through the length of Western Sahara. Minefields and watchtowers serve to separate the Moroccan-controlled zone from the sparsely populated Free Zone.

== Past separation barriers ==
=== Germany ===
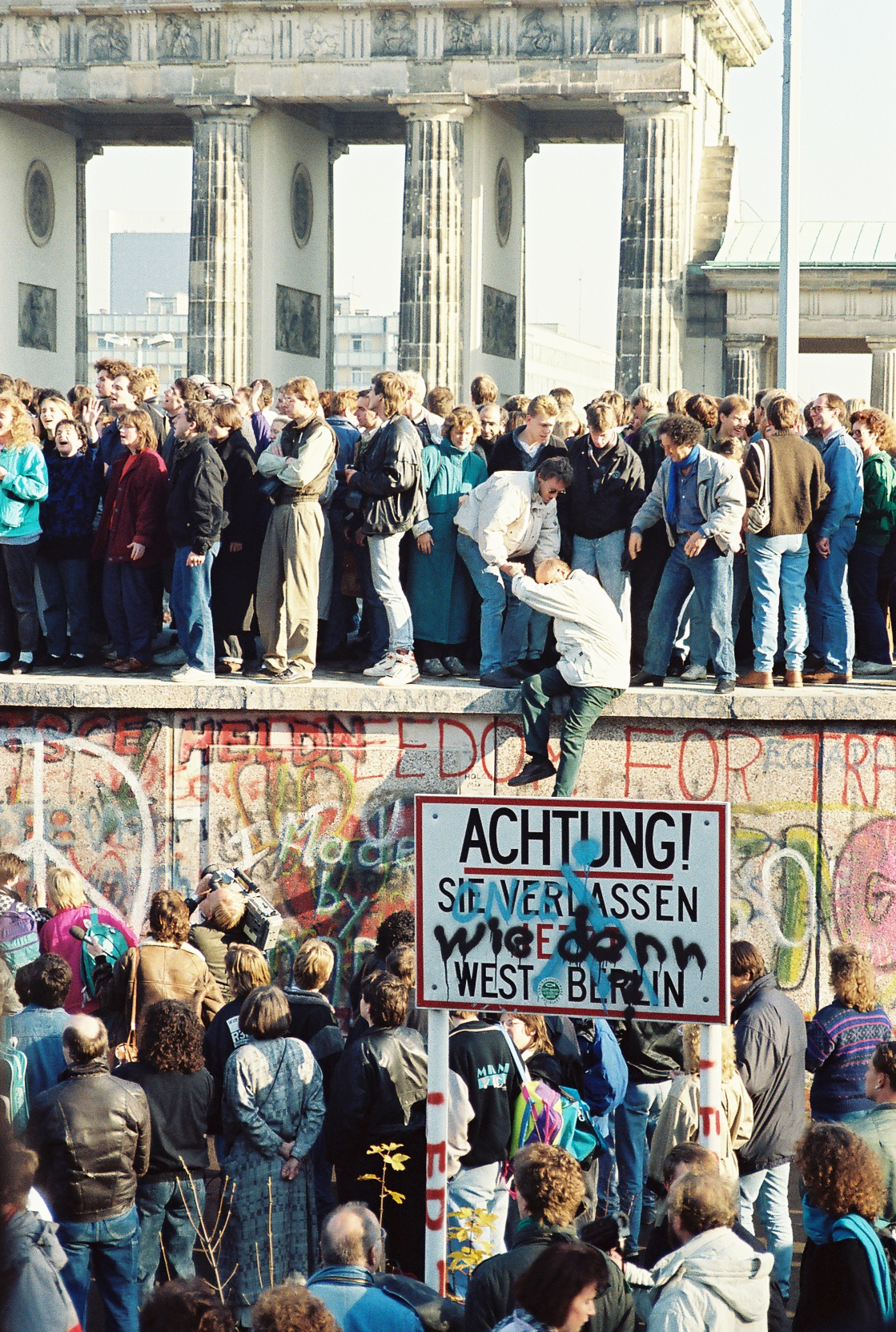
People climb onto the wall near Brandenburg Gate during the fall of the Berlin Wall, November 1989.

The Berlin Wall was a barrier that divided Berlin from 1961 to 1989, constructed by the German Democratic Republic (GDR, East Germany) starting on 13 August 1961, that completely cut off (by land) West Berlin from surrounding East Germany and from East Berlin until it was opened in November 1989. Its demolition officially began on 13 June 1990 and was completed in 1992. The barrier included guard towers placed along large concrete walls, which circumscribed a wide area (later known as the "death strip") that contained anti-vehicle trenches, "fakir beds" and other defenses. The Eastern Bloc claimed that the wall was erected to protect its population from fascist elements conspiring to prevent the "will of the people" in building a socialist state in East Germany. In practice, the Wall served to prevent the massive emigration and defection that marked East Germany and the communist Eastern Bloc during the post-World War II period.

The Berlin Wall was officially referred to as the "Anti-Fascist Protection Rampart" (German: Antifaschistischer Schutzwall) by GDR authorities, implying that the NATO countries and West Germany in particular were "fascists". The West Berlin city government sometimes referred to it as the "Wall of Shame"—a term coined by mayor Willy Brandt—while condemning the Wall's restriction on freedom of movement. Along with the separate and much longer Inner German border (IGB), which demarcated the border between East and West Germany, it came to symbolize the "Iron Curtain" that separated Western Europe and the Eastern Bloc during the Cold War.

Before the Wall's erection, 3.5 million East Germans circumvented Eastern Bloc emigration restrictions and defected from the GDR, many by crossing over the border from East Berlin into West Berlin, from where they could then travel to West Germany and other Western European countries. Between 1961 and 1989, the wall prevented almost all such emigration. During this period, around 5,000 people attempted to escape over the wall, with an estimated death toll of from 136 to more than 200 in and around Berlin.

In 1989, a series of radical political changes occurred in the Eastern Bloc, associated with the liberalization of the Eastern Bloc's authoritarian systems and the erosion of political power in the pro-Soviet governments in nearby Poland and Hungary. After several weeks of civil unrest, the East German government announced on 9 November 1989 that all GDR citizens could visit West Germany and West Berlin. Crowds of East Germans crossed and climbed onto the wall, joined by West Germans on the other side in a celebratory atmosphere. Over the next few weeks, euphoric people and souvenir hunters chipped away parts of the wall; the governments later used industrial equipment to remove most of what was left. Contrary to popular belief the wall's actual demolition did not begin until the summer of 1990 and was not completed until 1992. The fall of the Berlin Wall paved the way for German reunification, which was formally concluded on 3 October 1990.

== See also ==
- Border barrier
- Defensive walls
- List of fortifications
- List of walls
- List of cities with defensive walls
- Pest-exclusion fence
- Buffer zone
