= Urulyunguy =

Urulyunguy Урулюнгуй
- Selo
- Location within Zabaykalsky Krai Location within Russia
- Coordinates: 50°16′N 118°07′E
- Country: Russia
- Region: Zabaykalsky Krai
- District: Krasnokamensky District
- Time zone: UTC+9:00

Urulyunguy (Russian: Урулюнгуй) is a rural locality (a selo) in Krasnokamensky District, Zabaykalsky Krai, Russia. Population: 108 (2021 census); 135 (2010 census); There is 1 street in this selo.

== Geography ==
This rural locality is located 21 km from Krasnokamensk (the district's administrative centre), 383 km from Chita (capital of Zabaykalsky Krai) and 5,754 km from Moscow. Tselinny is the nearest rural locality.
