= Alice M. Greenwald =

American museum curator

- Education: Sarah Lawrence College; University of Chicago Divinity School
- Occupations: Museum curator and administrator
- Notable work: No Day Shall Erase You: The Story of 9/11 as Told at the September 11 Museum (2016)

Alice M. Greenwald is a museum curator and administrator, with expertise in history, ethnic heritage, and memorial museums. She was the president and chief executive officer of the National September 11 Memorial & Museum (a.k.a. 9/11 Memorial & Museum) from January 2017 through early October 2022. In 2021, she announced that she was leaving the post. Greenwald began her affiliation with the project in 2006, serving as the founding museum director and executive vice president for exhibitions, collections and education of the 9/11 Memorial & Museum from 2006 to 2016. Before joining the 9/11 Memorial & Museum, Greenwald was the associate museum director, museum programs, at the United States Holocaust Memorial Museum in Washington, D.C., from 2001 to 2006, having worked for the previous 14 years as an advisor to the project. She is the founder and principal of Memory Matters, LLC.

== Education ==
Greenwald has an M.A. degree in the History of Religions from the University of Chicago Divinity School, and a B.A. with concentrations in English Literature and Anthropology from Sarah Lawrence College. In 2007, she delivered the commencement address at Sarah Lawrence College, listed in Humanity.org’s Index of Outstanding Speeches as one of the two best speeches that year.

== Career ==
From 1984 to 1986, she served as chair of the Council of American Jewish Museums, and in 1981, received a Fellowship for Museum Professionals from the National Endowment for the Arts.

From 1986 to 2001, Greenwald was the principal of Alice M. Greenwald/Museum Services, working for clients including the United States Holocaust Memorial Museum, the Baltimore Museum of Industry, the Pew Charitable Trusts, and the Historical Society of Princeton. Greenwald has been executive director of the National Museum of American Jewish History, Philadelphia (1981–86); acting director (1980), curator (1978–81) and assistant curator (1975–78) of the Hebrew Union College Skirball Museum, Los Angeles, and curatorial assistant at the Spertus Museum of Judaica, Chicago.

Greenwald has advised a number of global memorial and museum projects, including the United Kingdom Holocaust Memorial & Learning Centre, a project under the auspices of the UK Holocaust Foundation Board, which she was invited to join at the request of former British prime minister David Cameron. She has also provided advice and consultation services to the planners of the Oslo Government Center/Utøya Island Memorials, commemorating the 22 July 2011 bombing/massacre in Norway.

Before joining the 9/11 Memorial & Museum, Greenwald was the associate museum director, museum programs, at the United States Holocaust Memorial Museum in Washington D.C. from 2001 to 2006, having worked for the previous 14 years as an expert advisor to the project and a member of the Design Team for the permanent exhibition.

From January 2017 to September 2022, Greenwald was the president and CEO of the National September 11 Memorial & Museum.

== Awards and recognition ==
- 1973: Greenwald was awarded a Danforth Graduate Fellowship.
- 2007: she delivered the commencement address at Sarah Lawrence College.
- 2016: Bronze Prize in the 2016 Foreword INDIES Award, in the category of History (Adult Non-Fiction), for her book No Day Shall Erase You: The Story of 9/11 as Told at the September 11 Memorial Museum
- 2019: She was inducted into the Manhattan Jewish Hall of Fame in 2019.
- 2023: Legacy Award from the VOICES Center for Resilience.

== Books ==
- Old Traditions, New Beginnings, Two Hundred Fifty Years of Princeton Jewish History, Princeton, NJ: Historical Society of Princeton (2002)
- The Stories They Tell: Artifacts from the National September 11 Memorial Museum, New York: Skira/Rizzoli (2013)
- No Day Shall Erase You: The Story of 9/11 as Told at the September 11 Museum (2016)

== Selected articles ==
1. Reflections, Chapters 2 and 6, in 20+ Years of Urban Rebuilding: Lessons from the Revival of Lower Manhattan after 9/11 by Patrice Derrington and Rosemary Scanlon, Routledge, 2024
2. Foreword, Shoring Up Ourselves: An Inspirational Story of Never Giving Up by Robert Gray, Gatekeeper Press, 2024
3. "A Time of Transformation", Point-of-View Feature, Museum magazine, American Alliance of Museums, May/June 2023 issue, pp. 14–16
4. Interview transcript, Tower Stories: An Oral History of 9/11 by Damon DiMarco, Santa Monica Press, 2021, pp. 473–487
5. Foreword, 9/11 and the Academy: Responses in the Liberal Arts and the 21st Century World, Cham: Switzerland: Palgrave Macmillan, 2019
6. Contributing writer, "The Heart of Memory: Voices from the 9/11 Memorial Museum Formation Experience", Museum magazine, May/June 2014, pp. 28–29
7. Contributing writer, Mémoire et Mémorialisation, Volume 1: de l'absence à la representation, Hermann, 2013
8. "'Passion on All Sides': Lessons for Planning the National September 11 Memorial Museum", in CURATOR: The Museum Journal, Volume 53, Number 1, January 2010, pp. 117–125
9. Introduction, On Eagles' Wings: A Decade of Collecting, Philadelphia: National Museum of American Jewish History (NMAJH), June 1986, pp. 5–12
10. "Ethnographic Approaches within the Museum Setting", Jewish Folklore and Ethnology Newsletter, Vol. 7, No. 1–4, 1985, pp. 1–4
11. "The Masonic Mizrach and Lamp: Jewish Ritual Art as a Reflection of Cultural Assimilation", Journal of Jewish Art, Jerusalem: Center for Jewish Art of The Hebrew University, Volume Ten, 1984, pp. 87–101
12. "The Mizrach: Compass of the Heart", Hadassah Magazine, October 1979, pp. 12–13
13. “The Relic on the Spear: Historiography and the Saga of Dutthagamani,” in Bardwell L. Smith, editor, Religion and the Legitimation of Power in Sri Lanka, Chambersburg, PA: Anima Books, 1977, pp. 13–35; 2nd edition, 1980
