= The Shame (performance art) =

Performance art by Abel Azcona

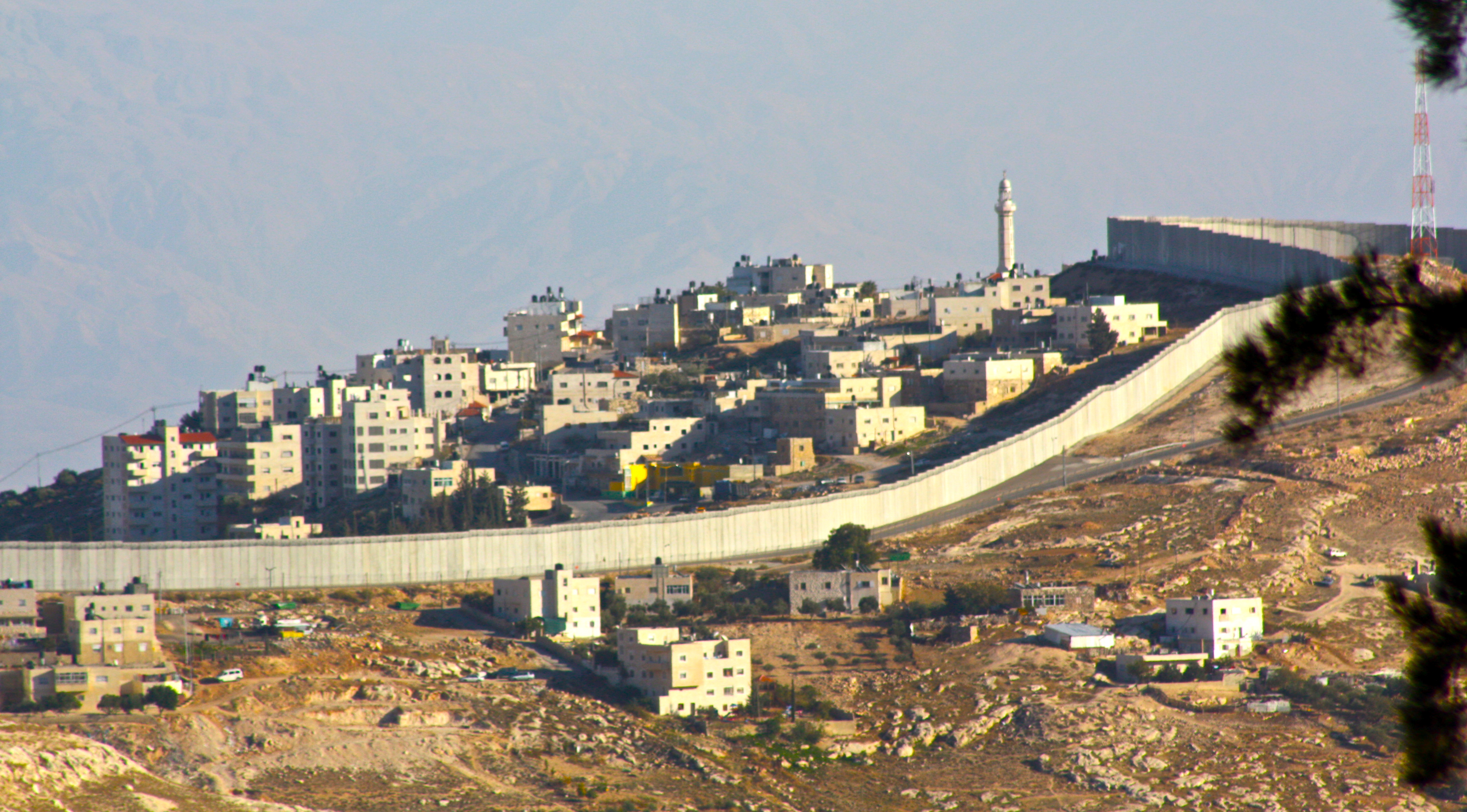
- Artist: Abel Azcona
- Year: 2018
- Type: Performance art
- Location: West Bank Wall; Palestine, Israel

The Shame (Spanish: La vergüenza) is a conceptual, critical and process artwork by Abel Azcona. Developed along the West Bank Wall in 2018, in The Shame Azcona installed original fragments of the Berlin Wall along the Israeli wall in the West Bank, which forms part of the barrier built throughout Israel to separate the Palestinian lands. Azcona made a metaphorical critique by merging both walls in the work. The actual installation, as if it were a piece of land art, currently remains along the wall, and has been exhibited in different countries through photographic and video art. The Israeli government has prohibited the artist from entering Israel because of the piece.

== Bibliography ==
- López Landabaso, Patricia (2017). La performance como medio de expresión artística. Expresiones actuales en el País Vasco (PDF) (in Spanish). Universidad del País Vasco.
- Cano Martínez, Maria Jesús (2018). Escondido tras la piel: representaciones y afrontamientos del dolor y el sufrimiento desde el arte de acción (in Spanish). Universidad de Granada. ISBN 9788491639541.
- Molina Ruiz, Irene (2016). El autorretrato como canalizador del dolor (in Spanish). University of Granada. ISBN 9788491258148.
- Group FIDEX, Figures of excess and body policies (2018). Technical-conceptual atlas of the Fidex research group: Micropolitics in contemporary research in Fine Arts (in Spanish). Universitas Miguel Hernández. ISBN 978-8416024711.

== See also ==
- Wall of Shame
- List of Berlin Wall segments
- Performance Art
- Installation
- Endurance art
- Israeli–Palestinian conflict
