= Wall of Shame =

Term used to refer to the Berlin Wall

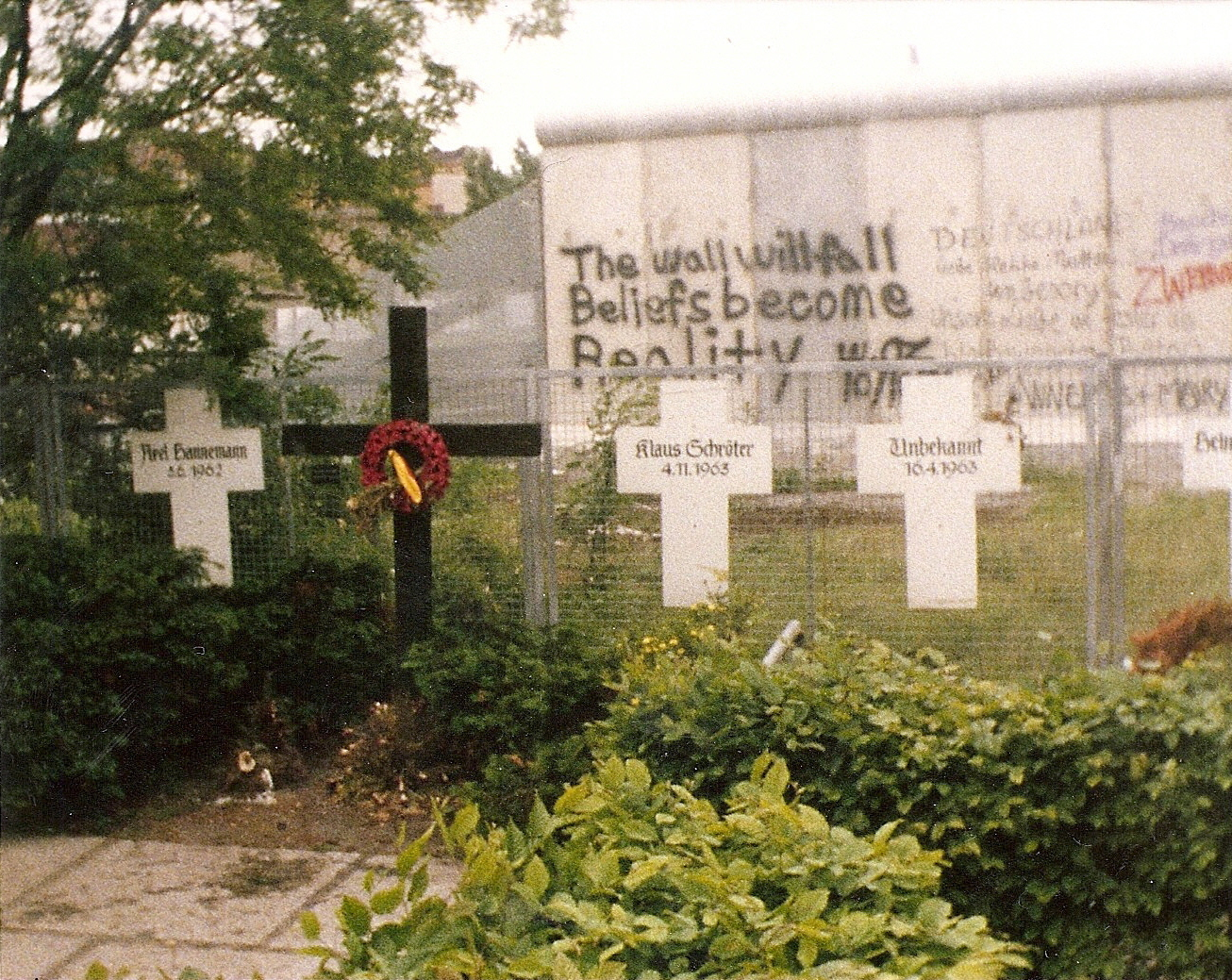
The Berlin Wall seen from the western side in the 1980s, with memorials to known and unknown victims

"Wall of Shame" (German: Schandmauer) is a phrase that is most commonly associated with the Berlin Wall. In this context, the phrase was coined by Willy Brandt, and it was used by the government of West Berlin, and later popularized in the English-speaking world and elsewhere from the beginning of the 1960s. Inspired by its usage in reference to the Berlin Wall, the term has later been used more widely.

More recently, the term "Wall of Shame" has been used in reference to the Mexico–United States border, the Egypt–Gaza border, the Israeli West Bank barrier, the Moroccan Western Sahara wall, and the barriers of the same name in Peru.

== Applied to Japanese culture ==
The earliest use of the term, which is a translation of a Japanese phrase, may have been by Ruth Benedict, in her influential book, The Chrysanthemum and the Sword (1948), and other anthropologists discussing the honor shame culture of Japan.

== Applied to the Berlin Wall ==
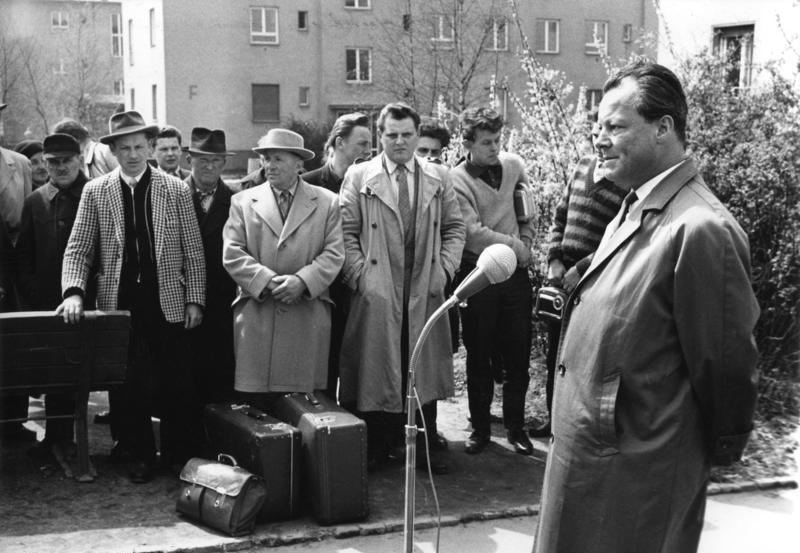
Willy Brandt coined the term Wall of Shame in reference to the Berlin Wall.

The term was used by the government of West Berlin to refer to the Berlin Wall, which surrounded West Berlin and separated it from East Berlin and the GDR. In 1961, the government of East Germany named the erected wall as the "Anti-Fascist Protection Rampart", a part of the inner German border; many Berliners, however, called it "Schandmauer" ("Wall of Shame").

The term was coined by governing mayor Willy Brandt. Outside Germany it first appeared as "Wall of Shame" in a cover story published by TIME in 1962, and President of the United States John F. Kennedy used the term in his Annual Message to the US Congress on the State of the Union, 14 January 1963. Often, graffiti would be painted on points, where a street would intersect with the wall, often reading, "Road blocked by Wall of Shame".

The Berlin Wall was referred to as the "Wall of Shame" in many more recent notable contexts, such as:

- The academic article, "The Democratic Invention", by Mário Soares, former Prime Minister and later President of Portugal (1986–1996)
- The "Our Europe" speech by Jacques Chirac, President of France, to the Bundestag, 27 June 2000
- A speech in 2002 by Romano Prodi, Prime Minister of Italy and former President of the European Commission

== Other uses ==
- In 1998, UNIFEM organized a photo exhibit at the United Nations that contrasted a "wall of shame", focusing on women's plight and suffering, with a "wall of hope", showcasing initiatives to end violence against women.
- An academic paper by M. Lachance (York University) talks about the Quebec "wall of shame".
- The Lima Wall of Shame a ten-foot (3.0 m) high wall, separating squatter areas in San Juan de Miraflores and Surco.
- The 2016 separation wall around the Ain al-Hilweh camp in Lebanon, intended to separate the local Palestinian-Lebanese population from the surrounding society.
- The Egypt–Gaza barrier
- The Israeli West Bank barrier
- The Mexico–United States barrier
- Some restaurants, such as Munchies 420 Café in Sarasota, Florida have a "wall of fame" and a "wall of shame" where if someone takes a challenge they go on the wall of fame if they succeed or the wall of shame if they fail.

== See also ==
- The Shame
