= Tang Baiqiao =

Chinese political dissident at Tiananment square

- 唐柏桥
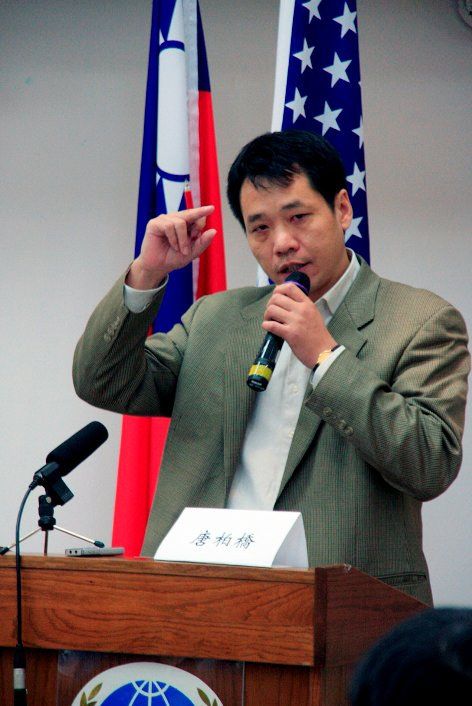
- Tang Baiqiao at the Overseas Community Affairs Council
- Born: August 11, 1967 (age 59); Yongzhou, Hunan, China
- Education: Hunan Normal University; Columbia University
- Years active: 1986–present

Baiqiao Tang (Chinese: 唐柏桥; born August 11, 1967), sometimes spelled Tang Boqiao, is a Chinese political dissident from Hunan province who led student protests during the 1989 democracy movement. After the 1989 Tiananmen Square protests and massacre, Tang fled from agents of the Chinese Communist Party (CCP) who eventually arrested him in the city of Jiangmen. He was charged with being a counter-revolutionary and imprisoned.

Upon his release, Tang fled to Hong Kong, where he co-authored the report Anthems of Defeat: Crackdown in Hunan Province 1989–1992 through Human Rights Watch with Robin Munro of the University of London. Tang was later accepted into the United States as a political refugee in 1992. He graduated in 2003 with a master's degree in international affairs from Columbia University.

== Early life and education ==
Tang was born on August 11, 1967, in Yongzhou. He attended Lingling Number Four High School in Hunan, and then Hunan Normal University.

== Arrival in the United States ==
Tang arrived in the United States in April 1992. In June 1992, at a press conference in Washington, D.C., he announced the existence of an underground group called the All-China People's Autonomous Federation. According to Tang, it was at that time operating in the People's Republic of China, and consisted mostly of former students who had taken part in the Tiananmen Square protests of 1989. Tang called himself the group's "overseas spokesman". He refused to cite specific members of the group for fear of reprisal by the CCP. The federation's existence was corroborated by Robin Munro, who reportedly called the group "extensive and well organized".

Tang was also cited by officials of Asia Watch, a division of Human Rights Watch, for contributing the majority of research to a publication called Anthems of Defeat: Crackdown in Hunan Province 1989–1992. The book details some of the harshest punishments and human rights atrocities meted out by the CCP in the wake of Tiananmen Square. Among these were the plight of three Chinese dissidents sentenced up to life imprisonment for hurling paint at an image of Mao Zedong in connection with student protests during the 1989 democracy movement.

== Continued activism ==
Since his escape from China, Tang has remained very active in the pro-democracy movement. In particular, he has called for a reassessment of China's human rights policies (including the number of actual casualties sustained in the Tiananmen Square massacre), an examination of the persecution of Falun Gong practitioners worldwide, support for the Dalai Lama's efforts to negotiate change for Tibet, and an end to the CCP. His articles have appeared in the Journal of International Affairs and Beijing Spring, among other publications. Tang is a frequent on-air special commentator for New Tang Dynasty Television. He is a spokesman and officer for the China Interim Government. Tang is a noted supporter of Donald Trump. He criticized Trump as a flawed politician, but praised his actions against the CCP. In 2017, he became one of the operators of a Twitter account that translated to Simplified Chinese all of Trump's tweets. The account amassed over 50,000 followers.

== Retrospective commentary on Tiananmen Square ==
In 1999, in an interview with Human Rights Watch, Tang stated, "The 1989 democracy movement and the June 4 crackdown cut off any meaningful movement toward political change." Specifically, he said that public discussion related to political reforms were taking place before the Tiananmen Square protests. Tang noted that the reform efforts of Zhao Ziyang, Bao Tong, and Chen Yizi might well have prevailed had the crackdown never occurred. According to Tang, Tiananmen Square ultimately allowed CCP leaders such as Jiang Zemin to consolidate their power over the party, the government, and the military. In the same interview, Tang observed that corruption, not political reform, was the primary concern of student protesters. He also commented that students wished to see Hu Yaobang rehabilitated, as well as increased social benefits for intellectuals. Tang maintained that issues of democracy and human rights only emerged in the end stages of Tiananmen Square, and then somewhat tangentially. In 2004, Tang stated that the Chinese government has allowed greater economic, social, and cultural freedoms due to the 1989 movement.

== Publications ==
Along with Robin Munro, Tang is the author of Anthems of Defeat: Crackdown in Hunan Province 1989–1992. He also wrote the foreword to Peter Navarro's 2011 book Death by China, which highlights the threats to America's economic dominance in the 21st century posed by China and the CCP. With Damon DiMarco, Tang also wrote My Two Chinas: The Memoir of a Chinese Counterrevolutionary, which was published by Prometheus Books in 2011. He is the author of various articles.

== See also ==
- List of Chinese dissidents
