= Global Alliance on Health and Pollution =

International network of agencies

GAHP (Global Alliance on Health and Pollution) is a network of international and national level agencies committed to a collaborative, multi-sectoral approach to address the global pollution crisis and the resulting health and economic impacts. GAHP's overall goal is to reduce death and illness caused by all forms of toxic pollution, including air, water, soil and chemical wastes especially in low and middle-income countries.

== History ==
GAHP is a collaborative body made up of more than 60 members and dozens of observers that advocates for resources and solutions to pollution problems. GAHP was formed because international and national level actors/ agencies recognize that a collaborative, multi-stakeholder, multi-sectoral approach is necessary and critical to deal with the global pollution crisis and resulting health and economic impacts.

In 2012, Pure Earth initiated the alliance with representatives from the World Bank, UNEP, UNDP, UNIDO, Asian Development Bank, the European Commission, and Ministries of Environment and Health of many low and middle-income countries to formulate strategies to address pollution and health at scale. GAHP incorporated as a foundation in 2019 in Geneva, Switzerland.

GAHP focuses its efforts in two main areas: advocacy and awareness raising and country-specific support. GAHP builds public, technical and financial support to address pollution globally by promoting scientific research, raising awareness and tracking progress. GAHP assists low- and middle-income countries to prioritize and address pollution and problems through Health and Pollution Action Plans.

In October 2017, GAHP published the Lancet Commission on Pollution and Health in collaboration with The Lancet. The commission "addresses the full health and economic costs of air, water, and soil pollution. Through analyses of existing and emerging data, the Commission reveals pollution's severe and underreported contribution to the Global Burden of Disease. It uncovers the economic costs of pollution to low-income and middle-income countries. The Commission will inform key decision makers around the world about the burden that pollution places on health and economic development, and about available cost-effective pollution control solutions and strategies."

The report's findings were distributed widely through media outlets, reaching over 2 billion people and counting. The work of the Commission was also covered extensively through special partnerships with high-profile media organizations.

In addition, GAHP updates findings from The Lancet Commission on Pollution and Health, and provides a ranking of pollution deaths on a global, regional and country level with Pollution and Health Metrics: Global, Regional and Country Analysis reports.

Pollution remains the world's largest environmental threat to human health, responsible in 2017 for 15% of all deaths globally, and 275 million Disability-Adjusted Life Years. The 2019 report, which uses the most recent Global Burden of Disease data from the Institute of Health Metrics Evaluation, underscores the extent and severity of harm caused by air, water, and occupational pollution.

== GAHP members include ==
- Pure Earth (formerly known as Blacksmith Institute) (GAHP Secretariat)
- Cyrus R. Vance Center for International Justice
- Deutsche Gesellschaft für Internationale Zusammenarbeit (GIZ) GmbH
- European Commission
- Fundación Chile
- Intendencia de Montevideo, Government of Uruguay
- Inter American Development Bank (BID)
- Komite Penghapusan Bensin Bertimbel (KPBB – Indonesian NGO)
- La Agencia de Protección Ambiental de la Ciudad de Buenos Aires, Government of Argentina
- Ministry of Health, Government of the Republic of Tajikistan
- Ministry of Environment, Government of Indonesia
- Ministry of Environment, Government of Madagascar
- Ministry of Environment, Government of Mexico (SEMARNAT)
- Ministry of Environment, Government of Perú (MINAM)
- Department of Environment and Natural Resources, Government of the Philippines (DENR)
- Ministry of Environment, Government of Senegal
- Ministry of Environment, Government of Uruguay, DINAMA
- United Nations Development Programme (UNDP)
- United Nations Environment Program (UNEP)
- United Nations Industrial Development Organization (UNIDO)
- World Bank (WB)
