= Krasnokamensk Airport =

- IATA: none; ICAO: UIAE

Summary
- Airport type: Public
- Location: Krasnokamensk
- Elevation AMSL: 2,139 ft / 652 m
- Coordinates: 50°2′0″N 118°4′0″E
- Interactive map of Krasnokamensk Airport

Runways
Direction	Length		Surface
Direction	ft	m	Surface
17/35	7,710	2,350	Concrete

Krasnokamensk Airport (Russian: Аэропорт Краснокаменск) (ICAO: UIAE) is an airport in Zabaykalsky Krai, Russia located 7 km south of Krasnokamensk. Services prop transports. It contains a single utilitarian tarmac but is well-maintained, with first-rate construction, and can easily service jets.

== See also ==
- List of airports in Russia
