= Krasnokamensk, Krasnoyarsk Krai =

Krasnokamensk Краснокаменск
- Urban-type settlement
- Interactive map of Krasnokamensk
- Location of Krasnokamensk Krasnokamensk (Krasnoyarsk Krai)
- Coordinates: 54.3378°N 93.2569°E
- Country: Russia
- Federal subject: Krasnoyarsk Krai
- Administrative district: Kuraginsky District
- Founded: 1961

Population (2010 Census)
  - Total: 4,667
  - Estimate (2025): 3,118 (−33.2%)
- Time zone: UTC+7 (MSK+4)
- Postal code: 662955
- OKTMO ID: 04630154051

Krasnokamensk (Russian: Краснока́менск) is an urban locality (an urban-type settlement) in Kuraginsky District of Krasnoyarsk Krai, Russia. Population: 4,667 (2010 census); 4,848 (2002 census); 5,325 (1989 Soviet census).
