= Pure Earth =

Nonprofit organization

- Formation: 1999
- Type: International NGO
- Location: New York City, New York
- President: Drew McCartor
- Founder: Richard Fuller
- Website: www.pureearth.org

Pure Earth (originally Blacksmith Institute) is a New York City–based international nonprofit founded in 1999 that works to identify and address pollution-related issues in low- and middle-income countries. Pure Earth's work focuses on two key pollutants: lead and mercury.

The Global Lead Program works on reducing lead poisoning from three key sources poisoning millions of children in low- and middle-income countries: the unsafe and informal recycling of used lead-acid batteries, lead-glazed pottery, and contaminated spices.

The Global Mercury Program works to reduce mercury from artisanal and small scale gold mining communities around the world by training miners to go mercury-free, and helping miners in the Amazon rainforest restore land damaged by mining.

Pure Earth is known for the Toxic Sites Identification Program, a global movement to find and clean up some of the world's most toxic sites. The program has trained over 500 pollution investigators and 90 government representatives worldwide, who have identified and mapped over 5000 toxic hotspots in communities around the world. The data they collect has built an "unprecedented public database of toxic sites" that helps local communities and governments plan clean up to protect residents.

Pure Earth is also known for initiating the Global Alliance on Health and Pollution, which in turn led to the formation of The Lancet Commission on pollution and health and the publication of a report from the Lancet Commission on health and pollution concluding in 2017 that pollution is the largest environmental cause of death in the world, killing three times more people than AIDS/HIV, tuberculosis and malaria combined, and 15 times more than war and other forms of violence.

In 2015, Pure Earth advocated for broadening the scope of toxic pollution addressed in the United Nations' Sustainable Development Goals. In 2020, Pure Earth and UNICEF issued an urgent call to protect 800 million children poisoned by lead, following the publication of their joint report: The Toxic Truth: Children’s exposure to lead pollution undermines a generation of potential. The report revealed that lead poisoning is affecting children on a massive and previously unknown scale – one in three children globally have elevated blood lead levels, and nearly half of them live in South Asia.

Pure Earth has been recognized by the charity evaluators Charity Navigator and Happier Lives Institute as one of the United States' top performing nonprofits and likely one of the most cost-effective charities working in reducing lead pollution.

Pure Earth was formerly known as the Blacksmith Institute, which was recognized for a series of World's Worst Pollution Problems reports that first brought attention to the global pollution problem.

== Toxic Sites Identification Program ==
Pure Earth's Toxic Site Identification Program (TSIP) works to identify and screen contaminated sites in low- and middle-income countries where public health is at risk. Pure Earth has trained more than 400 toxic sites investigators around the world to find, map and assess polluted sites that pose health risks in their communities. To date, TSIP investigators have identified more than 3,100 sites in over 50 countries. These sites alone represent a potential health risk to more than 80 million poor people.

The data collected by TSIP investigators is entered into Pure Earth's database of polluted sites, the largest database of its kind. This information is made accessible to governments so that they can formulate plans to prioritize action on pollution that poses the most risk to populations.

== Global Alliance on Health and Pollution ==
In July 2012, Pure Earth convened a third meeting of world leaders and experts on pollution at the Rockefeller Foundation's Bellagio Center in Italy. The Global Alliance on Health and Pollution (GAPH) was formed that year by Pure Earth, the World Bank, UNEP, UNDP, UNIDO, Asian Development Bank, the European Commission, Ministries of Environment and Health of many low- and middle-income countries to address pollution and health at scale. Blacksmith serves as Secretariat for the GAHP. Blacksmith began coordinating an international effort to create a global alliance in 2008. The effort was formerly called the Health and Pollution Fund.

== Journal of Health and Pollution ==
Published by Pure Earth, the Journal of Health and Pollution (JH&P) is a quarterly on-line journal of peer-reviewed research and news. JH&P is grant funded by the World Bank and the European Union. There are no charges to readers or authors. JH&P aims to facilitate discussion of toxic pollution, impacts to human health and strategies for site remediation. The journal focuses on work by researchers from or about under-represented low- and middle-income countries.

=== Other highlights ===
In 2021, Pure Earth launched a project to analyze the lead (Pb) content in thousands of products and food samples in markets across 25 low- and middle-income countries. The Rapid Market Screening (RMS) project is the first analysis of its kind that we are aware of. The RMS project follows the 2020 publication of The Toxic Truth report by Pure Earth and UNICEF, which revealed for the first time that an estimated 800 million children, or 1 in 3, have blood lead levels indicative of lead poisoning (>5 μg/dl).

In October 2022, Pure Earth's Founder and President Richard Fuller was included in the #FuturePerfect50 list from Vox, recognizing "The scientists, thinkers, scholars, writers, and activists building a more perfect future."

In 2010, Pure Earth's impact was charted in a profile of its founder Richard Fuller in Time's "Power of One" column.

2015 saw the release of the book The Brown Agenda.

In 2019, Pure Earth released the report "Pollution Knows No Borders: How the Pollution Crisis in Low- and Middle-Income Countries Affects Everyone’s Health, and What We Can Do to Address It".

== Name change ==
Pure Earth was founded as the Blacksmith Institute in 1999.

In 2014, Blacksmith launched a new initiative – Blacksmith Institute for a Pure Earth – with English actor Dev Patel as celebrity ambassador. Patel worked closely with Blacksmith to suggest the new name, and will help support efforts to raise awareness about toxic pollution, an issue he says he first grew aware of after filming in India. Blacksmith will slowly transition to a new name – Pure Earth – with the aim of broadening awareness of global toxic pollution issues to the general public.

== World's Worst Polluted Places reports ==
For over a decade, Pure Earth's World's Worst Pollution Problems reports identified and drew attention to the worst, and most dangerously polluted places on the planet, while documenting and quantifying the startling health and environmental impacts of this neglected problem. The series of reports succeeded in raising global awareness about the extent and impacts of toxic pollution in low- and middle-income countries. For example, the 2015 highlights its "top six toxic threats": Lead, radionuclides, mercury, chromium, pesticides and cadmium. The reports were archived on the website worstpolluted.org.
