= Krasnokamensk, Zabaykalsky Krai =

Town in Zabaykalsky Krai, Russia

Krasnokamensk Краснокаменск
- Town
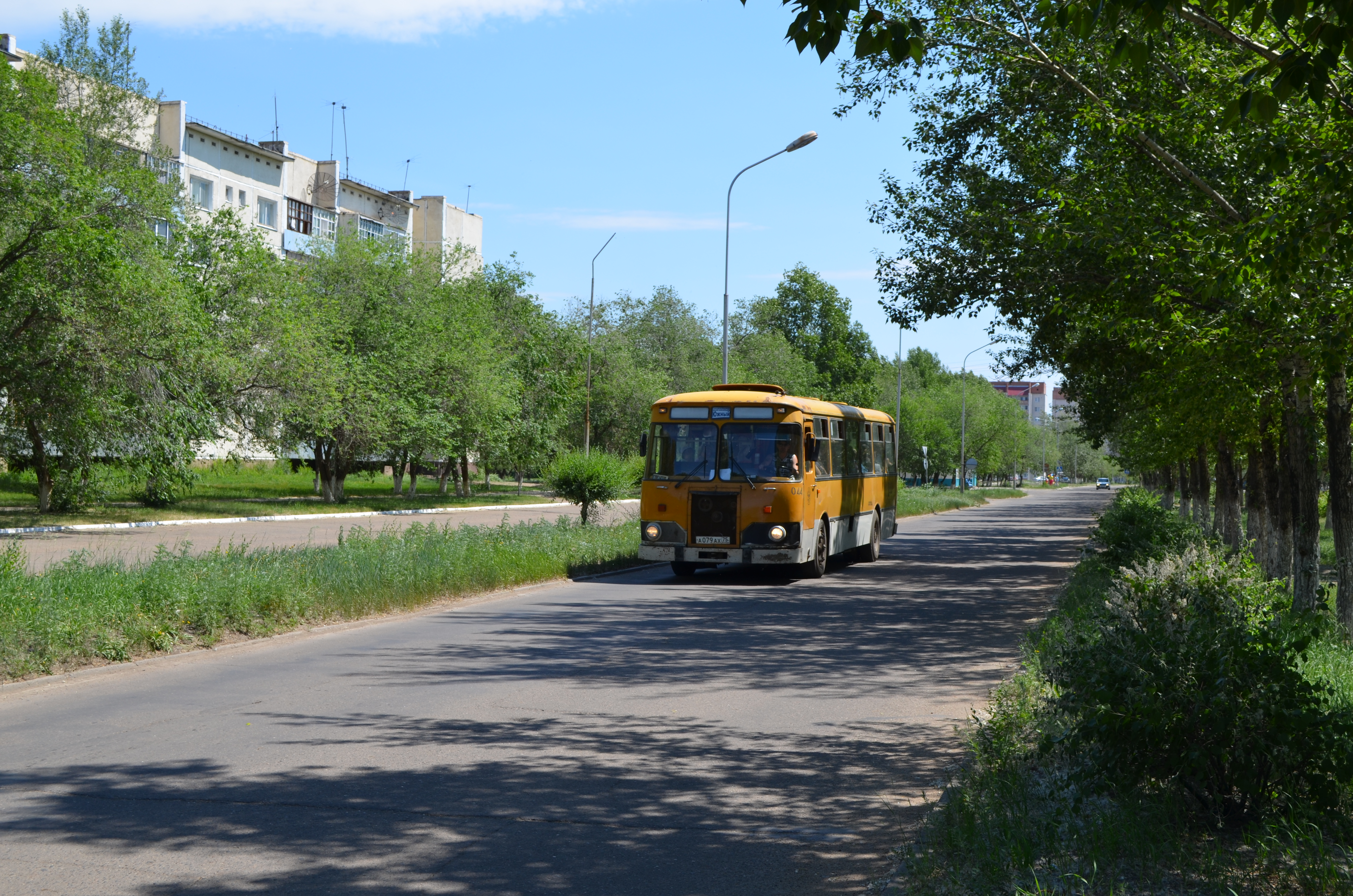
- A street in Krasnokamensk

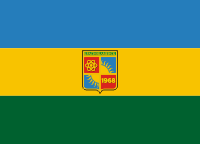
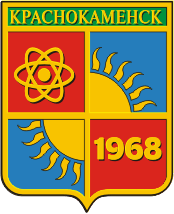
- Flag Coat of arms
- Interactive map of Krasnokamensk
- Location of Krasnokamensk Krasnokamensk (Zabaykalsky Krai)
- Coordinates: 50°06′N 118°02′E
- Country: Russia
- Federal subject: Zabaykalsky Krai
- Administrative district: Krasnokamensky District
- Founded: 1968
- Town status since: 1969
- Elevation: 640 m (2,100 ft)

Population (2010 Census)
  - Total: 55,666
  - Estimate (2025): 54,608 (−1.9%)
  - Rank: 295th in 2010

Administrative status
  - Capital of: Krasnokamensky District

Municipal status
  - Municipal district: Krasnokamensky Municipal District
  - Urban settlement: Krasnokamensk Urban Settlement
  - Capital of: Krasnokamensky Municipal District, Krasnokamensk Urban Settlement
- Time zone: UTC+9 (MSK+6)
- Postal codes: 674670, 674673, 674674, 674676, 674677, 674684
- Dialing code: +7 30245
- OKTMO ID: 76621101001
- Website: красно-каменск.рф

Krasnokamensk (Russian: Краснокаменск, IPA: [krəsnɐˈkamʲɪnsk]) is a town and the administrative center of Krasnokamensky District in Zabaykalsky Krai, Russia, located near the Sino-Russian border, 535 kilometers (332 mi) southeast of Chita, the administrative center of the krai. It is best known as the site for Russia's largest uranium mine. Population: 55,666 (2010 census); 55,920 (2002 census); 66,872 (1989 Soviet census).

Historical population
Year	Pop.	±%
1970	13,830	—
1979	50,970	+268.5%
1989	66,872	+31.2%
2002	55,920	−16.4%
2010	55,666	−0.5%
2021	51,137	−8.1%
Source: Census data

== Etymology ==
The name translates roughly as town on red stone, with the reference to the color red reflecting both the actual rock formations in the area, as well as its political symbolism in the Soviet era.

== History ==
It was founded in 1968, in conjunction with the commencement of mining of the Streltsovskoye uranium deposits, which had been discovered near the present site of the city in 1963. The settlement grew quickly and was granted town status in 1969.

From October 2005 until December 2006, Mikhail Khodorkovsky was jailed in Krasnokamensk on his conviction for tax evasion and fraud.

== Administrative and municipal status ==
Within the framework of administrative divisions, Krasnokamensk serves as the administrative center of Krasnokamensky District, to which it is directly subordinated. As a municipal division, the town of Krasnokamensk, together with one rural locality (the settlement of Oktyabrsky), is incorporated within Krasnokamensky Municipal District as Krasnokamensk Urban Settlement.

== Economy ==
The town is best known for its uranium mine – Priargunsky mine – the largest in Russia, located 10–20 km from Krasnokamensk. Priargunsky represents one of the largest uranium reserves in Russia having estimated reserves of 71.9 million tonnes of ore grading 0.16% uranium.

The full name of the complex is the Priargunsky Mining-Chemical Production Association (PPGHO), which consists of a uranium mines, processing mills and tailings as well as a lignite mine and power plant along with a manganese casting plant and mill.

In 1995, 5 million pounds of uranium were produced. In 1996, it was reported that over the previous 17 years, 10 km of stream bed had been contaminated with radiation levels of 170 microroentgen/hr, 10 times the world-wide average. In 1998 it was reported that the area produced 2,470 tonnes of uranium contained in ore and that over the lifetime of the mine, more than 100,000 tonnes had been mined. In 1998 and 2002 it was reported that this location was the only active uranium production location in Russia during the previous decades. In 2001, it was reported the area was once the world's largest uranium mining and processing center and in 2001 it was the world's fifth largest. In 2001, it was reported that the uranium deposit could be depleted by 2026. In 2006, the area produced 2900 tonnes of uranium, which made it the fourth largest producer with 7% of the total world production.

Molybdenum is also mined in the town's vicinity, with associated chemical plants producing sulfuric acid and lubricants.

=== Pollution ===
According to the Blacksmith Institute, Krasnokamensk has generated fifty to seventy-five million tons of tailings, making it the largest waste stream at a uranium production site in the world. A Baley community survey documents hundreds of homes with radiation levels as much as 10–20 times the permissible levels. About 500–1000 homes or more suffer from radiation exposures far above international standards.

In recent years, the dangerously high levels of radioactivity led to evacuation and resettlement of residents living near the tailing dumps.

=== Transport ===
A branch railway has connected the town to Russia's rail network since 1972. Krasnokamensk is served by the Krasnokamensk Airport.

== Climate ==
Despite its relatively southerly latitude in Siberia, Krasnokamensk has a monsoon influenced subarctic climate (Köppen climate classification Dwc), bordering very closely on a humid continental climate (Dwb). The summers are short but very warm whereas winters are severely cold. Precipitation is heavily concentrated in the warmest months.

Climate data for Krasnokamensk
Month	Jan	Feb	Mar	Apr	May	Jun	Jul	Aug	Sep	Oct	Nov	Dec	Year
Mean daily maximum °C (°F)	−20.4 (−4.7)	−15.5 (4.1)	−4.9 (23.2)	8.0 (46.4)	17.6 (63.7)	24.1 (75.4)	26.0 (78.8)	23.3 (73.9)	16.4 (61.5)	6.7 (44.1)	−7.4 (18.7)	−17.8 (0.0)	4.7 (40.4)
Daily mean °C (°F)	−26.8 (−16.2)	−23.1 (−9.6)	−12.6 (9.3)	1.0 (33.8)	9.9 (49.8)	16.7 (62.1)	19.8 (67.6)	17.1 (62.8)	9.6 (49.3)	0.0 (32.0)	−13.8 (7.2)	−23.7 (−10.7)	−2.2 (28.1)
Mean daily minimum °C (°F)	−33.1 (−27.6)	−30.6 (−23.1)	−20.2 (−4.4)	−6.0 (21.2)	2.2 (36.0)	9.4 (48.9)	13.6 (56.5)	10.9 (51.6)	2.8 (37.0)	−6.7 (19.9)	−20.1 (−4.2)	−29.6 (−21.3)	−9.0 (15.9)
Average precipitation mm (inches)	2 (0.1)	3 (0.1)	4 (0.2)	12 (0.5)	21 (0.8)	56 (2.2)	107 (4.2)	80 (3.1)	39 (1.5)	8 (0.3)	4 (0.2)	4 (0.2)	340 (13.4)

== Sister city ==
- Manzhouli, China

== Sources ==
- Министерство территориального развития Забайкальского края. 1 января 2014 г. «Реестр административно-территориальных единиц и населённых пунктов Забайкальского края», в ред. Распоряжения №209-р от 10 июня 2014 г.. (Ministry of the Territorial Development of Zabaykalsky Krai. January 1, 2014 Registry of the Administrative-Territorial Units and the Inhabited Localities of Zabaykalsky Krai, as amended by the Directive #209-r of June 10, 2014. ).
- Законодательное Собрание Забайкальского края. Закон №317-ЗЗК от 18 декабря 2009 г. «О границах сельских и городских поселений Забайкальского края», в ред. Закона №1070-ЗЗК от 31 октября 2014 г. «О внесении изменений в Закон Забайкальского края "О границах сельских и городских поселений Забайкальского края"». Вступил в силу через десять дней после дня официального опубликования. Опубликован: "Забайкальский рабочий", №239–242, 21 декабря 2009 г. (Legislative Assembly of Zabaykalsky Krai. Law #317-ZZK of December 18, 2009 On the Borders of the Rural and Urban Settlements of Zabaykalsky Krai, as amended by the Law #1070-ZZK of October 31, 2014 On Amending the Law of Zabaykalsky Krai "On the Borders of the Rural and Urban Settlements of Zabaykalsky Krai". Effective as of the day which is ten days after the day of the official publication.).
- Законодательное Собрание Забайкальского края. Закон №316-ЗЗК от 18 декабря 2009 г. «О границах муниципальных районов и городских округов Забайкальского края», в ред. Закона №770-ЗЗК от 26 декабря 2012 г. «О внесении изменений в Закон Забайкальского края "О границах муниципальных районов и городских округов Забайкальского края"». Вступил в силу через десять дней после дня официального опубликования. Опубликован: "Забайкальский рабочий", №239–242, 21 декабря 2009 г. (Legislative Assembly of Zabaykalsky Krai. Law #316-ZZK of December 18, 2009 On the Borders of the Municipal Districts and Urban Okrugs of Zabaykalsky Krai, as amended by the Law #770-ZZK of December 26, 2012 On Amending the Law of Zabaykalsky Krai "On the Borders of the Municipal Districts and Urban Okrugs of Zabaykalsky Krai". Effective as of the day which is ten days after the day of the official publication.).
