= Krasnokamensky District =

Krasnokamensky District Краснокаменский район (Russian)
- District
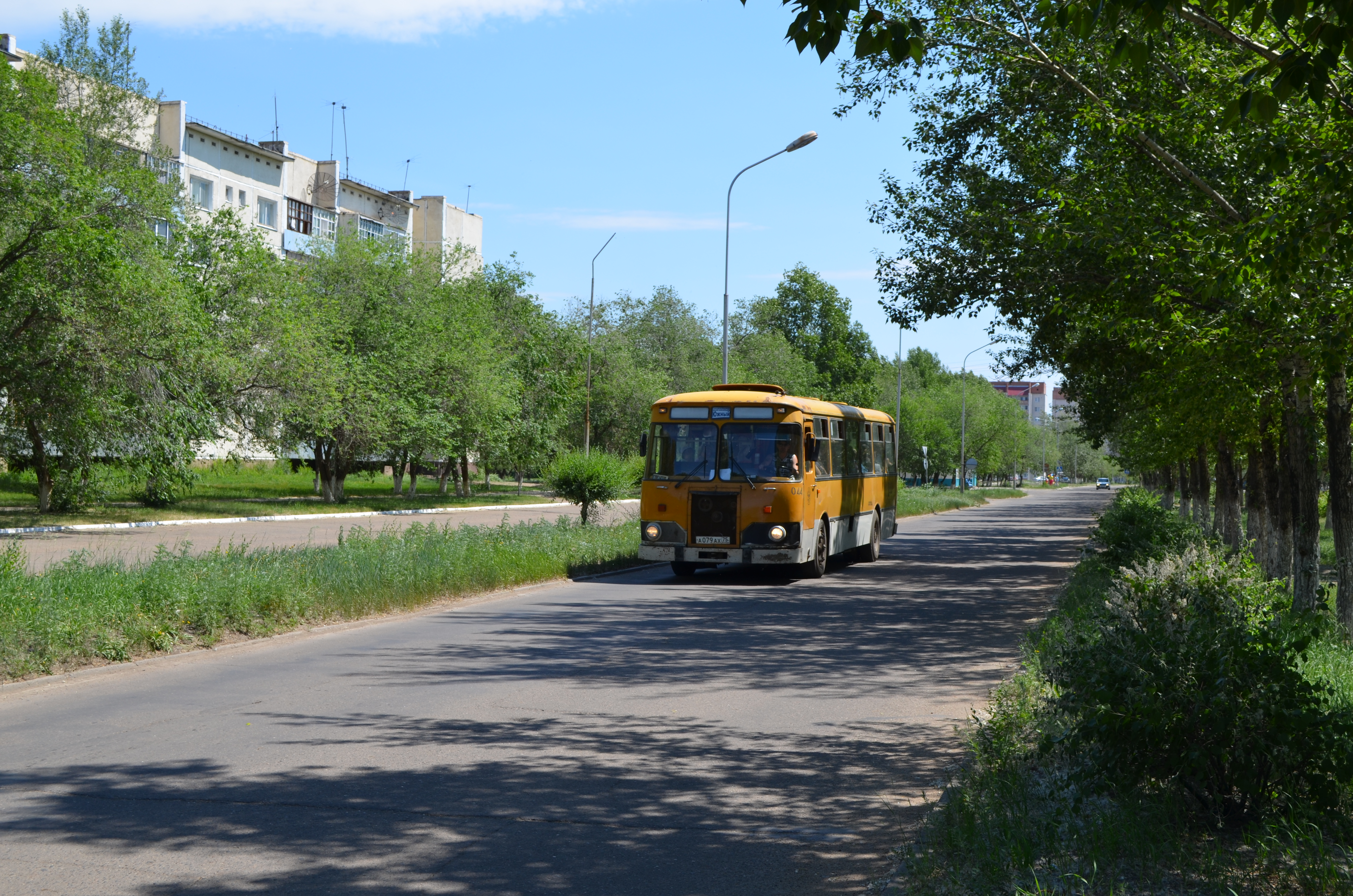
- Street in Krasnokamenska

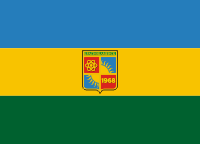
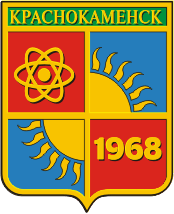
- Flag Coat of arms
- Location of Krasnokamensky District in Zabaykalsky Krai
- Coordinates: 50.064°N 118.135°E
- Country: Russia
- Federal subject: Zabaykalsky Krai
- Established: March 24, 1977
- Administrative center: Krasnokamensk

Area
  - Total: 5,300 km^{2} (2,000 sq mi)

Population (2010 Census)
  - Total: 64,597
  - Estimate (2018): 58,840 (−8.9%)
  - Density: 12/km^{2} (32/sq mi)
  - Urban: 86.2%
  - Rural: 13.8%

Administrative structure
  - Inhabited localities: 1 cities/towns, 14 rural localities

Municipal structure
  - Municipally incorporated as: Kalgansky Municipal District
  - Municipal divisions: 1 urban settlements, 9 rural settlements
- Time zone: UTC+9 (MSK+6)
- OKTMO ID: 76621000
- Website: http://adminkr.ru/

Krasnokamensky District (Russian: Краснока́менский райо́н) is an administrative and municipal district (raion), one of the thirty-one in Zabaykalsky Krai, Russia. It is located in the southeast of the krai, and borders with Priargunsky District in the north, and with Zabaykalsky District in the west. The area of the district is 5,300 square kilometers (2,000 sq mi). Its administrative center is the town of Krasnokamensk. Population: 64,597 (2010 census); 9,987 (2002 Census); 71,037 (1989 Soviet census). The population of Krasnokamensk accounts for 86.2% of the district's total population.

== History ==
The district was established on March 24, 1977.
