= Weiquan movement =

Non-centralized group of legal experts and intellectuals in China

- Simplified Chinese: 维权运动
- Traditional Chinese: 維權運動
- Literal meaning: protect rights movement
Transcriptions
Standard Mandarin
- Hanyu Pinyin: Wéiquán Yùndòng

The Weiquan movement is a non-centralized group of lawyers, legal experts, and intellectuals in the People's Republic of China who seek to protect and defend the civil rights of the citizenry through litigation and legal activism. The movement, which began in the early 2000s, has organized demonstrations, sought reform via the legal system and media, defended victims of human rights abuses, and written appeal letters, despite opposition from the Chinese Communist Party (CCP). Among the issues adopted by Weiquan lawyers are property and housing rights, protection for AIDS victims, environmental damage, religious freedom, freedom of speech and the press, and defending the rights of other lawyers facing disbarment or imprisonment.

Individuals involved in the Weiquan movement have met with occasionally harsh reprisals from Chinese government officials, including disbarment, detention, harassment, and, in extreme instances, torture. Authorities have also responded to the movement with the launch of an education campaign on the "socialist concept of rule of law", which reasserts the role of the CCP and the primacy of political considerations in the legal profession, and with the Three Supremes, which entrenches the supremacy of the CCP in the judicial process.

According to the Human Rights Watch (HRW), Xi Jinping has "started a broad and sustained offensive on human rights" since he became General Secretary of the Chinese Communist Party in 2012. Since taking power, Xi has cracked down on grassroots activism, with hundreds being detained. He presided over the 709 crackdown on 9 July 2015, which saw more than 200 lawyers, legal assistants and human rights activists being detained. The HRW also said that repression in China is "at its worst level since the Tiananmen Square massacre."

== Background ==
Since the legal reforms of the late 1970s and 1980s, the Chinese Communist Party (CCP) has moved to embrace the language of the rule of law and establish a modern court system. In the process, it has enacted thousands of new laws and regulations, and begun training more legal professionals. The concept of "rule of law" was enshrined in the constitution, and the CCP embarked on campaigns to publicize the idea that citizens have protection under the law. At the same time, however, a fundamental contradiction exists in the implementation of rule of law wherein the CCP insists that its authority supersedes that of the law; the constitution enshrines rule of law, but also emphasizes the principle of the "leadership of the Communist Party". The judiciary is not independent, and is therefore subject to politicization and control by the CCP. This has produced a system that is often described as "rule by law", rather than rule of law.

Because judicial decisions are subject to the sometimes arbitrary assessments of the CCP, citizens who attempt to make use of the legal system to pursue grievances find that, if their cause is determined to have the potential to undermine the authority of the CCP, they may be suppressed. Defendants who find themselves facing criminal charges, such as for conducting activism or for their religious beliefs, often have few means of pursuing an effective defense.

The Weiquan movement coalesced in the early 2000s in response to these inherent contradictions and the arbitrary exercise of legal authority in China, though its roots could be traced to the consumer protection movement that began in the 1990s. The movement is informal, and can be understood as including lawyers and legal activists who advocate for civil rights and defend the interests of citizens against corporations, government or CCP organs. Fu Hualing and Richard Cullen note that Weiquan lawyers "are generally always on the side of the weaker party: (migrant) workers v. employers in labor disputes; peasants in cases involving taxation, persons contesting environmental pollution, land appropriation, and village committee elections; journalists facing government censorship; defendants subject to criminal prosecution; and ordinary citizens who are discriminated against by government policies and actions."

The emergence of the Weiquan movement was made possible by a confluence of factors, including a market for their services, and an emerging rights consciousness. It was also facilitated by the 1996 "Lawyers Law", which changed the definition of lawyers from "state legal workers" to professionals holding a legal certificate who perform legal services. The law effectively delinked lawyers from the state, and gave lawyers greater (though still limited) autonomy within the profession.

Weiquan lawyers tend to be especially critical of the lack of judicial independence in China. Rather than challenging particular laws, they frame their work as being in keeping with Chinese laws, and describe their activities as a means of defending and upholding the Constitution of China against abuses. As such, Weiquan lawyering has been described as a form of rightful resistance.

== Weiquan lawyers ==
Weiquan lawyers (Chinese: 維權律師), or "rights protection" lawyers, refer to a small but influential movement of lawyers, legal practitioners, scholars and activists who help Chinese citizens to assert their constitutional, civil rights and/or public interest through litigation and legal activism. In the context of a rising number of lawyers in China, the proportion of Weiquan lawyers is very small. Weiquan Lawyers face considerable personal, financial and professional risks. Weiquan lawyers represent many cases regarding labour rights, land rights, official corruption, victims of torture, migrants' rights. Since the 1980s, as the PRC's leadership became cognizant of the importance of the legal system and legal profession to advance economic development, training for lawyers dramatically increased. From 1986 to 1992, the number of lawyers in the country more than doubled from 21,500 to 45,000, and by 2008 had reached 143,000. The proportion of Weiquan lawyers is very small relative to the number of legal professionals in China. The number of lawyers actively focusing on civil rights issues has been estimated by legal scholar Teng Biao to number "only a few dozen". The lawyers face considerable personal and professional obstacles, and Weiquan lawyering demands substantial commitment to their cause. According to Fu Hualing and Richard Cullen, "Weiquan lawyers act principally out of commitment, not because of any financial concerns. They accept Weiquan cases to pursue their cause, and typically charge no legal fees." The lawyers often face threats, harassment, and even detention when taking on cases, and they find themselves targets of repression ahead of sensitive events.

Notable Weiquan Lawyers include He Weifang, Xu Zhiyong, Teng Biao, Guo Feixiong and Chen Guangcheng, Gao Zhisheng, Zheng Enchong, and Li Heping. Many barefoot lawyers are peasants who teach themselves enough law to file civil complaints, engage in litigation, and educate fellow citizens about their rights. Some Weiquan lawyers are the pragmatists and some are more radical.

=== Types of Weiquan lawyers ===
Weiquan activists include law professors with university teaching positions—including He Weifang, Teng Biao, and Xu Zhiyong—professional lawyers, and "barefoot lawyers", who are self-taught and often lack any formal legal education. Several of China's more high-profile Weiquan lawyers fall into the latter category, including Guo Feixiong and Chen Guangcheng. Many barefoot lawyers are peasants who teach themselves enough law to file civil complaints, engage in litigation, and educate fellow citizens about their rights.

Because corporate law firms are generally not hospitable to Weiquan lawyers and legal aid workers operate within the government system, Weiquan lawyers in large cities tend to work as solo practitioners in partnership firms with other like-minded lawyers. The Beijing Global Law Firm and Yitong Law Firm are examples of such organizations.

Rana Siu Inboden and William Inboden note that a disproportionate number of influential Weiquan lawyers identify with the Christian faith, including Gao Zhisheng, Chen Guangcheng, Zheng Enchong, and Li Heping, among others.

=== Different approaches ===
There are at least two distinctive (and sometimes competing) approaches to Weiquan activism. Among Weiquan lawyers, the pragmatists (or consequentialists) are more deferential to the existing legal systems and institutions, and only pursue courses of actions that are likely to produce incremental improvements and reforms. These activists may reject approaches that are liable to be met with official reprisals. By contrast, the "radical" Weiquan activists (those adopting a deontological approach) view rights defending as a moral obligation that is to be pursued regardless of potential consequences. Radical lawyers such as Gao Zhisheng are more inclined to take on the most "sensitive" cases—such as those of Falun Gong adherents—simply because it is the "right thing to do", even though the prospects of success are minimal. A pragmatist may become radicalized once they encounter the limits of possible reform.

== Major fields ==
=== Freedom of expression ===
Although freedom of speech is enshrined in Article 35 of the Constitution of China, Chinese authorities enforce restrictions on political and religious expression. Such restrictions are sometimes in accordance with Article 105 of the criminal code, which contains vague and broadly defined provisions against "inciting subversion of state power". Weiquan lawyers, along with international human rights organizations, have argued that the provisions against subversion are inconsistent both with China's own constitution and with international human rights standards, particularly in light of the lack of transparency and clear guidelines used in applying the laws.

Several Weiquan lawyers have been involved in litigation and other forms of advocacy to defend the rights to free expression for individuals charged with the crime of subversion. Notable cases include that of Liu Xiaobo, a prominent Beijing intellectual sentenced to 11 years in prison for inciting subversion in December 2009. Chengdu activist Tan Zuoren was sentenced to five years for inciting subversion for publishing writings on the 1989 Tiananmen Square protests and massacre, advocating for the families of the 2008 Sichuan earthquake victims, and accepting interviews from the Falun Gong-affiliated Sound of Hope radio. His lawyers were reportedly barred from entering the courtroom. In October 2009, intellectual Guo Quan was sentenced to 10 years in prison for publishing "reactionary" articles online.

Weiquan lawyers have also challenged the application of state secret laws, which are sometimes used to prosecute individuals who disseminate information on politically sensitive issues. In November 2009, for instance, lawyers were involved in arguing for Huang Qi, a Sichuan activist who had advocated online for the parents of Sichuan earthquake victims. Huang was sentenced to three years in prison for possession of state secrets.

=== Judicial independence ===
The Chinese Constitution enshrines rule of law, but simultaneously emphasizes the principle of the "leadership of the Communist Party". The legal profession itself is subordinate to the authority of the CCP; the Ministry of Justice, not the bar associations, is responsible for issuing and renewing lawyers' licenses. Weiquan lawyers have argued that this structure precludes the emergence of genuine rule of law, and in some cases have advocated for reforms to advance judicial independence and the protection of legal professionals.

In late August 2008, a collection of several dozen Beijing lawyers signed a petition stating that the Beijing Bar Association leaders should be elected by the organization's members, rather than being appointed. The petition letter stated that selection process in place for the Association's directors is inconsistent with official guidelines and the Chinese constitution, and should be replaced with a democratic voting process. The Beijing Bar Association responded to the campaign by asserting that "Any individual who uses text messages, the web or other media to privately promote and disseminate the concept of direct elections, express controversial opinions, thereby spreading rumors within the Beijing Bar Association, confuse and poison people's minds, and convince people of circumstances that do not exist regarding the so-called 'Call For Direct Elections For the Beijing Bar Association' is illegal." The following year, the Beijing Bureau of Justice refused to renew the licenses of 53 Beijing Weiquan lawyers, all of whom had signed the petition for elections to the Bar Association.

=== Land rights ===
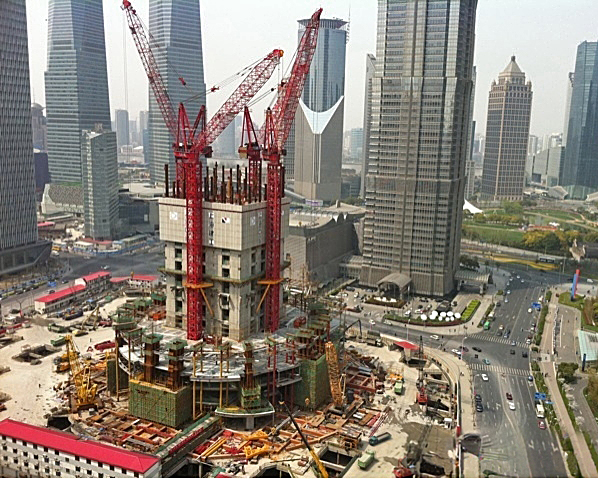
The practice of land requisitions and forced evictions is widespread in China as local governments make way for private real estate developers.

Under Chinese property law, there is no privately held land; "urban land" is owned by the state, which grants land rights for a set number of years. Rural, or "collectively owned land", is leased by the state for periods of 30 years, and is theoretically reserved for agricultural purposes, housing and services for farmers.

Forced evictions are forbidden under International Covenant on Economic, Social and Cultural Rights, which China has ratified. Under China's constitution and other property laws, expropriation of urban land is permitted only if it is for the purpose of supporting the "public interest", and those being evicted are supposed to receive compensation, resettlement, and protection of one's living conditions. The "public interest" is not defined, however, and abuses are common in the expropriation process, with many citizens complaining of receiving little or no compensation.

Forced evictions with little or no compensation occur frequently in both urban and rural China, with even fewer legal protections for rural citizens. Collectively owned rural land may be "reallocated" at the discretion of authorities, and in many regions local governments collude with private developers to reclassify rural land as urban land, which can then be sold. from the mid-1990s to mid-2000s, an estimated 40 million Chinese peasants were affected by land requisitions. Citizens who resist or protest the evictions have reportedly been subjected to harassment, beatings, or detention, and land-related grievances occasionally escalate into large-scale protests or riots.

Several Weiquan lawyers have advocated for the rights of individual citizens whose land and homes were taken with inadequate compensation, including Shanghai lawyer Zheng Enchong. Ni Yulan, a Beijing lawyer, was herself left homeless by forced eviction, and became an outspoken advocate for victims before being sentenced to two years in prison.

In 2007, a 54-year-old farmer in Heilongjiang Yang Chunlin published numerous articles on human rights and land rights, and helped to organise a petition entitled: "We want human rights, not the Olympics". The petition reportedly collected over ten thousand signatures. Yang was put to trial, and sentenced to five years in prison, where he has allegedly been tortured. Li Fangping was hired to defend him, but was denied access to his client.

In 2012, He Zhihua died while protesting nearby road construction and government relocation.

=== Defense of ethnic minorities ===
Several Weiquan lawyers, including Teng Biao, Jiang Tianyong, and Li Fangping, offered legal aid to Tibetans in the wake of the March 2008 Tibetan protests. The protests resulted in the imprisonment of at least 670 Tibetans, and the execution of at least four individuals. Chinese government sources asserted that the unrest and violence in Tibet had been masterminded by the Dalai Lama and executed by his followers for the purpose of fomenting unrest and disrupting the 2008 Summer Olympics in Beijing. The Open Constitution Initiative (OCI), operated by several Weiquan lawyers and intellectuals, issued a paper in May 2009 challenging the official narrative, and suggesting that the protests were instead a response to economic inequities, Han Chinese migration, and religious sentiments. The OCI recommended that Chinese authorities better respect and protect the rights and interests of the Tibetan people, including religious freedom, and pursue the reduction of economic inequality and official corruption.

Tibetan Filmmaker Dhondup Wangcheng was sentenced to six years in prison for making a documentary on human rights in Tibet in the run-up to the Beijing Olympics. Two lawyers who sought to represent him, Chang Boyang and Li Dunyong, faced threats and harassment for their advocacy.

In July 2010, a group of Chinese activists including Teng Biao co-signed a letter to the Chinese leadership to protest the 15-year prison sentence that had been meted out to Uighur journalist Halaite Niyaze. Niyaze was not permitted to have a lawyer at his trial, where he was charged with "endangering state security". According to reports, Niyaze was being charged because he had criticized the Chinese government in an interview with a Hong Kong news agency for not doing enough to prevent the July 2009 Ürümqi riots.

=== Falun Gong ===
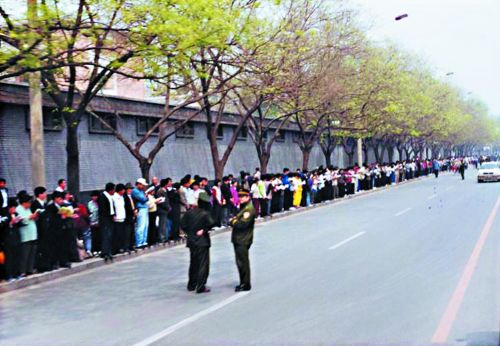
Falun Gong practitioners demonstrate outside the Zhongnanhai compound in April 1999 to demand official recognition. The practice was banned three months later.

Falun Gong, a spiritual practice that once claimed tens of million adherents in China, was banned throughout China in July 1999, and a campaign was launched to suppress the group. In an attempt to have Falun Gong adherents renounce their belief in the practice, they are subject to state-sanctioned, systematic violence in custody, sometimes resulting in death. Some sources indicate hundreds of thousands may have been detained in reeducation-through-labor camps for practicing Falun Gong and/or resisting persecution.

In November 1999, the Supreme People's Court offered a judicial interpretation of article 300 of the criminal code, stating that Falun Gong should be regarded as a "xie jiao", or cult. Large numbers were subsequently sentenced to long prison terms, often under article 300, in what are typically very short trials without the presence of a lawyer. Human rights groups, including Amnesty International, note that the application of the law to persecute Falun Gong adherents contravenes both China's own constitution and international standards. Several Weiquan lawyers have argued similarly while defending Falun Gong adherents who face criminal or administrative sentencing for their beliefs. Lawyers who have defended Falun Gong include Guo Guoting, Zhang Kai and Li Chunfu, Wang Yonghang, Tang Jitian and Liu Wei, among others.

In addition to litigation work, Weiquan lawyers like Gao Zhisheng have also advocated publicly and in the media for human rights for Falun Gong. In 2004 and 2005, Gao wrote a series of letters to China's top leadership detailing accounts of torture and sexual abuse against Falun Gong practitioners, and calling for an end to the persecution of the group. In response, Gao lost his legal license, was put under house arrest, detained, and was reportedly tortured.

=== HIV/AIDS ===
Some Weiquan lawyers have advocated for the rights of HIV/AIDS victims who contracted the virus as a result of state-sponsored blood drives. In the 1990s, government officials in central China, and especially in Henan, encouraged rural citizens to sell blood plasma in order to supplement their incomes. Gross mismanagement of the process resulted in hundreds of thousands of individuals being infected with HIV. According to activists, victims have not been compensated, and no government officials were held accountable. Authorities continue to suppress information about the epidemic, which is particularly sensitive in light of the involvement of Li Changchun, the CCP Central Propaganda Department head and formerly Party chief in Henan.

Hu Jia is one of the most well known advocate for HIV/AIDS victims, having served as the executive director of the Beijing Aizhixing Institute of Health Education and as one of the founders of the non-governmental organization Loving Source.

=== Women's rights ===
Chen Guangcheng, a blind self-taught Weiquan lawyer, rose to prominence for defending victims of China's one-child policy. First implemented in 1979, the one-child policy mandates that couples may have only one child, though there are exceptions for some rural citizens, ethnic minorities, and couples who were themselves only children. Though Chinese laws condemn harsh enforcement measures, Chinese authorities and family planning staff have been accused of carrying out coercive, late-term forced abortions, sterilization, incarceration and torture to enforce the policy. In 2005, Chen Guangcheng filed a class-action case against family planning officials in Linyi, Shandong, who were accused of subjecting thousands of women to sterilization or forced abortions.

=== Underground Christians ===
China's constitution guarantees freedom of religion, yet also provides a caveat specifying that only "normal" religious activities are permitted. In practice, religious freedom is granted only within the strictly prescribed parameters of the five officially sanctioned "patriotic" religious associations of Buddhism, Taoism, Islam, Protestantism and Catholicism. Groups falling outside the state-administered religions, including "underground" or "house church" Christians, are subject to varying degrees of repression and persecution.

Although there are no definitive figures on the number of underground Christians in China, some estimates have put their total number in excess of 70 million. At least 40 Catholic bishops operate independently of official sanction, and some are under surveillance, house arrest, detention, or have disappeared. Several leaders and members of underground Protestant churches have also been detained and sentenced to reeducation through labor or prison terms. Violent raids and demolitions have been carried out on underground churches, sometimes resulting in injury to congregants inside. Chinese officials have labelled several underground Protestant churches as a xie jiao (translated literally as "evil religion"), or cult, thus providing a pretext for harsher punishment of members.

Several prominent Weiquan lawyers themselves identify with the underground Protestant movement, and have sought to defend church members and leaders facing imprisonment. These include Zhang Kai, Li Heping, and Gao Zhisheng. Former house church leader Bob Fu's US-based organization ChinaAid has sponsored legal cases, and provided "rule-of-law training" and legal help for distressed clients in China.

=== Other initiatives ===
A number of specific events have attracted the help and attention of Weiquan activists. In the March 2008 earthquake in Sichuan province, shoddy school construction resulted in the collapse of several schools full of students. A number of Weiquan lawyers, including Tan Zuoren, were involved in advocating for the rights of parents, and in investigating allegations that corrupt officials were responsible for the poor construction. Parents and lawyers met with reprisals from Chinese officials for their activism.

Later the same year, it was revealed that large quantities of infant formula had been tainted with melamine, causing 300,000 infants to fall ill and resulting in several deaths. A group of parents of the victims were reportedly detained for attempting to draw media attention to their plight. Dozens of lawyers—particularly from the provinces of Hebei, Henan and Shandong—offered pro-bono legal services to victims, but their efforts were obstructed by authorities.

Individual human rights cases, such as the Deng Yujiao incident and the death of Qian Yunhui, have also drawn help from rights defenders such as Wu Gan.

In 2003, a group of legal scholars, including Teng Biao and Xu Zhiyong, formed the Open Constitution Initiative (Chinese: 公盟) to advocate for greater rule of law. The organization was involved in the Sun Zhigang case, and has advocated for petitioners, labor rights, freedom of expression, HIV/AIDS victims, Tibetans, land rights, and protection of public health, among other issues.

== Government response ==
=== Retrenchment on rule of law ===
In response to the emergence of the Weiquan movement, which often makes use of the official language about "rule of law" to justify its work, in April 2006 a political campaign was launched to solidify the CCP's leadership over judicial work, combat the idea of greater independence for judges and lawyers, and educate people and judicial authorities about the "socialist concept of rule of law". The campaign was announced by Luo Gan, then the head of the CCP Central Committee's Political and Legislative Affairs Committee. Luo urged that in order to protect political stability, "forceful measures" be adopted "against those who, under the pretext of rights-protection (weiquan), carry out sabotage." The launch of the campaign coincided with a crackdown on Weiquan lawyers.

Shortly after the campaign's launch, CCP Committees provided instruction to judges reminding them of the political goals that their work must uphold. According to one document issued to judges in Zhejiang and quoted by Human Rights Watch, "Recently, some judges have started to believe that to be a judge you just have to strictly apply the law in a case. In fact, this kind of concept is erroneous [...] all the legal formulations have a clear political background and direction [...] We must stamp out the kind of narrow viewpoint that thinks that you can also do court work by having judicial independence."

During a December 2007 conference on political-legal work, CCP general secretary Hu Jintao articulated the theory of the "Three Supremes", which emphasized again that legal work should regard as supreme the concerns and interests of the CCP. In March 2008, Wang Shengjun was confirmed as the new head of the Supreme People's Court. Wang, who has no formal legal training himself, abandoned the efforts of his predecessors to improve judicial competence, training, and autonomy, and instead placed primary importance on the ideological implications of the "Three Supremes" theory and upholding the leadership of the CCP.

In 2010, China's Ministry of Justice issued two new regulations intended to "strengthen the supervision and management of lawyers and law firms". According to the Associated Press, the new regulations would serve to "allow authorities to punish lawyers ... for actions such as talking to the media or even causing 'traffic troubles.'"

In March 2012, China's Ministry of Justice issued a new directive requiring lawyers first obtaining their license or renewing an existing license to swear an oath of loyalty to the CCP. According to the Ministry's website, a section of oath includes the following: “I swear to faithfully fulfill the sacred mission of legal workers in socialism with Chinese characteristics. I swear my loyalty to the motherland, to the people, to uphold the leadership of the Communist Party of China and the socialist system, and to protect the dignity of the Constitution and laws."

=== Suppression of lawyers and coercive measures ===
Weiquan lawyers have faced various challenges to their work from the Chinese government, including disbarment or suspension, violence, threats, surveillance, arbitrary detention, and prosecution. This is particularly true for lawyers who take up politically sensitive cases. Reports of harassment, intimidation, and violence against Weiquan lawyers increased in 2006 following the launch of the campaign to promote the "socialist concept of the rule of law". Authorities have refused to renew the licenses of several dozen Weiquan lawyers, and several have effectively been banned for life from the legal profession. In 2009, for instance, at least 17 Weiquan lawyers were not permitted to renew their legal licenses after taking on politically sensitive cases. Several Weiquan lawyers have themselves been sentenced to prison in response to their activism. A selection of notable instances of suppression are listed here:

- Gao Zhisheng, once recognized as one of China's ten most promising lawyers, was an advocate for a range of disenfranchised individuals and minorities. In 2006, after he wrote a series of letters to the Chinese leadership concerning the torture of Falun Gong adherents, Gao had his legal license revoked and his law firm was shut down. His family was placed under house arrest, and he was detained for six months. Gao was sentenced, with a five-year reprieve, to four years in prison. He has been the subject of several prolonged disappearances into custody, during which he has reportedly been tortured.
- On 27 December 2007, AIDS and pro-democracy activist Hu Jia was detained as part of a crackdown on dissents during the run-up to the 2008 Beijing Olympics. A well known rights advocate who had advocated on behalf of AIDS victims, peasants, victims of land requisitions, Hu had also been critical of the lack of human rights progress that had been made ahead of the Olympic games. Hu pleaded not guilty at his trial in March 2008. On 3 April 2008, he was sentenced to 3.5 years in prison for "inciting subversion of state power". He had previously been under house arrest, and has reportedly been beaten by police.
- In response to his work to bring a class action lawsuit against family planning authorities in Linyi, Shandong Province in 2005, Chen Guangcheng was put under house arrest, threatened, detained, and beaten. Three other Weiquan activists – Li Fangping, Li Subin, and Xu Zhiyong— visited him to offer support, but were themselves beaten and interrogated. On 24 August 2006, he was sentenced to four years and three months in prison for "damaging property and gathering crowds to disturb transport order". Following his release, he remains under house arrest.
- On 22 April 2010, Beijing lawyers Liu Wei and Tang Jitian were permanently disbarred for defending Falun Gong practitioners.
- On 13 May 2009, lawyers Zhang Kai and Li Chunfu are violently beaten and detained in Chongqing for investigating the death of Jiang Xiqing, a 66-year-old Falun Gong practitioner killed in a labor camp. One month earlier, Beijing lawyer Cheng Hai was similarly beaten by police in Sichuan province for seeking to defend a Falun Gong adherent.
- Yang Chunlin was arrested in July 2007 and charged with "inciting subversion of state power". His trial began in February 2008 in the city of Jiamusi. Yang was sentenced to five years in prison on 24 March 2008. He maintained his innocence throughout the trial. During and after the hearing at which he was sentenced, Yang was reportedly beaten with an electric rod on at least two occasions.
- On 4 July 2009, around 20 security agents broke into the home of Wang Yonghang. Wang, a Weiquan lawyer from Dalian City, had defended Falun Gong adherents. He was taken into custody for interrogation and was reportedly beaten severely. Wang's lawyers were not permitted to contact him. In November 2009, Wang was sentenced in a closed court to seven years in prison for his advocacy on behalf of Falun Gong practitioners. When his lawyers were permitted to see him in January 2010, they reported that he had been tortured.
- On 17 July 2009, authorities in Beijing raided and shuttered the Open Constitution Initiative, an NGO established by legal scholars Teng Biao and Xu Zhiyong.
- On 20 February 2011, several Weiquan activists were detained following online calls for pro-democracy protests in China, including Chen Wei, Jiang Tianyong, Tang Jitian, and Teng Biao.
- In May 2014, as multiple Chinese activists began preparing for the 25th anniversary of the Tiananmen Square protests of 1989, a number of lawyers were arrested for planning or being suspected of planning demonstrations. Among those arrested was Pu Zhiqiang, a lawyer who was involved in organising the demonstrations in 1989.

== International response ==
Although there is relatively little awareness of the Weiquan phenomenon as a movement outside of China, Western governments and human rights organizations have consistently expressed concern over the treatment of individual Weiquan lawyers in China, some of whom have faced disbarment, imprisonment, prolonged disappearance, sentencing and alleged torture for their work in promoting civil rights and speaking out against the CCP's one-party rule. In October 2010, a bipartisan group of 29 members of the U.S. House of Representatives pressed President Obama to raise the cases of Liu Xiaobo and Gao Zhisheng with the Chinese leadership, writing of Gao Zhizheng's prolonged detention: "If lawyers are hauled away for the 'crime' of defending their clients, then even the pretense of rule of law in China has failed." The U.S. State Department claims to have raised the cases of these two individuals with their Chinese counterparts.

In 2008, Hu Jia was awarded the Sakharov Prize by the European Parliament recognizing his human rights advocacy. The same year, Hu and Gao Zhisheng received nominations for the Nobel Peace Prize, and were considered to be favorites for the award. Two years later, seven members of the U.S. House of Representatives nominated imprisoned lawyers Gao Zhisheng and Chen Guangcheng, along with fellow dissident Liu Xiaobo for the prize. The letter noted that these individuals have sought to "raise the Chinese people's awareness of their dignity and rights, and to call their government to govern within its constitution, its laws, and the international human rights agreements it has signed", and thereby made a significant contribution to peace. The Nobel Prize Committee awarded the honor to Liu in absentia in December 2010.

== See also ==
- Deng Yujiao incident
- Human rights in the People's Republic of China
- Protest and dissent in the People's Republic of China
