= Political offences in China =

During the Maoist era in the People's Republic of China, particularly during the Anti-Rightist Movement and the Cultural Revolution, the judicial system was often used for political persecution of rivals, and penalties such as jail terms or capital punishment were largely imposed on the authority's political enemies, or anyone who attempted to challenge it. During those times, vague accusations such as "counter-revolutionary" (Chinese: 反革命), "capitalist roader" (走资本主义路线), "running dog of the imperialist" (帝国主义走狗) could have had the accused imprisoned, or shot by firing squad. These labels fell out of use following the end of the Cultural Revolution in 1976.

In more recent times, accusations such as "illegal possession of state secret" (非法持有国家机密) and "inciting subversion of state power" (煽动颠覆国家政权) carry long jail terms. The vague charge of "picking quarrels and provoking trouble" has also been frequently used to detain human rights activists.

== Former (1949–1990) ==
=== Rightist ===
"Rightists" officially referred to those intellectuals who appeared to favour capitalism and against collectivization during the Anti-Rightist Movement. It was estimated that 550,000 Chinese were prosecuted as a result.

=== Counter-revolution ===
The crime of counter-revolution (Chinese: 反革命) was established in February 1951, involving accusations such as the following:

- collaborating with foreign forces
- to incite government officials, military personnel and/or people's militia to revolt;
- taking part in a group revolt using weapons
- taking part in special agents and/or spy organization

The term was used during the Campaign to Suppress Counterrevolutionaries to target former Kuomintang elements and other opposition against the PRC government.

According to Article 28 of the Chinese constitution, "The state maintains public order and suppresses treasonable and other counter-revolutionary activities; it penalizes actions that endanger public security and disrupt the socialist economy and other criminal activities, and punishes and reforms criminals."

The charge was used to label Lin Biao after his death in 1971 from a plane crash. He was alleged to have been planning a coup against Mao Zedong, and Mao's wife Jiang Qing used the opportunity to launch the Criticize Lin, Criticize Confucius campaign against her political rivals. Subsequently, the charge was used against Jiang Qing herself following the death of Mao in 1976.

In 1997, this law was replaced by a new law: Inciting subversion of the government. In 2008 the law received media attention when Professor Yang Siquan (杨师群) of East China University of Political Science and Law was reported to police by his students for alleged counter-revolutionary activities.

==== Accused ====
- He Long, at the beginning of the Cultural Revolution in 1966. He Long died in confinement in 1969, and was rehabilitated in 1974.
- Jiang Qing and the Gang of Four, at the end of the Cultural Revolution in 1980. Jiang received life imprisonment, and committed suicide in 1991 while in prison. Charges against Jiang and the Gang of Four still remain.
- Kang Sheng, who died in 1975, was posthumously accused of the crime in 1980 and had his party membership stripped.
- Lin Biao, during the Criticize Lin, Criticize Confucius campaign in 1973, and onwards. Lin Biao and his family died in 1971 died in a plane crash when trying to fly out of China. Charges against him still remain.
- Lin Zhao, during the Hundred Flowers Movement in 1960. She was executed in prison in 1968.
- Liu Shaoqi, during the Cultural Revolution in 1967. He died in 1969 as a result of torture and medical neglect, and was rehabilitated in 1980.
- Peng Dehuai, during the Cultural Revolution in 1966. He died in 1974, and was rehabilitated in 1978.
- Harry Wu, during the Hundred Flowers Campaign in 1956.
- Zhang Zhixin, during the Cultural Revolution in 1969. She was executed in prison in 1975, and was rehabilitated in 1979.

=== Capitalist roader ===
Capitalist roaders as described to be representatives of the capitalist class within the Chinese Communist Party, as well as those who attempt to restore capitalism. Liu Shaoqi and Deng Xiaoping were the two most famous "Capitalist roaders" during the Cultural Revolution. After the Cultural Revolution, Deng's policies led to economic reform in China, and a resurgence of capitalism.

=== Collusion with foreigners ===
During the Cultural Revolution, victims who were being accused of collusion with foreigners (里通外国) would often face long jail term, or death penalty.

=== Anti-party and anti-socialism ===
The charge of anti-party and anti-socialism (反党反社会主义) could result in death penalty. The term received media attention in 2010, when Xia Yeliang, a professor of Peking University, was accused of this offence by his students after referring to Taiwan as a country.

=== Reactionaries ===
The accusation of reactionaries (反动份子) often resulted in long jail term and/or death penalty. This accusation was discontinued following the end of the Maoist era.

=== Class enemy ===
The accusation of class enemy (阶级敌人) often resulted in long jail term and/or capital punishment. With the demise of Maoism in China after the rise of Deng Xiaoping, the use of the term "Class enemy" is now extraordinarily rare in China.

== Current ==
=== Inciting subversion of the state ===
Inciting subversion of the state (Chinese: 煽动颠覆国家政权罪) was announced in a 1997 amendment of the Criminal Code of the People's Republic of China. According to Article 105, Paragraph 2,

"Anyone who uses rumor, slander or other means to encourage subversion of the political power of the State or to overthrow the socialist system, shall be sentenced to fixed-term imprisonment of not more than five years. However, the ringleaders and anyone whose crime is monstrous shall be sentenced to fixed-term imprisonment of not less than five years."

The charge of inciting subversion has been leveled against a number of dissidents, Weiquan lawyers, and political reformers. Rights activists, along with international human rights organizations, have argued that article 105 is inconsistent both with China's own constitution and with international human rights standards, particularly in light of the lack of transparency and clear guidelines used in applying the laws. According to the United Nations "Working Group on Arbitrary Detention", the vague and broadly defined wording of the legislation allowed the communication of thoughts and ideas to be regarded as "subversion", even without intentions to commit criminal acts.

==== Accused ====
Among the most prominent Chinese citizens to have been charged with inciting subversion are:

- Gao Zhisheng, sentenced in December 2006 of 3 years of imprisonment, 1 year deprivation of political rights.
- Guo Quan, arrested in Nanjing on 13 November 2008. He was sentenced to 10 years imprisonment in October 2009.
- Hu Jia, sentenced in April 2008 of 3 and half years of imprisonment.
- Huang Qi, was sentenced in February 2003 to 5 years of imprisonment, with 1 year deprivation of political rights. He was sentenced to three years imprisonment in November 2009 for "illegal procession of state secrets"
- Liu Xiaobo, arrested in 2008 due to the publication of Charter 08. He was sentenced to 11 years imprisonment and 2 years deprivation of political rights in December 2009. Liu had three previous convictions beginning in 1989.
- Ruan Xiaohuan, was sentenced in February 2023 to 7 years in prison, with 1 year deprivation of political rights.
- Tan Zuoren, was sentenced to 5 years in prison for "inciting subversion of state power" in February 2010
- Wang Xiaoning, arrested for publishing controversial material online. In September 2003, Wang was convicted of charges of "inciting the overthrow of the state" and sentenced to ten years in prison.
- Yang Chunlin, sentenced in February 2008 to 5 years of imprisonment, with 2 year deprivation of political rights.

=== Inciting separatism and sabotaging national unity ===
Inciting separatism and sabotaging national unity (煽动分裂国家、破坏国家统一) are offences typically used to prosecute members of separatist movements, such as the Tibetan independence movement and East Turkestan independence movement.

==== Accused ====
- The 14th Dalai Lama, Tenzin Gyatso

=== Stealing state secrets ===
Stealing state secrets (窃取国家机密罪) is the crime of stealing state secrets and giving them to foreigners.

- Shi Tao, sentenced in 2005 to 10 years imprisonment, and 2 year deprivation of political rights, on the charge of leaking state secrets to foreigners.
- Song Yongyi, researcher on the Cultural Revolution, was arrested and jailed in December 1999, and was released after the intervention of the US government.

=== Espionage ===
Espionage, or being a foreign spy, carries a long jail term and possible death penalty.

- Ching Cheong, senior journalist with The Straits Times, was imprisoned in April 2005 on allegations that he engaged in espionage by selling state secrets to Taiwan. He was released in February 2008 following outcry from Hong Kong politicians and journalists.
- Rebiya Kadeer, convicted in March 2000 of "leaking state secrets to foreigners" and "endangering state security". She spent 2 years in solitary confinement, and was released in March 2005 .
- Wei Jingsheng, sentenced to 15 years imprisonment in November 1979 for allegedly selling military secrets to a British correspondent. He was again arrested in April 1994 for "Inciting subversion of the state", until his release in November 1997.

== See also ==
- Human rights in China
- Re-education through labor
- Laogai
- Black jails
- Zhen Fan
