= Li Hu =

Li Hu may refer to:

- Li Hu (activist), Chinese HIV/AIDS activist
- Li Hu (general), grandfather of Emperor Gaozu of Tang
- Li Hu (architect)
