= Grace Gao =

Grace Gao may refer to:

- Grace Gao (badminton) (born 1989), Canadian badminton player
- Grace Gao (activist) (born 1993), Chinese human rights activist
- Grace Gao, in the List of Numéro China cover models
