= Tayyeb Tizini =

Syrian philosopher (1934–2019)

- Born: August 10, 1934
- Died: May 18, 2019 (aged 84); Syria
- Years active: 1961–2019

Tayeb Tizini (Arabic: طيب تيزيني; August 10, 1934 – May 18, 2019) was a Syrian philosopher, researcher and academic. born in the city of Homs, a supporter of Marxist nationalist thought. He relies on the historical dialectic in his philosophical project to re-read Arab thought since before Islam until now. He died at the age of 85 after struggle with disease in his city, Homs.

== Life ==
In his 1976 work, Min al-turath ila al-thawra ('From tradition to revolution'), Tizini hoped for a Marxist revolution.

Tizini's 2001 critique of the Damascus Spring, Min thulathiyyat al-fasad ila qadaya al-mujtama' al-madani ('From the trilogy of corruption to issues of civil society'), argued that reform of the state was needed, rather than putting excessive hope in civil society. He nevertheless signed the 2005 Damascus Declaration and the 2006 Beirut-Damascus Declaration. His own 2005 manifesto, Bayan fi al-nahda wa al-tanwir al-arabi ('Statement regarding the Renaissance and the Arab Enlightenment'), called for a new nahda (renaissance) and tanwir ('enlightenment').

After demonstrating to demand the release of political prisoners at the start of the Syrian uprising in March 2011, he was beaten and briefly held by the state security forces. In October 2011 he participated in the national conference convened by the regime in Damascus. He listed five demands as a precondition for national dialogue: no firing at fellow Syrians; release of political prisoners; applying the rule of law; abandoning the security state; and reconstructing the media for a real national debate.

He died in Homs on May 17, 2019.

== During the Syrian revolution ==
Tizini believed that while the Syrian regime was incapable of reform – because this very reform would enact its destruction – it pretends not to see the problem, or thinks that it does not exist. Tizini said in an interview with Syria Today magazine in November 2011 that there is no political option, and that instead only a single fist is used. "[The veins of] this fist will coagulate because it has frozen while grasping society, and it will decay by itself." Tizini said that Syria's internal economy and many institutions were destroyed throughout what he called "quadrant totalitarian law". In this model of state power, there are four pillars: remaining in power, controlling all media, monopolising [the nation's] wealth, and monopolising all referents."

Tizini suggested that reform in Syria now equals the existence of Syria itself. "For the regime it is a 'to be or not to be situation'," he said, adding that "the security state's big motto is 'we must corrupt whoever is not corrupted yet, whereby all become dirty and controllable.' And this is what happened," Tizini continued. "Syria was drained of good manpower and active democratic labour trends in all fields." Tizini concluded that reform starts with holding people accountable for their actions. "When people are held accountable, the mountain will crack and the plain will appear."

== important works ==
=== in German ===
- Introduction to Medieval Arabic Philosophy (German: Die Materieauffassung in der islamischen Philosophie des Mittelalters) 1972 Berlin.

=== In Arabic ===
- 'A project of a new vision for the Arabic thought in the medieval era'(Arabic: مشروع رؤية جديدة للفكر العربي في العصر الوسيط), Damascus house, Damascus, 1971, five prints
- About the problems of culture and revolution in the third world – the Arabic world as an example (Arabic: حول مشكلات الثورة والثقافة في العالم الثالث، الوطن العربي نموذجاً), Damascus house, Damascus, 1971, three prints.
- From heritage to revolution – a proposed theory in Arabic heritage (Arabic: من التراث إلى الثورة حول نظرية مقترحة في قضية التراث العربي), Ibn khaldoun house, Beirut, 1976, three prints.
- Roger Garoudi after silence (Arabic: روجيه غارودي بعد الصمت), Ibn khaldoun house, Beirut, 1973.
- Between philosophy and heritage the author himself, 1980.
- The history of ancient and medieval philosophy (Arabic: تاريخ الفلسفة القديمة والوسيطة), with ghassan finance, Damascus University, 1981.
- Political and social thought: research in modern and contemporary Arabic thought, Damascus University, 1981.
- A project for a new vision of the Arabic thought from its beginnings to contemporary era in 12 parts (Arabic: مشروع رؤية جديدة للفكر الغربي في العصر الوسيط), Damascus house, Damascus, 1982
- Arabic Thought in its beginnings and its early horizons, a project for a new vision of the Arabic thought, part2, Damascus house, Damascus, 1982.
- "From Yahweh to God", a project for a new vision of the Arabic thought, part3 (Arabic: من يهوه إلى الله), Damascus house, Damascus, 1985.
- Studies in the ancient philosophical thought, Damascus University, 1988.
- Ibn Rushd and his philosophy with the text of the dialogue between Muhammad Abduh and Farah Anton, authored by Farah Anton, introduction by Tayyeb Tizini, Dar Alfarabi, Beirut, 1988.
- On the recent intellectual controversy: about some of the issues of the Arabic heritage, a method and application (Arabic: في السجال الفكري الراهن حول بعض قضايا التراث العربي - منهجاً وتطبيقاً), Dar Alfike Aljadid, Beirut, 1989.
- On the Road to Methodological Clarity – writings in philosophy and Arabic thought(Arabic: على طريق الوضوح المنهجي ات في الفلسفة والفكر العربي), Dar Alfarabi, Beirut, 1989.
- Chapters in political Arabic thought, Dar Alfarabi, Beirut, 1989, two prints.
- A preliminary introduction to early Mohammedan Islam – origination and foundation, a project for a new vision of Arabic thought, part 4 (Arabic: مقدمات أولية في الإسلام المحمدي الباكر نشأة وتأسيسا), Damascus house, Damascus, 1994.
- From Western Orientalism to Moroccan Occidentalism – a study in Ajaberi's reading of Arabic thought and its historical horizons (Arabic: من الإستشراق الغربي إلى الإستغراب المغربي بحث في القراءة الجابرية للفكر العربي وفي آفاقها التاريخية), Dar Alzakera, Homs, 1996.
- The Qur'anic Text and the Problematic of its Structure and Reading, a project for a new vision of Arabic thought, part 5 (Arabic: النص القرآني أمام إشكالية البنية والقراءة), Dar Alyanabee, Damascus, 1997.
- From the Trinity of Corruption to the Issue of the Civil Society, Dar Gafra, Damascus, 2002.
- From theology to medieval Arabic philosophy, Ministry of Culture prints (Arabic: من اللاهوت إلى الفلسفة العربية الوسيطة), Syria, 2005.
- A Declaration in Arabic Renaissance and Enlightenment (Arabic: بيان في النهضة والتنوير العربي), Dar Alfarabi, 2005.
