= Tan Zuoren =

Chinese activist

Tan Zuoren 谭作人/譚作人
- Born: May 15, 1954 (age 72); Chengdu, Sichuan, China
- Occupations: human rights activist, writer
- Status: released
- Conviction: Inciting subversion of state power (February 9, 2010)
- Penalty: 5 years in jail and 3 years deprived of political rights
- Comments: Tan Zuoren official blog

Tan Zuoren (born May 15, 1954) is a Chinese environmentalist, writer and former editor of Literati magazine (文化人).

On February 9, 2010, Zuoren was sentenced to 5 years in prison for "inciting subversion of state power." Amnesty International Asia-Pacific Deputy Director said: "His arrest, unfair trial and now the guilty verdict are further disturbing examples of how the Chinese authorities use vague and over broad laws to silence and punish dissenting voices." Due to the nature of the charges and circumstances of the trial, he has been described as a political prisoner.

== 2009 court case ==
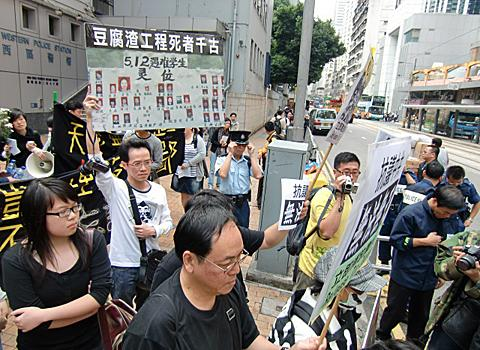
Supporters in Hong Kong protest against China's indictment of Tan Zuoren

After the 2008 Sichuan earthquake Tan came up with a proposal called the "5.12 Student Archive" (5·12学生档案) asking people who lost their children in the quake to set up a victim database. But for his trouble, Chengdu police searched his home and confiscated his DVDs, manuscripts and documents. Tan coined the expression「豆腐渣」(tofu dreg project) to describe the shoddy construction quality of Sichuan schools. On March 28, 2009, he was detained on allegations for subversion of state power. Tan Zuoren was formally accused of defaming the Chinese Communist Party in email comments about the 1989 Tiananmen Square protests and massacre.

According to the indictment,

The indicted Tan Zuoren is dissatisfied with the methods and verdict of the Party Central Committee concerning the "June Fourth Incident" and for many years by various methods has been involved in "June Fourth" activities. On May 27, 2007, Tan Zuoren concocted an article entitled "1989: A Witness to the Last Beauty: An Eyewitness' Tiananmen Square Diary" and using the Internet put it on the website "Torch of Liberty" and other websites outside of China mainland. The main points of that article distorted the handling of the "June Fourth Incident" by the Central Committee of the Chinese Communist Party and libeled it. Shortly after that article was posted, the enemy element outside mainland China Wang Dan contacted him by email and on several occasions sent him propaganda materials about "June Fourth"

On August 12, 2009, his trial in Chengdu, Sichuan province was held. Tan's lawyer Pu Zhiqiang said that "The authorities getting their hands on your witness list and then harassing the witnesses and locking them away, that's a disgrace for the courts in China. But it is the status quo of our judicial system, I think they are doing that because they are afraid."

Tan Zuoren's defense lawyers Xia Lin and Pu Zhiqiang in their defense summation told the court that:

The behavior and speech of Tan Zuoren do not constitute this crime.

As everyone knows, the character of the PRC government is a "people's democratic dictatorship", that is to say the great majority of the people through democratic means hold state power. Overthrowing state power, then, means having the intention to use anti-democratic methods to destroy the system of people's democracy. By looking through all of Tan Zuoren's writings, one can see that he is a person who passionately loves the people, supports democracy, and is opposed to autocracy. Mr. Tan Zuoren is a pioneer of people's democracy and its guardian, not one who would overturn it and destroy it. To convict him of incitement to overturn state power contradicts the basic character of PRC state political regime.

The matters described above are sufficient to prove that none of the accusations of the prosecution about the speech and actions of Tan Zuoren constitute the crime described in Article 151 in the PRC Criminal Code of "incitement to overthrow state power". The accusation that Mr. Tan Zuoren committed this crime fails for lack of evidence.

Sichuan since ancient times has been a place where cultured people gather. Many heroes have arisen throughout the history of Chengdu. We are confident that Sichuan has sufficient political wisdom to handle the Tan Zuoren case. Let us quote here a couplet from the Wuhou Temple of Chengdu for the people involved in this case:

"Those able to win people's hearts are able to eliminate their doubts and their worries; from ancient times people knowledgeable in military affairs have avoided fighting whenever possible; those who are not able to judge situations will make mistakes no matter whether they are strict or lenient. Those who govern Sichuan in the future should deeply reflect upon this."

The defense earnestly requests that the panel of judges reflect deeply and according to Article 162 of the Law of Criminal Procedure of the PRC, and that they find and proclaim the defendant Tan Zuoren not guilty."

Contemporary artist Ai Weiwei, who travelled to Chengdu to testify, said he and 10 other volunteers were woken up by police entering their hotel rooms at 3 am dawn on August 12. He was beaten up and prevented from leaving until after the trial adjourned. Amnesty International said he was detained because he planned to issue an independent report on the collapse of school buildings during the Sichuan earthquake. Ai alleged, "they were like gangs in a movie, they could do whatever they wanted. It was very scary."

Tan's trial began a week after another earthquake activist, Huang Qi, was tried on state secrets charges in Chengdu; he was convicted and sentenced to three years' imprisonment on November 23, 2009. Tan's lawyer, Pu Zhiqiang said the report on the earthquake all show his investigation is objective and scientific.

Hong Kong's now TV aired footage of Chengdu police searching the luggage and hotel rooms of two of its journalists, who were prevented from leaving the hotel for seven hours, while police said they looked for drugs. Footage of security forces manhandling reporters was also shown widely on television news.

== 2010 appeal ==
On June 9, 2010, the Chengdu Intermediate People's Court rejected his appeal. The sentence of 5 years in jail and 3 years deprived of political rights was upheld.

== 2014 release ==
Zuoren was released on March 27, 2014 "under a kind of probation - he doesn't have the right to speak up", according to Ai.

== See also ==
- Hu Jia
- Weiquan movement
- Corruption in China
