= Yang Li (activist) =

Chinese human rights activist

- 杨丽
- Born: 1978 (age 47–48); Changzhou, Jiangsu, China
- Occupation: Land rights activist
- Years active: 2014–present
- Criminal charges: Disrupting the work of stage organs
- Criminal penalty: Imprisonment
- Criminal status: Released

Yang Li (Chinese: 杨丽; pinyin: Yáng Lì; born c. 1978) is a Chinese human rights activist. She is known for her petitioning in support of land rights in Jiangsu, for which she has been persecuted by Chinese authorities, including serving a custodial prison sentence between 2024 and 2025 and being prohibited from accessing medical care.

== Biography ==
=== Activism ===
Yang is from Jintan, a district in the city of Changzhou in Jiangsu.

In 2014, following local authorities' attempts to seize land from Yang and her parents, she began campaigning against land expropriation, forced evictions, demolitions and the subsequent displacement of people in Jiangsu, in addition to the inadequate compensation provided to people impacted by the policies. She became known for her frequent petitions in respect of land rights, petitioning various local authorities including the Jintan Public Security Bureau, the Jintan Procuratorate, and the Jiangsu High People's Court and the National Complaints and Proposals Administration. Yang accused local authorities in Jintan of "misconduct".

As a result of her activism, Yang and her family experienced reprisals from local authorities, including being placed under surveillance, harassment, arbitrary detention, physical assaults and threats. Following her imprisonment, it was reported that prominent leaders within the Jintan Public Security Bureau, the Xicheng subdistrict and Binhu Police Station had stated that once Yang and her parents died, issues around the acquisition of their land would "naturally disappear"; Yang had known renal issues, while her parents both experienced cardiac difficulties.

=== Arrest and imprisonment ===
In 2024, Yang and her father, Xu Dongqing, were arrested in relation to their "persistent petitioning", charged with "disrupting the work order of state organs". Yang was sentenced to one year and three months imprisonment, while her father was sentenced to 13 months in prison.

Yang served her sentence at Changzhou Detention Centre; during her detention, she went on hunger strike to protest what she considered to be her illegal sentence, in addition to "food abuse" after reportedly being given food that prison authorities knew she could not eat due to her renal issues. By August 2025, Yang had developed renal anaemia and severe edema in her legs and feet; the prison did not inform her family, though did request she receive medical attention, including dialysis; such requests were allegedly vetoed by Li Yaoguang, the secretary of the Jiangsu Provincial Political and Legal Committee.

Yang was released from prison on 30 December 2025; the Human Rights Campaign in China reported that she had been diagnosed with end-stage renal disease, with Yang's sister, Yang Caiying, stating her illness had significantly worsened during her imprisonment.

=== Subsequent harassment ===
After her release from prison, Yang was initially detained in custody at a local police station where her mobile phone was confiscated before returning home. On 9 January 2026, Yang attempted to dismantle a police surveillance shack built to monitor her family using farm tools; she was able to successfully retrieve her phone and arrange to receive medical care in Beijing.

On 11 January, Yang and her father travelled to Beijing for a medical appointment; it was also reported that they went to Yuquanshan in an attempt to meet with Xi Jinping to request his support in accessing medical care for both Yang and Xu. They were detained before they were able to do so; an ambulance was called due to Yang's deteriorating physical condition, but she was ultimately transported to a police station in Sijiqing before being transported back to Jiangsu, where she and her father were released on 13 January. The two were charged with "picking quarrels and provoking trouble" and prohibited from leaving Jintan; they were allegedly dropped off by officers miles from their home despite Yang being immobile due to edema.

On 18 January 2026, Yang was prevented from travelling to Peking University First Hospital in Beijing by plainclothes police officers, and was detained at Jintan Law Enforcement Case Management Centre with her father for ten hours before being released after having their mobile phones seized.

=== Response ===
Front Line Defenders expressed its concern about continued restrictions to Yang's freedom of movement and access to medical care following her release from prison, and called on Chinese authorities to ensure her "full and unhindered" access to urgent medical treatment.

Civil Rights and Livelihood Watch attributed the ongoing harassment of Yang and her family on Li Yaoguang, the secretary of the Jiangsu Provincial Political and Legal Committee.

Ahead of the Two Sessions meetings in Beijing in March 2026, Amnesty International called on Chinese authorities to stop blocking Yang's access to medical treatment.
