= Zhou Decai =

Chinese civil rights activist

Zhou Decai (Chinese: 周德才; pinyin: Zhōu Décái) is a civil rights and democracy activist from Gushi county in Henan province, China. Zhou was a farmer-turned-businessman who became active in advocating for civil rights. As a young activist, Zhou attempted to mobilize a number of protests in his hometown against excessive taxes being levied on the citizenry. After several unsuccessful attempts to galvanize protests, he moved to the southern Guangdong province as a migrant worker, but continued writing political essays on calling for multiparty democracy. In 2002, he attempted to organize a pro-democracy demonstration on Tiananmen Square.

In 2011, Zhou attempted to run as an independent political candidate in the local People's Congress election. Although China's constitution protects the rights of any citizens over the age of 18 to vote and run for local election, in practice these positions are generally filled by Communist Party-appointed candidates. Individuals who attempt to run as independents or self-nominated candidates sometimes face repercussions, including jail terms. Chinese authorities have declared that there is "no such thing" as independent political candidates. Nonetheless, Zhou is one of a growing number of grassroots rights activists who have run in local elections as independent candidates.

On 28 February 2012, authorities in Henan province detained Zhou and formally arrested him on charges of "gathering a crowd to disrupt social order" on 10 March. The Congressional-Executive Commission on China describes him as a political prisoner. Prior to his detention Zhou was preparing to travel to Beijing to attend a seminar on labor rights. While in custody at the Gushi county detention center, Zhou staged a hunger strike. He stood trial during a closed hearing in June, and on 3 September 2012, was sentenced to five years in prison by the Gushi county People's Court. His wife, Liu Baoqin, was reportedly barred from attending the trial, and says she was later beaten by unidentified men. Liu told Radio Free Asia that she believed the sentence was retaliation for her husband's advocacy on behalf of farmers whose land had been requisitioned to make room for development projects.

== See also ==
- Rightful resistance
- Li Chengpeng
