= Barefoot lawyer =

Self-taught legal activists in China

A barefoot lawyer (simplified Chinese: 赤脚律师; traditional Chinese: 赤腳律師; pinyin: chìjiǎo lǜshī) is a self-taught legal activist in the People's Republic of China. Many barefoot lawyers are peasants who have taught themselves enough law to file civil complaints, engage in litigation, and educate fellow citizens about their rights. The term is a variation of the "barefoot doctor"—farmers with minimal formal training who nonetheless provided essential medical services in rural China during the Mao era. Barefoot lawyers provide free legal services, and in many instances take on controversial or politically sensitive cases—such as tackling corruption by local authorities—that more established legal professionals may be reluctant to pursue. Notable examples of barefoot lawyers include the blind self-taught activist Chen Guangcheng and Guo Feixiong.

== Background ==
Since the legal reforms of the late 1970s and 1980s, the Chinese Communist Party has moved to embrace the language of the rule of law and establish a modern court system. In the process, it has enacted thousands of new laws and regulations, and embarked on campaigns to publicize the idea that citizens have protection under the law. As China's leadership recognized the importance of the legal system and legal profession in advancing economic development, training for lawyers dramatically increased. From 1986 to 1992, the number of lawyers in the country more than doubled from 21,500 to 45,000, and by 2008 had reached 143,000.

Despite the meteoric growth in China's legal profession since the 1980s, many rural counties still face a severe shortage of legal professionals; a 2004 report by China's Ministry of Justice noted that 200 counties did not have a single lawyer. This has given rise to several distinct classes of legal workers and activists with varying qualifications who step in to meet the demand for legal professionals and advisors. While licensed lawyers and the less qualified "legal workers" tend to have established ties to authorities and local courts, barefoot lawyers are independent actors. Moreover, unlike most lawyers who gravitate to urban centers, barefoot lawyers tend to be based in rural areas where citizens have limited access to justice. Although they lack the training and professionalism of lawyers, they serve an irreplaceable function of providing "convenient, approachable, and free services" without political constraints, according to You-Tien Hsing and Ching Kwan Lee.

== Training ==
Barefoot lawyers are distinguished from qualified lawyers in that they are often completely self-taught, lack formal training in the legal profession, and are not accredited to practice law. They are also different from "legal workers," who are required only to possess a high school education plus a six-month legal training program. Although they lack legal credentials and formal legal training, barefoot lawyers tend to have a higher level of education and experience than most rural citizens.

The proliferation of barefoot lawyers in China is due, in part, to a provision in Chinese law which allows parties to represent themselves or select their own, unpaid representatives to appear in court on their behalf; the chosen representatives do not need to be licensed lawyers.

== Work ==
Barefoot lawyers are known for taking on controversial or politically sensitive cases, such as illegal land grabs, corruption and abuse of power, or environmental disputes. In many instances, more legitimate legal workers and lawyers are unwilling to accept these cases, as doing so can result in reprisals. Several barefoot lawyers identify closely with the Weiquan (rights defending) movement.

Among the notable cases taken on by Weiquan lawyers is Chen Guangcheng's effort in 2000 to mobilize 79 villages in his native Shandong Province to petition against a paper mill that had been polluting a river, killing wildlife and ruining crops. The effort was successful, and resulted in the suspension of the paper mill. Chen later earned international recognition for initiating a class-action lawsuit against the staff of a family planning clinic in Shandong province that allegedly forced thousands of people to undergo sterilization or to abort pregnancies. Another case, publicized in Newsweek, involved barefoot lawyers petitioning authorities to provide compensation to villagers who had been beaten by authorities over a tax dispute.

In addition to litigating cases in court, barefoot lawyers perform a number of other services, such as organizing citizens to petition authorities. A survey in rural Henan province found that, between 2001 and 2004, more cases were handled by barefoot lawyers than by licensed lawyers. Across China, barefoot lawyers and "legal workers" provide more legal services and draft more legal documents than licensed lawyers, and in some areas litigate more civil cases than lawyers.

== Reception ==
Scholars of Chinese law and society have described barefoot lawyers as providing legal services and advice that are largely irreplaceable by lawyers and legal workers; in particular, they provide free access to justice in rural areas, and take on administrative cases and politically sensitive cases that many other legal professionals are unwilling to pursue. However, barefoot lawyers have attracted some scorn from licensed lawyers. Urban areas often experience a surplus of licensed lawyers, and many have lobbied to impose more restrictions on the activities of legal workers and barefoot lawyers to reduce market competition. Although alternative legal service providers such as legal workers and barefoot lawyers were at one time encouraged in rural areas to satisfy unmet demand, in recent years they have come under increased control and scrutiny by authorities.

Due to the nature of cases barefoot lawyers sometimes take on—which include challenging official corruption, organizing against abuses of power, or defending victims of forced eviction—they are sometimes met with punitive reprisals by authorities. The barefoot lawyer Guo Feixiong was sentenced to five years in prison in 2007 in what was characterized as a "trial marked with serious procedural irregularities." Family members reported that Guo was tortured in custody, deprived of sleep, and shocked with electric batons. Chen Guangcheng was sentenced to over four years in prison after he sought to defend victims of forced sterilization and abortion; following his release, he remained under house arrest.

== See also ==
- Law of the People's Republic of China
- List of Chinese pro-democracy activists
- Weiquan movement
- Chen Guangcheng
