= Liu Xinjuan =

Chinese activist

Liu Xinjuan is a Chinese land reform activist from Shanghai.

She has been forcibly committed to psychiatric hospitals five times in three years because of her efforts to fight illegal land-seizures and forced evictions in Shanghai. She was first committed in 2003 under the charge that she was suffering from "litigation mania". She was reportedly "subjected to brutal and degrading abuse" during that confinement.

Liu was arrested in the Jing'an District Park in Shanghai on January 16, 2006, while she was preparing to take part in a march on the Sino-Russian Friendship Building to deliver a people's petition to state authorities meeting there. After her arrest, she was taken to the Qibao Township Dispatch Station. Later that night, she was bound and gagged and transported to Minhang District Beiqiao Psychiatric Hospital. Liu's son, Feng Liangxi visited his mother at the hospital and reported visible injuries to her body, face, and left hand.

According to a 1 August 2006 update from Human Rights in China, Liu recently escaped from a psychiatric hospital after being imprisoned there for 20 days. According to Liu, her son Feng Liangxi was detained at the hospital when he went to pick up her possessions. She says he was kept there from late June until July 14.
