= Guo Feixiong =

Chinese human rights lawyer and dissident

Guo Feixiong 郭飞雄
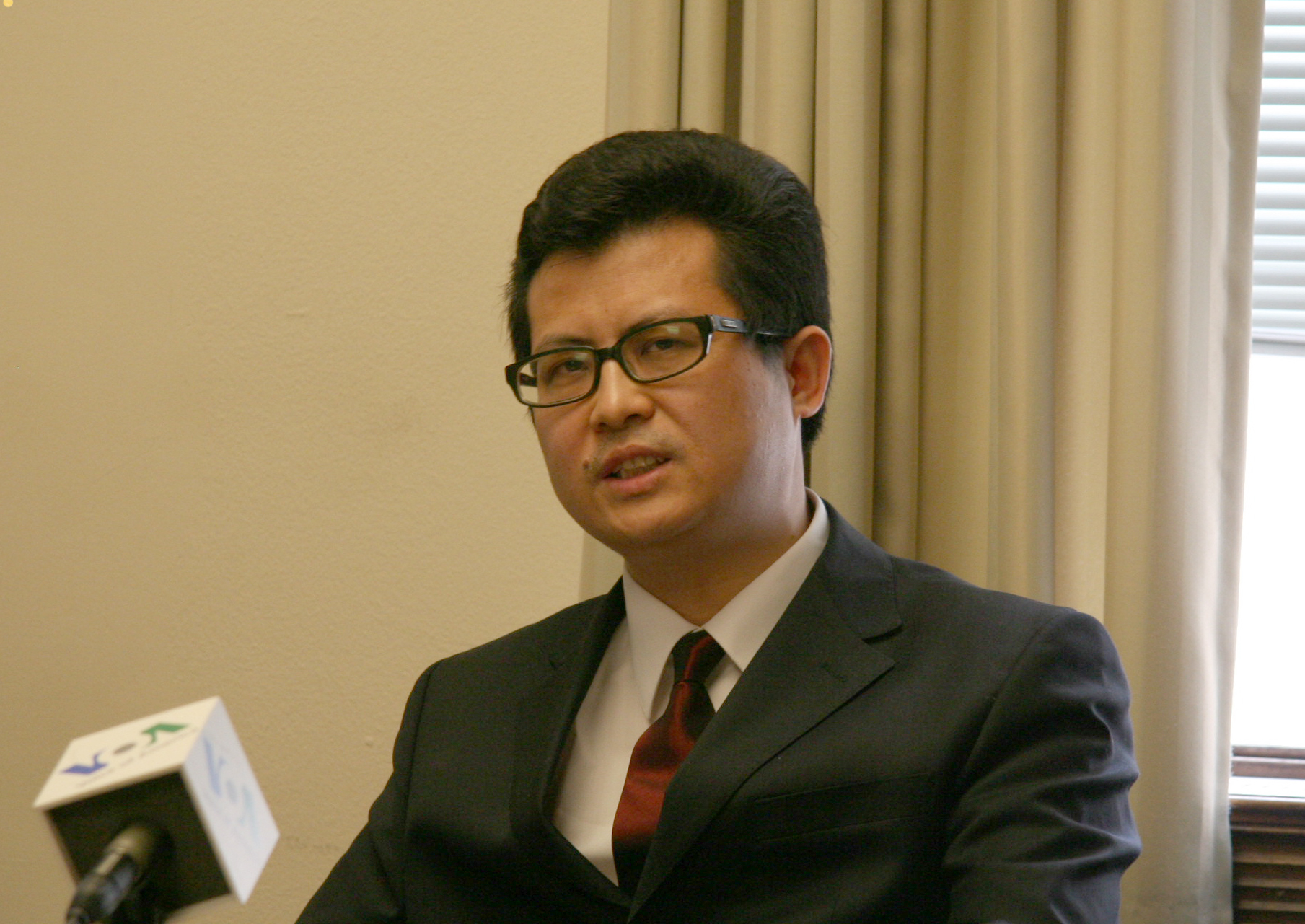
- Born: 2 August 1966 (age 60); Gucheng County, Hebei, China
- Occupations: lawyer, human rights activist
- Spouse: Zhang Qing
- Children: 2

Guo Feixiong (simplified Chinese: 郭飞雄; traditional Chinese: 郭飛雄; pinyin: Guō Fēixióng; born 2 August 1966) is the pen name of Yang Maodong (杨茂东/楊茂東), a Chinese human rights legal activist from Guangdong province who is often identified with the Weiquan movement. Guo is known as a dissident writer and "barefoot lawyer", who has worked on several controversial issues to defend the rights of marginalized groups. Prior to his 2006 imprisonment, Guo worked as a legal advisor to the Shanghai Shengzhi Law Firm.

== Early life ==
Guo was born on 1966 in Gucheng County, Hebei. During the Cultural Revolution, he was sent to the countryside with his parents for nine years, where they experienced poverty. In July 1988, he graduated from the Department of Philosophy of East China Normal University in Shanghai, and was assigned to work at Wuhan Medical College for Staff and Workers, where he served as a philosophy teacher. Guo actively participated in the 1989 Tiananmen Square Protests. In 1991 he went to Guangdong, where he was engaged in various occupations. From 1993 to 2001, he mainly engaged in private publishing, and then made a living by writing.

== Legal career ==
In 2005 and 2006, human rights groups reported that Guo was taken into custody and beaten on multiple occasions for his human rights advocacy, including his work on the Taishi village standoff. The beating of Guo Feixiong was reportedly one of the catalysts behind a rolling nationwide hunger strike organized by Guo's friend and associate Gao Zhisheng.

Guo was arrested on 30 September 2006 and detained on charges of "illegal business activity" connection with the publication of a book on a political scandal in Liaoning province, Shenyang Political Earthquake. After being held in pre-trial detention for 17 months, he was sentenced to five years of imprisonment at the Meizhou Prison on 14 November 2007 in what was characterized as a "trial marked with serious procedural irregularities." In addition to his sentence, Guo was fined 40,000 yuan. Family members reported that Guo was tortured in custody, deprived of sleep, and shocked with electric batons.

Guo was released on 13 September 2011, and stated that he remained committed to the cause of human rights advocacy.

On 8 August 2013, Guo was again arrested on suspicion of "gathering a crowd to disrupt order in a public place". On 10 December 2013, the Tianhe District Branch of the Guangzhou Municipal Public Security Bureau recommended that Guo be indicted for the crime of "gathering a crowd to disrupt order in a public place", along with Sun Desheng, another activist.

On 29 October 2013, the United States House Foreign Affairs Subcommittee on Africa, Global Health, Global Human Rights and International Organizations held a hearing on the circumstances surrounding China's detention of Guo Feixiong.

Guo is the recipient of the 2015 Front Line Defenders Award for Human Rights Defenders at Risk.

On 28 January 2021, Guo was arrested by the border inspection on the grounds of 'endangering national security' at Shanghai Pudong International Airport, when he was about to board a flight to the United States to visit his cancer-stricken wife.

Guo was again detained in December 2021 and formally arrested on the charge of "subversion to state power" on 12 January 2022, two days after the death of his wife, Zhang Qing, in the United States. He had repeatedly pleaded with authorities to be allowed to visit her and his children after she had been diagnosed in January 2021 with terminal illness.

Following the death of Zhang in January 2022, U.S. Department of State spokesperson Ned Price issued a statement where he requested that the Chinese authorities must grant Guo humanitarian relief and allow his travel to the United States to be reunited with his children and grieve the passing of his wife.

On 11 May 2023, Guo was found guilty of inciting subversion of state power to a prison term of eight years. Diplomats from several countries, including the U.S. embassy, said they were prevented from attending the trial. The U.S. embassy in China said that they “continue to call for Mr. Guo's speedy release so he may be reunited with his family."

== Personal life ==
Guo was married to Zhang Qing, with whom he had two children; a son and a daughter. Zhang and children fled their Guangzhou home in January 2009 and fled to the United States from Thailand, where they were granted political asylum in November that year. From the US, Zhang continued to advocate for the freedom of her husband. In January 2021, Zhang was diagnosed with late-stage colon cancer. As a result, Guo sent an open letter where he requested to be allowed to leave China and reunite with her, which was rejected by the authorities. He was arrested in January 2021 at Shanghai airport as he tried to visit his dying wife. Zhang died on 10 January 2022, at the age of 55.

== See also ==
- Weiquan movement
