= Li Chengpeng =

Chinese writer

Li Chengpeng 李承鹏
- Born: September 22, 1968 (age 57); Hami, Xinjiang
- Occupation: Author
- Known for: Democracy activist, journalist

Li Chengpeng (Chinese: 李承鹏; pinyin: Lǐ Chéngpéng) (born September 22, 1968) is a prominent writer and social critic in the People's Republic of China. Well known in China for his reportage and social commentary—Li's Sina Weibo blog had nearly six million followers — (it is offline now) Li made international headlines in 2011 when he announced that he would seek political office as an independent candidate in his hometown of Chengdu, Sichuan province. While not technically illegal, the decision represented a rare and bold move in a country where candidates for political office are appointed by the Chinese Communist Party.

== Career ==
Li, nicknamed "Li Da Yan" ("big-eyed Li"), began his career as a journalist and first rose to prominence for covering on corruption within China's professional soccer establishment. Li later coauthored a book on the subject, Chinese Soccer: The Inside Story, which documented allegations of pervasive match-fixing involving coaches, players, referees and officials. The book asserted that nearly every professional Chinese soccer player had faced varying degrees of pressure or coercion by gambling syndicates to participate in fixing games. He says his coverage of the issue prompted persistent and anonymous threats against him and his family.

His profile grew in the aftermath of the 2008 Sichuan earthquake. Having experienced the tremors in his apartment in Chengdu, Li committed himself to assisting in rescue efforts in the areas most severely impacted. He traveled to the Sichuan earthquake region as a volunteer and wrote an essay: "The True Story of the Miracle Survival of the Students and Teachers of Longhan Elementary School in Beichuan". He also published a novel titled, Li Kele Protests Demolitions in 2011, which took a critical look at forced demolitions in China.

In 2011, Li announced he would be running as an independent candidate to serve in the People's Congress of Wuhou district, Chengdu. Although China's constitution protects the rights of any citizens over the age of 18 to vote and run for local election, in practice these positions are generally filled by Chinese Communist Party-appointed candidates. Individuals who attempt to run as independents or self-nominated candidates sometimes face repercussions. A number of prominent cultural figures, writers, and academics endorsed Li's candidacy including blogger Han Han, film director Feng Xiaogang, and legal scholar Yu Jianrong and He Weifang.

== See also ==
- Zhou Decai
