= Gong Pixiang =

Gong Pixiang (Chinese character: 公丕祥; Pinyin: Gōng Pĭxiáng; born 1955) is a jurist in China. He was the President of Nanjing Normal University and is the President of the High People's Court of Jiangsu Province.

== Biography ==
Gong Pixiang was born in Siyang, Jiangsu in 1955. He graduated from Nanjing Normal University in 1982. After graduation, he joined the faculty of this university. Gong Pixiang was selected as one of the "Ten Outstanding Young Jourists" by China Law Society in 1995. He received his LL.D degree from Renmin University of China Law School in 1997. He has written about human rights.

Gong Pixiang was the President of Nanjing Normal University from 1996 to 2002. He was elected as the President of the High People's Court of Jiangsu Province in 2003.

Academic offices
Preceded by	President of the Nanjing Normal University; 1996 – 2002	Succeeded by
Legal offices
Preceded by	President of Jiangsu High People's Court; 2003 –	Succeeded by
