= He Zhihua =

He Zhihua (1963 – 2012) (traditional Chinese: 何志華; simplified Chinese: 何志华) was a resident of Lianhua Village, Yuelu District, Changsha City in Hunan Province, People's Republic of China. On 16 September 2012, when protesting against the construction of a local road that caused serious damage to his home, He Zhihua was deliberately crushed to death by a steamroller under the order of the local Chinese Communist Party official Ling Yun (凌云).

== Activism ==
Since 2009, the construction of a local highway near He Zhihua's home caused water damage to the building, and He Zhihua's continuous petition brought him harassment and threat from the local authority.

On 16 September 2012, when again confronting the local official at the road construction site, He Zhihua was slapped on the face by the town councilor Ling Yun. In a rage, He Zhihua laid down on the road and shouted, "Crush me if you wish." And it was alleged by eyewitness that the town councilor replied, "So what, this road cannot be built without a few deaths."

== Death and aftermath ==
Under the implied authorization of the town councilor, the steamroller crushed over the body of He Zhihua who was killed on the spot. Shocked by his daylight murder, He Zhihua's families and neighbors totaling fifty to sixty people preserved the crime scene including He Zhihua's remains late into the night. At about 4am the following day, around six hundred police and party officials led by the Yuelu District Party Secretary Wen Zhilong (文志龙) arrived at the scene with handcuffs, and took away the remains from He Zhihua's family by force. In the process, He Zhihua's older brother and uncle were seriously injured and another twenty villagers were beaten and received various degrees of injury. The family was then coerced into agreeing the remains being cremated.

== See also ==
- Weiquan movement
- Rachel Corrie
