= Tofu-dreg project =

Chinese phrase for a poorly constructed building

- Chinese: 豆腐渣工程
Transcriptions
Standard Mandarin
- Hanyu Pinyin: dòufu zhā gōngchéng
- Gwoyeu Romatzyh: dowfu ja gongcherng
- Wade–Giles: tou^{4}-fu cha^{1} kung^{1}-ch'eng^{2}
- IPA: [tôʊfu ʈʂá kʊ́ŋʈʂʰə̌ŋ]
Yue: Cantonese
- Yale Romanization: dauh-fuh jā gūng-chìhng
- Jyutping: dau6 fu6 zaa1 gung1 cing4
- IPA: [tɐw˨ fu˨ tsa˥ kʊŋ˥ tsʰɪŋ˩]

"Tofu-dreg project" or "tofu buildings" (Chinese: 豆腐渣工程) is a Chinese phrase used to describe poorly constructed buildings or infrastructure, often due to time constraints or corruption. In the event of a failure or collapse, online discussion and media coverage is frequently censored.

Recent uses of the term include buildings which collapsed after the 2008 Sichuan earthquake, and the Bangkok Audit Office skyscraper which collapsed initiated by aftershocks from the March 2025 Myanmar earthquake over 1000 km away, which was constructed with poor construction techniques and materials. In July and August 2024, over 100 people were killed in collapses of roads and bridges, which has been attributed to tofu-dreg construction of such infrastructure.

== Origins and definition ==
The phrase was coined by Zhu Rongji, the former premier of the People's Republic of China, on a 1998 visit to Jiujiang City, Jiangxi Province to describe poorly built levees in the Yangtze River.

In China, the term tofu dregs (the pieces left over after making tofu) is widely used as a metaphor for shoddy work, hence the implication that a "tofu-dreg project" is a poorly executed project. Chinese architect Li Hu has asserted that tofu-dreg projects are vastly outnumbered by buildings constructed without significant flaws, indicating that such substandard construction is a minority issue rather than the norm in China. He notes that while these projects often suffer from reduced lifespans or minor issues like leakages, the risk of them resulting in total collapse is often overstated by external observers.

In the aftermath of the 2008 Sichuan earthquake, Geoffrey York of The Globe and Mail reported on 15 May 2008, that a steelworker in the region told him that poorly constructed buildings, known as "tofu buildings", resulted from the corrupt use of low-grade materials that failed to meet regulatory standards. The worker alleged that planners had replaced steel rods with thin iron wires for reinforcing concrete, used bad cement, and used fewer bricks than required. He also alleged that supervising agencies failed to check whether construction complied with national regulations.

== Explanation ==
There are several reasons why tofu-dreg buildings are created. Corruption and political ties certainly plays a role. For example, between January and August 2011, over 6,800 officials had been prosecuted due to corruption of infrastructure projects, according to the Communist Party's Central Commission for Discipline Inspection. Local governments also rely on the revenue brought by construction projects, so quick growth is encouraged.

Another problem are the so called "tribute projects", buildings that are rushed to be complete in time for celebratory dates such as State anniversaries, so that local officials can ingratiate themselves with their superiors. Among notable examples, In 2011, a bridge in Jiaozhou Bay was rushed to be completed in time for the 90th Anniversary of the Chinese Communist Party, and was recorded by China Central Television missing parts such as unsecured bolts; in 2007, the Fengda Bridge in Fenghuang County, built in time for the 50th anniversary of the founding of Xiangxi Prefecture, fell, killing 64 people and injuring 22.

== Examples ==
=== 2008 Sichuan earthquake ===
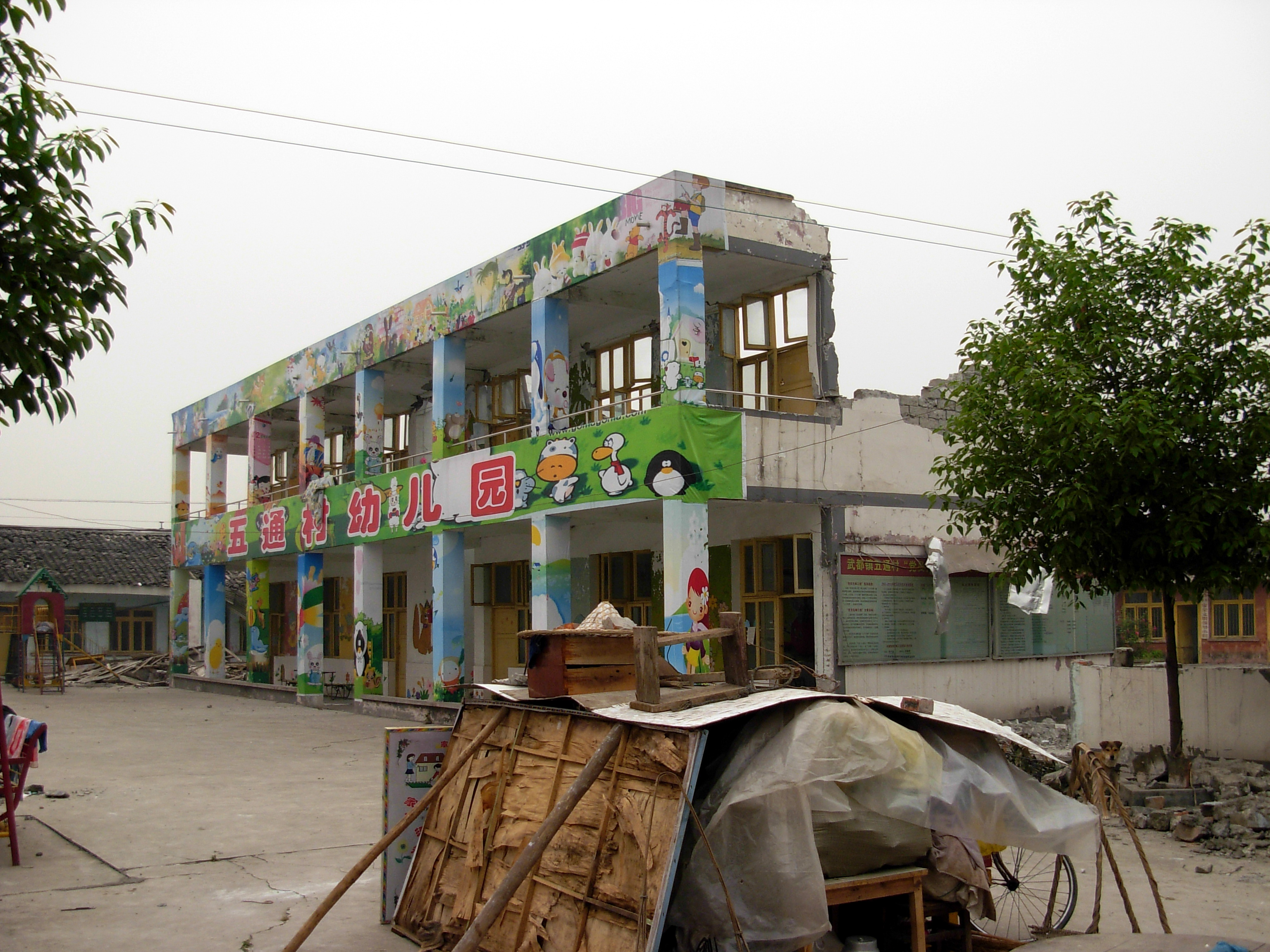
This kindergarten was among the many schools in the disaster region that suffered heavy structural damage.

During the 2008 Sichuan earthquake, many schoolhouses collapsed; resulting in the death of students. These buildings have been used to exemplify tofu-dreg projects. The collapses were linked to allegations of corruption in the construction of Chinese schools.

…School construction is the worst. First, there's not enough capital. Schools in poor areas have small budgets and, unlike schools in the cities, they can't collect huge fees, so they're pressed for money. With construction, add in exploitation by government officials, education officials, school managers, etc. and you can imagine what's left over for the actual building of schools. When earthquake prevention standards are raised, government departments, major businesses, etc. will all appraise and reinforce their buildings. But these schools with their 70s-era buildings, no one pays attention to them. Because of this, the older school buildings are suffer[ing] from inadequate protection while the new buildings have been shoddily constructed.

— A construction engineer using the pseudonym "Book Blade" (书剑子)

The state-controlled media has largely ignored the tofu-dregs schoolhouses, under directives from the propaganda bureau's instructions. Parents, volunteers, and journalists who have questioned authorities have been intimidated or arrested. To quash the issue, riot police officers have broken up protests by parents, cordons have been set up around the schools in question, and reportage simply stopped.

=== Taizhou Dam incident ===
An emblematic example of a tofu-dreg project happened in Taizhou, Jiangsu, where an accident where a car hit a concrete parapet of a dam on the Nanguan river, a tributary of the Yangtse, revealed that the supposed steel reinforcements of the concrete instead was filled with weed stems.
