= Zheng Enchong =

Chinese Weiquan lawyer

Zheng Enchong 郑恩宠
- Born: 2 September 1950 (age 75)
- Occupation: Attorney
- Known for: Human Rights advocacy
- Spouse: Jiang Meili

Zheng Enchong
- Chinese: 郑恩宠
- Traditional Chinese: 鄭恩寵
Transcriptions
Standard Mandarin
- Hanyu Pinyin: Zhèng Ēnchǒng

Zheng Enchong (born 2 September 1950) is a Shanghai-based Weiquan (rights defending) lawyer. Zheng was sentenced in 2003 to three years in prison for his advocacy on behalf of citizens who had been forcibly evicted from their homes. The charge stemmed from two faxes Zheng was alleged to have sent to the New York-based organisation Human Rights in China concerning workers' protests. Upon his release from prison, he remained under house arrest.

His lawyer Guo Guoting was allegedly forbidden to see him. Guo Guoting now lives in Canada.

Zheng Enchong had advised more than 500 families displaced by Shanghai's urban redevelopment projects on their rights to fair compensation. In 2005, he received the Human Rights Award of the German Association of Judges.

== Biography ==
During the Cultural Revolution, he was exiled to the countryside for 11 years before returning to a variety of factory and government jobs. He began to study law in 1985 and passed the lawyer's exam two years later. In 1994, Zheng started representing clients who claimed they had been illegally evicted and who received little or no compensation from the authorities. In 2001, the Shanghai Judicial Bureau refused to renew his lawyer's licence and he was detained in June 2003, days after a group of evicted residents he had advised appeared in court attempting to sue the authorities for adequate compensation, alleging collusion between officials and a wealthy property developer.

Zheng Enchong was later charged and sentenced to three years in prison for "supplying state secrets to foreign entities" in connection with faxes he sent to Human Rights in China, an NGO based in New York. There are serious concerns that Zheng Enchong's detention and conviction were aimed at preventing him from continuing with his advocacy work. A lasting effect of his conviction has been a reported decrease in the number of lawyers in Shanghai willing to "risk" defending people's rights to housing for fear of reprisals.

On December 8, 2005, the German Judges Association presented Zheng Enchong with its "Human Rights Award" at a reception attended by the German president. Jiang Meili was invited to receive the award on Zheng's behalf, but his wife Jiang Meili was restricted from leaving China. Therefore, a petitioner of Hong Kong accepted the award on his behalf.

Zheng Enchong was released on June 5, 2006, but remained under house arrest.
