= Transcending Fear =

Transcending Fear: The Story of Gao Zhisheng
- Directed by: Wenjing Ma
- Release date: 2013

Transcending Fear: The Story of Gao Zhisheng is a 2013 biography documentary film covering the life of Chinese human rights lawyer Gao Zhisheng. The film was directed by Wenjing Ma.
