= German Association of Judges =

The German Association of Judges (German: Deutscher Richterbund, DRB) is the largest professional organization of judges and public prosecutors in Germany. It was founded in 1909. It is a member organization of the International Association of Judges.

Every other year, the DRB honors a judge, public prosecutor or other lawyer with a Human Rights Award for outstanding merits on the defence of human rights. Recent laureates were Syrian lawyer Anwar al-Bunni, Iranian attorney Nasser Zarafshan in 2007 and the Chinese lawyer Zheng Enchong in 2005.
