= Anwar al-Bunni =

Syrian human rights lawyer

Anwar al-Bunni أنور البني
- Born: 1959 (age 66–67); Hama, Syria
- Occupation: Lawyer
- Known for: Democracy activist, political prisoner
- Awards: Front Line Award for Human Rights Defenders at Risk (2008); German Association of Judges Human Rights Award (2009)

Anwar al-Bunni (Arabic: أنور البني, born 1959) is a Syrian human rights lawyer who has defended clients such as Riad al-Turk, Riad Seif, the owner of The Lamplighter, (an independent newspaper shut down by the Syrian government), Kurdish protesters, and "dozens of others."

Al-Bunni was born in Hama to a Christian family active in dissident leftist politics. According to an interview with American journalist Robin Wright, he became interested in defending dissidents after being beaten, bayonetted, and having his beard set on fire by Syrian soldiers during a military sweep of Hama in 1981. Wright describes him as having spent "most of his life" defending Syria's political dissidents, often pro bono, and having sold his automobile and office to pay his bills as a result. He was head of the short-lived European Union-funded human rights training centre in Syria called the Center for Legal Research and Studies until it was shut down by the government following his 2006 arrest.

Al-Bunni defended Damascus Spring activist Aref Dalila at his 2002 trial. After presenting a blood-stained handkerchief as evidence that Dalila had been beaten at the prison, he was ordered from the court by a judge and banned from practicing before the Supreme State Security Court.

== 2006–2011 imprisonment ==
In May 2006 he was detained by security forces after signing the Beirut-Damascus Declaration calling for democratic reform. A year later he was given a five-year sentence for "spreading false or exaggerated news that could weaken national morale, affiliating with an unlicensed political association with an international nature, discrediting state institutions and contacting a foreign country", according to his lawyer. He was also fined the equivalent of US$2,000 for operating the Center for Legal Research and Studies without government permission. Analysts described the sentence as more severe than those previously given for similar offenses, making it a "stark warning to the Syrian opposition".

Amnesty International designated him a prisoner of conscience, and U.S. President George W. Bush named al-Bunni in a speech as a political prisoner unfairly jailed by Syria.

After his release from prison in 2011, he continued to defend detainees.

== 2012–present: exile in Germany ==
Al-Bunni escaped from Syria in 2012, shortly after the Houla massacre, and later sought political asylum in Germany.

In Germany, al-Bunni participated in the universal jurisdiction war crimes trial of Anwar Raslan and Eyad al-Gharib. In June 2020, he provided testimony as a witness on "the horrors and the bureaucratic structures of Assad's jails and torture chambers", based on his five years as a prisoner in Syria and from his legal experience in representing victims. Al-Bunni worked with prosecutors to help find witnesses willing to testify in the trial.

Al-Bunni is more broadly interested in promoting transitional justice.

== Awards ==
In 2008, al-Bunni received the Front Line Award for Human Rights Defenders at Risk. The following year he was awarded the Human Rights Award by the German Association of Judges., in 2018 he received the Franco-German Prize for 'Human Rights and the Rule of Law'.

Anwar features in Time Magazine's "The 100 Most Influential People of 2022".
