= Yuan Xianchen =

Yuan Xianchen 袁显臣
- Born: 2 November 1964 (age 61); Jixi, Heilongjiang, China
- Occupations: lawyer, human rights activist

Yuan Xianchen (simplified Chinese: 袁显臣; traditional Chinese: 袁顯臣; pinyin: Yuán Xiǎnchén) is a mainland Chinese lawyer and human rights activist from Heilongjiang province. On March 4, 2009, he was found guilty of "inciting subversion of state power" and sentenced to four years imprisonment and five years' deprivation of political rights. The verdict is currently being appealed, since Yuan claims evidence used against him in court was extracted by means of torture.

== Background ==
Yuan, 44, self-studied law and is best known for his work as a legal advisor to workers at the Didao Mine in Jixi City. The miners have been seeking compensation from the local government and the mine management since the former state-owned business was re-structured and became a private enterprise.

Yuan's legal aid work in Jixi City since 1998 on behalf of farmers, miners, displaced persons, and other impoverished or exploited citizens earned him the ire of local government officials.

== Detention ==
Yuan was taken into police custody in Jixi, Heilongjiang on May 24, 2008. Yuan was formally detained on May 29 and arrested on suspicion of "subversion of state power" on June 30. His wife, Zhang, was detained at the same time on charges of "disturbing social order," and was later released on bail on July 2, 2008. Yuan was formally arrested on June 30, 2008, and remained in police custody until his trial.

== Trial and Imprisonment ==
Yuan was tried by the Jixi City Intermediate People's Court on January 12, 2009. On March 4 was found guilty of "inciting subversion of state power", and sentenced to four years in prison and five years' deprivation of political rights. The verdict is being appealed. The charge against Yuan hinged on four main accusations: first, that he distributed an article entitled "Save China, Implement Constitutional Democracy" to petitioners and representatives attending the National People's Congress in Beijing in 2005; second, that he gave interviews to the Epoch Times and other foreign media; third, that he received funds from domestic and overseas organizations; and finally, that he drafted over twenty articles "attacking" socialism. These actions provided the "evidence" necessary for authorities to punish Yuan.

Although it was not formally mentioned at the trial, it is believed that Yuan was also arrested in part for helping Yang Chunlin (杨春林), a Heilongjiang farmers' representative, collect signatures endorsing an open letter entitled "We Want Human Rights, Not the Olympics". Yang was sentenced to five years in prison for "inciting subversion of state power" on March 24, 2008.

=== Alleged Torture ===
Yuan also told his lawyers that he was beaten and coerced to confession. According to Civil Rights and Livelihood Watch (CRLW), Yuan's lawyers, Li Fangping (李方平) and Li Xiongbing (黎雄兵), attended the trial. According to Chinese Human Rights Defenders (CHRD), between Yuan's apprehension in Beijing on May 24, 2008, and his formal detention on May 29, he was repeatedly tortured to extract confession in Beijing Municipal State Security Bureau Detention Center. Also a guard hit Yuan's head with handcuffs, which left more than ten bald spots and visible scars on his head. During those five days, Yuan was not informed of his suspected crime, the state organ holding him or the location of his detention. When Yuan was later transferred to the Jixi City Detention Center, the beatings continued but were less frequent.

=== No contact with family ===
Yuan's family has been barred from visiting the activist and the letters they sent him have gone unanswered. They only saw him once at his trial on January 12, 2009. Since then they have had no news from him, and letters they sent him have gone unanswered, leaving them unsure whether they were ever delivered. His parents, aged 74 and 73, are both seriously ill with cancer, and have stated that they wish to see their son again in this lifetime.

== Involvement of Human Rights Organisations ==
Several Human Rights organisations have been campaigning for Yuan's immediate release, believing that he has been punished and subjected to mistreatment simply for exercising his freedom of speech, which is guaranteed by Article 35 of the Chinese Constitution. His right to be protected against cruel and inhuman punishment is guaranteed by the Convention against Torture and Other Cruel, Inhuman or Degrading Treatment or Punishment.

== See also ==
- Yang Chunlin
- Human rights in the People's Republic of China
