= Sichuan schools corruption scandal =

Political corruption scandal following the 2008 earthquake in Sichuan, China

The extent of the earthquake

After the May 12, 2008 earthquake in the Chinese province of Sichuan, there were a series of allegations of corruption against officials involved in the construction of schools in regions affected by the quake. It gained momentum in May and June 2008, and the allegations culminated in protests from grieving parents of children who died in the earthquake as a result of the collapse of various schools in the quake zone.

The scandal eventually became a focal point of reporting on the earthquake rescue efforts, with Chinese civil engineers, bloggers, activists, and foreign media bringing attention to the allegations. Various discussions reports alleged that local government officials and construction companies were negligent in the construction of schools, and that they ignored civil engineering standards, saved materials and took shortcuts while pocketing the difference.

Despite initial openness to independent reporting and foreign media, the Chinese government attempted to downplay the issue and suppress criticism. Additionally, local governments attempted to entice grieving parents into monetary compensation in exchange for their silence. While Chinese authorities were initially praised by international media for its rapid and effective response to the earthquake, the school construction scandal severely undermined the initial positive reactions, particularly among Western media. Postings about the scandal flooded Chinese online portals and discussion boards, and popularized the phrase "tofu-dreg schoolhouses" (Chinese: 豆腐渣校舍). The internet activism resulted in a pledge by the central government to conduct investigations into the allegations, but it was ostensibly not followed up with any substantial action.

== Background ==
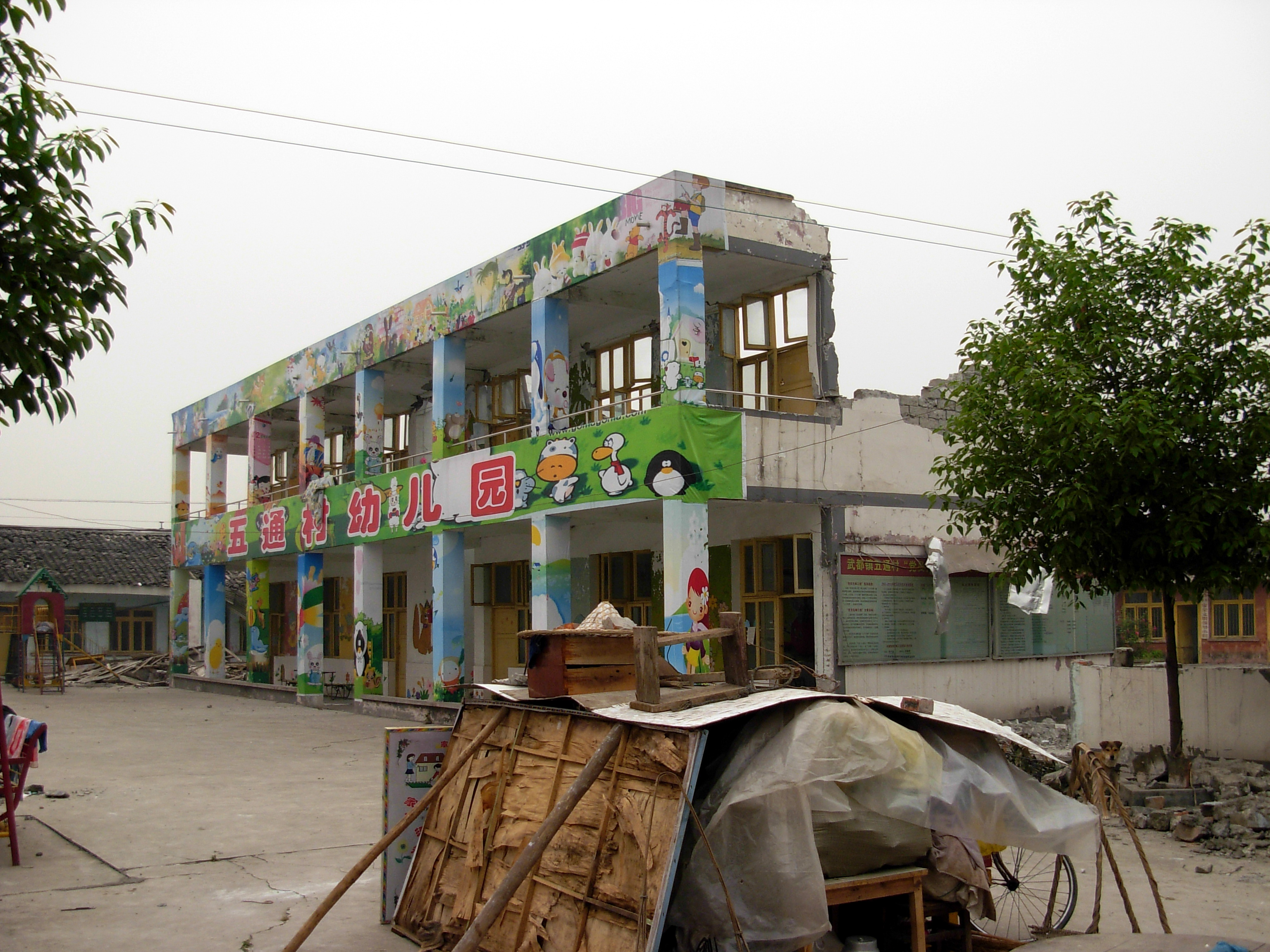
A kindergarten building, partially collapsed by the earthquake

Over 7,000 schoolrooms collapsed in the course of the earthquake, mostly in rural areas, reportedly leading to the death of nearly 5,000 students (though some parents believe the real figure is twice that officially cited) and the injury of over 15,000 students. The total death toll of the quake was around 70,000 people, with some 375,000 injuries. A month after the quake, nearly 20,000 people remained missing, while five million were rendered homeless.

The disproportionate number of school collapses led to open discussions that they were not built to adequate standards. The grieving parents and critical journalists pointed out that "hundreds of schools collapsed instantly – even newly constructed ones – while older buildings nearby were often unscathed." This, in turn, has led to allegations of corruption on the part of Education Ministry officials and contractors who were said to be complicit in constructing the school buildings dangerously below government-mandated standards, while pocketing the remaining surplus. On May 26, Wang Xuming, a spokesman for the Education Ministry, stated that the ministry would complete a reassessment of school buildings in quake zones and that those who had cut corners on school construction would be "severely punished". Some parents protested what they argued, one month after the event, amounts to government inaction.

== Analysis and opinions ==
=== Factors in building collapse ===
The earthquake caused the collapse of more than 6.5 million buildings and damaged some 23 million more. Four factors determine the damage to a particular building, according to geologist Liu Jie (Chinese: 刘杰), Director of Earthquake Prediction Department of (China's) Center for Seismic Monitoring Station Network under the China Earthquake Administration (CEA), who arrived in the quake zone on the same day as the main quake. Besides the quake's magnitude and intensity in the area, the location of the building played an important role. In some towns that Liu surveyed, all buildings sitting on the earthquake fault line collapsed, while buildings tens of meters away did not. Building structure was also a factor. Buildings with larger spans tend to collapse more easily. The fourth factor was the quality of the building. If a building's designed fortification intensity is above the quake's intensity at the location, the collapse of a building can be definitively attributed to its engineering quality, Liu explained. On the other hand, if the quake's intensity exceeds the designated code, it would be hard to determine whether the earthquake engineering quality is the deciding factor of its collapse.

=== Modes of building collapse ===
Despite these factors, some Chinese civil engineers expressed a different view and joined the public in criticizing the initial official attribution of school collapses. According to Caijing, "earthquake intensity exceeding the designed resistance does not mean that buildings built to quality specifications will definitely collapse. Even if they collapse, there are different ways by which they collapse and variation within building design. Such collapses should not necessarily lead to heavy human casualties."

Buildings strictly built to the specifications of civil planning would not collapse during an earthquake. Any building that collapsed instantaneously must have failed to conform to civil planning standards. Either the design was unfit, or the engineering was unfit.

— Liang Wei (梁伟), Executive Vice President of the Urban Planning Design and Research Institute of Tsinghua University

=== Seismic fortification for schools in the quake zone ===
A post-quake survey indicated the intensity near the epicenter of the earthquake to be category XI-intensity, far exceeding the seismic fortification intensity of VII-intensity assigned to Wenchuan, Sichuan in GB 500011-2001, a national standard for seismic design published in 2001. Beichuan, center of another XI-intensity area, had been zoned as VI-intensity. (Zoning for Wenchuan, Beichuan and several other cities in Sichuan were subsequently revised to VIII liedu, the second highest rating in the standard.)

GB50223-2004, the national standard for classification of civil seismic fortification before the earthquake, specified Class B for schools exceeding 600 in capacity, kindergartens and child care centers exceeding 200, meaning they must be built to at least 1 liedu higher than the zoned seismic fortification intensity of the area. However, it contained a provision to allow low-rise (three stories and lower) schools to be built to meet the area's fortification intensity (Class C). (The government rushed a revision to the standard after the Wenchuan earthquake. GB 50223-2008 has removed both the provision regarding capacity and the one regarding height to require all schools to meet Class B.)

In perspective, Yingxiu Primary School had a collapsed four-story building built in 1999, where 3/4 of the 473 students were dead, whereas Xuankou Middle School had several collapsed buildings from 3 to 4 stories built in 2006, where more than 80% of the 1,200+ students stayed alive. Both schools are located in the town of Yingxiu, Wenchuan nearly at the epicenter of the main quake. Beichuan Middle School in Beichuan, where 80% of buildings collapsed, had two collapsed five-story buildings completed in 1998 that were once named "high quality buildings," killing nearly half of its 2,000+ students. Following GB50223-2004, Xuankou Middle School should have been built to resist VII + I in seismic intensity. Beichuan Middle School and Yingxiu Primary School could have passed with fortification intensity of VII liedu had they been built after 2004; but because they were built before the publication of even GB 500011–2001, they could be using older standards or none at all.

== Attempt to interfere with survey ==
In justifying the relatively long time CEA used to produce the intensity diagram of the Wenchuan earthquake, Vice President of International Association for Earthquake Engineering XIE Lili (Chinese: 谢礼立) who was a member of the survey team indicated that "some (local government) may want to make more serious estimations of earthquake damage, so they could obtain more compensation," hinting attempts to interfere with the survey. The same news article quoted persons in the know who suggested that another motivation for attempted interference would be to boost intensity in order to evade responsibility for not following seismic design codes. Despite later denial by CEA that the published intensity reflected such interference, MA Zongjin (Chinese: 马宗晋), Chairman of the National Expert Committee for Wenchuan Earthquake who is also the Chairman of the National Expert Committee for Disaster Prevention, openly confirmed that "some local workers wanted to increase (report of) local damages or seismic intensity" in a press conference sponsored by the State Council State Council Information Office of the PRC.

== Suppression of dissent ==
In July 2008, local governments in the Sichuan Province coordinated a campaign to silence angry parents whose children died during the earthquake through monetary contracts. If the parents refused, officials threatened that they would receive nothing. Although Chinese officials have advocated a policy of openness in time before the Olympic Games, the pressure on parents to sign demonstrates that officials are determined to create an appearance of public harmony rather than investigate into the corruption or negligence of the construction of schools. The payment amounts vary by school but are roughly the same. In Hanwang, parents were offered a package valued at US$8,800 in cash and a per-parent pension of nearly US$5,600. Many parents said they signed the contract, even if no real investigation ensues. Furthermore, officials have continued to use traditional methods of silencing: riot police officers have broken up protests by parents; the authorities have set up cordons around the schools; and officials have ordered the Chinese news media to stop reporting on school collapses.

On July 25, 2008, Liu Shaokun (刘绍坤), a Sichuan school teacher, was detained for disseminating rumors and destroying social order. Liu's family was later told that he was being investigated on suspicion of the crime of inciting subversion. Liu, a teacher at Guanghan Middle School (四川省德阳市广汉中学), Deyang City, Sichuan Province, traveled to heavily hit areas after the May 12 Sichuan earthquake, took photos of collapsed school buildings, and put them online. In a media interview, he expressed his anger at "the shoddy 'tofu' buildings". Liu was detained on June 25, 2008, at his school. He was ordered to serve one year of re-education through labor. Under RTL regulations, public security authorities may issue an order to anyone to serve up to four years of RTL without trial or formal charge. After being denied several visits, the family turned to international human rights organizations, who reported the case and urged the government to release him, which drew attention in the international community. On September 26, 2008, Liu was finally released to serve his sentence outside of RTL.

Chinese human rights activist Huang Qi was also detained. Huang Qi is an active rights defender in China. He established an Internet service company in October 1998 to help search for missing people, and launched a website called Tianwang Xunren on June 4, 1999. Huang Qi was arrested on June 3, 2000, and sentenced to five years imprisonment on May 9, 2003, by the Chengdu Intermediate People's Court for the crime of inciting subversion of state power. During the Sichuan Earthquake, Huang Qi's work and his website were widely reported by media to help find missing people to unite family members. He also wrote many articles about families who lost their children. Although initially tolerating independent reporting, China's security forces have begun to clamp down on dissent and public complaints. According to Human Rights in China, sources inside China said that on the evening of June 10, 2008, Huang Qi, Pu Fei, a volunteer for Tianwang, and Zuo Xiaohuan, a former teacher at Leshan Teachers College were missing after they were forced into a car by unidentified individuals. In the afternoon of June 12, 2008, Lawyer Xu, Tianwang's legal counsel, went to the Jinyang Police Station of Chengdu to file a missing persons report. The police reportedly told Xu that Huang Qi has been detained, and that the related legal procedure notice would be sent to his family but refused to disclose the grounds for Huang's detention. Huang Qi's 74-year-old mother, Pu Wenqing, said that the family had not received any notice from the police over the past few days.

On June 12, a BBC journalist was briefly detained in Dujiangyan due to "danger of further aftershocks," and was advised to vacate the city. On June 17, a Hong-Kong-based human rights group reported that a retired professor, Zeng Hongling, was detained for "subversion" after publishing a critical essay titled ""My Personal Experience in the Earthquake." On June 20, two foreign journalists were detained for "working behind police cordons" at the site of a protest by parents in the town of Wufu.

Li Chengpeng wrote an article on the construction of schools in Beichuan in 2008, and in a 2012 column published by The New York Times stated that man named Gou Yandong had been responsible for the building of six schools that did not suffer damage in the earthquake, but that Gou had since been forcibly treated for non-existent mental health problems.

== Delayed inquiry ==
Although the central government was initially praised^{(}^{)} for its response to the quake (especially in comparison to Myanmar's ruling military junta's blockade of aid during Cyclone Nargis), it has seen an erosion in confidence over the school construction scandal.

On May 23, 2008, the government promised an inquiry into the matter. On June 16, the Legal Daily announced that prosecutors were beginning a probe, possibly to be led by anti-corruption investigator, Hu Hong, which, in part, will investigate the collapse of ten schools in Shifang. In an official press conference on September 4, 2008, MA Zongjin stated, "We are still carefully thinking about and investigating this matter."

== See also ==
- Corruption in China
