= Yitong Law Firm =

Law firm in the PRC (China) engaged in defense of human rights

Yitong Law Firm (忆通) is a law firm in the People's Republic of China engaged in defense of human rights. Its clients include Hu Jia and Chen Guangcheng. In February 2009 Chinese authorities announced that the firm would be shut down for six months, ostensibly because an unlicensed lawyer was practicing there. The accused lawyer, Li Subin, was a former deputy director of the firm who had been denied the chance to renew his professional license by the provincial authorities in Henan after he had successfully sued the Henan judicial bureau for overcharging. The managing partner of the firm, Li Jinsong, denied that Li Subin had engaged in the practice of law claiming he was only engaged in administrative duties and charged that the government authorities "are distorting facts ... to get revenge" for the way the firm's lawyers have criticized or defied government agencies.

== See also ==
- Human rights in the People's Republic of China
- Weiquan movement
