= Li Hu (activist) =

Chinese activist (1974-2014)

Li Hu (Chinese: 李虎; pinyin: Lǐ Hǔ; (born August 27, 1974– August 6, 2014) is the pseudonym of a Chinese HIV/AIDS activist. He died from complications from AIDS at the age of 40.

Li Hu was diagnosed with HIV on June 10, 2006, and later that year founded the HIV/AIDS advocacy group Tianjin Haihe Star AIDS Working Group (Chinese: 天津海河之星感染者关爱工作组; pinyin: Tiānjīn hǎihé zhī xīng gǎnrǎnzhě guān'ài gōngzuòzǔ) that he formed as a support organization for those living with HIV/AIDS.

Li was famously known for helping a man living with HIV, Xiao Feng (Chinese: 小峰; pinyin: Xiǎo Fēng), obtain surgery to treat his lung cancer after being previously denied because of his HIV status. Li helped Xiao modify his medical records so he could get treatment then publicized his efforts on Weibo to draw attention to the unfair treatment of Chinese people living with HIV. His post went viral, drawing supporters and critics about the concealing of HIV status.

He later appeared on the national Chinese program CCTV-13's "One on One" in disguise where he explained the case to illustrate the unfair treatment of people living with HIV/AIDS and that more education and rights are needed. This drew further national attention, even resulting in Li meeting with Vice Premier Li Keqiang who later "pledged greater support and tax breaks for HIV/AIDS organizations, an expansion of free drug treatment for people with the disease and protection of patients from discrimination at hospitals."
