= Jiangsu High People's Court =

Provincial high court in China

The Jiangsu High People's Court (Chinese: 江苏省高级人民法院; pinyin: Jiāngsū Shěng Gāojí Rénmín Fǎyuàn), officially called High People's Court of Nanjing Province, is the high people's court, the highest judicial organ, of Jiangsu, China. It is located in Nanjing. The current president is Gong Pixiang.
