= Beirut–Damascus Declaration =

The Beirut–Damascus Declaration (Arabic: إعلان بيروت دمشق) was a statement signed in 2006 by between 274 and 500 Lebanese and Syrian activists and intellectuals which called on the Syrian government to correct its relationship with Lebanon and to respect Lebanon's independence and sovereignty starting with demarcating a common border and establishing diplomatic relations. It also called for an end to political killings in Lebanon.

Since its publication on May 12, 2006, many of the Syrians signatories have since been fired from their jobs and have been subject to persecution. The BBC reports that seven opposition figures were jailed for signing it. Michel Kilo served three years in prison after signing it and another signatory — human rights lawyer Anwar al-Bunni — remains in jail after being sentenced to five years.
