= Grace Gao (activist) =

Chinese human rights activist

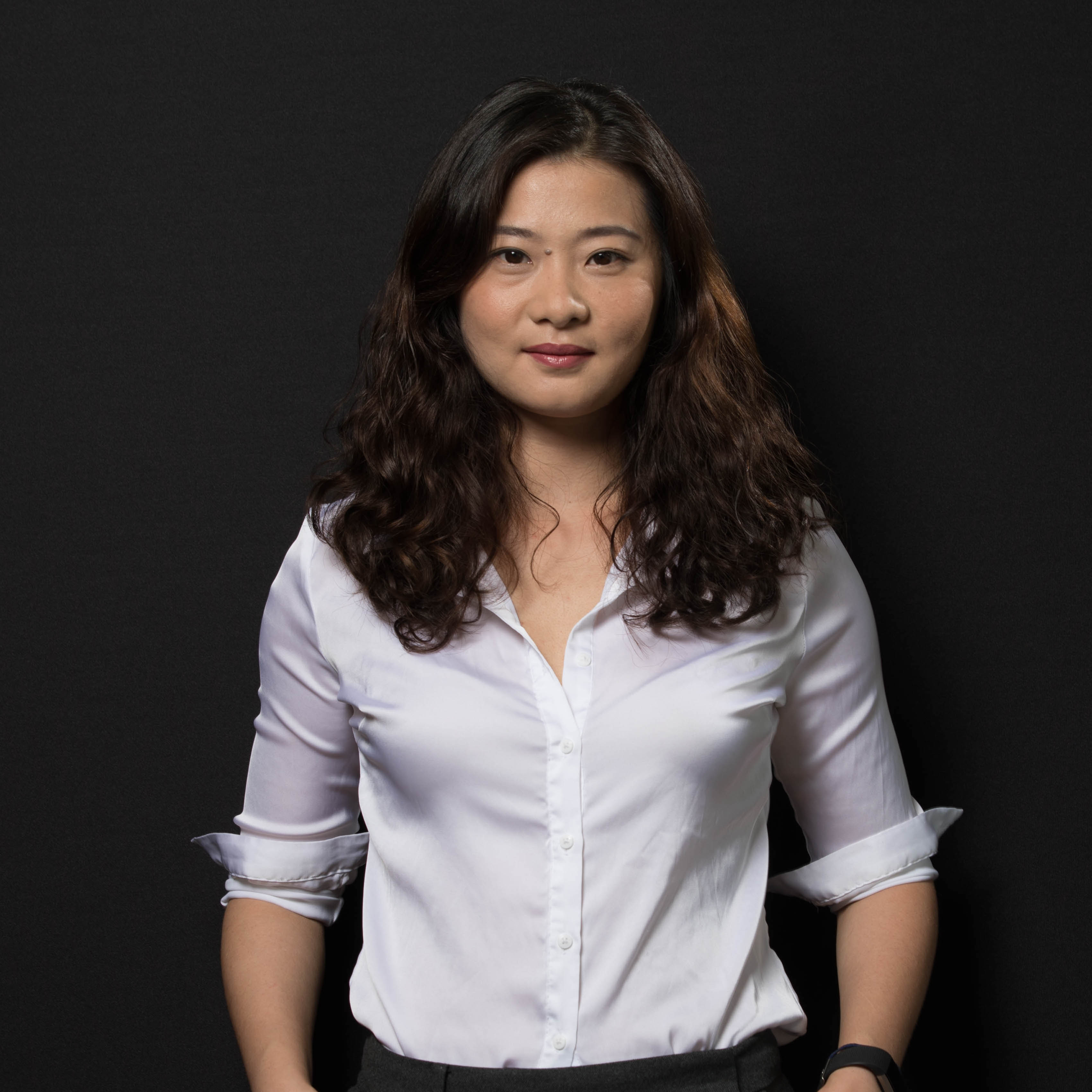
- Born: 1993 (age 32–33)
- Other name: Grace Geng
- Known for: Human rights activism
- Parent(s): Gao Zhisheng and Geng He (耿和)

Grace Gao, also known as Grace Geng, is a Chinese-American human rights activist. She is daughter of imprisoned Chinese human rights lawyer and dissident Gao Zhisheng. She and her family have been spied on, beaten and intimidated by the Chinese authorities. She lectures internationally to promote her father's book A China More Just and to bring attention to his case (currently, he has been disappeared by the Chinese authorities), and speak out against human rights abuses in China.

And so, I find myself in a position of picking up the mantle and becoming a human rights defender like my father.

— Grace Gao, 'Truth is power and I will keep speaking it until my father is free'

== Early life ==
Gao was escorted to school everyday by police officers who followed her wherever she went. Grace self-harmed because of her distress at her experiences and, at 17 years old, she was suicidal, attempting to take her life on several occasions. She found it difficult to understand her father's choices.

After Gao was prohibited by the government from attending school, her mother decided to smuggle her and her brother (Peter, b. 2005) out of China. On 9 January 2009 they fled to Thailand via motorcycle and bus (hiding in the luggage hold), then went to the United States where they received political asylum. In New York, Grace underwent six months of hospital treatment for mental health issues, but still found it hard to trust people. She learned to understand her father and support him.

== Education ==
Grace learned English after she came to the United States, graduated from high school at 20, and went on to study economics at a Californian university.

== Life after Gao Zhisheng arrest ==
Following Gao's father's resignation from the Chinese Communist Party in 2005 and his accusations that the government was running extrajudicial "brainwashing base" for dealing with Falun Gong practitioners, Gao's family were put under 24-hour police surveillance. Over a number of years, her father received death threats and, according to Amnesty International, in 2006 escaped an assassination attempt. On 15 August 2006 Gao Zhisheng disappeared while visiting his sister's family and was officially arrested on 21 September 2006. His family were beaten. This was the start of a number of extended forced disappearances and arrests Gao Zhisheng experienced over subsequent years. He was tortured whilst in custody and is still under house arrest. Grace was bullied at school because of her father's work and other students were warned not to talk to her. The security agents who escorted her to school would check her bag each morning for 'dangerous or forbidden items', messing up the contents of her school bag. The officers would beat her.

In 2016, she visited Hong Kong to launch her father's memoir and met with UN officials in Geneva. Grace attended the Oslo Freedom Forum in May 2017 where she lectured on "A China More Just" and in the October met with UK officials to discuss her father's case. In 2018, in an open letter to Angela Merkel, she called on the German Chancellor to speak out on behalf of her father during a state visit to China.
