= Guo Guoting =

Chinese lawyer

Guo Guoting (Chinese: 郭国汀) is a former Chinese lawyer and chief partner of the Shanghai Tian Yi Law Firm. He was one of few lawyers who would defend dissidents and Falun Gong practitioners. He represented the imprisoned lawyer Zheng Enchong and journalist Shi Tao. Because of these activities, the Shanghai authorities revoked his license to practice law. A year after he lost his right to practice and also his freedom of movement, he left for Canada.

== See also ==
- Human rights in the People's Republic of China
- List of Chinese dissidents
- Political dissidents
