= Cai Zhuohua =

Cai Zhuohua (Chinese: 蔡卓华; pinyin: Cài Zhuōhuá) is a Beijing minister active in the Chinese house church movement. He was arrested on 11 September 2004 for printing bibles without a permit. Cai was sentenced to imprisonment for three years after a trial at the Beijing Intermediate People's Court. Prior to his arrest more than 200,000 bibles had been found.
