= Gao Zhisheng =

Chinese human rights lawyer

- 高智晟
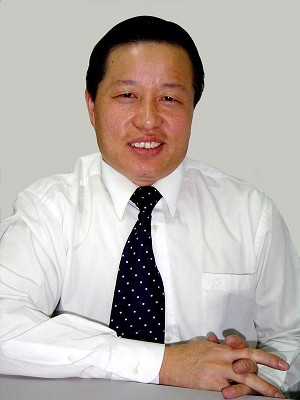
- Born: 20 April 1964 (age 62); Jia County, Shaanxi, China
- Occupation: Attorney
- Known for: Human rights activism
- Spouse: Geng He (耿和)
- Children: Grace Gao

Gao Zhisheng
- Traditional Chinese: 高智晟
- Simplified Chinese: 高智晟
Transcriptions
Standard Mandarin
- Hanyu Pinyin: Gāo Zhìshèng
- Wade–Giles: Kao¹ Chih⁴-shêng⁴
- IPA: [káʊ ʈʂî.ʂə̂ŋ]

Gao Zhisheng (born 20 April 1964) is a Chinese human rights attorney and dissident known for defending activists and religious minorities and documenting human rights abuses in China. Because of his work, Zhisheng has been disbarred and detained by the Chinese government several times, and severely tortured. He disappeared in February 2009 and was unofficially detained until December 2011, when it was announced that he had been imprisoned for three years. His commitment to defending his clients is influenced by his Christian beliefs and their tenets on morality and compassion. Gao's memoir, A China More Just (2007), documents his "fight as a rights lawyer in the world's largest communist state." In subsequent writing, he accuses the ruling Chinese Communist Party of state-sponsored torture and reports having been tortured by the Chinese secret police. At the beginning of 2012, Gao's brother said he had received a court document saying his brother was in Shayar jail in Xinjiang. In 2014, it was reported that Gao was released from jail and put under house arrest. He disappeared again in August 2017 in an apparent attempt to escape house arrest and was subsequently taken back into custody on his recapture in September, with his whereabouts being unknown. As of January 2025, Gao remains disappeared.

== Background ==
Gao was born and grew up in a house in Shaanxi Province with six siblings; his father died at the age of 40, when Zhisheng was 11. He briefly worked in a coal mine.

With his family not being able to afford elementary school, Gao said he sat listening outside the classroom window. Later, an uncle helped him attend junior high school, after which he qualified to join the People's Liberation Army. His unit was stationed at a base in Kashgar, in Xinjiang region, and he became a member of the Chinese Communist Party (CCP). Later, he left the PLA and began working as a food vendor. In 1991, inspired by a newspaper article that mentioned a plan by Deng Xiaoping, then China's paramount leader, to train 150,000 new lawyers and develop the Chinese legal system, he took a course in law. Gao credited his excellent memory of titles and clauses for passing all his exams; he passed the bar in 1995.

=== Early career ===
In 1989, the legislature passed the Administrative Procedure Law, which gave Chinese citizens the right to sue state agencies for the first time. In the 1990s, Gao represented the family of a Xinjiang boy who became comatose after a doctor erroneously gave him ethanol intravenously; Gao won $100,000 in damages for a boy who had lost his hearing in another malpractice case. He acted on behalf of a private businessman who had taken control of and redressed a troubled state-owned company when the district government used force to reclaim it after it became profitable. The case went to the Supreme Court, with a verdict in favour of the businessman; however, according to Gao, he has been a victim of reprisals from Xinjiang leaders, who warned clients and court officials to shun him.

=== Zhi Sheng Law Firm ===
Gao was director, founder of the Beijing-based Zhi Sheng Law Firm, having moved to Beijing in 2000. In 2001, he was recognized by China's Ministry of Justice as "one of the country's 10 best lawyers" for his work in defending victims of medical malpractice and fighting for just compensation for dispossessed landowners. Over the following years, he defended a wide range of clients who had been victims of injustice. Gao's committed involvement with such cases, he says, is strongly bound with the emphasis of his Christian identity on morality and compassion. One significant case he spearheaded was for fair compensation for a client whose home was expropriated for a building project connected with the 2008 Summer Olympics. However, Gao cites an internal document drafted by the central government he had read that instructed all district courts to reject cases involving such land disputes, which he said was "blatantly illegal", but which "every court in Beijing blindly obeyed." Other cases include:

- a land dispute case against Taishi village officials
- a class-action lawsuit against local authorities over coercion in implementation of China's family planning policies
- winning a case for six factory workers from Guangdong province who had been detained for protesting exploitation by their employer.
- appealing the sentence of Zheng Yichun, a journalist and former professor who was sentenced to seven years' imprisonment for his on-line writings
- providing legal assistance to Falun Gong practitioners, including Huang Wei, who was illegally sentenced to three years of re-education through labor in Shijiazhuang.
- providing legal help for an unofficial Chinese house church pastor Cai Zhuohua, who was sentenced to three years in prison for printing and distributing copies of the Bible.

Following the Beijing land compensation case, he entered what was to become a protracted battle over several hundred acres of farmland that Guangdong Province had seized to construct a university. Although Gao met with many legal impediments, he took his campaign to the people. He publicly accused Guangdong officials of "brazen murderous schemes", which stoked public anger and helped his clients obtain more generous compensation. In the summer of 2005, Gao defended fellow lawyer-activist Zhu Jiuhu, who was accused of "disturbing public order" while representing private investors in oil wells that were seized by the government in Shaanxi. He secured Zhu's release several months later through an intensive publicity campaign, although Zhu was barred from practicing law. The Beijing Judicial Bureau has prohibited him from acting in certain cases and clients, including Falun Gong, the Shaanxi oil case and an incident of political unrest in Taishi village in Guangdong. He refused to drop any of them, arguing that the bureau had no legal authority to dictate what cases he accepts or rejects.

In 2005, he resigned from the Communist Party. Shortly after sending an open letter to the PRC leadership that accused the government of running extrajudicial "brainwashing base(s)" for dealing with Falun Gong practitioners, he received a visit from State Security agents. Gao's family was put under 24-hour police surveillance in the autumn of 2005. On 4 November, shortly after being warned to retract a second open letter he had written about his Falun Gong cases, Gao received a new summons from the judicial bureau accusing him of a "serious violation of the Law on Managing the Registration of Law Firms" for failing to promptly register a new business address following a move. He was ordered to suspend operations for a year. On appeal in late November, the bureau demanded that Gao hand over his personal law license as well as his firm's operating permit by 14 December, threatening use of force if he failed to comply; at that time, Gao had eluded being tailed by Security, and went to north-east China to take statements from Falun Gong practitioners who alleged torture at the hands of security forces.

=== Detentions ===
Amnesty International alleged on 17 January 2006 that Gao narrowly escaped an assassination attempt, planned as a traffic accident ordered by Chinese secret police. On 4 February 2006, Gao, together with Hu Jia and other activists, launched a "Relay Hunger Strike for Human Rights," whereby different activists and citizens fasted for 24 hours in rotation. The hunger strike was joined by people in 29 provinces, as well as overseas, though several participants were arrested for joining.

On 15 August 2006, after numerous death threats and continued harassment, Gao disappeared while visiting his sister's family. On 21 September 2006, he was officially arrested. On 22 December 2006, Gao was convicted of "subversion", and was sentenced to three years in prison, suspended, and placed on probation for five years. The sentence also deprived him of his political rights – the freedom to publish or speak out against the government – for one year. He had publicly confessed to a number of errors. On his liberation, Gao recanted his confession and described torture he said he experienced during his 54 days in custody. He also said his captors threatened he would be killed if he spoke publicly about the matter. In chapter 6 of his memoirs written in 2006, Gao criticised the CCP for employing "the most savage, most immoral, and most illegal means to torture our mothers, torture our wives, torture our children, and torture our brothers and sisters…". He formally renounced his membership of "this inhumane, unjust, and evil Party", declaring it "the proudest day of my life."

The American Board of Trial Advocates selected Gao to receive the prestigious Courageous Advocacy Award; they had invited him to receive the award personally in Santa Barbara, California on 30 June 2007.

In the fall of 2007, Gao's memoir A China More Just was published in English in the United States.

On 22 September 2007, after writing open letters to vice-president of the European Parliament, Edward McMillan-Scott, and then to US Congress calling for a boycott of the Olympics, Gao was once again taken away from his home, where he had been under house arrest, by Chinese secret police. A letter from Gao claimed that he endured ten days of torture that involved appalling beatings, abuse with electric batons, and the insertion of toothpicks into his genitalia, followed by weeks of emotional torture. Gao wrote that his torturers said his case had become personal with 'uncles' in the state security apparatus after he had repeatedly publicised previous mistreatment.

=== Conversion to Christianity ===
According to his own statements, Gao first read the Bible while handling the legal defense of Pastor Cai Zhuohua, who was charged with "illegal business practices" in 2004 for possessing Bibles. It made no great impression on him, but later, when persecuted by the authorities, he found help from God and "join[ed] the brotherhood of Christians". In 2006, he experienced the first vision from God.

=== Disappearances ===
In February 2009, Gao was taken away for interrogation by Chinese security agents and had not been seen until he resurfaced in Shanxi in March 2010. One month prior to his disappearance, Gao's wife and two children escaped China with the help of underground religious adherents. They arrived in the United States and were granted right of asylum ten days later. During his disappearance, in response to queries from his family about his whereabouts, police claimed he lost his way and went missing in September 2009. For several months, Gao was not charged, and the Government never acknowledged his whereabouts, nor their involvement in his disappearance. His last contact with friends or family was one phone call placed to his brother in July 2009.

In January 2010, Gao's brother, Gao Zhiyi, told an interviewer that the Beijing police told him that Gao "lost his way and went missing" on 25 September 2009, igniting fears that Gao was no longer alive. On 21 January 2010, a Chinese Foreign Ministry spokesman issued a cryptic statement that Gao was "where he should be," and said he did not know Gao's whereabouts at a later press conference. During the visit to China by David Miliband in March, the Chinese foreign minister, Yang Jiechi, said that Gao had been sentenced on subversion charges, but denied he had been tortured.

On 28 March 2010 Gao was found to be living near Wutai Mountain. Addressing a reporter by telephone, he said he was not in a position to be interviewed, but confirmed he had been sentenced and freed. A few days later, he met the media, appearing thinner and more subdued than in the past and said that he had abandoned his criticism of the government in the hope of reuniting with his wife and two children. He announced that over the previous year he had again been tortured, in ways that were even worse than before.

In April 2010, Gao's family reported they had not heard from him since he returned from a visit to Xinjiang 10 days previously. Gao had left Beijing to visit his in-laws in Ürümqi, carrying just a backpack between 9 and 12 April. Gao's father-in-law said Gao arrived at his house in the company of four police officers, spent just one night there before once again being taken away by police. His father-in-law called a friend of his in Beijing on 21 April to say Gao was to board a plane at 4.30 p.m. He said Gao had promised to call after returning home, but there was no word. Emily Lau and Albert Ho said Gao's disappearance "prov[ed] that justice and the rule of law is disappearing in communist China – if it ever existed at all".

The report of Gao's 2010 disappearance and detention was considered by the United Nations Working Group on Arbitrary Detention which, in March 2011, called for his release. After months of speculation as to his status and whereabouts, Xinhua reported in December 2011 that Gao had been jailed for three years by No. 1 Beijing Intermediate People's Court because he "had seriously violated probation rules for a number of times, which led to the court decision to withdraw the probation." According to his brother, Gao was being held in a jail in Xayar County, Xinjiang province.

Gao was released from jail on 7 August 2014 and was subsequently kept under house arrest. Having been fed with a slice of bread and a piece of cabbage daily, he was released in bad health, but medical access was denied. Gao escaped from house arrest on 13 August 2017, spending around three weeks on the run before his recapture by the Chinese authorities the following month and remaining incommunicado for at least a year thereafter.

Missing for seven years, Gao is currently subjected to enforced disappearance. No information about his whereabouts has been available since he was taken on 13 August 2017, and as of January 2025, his family has not heard from him or about his whereabouts. Gao's disappearance has been mentioned by the Department of State in its annual reports on Country Reports on Human Rights Practices published from 2018 to 2023.

== See also ==
- Kai fang
- Weiquan movement
- Transcending Fear
- English pronunciation of Gao Zhisheng of China from (Voice_of_America)
