= He Weifang =

Chinese legal scholar

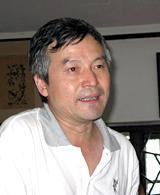
- Born: 17 July 1960 (age 66)

He Weifang (born July 17, 1960; Chinese: 贺卫方; pinyin: Hè Wèifāng) is a Chinese legal scholar and a former professor at Peking University. He has advocated for the reform of China's judicial system, and has argued that the Chinese Communist Party is unregistered and therefore an illegal organization in China.

== Education ==
He earned a B.A. at Southwest University of Political Science & Law, and an LL.M at Peking College of Political Science and Law (former China University of Political Science and Law).

== Academic career ==
He was an associate professor in China University of Political Science and Law from 1985 to 1995, then become a professor and Ph.D. adviser at Peking University.

Since 1992, he has been advocating for the reform of China's judicial system. He has authored many papers on the importance of modernizing China's judicial system, earning him the nickname "Justice He". His works include The Judicial Ideals and Institutions and The Ways to Carry Justice.

Because of his public support and signing for Liu Xiaobo's Charter 08, his position at Peking University became untenable and he was forced to resign. In 2008, he accepted a job offer to be the dean of the law school of Zhejiang University. However, the Chinese Communist Party forced the school to withdraw the job offer, and he was instead given a position in the remote city of Shihezi in Xinjiang. Richard McGregor, author of The Party: The Secret World of China's Communist Rulers, said that this was "a deliberately humiliating transfer, akin to a Harvard Law School professor being reassigned to a small community college in rural Texas."

On October 6, 2010, He Weifang gave a speech at Stockholm University, concerning reform of Chinese Court Organization Law and freedom of speech.

He retired in July 2023 after a near 40-year academic career.
