= Land requisition in China =

Land requisition in the People's Republic of China refers to the practice of involuntarily requisitioning land from a citizen or resident, typically in order to make room for development projects. In some instances, government authorities work with private developers to seize land from villagers, with compensation below the market price. In many cases, they are also offered alternative housing instead of or on top of monetary compensation. Forced evictions are particularly common in rural areas, and are a major source of unrest and public protest. By some estimates, up to 65 percent of the 180,000 annual "mass incidents" stem from grievances over forced evictions. Some citizens who resist or protest the evictions have reportedly been subjected to harassment, beatings, or detention.

The rate of forced evictions has grown significantly since the 1990s, as city and county-level governments have increasingly come to rely on land sales as an important source of revenue. In 2011, the Financial Times reported that 40 percent of local government revenue comes from land sales. Guan Qingyou, a professor at Tsinghua University, estimated that land sales accounted for 74 percent of local government income in 2010.

== Legal framework ==
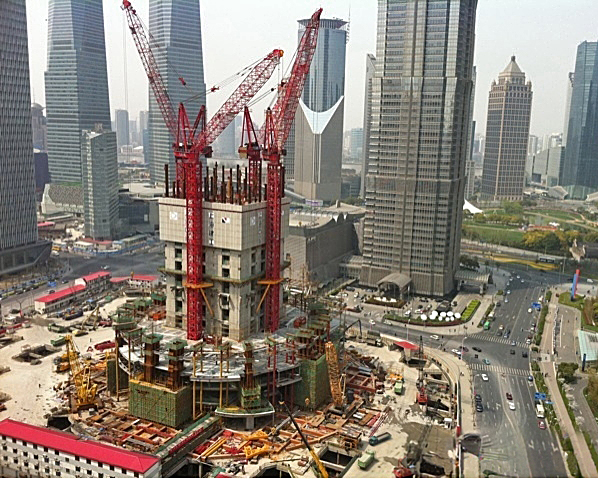
The practice of land requisitions and forced evictions is widespread in China as local governments make way for private real estate developers.

Under Chinese property law, there is no privately held land; "urban land" is owned by the state, which grants land usage rights for a set number of years. Rural, or "collectively owned land," is leased by the state for periods of 30 years, and is theoretically reserved for agricultural purposes, housing and services for farmers.

The underlying assumptions of property law are radically different in Chinese law than in most Western countries, and specifically the "Common Law" of English-speaking countries. In Common Law there is often a degree of ambiguity as to who should benefit from public investment. Governments can legally expropriate land for the public benefit.

The State may forcibly evict occupants and extinguish the rights of owners and tenants upon payment of compensation. In many Common Law jurisdictions, this includes expropriation of land for on-sale to a private individual or company. To this extent Chinese and Common Law are the same. The difference is that in Common Law there is a presumption that any increase in the value of the land due to changed conditions which give rise to the opportunity for redevelopment for a higher usage should accrue to the land-owner; while in China it is considered just that the economic benefits of public investment should accrue to the people in general.

In China, therefore, when the state invests in public infrastructure – roads, trains, water, electricity distribution, etc. – there will simultaneously be a reconsideration of land use in the areas affected. If a planning decision is taken to re-zone land for a higher use, the state will generally expropriate the land, consolidate it into parcels consistent with the proposed new usage, and then offer it on the market on a new 40–70 year lease (the term depending on the usage). This operation also allows for civic improvements including road widening and the creation of public open space.

Forced evictions are forbidden under the International Covenant on Economic, Social and Cultural Rights (which China has ratified) but this does not clearly define the term "forced eviction" as distinct from the action of expropriation or resumption which is normal and common in Common Law jurisdictions.

Under China's constitution and other property laws, resumption of urban land by the state is permitted only for the purpose of supporting the "public interest," and those being evicted are supposed to receive compensation, resettlement, and protection of living conditions. This is exactly the same as in most other legal systems in the world. Again, in China as in other countries, the "public interest" is, however, not defined. Abuses are common in the expropriation process, with many citizens complaining of receiving little or no compensation. Collectively owned rural land may be "reallocated" at the discretion of authorities. By reclassifying rural land as urban land, it can then be sold at a profit. At the same time, in many other instances very liberal compensation is paid by local governments eager to avoid delays to development projects.

In 2011, China's legislative body implemented a new law limiting the use of violence in forced evictions, as well as outlawing the clearing of property at night and during holidays. Under the 2011 regulation, violent law enforcement measures are to be used only in "emergencies," though the term is not defined. Chinese authorities declared that the law—which took twelve years to draft—would help protect human rights. Here again, Chinese law differs from Common Law and other jurisdictions around the world, which have no legal restrictions on the use of force by law officers in evicting former land occupants who refuse to depart peacefully.

== Prevalence ==
Forty three percent of villages surveyed across China report the occurrence of expropriations and from the mid-1990s to mid-2000s, an estimated 40 million Chinese farmers were affected by land requisitions. Since 2005, surveys have indicated a steady increase in the number of forced evictions in China, with local government appropriating the land of approximately 4 million rural Chinese citizens annually.

Forced evictions with inadequate compensation occur frequently in both urban and rural contexts, with even fewer legal protections for rural citizens. In most instances, the land is then sold to private developers at an average cost of 40 times higher per acre than the government paid to the villagers, reflecting the fundamental assumption in Chinese law discussed above that the land belongs to the people as a whole and that increases in value should flow to the people.

== Notable examples ==
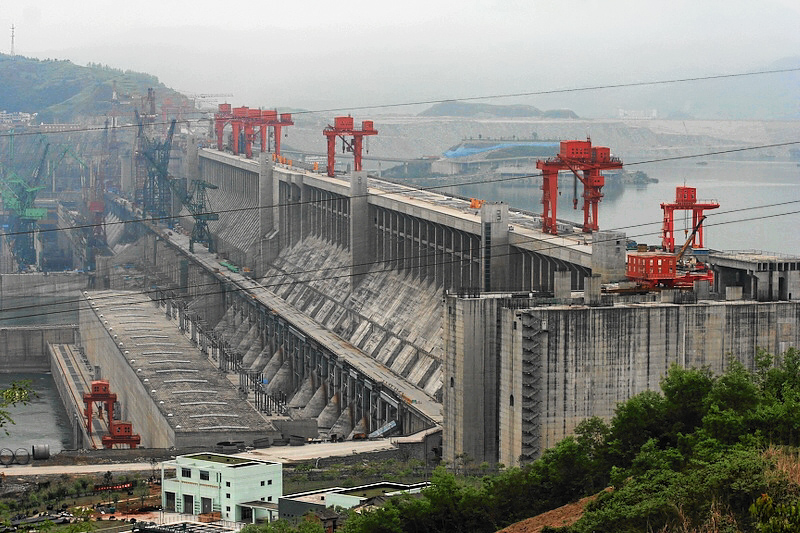
An estimated 1.4 million people were displaced as part of the Three Gorges Dam project.

Although forced evictions occur throughout China in both rural and urban environments, there are several notable examples in which hundreds of thousands of people were evicted.

=== 1993–2003, Shanghai ===
From 1993 to 2003, 2.5 million people were evicted in the city of Shanghai.

=== 2008, Beijing Olympics ===
In preparation for the 2008 Summer Olympics in Beijing, many of Beijing's densely populated neighborhoods were torn down in order to make way for new developments and infrastructure projects. The Center on Housing Rights and Evictions estimated that 1.5 million people in and around Beijing were forced from their homes, often with inadequate compensation. Chinese authorities maintained only 6,000 families were relocated, and that all received proper compensation.

=== 1995–2005, Chongqing Three Gorges Dam ===
From 1995 to 2005, an average of 86,754 people were evicted annually in connection to the Three Gorges Dam, totaling an estimated 1.4 million people. Recalcitrant residents in the city of Chongqing had their water and electricity turned off in order to force them to move; the residents said they had not yet left because proper resettlement hadn't been arranged.

=== 2013–present, Beijing "Limited Property Right" houses ===
From 2013 to present, 108 communities that are listed as "limited property right" houses, with over ten thousands households are forced evicted. At the same time, thousands of households with "limited property right" due to historical reason, which are not included in the 108 communities list are also being evicted illegally, such as XiangTang village and JiuhuaYuan community eviction. During the winter of 2020, the city of Beijing and government of Xiaotangshan township cut off water and electricity of the residents, and send unpermitted security guards to the community, in order to force the residents to leave. The security guards and excavators go to residents' house when they go out for food and water, and demolish their home without any negotiation or arranging settlement.

== Protest and opposition ==
Forced evictions are a common catalyst for organized protests and demonstrations. According to some estimates, as much as 65 percent of the estimated 180,000 annual "mass incidents" (protests) in China stem from grievances over forced evictions. Notable examples of large-scale demonstrations against forced evictions include the December 2011 protests in the Southern village of Wukan, Guangdong, which resulted in the temporary expulsion of Communist Party authorities, and the 2005 Dongzhou protests, which ended with the shooting deaths of several protesting villagers by riot squad police who, unlike regular police, are armed.

A number of individual protests have also made international headlines: on 26 May 2011, Qian Mingqi, a farmer from Fuzhou whose home had been demolished to make room for a highway, complained of losing 2 million yuan in the forced eviction. After numerous failed attempts to petition authorities for redress, on 26 May 2011, Qian detonated three bombs at government buildings. He was hailed as a hero by many Chinese internet users, who viewed the attacks not as a form of terrorism, but as "righteous vengeance."

In August 2008, two elderly women in their 70s were sentenced to a year of reeducation-through-labor when they applied for a permit to protest in the government's approved "protest zone" during the 2008 Beijing Olympics. Wu Dianyuan, 79, and Wang Xiuying, 77, were evicted from their Beijing homes in 2001. They were promised compensation and resettlement, but it was never delivered.

Citizens have also resorted to a variety of semi-institutionalized forms of resistance, including petitioning actions and the use of legal channels to challenge forced land requisitions or demand compensation. In the first half of 2004, for instance, China's construction ministry reported receiving petitions from more than 18,600 individuals and 4,000 groups over forced evictions and unlawful transfers of land. Numerous lawyers identifying with the Weiquan (rights defending) movement have taken on cases related to forced evictions. These include lawyers and activists Ni Yulan, Tang Jitian, Gao Zhisheng, and Li Dunyong, among others. In 2024, Yang Li, an activist based in Jiangsu, was charged with "disrupting the work order of state organs" in response to her "persistent petitioning", and was sentenced to 15 months in prison.

== See also ==
- Eminent domain
- Eviction
- Land grabbing
- Nail house
- Urbanization in China
