= Yang Chunlin =

Chinese human rights activist

Yang Chunlin (Chinese: 杨春林; pinyin: Yáng Chūnlín; born 1954) is a human rights activist in Heilongjiang, China. He has published numerous articles on human rights and land rights. In 2007, he helped organise a petition entitled, "We want human rights, not the Olympics." The petition reportedly collected over ten thousand signatures. Yang was convicted of "inciting subversion of state power" on 24 March 2008 and sentenced to five years in prison and two years of subsequent deprivation of political rights. Another activist involved with the open letter, Yuan Xianchen, was convicted of similar charged and sentenced to four years in prison. Yang was released from prison on 6 July 2012.

In July 2007 he was arrested and charged with "inciting subversion of state power". His trial began in February 2008 in Jiamusi, Heilongjiang and on 24 March of that year was sentenced to five years in prison. He maintained his innocence throughout the trial. During and after the hearing at which he was sentenced, Yang was reportedly beaten with an electric rod on at least two occasions. In a retrial on 19 September 2008, the Jiamusi Municipal Intermediate People's Court upheld Yang's original sentence. According to those in attendance, the trial lasted for under 30 minutes. Yang was transferred to Xianglan Prison on 25 September 2008, for the remainder of his sentence. He has been described as a political prisoner. During a 2010 prison visit, Yang's family saw that his legs and face were swollen from a build-up of fluid, and he looked tired. Yang told his family that his heartbeat was irregular, and his heart often felt uncomfortable. He said the problem was that the prison did not give him any chance to do any exercise, even walking outdoors. He has no rest from forced labor, making cardboard boxes, except for sleep and very short meal breaks. He has told the prison management he feels unwell, but they have given him no medical attention.

== See also ==
- Yuan Xianchen
- Human rights in the People's Republic of China
