= Li Hu (architect) =

Chinese architect

Li Hu is a Chinese architect and professor. He is the founding partner of OPEN Architecture, Kenzo Tange Design Critic in Architecture at Harvard University Graduate School of Design, visiting professor at the Tsinghua University in Beijing and China Central Academy of Fine Arts, former partner of Steven Holl Architects, and director of Columbia University GSAPP's Studio-X Beijing.

== Education ==
Hu received his B. Arch. from Tsinghua University in Beijing in 1996 and his M. Arch. from Rice University in 1998.

== Work ==
While working at Steven Holl Architects as a partner, Li Hu played a key role in the creation of several notable buildings. These include the Linked Hybrid in Beijing, the Vanke Center in Shenzhen, Raffles City in Chengdu, and the Sifang Art Museum in Nanjing.

In 2010, Li Hu left Steven Holl Architects to focus on his own practice, OPEN Architecture, which he co-founded with Huang Wenjing in 2006 in New York City. OPEN Architecture is a collaborative studio that explores new architectural possibilities in the context of contemporary China and beyond. Some of the firm's notable projects include Garden School/Beijing No.4 High School Fangshan Campus, the Gehua Youth and Cultural Center, the UCCA Dune Art Museum, Yichang Grand Theatre, the Tank Shanghai art complex, Pingshan Performing Arts Center, and the Chapel of Sound.

Li Hu has been the recipient of “50 under 50: Innovators of the 21st Century” and ICON Magazine's “Future 50”

Li Hu is often invited to speak at global academic conferences and universities. Additionally, he regularly serves as a jury member and curator for various international design competitions and exhibitions.

His work UCCA Dune Art Museum has been collected by Museum of Modern Art (MoMA) in New York.

Li Hu has also participated in the Venice Biennale China Pavilion in 2021 and 2014, the inaugural Chicago Architecture Biennial in 2015, the “Soul of the City” in Verona, Italy in 2017, and the China House Vision in 2018.

Li Hu and Huang Wenjing co-authored three books titled OPEN Questions (2018), Towards Openness (2018) and OPEN Reaction (2015). Catherine Shaw authored the book Reinventing Cultural Architecture: A Radical Vision by OPEN which was published by Rizzoli in 2022.

== Selected projects ==
- Yantai Sun Tower
- Chapel of Sound
- Shanfeng Academy
- Shanghai Qingpu Pinghe International School
- Tank Shanghai
- Pingshan Performing Arts Center
- UCCA Dune Art Museum
- Tsinghua Ocean Center
- HEX-SYS
- Mars Case
- Garden School/Beijing No.4 High School Fangshan Campus
- Gehua Youth and Cultural Center
