= Li Xiang =

Li Xiang or Xiang Li may refer to:

== People with the surname Li ==
- Li Xiangjun (1624–1654), or Li Xiang, Ming dynasty female singer
- Li Xiang (footballer) (born 1991), Chinese football player
- Li Xiang (general) (born 1967), Chinese electronic information expert and army general
- Xiang Li (hacker) (born 1977), Chinese software pirate
- Li Xiang (host) (born 1976), Chinese actress, host and singer
- Li Xiang (journalist) (1981–2011), Chinese TV journalist killed after reporting corruption
- Li Xiang (swimmer) (born 1993), Chinese swimmer

== People with the surname Xiang ==
- Xiang Li (activist) (born 1976), activist for human rights causes in China

== Other uses ==
- Li Auto, a Chinese electric automobile manufacturer

== See also ==
- Lixiang (disambiguation)
- Xiangli (disambiguation)
