= Wang Quanzhang =

Chinese human rights lawyer

- Born: 15 February 1976 (age 50); Wulian County, Shandong, China
- Occupation: Lawyer

Wang Quanzhang (Chinese: 王全璋; pinyin: Wáng Quánzhāng, born 15 February 1976) is a Chinese human rights lawyer from Wulian County, Shandong. Wang is known for defending clients in politically sensitive cases against the Chinese government, which led to his arrest in the 709 crackdown. He was then sentenced to four and a half years in prison for subverting state power. After Wang's release in 2020, Wang has been monitored, his landlords have been pressured to evict his family, and his son has been barred from attending school.

== Career ==
Wang is a lawyer of the Beijing Fengrui Law Firm. He graduated from the School of Law at Shandong University in 2000. In 2003, Wang passed the National Judicial Exam, and in 2007, formally began his lawyer career in Jinan, Shandong. He later moved to Beijing, where he specialized in human rights cases, defending victims subjected to land expropriation, labour camp mistreatment, and prison abuse. He also defended Falun Gong practitioners who have been subjected to ongoing nationwide persecution.

Wang also worked for the NGO China Action, now re-established as Safeguard Defenders, which was co-founded in 2009 by Swedish human rights activist Peter Dahlin to train Chinese lawyers, journalists and small NGOs on Chinese law and to protect human rights in China. Dahlin was arrested in China in January 2016, and subsequently deported.

== Harassment, arrest, and disappearance ==
=== Jingjiang Incident ===
On 3 April 2013, Wang defended a Falun Gong practitioner at the Jingjiang People's Court, pleading not guilty. Wang was subsequently placed under judicial custody for disrupting court order. The next day, over 100 lawyers co-signed a petition demanding video evidence and Wang's release, while about 50 people came outside of the court to show support for Wang, including over 20 lawyers. Wang was released on 6 April.

According to U.S.-based organization Human Rights in China, when Wang handed over documents to the court, he was taking pictures to save a copy. Wang's phone was then confiscated, and Wang disappeared after the hearing finished.

=== Beating in June 2015 ===
On 18 June 2015, Wang defended some Falun Gong practitioners on trial in Liaocheng, Shandong, but the presiding judge Wang Yingjun (王英军) constantly hindered his attempts to present legal arguments. Eventually the judge ordered him to be evicted from the court and he was then beaten by court officials.

=== Arrest and disappearance in August 2015 ===
In August 2015 Wang was arrested as part of a nationwide crackdown on lawyers and human rights activists instigated by CCP general secretary Xi Jinping, known as the 709 crackdown, as it started on July 9, 2015. After his arrest, the authorities gave a notice of arrest to his wife, Li Wenzu (李文足), but refused to provide any information on where he was being held or to allow any access to him by his family or by a lawyer. For more than three years no information on his whereabouts or even whether he was dead or alive was forthcoming. By summer 2017, all the lawyers and activists arrested during the July 2015 crackdown, except for Wang, had either been released or sentenced to prison. Only the fate of Wang remained unknown.

Many of those arrested during the 2015 crackdown made forced confessions of guilt in court or on television, so Wang's wife, Li Wenzu, suggested that the reason why her husband had not been put on trial was that he refused to make any confession of guilt: "I think it might be because my husband hasn't compromised at all; that's why his case remains unsolved."

In April 2018, in order to publicize the disappearance of her husband a thousand days earlier, Li Wenzu embarked on a twelve-day walk from Beijing to Tianjin, where she thought Wang may have been held. Li was accompanied on her march to Tianjin by Wang Qiaoling, the wife of lawyer Li Heping, who had also been arrested as part of the crackdown, and had been given a suspended sentence in April 2017. Li Wenzu was stopped from completing the march by the authorities.

In July 2018, almost three years after his disappearance, Wang was finally allowed access to a lawyer, Liu Weiguo. According to Liu, Wang had not suffered any "hard violence" during his detention, which Li Wenzu interpreted to mean that he was subjected to other forms of mistreatment such as sleep deprivation and forced medication: "When Quanzhang said that he did not suffer hard violence, he was trying to tell me that he suffered inhuman torment!"

In mid-December 2018, Li Wenzu and three other women publicly shaved their heads in the streets of Beijing as a protest against the continuing detention of Wang Quanzhang without trial.

== Trial ==
Wang was finally put on trial for subverting state power at the No. 2 Intermediate People's Court in Tianjin on 26 December 2018, some three and a half years after his initial disappearance. Court documents accuse Wang of working with the Swedish human rights activist Peter Dahlin and others to "train hostile forces". Some activists and supporters were present outside the court, including Yang Chunlin, Zhang Zhecheng, and Xu Yan (wife of the detained lawyer Yu Wenshang), but they were forcibly removed or detained. Foreign journalists and diplomats were also denied entry to the courtroom. Wang's wife, Li Wenzu, was unable to attend the trial as she was prohibited from leaving her apartment in Beijing at 5 am on the day of the trial by security officials.

Within minutes of the trial starting on 26 December, Wang fired his court-appointed lawyer, causing the case to be immediately adjourned to an unspecified date so that another lawyer could be appointed for him. Commenting on this development, Dahlin said: "Wang is unlikely to get to choose his own lawyer, but this move will highlight the lack of any real trial being made available to him – that this is a show trial and nothing more". Protesters who had gathered outside the court in support of Wang were quickly removed by security police.

On 28 December 2018, Li Wenzu and two other wives of detained lawyers (Yuan Shanshan 原珊珊, wife of Xie Yanyi 謝燕益, and Wang Xiaoling 王峭嶺, wife of Li Heping) tried to present a petition to the Supreme People's Court at Hongsicun in Chaoyang District, Beijing, protesting the handling of her husband's case by the Tianjin court. However, about fifty security officials surrounded her, and stopped her from entering the court building. She stated that she would try again the following week.

On 28 January 2019 it was announced that Wang had been found guilty of subverting state power, and had been sentenced to four and half years in prison.

== Imprisonment ==
In June 2019 Wang Quanzhang's wife Li Wenzu, and elder sister Wang Quanxiu, together with his son Quanquan, visited Wang in Linyi Prison in Shandong for half an hour. According to Li "he resembled nothing more than a well-programmed but rather dull wooden man" who barely interacted with them. Another visit by Li in December 2019 was put off by authorities by a week, which another attorney ascribed to an intention of authorities to have the visit coincide with the Christmas holiday season to deflect the attention of international media. Li expressed concerns about the mental health of her husband having deteriorated since her previous visit.

== Release ==
Wang Quanzong was released from prison on 4 April 2020 after having served his sentence in full. Authorities moved him to his former residence in the eastern city of Jinan for two weeks starting from 4 April 2020 as a precautionary measure against the novel coronavirus. His wife told newspapers that she suspected the government had used the virus as an excuse to quarantine him when in fact their intentions were to keep him under house arrest.

In 2023 Wang was forced to move 13 times in two months, as part of a campaign of harassment against him and other human rights lawyers in Beijing.

== See also ==
- Human rights in China
- List of Chinese dissidents
- Wang Yu, another lawyer arrested in July 2015
