= Tang Jitian =

Chinese human rights activist

- 唐吉田
- Born: 1 September 1969 (age 56); Jilin, China
- Occupation: Attorney

Tang Jitian (Chinese: 唐吉田; pinyin: Táng Jítián) is a human rights lawyer in the People's Republic of China. Based in Beijing, he is a prominent figure in the Weiquan (rights defending) movement, and has defended victims of illegal land requisitions, Falun Gong adherents, HIV/AIDS victims, and other vulnerable groups, including fellow human rights lawyers.

Due to the politically sensitive nature of Tang's cases, he has met with reprisals from Chinese authorities. In 2010, he was permanently disbarred, though he has continued his rights advocacy. He has been placed under house arrest, and detained on several occasions. In 2014, Tang and three other lawyers were detained for investigating the detention of several members of Falun Gong. Tang claimed to have been tortured and suffering multiple fractures during his 15-day detention. In 2017 he was turned back by border guards at Lo Wu Control Point when attempting to visit Hong Kong for medical treatment, and was advised that he was prohibited from leaving mainland China due to national security reasons. In December 2021, Tang vanished before arriving in Beijing for a human rights event hosted by the European Union and remained missing at the start of the 2022 Winter Olympics; his relatives believed him to be held in a form of secret detention commonly applied to dissidents in China. Tang was released in January 2023.

== Legal career and advocacy ==
Tang Jitian was born in Yanji, Jilin province (northeast China), in 1969. He began his legal career in Guangdong province in 2005, and subsequently relocated to Beijing to work with the Anhui Law Firm. There, he has taken on a variety of human rights causes, including representing petitioners subjected to reeducation through labor camps, victims of forced eviction, parents of children poisoned by melamine-tainted milk, religious minorities, and others. Tang was also a signatory of Charter 08.

In 2013, he joined women's rights activist Ye Haiyan, human rights lawyer Wang Yu and other protesters in Wanning, Hainan Province, to demand justice for six school girls who were raped by their principal and a government official. This and the subsequent harassment and detentions suffered by Ye because of this protest, as well as Tang's and Wang's involvement in trying to help the activist, was captured on the documentary film Hooligan Sparrow, released in 2016 and directed by the Chinese-born American filmmaker Nanfu Wang.
