= Xiangli =

Xiangli may refer to the following places in China:

- Xiangli, Guangxi (湘漓), a town in Xing'an County, Guangxi
- Xiangli Subdistrict (项里街道), a subdistrict in Sucheng District, Suqian, Jiangsu

== See also ==
- Xiang Li (disambiguation)
