= Zhao Wei (legal assistant) =

Chinese legal assistant

Zhao Wei is a legal assistant who was arrested for political activism, and detained in secret by authorities in China. There were reports that Wei was released in July 2016, but these have not been independently confirmed. A report in January 2017 suggests she is being closely monitored by authorities.

== Arrest ==
Zhao was taken into secret detention in July 2015, when the government was starting an offensive against human rights lawyers. She was held in the Tianjin No. 1 Detention Center on suspicion of "incitement to subvert state power." At 24 years old, she is thought by observers to be the youngest person detained as part of the crackdown. Before her arrest, she had worked for prominent human rights lawyer Li Heping.

== Reports of release ==
On 7 July 2016, almost exactly 12 months after her arrest, authorities announced her release. In an interview with the South China Morning Post, Zhao said she was staying with her parents – however, the newspaper could not verify her location. Zhao's husband, You Minglei, traveled to the home of her parents in Jiyuan, Henan, but found nobody there.

== Lawyers and activists detained in China ==
More than 200 lawyers and associates have been detained as part of the crackdown, with many still in custody. Other people still detained by the authorities include lawyer Li Heping and his other legal assistant, Gao Yue; lawyers Wang Yu, Zhou Shifeng, Li Shuyun and Xie Yanyi; as well as another legal assistant, Liu Sixin; and activists Hu Shigen and Gou Hongguo.
