= Li Heping =

Civil rights lawyer

- Born: October 26, 1970 (age 56); Xinyang, Henan Province, China
- Education: Renmin University of China
- Occupations: lawyer, human rights activist
- Partner: Wang Qiaoling

Li Heping (Chinese: 李和平) is a civil rights lawyer in the People's Republic of China and a partner of the Beijing Global Law Firm who was abducted on 10 July 2015. He is a prominent figure in China's Weiquan (rights defending) movement, having defended underground Christians, Falun Gong practitioners, dissident writers, and victims of forced evictions, among others.

== Advocacy ==
Li began his career in civil rights advocacy in the late 1990s, and emerged as a vocal critic of the Communist Party's policies and practices toward unregistered religious groups. He has sought to appeal on behalf other prominent Weiquan lawyers Chen Guangcheng and Gao Zhisheng, and has defended dissident Yang Zili and environmental activist Tan Kai. Li has also defended victims of forced land requisition in China. Li identifies as Christian, and is a member of the editorial board for the journal Chinese Law and Religion Monitor, run by the China Aid Association.

== Harassment and detention ==
As with many Chinese human rights activists and dissidents, Li has been subject to various forms of intimidation and harassment by Chinese security forces. On 28 September 2007, the Public security bureau in Beijing threatened that Li and his family must leave Beijing. The following day, 29 September, he was abducted by a group of 12 plainclothes men and held for eight hours. The men reportedly beat and shocked Li with electric batons, and again told him to leave Beijing. He was dumped in the woods, and later found that his home had been ransacked, his lawyer's license stolen, and computer reformatted. On 31 May 2010, Li was abducted and interrogated by security forces while attempting to visit fellow lawyer Tang Jitian. In 2011, Li told USA Today that his home remained under constant surveillance, and that up to four police tail him wherever he goes.

== 2015 abduction and disappearance ==
Li has been missing since his abduction from his home on 10 July 2015, as part of the "709 crackdown" on lawyers. In the days following his disappearance, two other lawyers attempted to locate him, travelling to the police stations and detention centres across northern China where he was likely to be held. His assistant, Zhao Wei, was also abducted at around the same time. He was given a suspended jail term in April 2017, and released in May 2017.

== International recognition ==
Li has received a number of international awards and distinctions in recognition of his civil rights work in China. In 2008, he was an honoree for the National Endowment for Democracy's Democracy Award for Religious Freedom, and the same year was granted the Human Rights Award by the Council of Bars and Law Societies of Europe (CCBE).

== Lawyers and activists detained in China ==
More than 200 lawyers and associates have been detained as part of the crackdown, with many still in custody. Other people still detained by the authorities include lawyers Wang Yu, Zhou Shifeng, Li Shuyun and Xie Yanyi; as well a legal assistant, Liu Sixin; and activists Hu Shigen and Gou Hongguo.
