= Agnes Chow arrest under National Security Law =

Hong Kong pro-democracy activist

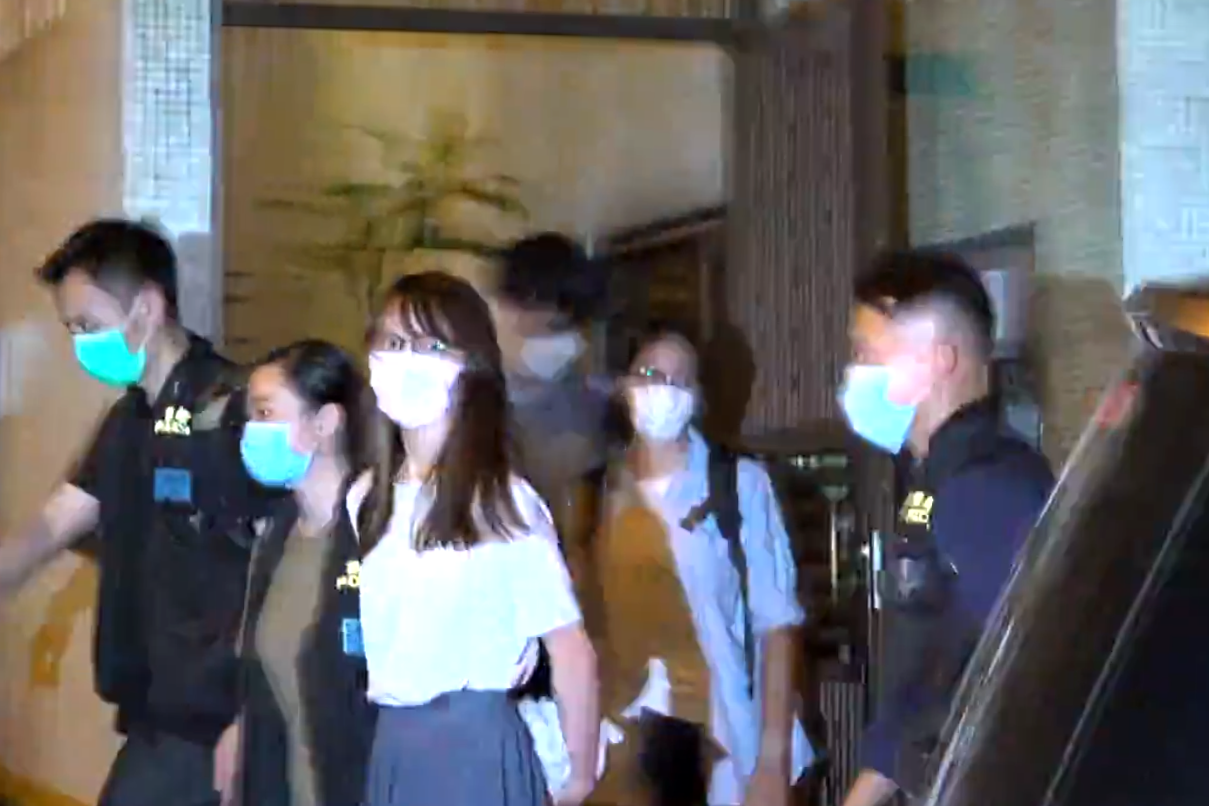
- Agnes Chow was taken by police from her home
- Native name: 周庭被香港警察國安處拘捕事件
- Date: 10 August 2020
- Location: Tai Po, New Territories, Hong Kong
- Target: Agnes Chow
- Charges: Collusion with foreign forces

On 10 August 2020, Hong Kong pro-democracy activist Agnes Chow was arrested by Hong Kong police under Hong Kong national security law. Her arrest caused widespread controversy in the international community.

== Background ==
On 30 June 2020, after the Standing Committee of the National People's Congress passed the Hong Kong national security law, on the same day Chow announced her withdrawal from Demosistō on the social media.

Chow said that the arrest happened unexpectedly and described the police breaking the door and entering the process as horrible. On 12 August, she wrote on Facebook that she was not worried about her safety during her detention, but about whether the Apple Daily could continue to be published. She said that besides withdrawing from Demosistō, she would no longer participate in any international advocacy work, and she has not accepted any foreign media interviews.

== Arrest ==
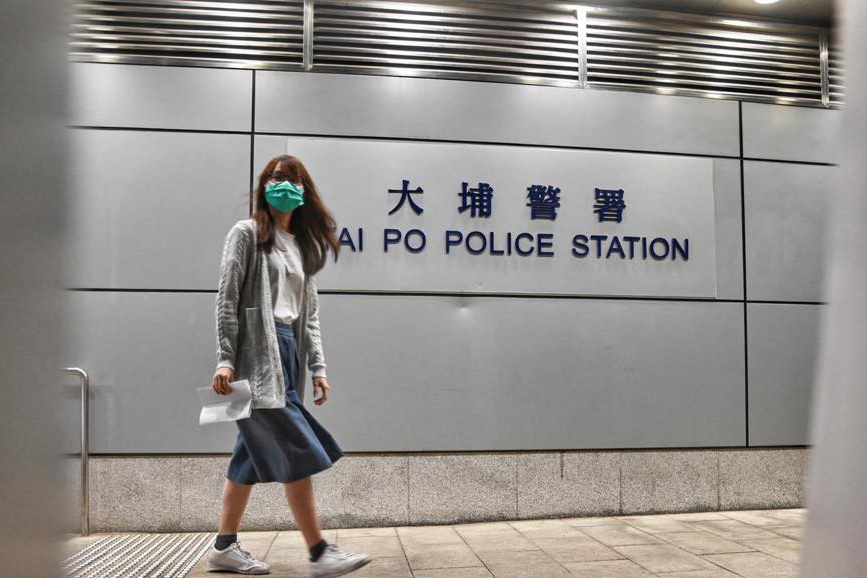
Agnes Chow is seen leaving the Tai Po Police Station after being detained for 24 hours on 11 August

On 9 August 2020, Chow said on her Facebook and Instagram accounts that a group of suspicious men gathered outside her house. Four of them left in a car after several hours before another 3-4 men arrived to replace them. They took photos of her apartment.

On the night of 10 August, after nine people including Jimmy Lai, the founder of Next Digital, were arrested by the National Security Department of the Hong Kong Police, a group of police officers arrived at Chow's residence. At home, her lawyer went to follow up and she was eventually arrested by the police. Shortly after her arrest, Senior Superintendent Li Kwai-wah of the National Security Department said during the meeting with reporters, that a total of 9 men and 1 woman, aged between 23 and 72 years old, were arrested on suspicion of colluding with foreign forces and conspiracy to commit fraud.

Chow's Facebook post said that she was arrested by the police on the charge of "inciting secession" under the national security law. The lawyer present stated that the police were searching her residence with a search warrant issued on 6 August.

On 11 August, Chow posted an update on her Facebook page, stating that she was still being detained at the Tai Po Police Station. On the previous night, when she was accompanied by a lawyer, a video interview was conducted. Chow's computer, mobile phone and promotion materials were also seized by the police that night.

At about 11 pm, after being detained for more than 24 hours, Chow was released on bail with a bail of HK$200,000 and a surety of HK$180,000. Her SAR passport was confiscated and she was ordered to report to the Tai Po Police Station on 1 September. Outside the police station that night, she was met by reporters, as well as activist Joshua Wong and Tiffany Yuen. She said that the arrest was "the most shocking time". She believed that the reason for the arrest was very vague and "unknown" to her arrest. She criticized the regime for using the national security law to suppress political dissidents. She also says during her detention she is empowered by the Keyakizaka46 song "Fukyouwaon".

The police have since claimed that Chow and others were running an organization that pressed for foreign sanctions against Hong Kong.

Chow then broadcast live on her YouTube channel on the next day after her release, recounting her arrest in Cantonese and Japanese, and sharing her thoughts. She pointed out that although the detention time was not very long, she felt very scared because if she was prosecuted under national security law, she would not be able to obtain bail. She also revealed that she was very happy to learn that Apple Daily had printed 550,000 copies, and she urged Japanese people to pay attention to the situation in Hong Kong. The live broadcast was supported by a large number of Japanese netizens.

On 1 September, Chow reported to the Tai Po Police Station as part of her bail conditions. She said that she was only told to take another statement after arriving at the police station at about 3 pm. When she left the police station in the evening, she stated that the police asked her to report to the police station again on 2 December. She said that she "hoped to be released on bail safely" and to spend her birthday in freedom. However, because Chow was sentenced to prison for her unlawful assembly charges on 2 December, she could not report to the police station as she was remanded in custody.

On 3 August 2021, Chow reported to the Tai Po Police Station as part of her bail conditions for the first time after she was released on her unlawful assembly charges. There were no reporters present outside the police station. After leaving the police station, she did not speak to the media and left without comment.

== Reactions ==
=== Netizens ===
After netizens heard that Chow was arrested, many netizens called Chow as 'the real Mulan' on Twitter, praising for her bravery, and voiced their intention to boycott the movie Mulan starring Chinese-American actor Liu Yifei, which was expected to be released in September of the same year.

=== Japan ===
The news of Chow's arrest has drawn significant attention in Japan. In addition to becoming a breaking news in major Japanese media, some Japanese netizens also launched hashtags such as #FreeAgnes, #周庭氏の逮捕に抗議する on the social media Twitter to express their dissatisfaction with Chow's arrest by the Hong Kong police and demanded for her release.

Chief Cabinet Secretary Yoshihide Suga expressed deep concern about the arrest of Chow and others. Foreign minister Toshimitsu Motegi said that Japan's over Hong Kong were getting stronger. A Japanese cross-party group affiliated with IPAC, Japan Parliamentary Alliance on China (JPAC), held an emergency press conference in the House of Representatives, stating that it cannot accept that the Hong Kong government violated the freedom of thought and speech with the National Security Law. In addition, the Chairman of the Communist Party of Japan Kazuo Shii stated that the Hong Kong police's aggressive arrest of Chow and others has nothing to do with socialism, but pure human rights oppression. A member of House of Councillors Akira Koike even pointed out that the arrest of Chow was a major human rights violation because it is not just a domestic issue, but an international issue. He called for the withdrawal of the National Security Law. Taiga Ishikawa, a member of Constitutional Democratic Party of Japan, shared the news of Chow's arrest on Twitter, saying that he would continue to do his utmost to safeguard Hong Kong's free and democratic stance.

A Japanese singer-songwriter Tavito Nanao released a song called "Free" to protest the Hong Kong police's arrest of Chow and other Hong Kong democrats on suspicion of violating the National Security Law. He wrote that "the progress of human rights suppression are faster than I thought, I believe I can no longer perform in China, and I can no longer see Chinese friends."

=== Taiwan ===
The youth wing of the Democratic Progressive Party stated through a Facebook post that the 23-year-old Hong Kong young female named Chow was arrested, representing Hong Kong's freedom and democracy has gradually disappeared, and this kind of abuse of power arrests and searches also proves that the Chinese government has promised to remain unchanged for 50 years through "One country, two systems" is just a hoax.

Taiwanese actress Ili Cheng wrote that she expressed her concern through social networking sites. In her thoughts, she wrote "Pray for all peace."

=== France ===
In its issue on 20 August 2020, iconic political news weekly in France, Le Point, published an image of Joshua Wong and Chow on the front cover, with the heading Les derniers jours de Hong Kong (The Last Days of Hong Kong).

== See also ==
- Apple Daily raids and arrests
- 709 crackdown
- Hong Kong 47
