= Apple Daily raids and arrests =

Police raid on Hong Kong pro-democracy newspaper

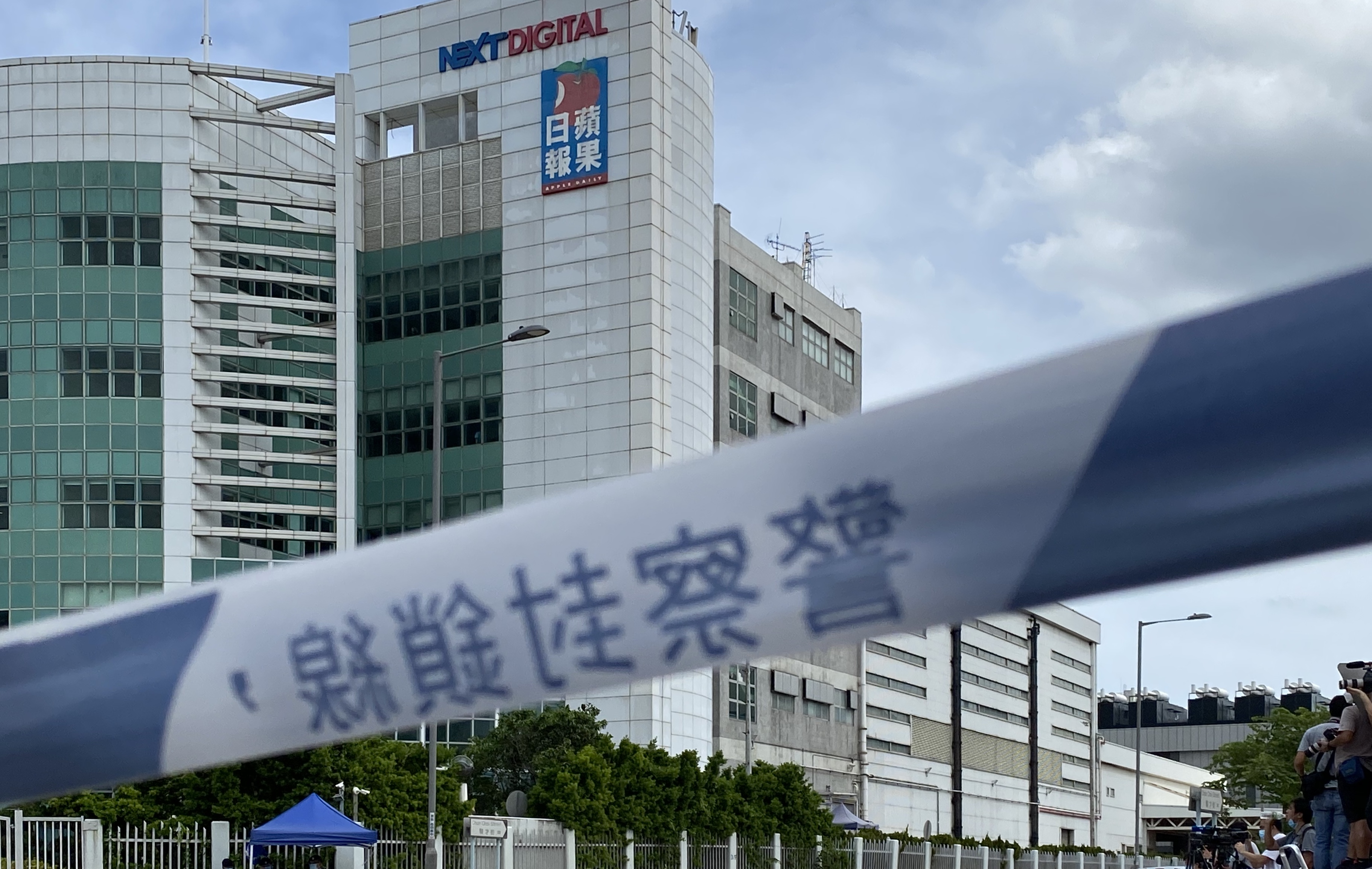
- A police cordon outside the Next Digital building on 10 August 2020
- Native name: 警方國安處搜查《蘋果日報》
- Date: 10 August 2020 & 17 June 2021
- Location: Tseung Kwan O Industrial Estate, New Territories, Hong Kong; 22.2861116°N 114.2740238°E
- Target: Executives of Next Digital and Apple Daily
- Outcome: Apple Daily ceased operation on 24 June 2021 due to capital frozen by the authorities
- Charges: Collusion with foreign forces, defraud

The offices of Apple Daily, once the largest pro-democracy newspaper in Hong Kong, and its parent company, Next Digital, were raided and executives arrested by the Hong Kong Police Force on 10 August 2020 and again on 17 June 2021. Some of the arrested and three companies of Next Digital were charged under the Hong Kong national security law. The 26-year-old newspaper was forced to close in June 2021 following the raids and freezing of its capital.

== Background ==
=== National Security Law ===
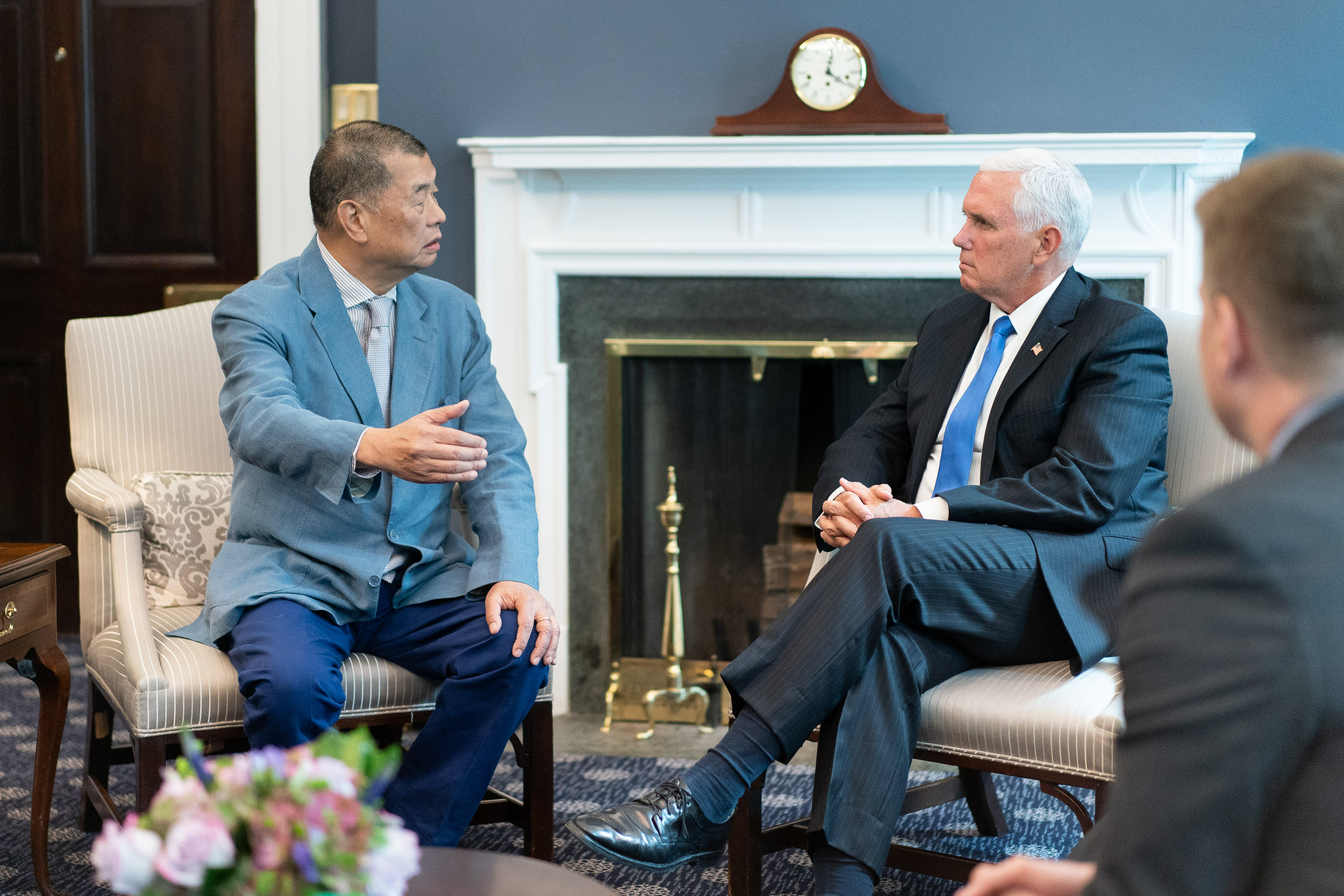
Jimmy Lai in July 2019 during a meeting with U.S. Vice President Mike Pence regarding Hong Kong's pro-democracy protest, which was accused by pro-Beijing camp as colluding with foreign forces

Before Hong Kong national security law was imposed by the Beijing Government and officially promulgated by the Hong Kong Government on 30 June 2020, Jimmy Lai, the founder of Next Digital, was rumoured to be a target under the new law. Lai insisted on not leaving Hong Kong; during two interviews on 16 and 29 June he said that he was expecting to be jailed. He also vowed to fight until the last moment.

== First raid ==
=== Events ===
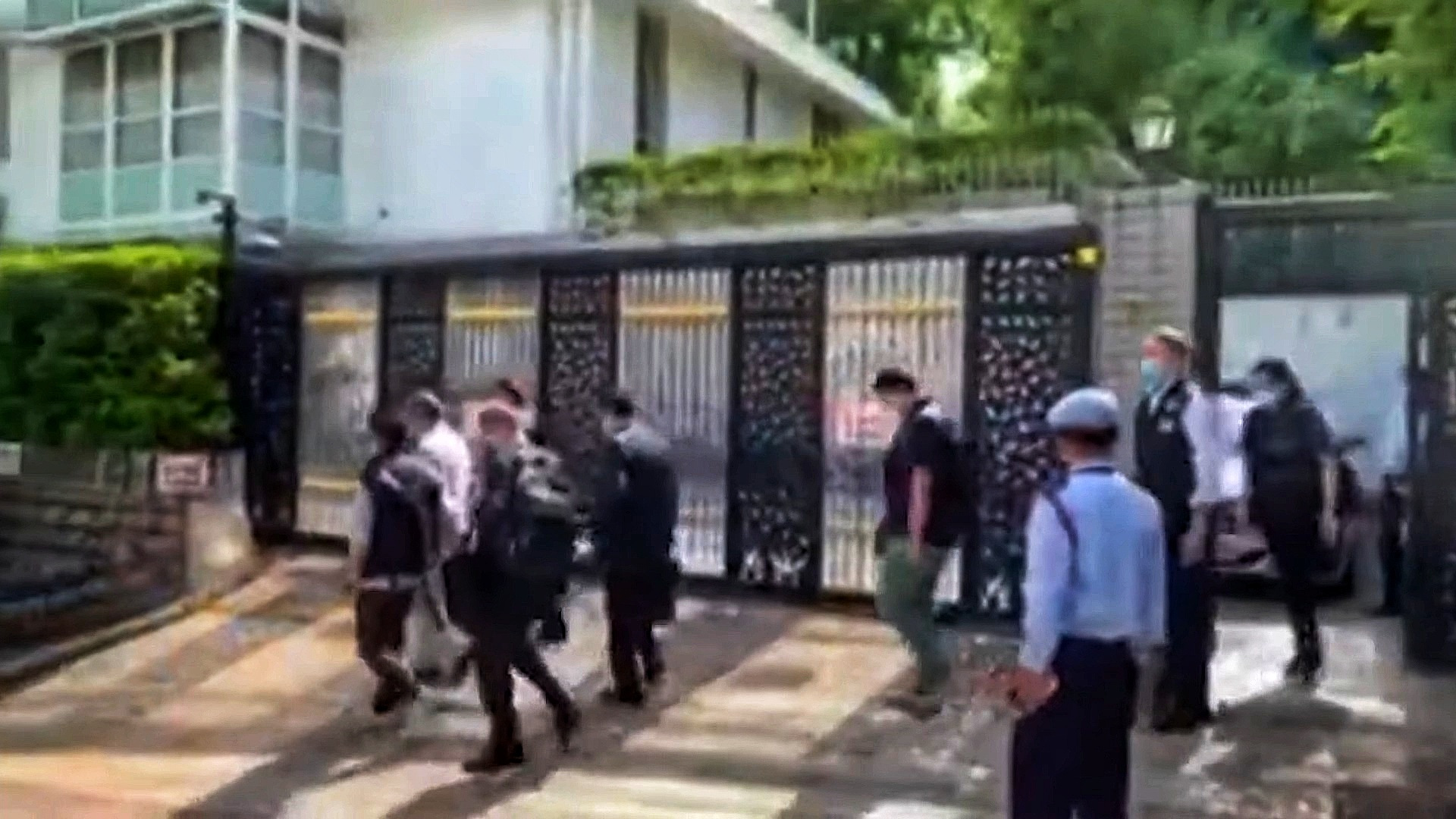
Lai (second left, wearing white) was arrested in Homantin residence at 10 am on 10 August.

In the morning on 10 August 2020, the National Security Department of the Hong Kong Police Force arrested founder of Next Digital Jimmy Lai. Four senior management staff of the company, CEO Cheung Kim-hung, CFO Royston Chow Tat-kuen, Administrative Director Wong Wai-keung, and Animation Director Ng Tat-kwong, were arrested on suspicion on conspiracy to commit fraud, while Chow was also with the suspicion of collusion with foreign forces under the National Security Law. Two sons of Lai were arrested also under the suspicion of collusion with foreign forces. Mark Simon, the adviser to Lai who was not in Hong Kong, was reportedly wanted by the police. He later confirmed on Twitter that Lai had been arrested under the national security law.

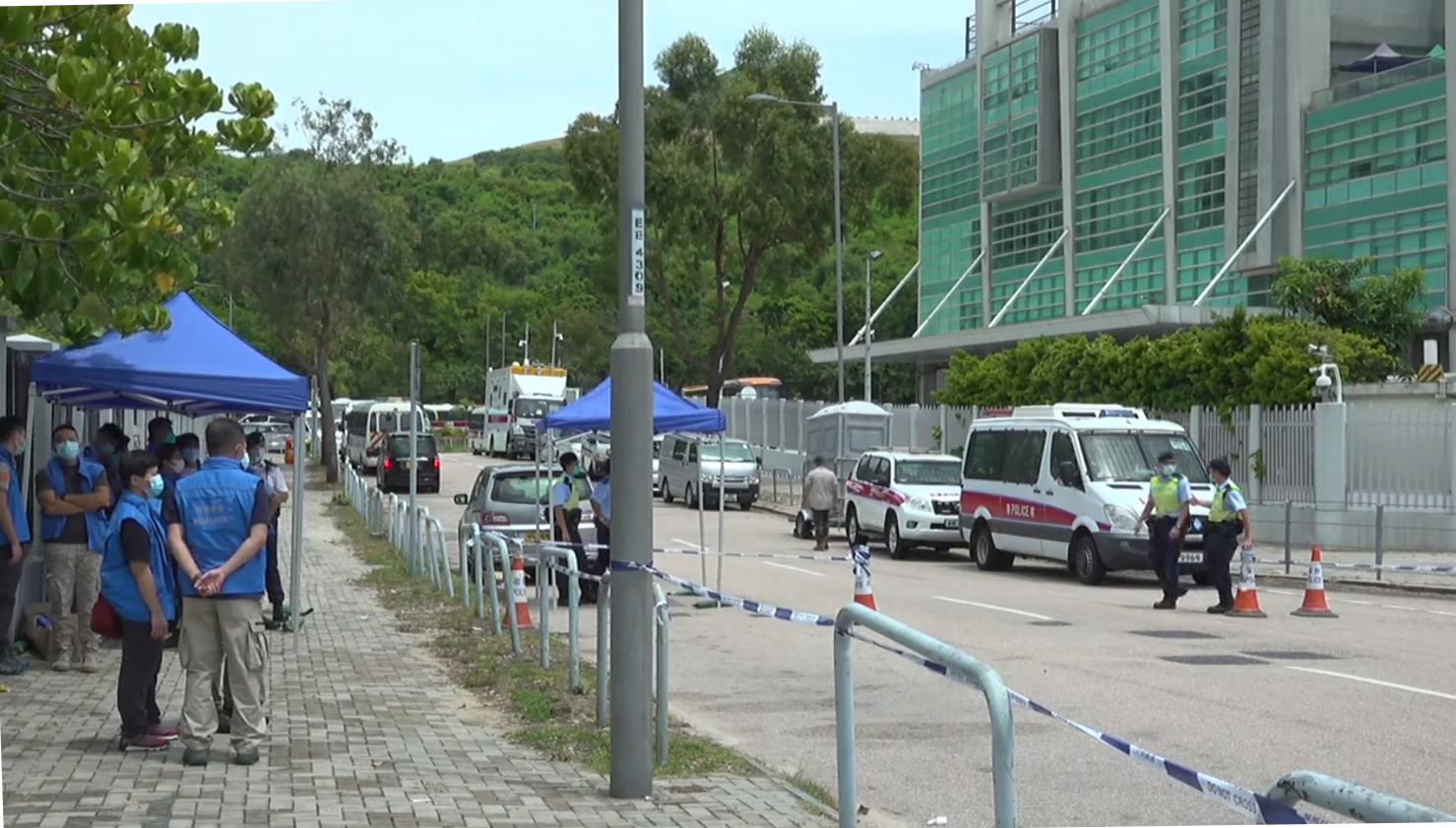
Police waiting outside the office of Apple Daily

Nearly 200 police cordoned, raided, and searched the headquarters of Next Digital and Apple Daily in Tseung Kwan O Industrial Estate at 10 am after making arrests. Ryan Law Wai-kwong, editor-in-Chief of Apple Daily, asked the cops to show the search warrant issued by the court. Apple Daily said such request was ignored, but the Police Force later rejected such claim. The administrative Department of Apple Daily called the staff not to come to work due to unexpected situations. Some journalists were prevented from picturing the office desk by the police, while those at the office had their personal information taken by the police. It was said the departments of local news, breaking news and finance news were raided.

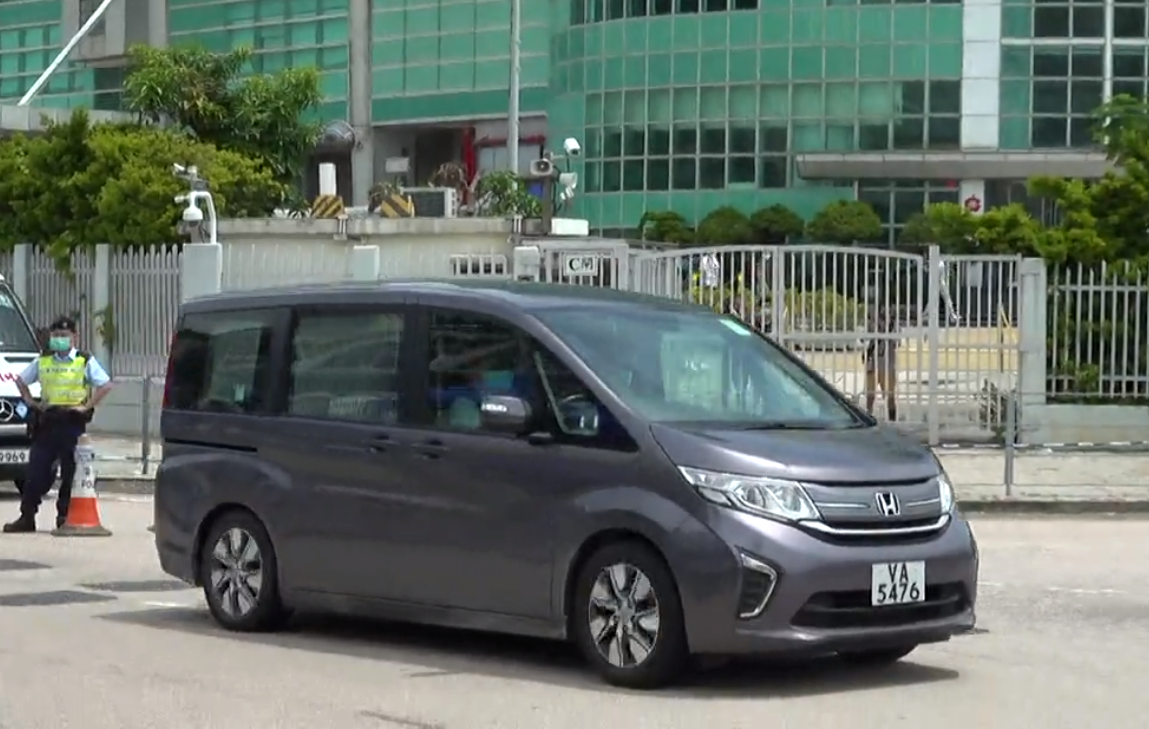
Lai was brought away by the police at around 1 pm.

Handcuffed Lai was brought to the office at around 11 am. Chan Pui-man, Associate Publisher of Apple Daily, and Law insisted to monitor the raid and argued that the search warrant did not cover the news material, which was echoed by Steve Li Kwai-wah from the National Security Department, although the police took away the materials and threatened to arrest two with suspicion of obstructing police officers. Cheung, also handcuffed, arrived at noon. Lawyers were permitted to reach Lai and Cheung after negotiations with the police. Editors while working and reporters were asked to leave the office, blocked from taking photos of Cheung, and were stopped from entering the editing department of the office.

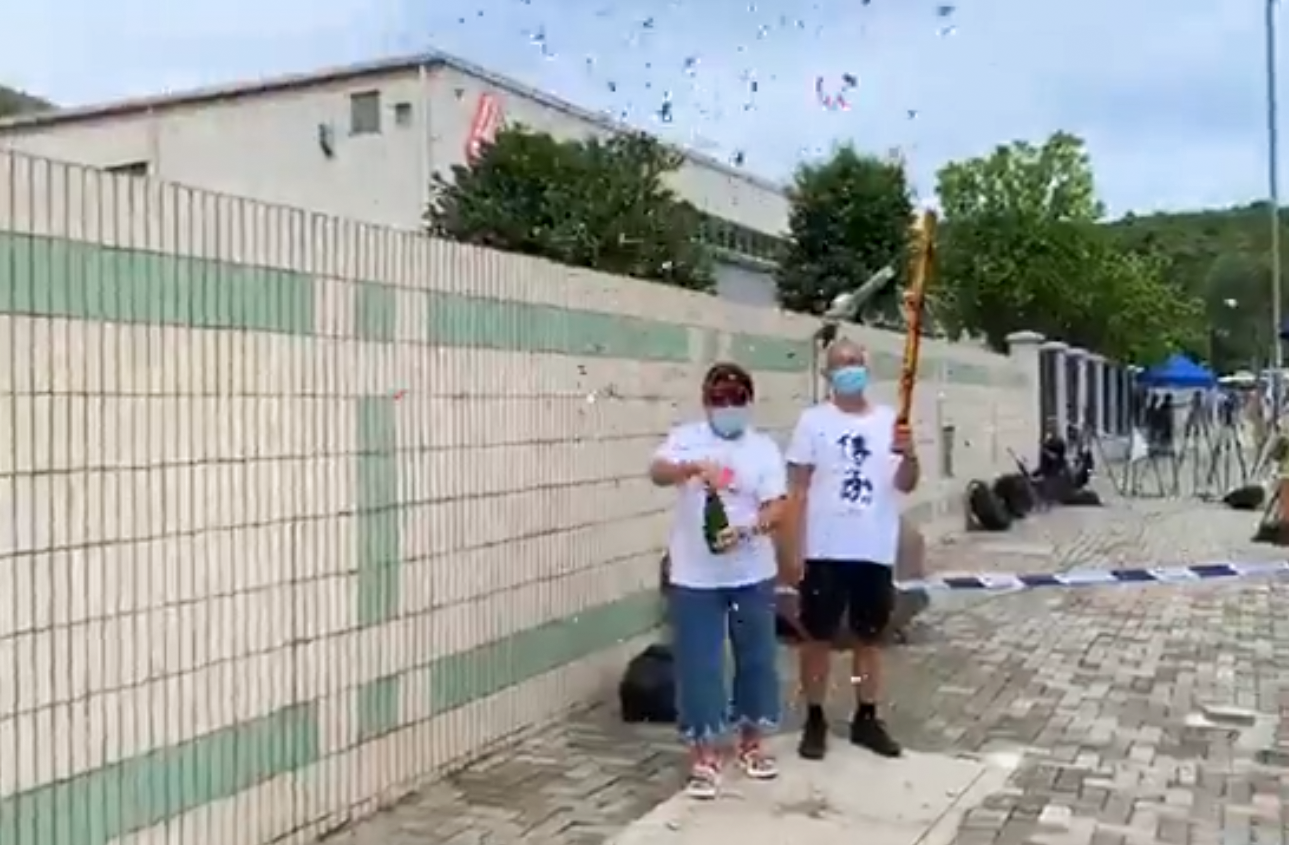
Fu Chun-chung, pro-Beijing activist, celebrated the arrest of Lai outside the office at around 3 pm.

Lai and Cheung left the office at around 1 pm following three-hour raid in the office. Computers, mobile phones, details of the exiled activists and other evidences were said to be taken away. Some pro-Beijing activists celebrated the raid outside the office.

Controversies stirred as local and international reporters from RTHK, Stand News, Inmedia, AFP and Reuters were not allowed to enter press area, while media said to be pro-government were allowed in.

On the same day, Hong Kong police also arrested three activists: Agnes Chow, Wilson Li Chung-chak and Andy Li Yu-hin, and sent three officers with a court order to the Hong Kong office of The Nikkei who ran an advert paid for by pro-democracy activists in 2019.

=== Reactions ===
The unprecedented raid caused widespread controversy in the international community.

==== Hong Kong ====
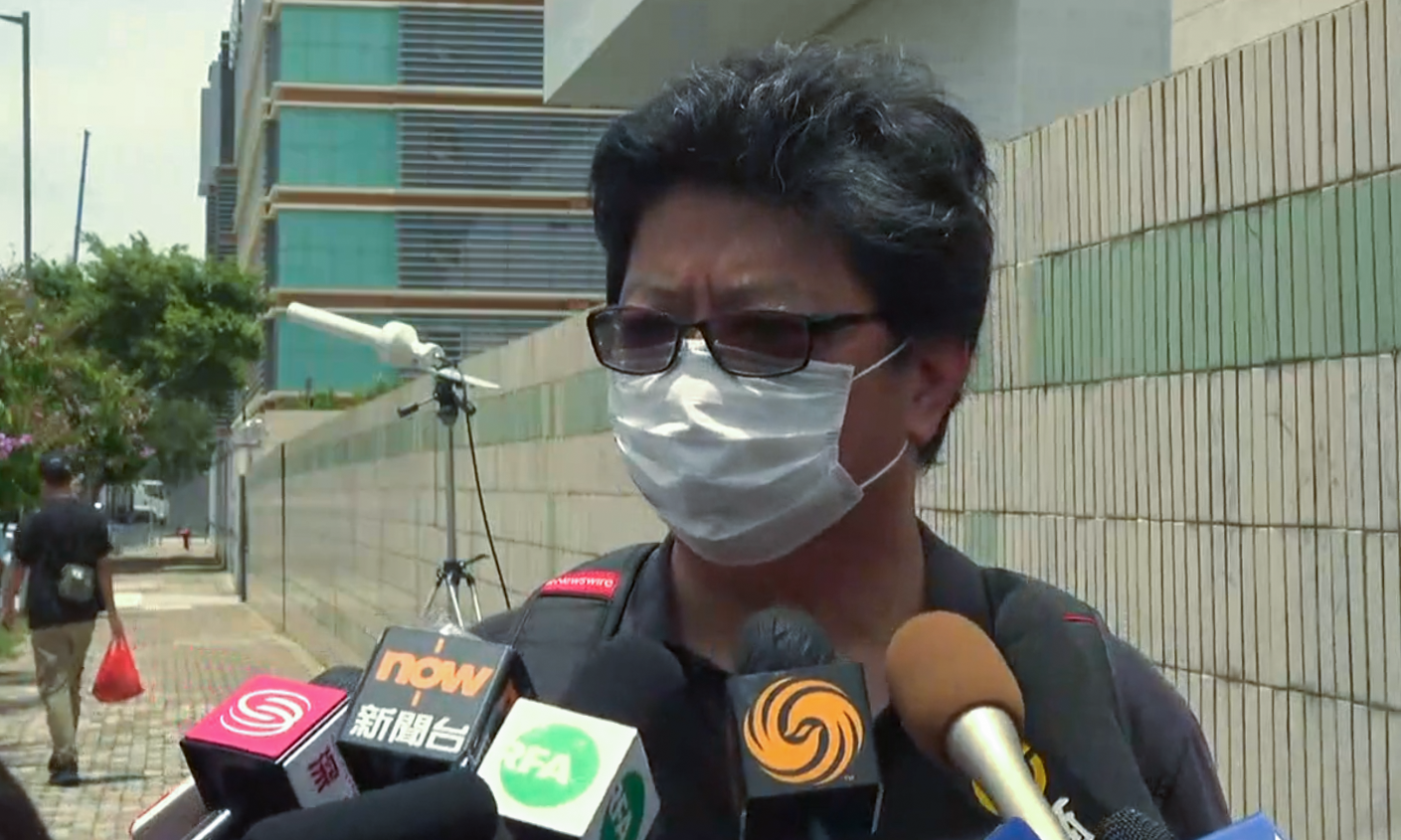
Hong Kong Journalists Association Yeung Kin-hing was interviewed following the raid.

- Chairman of Hong Kong Journalists Association Yeung Kin-hing described the raid as destroying press freedom in Hong Kong, shaping white terror in the city only to be seen in the Third World.
- The Next Digital Trade Union strongly condemned police operation saying it was extremely rare and severe in the history of Hong Kong. The Union criticized the search of news material as an abuse of power and to harass news media, and vowed to guard the post.
- Foreign Correspondents' Club stated the operation eroded the reputation of Hong Kong and signaled the end of press freedom in Hong Kong.
- Several groups from the media released joint statement, urging the police to elaborate on the aim and legal basis of this operation, or else the operation shall be suspended immediately.
- 22 Pro-democracy legislators strongly denounced the police as intimidating the media. Now-exiled former legislator Nathan Law described the arrest operation as "crazy".
- Pro-Beijing DAB and FTU supported the police operation as to guard the national security.

==== People's Republic of China ====
- Hong Kong and Macau Affairs Office of the State Council firmly supported Hong Kong Police's operation and criticized Lai as a foreign political agent.
- Spokesman of Ministry of Foreign Affairs Zhao Lijian insisted China to be a society with rule of law, and supported the action by the Government of HKSAR.
- Editor-in-chief of Global Times, Hu Xijin, said in Weibo that Lai was obviously a hanjian, and described the sanctions from the United States as "a rotten egg hitting the rock".

==== Taiwan ====
- President Tsai Ing-wen strongly denounced the Hong Kong government of damaging press freedom, rule-of-law, human rights, and democracy, leading to a chilling effect within the media industry.
- The Mainland Affairs Council denounced the "evil" actions by the Hong Kong government, believing such acts would only shame the international image of CCP and Hong Kong.
- Premier Su Tseng-chang urged CCP to keep the promise of 50-year pledge.

==== United Kingdom ====
- The Prime Minister, Boris Johnson said the arrest of Next Digital Group founder Jimmy Lai showed that the Hong Kong National Security Law is being used to silence opposition voices and reaffirms that Hong Kong must protect the rights and freedoms of Hong Kong people.
- Nigel Adams, Secretary of State for Asia at the UK Foreign Office, tweeted his deep concern over the arrest of Jimmy Lai and others.
- Former Governor Chris Patten said to Hong Kong Watch that the arrest of Jimmy Lai on charges of colluding with foreign powers was "yet another serious crackdown on Hong Kong's freedoms and way of life, and the most outrageous attack on Hong Kong's remaining freedom of the press in living memory."

==== United States ====
- In a tweet, U.S. Vice President Mike Pence described the arrest as offensive. Pence tweeted that the arrest of Jimmy Lai was "an affront to freedom-loving people around the world. He recalled his meeting with Lai at the White House and said he was encouraged by his insistence on democracy, rights and Beijing's commitment to giving Hong Kong people autonomy. And he said, "The United States will continue to stand with Jimmy Lai and all freedom-loving people of Hong Kong.
- U.S. Secretary of State Mike Pompeo said the arrests proved that the Chinese government had "deprived" Hong Kong of its freedom. Pompeo tweeted, "I am deeply troubled by reports that Hong Kong arrested Jimmy Lai under the draconian national security law.", "Further proof that the Chinese Communist Party has already deprived Hong Kong of its freedoms and eroded the rights of its people.
- In a tweet, Florida Senator Rick Scott criticized the Chinese Communist Party for allegedly continuing to "silence and intimidate" those who speak out for democracy and human rights, adding that the Hong Kong national security law is a tool that directly infringes on Hong Kong's freedom and autonomy.
- Although Lai's pro-Trump position was shared by many in the Hong Kong pro-democracy camp, as well as Apple Daily, many democracy experts in the United States believe the position was the main reason the why Hong Kong's national security law was passed, and probably was one of the factors that led to the 2021 U.S. Capitol insurrection.

==== Others ====
- Lead spokesperson for the external affairs of European Union Peter Stano and High Representative for Foreign Affairs Josep Borrell released statements respectively, saying the latest actions were worrying.
- United Nations High Commissioner for Human Rights Michelle Bachelet called for the review of the National Security Law by Hong Kong authorities.
- Chief Cabinet Secretary of Japan Yoshihide Suga express his deep concern to the arrest of Lai and Agnes Chow.
- Committee to Protect Journalists said the arrest of Lai was a proof of the suppressed press freedom in Hong Kong.
- World Association of Newspapers and World Editors Forum strongly protested the arrest of Jimmy Lai, worrying such could worsen the self-censorship and suppress critical news report in the city.
- Secretary-general Christophe Deloire of Reporters Without Borders protested Hong Kong Police's decision to arrest Jimmy Lai, stating the charge of colluding foreign forces on Lai was an attempt to outlaw the symbol of press freedom, and urged the Hong Kong Government to drop all charges and immediately release the arrested.
- International Federation of Journalists was shocked about the arrest of Jimmy Lai. IFJ said Lai should be released immediately and all charges should be dropped.

=== Effects ===
==== Volatile stock ====
Following the news of Jimmy Lai arrested spread in the city, the stock of Next Digital was volatile as pledge to buy the stock emerged at the online forums. The stock plunged more than 15% after Lai arrested, but then surged nearly 280% in the afternoon, becoming the stock with the best performance in the day. The stock price, at peak, accumulated more than 2,000% of increase in 3 days only, but then plunged again.

Police arrested 15 people on suspicion of fraud and money-laundering on 10 September, insisting that the arrest operation only targeted the scam taking advantage of the Next Digital incident instead of the company.

==== Purchase of newspaper ====
Apple Daily supporters called for buying newspaper as to show support to the newspaper. The newspaper printed 350,000 copies for 11 August edition, and later raised the number to 550,000 in the early morning of the day, which is significantly higher than the normally 70,000 copies. Queues were seen at the newspaper stalls.

== Second raid ==
=== Events ===
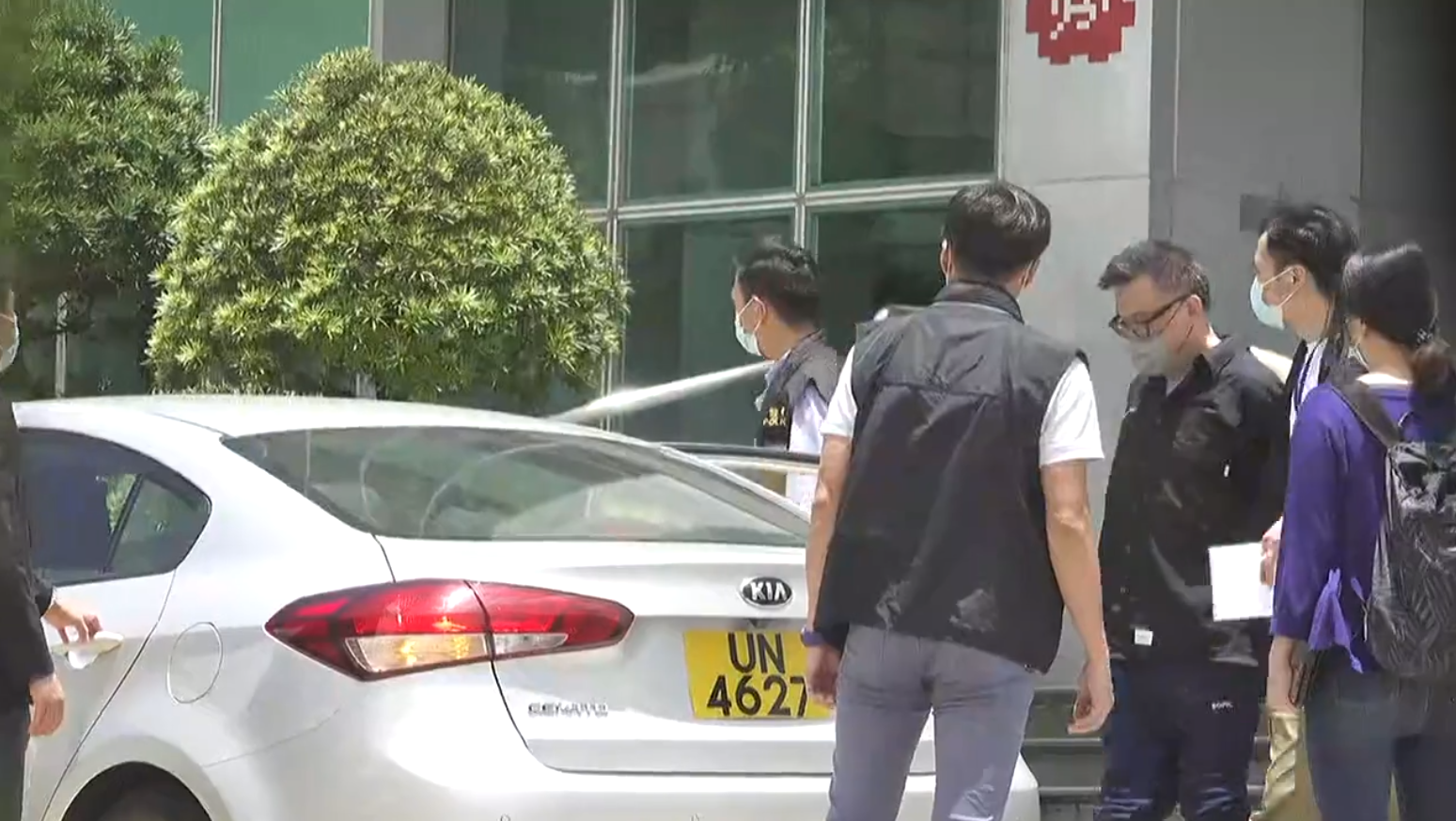
Cheung Chi-wai was taken away by police after searching for evidence.

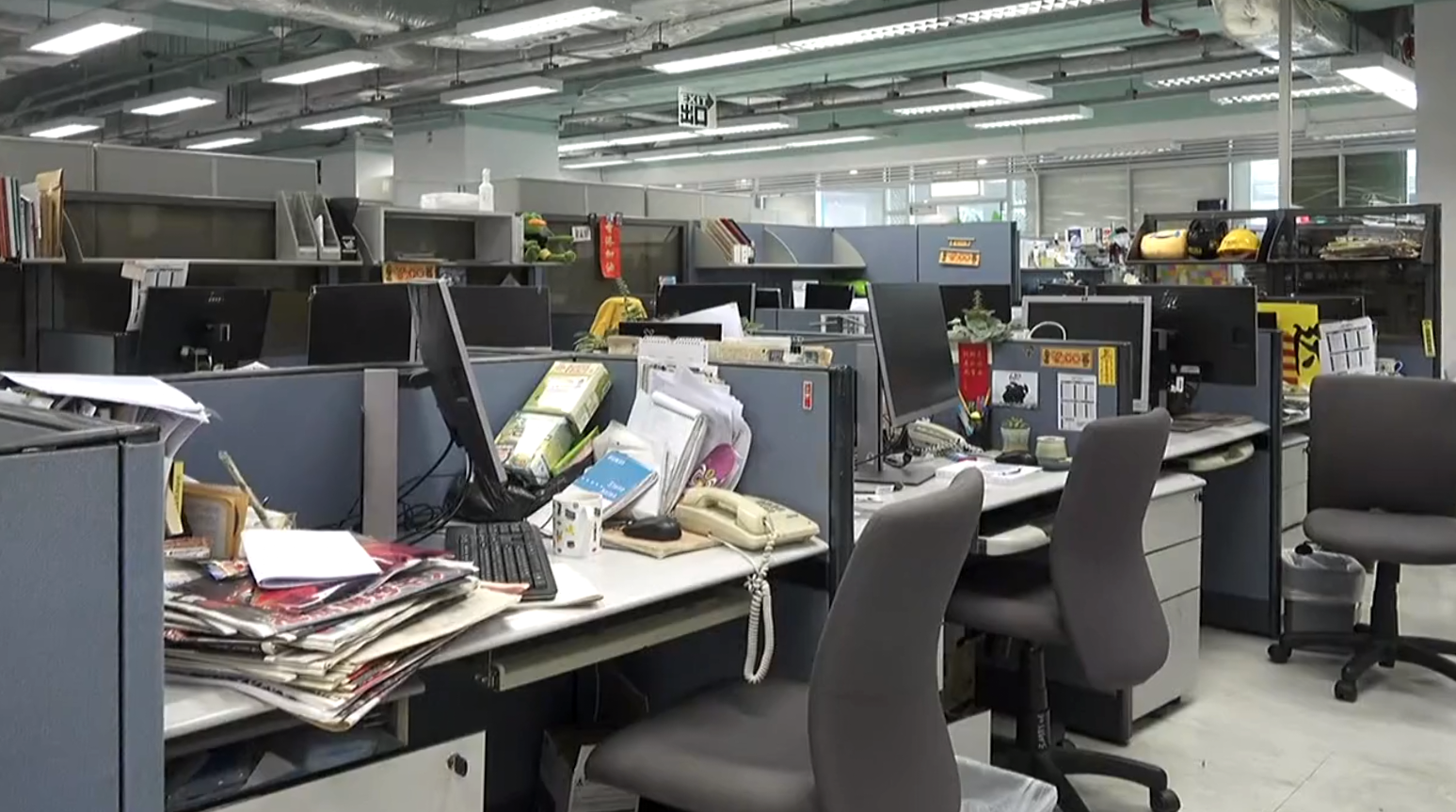
Inside one of the reporter desk after police raid

In the morning on 17 June 2021, the National Security Department of the Hong Kong Police Force arrested five Next Digital executives. They included the company's CEO Cheung Kim-hung, COO Royston Chow Tat-kuen, Apple Daily editor-in-chief Ryan Law, vice-president Chan Pui-man, and Next Animation Studio chief executive director Cheung Chi-wai. Around 500 police officers and National Security Department officers went straight to the Apple Daily headquarters in Tseung Kwan O Industrial Estate, blocking off the building and all exits. All staff and persons entering the building must register with ID cards and staff cards, and are also required providing personal information such as telephone number and address, Li Kwai-wah, a senior Superintendent of the National Security Department of the police, also came to investigate. A police officer wearing a black vest at the scene said that after registration, all employees returning to the building could only leave or go to the restaurant on the 5th floor, and cannot enter other areas of the building. They also pointed out that they were searching for evidence at the scene to prevent reporters from returning to work, and that shooting was prohibited.

==== Police asked reporter to leave the desk ====
When the police arrived, there were about 20 employees in the Apple Daily building, including several reporters and cleaners. The police asked everyone to lay down their work and gather in the lobby on the second floor. The police then registered their ID cards and then asked them to stop work and leave, the reporter was asked to go to the staff restaurant on the 5th floor. During the period, a number of police officers randomly searched the documents on the reporter's desk and opened the cabinet, and asked the reporter to testify. However, the reporter claimed that the company lawyer could only read the documents after the company's lawyer arrived, and refused to assist in the search for evidence. The police officer immediately called the reporter to sit down. Low, and there was no positive response as to whether the evidence search will begin after the lawyer arrives. An agent turned on the reporter's computer to search for information. At present, all reporters in the building have been asked to leave the editorial department and wait in the underground space or on the 5th floor. They were unable to enter and exit the building freely. Police officers stepped forward to stop them. The reporter used a camcorder to film police officers during the search. It is reported that an employee's company phone placed on the desk on the second floor had a record of "being online" at 8 o'clock in the morning.

==== Police arrests executives and searched the materials ====
The Information Services Department stated at 7:24 am that the National Security Department arrested five company directors of the Apple Daily this morning on suspicion of violating the National Security Law. The 5 persons, including 4 men and 1 woman, aged between 47 and 63, were suspected of violating Article 29 of the Hong Kong National Security Law, for conspiracy to colluding with foreign forces. The police also went to the arrested person's residence. Five people have been detained for investigation. At 8:07 am, it stated that the National Security Department executed a court warrant issued by the court in accordance with Article 43(1) of the Hong Kong National Security Law and Schedule 1 of the Implementation Rules this morning to search a media organization in Tseung Kwan O. The search warrant granted the police the power to search including news materials. The purpose of the operation was to search evidence for a suspected violation of the National Security Law.

==== Police searched two arrested executives residence ====
The five arrested persons are CEO of Next Digital Cheung Kim-hung, COO Chow Tat-kuen, vice president of Apple Daily Chan Pui-man, editor-in-chief Ryan Law and chief executive director Cheung Chi-wai. Several police officers arrived at Kornhill before 7 am. About half an hour later, Ryan Law was taken away from the apartment. At that time, his hands were handcuffed. In addition, some media said that Chan Pui-man's residence was forcibly "exploded" by the police. Inside, the search lasted two and a half hours, and two electronic devices that did not belong to Chan were taken away, including two laptop computers and a tablet computer. They were taken to Tseung Kwan O Police Station, Chai Wan Police Station and Cheung Sha Wan Police Station to assist in the investigation. By 9 am, Cheung and Law were taken away from the police station. They were then taken by a private car to the Apple Daily building to search for evidence. The lawyers was also present to find out. When Cheung and Law were brought into the building, their hands were locked in handcuffs. Nearly 10:30 am, Cheung, Chow, and Chan were taken back to the Apple Daily headquarters by police.

==== NSD freezes Apple Daily-related assets ====
Senior Superintendent Li Kwai-wah of the National Security Department explained the incident at 11 a.m., said that more than 500 police forces were used in the operation this morning. The police had frozen the assets of three companies, including Apple Daily, Apple Printing and AD Internet Limited totaling HK$18 million. Since 2019, Apple Daily has contained dozens of articles calling for foreign sanctions against the CCP and the SAR government. The five arrested people are very important to the company's operations. They are responsible for the content style and policy of the article, and it is not ruled out that some people will be arrested. catch. At about 12 noon, 2 Apple Daily executives and 3 journalists were taken away from the headquarters. Editor-in-chief Ryan Law was taken to the North Point Police Station for investigation, and Next Media CEO Cheung Kim-hung was taken there Cheung Sha Wan Police Station; COO Chow Tat-kuen was first taken to Aberdeen Police Station, and then transferred to Western Police Station for detainment. Vice President Chan Pui-man was taken to Tseung Kwan O Police Station; after chief executive director Cheung Chi-wai left the building, he was taken to Wong Tai Sin Police Station. The police will seize documents and materials in the Apple Daily headquarters, including at least 44 computers, containing a large amount of news materials. In addition, they will seize more than a large number of past newspapers from the newspaper's library. The dates involved are from January 2017 to that day. These exhibits were put into a number of blue plastic boxes, and then the police officers moved the plastic boxes to a secret truck parked downstairs to take them away. At about 1:15 pm, the police raided the Apple Daily headquarters for more than 5 hours and then collected the team and left.

==== Gallery ====
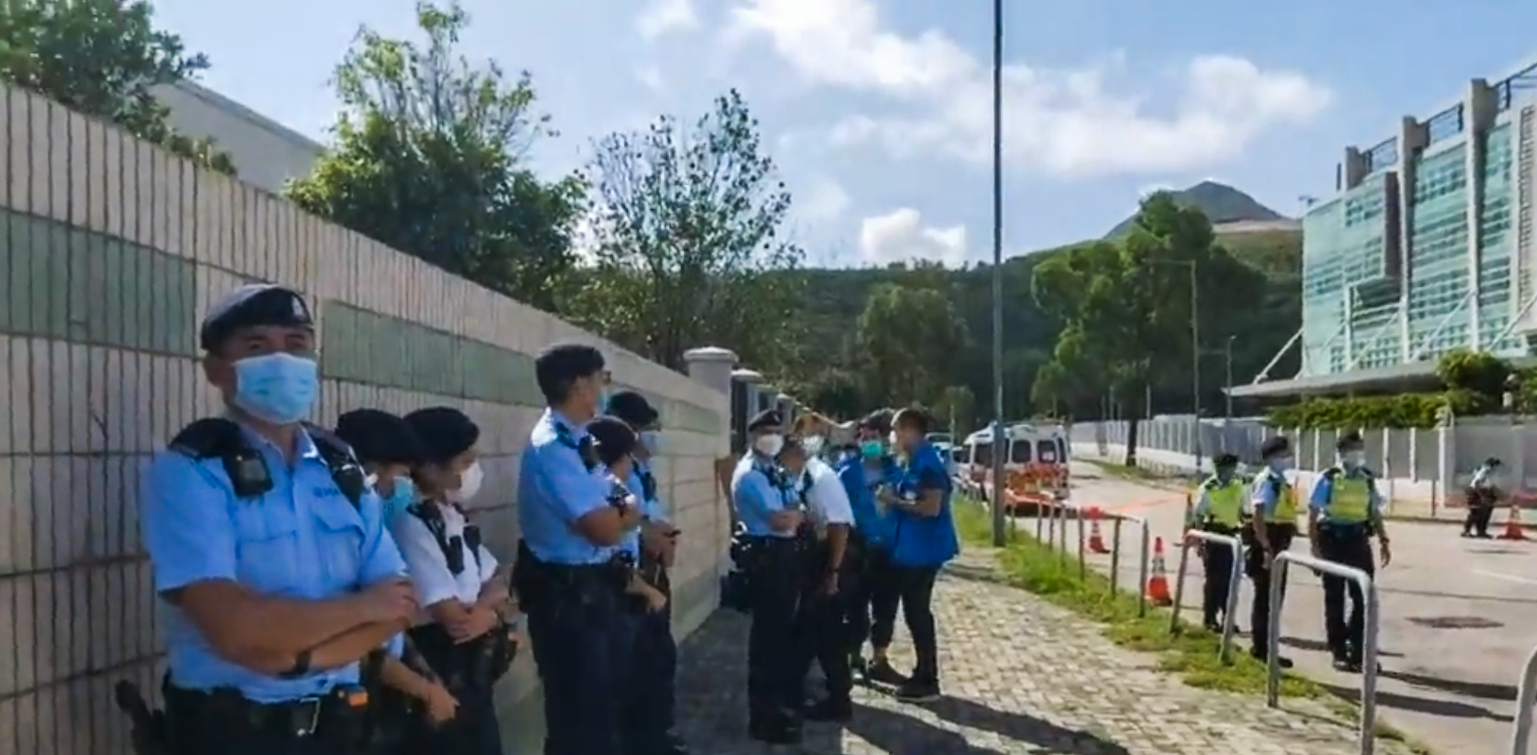
A number of police officers are seen guarding outside the Apple Daily building.

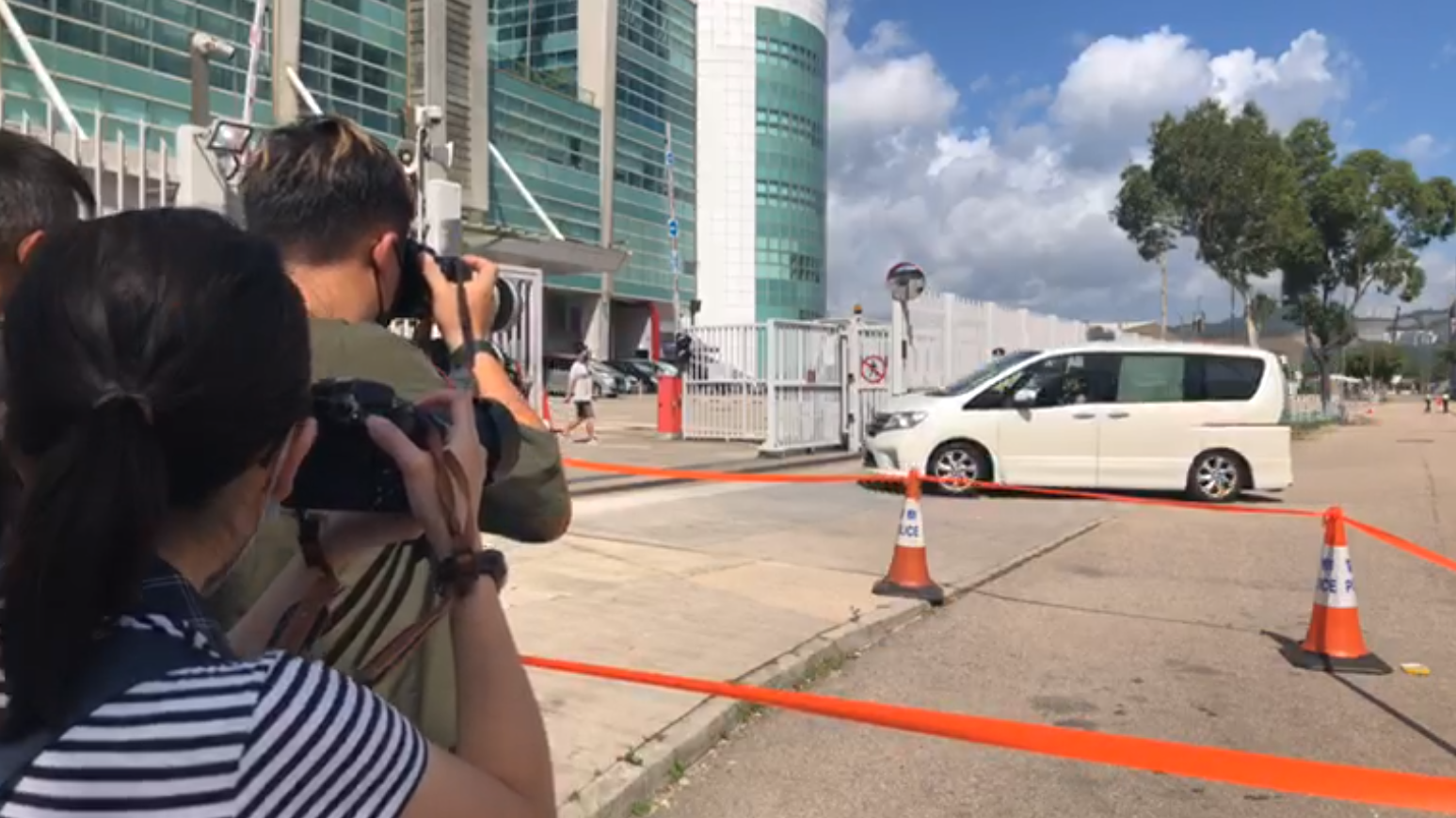
The arrested director of Apple Daily arrived at the building in a police car to search for evidence.

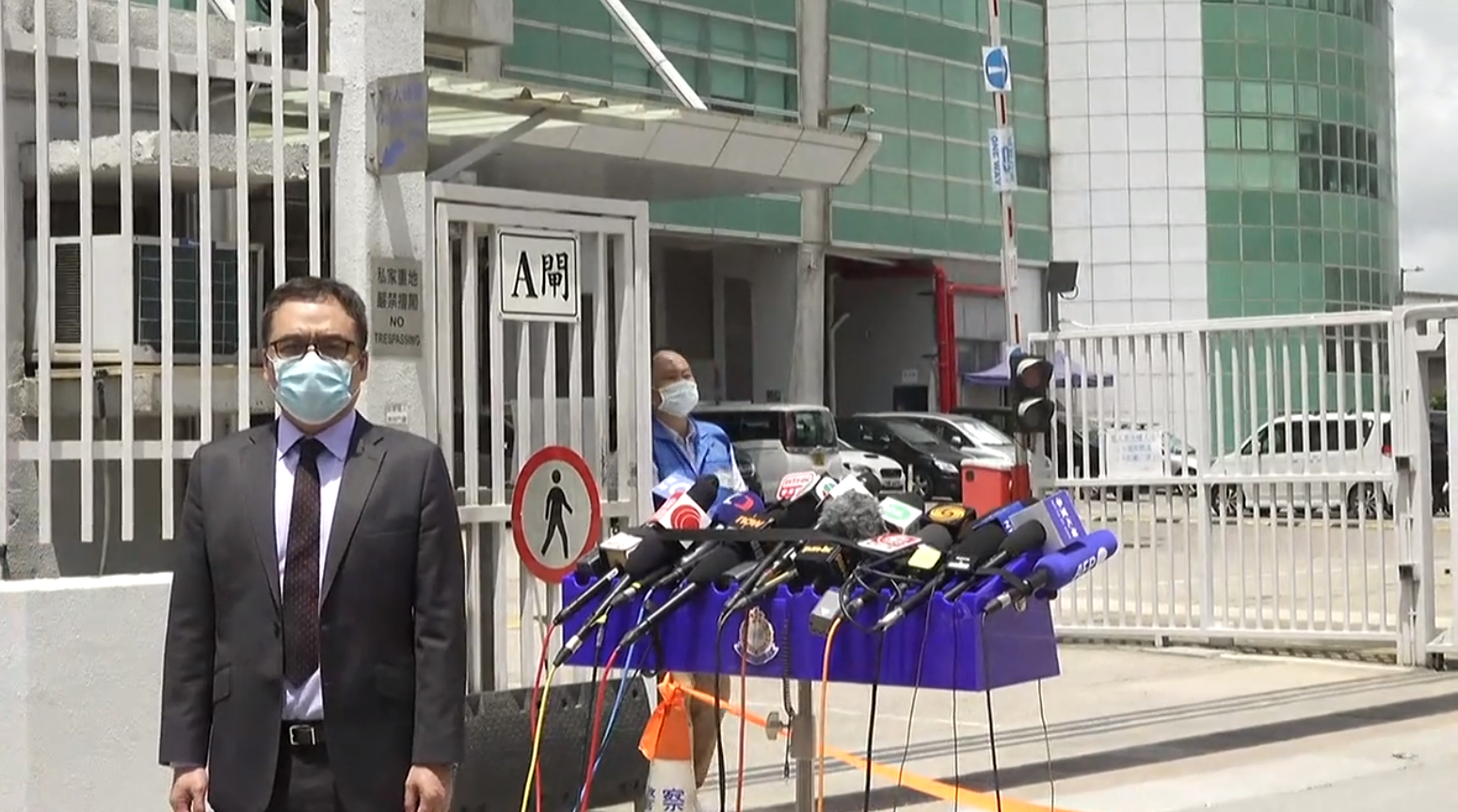
Senior Superintendent of the National Security Department Li Kwai-wah meets with the media outside the Apple Daily headquarters.

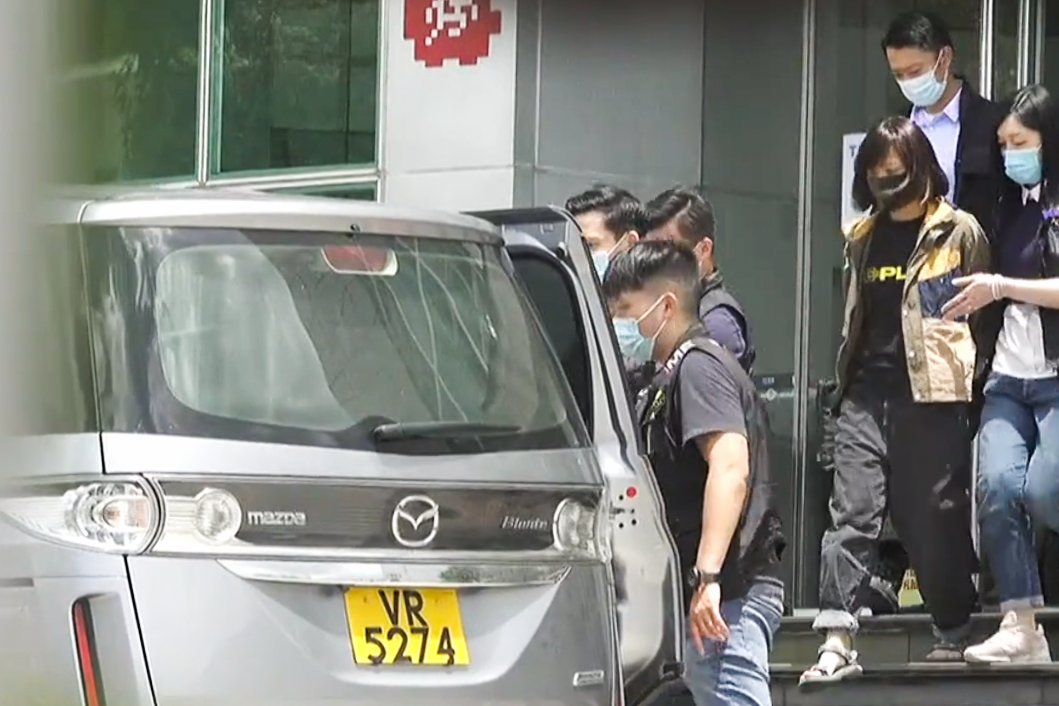
Apple Daily vice-president Chan Pui-man was taken away by police.

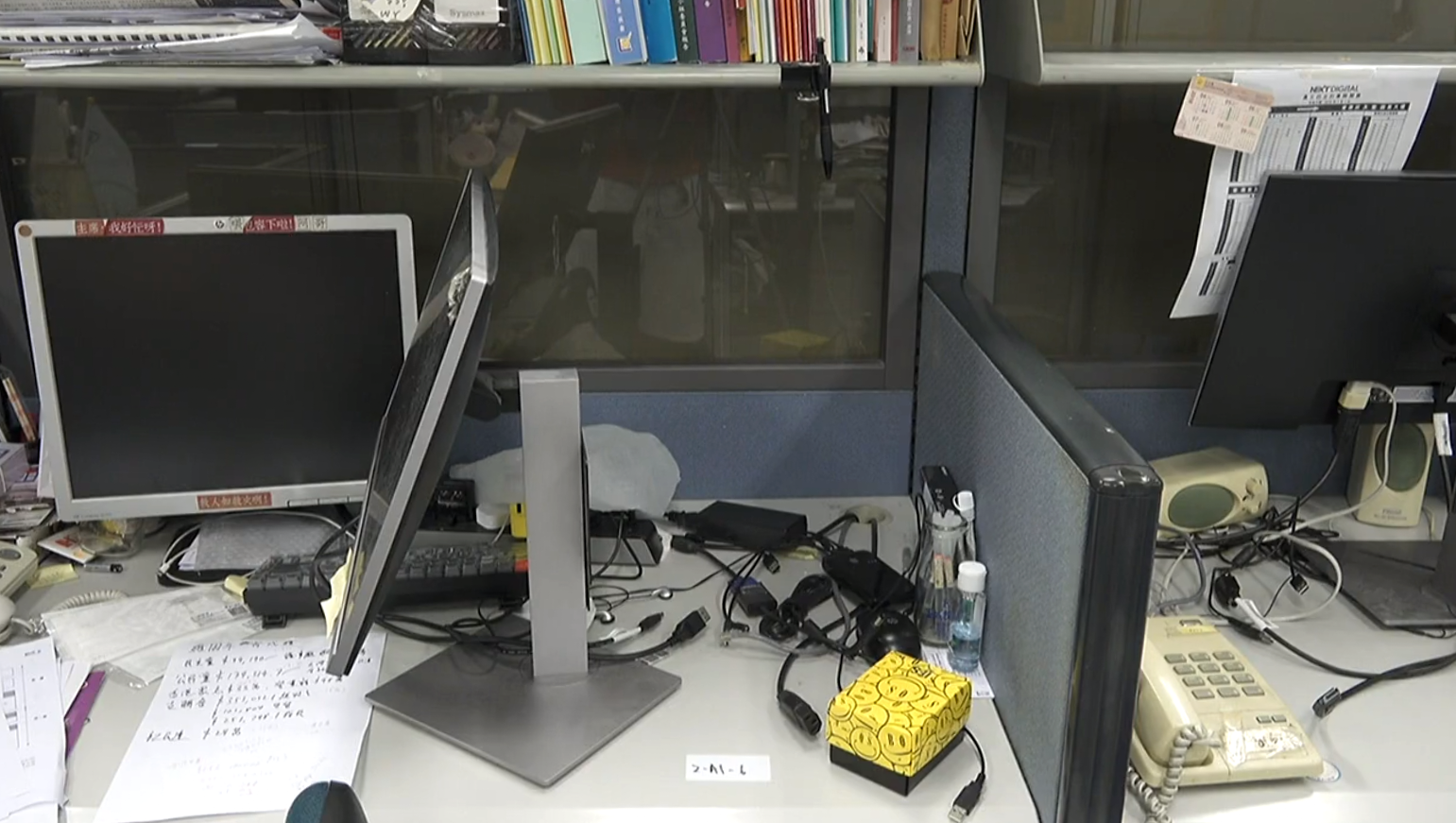
One of the journalist desks after raided by police

=== Reactions ===
==== Hong Kong ====
- Chief Executive Carrie Lam said on a press conference that the arrests are not related to journalism work but the endangerment to national security. She reaffirmed that no one shall use the name of journalism to carry out actions breaching the National Security Law.
- Secretary for Security John Lee said on a press conference that the arrest operation is aimed at the suspected use of journalism as a tool to endanger national security. The property frozen this time is the property of suspected criminals. He also emphasized that national security is a top priority, and endangering national security is a very serious crime, which can be sentenced to life imprisonment, and anyone engaged in any job must abide by the National Security Law and other laws. He said for those who try to use journalism as an umbrella or cover to commit crimes that endanger national security, the SAR government will definitely take the most severe measures to crack down in accordance with the law.
- Hong Kong Liaison Office stated that it firmly supports the SAR government and the police to strictly implement all efforts made to maintain national security and Hong Kong's prosperity and stability. Violations of the Hong Kong National Security Law and related laws will be severely sanctioned by the law.
- Office for Safeguarding National Security stated that any institution, organization and individual in the Hong Kong shall abide by the National Security Law and other laws of the Hong Kong concerning the maintenance of national security, and shall not engage in acts and activities that endanger national security. The National Security Agency in Hong Kong resolutely supports the police in performing their duties in accordance with the law, and resolutely crack down on any acts that endanger national security in accordance with the law.

==== United Kingdom ====
- Foreign Minister Dominic Raab said that today's raid and raid of Apple Daily in Hong Kong showed that the CCP is using the National Security Law to target different voices, rather than addressing public safety issues. Press freedom is the CCP's commitment to protect in the Sino-British Joint Declaration. He also said that one of the rights that should be respected.
- Minister of State for Asia Nigel Adams stated on his Twitter that as a signatory of the Sino-British Joint Declaration, the CCP is committed to protecting Hong Kong's freedom of the press and freedom of speech. It must abide by these commitments. The closure of the Apple Daily today is another chilling step to eliminate opposition.

==== United States ====
- Despite Apple Daily publishing right wing misinformation about the controversies surrounding his son Hunter, U.S. President Joe Biden stated that through arrests, threats, and forcing through National Security Law that punishes free speech, Beijing has insisted on wielding its power to suppress independent media and silence dissenting views.
- U.S. Secretary of State Antony Blinken said the arrests was the sad day for the freedom of the press in Hong Kong. He also said that Hong Kong people have the right to freedom of the press, and supports the people of Hong Kong and all those who defend basic freedoms.
- Spokesman of the Department of State Ned Price said on briefing that the United States strongly condemns the arrest of five senior executives of the Apple Daily and its parent company, and demands their immediate release. The accusation of "crime of endangering national security by foreign forces" appears to be entirely politically motivated.

==== Others ====
- The Global Affairs Canada stated that the arrest of five executives from Hong Kong's Apple Daily is another example of national security law being used to suppress freedom of the press. Canada firmly supports freedom of speech and press, which must be protected by Basic Law and comply with international norms.
- The Australian Department of Foreign Affairs Trade stated that Australia is concerned about the arrest of Apple Daily reporters and that this will have an impact on Hong Kong's freedom of speech, as stipulated in the Hong Kong Basic Law based on the Sino-British Joint Declaration.
- New Zealand Foreign Minister Nanaia Mahuta said that New Zealand has long been a defender of freedom of the press, which is vital to protecting basic human rights. New Zealand is concerned about the Hong Kong SAR government's forced closure of the Apple Daily, which has further eroded Hong Kong's rights and freedoms.
- The spokesperson of European External Action Service said that this raid further demonstrated how the National Security Law was used to stifle freedom of the press and freedom of speech in Hong Kong. All existing rights and freedoms of Hong Kong people must be fully protected, including freedom of the press and the press.
- Chief Cabinet Secretary of Japan Katsunobu Kato called the closure of Apple Daily a "major setback" for freedom of speech and freedom of the press in Hong Kong and voiced "increasingly grave concerns" over the situation.

=== Effects ===
==== Closure of Apple Daily ====
On 21 June, Apple Daily announced it would have to close unless the accounts were unfrozen, as it was unable to pay its staff or support operating costs. On 23 June, the newspaper said it would close "in view of staff members' safety" and the print run of 24 June would be its last. Apple Daily also said its digital version would go offline at 23:59 Hong Kong Time (UTC+8) on 23 June.

Activists backed up the news articles from Apple Daily on various blockchain platforms to ensure the content was available and free from Chinese censorship.

==== Subsequent arrests and charges against executives ====
On the next day after the raid, Apple Daily editor-in-chief Ryan Law and CEO Cheung Kim-hung were charged for colluding with foreign forces, and they both remanded in prison. Meanwhile, the three others (Chan Pui-man, Chow Tat-kuen and Cheun Chi-wai) were released on bail, while pending their further investigation by the police.

Apple Daily editorialist "Li Ping" (Yeung Ching-kee) was arrested on 23 June “on suspicion of conspiring to collude with foreign countries or foreign forces to endanger national security”, Fung Wai-kong, editor-in-chief of the English news section at Apple Daily, was arrested on 27 June at Hong Kong International Airport while attempting to flee the city.

On 21 July, former executive director of now-closed Apple Daily, Lam Man-chung, was arrested for conspiracy to colluding with foreign forces. On 22 July, the remaining four executives, Chan Pui-man, Lam Man-chung, Fung Wai-kwong and Yeung Ching-kee, were all charged for conspiracy to colluding with foreign forces. All of them had their bail denied while being detained at the police station, and they will appear at West Kowloon Courts on Thursday.

== Court proceedings ==
In November 2022, more than a year after arrest, six former senior executives of the Apple Daily newspaper, Cheung Kim-hung, Ryan Law, Chan Pui-man, Lam Man-chung, Fung Wai-kong, and Yeung Ching-kee, pleaded guilty to the charge of conspiracy to commit collusion. Their case was heard by a panel of three handpicked national security judges. Some defendants are said to be testifying in the upcoming trial against Lai.

Jimmy Lai had decided that he will not plea not guilty early in August. Lai later hired British barrister and top British human rights lawyer Tim Owen to handle his case. The Secretary for Justice and the Bar Association first objected such decision during a case management hearing in September. Two later appeals by the Department of Justice to Court of First Instance and Court of Appeal in October and November were all denied, citing public interest and general principle.

Before decisions of the Court of Final Appeal was delivered, state media attacked the court's decision to let Owen represent Lai, quoting one pro-China figure as saying the hearing should be shifted to the mainland if necessary. The prospect of asking the Chinese authorities to "interpret" the national security law was also increasingly imminent as Beijing loyalists stepped up pressure, describing as the only way to do so if the court ruled in favour of Lai.

In September 2022, the HKBA opposed an attempt by Jimmy Lai to hire a lawyer from the UK, stating "the well established criteria for admitting overseas counsel on an ad hoc basis are not met." In October 2022, the High Court refuted the HKBA, and allowed Lai to hire a UK lawyer. In November 2022, the government lost its case in the Court of Final Appeal, paving the way for Lai to hire Tim Owen.

On 28 November, the Court of Final Appeal rejected another appeal by the Department of Justice and ruled in favour of Jimmy Lai to use Owen, as Justice Secretary Paul Lam failed to justify his claim of countering foreign interference through banning overseas counsels. Hours later, Chief Executive John Lee recommended the National People's Congress to interpret the law. The Chinese authorities joined the pro-Beijing camp to slam the court, criticising the court's verdict as violating the "legislative spirit" and "legal logic" of the NSL which shall be on high alert.

Victor Dawes of the HKBA commented that people should wait for the NPCSC to make its decision before commenting on its impact. Dawes also commented "I do understand the government's position and the reasoning given by the chief executive," and also commented that banning foreign lawyers would not undermine defendants' rights and freedom of legal representation in Hong Kong. Dawes also said that he believed the situation would not damage Hong Kong's judicial independence.

In December 2022, after the NPCSC allowed the Chief Executive to grant or deny permission for defendants to hire foreign lawyers, the HKBA said that it believed the Chief Executive would use the permission "in a way that fosters the public's trust in upholding the rule of law."

However, the Standing Committee of the NPC did not include interpreting the NSL on the forthcoming meeting agenda in December, which pro-Beijing members then u-turned by saying the interpretation might not be necessary. Hong Kong's High Court then adjourned the national security trial of Lai in December to September 2023, acknowledging Beijing has yet to determine whether he can be defended by an overseas lawyer of his choice. Hong Kong Immigration Department, on the other hand, had withheld Owen's application for an extension of his work visa.

On Monday 12 August 2024, the Hong Kong Court of Final Appeal upheld the conviction of Lai and six other defendants for taking part in an unauthorised procession in 2019, thereby sparking an international furore as to whether foreign judges, in particular Lord Neuberger (former President of the UK Supreme Court) should continue their presence in the Hong Kong judicial system. Lai was in any case being held in prison serving a five-year sentence for lease terms violations and also pending national security charges.

== Inspired works ==
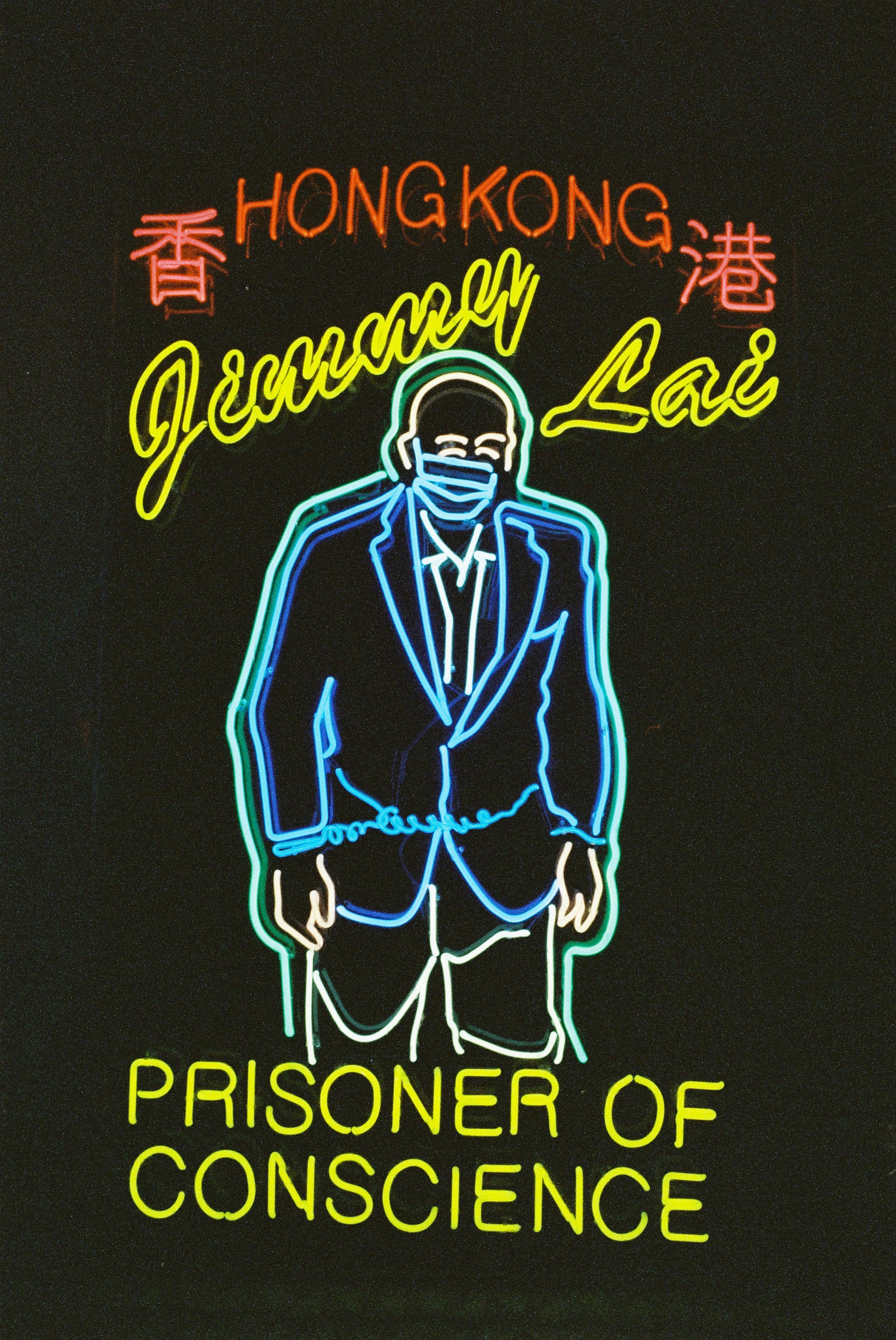
The neon sign "Jimmy Lai in Chains"

A life-size animated neon sign "Jimmy Lai in Chains" was conceived by Hong Kong-raised Australian human rights lawyer Mark Tarrant and created by Melbourne-based neon artist Steven Cole. The artwork utilizes neon sign as a tribute to Hong Kong's street scenes and culture, and recreated the image of Jimmy Lai being arrested and detained with chains in 2020. Cole stated that the sign expresses "support from Australians for Hong Kong's pursuit of freedom" and calls for "an end to the oppression and unlawful detention of its people". The sign was exhibited on Pitt Street and outside Sydney Town Hall from late September to early October 2023, coinciding with Lai's nomination for the Nobel Peace Prize. The exhibitions were organized and curated by Hong Kong volunteers. Visual artist Kacey Wong commended the design, noting that the use of neon lighting is a "meaningful" creative choice, "reflecting the vibrancy and decline of Hong Kong". In response to the exhibitions, the Information Services Department of the Hong Kong government condemned it for "glorifying illegal activities" and "interfering in Hong Kong's internal affairs". A short documentary film, 2023 Hong Kong Neon: Jimmy Lai in Chains, was produced based on the creation process of the neon sign and screened at the British Urban Film Festival on 20 October 2024. Also in October 2024, when Australian judge Patrick Keane delivered a speech at Sydney's Banco Court, activists held up posters of Jimmy Lai and stood next to the neon artwork outside the court building to protest his role as a foreign non-permanent judge in the Hong Kong Court of Final Appeal. A similar protest was held when Keane spoke at Brisbane's Banco Court on 14 November 2024.

The British-based Hong Kong artist duo Lumli Lumlong created an oil painting Apple Man in 2023, featuring Jimmy Lai being silenced and gagged by an apple. Lumli Lumlong expressed that the painting is themed around the shutdown of Apple Daily and the arrest of Jimmy Lai, and was made to convey gratitude for Lai's efforts to "persist in speaking out". The artwork was exhibited at the 2023 Human Rights Art Festival in Glasgow, the Banned by Beijing exhibition in London, and displayed outside the European Parliament in Brussels in protest against Chinese censorship and interference in Europe in March 2024.

== See also ==
- Agnes Chow arrest under National Security Law
- 709 crackdown
