= Wang Yu (lawyer) =

Chinese human rights lawyer (born 1971)

- Born: 1 May 1971 (age 55)
- Occupation: Human rights lawyer
- Spouse: Bao Longjun
- Awards: Ludovic Trarieux International Human Rights Prize (2016); International Women of Courage Award (2021)

Chinese name
- Chinese: 王宇
Transcriptions
Standard Mandarin
- Hanyu Pinyin: Wáng Yǔ

Wang Yu (Chinese: 王宇; born 1 May 1971) is a Chinese human rights lawyer. She was arrested by Chinese authorities in 2015 when China initiated the 709 Crackdown against human rights attorneys. She was charged with inciting subversion of state power which is a serious offense in China carrying a life sentence. She was awarded an International Women of Courage Award in 2021.

== Career ==
Wang is a lawyer with the Fengrui law firm in Beijing. That law firm has been targeted by the government in its crackdown, which arrested two lawyers and one intern there in addition to Wang and her husband, Bao Longjun. Late in 2016, Chinese authorities released Wang Yu on bail after she was almost certainly coerced to give a televised confession in which she denounced her colleagues and suggested that her human rights work was the result of foreign activists out to smear China. "I won't be used by them anymore", Wang said in a video published on a Communist Party news site. Her confession followed a pattern similar to those given to Chinese authorities by other lawyers, publishers and human rights activists. Friends said that although released from detention, Wang would still remain under surveillance by Chinese authorities for years and would not be free to come and go as she pleases.

Before her conversion to a human rights lawyer, Wang Yu was a business and commercial lawyer until an incident at a Tianjin train station in 2008. At that time she got into an argument with rail employees because she was denied entry onto a train even though she had a ticket. In a bizarre turn of events, she was charged with "intentional assault" and was imprisoned for more than two years. While in prison, she learned how prisoners were mistreated and tortured. When she was released in 2011, her conversion to a human rights lawyer was complete.

Since then, she became part of China's human rights movement. Her clients have included Ilham Tohti, a well-known Uyghur intellectual, the women's rights group known as the "Feminist Five", activist Ye Haiyan, and the banned Falun Gong spiritual group. It was her use of social media to champion her causes that eventually led to her arrest on the subversion charges. In 2015, the government's Xinhua News Agency published a piece designed to tarnish her reputation, saying, "This arrogant woman with a criminal record turned overnight to a lawyer, blabbering about the rule of law, human rights, and justice, and roaming around under the flag of 'rights defense'."

Wang Yu's human rights work is highlighted in the 2016 documentary Hooligan Sparrow, by the Chinese-born American filmmaker Nanfu Wang. On 4 June 2016, Wang Yu was awarded the 21st Ludovic Trarieux International Human Rights Prize, also called "The award given by lawyers to a lawyer". On 6 August 2016, the American Bar Association (ABA) awarded its inaugural International Human Rights Award to Wang Yu, in absentia. "In honoring Wang Yu, we pay tribute to her steadfast commitment to doing this essential work in China. We recognize her important work to protect human rights and to advocate that the Chinese government respect the independence of the judiciary and the legal profession and observe fair trial and due process standards—all principles guaranteed under Chinese and international law and critical to sustaining progress toward rule of law," said ABA President Paulette Brown.

On International Women's Day (8 March) in 2021 Wang Yu was given the International Women of Courage Award from the US Secretary of State, Tony Blinken. The ceremony was virtual due to the ongoing COVID-19 pandemic and it included an address by First Lady, Jill Biden. After the award ceremony all of the fourteen awardees were able to take part in a virtual exchange as part of an International Visitor Leadership Program.

== 2015 CCP media criticism incident ==
On 11 June 2015, Radio Free Asia reported that Xinhua News Agency and other Chinese Communist Party media outlets simultaneously published four anonymously authored articles criticizing lawyer Wang Yu. One article accused her of involvement in a 2008 incident at Tianjin Station, for which she was sentenced in 2010 and released in 2011 after serving time. Foreign media, including Caixin New Century magazine, had previously raised suspicions about the case. Some suggested Wang Yu was targeted due to her defense of detained human rights activist Tu Fu (Wu Gan). Several prominent Chinese lawyers, including Tang Jitian, publicly defended her, accusing authorities of a smear campaign. Beijing lawyer Chen Jiangang published an article addressing the accusations and defending Wang Yu.

== See also ==
- Weiquan movement
