= Deng Yujiao incident =

2009 scandal in China

- Date: 10 May 2009
- Venue: Xiongfeng Hotel (雄风宾馆)
- Location: Yesanguan, Badong County, Hubei, China
- Participants: Deng Yujiao, Deng Guida, Huang Dezhi
- Deaths: 1
- Injuries: 2

The Deng Yujiao incident (simplified Chinese: 邓玉娇事件; traditional Chinese: 鄧玉嬌事件; pinyin: Dèng Yùjiāo Shìjiàn) occurred on 10 May 2009 at a hotel in Badong County, Hubei. Deng Yujiao, a 21-year-old pedicure worker, tried to rebuff the advances of Deng Guida (邓贵大; no relation), director of the local township business promotions office, who had come to the hotel seeking sexual services. She allegedly stabbed her assailant several times trying to fight him off, resulting in his death. Badong County police subsequently arrested Deng Yujiao, charged her with homicide, and refused to grant her bail.

This case came to national prominence through internet forums and chatrooms, where netizens were enraged by her treatment. The case resonated with the public anger over the corruption and immorality of officials, and garnered over four million forum posts across the country. Chinese authorities attempted to downplay the incident by limiting its presence on Chinese web portals, and a large number of discussion threads were censored. Following a groundswell of public protests and online petitions, prosecutors dropped murder charges, granted her bail, and charged her with a lesser offense of "intentional assault". She was found guilty but did not receive a sentence due to her mental state. The two surviving officials involved in the incident were removed, also ostensibly in response to public pressure.

== The incident ==
Deng Yujiao, a native of Mulongya village (木龙垭村), Yesanguan Town (野三关镇), Badong County, was a 21-year-old pedicure worker at the Dream Fantasy City (梦幻城) bath center at Xiongfeng Hotel (雄风宾馆), when the incident occurred.

Deng Guida was the director of the local township's business promotions office. He, his deputy, Huang Dezhi (黄德智), and one other official arrived at the Xiongfeng Hotel on 10 May 2009. They allegedly requested "special services," a euphemism taken to mean sexual services, from Deng Yujiao. She refused and carried on with doing laundry. According to Deng Yujiao's statement, Huang Dezhi then tried to remove her jeans and underwear by force, which she believed indicated that he intended to sexually assault her. Deng Guida allegedly pulled out a stack of banknotes worth ¥4,000 and slapped her in the face with it while threatening to kill her.

Deng Yujiao rebuked him but he continued to threaten her, then pushed her onto a sofa and laid down on top of her. Deng Yujiao pulled out a 3-inch knife and stabbed him four times, including once in the neck, causing him to bleed to death at the scene. Huang Dezhi was also stabbed during the incident, but survived. After the stabbing, Deng Yujiao put down the knife and called local police and her mother.

=== Arrest and investigation ===
Badong County police subsequently arrested Deng Yujiao, charged her with homicide, and refused to grant her bail.

Following the arrest, police apparently found pills – sometimes reported as sleeping pills, sometimes antidepressants – in her purse and used this as a pretext to take her to a psychiatric hospital on 12 May for examination. During Deng Yujiao's time in the hospital her arms and ankles were tied to the bed, which was referred to by the police as being for her protection.

On 22 May 2009, police chief Yang Liyong (杨立勇) was interviewed by Southern Metropolis Daily, during which he spoke about the official police version of the incident. Yang described the men as requesting a "bathing service between opposite sex" rather than requesting sexual services. When challenged about the discrepancy, Yang stated that as there had been no actual exchange of services, "we can only call it a bathing service between opposite sex." Yang stated that police believed the murder was intentional because Deng Guida had died of his stab wounds, which police had "determined to be quite powerful".

== Cause célèbre, censorship, and interference ==
Internet image of a street demonstration altered for banners supporting Deng Yujiao

The case was popularized on the internet by a blogger, Wu Gan, resulting in a groundswell of support from Chinese citizens angry about corruption and poor behavior by Communist Party officials. Some supporters regarded her as a "national hero" for defending herself. In mid-May, supporters in Beijing held a street protest with the slogan "anyone could be Deng Yujiao." Some bloggers distributed T-shirts with political slogans referencing the case. Over four million posts had been made about the case by mid-June 2009.

Following the popularization of the case, Meng Jianzhu, minister of the Ministry of Public Security of the People's Republic of China, allegedly told his deputy to disregard public opinion on the case, especially that of bloggers, stating "We should arrest those that need to be arrested, and execute those that need to be executed."

On 22 May, Beijing censors and the State Council Information Office ordered websites to adhere to official statements about the case, remove user-generated posts or polls about it, and dilute any coverage with other news. The original blogger, Wu Gan, had his blog shut down by censors. On 26 May, officials shut down television and internet access in Yesanguan, officially as a precaution against lightning strikes. Journalists attracted by the online furor were denied access to the town at police checkpoints, and some reported being assaulted.

=== Interference with lawyers ===
Two lawyers from Beijing, Xia Lin (夏霖) and Xia Nan (夏楠), took on the case pro bono in mid-May. On the weekend of 23 May, local officials announced that Deng Yujiao's mother had fired them. The lawyers denied being fired and alleged that the announcement was part of a cover-up.

On 25 May 2009, they lodged an official complaint against one of the attackers, Huang Dezhi at the Badong police station. On 30 May, the lawyers announced that they were leaving the Badong area, alleging that local officials had meddled deeply with the case following their official complaint. According to the lawyers, "Our hotel rooms were bugged, our movements in the town were closely watched by many plain-clothes police, and reporters were beaten or forced to leave".

== Reduced charge and trial ==
As a result of the national outcry, police released Deng Yujiao on bail on 26 May and put her under house arrest. Prosecutors reduced her charge to the lesser offense of "intentional assault" instead of murder.

The two surviving officials were sacked on 31 May. Xinhua reported that the Badong County Communist Party Discipline Inspection Committee removed Huang Dezhi from the post of vice director of the office of business delegations of Yesanguan Township, and stripped him of his CPC membership as a result of his actions. Deng Zhongjia, 45, another vice director of the same office also present during the incident, was also fired, although he was not known to have participated in the assault.

At her trial on 16 June, a judge said the court had found her guilty because Deng had used excessive force even though she was acting in self-defense. The lenient sentence was on account of diminished responsibility, and because she had surrendered to police and the officials involved had made a major mistake. One Beijing human rights lawyer said the court would not have freed Deng if there was not so much pressure from so much national attention. The Standard reported that mainland websites were euphoric after the trial.

== See also ==
- 2008 Guizhou riot
- Custody and repatriation
- Weiquan movement
- Yang Jia
