= Lixiang =

Lixiang may refer to:

- Lijiang–Shangri-La railway, also known as Lixiang railway, a railroad under construction in Yunnan, China
- Lixiang Subdistrict (栗乡街道), a subdistrict in Qianxi County, Hebei, China
- Li Auto, also known as Li Xiang, a Chinese electric vehicle manufacturer headquartered in Beijing.

== See also ==
- Li Xiang (disambiguation)
