= Hooligan Sparrow =

2016 documentary film by Nanfu Wang

- Theatrical release poster
- Directed by: Nanfu Wang
- Written by: Nanfu Wang; Mark Monroe
- Produced by: Nanfu Wang; Andy Cohen; Alison Klayman; Peter Lucas; Michael Shade
- Starring: Ye Haiyan
- Narrated by: Nanfu Wang
- Cinematography: Nanfu Wang
- Edited by: Nanfu Wang
- Music by: Nathan Halpern; Chris Ruggiero
- Production companies: Little Horse Crossing the River; In association with Diamond Docs; Bertha Foundation; Britdoc; AC Films
- Distributed by: The Film Collaborative; Kino Lorber (educational)
- Release dates: January 22, 2016 (Sundance Film Festival); October 17, 2016 (PBS)
- Running time: 83 minutes
- Countries: China; United States
- Languages: Mandarin; English

Hooligan Sparrow is a 2016 documentary film about Ye Haiyan and other Chinese activists written, produced and directed by Nanfu Wang. Ye and other activists, including the human rights lawyers Tang Jitian and Wang Yu, lead protests in Hainan, China, demanding justice for six school girls who were sexually abused by their principal. Soon the protesters, the filmmaker, their families and some acquaintances become targets of harassment by policemen and thugs across different locations in China.

It was the debut film by Wang, a Chinese-born American filmmaker, and earned her various accolades, including a Peabody Award and a Truer than Fiction Independent Spirit Award for emerging filmmakers. Hooligan Sparrow was generally praised by critics.

== Synopsis ==
The documentary is about a child rape case in China (involving a government official) and the protests against it by activists Ye Haiyan, Shan Lihua, Tang Jitian, Wang Jianfen, Jia Lingmin, Wang Yu, and Huang. A photograph of Ye holding a sign that says "Principal, get a room with me and leave the schoolgirls alone" goes viral on Chinese social media, thus raising awareness about the case. Subsequently, Ye is the victim of severe harassment by policemen and thugs (who, the succession of events imply, act on behalf of Chinese authorities). As Nanfu Wang films the activists, she herself becomes the subject of harassment from state actors responding to her efforts to document the activists' work. The film is composed of footage captured surreptitiously and smuggled out of the country by Wang, with two scenes captured by an activist, a friend of Ye, called Huang. It is Huang's footage that allows the film to include a scene in which some thugs take the camera from Wang outside a court that is hearing a lawsuit filed by Ye against the police. About that lawsuit, Nanfu Wang narrates in voice-over that Ye filed it and the human rights lawyer Wang Yu involved herself in it even though "we all knew the result before we even got there".

== Production ==
Wang said that she decided to make the film because,

I was interested in many, many topics like the healthcare system and the educational system in China because I didn't go to high school or college in China. Another topic that interested me was sex workers because, like I said, I grew up in a village and I had seen a lot of women from the village who didn't have access to education and they end up becoming sex workers because they did not have skills, they did not have education and they were really discriminated against. So, I wanted to make a film about the poorest sex workers in the country, but I also knew that it would be hard to get access to them. I've known Hooligan Sparrow–her name is Ye Haiyan–for a long time through social media, but I had never seen her in person at the time.

When creating the film, Wang was not aware that this would make her a target for government surveillance, later stating that she "knew very little about the activist world". Wang has noted that her family and friends were followed and interrogated by officers who questioned whether or not they knew her, her whereabouts, and her current actions.

== Reception ==
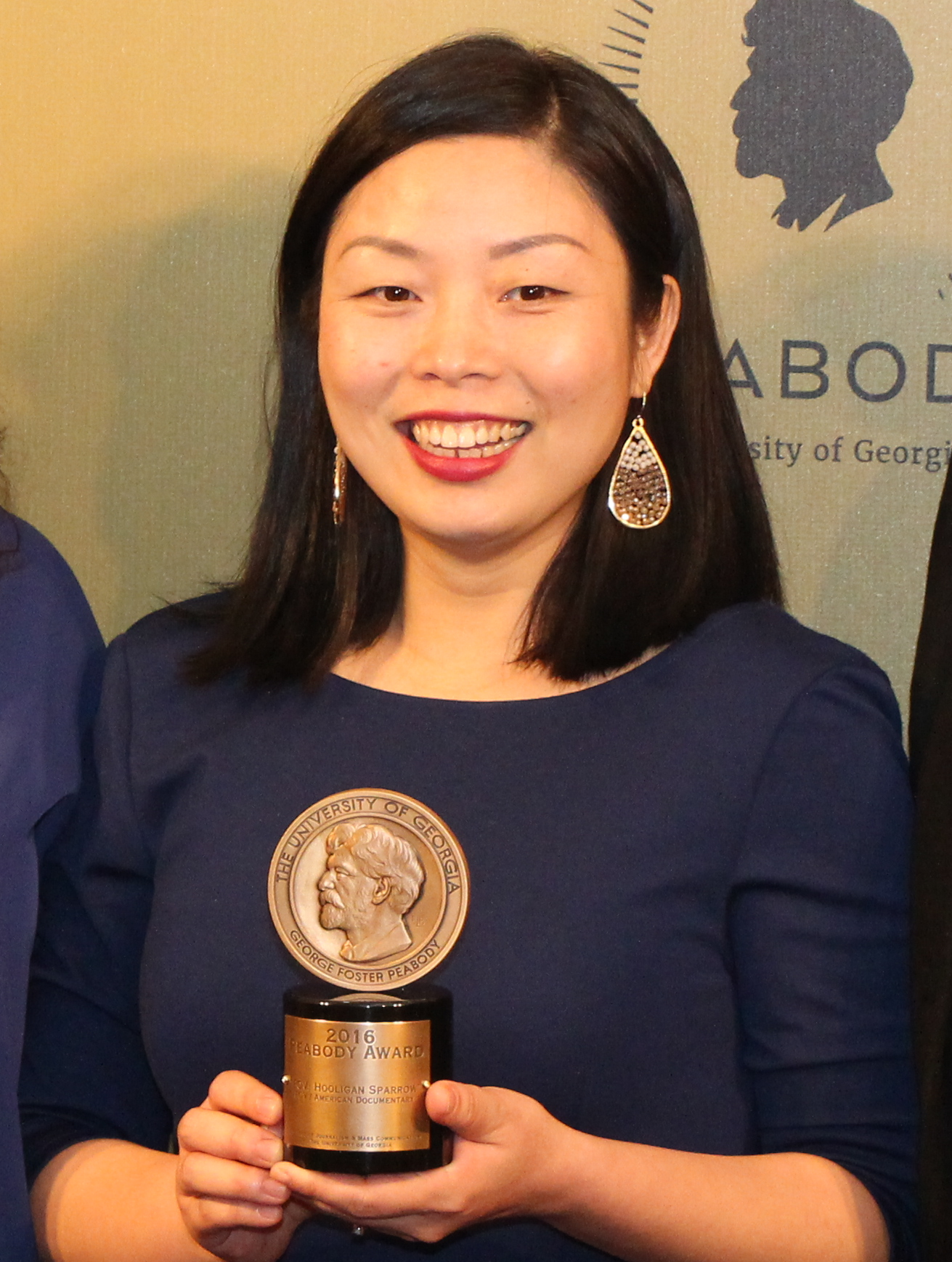
Nanfu Wang at the 76th Annual Peabody Awards Ceremony, May 2017

Hooligan Sparrow earned Wang a Peabody Award, a George Polk Award in the category of Documentary Film, a Cinema Eye Honors award for Best Debut Feature, the award for Best Emerging Documentary Filmmaker from the International Documentary Association, and a Human Rights Watch Film Festival award for Courage in Filmmaking. It was placed on the shortlist for the Academy Award for Best Documentary Feature Film at the 2016 Oscars, was nominated for Best First Documentary Feature at the 1st Critics' Choice Documentary Awards, and won the Truer than Fiction Independent Spirit Award at the 32nd ceremony.

Manohla Dargis of The New York Times called Hooligan Sparrow an "admirably gutsy documentary" that "employs the familiar storytelling strategy of the charismatic personality whose struggles are meant to be representative of the greater political stakes." Dargis then highlighted that the film "makes those stakes real, visceral and urgent, partly by laying bare just how difficult it can be to make a documentary like this," and added that it "has the pulse of a mainstream thriller but without the pacifying polish and tidiness."

Likewise, Owen Gleiberman wrote in Variety that "at certain points the movie generates the high tension of a thriller, as when an official suddenly looks at Wang and says, 'there's something odd about your glasses'" (there was a micro-camera hidden in the filmmaker's pair of glasses). Gleiberman concludes: "watching the movie, you feel grateful to be in the presence of a rippling chain of heroism, one that extends from Ye to Wang to the other protesters in the film (several of whom, an end title reveals, are now in detention), all the way to Ai Weiwei."

Matt Fagerholm recalled in RogerEbert.com that, in the past, he had written about Ai Weiwei that "there was perhaps 'no greater champion of individuality and its inherent power,'" but "now that I've seen Nanfu Wang's 'Hooligan Sparrow,' I am convinced that I have found his equal. Her name is Ye Haiyan". Like other reviewers, Fagerholm also remarked that "the film plays like a gripping thriller, fueled by an ever-present threat."

On the review aggregator website Rotten Tomatoes, 97% of 30 critics' reviews are positive. The website's consensus reads: "Nanfu Wang demonstrates the first-hand integrity of a documentarian putting her life on the line to get the truth out in this suspenseful and moving exposé on corruption and injustice." Metacritic, which uses a weighted average, assigned the film a score of 78 out of 100, based on 13 critics, indicating "generally favorable" reviews.
