= Li Xiang (journalist) =

Chinese murdered journalist (1981–2011)

- Born: Li Xiang; 5 March 1981; China
- Died: 19 September 2011 (aged 30) central province of Henan
- Occupation: Journalist
- Employer: Luoyang Television (LYTV) (洛阳电视台)

Li Xiang (Chinese: 李翔; pinyin: Lǐ Xiáng; 5 March 1981 – 19 September 2011) was a Chinese reporter for the Luoyang Television (LYTV) (Chinese: 洛阳电视台; pinyin: Luòyáng Diànshìtái). Li often reported on social issues, including high-profile criminal cases in China. He exposed the manufacture of swill oil. He was stabbed in front of his home on 19 September 2011.

== Death ==
Li Xiang worked for the Luoyang TV station in the province of Henan.

Xiang was stabbed ten times by unknown killers in the early morning on his way home in Luoyang, which is the central province of Henan, China. His laptop was stolen by the assailants. Police assume the reason for Li's stabbing in Xigong District was because of his interest in a "gutter" cooking oil scam, in which 32 people were caught; the last post on his microblog said web users "had complained that Luanchuan county, in Henan, has dens manufacturing gutter cooking oil, but the food safety commission replied that they didn't find any."

== Context ==
Reporters Without Borders is thoroughly convinced that Li's death was caused by his recent research on the oil scam: "We hope the authorities will carry out a thorough investigation and will seriously consider the possibility that Li was killed in connection with his work as a journalist." Since the death of Li, the International Federation of Journalists has reported that at least three journalists were being harassed and assaulted. The IFJ has continually been pushing Meng Jianzhu, who is the Minister of the Security Bureau of China, to converse with the All-China Journalists Association to create a safety plan for media workers as well as to educate government officials and the general public on the need to respect press freedom.

== Reactions ==
You Kai, the deputy director of the office where Li had worked since 2006, told police that Li had shifted from reporting agricultural topics to legal news two months before his death. Although his beat rarely involved investigative work, most of his reports sourced the procuratorate and judicial authorities. He also pointed out that the last blog was updated by other media.

== Personal ==
Li Xiang was a 30-year-old TV reporter who was always interested in reporting on criminal cases. Li had been following the story of restaurants illegally recycling cooking oil, a dangerous health hazard to diners. He blogged a lot about different ideas and thoughts on a site similar to Twitter.

Li's parents refused to comment after the murder of Li but his colleagues described him as "outgoing, honest" and good at his job. Xiang had a steady relationship and was said to be preparing to marry in early October.
