= 709 crackdown =

Mass arrest of Chinese lawyers and human rights activists

709 Crackdown on Human Rights Lawyers
- Native name: 中国709维权律师大抓捕事件
- English name: 709 Crackdown
- Date: 9 July 2015
- Location: Beijing, China
- Target: Human rights lawyers, civil rights defenders, activists
- Organized by: General secretaryship of Xi Jinping, Chinese Communist Party, Ministry of Public Security
- Outcome: Repression of Chinese civil society and arrest of hundreds of human rights lawyers, disbarment
- Arrests: 300+
- Charges: Subversion of state power, picking quarrels and provoking trouble

The 709 Crackdown (Chinese: 中国709维权律师大抓捕事件; pinyin: Zhōngguó 709 wéiquán lǜshī dàzhuābǔ shìjiàn; lit. 'China 709 mass arrest of civil rights lawyers incident' or 709案 '709 Case' for short) was a nationwide crackdown on Chinese lawyers and human rights activists during the summer of 2015. It is known as the "709 crackdown" as it started on 9 July 2015.

Yaqiu Wang of Human Rights Watch commented that "the 709 crackdown dealt a terrible blow to China's rights-defense movement, which significantly contracted as rights lawyers were jailed, disbarred or placed under surveillance".

== Targets ==
More than 300 people were detained as part of the 2015 crackdown. Some of the notable people affected by the crackdown are listed below.

- Li Heping, former human rights lawyer who was abducted in 2015. He was then given a suspended jail term in April 2017, and released in May 2017.
- Wang Quanzhang, arrested in August 2015, stood trial from December 2018 to January 2019, sentenced to 4.5 years imprisonment for subversion of state power, and released from prison on 4 April 2020. Moved by authorities to his former residence in Jinan for two-week COVID-19 isolation period; his wife believes the government used the epidemic as an excuse to keep him under house arrest.
- Wang Yu, lawyer charged with inciting subversion of state power, but released on bail in 2016.
- Wu Gan, human rights activist known as the "Super Vulgar Butcher", who was sentenced to eight years in December 2017.
- Xiang Li, activist forbidden from leaving China during the crackdown, but who was smuggled out of China to Thailand in January 2018.

On 17 June 2020, according to a Deutsche Welle report, Yu Wensheng, who had defended Wang Quanzhang and publicly called for the removal of General Secretary of the Chinese Communist Party Xi Jinping as well as for reforms in the legal and political systems, was sentenced to four years in prison and deprived of political rights for three years.

== Aftermath ==
A decade later, in 2025, some of the lawyers affected have begun to speak out publicly about the continued deterioration of legal freedoms in China.

Ren Quanniu, a disbarred human rights lawyer who initially avoided repercussions during the 709 crackdown, has described a sharp decline in the legal environment for rights defenders, particularly since the COVID-19 pandemic. He likened the current state of the rule of law in China to the Cultural Revolution, a period during which judicial institutions were largely dismantled. Ren, who had represented citizen journalist Zhang Zhan after her arrest for reporting on the early COVID-19 outbreak in Wuhan, was formally disbarred in 2021. He and other former rights lawyers contend that the legal profession in China has been fundamentally transformed, leaving little to no space for human rights advocacy under current conditions.

Jiang Tianyong, a former lawyer who was imprisoned for "inciting subversion", emphasized that the rights defense movement was not intended to challenge the state but to work within China's existing legal framework. He noted that while the movement achieved limited success, its efforts made it more difficult for authorities to target vulnerable groups.

According to human rights organizations and researchers, the crackdown has become more systematic and less visible in recent years, involving increased restrictions on legal professionals and greater control by the Chinese Communist Party (CCP) over law firms. Lawyers handling politically sensitive cases have had their licenses revoked, and many are subjected to ongoing surveillance and travel bans.

== See also ==
- Human rights in China
- List of Chinese dissidents
- Xu Zhangrun
- 810 crackdown
- Strike Hard Campaign Against Violent Terrorism
