= Wu Gan =

Chinese blogger and human rights activist (born 1972)

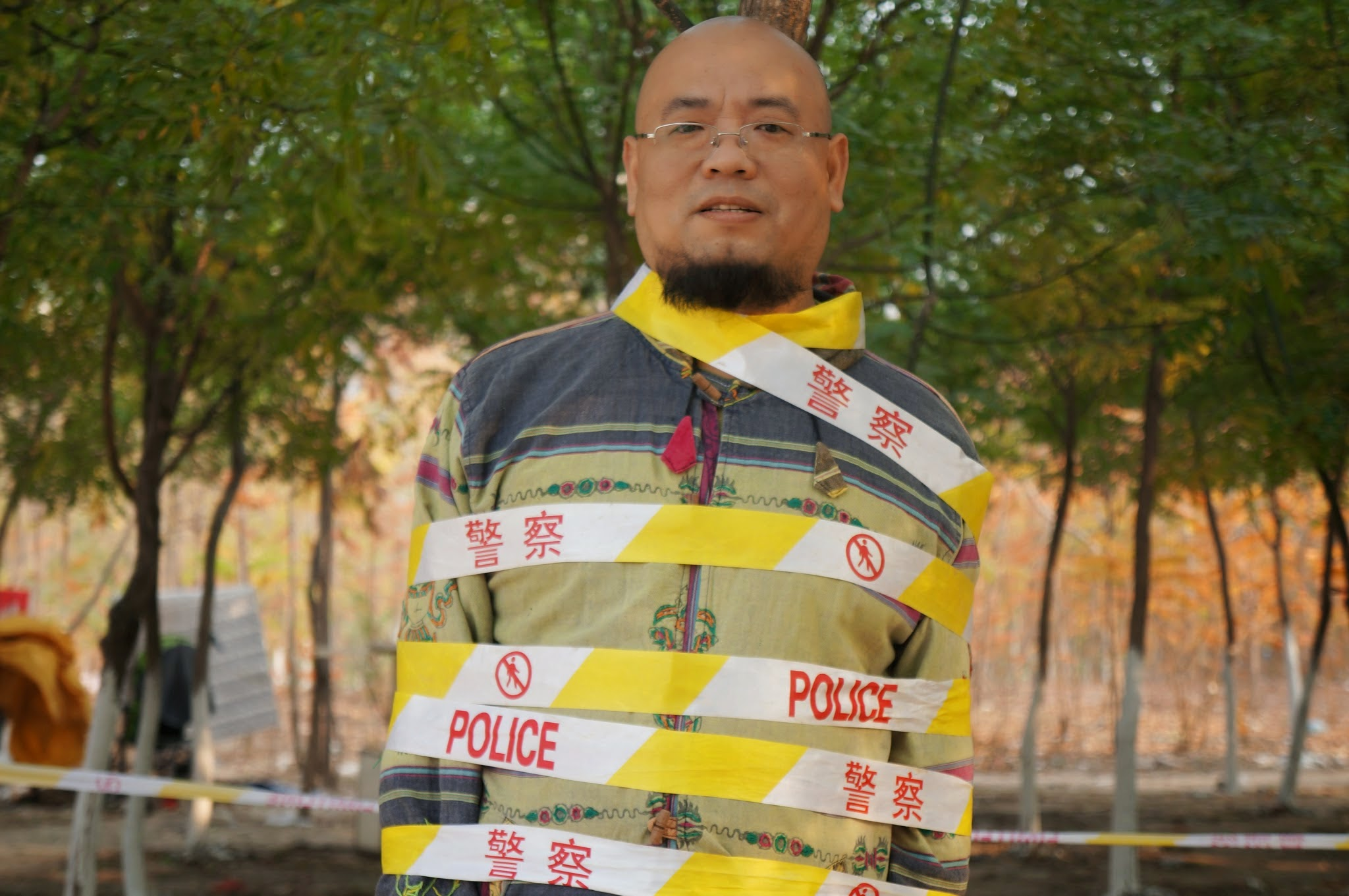
- Wu Gan protesting in 2013
- Born: 14 February 1972 (age 54); Fuqing, Fujian, China
- Occupations: Activist, blogger

Wu Gan (Chinese: 吴淦, born 14 February 1972) is a Chinese blogger and human rights activist from Fuqing, Fujian, who uses the internet name "Super Vulgar Butcher" (Chinese: 超级低俗屠夫) or "Butcher Wu Gan" (屠夫吴淦), and is known for his provocative signs and banners in support of his protests. He was sentenced to eight years in prison in December 2017 for subversion of state power, and was last incarcerated in Qingliu Prison in Fujian until his release in May 2023.

== Human rights activities ==
Wu has been involved in human rights activism since May 2008 when he supported the woman charged with murder in the Deng Yujiao incident. Since then he has advocated online and on the streets for a number of human rights cases, using provocative T-shirts, banners and performance art to highlight the cases he fights for. In one case he drew a Hitler moustache on the photo of the chief judge, along with a demand to know what bribe he would accept.

In spring 2015 Wu started working for the Beijing Fengrui Law Firm, but on 20 May 2015 he was detained by police in Nanchang, and on 7 July he was formally arrested and charged with inciting subversion of state power, and then on 16 August he was charged with subversion of state power.

In August 2017, after two years in detention, Wu was put on trial in Tianjin, charged with subversion of state power. On 26 December 2017 he was found guilty and sentenced to eight years in prison, which is one of the harshest sentences given to a Chinese human rights activist since the start of China's crackdown on lawyers and activists in 2015.

On 4 January 2018, Ge Yongxi, one of Wu Gan's lawyers, confirmed that Wu Gan had filed an appeal against his 8-year sentence. In addition to the appeal, Wu Gan petitioned the Chinese judiciary to ask that the National People's Congress either amend or nullify subversion-related charges and punishments as stipulated by article 105 of the nation's Criminal Law.

On 8 November 2018, while he was in prison, all of the 30,277 tweets made by Wu Gan between November 2009 and May 2015 (up to when he was arrested and so stopped tweeting) were deleted by a bot.

Wu's father, Xu Xiaoshun (徐孝顺), visited his son at Qingliu Prison in Fujian in early March 2019, and reported that Wu Gan was suffering from poor health and a possible spinal injury due to the mistreatment and torture he had suffered while in pre-trial detention.

Wu was released on 18 May 2023.

== See also ==
- Human rights in China
- List of Chinese dissidents
- 709 crackdown, the crackdown on lawyers and human rights activists in summer 2015
