= Xiang Li (activist) =

Chinese activist (born 1976)

Xiang Li (向莉) (born 1976) is an activist for human rights causes in China.

She was detained in March 2014 for protesting the detention of four human rights attorneys in Jiansanjiang, Heilongjiang province.

In July 2015, the Chinese government considered Xiang Li one of the targets in the 709 crackdown and forbade her to leave the country. She was smuggled out of China and entered Thailand in January 2018, where she was detained in immigration jail in Bangkok for illegal entry. She was granted humanitarian visa to the US in July 2018, but shortly before leaving for the airport on July 23, the immigration jail cancelled her air ticket under pressure from the Chinese government. She managed to board a flight three days later and arrived in the US on July 27, 2018.
