= Xiangli Subdistrict =

Xiangli Subdistrict 项里街道
- Subdistrict
- Location in Jiangsu
- Coordinates: 33°56′33″N 118°17′23″E
- Country: People's Republic of China
- Province: Jiangsu
- Prefecture-level city: Suqian
- District: Sucheng District
- Time zone: UTC+8 (China Standard)

Xiangli Subdistrict (Chinese: 项里街道; pinyin: Xiànglǐ Jiēdào) is a subdistrict in Sucheng District, Suqian, Jiangsu, China. As of 2018, it has 10 residential communities under its administration.

== See also ==
- List of township-level divisions of Jiangsu
