= Ye Haiyan =

Chinese women's rights activist (born 1975)

- 叶海燕
- Born: 25 September 1975 (age 51); Xinzhou, Wuhan, Hubei, China
- Known for: Activism, women's rights in China

Ye Haiyan (born 1975) is a Chinese women's rights activist, best known for her actions in favor of prostitutes and children against violence and sexual aggression. She exposed the harsh conditions of local brothels, in which sex workers were sexually and physically abused. She is also well known by the name of Hooligan Sparrow (流氓燕).

== Activism ==
=== Sex workers' rights ===
In 2005, Ye created a website to support sex workers. She said that year marked her first encounter with feminism. In 2006 Ye set up the China Grassroots Women's Rights Workshop in a red-light district in Wuhan to provide support for sex workers and defend their rights. She was not allowed to register the workshop as a non-governmental organization (NGO) by any government agency.

By 2010, Ye's determined writing and advocacy had gained her the trust of better known Chinese artists like Ai Weiwei. In 2011, she moved to Bobai, Guangxi, and founded the Bobai County Duckweed Health Workshop, also with the main aim of helping sex workers. The police and the courts in Bobai "were either hostile or uninterested" when a sex worker was the victim of a crime. In May 2012, Ye was driven to a wall after accumulating debt. The NGO office Ye was using after support in Guangxi was raided by eight plainclothes men who reportedly attacked her. She said after the attack that she presumed the men had been sent by the local government.

In May 2013, she was attacked in her home and arrested for being a whistleblower because she exposed the harsh conditions of local brothels, in which sex workers were sexually and physically abused.

=== Schoolgirls rape case ===
On 27 May 2013, Ye protested against a school director in Hainan accused of raping six female students, aged 11 to 14. This sparked national outrage via Sina Weibo – a microblogging website that is one of the largest social media platforms in China. She held a poster to tell the principal to have a room with her, implying to have sex with her instead of the youth: "Principal, call me if you want to get a room. Leave the pupils alone." Shortly after the release of her online campaigns against these cases of child abuse, Ye was physically attacked in her home by women who she believed to be sent by the local government.

In June 2013, the filmmaker Ai Xiaoming worked together with Ye in her campaign to publicize the case of the six school girls, who were raped by the school principal and a government official. On 6 July 2013, Ye alongside her daughter and boyfriend Ling Huobo, were left abandoned on the side of the road by Guangdong secret agents.

Hooligan Sparrow, a documentary by the Chinese-born American filmmaker Nanfu Wang featuring Ye, was shown at the Sundance Film Festival in 2016. The documentary depicts Ye's 2013 campaign protesting against the school girls rape incident and how Ye and other activists become targets of harassment for these protests and their continuing efforts to raise awareness about the case.

== Personal life ==
Ye's activism has exposed the authorities and school officials but has had a negative effect on her daughter because schools are not willing to enroll her.

Ye and her daughter have also reported to be victims of several physical assault incidents following Ye's campaigns against child abuse. In an incident in Guangxi during May 2013, Ye defended her home and daughter against a group of women believed to be sent by the government, resulting in her administrative detainment for, the police claimed with allegedly falsified evidence, injuring three of her attackers. Ye and her family faced harassment following her release, and eventually had to leave their home and reside in the Guangdong province.
