= Nanfu Wang =

Chinese-born American filmmaker (b. 1985)

- 王男栿
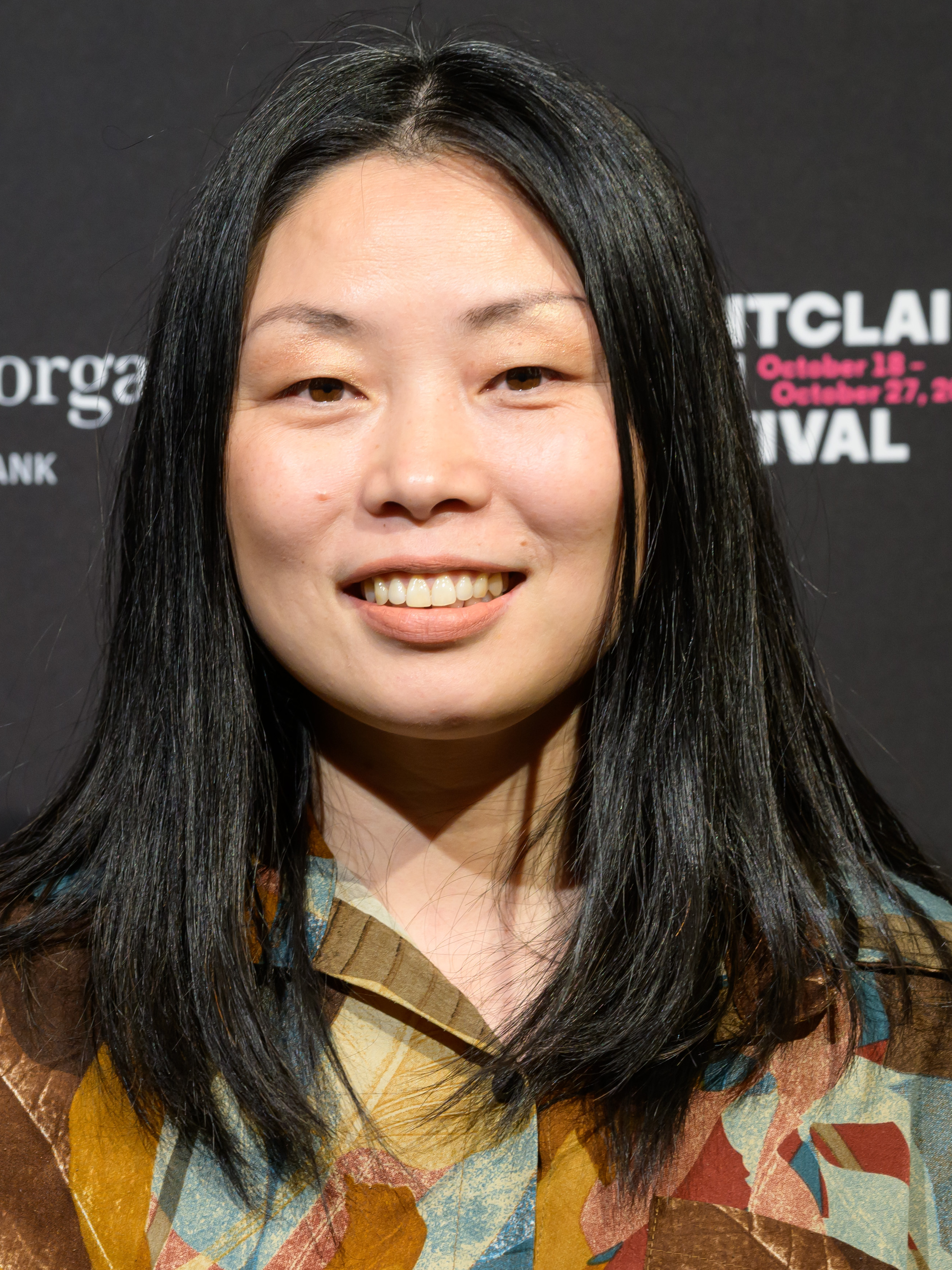
- Wang at the 2024 Montclair Film Festival
- Born: 1985 (age 40–41); Jiangxi, China
- Occupation: Documentary filmmaker

Chinese name
- Chinese: 王男栿
Transcriptions
Standard Mandarin
- Hanyu Pinyin: Wáng Nánfú
- IPA: [wǎŋ nǎn.fǔ]

Nanfu Wang (born 1985) is a Chinese-born American film director, producer, and editor. Her debut film Hooligan Sparrow premiered at the 2016 Sundance Film Festival and was shortlisted for the Academy Award for Best Documentary Feature in 2017. Her second film, I Am Another You, premiered at SXSW Film Festival in 2017 and won two special jury awards, and her third film, One Child Nation, won the Grand Jury Prize for Documentary Feature at the 2019 Sundance Film Festival. Wang is the recipient of a 2021 Vilcek Prize for Creative Promise in Filmmaking, from the Vilcek Foundation. Her 2024 documentary feature, titled Night Is Not Eternal, won a Peabody Award at the 85th Annual Ceremony.

== Early life ==
Wang was born in a small, rural farming village in 1985 in Jiangxi Province, China. Her parents named her "Wang Nanfu" (Chinese: 王男栿), as Nan (男) means man and Fu (栿) means pillar in Mandarin, hoping that the girl would grow up strong like a man. She has a younger brother who is several years younger; growing up, she felt ostracized by her classmates for having a sibling as most of her classmates were only children as a result of the one-child policy in place at the time in China. When Wang was 12 years old, (Note: One source reports her age as 11 at the time but Asian cultures sometimes may count age as one year more than Western culture would) her father (33 years old at the time) died from congenital heart disease which their family could not afford to get medical treatment for. She was forced to drop out of school to work so she could support her family. Wang's family could not afford to send both her and her brother to secondary education. Instead, she enrolled herself in a vocational school and eventually started working as a teacher for primary school-age children.

== Education ==
With several years of work experience, Wang studied English literature at a local university's continuing education program. After that, she was granted a full fellowship from Shanghai University while enrolled in a graduate program for English language and literature. Later, she became interested in film while studying at Ohio University and later at New York University. She holds Master's degrees in English Literature (Shanghai University), Media Studies (Ohio University, E. W. Scripps School of Journalism), and Documentary Filmmaking (New York University, Tisch School of the Arts).

== Career and work ==
=== Hooligan Sparrow ===
Hooligan Sparrow was Wang's first feature documentary. It tells the story of Chinese human rights activists, including Ye Haiyan (the titular "Hooligan Sparrow"), fighting to bring accountability to government officials who allegedly sexually assaulted several young girls. As Wang films the activists, she herself becomes the subject of harassment from state actors responding to her efforts to document the activists' work.

Wang has stated that she created the film because, "I was interested in many, many topics like the healthcare system and the educational system in China because I didn't go to high school or college in China. Another topic that interested me was sex workers because, like I said, I grew up in a village and I had seen a lot of women from the village who didn't have access to education and they end up becoming sex workers because they did not have skills, they did not have education and they were really discriminated against. So, I wanted to make a film about the poorest sex workers in the country, but I also knew that it would be hard to get access to them. I've known Hooligan Sparrow–her name is Ye Haiyan–for a long time through social media, but I had never seen her in person at the time."

When creating the film Wang was not aware that this would make her a target for government surveillance, later stating that she "knew very little about the activist world". Wang has noted that her family and friends were followed and interrogated by officers who questioned whether or not they knew her, her whereabouts, and her current actions.

=== One Child Nation ===
Her 2019 documentary One Child Nation examines the consequences of China's one-child policy, which was implemented from 1979 to 2015.

=== In the Same Breath ===
Her 2021 documentary In the Same Breath looks at how the Chinese government and the American government reacted to the outbreak of the COVID-19 pandemic.

=== Mind Over Murder ===
Wang directed Mind Over Murder, a 2022 documentary which examined the case of the Beatrice Six, a group of six individuals falsely found guilty of the rape and murder of a Nebraska woman.

=== Night Is Not Eternal ===
Wang directed the documentary Night Is Not Eternal, which follows Rosa María Payá Acevedo over the course of several years, and premiered November 2024 on HBO.

== Major contributions and awards ==
Wang's film Hooligan Sparrow screened at festivals in over 25 countries including Sundance, Hot Docs, Sheffield DocFest, Full Frame, and Human Rights Watch Film Festival. Her film I Am Another You premiered at SXSW in 2017 and won the LUNA / Chicken & Egg Award for Best Documentary Feature directed by a woman and the SXSW Special Jury Award for Excellence in Documentary Storytelling. Wang is a recipient of the Sundance Institute Documentary Fund and Bertha / Britdoc Journalism Fund as well as a Sundance-supported and IFP-supported filmmaker. Hooligan Sparrow was placed on the shortlist for the Academy Award for Best Documentary Feature Film at the 2016 Oscars. Wang was honored by the International Documentary Association with the 2016 Emerging Filmmaker Award. Her third feature, One Child Nation, won the Grand Jury Prize for Documentary Feature at the 2019 Sundance Film Festival. Wang was awarded a 2021 Vilcek Prize for Creative Promise in Filmmaking by the Vilcek Foundation, "for the impact and courage of her riveting documentaries".

Wang was one of 21 recipients of the MacArthur Fellowship in 2020.

In 2021 she was selected as a Jury member for the BIFF Mecenat Award at the 26th Busan International Film Festival to be held in October.

In December 2021, she was included in the list of BBC's 100 Women of 2021.

== Personal life ==
Wang is married and mother of two boys (born c. 2017 and 2022). She resides in New Jersey.
