= Duan Weihong =

Chinese billionaire

- Born: 29 December 1966 (age 59)
- Education: Nanjing University of Science and Technology (BS)
- Known for: business partner of the Wen Jiabao family
- Spouse: Desmond Shum (married 2004–2015)
- Children: 1 son

Duan Weihong (Chinese: 段伟红; pinyin: Duàn Wěihóng; born December 29, 1966), also known as Whitney Duan, is a Chinese billionaire. She is known as a business partner of the family of former Chinese premier Wen Jiabao. Duan was secretly detained in 2017 and resurfaced in 2023.

According to the memoir written by her ex-husband Desmond Shum titled Red Roulette, Duan cultivated extensive political and business connections in China, especially with Zhang Peili, Wen's wife. Duan was secretly detained on 5 September 2017, widely believed to be a result of a power struggle at the highest levels of the Chinese Communist Party. Shum believed that her detention had been ordered by Xi Jinping or someone in Xi's inner circle. Duan is said to have fallen victim to the Chinese Communist Party's use of "extralegal kidnappings" to facilitate opaque investigations. Shortly before Red Roulette was published, Shum received a call from Duan—her first contact with the outside world since her disappearance in 2017—asking him to cancel the publication out of concern for their son's safety. Shum refused, believing she was under duress to make the phone call.

== See also ==
- Operation Fox Hunt
- Jack Ma
- Ren Zhiqiang
- Sun Dawu
