= Desmond Shum =

Chinese author

- 沈棟
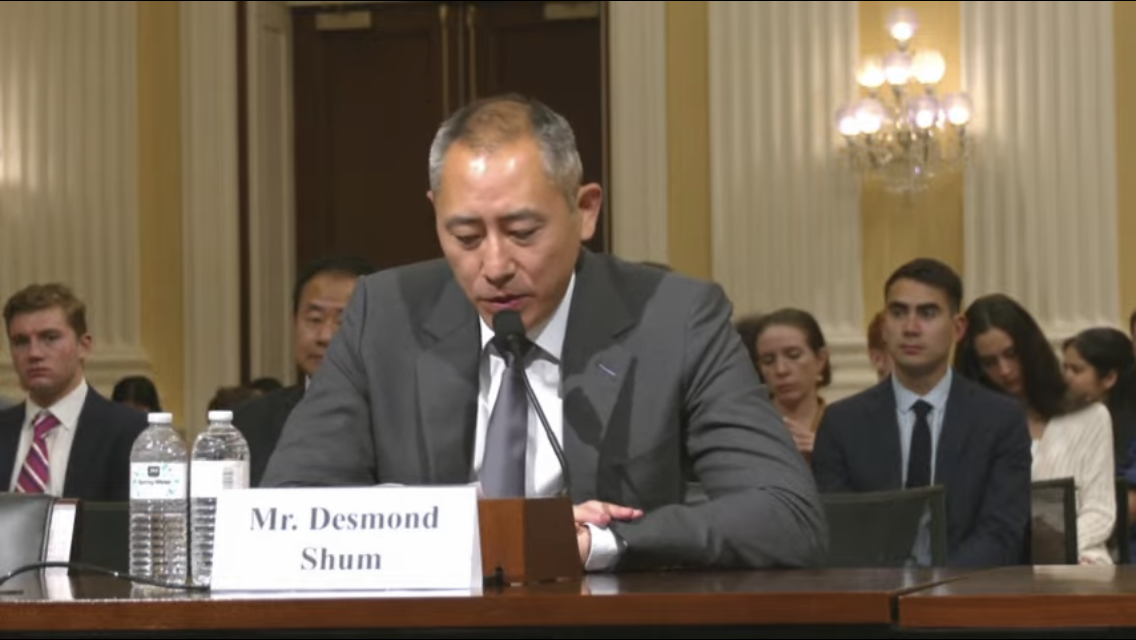
- Born: Shanghai
- Other name: Tung Shum
- Citizenship: Hong Kong
- Education: BBA, University of Wisconsin–Madison; EMBA, Northwestern University & Hong Kong University of Science and Technology
- Alma mater: Queen's College, Hong Kong
- Occupation: businessman
- Notable work: Red Roulette
- Spouse: Duan Weihong (married 2004-2015)
- Partner: Ci Sun
- Children: 1 son

Desmond Shum (Chinese: 沈棟; b. November 1968), born in Shanghai, is a Hong Kong businessman. He is known for his memoir Red Roulette (2021), in which he recounts the rise and fall of himself and his ex-wife Duan Weihong, a business partner of the Wen Jiabao family.

== Life ==
Shum was born in Shanghai during the Cultural Revolution. His father, a Chinese teacher, bore the political stigma of coming from a family of landowning gentry, classified under the Five Black Categories. His mother was spared from political persecution due to her overseas family background, which provided foreign currency for China's then-closed economy. Shum's paternal grandfather had been a prominent lawyer in pre-revolutionary Shanghai until his firm was shut down by the Communist government in 1952. His maternal grandfather lived in Hong Kong, which enabled Shum and his parents to emigrate there in 1978. Shum attended the Queen's College, Hong Kong, where he was a classmate with Andrew Kan Kai-yan, before gaining a bachelor's degree in finance and accounting from the University of Wisconsin-Madison. He later graduated from the joint-EMBA program of Northwestern University and the Hong Kong University of Science and Technology.

After college in the U.S., Shum returned to China in 1995 to work in private equity. He met businesswoman Duan Weihong in 2001, and married her in 2004. They have a son, Ariston, born in 2010 in the United States. The couple cultivated extensive political connections, especially with Zhang Beili, the wife of then-Premier Wen Jiabao, and developed high-profile real estate projects, such as the Beijing Airport Cargo Terminal, China's largest air cargo logistics facility, and the Bulgari Hotel in Beijing. Additionally, beginning in the early 2000s, they became pioneers of philanthropy in China, making extensive donations both domestically and internationally. In 2005, they established the Desmond and Whitney Shum Fellowship at Harvard University’s Fairbank Center for Chinese Studies. Shum was appointed Honorary Trustee of Tsinghua University for his contributions to the construction of the Humanities and Social Sciences Library, the largest library on campus, and the reorganization of the School of Humanities. He also served as a member of the 12th Beijing Municipal Committee of Chinese People's Political Consultative Conference.

In October 2012, The New York Times published an investigation into the estimated $3 billion family wealth of Wen Jiabao, revealing Duan's business ties to the Premier's family. The exposé, which, according to Shum, was based on information provided by Bo Xilai’s faction, strained not only the relationship between Zhang Beili and Duan but also that between Shum and Duan. Shum wanted to reduce risk by moving their investments from China to the overseas open market, but Duan disagreed. After Wen's retirement, amid growing differences in their outlook on Xi's China, the couple divorced in 2015. Shum left China for Oxford, UK with their son.

In 2017, Duan was secretly detained, which Shum believed was ordered by Xi. Since 2018, Shum started planning his memoir, partly because his son, then 8, started searching his mother's name online. In 2021, Shum published Red Roulette: An Insider's Story of Wealth, Power, Corruption, and Vengeance in Today's China (ghost-written by John Pomfret). In the memoir, Shum also confesses to marching against Hong Kong's Umbrella Movement in 2014 but switching sides in 2019. He credits his co-fellow at Aspen Institute, Bill Browder, and his book Red Notice as inspirations. Shortly before Red Roulette was published, Shum's ex-wife Duan called him—her first contact with the outside world since her disappearance in 2017—asking him to cancel the publication out of concern for their son's safety. Shum refused, believing she was under duress to make the phone call. In July 2023, Shum testified in the U.S. Congress about the challenges for U.S. businesses operating in China.
