= Picking quarrels and provoking trouble =

Criminal offence in mainland China

- Simplified Chinese: 寻衅滋事
- Traditional Chinese: 尋釁滋事
Transcriptions
Standard Mandarin
- Hanyu Pinyin: xúnxìn zīshì
- Bopomofo: ㄒㄩㄣˊ ㄒㄧㄣˋ ㄗ ㄕˋ
- Gwoyeu Romatzyh: shyunshinn tzyshyh
- Wade–Giles: hsün^{2}hsin^{4} tzu^{1}shih^{4}

"Picking quarrels and provoking trouble" (simplified Chinese: 寻衅滋事; traditional Chinese: 尋釁滋事; pinyin: xúnxìn zīshì) is a criminal offence in mainland China, codified in the Criminal Law and mirrored in administrative penalties. While initially introduced as a measure to address public order offences, the charge has evolved into a versatile legal tool to deter petitioning and public participation, as well as to control speech and put out dissent. Its breadth, vagueness, and rising penalties have raised concerns in recent years, including calls from scholars and legislators for clearer thresholds, practical restraint, or even repeal.

== Legal framework ==
=== Criminal Law definition ===
"Picking quarrels and provoking trouble" is codified in Article 293 of the Criminal Law of the People's Republic of China, located in Section 1, "Disrupting Public Order" (Articles 277–304), of Chapter VI, "Obstructing Administration of Public Order". Its original maximum penalty was five years imprisonment; a 2011 amendment permits up to ten years where multiple offences or "seriously disrupting public order" are found. The whole Article reads as follows:

Article 293 Whoever commits any of the following acts of provoking troubles, thereby disrupting public order, shall be sentenced to fixed-term imprisonment of not more than 5 years, short-term custody, or non-custodial correction:

1. (1) randomly assaulting another person, where the circumstances are grave;
2. (2) chasing, intercepting, insulting, or threatening another person, where the circumstances are grave;
3. (3) forcibly taking, or arbitrarily damaging or taking into his possession public or private property, where the circumstances are serious; or
4. (4) causing a disturbance in a public place, which leads to serious chaos there.

Whoever gathers others and commits an act as prescribed in the preceding paragraph several times, thereby seriously disrupting public order, shall be sentenced to fixed-term imprisonment of not less than 5 years but not more than 10 years, and may concurrently be fined.

— Article 293 of the Criminal Law of the People's Republic of China

=== Administrative Penalties Law definition ===
"Picking quarrels and provoking trouble" is also regulated under the Law on Penalties for Administration of Public Security. In its latest 2025 revision, which came into force on 1 January 2026, the offence is codified in Article 30 as follows: (Note: It was formerly regulated under Article 26 of the Law on Penalties for Administration of Public Security (2005, amended in 2012), and Article 19(4)(5)(6) of the Regulations on Penalties for Administration of Public Security (1986, amended in 1994, repealed and replaced by the aforementioned in 2006).)

Article 30 Whoever commits any of the following acts shall be detained for not less than 5 days but not more than 10 days or be fined up to 1,000 Chinese yuan; where the circumstances are relatively serious, he shall be detained for not less than 10 days but not more than 15 days and may, be fined up to 2,000 Chinese yuan concurrently:

1. (1) engaging in gang brawls or assaulting others at will;
2. (2) chasing or intercepting others;
3. (3) forcibly taking and obstinately seizing, or willfully damaging and occupying public or private property; or
4. (4) other provocative acts that disturb others and disrupt social order without reasons.

— Article 30 of the Law of the People's Republic of China on Penalties for Administration of Public Security (2025)

=== Judicial interpretations ===
The Supreme People's Court and the Supreme People's Procuratorate of mainland China have issued several judicial interpretations or opinions regarding to "picking quarrels and provoking trouble".

On 15 July 2013, the Supreme People's Court and the Supreme People's Procuratorate issued the "Interpretation on Several Issues Concerning the Application of Law in the Handling of Criminal Cases of Picking Quarrels and Provoking Trouble", defining "public places" as concrete physical venues—stations, docks, airports, hospitals, shopping malls, parks, theatres, exhibitions, sports fields, or similar (Article 5 of the Interpretation)—thereby excluding the internet; it also advised that insults or minor property damage arising from private disputes should generally be excluded from Article 293 (Article 1 of the Interpretation).

On 5 September 2013, the Supreme People's Court and the Supreme People's Procuratorate issued another interpretation, titled "Interpretation on Several Issues Concerning the Application of Law in the Handling of Criminal Cases of Defamation and Other Such Crimes Involving the Use of Information Networks", extending Article 293 to certain online acts, such as "berating or intimidating others", or spreading "defaming information", and introduced a quantitative threshold whereby online defamation becomes criminal if a post is reposted 500 times or viewed 5,000 times.

On 6 February 2020, the Supreme People's Court, the Supreme People's Procuratorate, Ministry of Public Security, and Ministry of Justice issued a joint opinion, titled "Opinions on Punishing Criminal and Illegal Activities that Hinder the Prevention and Control of Novel Coronavirus Pneumonia", proposing to "severely punish" acts that "hinder epidemic control", expressly naming both "making up or intentionally spreading false information" and "picking quarrels and provoking trouble on the internet" as charge paths, and directing that non-criminal conduct be handled with administrative penalties.

== Early history ==
=== From "hooliganism" to the current form ===
"Picking quarrels and provoking trouble" originated from the vague and capacious offence "hooliganism" (Chinese: 流氓罪; pinyin: liúmáng zuì). Emerged in the Mao era, it was used against both perceived social ills and dissent. A 1950 Party directive defined "hooligans" as those who lived on morally questionable means without fixed residence or work and were prescribed to three years of imprisonment. It then quickly deteriorated into a flexible political charge during the Campaign to Suppress Counterrevolutionaries from 1950 to 1953, when a substantial number of individuals labelled as "counterrevolutionaries" were classified as "hooligans", including former Republican officials, religious leaders, and local notables. Of the 710,000 people executed during the "counterrevolutionaries campaign", over 240,000 were put to death under the pretext of "hooliganism". After the 1957 "Anti-Rightist Campaign", "hooligans" were officially classified as "bad elements" (Chinese: 坏分子; pinyin: huài fènzǐ), one of the "Five Black Categories" that were considered state enemies.

The 1979 Criminal Code codified "hooliganism" in Article 160 with an open‑ended "other hooligan activities" clause; crime by analogy remained permissible, thus preserving wide discretion. In the 1983–1986 "Strike Hard" campaigns, a 1984 joint interpretation expanded "other hooligan acts" to include "womanising" and "seducing foreigners", and practice reached into private morality such as dance parties and premarital sex, with mens rea diluted to "wrongful thoughts". After 4 June 1989, the label was used to jail lesser‑known protesters, illustrating its continued political pliability.

The 1997 Criminal Law abolished the offence "hooliganism" entirely, explicitly banned crime by analogy, and split the former catch‑all into five specific offences, including "picking quarrels and provoking trouble" (Article 293).

=== Early applications ===
Rationalisation and discipline were sought by regulators after the 1997 Criminal Law recoding. In 2008, standards were made for the clarification of the sub‑categories of this charge as well as what could be counted as "serious circumstances". During the Hu–Wen years, the charge typically targeted offline actions around 'mass incidents' rather than online speech. A noted example was the 2008 milk‑scandal campaigner Zhao Lianhai, who received two‑and‑a‑half years in 2010 after convicted for this charge. Courts might also show some restraints during this period as one case ruled by a Handan intermediate court in 2012 dismissed a 'picking quarrels and provoking trouble' charge against a persistent petitioner for lack of criminal intent.

== Current practice ==
=== Online speech inclusion and early crackdowns ===
On 19 August 2013, during a national propaganda work conference, General Secretary of the Chinese Communist Party Xi Jinping reportedly warned that ‘a small group of reactionary intellectuals’ were using the internet to ‘spread rumours’, ‘attack Party leadership’, and ‘smear the socialist system’, and thus must be ‘strictly punished’. On the same day, the Beijing police detained online microblogger Qin Huohuo and Lierchaisi, labelling them as rumour-makers who ‘fabricated news’, ‘distorted facts’, and ‘created incidents online’. Soon after, in September 2013, Yang Zhong (also identified as Yang Hui), a 16-year-old from Zhangjiachuan, Gansu, was detained for seven days on suspicion of ‘picking quarrels and provoking trouble’ after questioning the police’s account of a karaoke club manager’s death. This became two notable prelude cases prior to the September 2013 interpretation that issued by the Supreme People’s Court and the Supreme People’s Procuratorate that expanded the scope of ‘picking quarrels and provoking trouble’ to online speech (see above) and thus laid the legal basis for prosecutions in the subsequent broader rumour crackdown. Qin was eventually sentenced to three years in prison on 17 April 2014 for slander and ‘picking quarrels and provoking trouble’, consolidating that social media posts alone could constitute the offence.

Concurrently, since the abolition of the extrajudicial ‘re-education through labour’ system in 2013, there has been an observed increase in the use of criminal detention under charges including ‘picking quarrels and provoking trouble’ to silence activists, petitioners, and civil society figures. Rights activist Cao Shunli, detained in September 2013 and later charged with this offence, died in custody in March 2014 after being denied timely medical care, underscoring the charge’s use to hold dissidents in prolonged detention with harsh conditions.

In May 2014, as the 25th anniversary of the Tiananmen Square crackdown drew nearer, dozens of noted individuals were detained on public-order charges such as ‘picking quarrels and provoking trouble’ amid a wide-ranging security clampdown. Notably, human rights lawyer Pu Zhiqiang was arrested after attending a private Tiananmen memorial seminar and was eventually charged solely based on seven of his postings on Weibo from 2011–2014. Pu was put on trial in late 2015 as prosecutors built the case entirely on his social media posts, and he was convicted of ‘picking quarrels and provoking trouble’ (and ‘inciting ethnic hatred’) with a three-year suspended sentence.

=== Gradually widened use across fields ===
The scope of ‘picking quarrels and provoking trouble’ continued to expand as part of a broader, hardline turn under the general secretaryship of Xi Jinping. It was gradually becoming an excessively flexible tool to suppress activism across fields.

Notable crackdowns in 2015 included the ‘Feminist Five’ who were first pre-emptively detained in March under the charge of ‘picking quarrels and provoking trouble’, before being released on bail a month later. Then on 9 July 2015, an unprecedented nationwide sweep of human-rights lawyers and legal activists—later known as the ‘709 crackdown’—saw over 200 individuals detained or questioned within days, many were initially held under ‘picking quarrels and provoking trouble’ or related public-order charges, with some were later escalated to ‘subversion’ charges.

In Xinjiang, a Human Rights Watch report revealed that from 2016 to 2018, ‘picking quarrels and provoking trouble’ was one of the vague and broad charges commonly used to convict Uyghurs and Kazakhs for behaviour that did not constitute a genuine criminal offence, with 87 per cent of 2017 sentences exceeding five years. Testimonies from Xinjiang also described rapid trials and coerced confessions. The later leaked Xinjiang police files saw the charge being used as a tool for long-term incarceration, with highlit cases including Memetali Abdureshid, who was sentenced to 15 years and 11 months for ‘picking quarrels and provoking trouble’ and ‘preparing to carry out terrorist activities’, and farmer Nurmemet Dawut, received 11 years for ‘gathering the public to disturb social order’ and ‘picking quarrels and provoking trouble’.

Petitioners continued to be prominent targets of this charge. Courts and police in multiple provinces used the charge to respond to petition-related collective actions, including petitioning in Beijing or simply to higher-level authorities, or, as seen in one case in 2019, where petitioning in a ‘non-designated location’ was framed as ‘creating disorder in a public place’ and therefore constituted ‘picking quarrels and provoking trouble’.

Online speech was suppressed even beyond the open feed, as remarks posted in chat groups and semi-private digital spaces were also targeted by this charge. Cases in September 2017 saw brief detentions under ‘picking quarrels and provoking trouble’ for ‘insulting’ police checks by a WeChat post or sharing a joke about a senior government official in a WeChat group of less than 500 members; by 2018, reports saw Twitter users in mainland China were given warnings, pressured to post/account deletions, or even landed with detentions under this charge. A crowdsourced spreadsheet compiled by an anonymous activist has documented cases in mainland China from 2013 onwards where people were punished for their online and offline remarks, based on publicly available court records and police notices; by May 2022, the spreadsheet had grown to roughly 2,300 entries, including over 100 tied to Twitter activity, many involving criminal charges like ‘picking quarrels and provoking trouble’.

On the ground, unapproved religious gatherings and symbolic acts were deemed disorderly or offensive and therefore can be prosecuted with or administratively penalised under this charge, as one case in 2018 saw the Early Rain Covenant Church in Chengdu, while its pastor, Wang Yi, was later escalated to ‘inciting subversion’ and ‘illegal business operations’ charges, the church’s congregants and organisers were detained and questioned under ‘picking quarrels and provoking trouble’; symbolic moves like slapping a police dummy, expressing affection for Japan, wearing ‘inappropriate’ cosplay attire (be it Nazi Germany uniforms, Japanese military uniforms, or kimono), placing memorial tablets in a temple for Japanese war criminals, or publicly staging a bondage roleplay scene, can be branded as creating a ‘vicious’ social impact, and therefore ended with this charge criminally or administratively.

During the ‘Sweeping away the Black and Eliminating the Evil’ special campaign, it is recorded that in 2019 alone, 21,546 ‘picking quarrels and provoking trouble’ cases were logged, approximately taking up 20 per cent of the year’s total. Defence attorneys estimated that around 70–80% of their clients charged during the campaign would likely not have been charged outside of it.

During the 2020 Inner Mongolia protests against a new policy reducing Mongolian language instruction, local public security bureaus opened cases and published suspect lists for offences including ‘picking quarrels and provoking trouble’; in Horqin district, one such list contained 129 people.

=== Expansion during the COVID-19 pandemic ===
The COVID years saw an aggressive expansion of ‘picking quarrels and provoking trouble’ being used to police information and speech.

Just ten days into the issuance of the joint opinion calling for ‘severe punishment’ for behaviours ‘hindering epidemic control’ (see above), the authorities had already officially meted out 224 administrative penalties for pandemic-related ‘rumours’. In practice, numerous people were swiftly detained and in many cases criminally charged with and convicted of ‘picking quarrels and provoking trouble’ for their online remarks about the virus, hospital conditions, the government’s response, or simply the Chinese Communist Party and its leaders, as one case in Sanhe, Hebei saw a Weibo user, Zhang Wenfang, receiving a six-month sentence under this charge for only one post of hers on Weibo recounting the sufferings endured by the people of Wuhan following the outbreak. Even discussing the whistleblower, Dr Li Wenliang (whom was later posthumously honoured as a ‘martyr’ by the government), proved risky, as in Xinjiang, Shanxi, a man surnamed ‘Song’ was given ten months in prison for circulating ‘inaccurate information and pictures’ about the death of Dr Li in a private WeChat group.

Similar cases included Zhou Shaoqing, a Tianjin resident, first detained in February 2020, received nine months in November the same year under the very charge after tweeting or reposting about 120 tweets of criticism of the government’s Covid-19 response; the court ruled that he had ‘egregiously damaged social order’, despite having roughly 300 followers; and Sun Jiadong of Zhengzhou, who had only 27 followers when he was detained, was later sentenced to 13 months for his Twitter posts about the CCP, Hong Kong, Taiwan, and Xinjiang. Another example was Huang Genbao who, although detained before the COVID pandemic in May 2019, was affected by the new policies and sentenced to 16 months for ‘picking quarrels and provoking trouble’ for criticising the CCP and its leaders on Twitter.

While this wave of expansion of the use of ‘picking quarrels and provoking trouble’ under the pretext of COVID-19 ‘epidemic control’ mainly targeted at grassroots individuals, high-profile prosecutions existed as shown in the case of Zhang Zhan, a citizen journalist and former lawyer, who had independently reported on the outbreak in Wuhan, was sentenced to four years’ imprisonment for ‘picking quarrels and provoking trouble’ on 28 December 2020. On 13 August 2021, two volunteers, Cai Wei and Chen Mei, were convicted of ‘picking quarrels and provoking trouble’ and sentenced to 15 months in prison for archiving censored articles online. Their project, Terminus2049, had archived about 600 censored articles since 2018 (in which roughly 100 were on COVID-19), before they were captured in April 2020. And in November 2023, documentary filmmaker Chen Pinlin (‘Plato’) was detained under this charge after he uploaded his 77-minute documentary, ‘Ürümqi Road’, which recorded the 2022 ‘white paper’ protests nationwide against COVID-19 restrictions, to YouTube and X (formally ‘Twitter’). Chen was later convicted of ‘picking quarrels and provoking trouble’ and sentenced to three and a half years in January 2025.

=== Mass retraction of court decisions from official database ===
Since its establishment in 2013, the ‘China Judgements Online’ (Chinese: 裁判文书网; pinyin: Cáipàn Wénshū Wǎng) run by the Supreme People’s Court required courts to upload rulings onto it; by August 2020, over 100 million documents had been posted. From early 2021, however, a massive retraction wave was observed as media reported that at least 11 million judgements were taken offline in a three-month campaign under the disguise of ‘migration’. Observers noted that politically sensitive cases, including ‘picking quarrels and provoking trouble’, had disappeared collectively.

The means and scale of this purge wave include: judgements including keywords such as ‘Twitter’, ‘rumour’, and ‘state leader’ were eliminated almost completely; judgements of certain categories were collectively removed, including but not limiting to ‘picking quarrels and provoking trouble’, as one research conducted by Safeguard Defenders saw that by May 2022, searches that had once yielded tens of thousands of ‘picking quarrels and provoking trouble’ cases in 2020 returned 0 results, indicating that the entire category was wiped out; some district courts reportedly delisted all documents of criminal cases; and judgements of sensitive cases were silently retracted even before the purge wave if they attracted media attention, as seen in the case of Luo Daiqing, whom was convicted of ‘picking quarrels and provoking trouble’ for his remarks made overseas when he was studying abroad. Access frictions also grew as a sign-in wall was erected with mandatory local phone number registration was required and hard caps were imposed on retrievable results.

=== Official scrutiny and acknowledgement of abuse ===
In August 2023, a tribunal of the Supreme People’s Court released an investigation report acknowledging that local officials were ‘widely and excessively’ using the charge of ‘picking quarrels and provoking trouble’, especially to criminalise petitioners seeking redress from higher authorities. The tribunal’s investigation found a ‘clear tendency’ to generalise and overuse the charge in the preceding decade, noting it ranked among the top rural offences and disproportionately entrapped young, migrant workers, unemployed, and petitioners, and urged more prudent handling of cases related to petitions.

=== Attempted ‘hurt feelings’ clause insertion in administrative law ===
In August–September 2023, a proposed amendment to the Law on Penalties for Administration of Public Security sought to penalise acts that ‘hurt national feelings’ or ‘undermine the spirit of the Chinese nation’, including wearing certain clothing or publishing certain remarks, with penalties included up to 15 days of administrative detention and fines up to 5,000 yuan. The proposal, which would have codified a phrase once commonly used in diplomatic rhetoric for domestic law enforcement, drew heated public criticism for its vagueness in the undefined notions of ‘national spirit’ and ‘feelings’, arguing that it would allow even more arbitrary and selective enforcement by the police that the ‘picking quarrels’ charge already enabled in practice. However, these most contentious phrases were reconsidered after public outcry and dropped eventually in the final version.

=== Ongoing covert and diverse application ===
Despite being officially acknowledged of abuse by the Supreme People’s Court in 2023, ‘picking quarrels and provoking trouble’ continues to be employed extensively as a versatile tool against a wide spectrum of activities.

A late-emerging pattern links ‘picking quarrels and provoking trouble’ to local government–private business conflicts. Examples included the case of Sun Dawu, whom in 2020 was captured and later prosecuted with and convicted of charges including ‘picking quarrels and provoking trouble’ due to a long-running land dispute between his Dawu Group and a state farm; and in 2023, Guizhou businesswoman Ma Yijiayi, while seeking roughly 220 million yuan in unpaid government project fees, was detained for ‘picking quarrels and provoking trouble’ shortly after rejecting a low settlement. Cases alike prompted a social media account affiliated with the state-run ‘China News Service’ to openly question whether this was an effort to ‘use criminal punishment to resolve debt’.

By November 2024, analysts and legal experts warned of a new, broader, and incentive-driven trend of ‘distant fishing’ (Chinese: 远洋捕捞; pinyin: yuǎnyáng bǔlāo) whereby debt-stressed local authorities were increasingly resorting to reach beyond their jurisdictions to pressure creditors to write off government debts or target private firms for financial gain, invoking charges like ‘picking quarrels and provoking trouble’ to seize assets or coerce settlements therewhile hand down long prison terms in the name of public order, as seen in one noted case where a Shandong businessman owed 230 million yuan by a Guizhou government project sentenced there to 19 years.

Meanwhile, this charge has been continually used to put out dissent—even more covertly, as the judgements of the cases are not being published in the official database any more. This can be seen in the case of Chen Mingyu, whose attending a private dinner celebrating Lai Ching-te’s inauguration incurred her a two-and-a-half-year sentence of ‘picking quarrels and provoking trouble’ in March 2025; or as in the case of Qin X-liang, whose case was referred as ‘one of the top ten politically sensitive cases nationwide’ and claimed to have been ‘supervised by the Ministry of Public Security’ in the 2023 annual work report of the local prosecution office of the Yuexiu district of Guangzhou, went completely silent with no media coverage at home or abroad.

High-profile convictions also continued as seen in the re-imprisonment of Zhang Zhan, whom was released in May 2024 after serving her 2020 conviction just to be re-detained again three months later in August 2024 and received four more years in September 2025 for another ‘picking quarrels and provoking trouble’ conviction.

== Public reactions and opinions ==
Lawyers, legal experts, and rights groups have repeatedly criticised ‘picking quarrels and provoking trouble’ as a vaguely defined, ‘catch-all’ offence, a ‘pocket crime’ that ‘anything can be stuffed into it’, and a ‘generic charge’ convenient for detaining activists; they argue that its breadth weakens mens rea thresholds, makes defence work difficult, and facilitates selective targeting of dissent, online expression, and non-criminal contention.

It has provoked several intense public reactions. One example would be the 2013 week-long detention of a 16-year-old for ‘picking quarrels and provoking trouble’, which had triggered a visible backlash, with over 10,000 supportive remarks posted online (many were swiftly deleted), volunteered defence offered from lawyers, commentary calling the ‘rumour’ drive as suppressing normal speech, and public figures, including novelist Yu Hua, openly argued for restraint. And the attempted ‘hurt feelings’ clauses insertion in 2023 also faced with widespread public outcry and criticism which eventually led to the clauses being dropped.

Academic analyses see the expansion of ‘picking quarrels and provoking trouble’ as an instrumentally ‘legalist’, ‘more consolidated’ repression under Xi Jinping, as it is preferred over explicit national-security charges for everyday dissent precisely because of its breadth and low evidentiary bar in practice. Empirical political-legal analysis has observed a shift ‘from sporadic harassment to criminalisation’, alongside a marked fall in ‘endangering state security’ charges (Chinese: 危害国家安全罪; pinyin: wēihài guójiā ānquán zuì) that analysts attributed to the re-labelling under charges like this one.

Prominent voices within the establishment have urged narrowing the use or even a complete repealment. In 2019, National People’s Congress delegate and senior lawyer Liu Shoumin warned that the offence had become a ‘catch-all’, urged standardising application, argued that grievance-driven petitioning should be excluded, and insisted that any ‘disturbance’ created via online speech must translate into severe disruption in a physical public place before constituting the offence; he grounded his critique in the principle of legality and submitted a formal proposal during the ‘Two Sessions’ of that year. In 2022’s ‘Two Sessions’, National People’s Congress delegate Xiao Shengfang and Chinese People’s Political Consultative Conference member Zhu Zhengfu submitted separate proposals calling for the repealment of the offence, branding it as vague, unpredictable, and prone to selective enforcement.

A 2022 study of over 13,000 Shanghai court judgements from 2020 found the offence pervasive in the ‘plea leniency system’ (Chinese: 认罪认罚从宽制度; pinyin: rènzuì rènfá cóngkuān zhìdù), with inconsistent pre-trial outcomes and a strong carceral tilt notwithstanding the system’s mitigation goals; the author characterises it as a ‘pocket crime’ with deliberately obfuscated language. Another work on policing strategy in 2023 describes it as a ‘forward-leaning policing’ (Chinese: 前倾式警务; pinyin: qiánqīngshì jǐngwù) posture, supported by a broad ‘social dangerousness’ arrest threshold and a criminal–administrative binary system that channels incivilities to administrative detention and more sensitive matters to criminal prosecution under this label, with routinised use against online speech. Pandemic-era analysis notes a focus on the speaker’s subjective ‘harm’ to political values rather than content truthfulness, aided by special reporting channels for ‘harmful political information’.

Several syntheses emphasise on the charge-stacking phenomenon and a ‘gateway/fallback’ role of this offence—initially applying this charge to secure detention, then escalating to, or substituting from, graver counts (as seen in the cases of Ou Biaofeng, Yu Wensheng, Li Qiaochu, and Huang Xueqin, all escalated to ‘inciting subversion’ charges in later phases); they also observed its rising penalties and supplementary use alongside other offences; one study argues that, paradoxically, heightened legalism has expanded arbitrariness and re-introduced a hooliganism-like pretext under a legal form.

== Notable cases ==
- Zhao Lianhai: convicted of ‘picking quarrels and provoking trouble’ and sentenced to two-and-a-half years in November 2010 for campaigning for the victims of the 2008 milk‑scandal.
- Qin Huohuo: sentenced to three years in prison in April 2014 for slander and ‘picking quarrels and provoking trouble’ for ‘spreading false information’ online.
- Cao Shunli: detained in September 2013 after her two-month-long sit-in protest outside mainland China’s Foreign Ministry; charged with ‘picking quarrels and provoking trouble’ in October; died in custody in March 2014.
- Pu Zhiqiang: detained in May 2014 for attending a private seminar commemorating the 25th anniversary of the Tiananmen Square crackdown, then charged with ‘picking quarrels and provoking trouble’ for his seven Weibo posts; convicted in December 2015 with a three-year suspended sentence.
- The ‘Feminist Five’: five women’s rights activists were detained pre-emptively for a month in March–April 2015 for their prepared anti–sexual harassment campaign; they were investigated first for ‘picking quarrels and provoking trouble’, then for ‘organising a crowd to disturb public order’.
- Nie Zhanye (Chinese: 聂占业), an oil-field worker from Dunhuang was convicted in January 2015 of ‘picking quarrels and provoking trouble’ for posting poems and articles online that honoured the victims of the 1989 Tiananmen crackdown. He was given a three-year suspended sentence.
- Guo Feixiong: received six years in prison in November 2015 for ‘gathering a crowd to disrupt order in a public place’ and an additional charge of ‘picking quarrels and provoking trouble’, added by the judge on the morning of sentencing in court, for his displaying of banners and calling on officials to disclose their assets in a protest. After being detained again in 2021 while trying to fly to the United States to visit his dying wife, he was sentenced again in May 2023 to another eight years in prison, this time for ‘inciting subversion of state power’.
- Wang Jing (Chinese: 王晶), a volunteer journalist for the independent news website 64 Tianwang, was sentenced to almost five years in prison in April 2016 for ‘picking quarrels and provoking trouble’, after publishing stories that allegedly ‘defamed’ government agencies.
- The case of ‘4 June memorial liquor’ (Chinese: 六四酒案; pinyin: liùsì jiǔ àn) saw four men in Chengdu, Fu Hailu (Chinese: 符海陆), Luo Fuyu (Chinese: 罗富誉), Zhang Junyong (Chinese: 张隽勇), and Chen Bing (Chinese: 陈兵), were captured in May–June 2016 for creating and distributing liquor bottles to commemorate the 27th anniversary of the Tiananmen crackdown. The product was called ‘Eight Liquor Six Four’ (Chinese: 八酒六四; pinyin: bājiǔliùsì), a homophone in Mandarin references to the date 4 June 1989, and the label on bottle referenced the ‘Tank Man’ image, marked with ‘64 per cent’, a ‘27-year aging period’, and the phrase ‘never forget, never give up’. All four were ultimately found guilty of ‘picking quarrels and provoking trouble’ in April 2019, with Chen Bing receiving a sentence of three and a half years.
- Protest trackers Lu Yuyu (Chinese: 卢昱宇) and Li Tingyu (Chinese: 李婷玉), who documented protests across mainland China, were arrested in June 2016 and convicted of ‘picking quarrels and provoking trouble’ in June 2017. Lu was sentenced to four years in prison while Li reportedly confessed and received a suspended sentence.
- Wang Jiangfeng (Chinese: 王江峰), a petitioner from Shandong, was sentenced to 22 months in prison in April 2017 for ‘picking quarrels and provoking trouble’ after calling Xi Jinping a ‘baozi’ and Mao Zedong a ‘communist bandit’ in WeChat.
- Xu Lin (Chinese: 徐琳), a singer-songwriter from Guangzhou, was sentenced to three years for ‘picking quarrels and provoking trouble’ in December 2018 for his songs mourning Liu Xiaobo and online posts described as ‘insulting the state leader’; the court’s judgement stated that his actions caused ‘adverse social impacts’ and a ‘serious disturbance to public order’.
- Chen Jieren: former state media journalist, received 15 years in April 2020 for ‘picking quarrels and provoking trouble’ and other offences; the judgement stated that he had ‘attacked and vilified the Communist Party and government’ by publishing ‘false information’ and ‘malicious speculation’ on his blogs and other social media accounts, operated an ‘evil force group’ with his ex-wife and others, and illicitly accrued 7.3 million yuan.
- Zhang Jialong: former QQ.com journalist, received 18 months for ‘picking quarrels and provoking trouble’ for tweets that allegedly ‘defamed the image’ of the Chinese Communist Party and expressed support for activists and dissidents.
- The case of Terminus2049 (Chinese: 端点星事件; pinyin: duāndiǎnxīng shìjiàn): Volunteers behind the Terminus2049 project that had archived about 600 censored articles since 2018 were detained in April 2020. Two of them, Cai Wei (Chinese: 蔡伟) and Chen Mei (Chinese: 陈玫), were eventually convicted of ‘picking quarrels and provoking trouble’ in August 2021 and were sentenced to 15 months in prison. During detention, their family-hired lawyers were denied access, with officially appointed counsel represented them.
- Li Sixia (Chinese: 李思侠), an engineer who campaigned for a decade against pollution from two stone processing factories in her home village in Shaanxi, was convicted of ‘picking quarrels and provoking trouble’ in June 2019 and sentenced to two and a half years in prison. In an unusual reversal, however, an intermediate court overturned Li Sixia’s conviction in July 2020 and ordered a retrial. In August 2020, the prosecution requested to withdraw the case entirely, stating that it ‘did not meet the conditions for prosecution’. Li was detained during this entire process for a total of 638 days.
- Wang Meiyu (Chinese: 王美余) of Hunan, who openly called for Xi Jinping to step down and a real election to be held, was detained for ‘picking quarrels and provoking trouble’ on 8 July 2019 in Hengyang. On 23 September 2019, his family was informed that he died suddenly in custody in a military hospital. The local officials were later said to have proposed a compensation of 2.98 million yuan to his family in exchange for them pursuing no further investigation.
- Sun Dawu: detained in November 2020 (with more than a dozen executives of his Dawu Group and his sons), received 18 years in prison and a fine of 3.11 million yuan after convicted on multiple counts including ‘picking quarrels and provoking trouble’, due to a land dispute with a state farm and his subsequent public criticism of officials.
- Lin Shengliang: detained by Shenzhen police in May 2017 on suspicion of "picking quarrels and provoking trouble" after he disseminated slogans such as "Go on Twitter, follow Guo Wengui" on shared bicycles, public facilities, and online platforms in several locations in Shenzhen.
- Zhang Zhan: first sentenced to four years’ imprisonment in December 2020 for ‘picking quarrels and provoking trouble’ over her reporting on the COVID-19 outbreak in Wuhan; then sentenced to another four years in September 2025 for another ‘picking quarrels and provoking trouble’ count for, according to the indictment, her posts on X (formerly ‘Twitter’) and YouTube that ‘seriously damaged the country’s image’.
- In late December 2021, a court in Pingdingshan, Henan sentenced five members of a ultra-leftists group, the ‘Red Culture Association’, to 9–24 months for ‘picking quarrels and provoking trouble’ for circulating more than 100 WeChat articles that ‘smeared’ former reformist leaders including Deng Xiaoping; the judgement labelled them as an ‘evil force’ gang.
- In July 2022, a 31-year-old woman named Wu Aping (Chinese: 吴啊萍) was detained in Nanjing for ‘picking quarrels and provoking trouble’ after it was discovered that she had paid a Buddhist temple to host memorial tablets for Japanese war criminals; the abbot of the temple and local religious affairs officials were subsequently dismissed, and inspections were triggered into Buddhist associations.
- Fang Bin: disappeared in February 2020 after posting videos from Wuhan showing overcrowded hospitals and bodies during the initial COVID-19 outbreak; sentenced to three years in prison for ‘picking quarrels and provoking trouble’.
- Hao Jinsong: sentenced to nine years in prison for fraud and ‘picking quarrels and provoking trouble’ in July 2023; indictment accused him of using multiple social media accounts to repost and comment on topics, ‘some of which included false information’, which had caused ‘confusion’.
- Chen Pinlin (Chinese: 陈品霖, ‘Plato’) was sentenced to three and a half years in January 2025 for his 77-minute documentary, ‘Ürümqi Road’, which documented the nationwide 2022 ‘white paper’ protests against COVID-19 restrictions.
- Chen Mingyu (Chinese: 陈明玉) of Chongqing was sentenced to two and a half years in March 2025 for ‘picking quarrels and provoking trouble’ after she attended a private dinner celebrating Lai Ching-te’s inauguration as the President of the Republic of China.

== See also ==
- Law of the People’s Republic of China
- Document Number Nine
- Xi Jinping Thought on the Rule of Law
- Hooliganism (Soviet Union and Russia)
- Public-order crime
- List of Chinese dissidents
- Disorderly conduct
