= Zhang Jialong =

Chinese journalist

Zhang Jialong (simplified Chinese: 张贾龙; traditional Chinese: 張賈龍; pinyin: Zhāng Jiǎlóng, born May 22, 1988, in Guiyang, Guizhou Province) is a Chinese journalist, blogger and a former editor of Tencent Finance.

== Biography ==
He graduated from Inner Mongolia University in 2010 where he majored in history, stumbled on his first job and became a journalist.

He reported for the financial news magazine Caijing about the forceful demolition of artist Ai Weiwei's workshop in Shanghai. He also covered Zhao Lianhai, a father whose son was a victim of melamine-tainted milk formula, and other rights defenders.

In April, 2011, he was interrogated by Beijing police for 24 hours, and his home ransacked, for tweeting "today on taxi the driver said that two third of taxi drivers in Beijing will stage a strike during the May First holidays." He was subsequently given a 10-day administrative detention for "posting false information on an overseas website Twitter that was retweeted 37 times and caused disruption of social order."

The incident was listed as a "significant, particularly sensitive case" by the criminal detection squad of the public transportation unit of Beijing Municipal Public Security Bureau, and he was called by the Beijing police a "dangerous element" who "incited a strike online" and "attempted to provoke disruptions and harm the capital city's public transportation order."

=== Meeting with John Kerry and aftermath ===
On February 15, 2014, Zhang was invited to be one of four Chinese bloggers to meet with United States Secretary of State John Kerry during his China trip.

At the 40-minute meeting on Feb. 15, Zhang asked Mr. Kerry "Will you get together with the Chinese who aspire for freedom" and help "tear down this Great Firewall that blocks the Internet". Zhang also asked Mr. Kerry to look into reports that American companies had helped the Chinese government establish controls over what websites Chinese citizens could access.

Zhang said the situation for political and human rights activists has not improved. He was worried about "prisoners of conscience," specifically Xu Zhiyong, a human-rights activist who was sentenced last month to four years in prison, and Liu Xiaobo, a writer and activist who was imprisoned after being charged with "inciting subversion of state power." While in prison, Mr. Liu was awarded the 2010 Nobel Peace Prize.

Zhang wanted to know if Mr. Kerry would visit Liu Xia, wife of Liu Xiaobo, who had been under house arrest since his Nobel Prize win and who, he had heard, was suffering from illnesses. The secretary of state said that the issue of Chinese political prisoners was brought up every time he met with the Chinese officials. Mr. Kerry did not directly respond to that appeal but noted he was only here for a day and a half.

On February 16, the Chinese propaganda authorities ordered all web portals to delete reports about "the U.S. Secretary of State meeting with four Chinese social media big Vs to talk about 'Internet freedom'".

Meanwhile, his name became a sensitive word on Tencent Weibo. Though he could still log in his Weibo account and post, but a search for his name would yield "search result cannot be displayed according to relevant laws, regulations and policies."

On February 19, upon invitation by the Foreign Policy website, Zhang wrote an article spelling out everything he would like to say to Mr. Kerry. He said, "Since 1949, Chinese dictators have robbed their people of their freedom, forcing the country's citizens to live in fear. China's people are still unable to freely access the World Wide Web. For many years, Chinese who aspire to freedom have spilled their blood and sweat fighting for it. Chinese people will continue to try to push down every wall erected by their dictatorial government, but if the United States could help in the effort to tear down China's notorious Great Firewall, it would help China realize internet freedom sooner." He also called on the U.S. to implement visa sanctions on those who contributed to creating the GFW, such as Fang Binxing, the father of Great Firewall.

On May 20, he was notified by the department head at Tencent that he was being suspended, citing radical expressions he made in his meeting with the U.S. Secretary of State John Kerry and the propaganda directives he publicized online. He was told that he would receive a final decision after Tencent coordinated with the propaganda authorities. On May 23, Tencent's HR department notified him of the termination of his labor contract for "leaking business secrets and other confidential and sensitive information."

On May 30, The U.S. has expressed deep concern about the reported firing of a Chinese blogger who had met with Secretary of State John Kerry and urged the U.S. to challenge China's Internet restrictions. The State Department said it would be very troubling if a private employee was fired for publicly expressing his views. The U.S. also voiced concern over China's "continuing crackdown" on free speech.
