= Red Roulette =

2021 memoir by Desmond Shum

Red Roulette: An Insider's Story of Wealth, Power, Corruption, and Vengeance in Today's China
- Author: Desmond Shum
- Language: English
- Subject: Biography
- Set in: China
- Publisher: Simon & Schuster UK
- Publication date: 2021
- Publication place: United Kingdom
- Pages: 320
- ISBN: 1398509906
- OCLC: 1236258870
- Dewey Decimal: 920.051
- LC Class: DS774.C3718

Red Roulette: An Insider’s Story of Wealth, Power, Corruption, and Vengeance in Today’s China is a 2021 memoir by Desmond Shum (ghost-written by John Pomfret).

== Background ==
Shum divorced after Duan in 2015 and left China for the UK with their son. In 2017, Duan was secretly detained, which Shum believed was ordered by Wang Qishan in relation to the investigation of Sun Zhengcai. Since 2018, Shum started planning the memoir, partly because his son, then 8, started searching his mother's name online. In 2021, shortly before the memoir was published, Duan called him—her first contact with the outside world since her disappearance in 2017—asking him to cancel the publication out of concern for their son's safety. Shum refused, believing she was under duress to make the phone call.

== Contents ==
The work discusses how doing favors for other people becomes the backbone of guanxi personal relationships in China, and Palmer stated the "tragedy of those ties" becomes an important thematic element. The book states how Shum and Duan formed a corrupt relationship with Zhang Beili and became wealthy as a result. Blanchette stated that the Zhang Beili connection is in the "heart" of the work.

In Red Roulette, Shum argues that CCP ideology only bent in the 1980s due to major economic pressures, and has since returned to Maoist principles.

== Reception ==
James Palmer of Foreign Policy wrote that the work serves as "one of the very few insider accounts we have of how things get done at the top in China". Palmer explained that Shum, by writing the book and publishing it, went against the omertà of the CCP. Palmer wrote in terms of the author's assessment of himself within the work, as Shum was someone previously pro-CCP who later turned against the party, "unusually honest—though not completely frank".

Jude Blanchette of the Washington Post called the work "a remarkable indictment of the Chinese Communist Party" and "a rare bona fide insider account". Blanchette wrote that the CCP is depicted in the work as being "the epitome of capitalist excess". Blanchette added that the work shows that actual decisions go through "informal interactions" between key power brokers, with official meetings being for show; he stated that this "highlight[s] the limitations of more formalistic analysis of China’s political system."

Publishers Weekly gave the book a starred review and stated that the book has an "enthralling" critique of the CCP and "is imbued with an aura of inevitable tragedy".

Kirkus Reviews described the book as "riveting".
