= Dong Yaoqiong =

Chinese Dissident

Dong Yaoqiong (Chinese: 董瑶琼; pinyin: Dǒng Yáoqióng; born 1989), also referred to as the 'Ink Girl' (Chinese: 泼墨女孩; pinyin: Pōmò nǚhái) in the media, is a Chinese woman who in July 2018 drew international attention through a video posted on her Twitter account with the handle "@feefeefly". The video showed her splashing ink at a poster of General Secretary of the Chinese Communist Party Xi Jinping in Shanghai, and denouncing his rule as a "tyranny". She was subsequently committed to a psychiatric hospital at least twice.

== Biography ==
Dong previously lived in Shanghai and was born and raised in Zhuzhou, Hunan province, People's Republic of China. Before her disappearance, she had been working as a realty agent and had been a dissident in China for a while.

== Ink splashing incident ==
Dong went incommunicado from 4 July 2018 after uniformed men visited her apartment on the same day that she streamed live video from the square of HNA Group headquarters in Shanghai. The video showed her criticizing what she described as the Chinese Communist Party (CCP)-style Dictatorship, authoritarianism as well as brainwashing process imposed on Chinese people. She is also shown splashing ink on a poster of Xi Jinping, General Secretary of the CCP, whom she called a dictator on social media. In what appeared to be her last posting on Twitter before her disappearance, Dong wrote:

Right now there are a group of people wearing uniforms outside my door. I'll go out after I change my clothes. I did not commit a crime. The people and groups that hurt me are the ones who are guilty.

— feefeefly

An artist with an assumed name in Beijing complimented @feefeefly on what he saw as her brave behaviour of daring to criticize the CCP for its wrongdoings that busted out the bubble of its deification.

== Hospital stays and alleged second video ==
After the incident, Dong was committed as a psychiatric patient to a Zhuzhou hospital. Her father was detained when trying to visit her.

On 9 September 2018, the website Boxun reported that officials had ordered the hospital to quietly feed Dong poison over a prolonged period of time, aiming for her to die while in hospital and never be discharged alive. However, Chinese Human Rights Defenders reported on 3 January 2020 that she had been released from hospital in November 2019. Her father alleged that Dong continued to be affected by mental and physical side effects of the medication – Olanzapine – that she had received while in hospital, and suggested that she may have been deliberately exposed to these. Dong spent a second period at the same hospital from May to July 2020. On 30 November 2020, she posted a video on Twitter (whose veracity could not be verified by Hong Kong Free Press as of 2 December 2020) in which she said that her assigned work at a local government office was actually surveillance in the name of work, whose scope merely included typing up documents and making phone calls. She further denounced the restriction on her movements imposed by the authorities, and that she had only been recently able to contact her father, of whose narrow escape from a mining accident she had only learned through activist Ou Biaofeng. She also said that she was on the "brink of breaking down" and that, if she were again hospitalized by the authorities for psychological treatment, she would possibly never be released again. Dong was committed as a psychiatric patient for a third time in February 2021. As of September 2022, there had been no information about her since over a year earlier.

== Arrest and death of her father ==
Her father, Dong Jianbao, was arrested in August 2018, while trying to visit her at Hunan's Zhuzhou Number 3 Hospital. He was later sentenced to three years in prison. In September 2022, it was reported that he had died in prison, and that his body was covered in bruises and wounds. According to a relative, the authorities demanded his body be cremated within five days. Roads leading to the Dong's residence were blocked and multiple people were barred from paying respects at their house.

== Arrest of Ou Biaofeng ==
In early December 2020, after retweeting the November video of Dong, Ou was placed in administrative detention for 15 days for "picking quarrels and provoking trouble". His wife Wei Huanhuan tweeted on 18 December that Ou had been placed in Residential Surveillance at a Designated Location; on 25 December she tweeted that, as per a police letter she had received, Ou had been charged with "subversion of state power". Li Xuewen, a friend of Ou, told the South China Morning Post that he believed that the subversion charge had stemmed from Ou's support for Dong. One of the two government-appointed lawyers of Ou confirmed that he was affiliated with a law firm with ties to the provincial government; the lawyer was dismissive about whether this constituted a conflict of interest, saying that this was a common situation.

== See also ==
- Political repression
- Human rights in China
