= Cao Shunli =

Chinese lawyer and human rights activist

- 曹顺利
- Born: 28 March 1961; Beijing, China
- Died: 14 March 2014 (aged 52); Beijing, China
- Education: Beijing College of Political Science and Law
- Occupations: Lawyer, human rights activist
- Known for: Human rights activism, political prisoner
- Awards: Cao Shunli Memorial Award for Human Rights Defenders, Martin Ennals Award for Human Rights Defenders finalist

Cao Shunli (simplified Chinese: 曹顺利; traditional Chinese: 曹順利; pinyin: Cáo Shùnlì; 28 March 1961 – 14 March 2014) was a Chinese lawyer and human rights activist.

== Early life ==
Cao was born in Beijing, but during the Cultural Revolution (1966–1971) she was forcibly deported along with her family to their ancestral home in Zhaoyuan, Shandong Province as a result of her grandfather being a member of the "enemy classes" according to Chinese Communist Party doctrine of the time. After attending Beijing College of Political Science and Law and a period of post-graduate study she was assigned to work at the research centre of the Ministry of Labor and Human Resources.

== Political activism ==
During the 2002 housing reforms, Cao reported corruption amongst her supervisors and lost her job. Thereafter she became a human rights activist and subsequently served at least two terms in prison camps as a result of her activities.

== Arrest and death ==
Following a two-month sit-in at the Foreign Affairs Ministry as part of a group demanding a national human rights review, in September 2013 Cao planned to attend a training session on human rights held by the International Service for Human Rights in Geneva. However, she was arrested at Beijing Airport, and disappeared for several weeks. In October 2013 she was charged with illegal assembly and picking quarrels and provoking trouble.

Cao was diagnosed with pneumonia in November 2013, and fell into a coma in February 2014, at which point she was transferred to a military hospital in Beijing. Cao died in hospital on 14 March 2014, with her body showing "signs of her mistreatment during approximately five and half months in detention".

A decade after Cao's death, on 14 March 2024, 14 United Nations experts condemned the inaction by Chinese authorities to investigate into Cao's death.

In 2019, activist Chen Jianfang – a protégée of Cao who had likewise been prevented from attending the training session in Switzerland in 2013, but been released after brief detention – penned an essay to mark the fifth anniversary of Cao's death. Chen was detained by authorities on 20 March 2019 and charged with subversion of state power, having been held incommunicado as of October that year.

== Awards ==
Cao was one of three finalists for the 2014 Martin Ennals Award for Human Rights Defenders.

The Cao Shunli Memorial Award for Human Rights Defenders, awarded in her name, was founded by Chinese human rights activists. The award ceremony goes every 14 March in memory of Cao. Human rights activists also said they will commenmorate every 14 March as "Human Rights Defenders Day" to mark the day Cao died.
