= Hao Jinsong =

Legal activist

- 郝劲松
- Born: 1972 (age 53–54); Dingxiang, Xinzhou, Shanxi, China
- Education: China University of Political Science and Law (LL.M)
- Occupations: legal counsel, civil rights activist
- Known for: winning administrative lawsuits and championing the rule of law in China
- Criminal information
- Criminal charges: picking quarrels and provoking trouble, fraud
- Penalty: 9 years in prison; fine of 350,000 Chinese yuan

Details
- Date apprehended: 17 December 2019

Chinese name
- Simplified Chinese: 郝劲松
- Traditional Chinese: 郝勁松
Transcriptions
Standard Mandarin
- Hanyu Pinyin: Hǎo Jìnsōng (Note: The Chinese character ‘劲’ can be pronounced as ‘jìn’ or ‘jìng’. While both are correct in mainland China, with the former being more prevalent; the latter is, however, the only proper pronunciation per Taiwan standard. Therefore, it was annotated as ‘Hǎo Jìnsōng’ in Hanyu Pinyin, and transliterated this way as his name in English since he is a mainland Chinese. But it was annotated as ‘ㄏㄠˇ ㄐㄧㄥˋ ㄙㄨㄥ’ in Bopomofo, and transliterated as ‘Hao Jinq-song’ in Gwoyeu Romatzyh and ‘Hao^{3} Ching^{4}-sung^{1}’ in Wade–Giles since these methods are predominantly used in Taiwan. The IPA annotation has kept the both to respect the pronunciations on both sides.)
- Bopomofo: ㄏㄠˇ ㄐㄧㄥˋ ㄙㄨㄥ
- Gwoyeu Romatzyh: Hao Jinq-song
- Wade–Giles: Hao^{3} Ching^{4}-sung^{1}
- IPA: [xàʊ tɕîn.sʊ́ŋ] or [xàʊ tɕîŋ.sʊ́ŋ]

Hao Jinsong LL.M. (Chinese: 郝劲松; pinyin: Hǎo Jìnsōng; born in October 1972) is a Chinese law professional (Note: While being referred to as ‘lawyer’ on many occasions, including many of the cited sources in this entry, Hao has explicitly stated many times that he did not acquire the lawyer’s certificate and, therefore, is not a lawyer.) and civil rights activist.

== Early life and work ==
Hao was born in October 1972 in Dingxiang, Xinzhou, Shanxi. Before becoming an activist, Hao had worked in the local bank for eight years. He went to read laws at China University of Political Science and Law and graduated with a master's degree in criminal litigation. He deliberately chose not to acquire a lawyer’s certificate, which he reckoned would hinder his pursuing in administrative lawsuits. Hao then championed the rule of law in China by suing the Chinese authorities on trivial matters, which garnered him accolades even from some media considered as mouthpieces of the Chinese Communist Party, such as the People’s Daily.

In September 2004, Hao sued the Dongcheng District Taxation Bureau for its inaction in dealing with his complaint against the then Beijing Railway Administration’s refusal to issue tax receipts for purchases he made on trains. He then sued the Beijing Railway Administration separately for this matter in less than a month later. He won the lawsuit against the Beijing Railway Administration in June 2005. He then brought up another case against the Beijing Subway for not issuing tax receipts for toilet fees, which he won again. In 2006, he challenged the then Ministry of Railways for deliberately raising ticket prices during the Chunyun period without conducting a public hearing first. He was defeated in that case, but the price hike was scrapped shortly afterwards, and the case received favourable coverage from the China Central Television for his defence of the public interest. These trivial administrative lawsuits made him famous and brought him honours from various Chinese media, praising him for his ‘positive contribution’. Hao was selected as a featured figure in the Procuratorate Daily’s How the Rule of Law Affects Our Lives: The 2005 Bluebook and again in the 2006 edition.

In 2007, Hao sued the National Forestry Administration for its inaction and lack of transparency following the South China Tiger photograph claims, in which the Shanxi Forestry Department promoted fake news and photographs purporting to show the existence of a South China Tiger in the wild. Hao also sued the person who had produced the false pictures, alleging that the person had harmed trust among citizens, harmed the honesty of the government, and harmed the honesty of society. His various pieces of litigation were rejected by the courts. Numerous central government media organizations including CCTV, Xinhua News Agency, and people.com.cn gave positive coverage to Hao's efforts. In addition to positive press coverage, Hao's litigation on the South China Tiger issue was well-received by other activists.

== Detention, arrest, and adjudication ==
Hao was summoned by the local police of his birthplace on 10 and 11 December 2019 for ‘picking quarrels and provoking trouble’ (Chinese: 寻衅滋事; pinyin: Xúnxìn Zīshì). He was once again summoned on 17 December and was penalised with 15 days of administrative detention, citing the Anti-Terrorism Law, for his ‘repeated release of terrorism-involving remarks on the internet’ and ‘refusing to cooperate with public security organ’s preventive efforts on anti-terrorism and security’, which as per the statement from the police, ‘caused serious consequences’.

15 days later, on 2 January 2020, Hao was converted to criminal detention and transferred to Wutai County Detention Centre on suspicion of ‘picking quarrels and provoking trouble’. Under criminal detention, Hao was denied meeting with his lawyer, citing that the case was ‘investigated by a special investigation team’ and required additional authorisation. He was formally arrested on 17 January 2020 upon the approval from the local prosecution with two charges, adding ‘libel’ (Chinese: 诽谤; pinyin: Fěibàng) besides the already accused ‘picking quarrels and provoking trouble’. Four months later, in the middle of May 2020, the investigation authority finished their work with two months of extensions, added another accusation of ‘fraud’ (Chinese: 诈骗; pinyin: Zhàpiàn), and transferred the case to the local prosecution for examination.

On 20 July 2023, after being detained on remand for over 1,300 days, Hao was convicted of ‘picking quarrels and provoking trouble’ and ‘fraud’ by the Dingxiang County People’s Court and was given a concurrent sentence of fixed-term imprisonment for nine years, with a fine of 350,000 Chinese yuan.

In separate terms, the court found him guilty of ‘picking quarrels and provoking trouble’ for his reposts and comments on several social media platforms that deemed ‘containing false information’ and ‘being widely spread over the internet, causing a large number of views, reposts, and comments’, which ‘obscured the facts’; the court found him guilty of ‘fraud’ for the concealment of his non-practising lawyer status in his past two provisions of legal consultancy services in 2013 and 2017. Hao received one year and nine months for the first conviction, with another eight years and a fine of 350,000 yuan for the second, which were combined by the court into nine years and a fine concurrently. The charge for ‘libel’, however, was dropped in the court’s adjudication.

Hao’s judgement was not proclaimed in public, which is an explicit violation of Article 202 of the Criminal Procedure Law, (Note: Article 202 of the Criminal Procedure Law of mainland China explicitly stipulated that ‘In all cases, judgements shall be publicly pronounced.’) nor was it sent to his family or published on the internet, which is noted by some media to be the ‘new normality’ in mainland China.

Hao did not lodge an appeal in court.

== See also ==
- Weiquan lawyers
- Human rights in China
- Picking quarrels and provoking trouble
- List of Chinese dissidents
