= Cheng Hong =

Chinese professor, widow of Li Keqiang

- 程虹
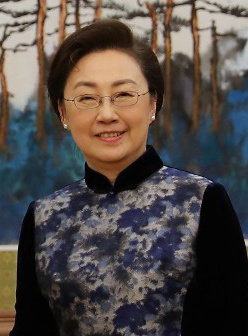
- Cheng in 2019
- Born: 21 November 1957 (age 68); Zhengzhou, Henan, China
- Education: PLA Information Engineering University; Tsinghua University
- Occupations: Literary scholar, translator
- Spouse: Li Keqiang (m. 1983; died 2023)
- Children: 1
- Writing career
- Language: Chinese, English
- Period: 1995–present
- Subject: American natural literature
- Notable work: Return to the Wilderness

Cheng Hong (Chinese: 程虹; pinyin: Chéng Hóng; born 21 November 1957) is a Chinese literary scholar and translator. She is a professor at the Capital University of Economics and Business and the widow of the former Chinese premier Li Keqiang.

== Biography ==
Cheng was born in Zhengzhou, Henan, in 1957. She secondary studied at Zhengzhou No.7 Middle School. During the Cultural Revolution, she became a sent-down youth in Guangkuo Tiandi Township, Jia County, Henan. After the resumption of college entrance examination in 1977, she was accepted to the PLA College of Foreign Languages (now PLA Information Engineering University). After graduation, she engaged in advanced studies at Tsinghua University, where she met her future husband Li Keqiang.

In 1991, Cheng translated the BBC book about the popular British TV series, Yes Minister.

In 1995, Cheng was a visiting scholar in the United States at Brown University. Cheng taught at Beijing Institute of Economics (Capital University of Economics and Business).

Considered one of the leading Chinese scholars of American nature writing, as of 2012 she had published two books on the subject and translated several books from English to Chinese, including The Singing Wilderness by Sigurd Olson, and The Outermost House by Henry Beston.

== Personal life ==
Cheng was married to Li Keqiang until his death in 2023; he served as Premier of the People's Republic of China from 2013 to 2023. They had one daughter who studied in the United States and has since returned to China.

== See also ==
- Peng Liyuan

Honorary titles
Preceded by Zhang Peili	Spouse of the Premier of the People's Republic of China; 2013–2023	Succeeded by Li Qiang's wife (name unknown)
