= Sun Dawu =

Chinese businessman (b. 1954)

- 孙大午
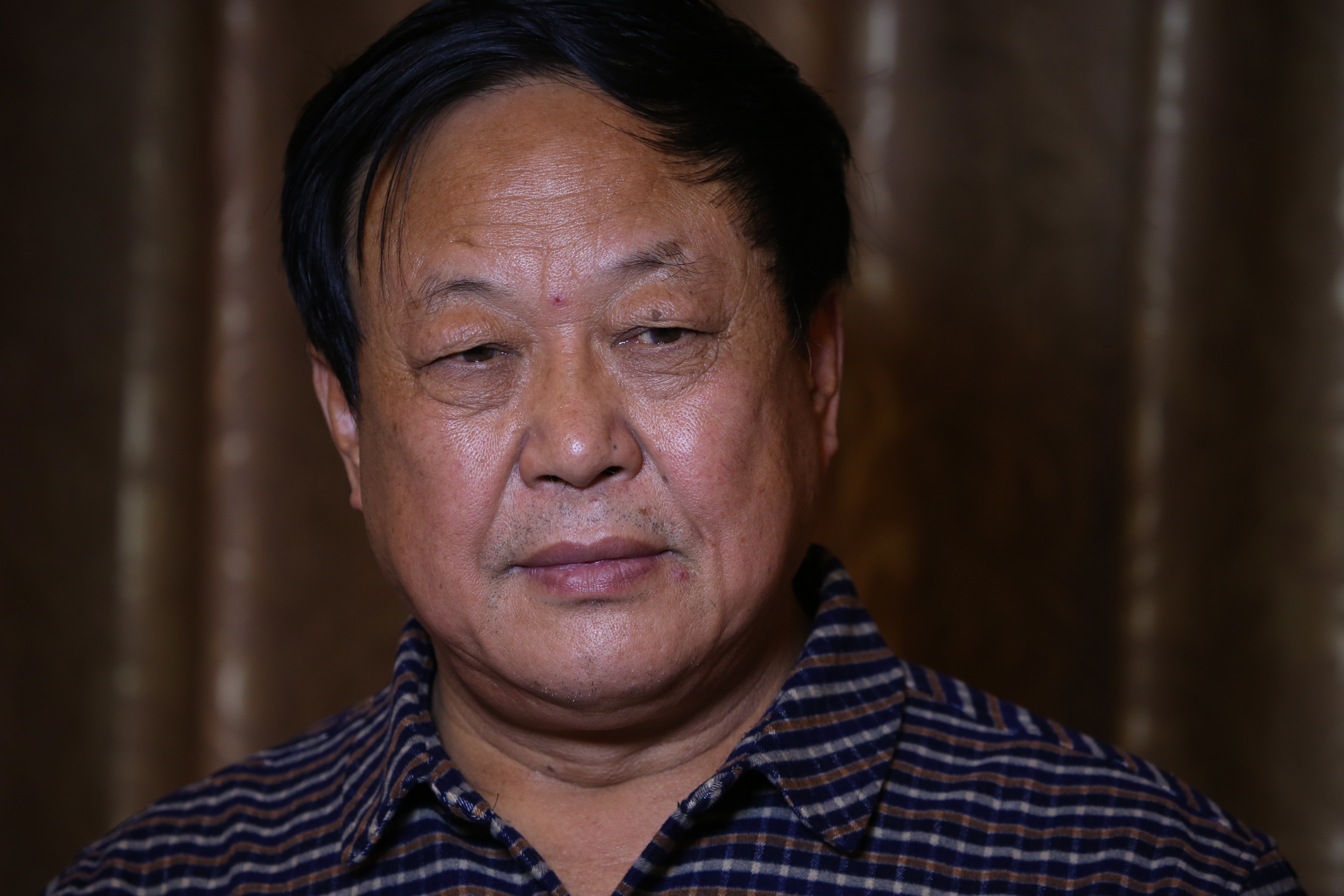
- Born: June 1954 (age 71); Langwuzhuang, Xushui District, Baoding, Hebei Province, China
- Known for: Dawu Group
- Political party: Chinese Communist Party
- Criminal status: Imprisoned

Sun Dawu (Chinese: 孙大午; born June 1954) is a Chinese billionaire. He co-owns the Dawu Agricultural and Animal Husbandry Group with his wife, Liu Huiru (刘会茹). The Dawu Group was originally focused on agriculture and gradually broadened its scope to include animal feed, real estate, education, and healthcare operations. Dawu is recognized as an advocate of farmers' rights and rural land reform. He is known to have hosted human rights lawyers and financed their legal costs when they came under political fire.

Dawu was detained in late November 2020, along with 20 relatives and business associates, over a land dispute with government-run farms. He was later charged with and convicted of picking quarrels and provoking trouble.

== Early life and career ==
After graduating from junior high school, Dawu spent time in Linfen, Shanxi in the 82nd Division of the 28th Group Army of the People's Liberation Army and the Agricultural Bank of Xushui County. In 1985, he founded the Dawu Agriculture and Animal Husbandry Group Co., Ltd., and served as chairman of the board. He began his business with 1,000 chickens and 50 pigs. During his tenure as chairman, Dawu was honored as the No. 1 Chicken-Raising Scholar in Hebei province in June 1996.

In 1995, when the Dawu Group had become one of China's top 500 private companies, Dawu was elected as a Deputy to the Baoding Municipal People's Congress. In August 1996, he was elected as Chairman of the Baoding Poultry and Egg Industry Federation. In 2001, Dawu served as the principal of the Dawu School while remaining chairman of the Dawu Group. In October 2002, he was hired as a senior researcher by the Institute of Farmer Issues of China Agricultural University.

Dawu built a company town in Hebei called Dawu City, which surrounded the campus of the Dawu Group and included amenities such as a hospital with 1,000 beds.

In 2005, Dawu retired from his post as chairman, becoming head of the supervisory board of Dawu Group.

== Criticism of the Chinese government ==
Dawu would often post his views, along with articles by liberals, on his company's website. In April 2003, the Dawu Group posted three articles on its website that were critical of the Chinese Government, including one about Li Shenzhi. The group was subsequently ordered to remove the articles, shut down the website for six months and pay a fine of 15,000 yuan.

Dawu has also praised and supported several Chinese dissidents, including human rights lawyer Xu Zhiyong. Liu Xiaobo stated that Sun posed a “tremendous challenge for the current system” of the Chinese government. Dawu advocated political reform and publicly opposed many government policies, even questioning the legitimacy of the Chinese Communist Party.

Dawu also voiced his support for those caught up in the 709 crackdown; a nationwide crackdown on Chinese lawyers and human rights activists during the summer of 2015. Moreover, he accused the government of covering up an African swine flu outbreak in China, which adversely affected his farms and devastated much of the country's industry in 2019.

== Legal issues ==
In May 2003, Dawu was arrested after raising 180 million yuan, even though he was able to prove he was just borrowing the funds. The case received unprecedented attention, with academics such as Mao Yushi, lawyers such as Xu Zhiyong, reporters and even local farmers rallying on Dawu's behalf. President Hu Jintao and Vice-Premier Hui Liangyu reportedly ordered local officials to "handle the case with care." The local court sentenced him to three years imprisonment and four years of probation with a fine of 100,000 yuan for illegally using public funds. However, the sentence was later suspended for four years, and he was set free after the trial. The Dawu Group was also fined 300,000 yuan. According to journalists and academics across China, Dawu had a "notorious" reputation among local officials as a result of his refusal to pay bribes. After the case, Dawu was ordered to maintain a low profile.

=== 2020 arrest and imprisonment ===
In November 2020, Dawu was arrested, following a dispute between his firm and a state farm in Hebei province, without an official explanation. He was later charged with picking quarrels and provoking trouble, illegal fundraising, illegal mining, encroaching on state farmland and obstructing public service. Members of his family, including his wife, sons and daughters-in-law were also detained along with company executives.

In a pre-trial hearing, Dawu reportedly denied many of the accusations against him, describing himself as an "outstanding Communist party member". He however admitting to having made mistakes, including posting messages online. Dawu's legal team wrote a letter requesting that the case be heard in open court.

In a closed-door trial, Dawu pled not guilty to nine charges and was said to have gone on a hunger strike to protest his treatment. Sun's legal team informed the court that prosecution extorted information through "torture," and that Dawu was subjected to "cruel and inhuman treatment," resulting in forced and false confessions. The court rejected the request of Dawu's legal team to rule the information invalid.

In July 2021, Dawu was sentenced to 18 years in prison, having been found guilty of picking quarrels and provoking trouble. Other charges levied against him included illegally occupying farmland, assembling a crowd to attack state agencies and obstructing government workers from performing their duties. He was also fined 3.11 million yuan ($478,697).

In a closing statement to the court, Dawu asked that all criticism be directed to him alone and pleaded for other defendants to be acquitted.

== See also ==
- Duan Weihong
- Ren Zhiqiang
- Jack Ma
