= Lin Shengliang =

Chinese human rights activist and dissident

- 林生亮
- Born: October 23, 1978 (age 47); Guangdong, China
- Occupations: Human rights defender, dissident
- Known for: Launching the "List of CCP Perpetrators"

Lin Shengliang (born 23 October 1978), also known as James Lin Shengliang, is a Chinese human rights activist and dissident from Dabu County, Guangdong. He previously worked in corporate finance. He was twice sentenced to imprisonment for the offence of "picking quarrels and provoking trouble" and later went into exile in the Netherlands. His record number in the database of the Congressional-Executive Commission on China is 2018-00008.

Lin became known for launching the "List of CCP Perpetrators", later also known as the "China Human Rights Accountability Database", a project that collects and publishes information on mainland Chinese public officials and related individuals whom it considers to have been involved in human rights abuses.

== Biography ==
Lin Shengliang was born on 23 October 1978 in Dabu County, Meizhou, Guangdong, and later moved to Shenzhen, Guangdong. In his early years, he was exposed to political issues such as democracy and freedom through his family experiences and information relating to the 1989 Tiananmen Square protests. Beginning in 2004, he took part in civil rights activities, including online advocacy, anti-corruption campaigns on Weibo, same-city gatherings, and campaigns in support of arrested rights defenders. After the arrest of rights activists in Shenzhen in 2016, he assisted the families of detainees in seeking outside attention, and followed public incidents such as the Ming Jingguo anti-demolition case in Ganzhou, Jiangxi, and the death of student Zhao Xin at Taifu Middle School in Luxian County, Sichuan.

In May 2017, Lin was criminally detained by Shenzhen police on suspicion of "picking quarrels and provoking trouble" after he disseminated slogans such as "Go on Twitter, follow Guo Wengui" on shared bicycles, public facilities, and online platforms in several locations in Shenzhen. He was later formally arrested. On 14 November of the same year, the People's Court of Bao'an District, Shenzhen, sentenced him to one year and two months in prison for "picking quarrels and provoking trouble". In July 2018, he was released after serving his sentence. According to reports, after his release he was taken by police to another location for "red education".

In August 2018, Lin was again taken away by Shenzhen police and detained at the Bao'an District Detention Center. The case was related to his online criticism of the Chinese Communist Party authorities and his plan to publish the "List of CCP Perpetrators". In April 2019, the case was heard at the Bao'an District Court in Shenzhen; in August of the same year, he was again sentenced to two years in prison for "picking quarrels and provoking trouble", and was released in August 2020 after serving his sentence. Rights groups and media reports said that Lin was subjected to torture and mistreatment during detention and imprisonment, including prolonged handcuffing, restrictions on correspondence, bans on reading and writing, surveillance, and corporal punishment. Lin himself also sent appeals for help to the outside world, accusing detention center and prison personnel of violating his basic rights.

After his release from prison in 2020, Lin continued to participate in rights-defense activities. In November 2020, he followed the Danke Apartment collapse incident, assisted affected tenants in defending their rights, and demanded that relevant authorities and financial institutions assume responsibility. On 10 December 2020, Human Rights Day, while consulting the Futian District People's Court in Shenzhen about the seizure and auction of property under his name, he was detained for several hours. In February 2021, after posting an image containing a watermark related to Hong Kong events and comments about the Spring Festival Gala on his WeChat Moments, he was placed under administrative detention for fifteen days and fined by Shenzhen police on the grounds of "picking quarrels and provoking trouble". Lin later applied for administrative reconsideration, arguing that posting the image fell within freedom of speech and that the administrative punishment lacked a legal basis.

In August 2021, Lin and his eldest daughter left mainland China and arrived in the Netherlands while transiting through Amsterdam Airport Schiphol, later residing there. After going into exile, he continued his China human rights advocacy and used social media platforms to follow the situation of mainland Chinese political prisoners, lawyers, and rights activists. He also participated in online initiatives such as "One Person, One Tweet" and the "Tear Down the Wall Movement". His best-known activity was launching the "List of CCP Perpetrators". According to media reports, he proposed the idea around 2021 and, from the end of 2022, worked with volunteers to update the list regularly through channels including X. The project collects the names, photographs, positions, workplaces, reasons for inclusion, and other information of people it considers to have used public power to violate human rights. Lin has stated that the purpose of the project is to record perpetrators, raise the cost of committing abuses, and provide information for future accountability mechanisms such as the Global Magnitsky Human Rights Accountability Act. By May 2024, reports said that the list had publicly named several hundred people.

Lin's family has also drawn attention. His eldest daughter moved overseas with him, while his second daughter and son remained in China. In July 2023, another underage daughter of Lin in mainland China, accompanied by relatives, attempted to travel to Hong Kong but was subjected to border control, searches, and questioning at a Shenzhen border checkpoint, and was told that she was barred from leaving the country on suspicion of endangering national security. Lin said that at the same time his mother was also summoned for questioning by police, who mentioned his critical remarks made overseas. Lin regarded the incident as an attempt to pressure the family members of a dissident.
