= 25th anniversary of the 1989 Tiananmen Square protests and massacre =

2014 Chinese commemoration

25th anniversary of Tiananmen Square protests of 1989
- Date: 4 June 2014
- Location: Hong Kong
- Participants: general public
- Outcome: protests, Candlelight vigil

The 25th anniversary of Tiananmen Square protests of 1989 was principally events that occurred in China and elsewhere on and leading up to 4 June 2014—to commemorate the Chinese Communist Party's crackdown on the Tiananmen Square protests of 1989.

On 2 June, at least 1,900 participants attended a protest in Hong Kong to remember the 1989 student protest movement and to demand an end to one-party rule in China.

== Detainees ==
In the run-up to the anniversary, the authorities in the People's Republic of China detained and silenced dissidents as in previous years. Targets included lawyers, human rights activists, and journalists, among others. Amnesty International estimates a total of 58 individuals: 18 criminally detained, 20 placed under house arrest, 10 missing and believed to be detained, and 10 forced by police to travel to different cities in China. One prominent dissident included human rights lawyer and free speech advocate Pu Zhiqiang, detained on the charge of "causing a disturbance" after attending a meeting urging a probe of the 1989 crackdown.

== Censorship ==
Google and its affiliated services were blocked in mainland China on 2 June.

== Official response in China ==
China defended the 1989 crackdown on 3 June. In a daily news briefing, foreign ministry spokesperson Hong Lei announced that "The Chinese government long ago reached a conclusion about the political turmoil at the end of the 1980s... In the last three decades and more of reform and opening up, China's enormous achievements in social and economic development have received worldwide attention. The building of democracy and the rule of law have continued to be perfected... It can be said that the road to socialism with Chinese characteristics which we follow today accords with China's national condition and the basic interests of the vast majority of China's people, which is the aspiration of all China's people." Hong also claimed that "In China there are only law breakers – there are no so-called dissidents."

== See also ==
- Memorials for the Tiananmen Square protests of 1989
- Internet censorship in the People's Republic of China
- Human rights in China
