= Zhao Lianhai =

Chinese dissident

- Born: 21 May 1972 (age 54); Beijing, People's Republic of China
- Criminal charge: inciting social disorder
- Criminal penalty: 2 1/2 years in prison
- Spouse: Li Xuemei
- Children: Zhao Pengrui; Zhao Sian

Zhao Lianhai (赵连海) is a Chinese dissident and former food safety worker who became an activist for parents of children harmed during the 2008 Chinese milk scandal. In 2010 he was sentenced to 2 1/2 years imprisonment for 'disturbing social order'.

Zhao was born circa 1972. He used to work for the Food Quality and Safety Authority of China. His son, Pengrui, was born in late 2005 and became ill as a result of drinking tainted milk.

== Activism and website ==
Zhao became a leader in the movement of parents to get restitution and treatment for their children. He called for a national memorial day for the victims. He held a memorial ceremony in his home for parents of harmed children.

He started the "Home for Kidney Stone Babies" (结石宝宝之家, jieshibaobao.com) website from his apartment in Daxing, near Beijing. The website was blocked in China. The site was also shut down by the government so he moved hosting to Japan.

Parents of children harmed by melamine-tainted milk went to the website and could exchange information about how to sue. Zhao also pushed for increased research into the number of kidney stone babies.

The site published a leaked document from the Henan Department of Health, which had allegedly ordered workers to underreport kidney stone cases.

The website also posted claims that autopsies of children were being denied.

In 2009, Zhao posted a petition arguing against accepting the government's compensation plan as inadequate (especially considering the long-term unknowns), and not created in consultation with parents. The petition was signed by several hundred parents.

The police and/or public security bureau harassed him, his wife, his mother, his siblings, and volunteer students. The government also broke up meetings and a press conference.

== Arrest, trial, imprisonment ==
Zhao was taken by police in mid-November 2009. Arrest papers were given to his wife Li Xuemei on 21 December 2009, on charges, she said, of "picking quarrels and provoking trouble". His case was handed to prosecutors in early 2010. He was tried at Daxing district court in Beijing where he was legally represented by Li Fangping and Peng Jian.

A lawyer's blog claimed the police wrote the following:

From September 2008 to September 2009, Zhao Lianhai used 'protecting rights' as well as the Sanlu milk powder issue as an excuse to hype and agitate people who did not know the truth to disturb social order ... by shouting slogans and gathering illegally.

He was sentenced on 10 November 2010 to 2 1/2 years prison. The main charge was inciting social disorder.

Three incidents were used against Zhao at his trial:

- Organizing a gathering of 12 parents
- Holding a sign in front of a factory and court
- Giving media interviews in a public place

Amnesty International condemned the sentence and he began a hunger strike in protest. Li Xuemei, his wife, indicated there would be an appeal.

Leung Man-tao, a Hong Kong based writer, wrote an op-ed in Southern Weekend in Guangzhou, defending Zhao. He was named as a political prisoner by the Congressional-Executive Commission on China, and as a prisoner of conscience by Amnesty International.

Zhao was subsequently released on medical parole, which normally allows freedom of movement, subject to regular reports to the local police. But Zhao has largely been restricted to his Daxing home and official harassment has continued, such as when he tried to take his children for a day out on 31 May 2011, and the family were surrounded by police and public security officials and held in a nearby restaurant in what onlookers thought was a hostage situation.

== Censorship ==
Reports and discussions on Chinese websites are restricted. On 30 March 2010, Hong Kong singer Gigi Leung posted about the unjustly jailed Zhao Lianhai on Sina Weibo. After receiving a message from website's administrator, Gigi Leung then deleted the relevant blog, resulted in hundreds of supportive messages from her fans.

== 2010 Hong Kong journalists assaulted ==
On 10 December 2010 several Hong Kong journalists were at Zhao's apartment in Daxing, Beijing to interview his supporters. About 40 members of a "Neighbourhood Management Committee" tried to stop the journalists. The journalists were kicked, struck and had their cameras blocked. An ATV journalist's camera was hit. A female RTHK reporter was slapped. The Hong Kong Journalists Association expressed concern about the incident. Hong Kong director of broadcasting Franklin Wong Wah-kay (黃華麒), head of the public broadcaster RTHK, condemned the attack and said the journalists were legally covering the case under mainland law.

On 29 December 2010 the director of the Hong Kong and Macau office of the State Council Wang Guangya said that under the one country, two systems principle Hong Kong should not interfere. He then made a controversial statement that "well water should not mix with river water (do not interfere with each other)".

== See also ==
- List of Chinese dissidents
- Chinese legal system
- Whistleblowers
- Tan Zuoren
- Xu Zhiyong
- Golden Shield Project
