= Wen Yunsong =

Chinese businessman

Wen Yunsong, also known as Winston Wen (simplified Chinese: 温云松; traditional Chinese: 溫雲松; pinyin: Wēn Yúnsōng) is a Chinese businessman and current CEO of Unihub Global Networks, a Chinese networking company. He is the son of former Chinese Premier Wen Jiabao and thus a princeling. Mr. Wen was a principal of New Horizon Capital, a private equity fund. He received his MBA from the Kellogg School of Management.
