= Wen Jiabao =

Premier of China from 2003 to 2013

- 温家宝
- Wen in 2012

Premier of China
- In office 16 March 2003 – 14 March 2013
- President: Hu Jintao
- Vice Premier: Cabinet I (2003–08): Huang Ju Wu Yi Zeng Peiyan Hui Liangyu; Cabinet II (2008–13): Li Keqiang Hui Liangyu Zhang Dejiang Wang Qishan
- Preceded by: Zhu Rongji
- Succeeded by: Li Keqiang

Vice Premier of China
- In office 18 March 1998 – 14 March 2003 Serving with Li Lanqing, Qian Qichen, Wu Bangguo
- Premier: Zhu Rongji
- Preceded by: Li Lanqing
- Succeeded by: Hui Liangyu

Director of the General Office of the Chinese Communist Party
- In office April 1986 – March 1993
- General Secretary: Hu Yaobang; Zhao Ziyang; Jiang Zemin
- Preceded by: Wang Zhaoguo
- Succeeded by: Zeng Qinghong

Personal details
- Born: 15 September 1942 (age 84) Tiensin, Republic of China (present day Tianjin, China)
- Party: CCP (Since 1965)
- Spouse: Zhang Peili
- Children: 2
- Education: China University of Geosciences (BS, MS)
- Wen Jiabao's voice Wen speaking to the press before a bilateral meeting with US president Barack Obama in Phnom Penh, Cambodia; Recorded 20 November 2012

Chinese name
- Simplified Chinese: 温家宝
- Traditional Chinese: 溫家寶
Transcriptions
Standard Mandarin
- Hanyu Pinyin: Wēn Jiābǎo
- Wade–Giles: Wen^{1} Chia^{1}-pao^{3}
- IPA: [wə́n tɕjá.pàʊ]
other Mandarin
- Xiao'erjing: وينْ جْيَاباوْ
Yue: Cantonese
- Yale Romanization: Wān Gāa-bóu
- Jyutping: Wan1 Gaa1-bou2
- IPA: [wɐn˥ ka˥.pɔw˧˥]
Southern Min
- Hokkien POJ: Un Ka-pó

Wen Jiabao (Chinese: 温家宝; pinyin: Wēn Jiābǎo; born 15 September 1942) is a retired Chinese politician and geologist who served as the Premier of China from 2003 to 2013 and the third-ranking member of the Politburo Standing Committee of the Chinese Communist Party from 2002 to 2012.

Born in Tianjin, Wen joined the Chinese Communist Party in 1965. After graduating from university, he began his career at Gansu Geological Bureau. He rose through the ranks and in 1983 became the Vice Minister of Geology and Mineral Resources. In 1985, he was promoted to the Politburo by CCP General Secretary Hu Yaobang. Wen worked as the Director of the General Office of the Chinese Communist Party between 1986 and 1993, and accompanied Zhao Ziyang to Tiananmen Square during the 1989 protests as his secretary. In 1998, Wen was promoted to the post of Vice Premier under his mentor Zhu Rongji. As Vice Premier, he oversaw agricultural, financial and environmental policies.

In November 2002, Wen jointed the Politburo Standing Committee, becoming its third-ranking member behind CCP General Secretary Hu Jintao and National People's Congress Standing Committee Chairman Wu Bangguo. Appointed as Premier in March 2003, he sought to shift China’s economic priorities away from coastal, export-driven growth and toward reducing the burdens on farmers and migrant workers through measures such as abolishing agricultural taxes and increasing infrastructure spending. Regarded as a leading figure in the Party’s reformist wing, he expressed support for political reform. However, a 2012 New York Times exposé of his family wealth cast a shadow over his legacy. He left office in 2013 and was succeeded by Li Keqiang.

== Early life and education ==
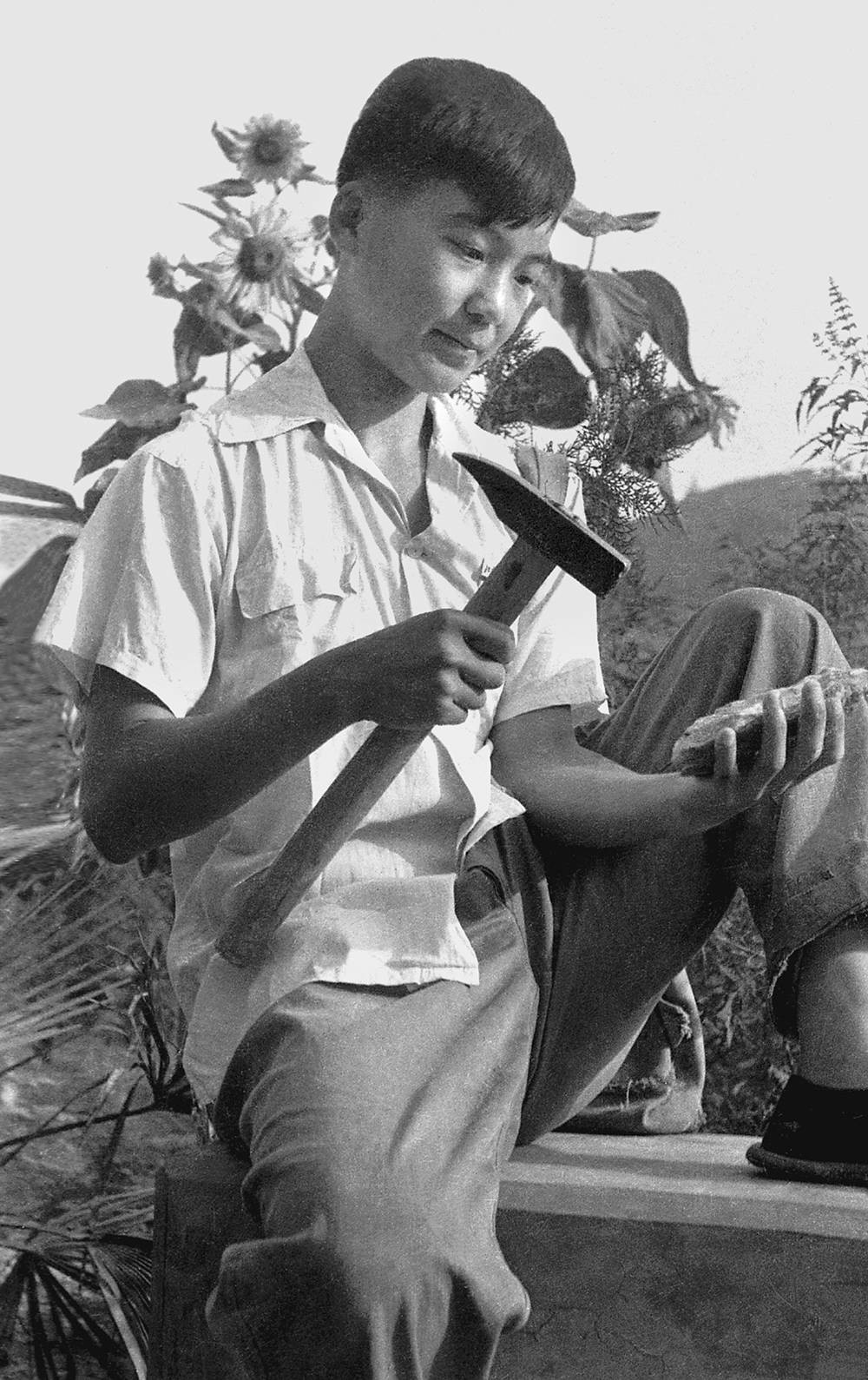
Wen at the China University of Geosciences in 1960

Born in Beichen district of the City of Tianjin, Wen went to the Nankai High School from which the first premier of the People's Republic of China Zhou Enlai graduated.

Wen attended the Beijing Institute of Geology (now the China University of Geosciences) for undergraduate education with a major in geological surveying and prospecting from 1960 to 1965. Afterwards, he pursued his graduate studies in geological structure from 1965 to 1968.

Wen joined the Chinese Communist Party when he was a college student in April 1965. His granduncle worked as a diplomat at the Ministry of Foreign Affairs.

== Early career ==
After the completion of his graduate studies, he began his career in the geology bureau of Gansu province. From 1968 to 1978, he presided over the Geomechanics Survey Team under the Gansu Provincial Geological Bureau and head of its political section. Wen succeeded in office, rising as chief of the Gansu Provincial Geological Bureau and later as Vice Minister of Geology and Mineral Resources.

Wen was "discovered" by then-CCP general secretary Hu Yaobang in 1985, and joined the ranks of the Central Committee and Politburo. There was some public speculation after 1989 over whether Wen was closer to Hu Yaobang or Zhao Ziyang, but Wen implicitly confirmed that he was a protégé of Hu by the release of his 2010 article, "Recalling Hu Yaobang when I returned to Xingyi". After Wen was promoted to work in Beijing, he served as Chief of the Party's General Affairs Office, an organ that oversaw day-to-day operations of the party's leaders. He remained in the post for eight years.

Wen built a network of patronage during his career. Throughout this period Wen was said to be a strong administrator and technocrat, having earned a reputation for meticulousness, competence, and a focus on tangible results. Wen became an alternate member of the Politburo after 14th Party Congress in October 1992. In March 1993, Wen was transferred to Central Rural Work Leading Group as deputy director, where he became a deputy of Zhu Rongji. During this time, Wen became a close ally of Zhu, and Wen successfully became the member of Politburo in September 1997 after the 15th Party Congress. Premier Zhu Rongji showed his esteem for Wen by entrusting him from 1998 with the task of overseeing agricultural, financial and environmental policies in the office of Vice Premier, considered crucial as China prepared to enter the World Trade Organization. Wen served as Secretary of the Central Financial Work Commission from 1998 to 2002. By the end of the 1990s Wen and Zhang Peili were the main investor and founder of Ping An Insurance, which was established with the help of Hong Kong tycoon Cheng Yu-tung's family through real estate firm New World Development.

=== Survival of Tiananmen purge ===
Wen's most significant political recovery occurred after accompanying Zhao on his visit to students demonstrating in Tiananmen Square in 1989. Unlike Zhao, who was purged from the party days later for "grave insubordination" and lived under house arrest in Beijing until his death in January 2005, Wen survived the political aftermath of the demonstrations. Wen is the only Chief of the Party's General Affairs Office to have served under three General Secretaries: Hu Yaobang, Zhao Ziyang, and Jiang Zemin.

== First-term premiership ==
Wen entered the Politburo Standing Committee of the Chinese Communist Party, China's highest ruling council, after 16th Party Congress in November 2002, ranked third out of nine members (After Hu Jintao and Wu Bangguo). During the transition of authority as Hu Jintao assumed the general secretary and presidency in November 2002 and March 2003 respectively, Wen's nomination as premier was confirmed by the National People's Congress with over 99% of the delegates' vote.

After taking over as Premier, Wen oversaw the continuation of the reform and opening up and has been involved in shifting national goals from economic growth at all costs to growth which also emphasizes more egalitarian wealth, along with other social goals, such as public health and education. Wen's broad range of experience and expertise, especially cultivated while presiding over agricultural policies under Zhu Rongji, has been important as the "fourth generation" sought to revitalize the rural economy in regions left out by the past two decades of reform. In addition, the Chinese government under Wen has begun to focus on the social costs of economic development, which include damage to the environment and to workers' health. This more comprehensive definition of development was encapsulated into the idea of a xiaokang society. In November 2003, Wen and his government introduced the slogan of "Five Comprehensive Coordinations" which outlined the Communist Party's priorities for harmonious and scientific development: mitigating urban-rural imbalances, interregional imbalances, socio-economic imbalances, human-environmental imbalances, and domestic-international imbalances. Chinese economy remained high growth rate throughout Wen's first term as Premier, which China has an average GDP growth rate of 11% between 2003 and 2008.

While regarded as quiet and unassuming, Wen is said to be a good communicator and is known as a "man of the people." Wen has reached out to those left out of two decades of economic growth in rural and especially western China. Unlike Jiang Zemin and his protégés on the Politburo Standing Committee, who form the so-called "Shanghai clique", both Wen and Hu hail from, and have cultivated their political bases, in the vast Chinese interior. Many have noted the contrasts between Wen and Hu, "men of the people", and Jiang Zemin, the flamboyant, multilingual, and urbane former mayor of Shanghai, the country's most cosmopolitan city.

Like Hu Jintao, whose purported brilliance and photographic memory have facilitated his meteoric rise to power, Wen is regarded as well-equipped to preside over a vast bureaucracy in the world's most populated and perhaps most rapidly changing nation. In March 2003, the usually self-effacing Wen was quoted as saying, "The former Swiss ambassador to China once said that my brain is like a computer", he said. "Indeed, many statistics are stored in my brain."

Considered by some to be mild-tempered and conciliatory, in comparison to his predecessor, Zhu Rongji, Wen's consensual management style enabled him to generate good will, while also creating some opponents in support of tougher policy decisions. Notably, Wen clashed with then-Shanghai party chief Chen Liangyu over the central government's policies.

Wen was involved in two major episodes involving public health. In early 2003, he was involved in ending the official inaction over the SARS crisis. On 1 December 2004, he became the first major Chinese official to publicly address the problem of AIDS, which has devastated parts of Yunnan and Henan and threatens to be a major burden on Chinese development. Since May 2004, Wen made various visits to communities devastated by AIDS, trips shown prominently on national media. By showing these actions, Wen displayed an effort to reverse years of what many activists have described as a policy of denial and inaction. Furthermore, Wen is concerned about the health and safety of previous drug addicts; since March 2004, Wen had visited several drug addict treatment facilities in southern China and addressed the issue to the patients in person, recognizing that AIDS is more likely to be spread by drug abuse and the reuse of hypodermic syringes than by sexual contact.

Wen was known to conduct visits to relatively poor areas of China's countryside randomly to avoid elaborate preparations to appease officials and hide the real situation, which is done often in China. At committee meetings of the State Council, Wen made it clear that the rural wealth disparity problem must be addressed. Along with general secretary Hu Jintao, the government focused on the "Three Rural Issues", namely, agriculture, the countryside, and farmers, and emphasized these core areas as requiring further work and development. The Hu-Wen administration abolished the thousand year old agricultural tax entirely in 2005, a bold move that significantly changed the rural economic model. But despite these initiatives, Wen has been criticized for allowing the urban-rural gap to actually increase during his tenure.

Like Zhu Rongji, Wen is generally seen as a popular communist official with the Chinese public. His attitude is seemingly sincere and warm, triggering comparisons with former premier Zhou Enlai. Wen spent Chinese New Year in 2005 with a group of coal miners in a Shanxi coal mine. To many, Wen has gained the image of being the "people's premier", a populist, and an ordinary Chinese citizen who knows and understands ordinary people's needs. In an annual meeting of the Chinese Authors Association, Wen spoke for over two hours to the delegates without looking at script. To foreign media, Wen was also the highest figure in the Chinese government to give free press conferences, often facing politically sensitive and difficult questions regarding subjects such as Taiwan Independence, Tibetan independence and human rights.

In December 2003, Wen visited the United States for the first time. During the trip, Wen was able to get President George W. Bush to issue what many saw as a mild rebuke to the then President of the Republic of China (Taiwan), Chen Shui-bian. Wen has also been on visits to Canada and Australia, mostly on economic issues. Wen also visited Japan in April 2007 in what was termed the "de-thawing journey", where he characterized the relationship between the Asian powers as for "mutual benefit". He also met with Emperor Akihito and played baseball.

Balancing regional development was a top priority early in Wen's Premiership. During his delivery of the Annual Work Report of the State Council in March 2004, Wen introduced The Rise of the Central Regions campaign. This campaign included Hubei, Jiangxi, Henan, Hunan, Anhui, and Shanxi. Through it, the central government sought to further advance the already-occurring process of industrial transfer from coastal regions to the interior.

On 15 March 2005, after the anti-secession law was passed, by a majority of 2,896 to nil, with two abstentions by the National People's Congress, Wen said: "We don't wish for foreign intervention, but we are not afraid of it." as an allusion to the United States' stance on Taiwan. That earned him a long round of applause that was rare even by Chinese standards.

On 5 March 2007, Wen announced plans to increase the military budget. By the end of 2007 the military budget rose 17.8 percent from the previous year's 45 billion dollars, creating tension with the United States.

After the conclusion of the 2007 National People's Congress, Wen criticized the state of the economy in comments later described as the "Four Uns." Wen stated that after thirty years of rapid economic growth, the economy was at risk of becoming unstable, unbalanced, uncoordinated, and unsustainable. His comments about the risk of an unsustainable economy alluded to overconsumption of resources, particularly coal, as well as growing income and wealth disparities. Wen's critique of the "Four Uns" prompted significant internal debate over China's growth strategy.

There were rumors about Wen's retirement and reputed clashes with former Shanghai party chief Chen Liangyu before the party's 17th Party Congress. Some sources suggested that Wen would ask to retire due to fatigue. Ultimately, Wen stayed on the Premier job, and was responsible for the drafting of the important speech delivered by Party general secretary Hu Jintao outlining China's direction in the next five years. Chen Liangyu, however, was being removed and arrested in September 2006 due to corruption charge and being sentenced to 18 years in prison in April 2008.

In January 2008, while during the midst of severe snowstorms, Premier Wen made his way south and visited train stations in Changsha and Guangzhou, addressing the public while calming their mood for long train delays.

== Second-term premiership ==
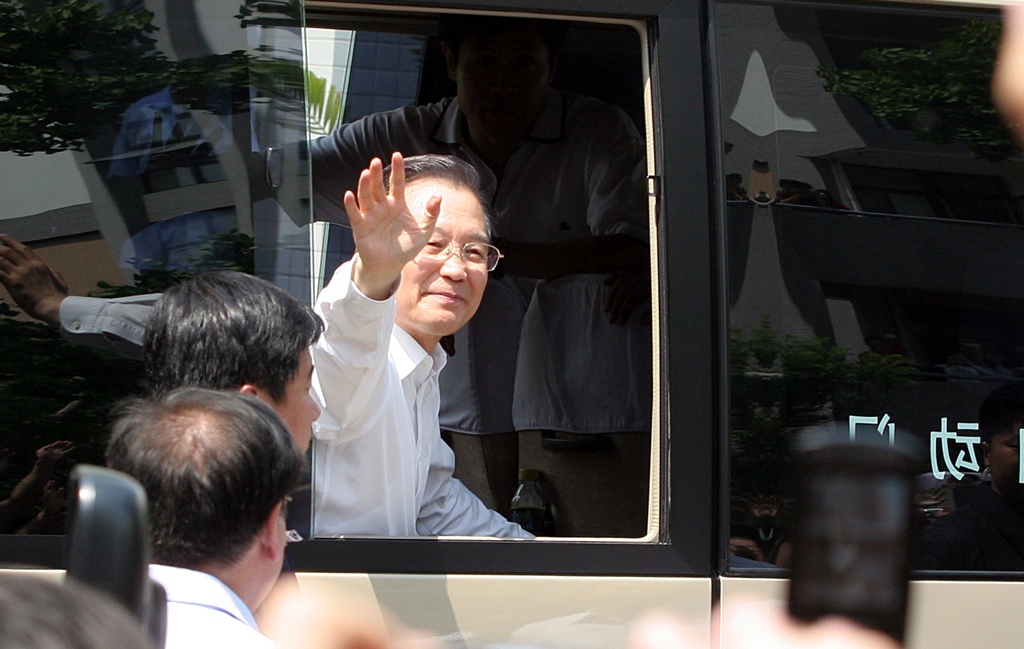
Wen visiting Tsinghua University in May 2009

Wen was appointed to a second five-year term as premier on 16 March 2008, leading efforts to cool soaring inflation and showcase the country to the world at the 2008 Summer Olympics. He received fewer votes in favor than he did in 2003, a sign that the premiership can create enemies, even in the mere formalities of China's electoral system. Wen faced grave economic challenges as the world became increasingly affected by the U.S. economic crisis. Social stability and regional activism in China's restive hinterland regions also dominated Wen's policy agenda. On 18 March 2008, during the press conference after the 2008 National People's Congress, Wen toed the government line in blaming supporters of the Dalai Lama for violence in Tibet, and said Chinese security forces exercised restraint in confronting rioting and unrest in the streets of Lhasa. Wen acted as the spokesman of the Chinese government during the 2008 unrest in Tibet and refused to negotiate with the Dalai Lama and his followers, unless they chose to "give up all separatist activities." On 12 November 2010, during the 2010 Asian Games opening ceremony in Guangzhou, Wen became the first non-head of state to open the Asian Games.

In the 2011 Two Sessions Work Report, Wen stated his support for e-commerce in China, describing it as a mechanism to expand domestic consumption.

In his final address as China's prime minister Wen warned of the nation's growing divisions between rich and poor, the hazards of unchecked environmental degradation and the risks posed by unbalanced economic growth.

=== Response to 2008 Sichuan earthquake ===
Premier Wen's popularity was boosted significantly when he went to the disaster area of the Sichuan a mere few hours after the disaster occurred. He declared on national television that survivors are to be rescued as long as there is "a glimmer of hope". He was named the General Commander of the Earthquake Relief Efforts Committee immediately following the disaster. Following his visits to the area, images of the Premier were displayed on national media, numerous videos popped up on Chinese video sites making comparisons with former Premier Zhou Enlai, a largely popular figure who was also dubbed the "People's Premier". While party leaders are often shown on state television looking rather stiff and sitting motionlessly, Wen's on-site image and candid nature attracted a large popular following of Chinese citizens.

In addition, there was speculation on internet forums as well as foreign media about the availability of the scientific prediction of the 2008 earthquake, and Wen was quoted as the only high-ranking Chinese leader to try to announce the scientific prediction and made it public, but was somehow prevented by other members of the Politburo Standing Committee.

=== 2009 NPC ===
Before the 2009 National People's Congress convened, on 28 February, Premier Wen went online on video chat to answer queries hosted by China's official government website gov.cn and the official Xinhua News Agency. During the session Wen openly advocated for transparency of the government and remarked that he was somewhat nervous about the occasion. He received a wide range of questions from large numbers of online Chinese netizens and chose to answer selected questions about prominent economic issues, such as global financial breakdown.

At the Congress, Wen also passed on a message of reassurance that GDP growth would not dip below 8% in 2009. He did not introduce a new stimulus package, and played down speculation that part of the 1.18 trillion RMB central government spending was not going directly into the economy. He also expressed concern about the security of Beijing's holdings in U.S. treasury debt. In a more unusual gesture, Wen also expressed interest in visiting Taiwan, stating he would "crawl there if [he] could not walk".

=== Foreign policy ===
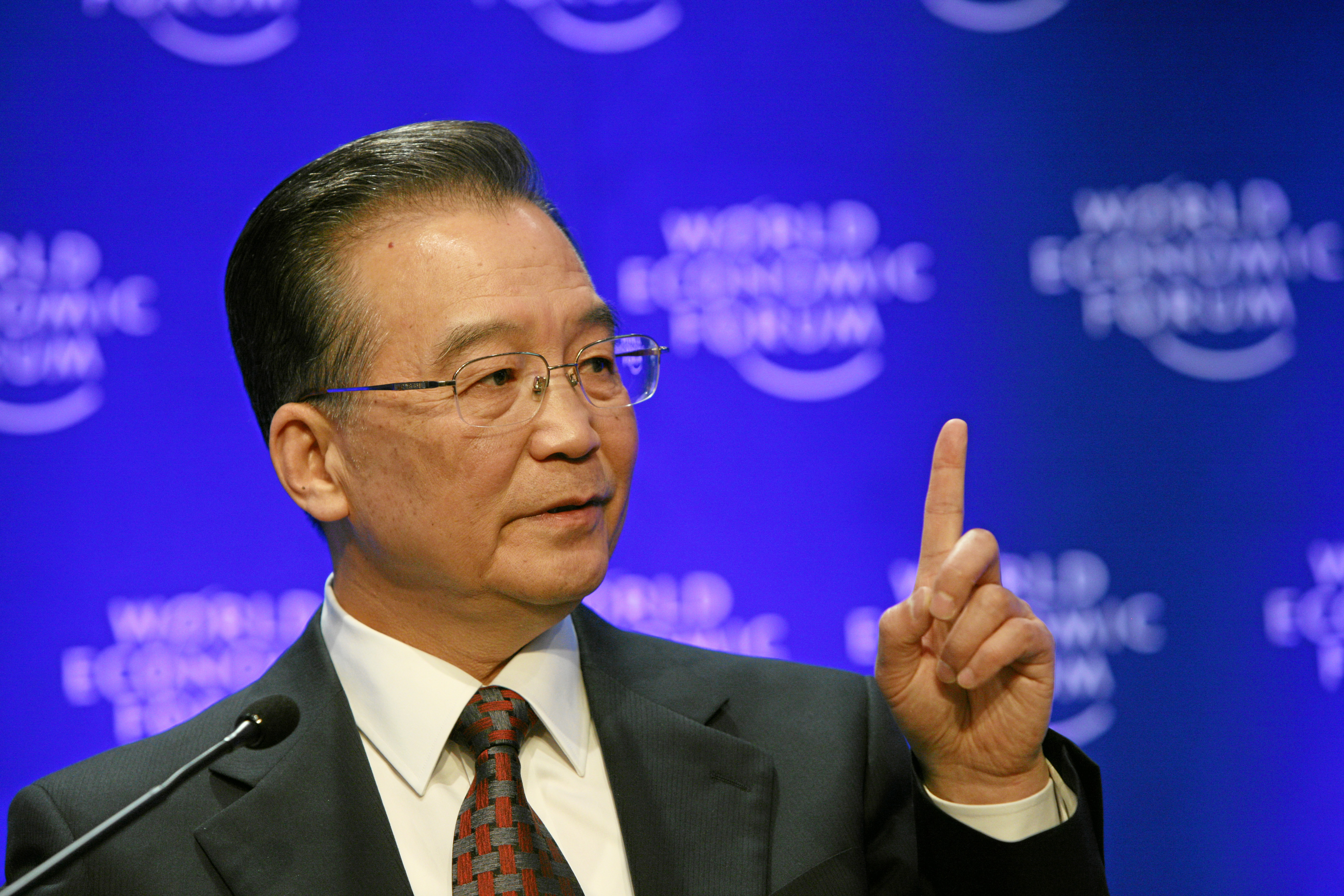
Wen at the 2009 World Economic Forum in Davos

Wen played a prominent role advancing China's foreign policy positions, and became increasingly visible on the world stage as China's economic power expanded. He went on an official working visit to North Korea on 4 October 2009, the first time a Chinese Premier has visited North Korea since Li Peng's visit in 1991. He was greeted at the Pyongyang Airport by ailing North Korean leader Kim Jong-Il. Kim rarely greeted foreign dignitaries himself upon their arrival at the airport. Reuters believed this to be a show of solidarity from North Korea and that the country was serious in fostering a good relationship with China. Wen also met with European Union leaders at a China-EU conference in late November 2009, where he refused calls for China to revalue its Yuan and re-examine its foreign exchange regime. Wen remarked in Nanjing that "some countries are on the one hand pressuring China to appreciate its currency while on the other hand they are practicing trade protectionism against China in many different forms."

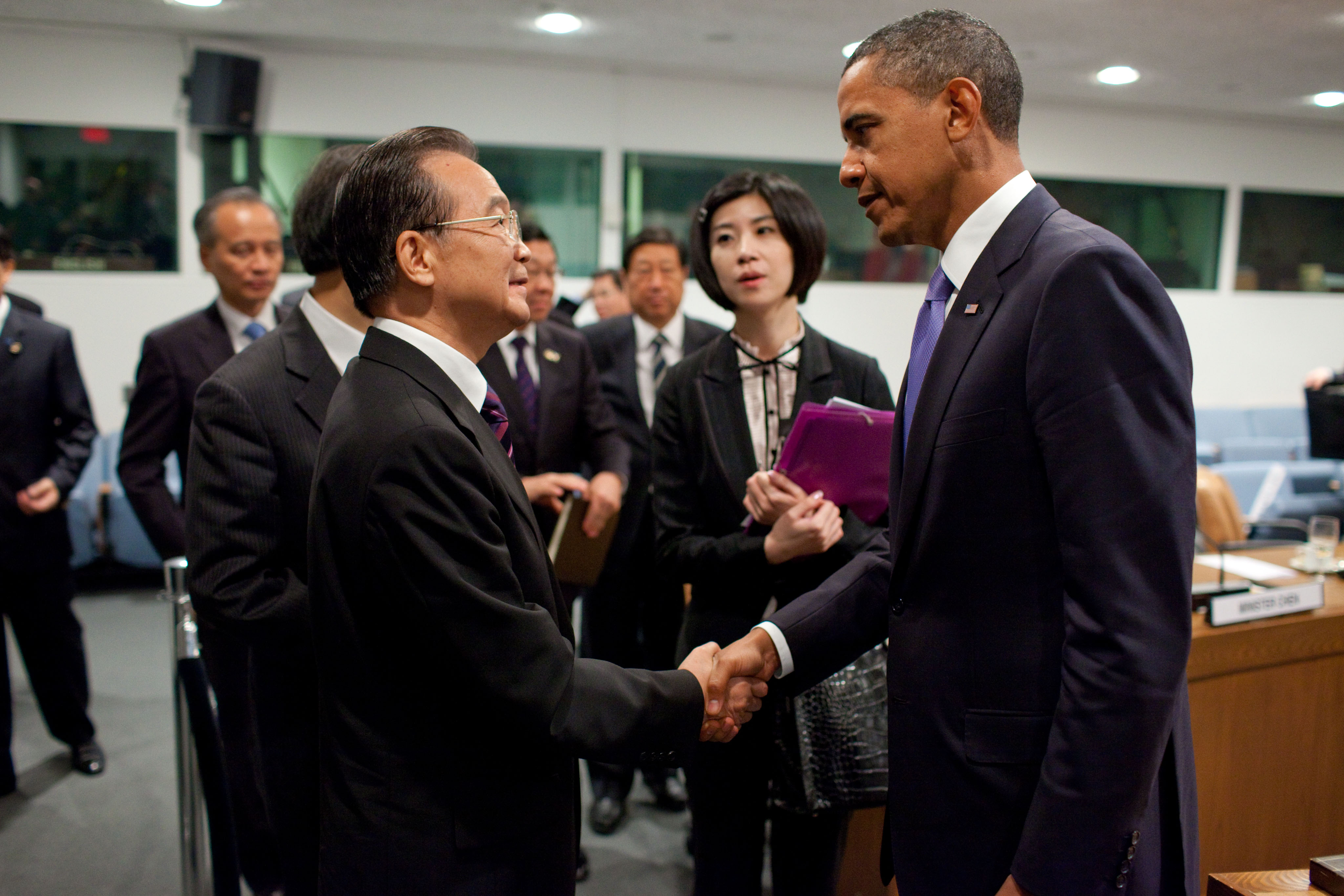
Wen with US President Barack Obama in 2010

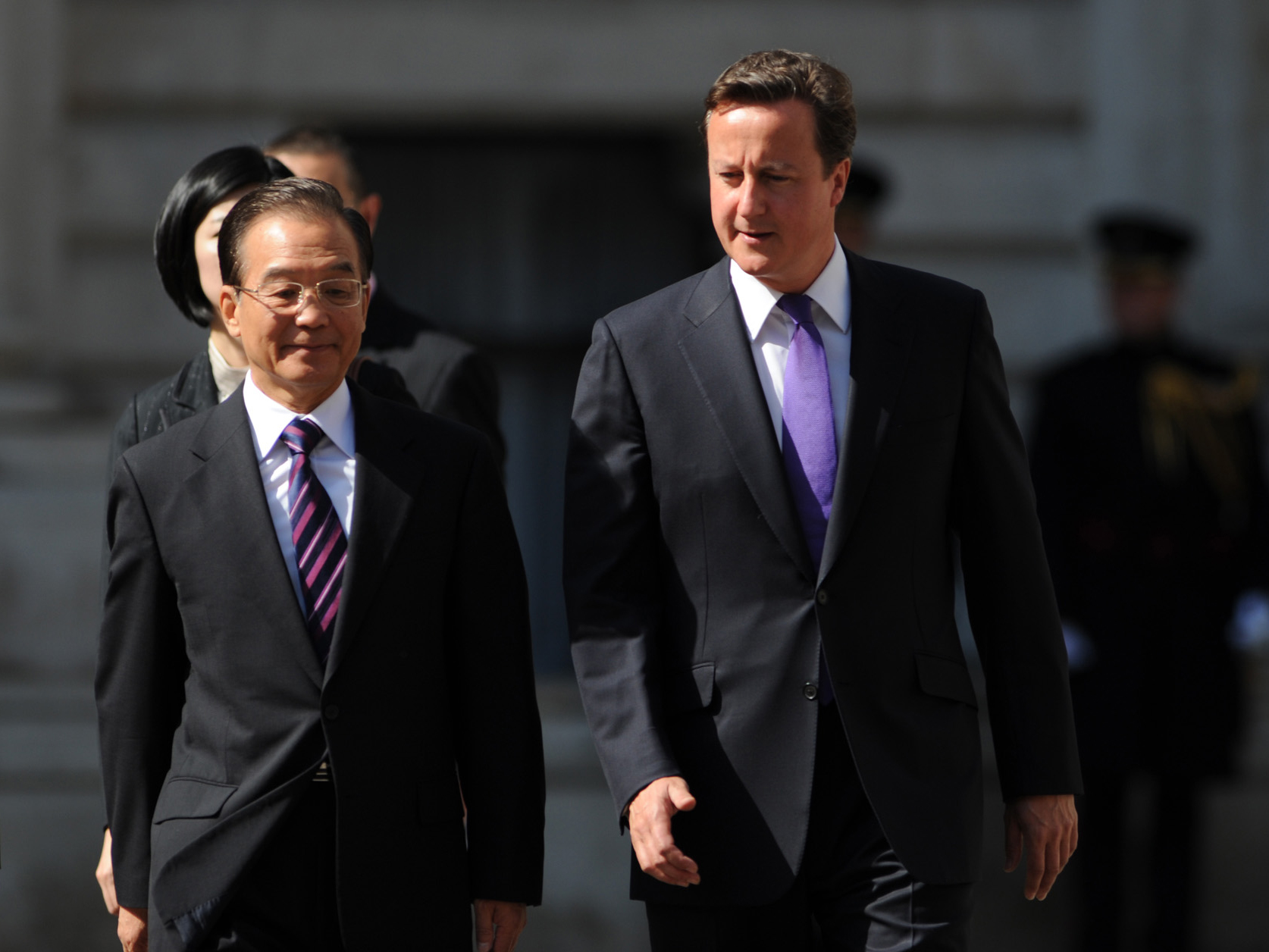
Wen with UK Prime Minister David Cameron in 2011

In December, in what was seen as a mild rebuke of Canadian Prime Minister Stephen Harper during the latter's working visit to China, Wen stated, "This is your first trip to China and this is the first meeting between the Chinese Premier and the Canadian Prime Minister in almost five years. Five years is too long a time for China Canada relations." However, the interpretation that Wen rebuked Harper was later disputed in select newspaper editorials. Wen also traveled to the 2009 UN Climate Change Conference, where he met with U.S. President Barack Obama twice to secure an 11th-hour non-binding agreement on emissions cuts.

=== Bo Xilai incident ===
Wen is one of the main critics of Bo Xilai, then Party Secretary of Chongqing and a leading figure of the conservative faction within the communist party. Bo Xilai opposed many of Wen's policies when he was Minister of Commerce in the Wen Government. It was believed that Wen and Vice Premier Wu Yi both had a bad relationship with Bo Xilai, and both Wen and Wu successfully blocked Bo Xilai from becoming Vice Premier in 2008. After Wang Lijun incident in February 2012, Wen became one of the leading figures in the attempt to remove Bo Xilai, and he openly criticized local authority in Chongqing under the leadership of Bo Xilai during a press conference after 2012 National People's Congress on 14 March 2012. The day after the press conference, Bo Xilai was removed from his position in Chongqing and placed under house arrest. Eventually Bo Xilai was expelled from the party in September 2012 and sentenced to life imprisonment in September 2013.

=== Retirement ===
After 18th Party Congress in November 2012, Wen stepped down as a member of the Politburo Standing Committee. In March 2013, Wen retired from politics after Li Keqiang succeeded him as Premier of China.

== Political views ==
Wen is considered to be the most outspoken reformist politician in post-1989 China. Domestic and foreign media variously described Wen as "populist" and in touch with the needs of ordinary people. On most social issues Wen seems to be moderate, with his brand of policies based around societal harmony as prescribed by the Scientific Development Concept, the leading ideology of the administration.

In the first term of his Premiership Wen's attitudes towards political reform seemed ambivalent. He remarked that "the socialist system will continue in China for the next 100 years", although later, in a press conference at the 2007 National People's Congress, he stated that "democracy is one of the basic goals of the socialist system". Furthermore, in an interview in September 2008, Wen acknowledged that the democratic system in China needs to be improved, where the power "truly belongs to the people" through the construction of an independent judicial system and for the government to accept criticism from the people. Wen, seen as a former ally of Premier Zhao Ziyang, was likely supportive of the latter's political rehabilitation; however, he rarely mentioned Zhao publicly during his premiership. On the subject of Taiwan, he reputedly believed in gradual negotiations. On the subject of Tibet, he toed the party line in condemning the exiled Dalai Lama for inciting "separatist violence".

Science, democracy, rule of law, freedom and human rights are not concepts unique to capitalism. Rather, they are common values pursued by mankind in the long historical process and they are the fruits of human civilization. It is only that at different historical stages and in different countries, they are achieved through different means and in different forms.

— Wen Jiabao, Our Historical Tasks at the primary stage of socialism and Several Issues Concerning China's Foreign Policy

Xinhua published articles in early 2007 on the direction of national development. The authorship of the articles was attributed separately to Wen, particularly 26 February piece "Our Historical Tasks at the Primary Stage of Socialism and Several Issues Concerning China's Foreign Policy". The article advanced Wen's "peace doctrine" in global affairs, as well as what appeared to be inclinations towards fostering social democracy and advocacy of universal values. This was suspected as a sign that Wen has some differing viewpoints to the official party line – that values are relativistic and that "Chinese values" are not necessarily the same as "Western values," and that universal values is thus an empty concept. The debate continues to rage in Chinese political circles today, with neo-leftist thinkers such as Chinese Academy of Social Sciences President Chen Kuiyuan criticizing Wen's advocacy of universal values, saying that it relegates Chinese values and thinking as an inferior alternative to supposedly more "correct" Western norms.

Wen is perceived by some observers as a liberal voice in China's ruling elite. Wen has openly talked about democracy and increased freedoms in his speeches and interviews with foreign correspondents, although much of it was deemed "sensitive" commentary and censored in state media. Wen remarked that "someone who speaks is not a criminal, someone who listens is duly warned" (Chinese: 言者无罪，闻者足戒, which alludes to the classical work Shi Jing) at an internal party conference in 2009, an event reported on Xinhua and other state networks. His remarks triggered debate from netizens, as it seemed to contravene the practices of the Communist Party, particularly in its suppression of dissent. Analysts noted that Wen's message was aimed at party members, and not necessarily the general public because Wen believes freedom of speech has deteriorated since Hu Jintao's accession to power and has negatively affected China's political landscape and international reputation. His comments also ostensibly addressed the pervasive "fake-talking" present in Chinese political circles, in an attempt to curb systemic and institutional woes stemming from officials who are afraid to speak the truth.

Wen has progressively amplified his liberal rhetoric as his Premiership continued, remarking in August 2010 that "Without political reform, China may lose what it has already achieved through economic restructuring". Wen's comments were largely censored in state media, but he gained support from a group of some 23 party elders in October, who denounced the authorities' censorship of Wen's remarks in an open letter to the National People's Congress.

In an interview with Fareed Zakaria on CNN's Global Public Square television program aired in 2008, Wen made the following statement: "I have summed up my political ideals into the following four sentences. To let everyone lead a happy life with dignity. To let everyone feel safe and secure. To let the society be one with equity and justice. And to let everyone have confidence in the future. In spite of the various discussions and views in the society, and in spite of some resistance, I will act in accordance with these ideals unswervingly, and advance within the realm of my capabilities political restructuring. I will like to tell you the following two sentences to reinforce my view on this point. I will not fall in spite of the strong wind and harsh rain, and I will not yield until the last day of my life." When asked by Zakaria whether or not China would have competitive elections in the next 25 years, Wen stated that it would be "hard to predict" what would happen in that timeframe.

At the 2012 National People's Congress, Wen mentioned the word "reform" 70 times. He remarked that China must "press ahead with both economic structural reforms and political structural reforms, in particular reforms on the leadership system of the Party and the country." There is also indication from party insiders that Wen has been pushing the case for the political rehabilitation of the Tiananmen Square protests of 1989.

== Public image and political influence ==
Wen has been described as a populist by most observers. His quick responses and visits to the scenes of various disasters, including the 2008 Sichuan earthquake, has earned him a considerable reputation as an approachable leader in touch with the experiences of the masses. Wen engages regularly with locals on his trips to various provinces domestically as well as foreign visits; he played baseball and badminton with Japanese and South Korean citizens during visits to those countries. "Whether taking a stroll or swimming, it puts me at ease both mentally and physically and helps me handle my heavy workload," Wen had remarked.

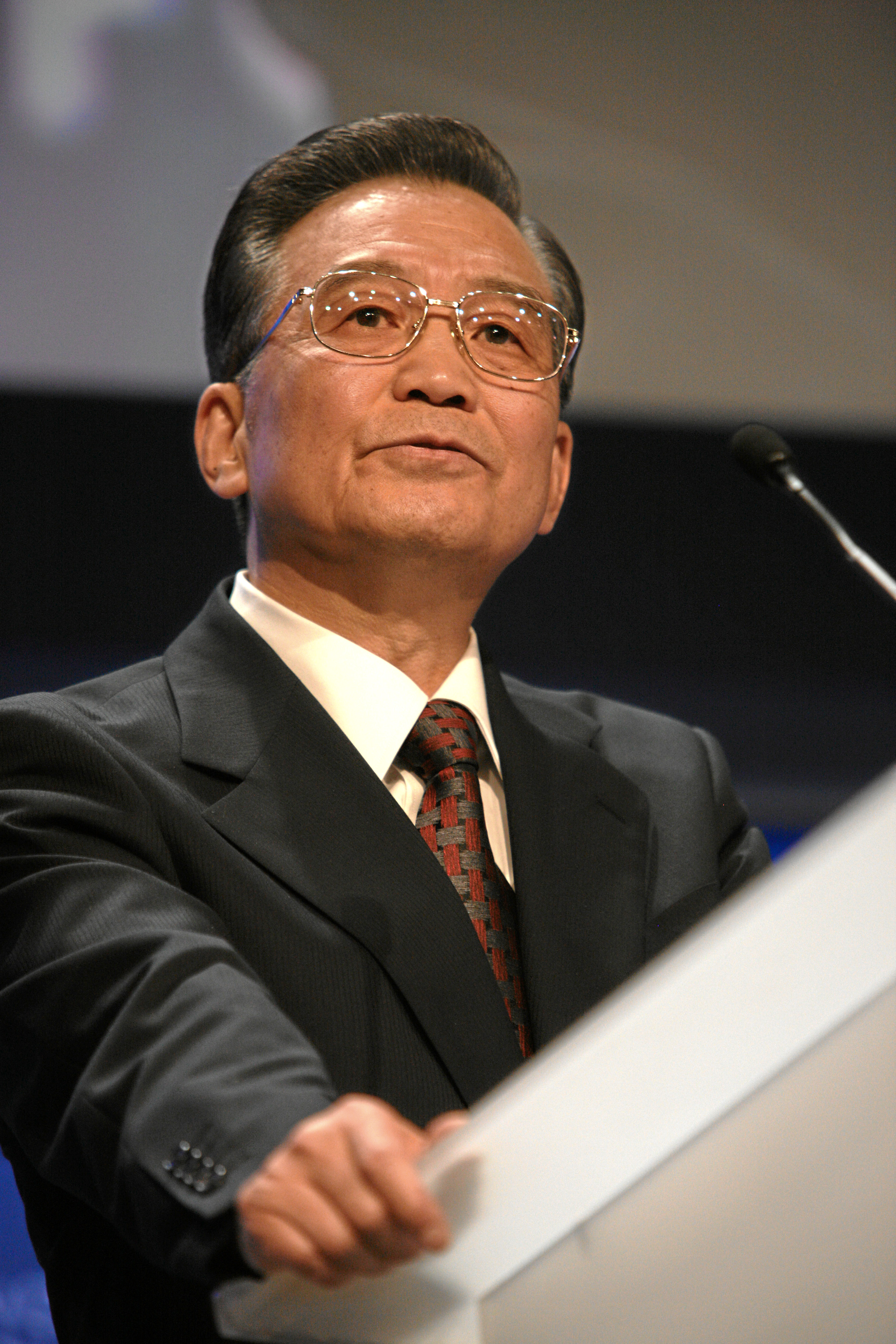
Wen at the World Economic Forum in Davos, Switzerland in 2009

Wen's public image has been criticized by Chinese dissident Yu Jie, who charged that Wen's rhetoric is insincere and empty. Dissidents such as Yu allege that Wen's parade of appearances on Chinese media is a carefully managed public relations campaign designed to distract people from real issues. They say that through use of Wen's charisma, the government hopes to showcase cosmetic solutions to much larger, systemic issues in order to placate public opinion. They also point out that Wen's words are rarely translated into deeds. On the other hand, Li Datong, a pro-democracy advocate, in an interview with the Associated Press, stated that "among the top Chinese leaders, who else speaks about democracy? Who else speaks about universal values and freedom?... Wen is the only one." Li believes that Wen is genuinely calling for democratic reform but he is powerless to make major decisions on the matter due to internal opposition. Wen's family members have also been subject to gossip and scrutiny outside of mainland China. Taiwanese media zoomed in on his wife's alleged personal fortunes from her jewelry business, while the Financial Times reported on a private equity firm called New Horizon Capital co-founded by Wen's son Wen Yunsong.

When he was the head of the Chinese government, Wen was considered to be one of the most powerful statesmen in the world. In 2006, he was named to the Time 100 list. In 2009, Wen was named one of ten people and the only non-American in a list compiled by ABC of people who shaped the U.S. economy the most since 2000. Wen also topped a list of "10 leaders to watch" in 2010 released 19 January by Eurasia Group, a global political risk research and consulting firm. Behind that U.S. President Barack Obama came second. In August 2010, Wen was named "The Man of the People" by Newsweek. In October 2010, Wen was a person selected on the Time's cover that the title was "Wen's World". In 2011, Wen was ranked 14th in Forbes list of the World's Most Powerful People.

In 2021, Chinese authorities censored a tribute that Wen had written for his mother in the small paper Macau Herald.

== Personal life and family wealth ==
Wen is married to Zhang Peili, whom he met while working as a government geologist in Gansu. Zhang is a jewelry expert and has played a prominent role in the nation's diamond trade. She rarely appears with Wen in public. They have a son, Wen Yunsong, and a daughter, Wen Ruchun (Lily Chang).

In October 2012, The New York Times reported that Wen's family controlled financial assets worth at least US$2.7 billion during his time as premier. In response, a Chinese government spokesman stated that the report "blackens China's name and has ulterior motives", and the websites of The New York Times were censored in mainland China. Lawyers representing Wen's family also denied the report's content. Wen personally wrote a letter submitted to the Politburo Standing Committee asking for an investigation to the claim and willing to make his family assets public. Professor Zhu Lijia, of the Chinese Academy of Governance, suggest that this is Wen's last try to push the passing of the "Sunshine law", which would require government officials to release their financial information to the public. Professor Jean-Pierre Cabestan of Hong Kong's Baptist University questioned the timing of the report and suggested "It looks very much [like] some people close to Bo Xilai are trying to throw mud at the reformists".

Wen is known for his adept use of Chinese poetry to convey political and diplomatic messages, when responding to journalists, or simply to begin a speech.

== See also ==
- Politics of China
- History of China (2002–2012)
- Hu–Wen Administration

Government offices
Preceded by Zhu Rongji	Premier of China; 2003–2013	Succeeded by Li Keqiang
Preceded by Zhu Rongji	Director of the National Defence Mobilisation Commission; 2003–2013	Succeeded by Li Keqiang
New office	Director of the National Energy Commission; 2010–2013	Succeeded by Li Keqiang
Party political offices
Preceded by Wang Zhaoguo	Director of the General Office of the Chinese Communist Party; 1986–1993	Succeeded by Zeng Qinghong
Preceded by Zhu Rongji	Director of the Central Institutional Organization Commission; 2003–2013	Succeeded by Li Keqiang
Order of precedence
Preceded by Wu Bangguo as Chairman of the Standing Committee of the National People's Congress	Rank of the Chinese Communist Party; 16th, 17th Politburo Standing Committee	Succeeded by Jia Qinglin as Chairman of the National Committee of the Chinese People's Political Consultative Conference
