= Zhang Peili =

Chinese geologist

- 张培莉
- Born: 1941 (age 84–85); Lanzhou, Gansu, China
- Education: Lanzhou University
- Spouse: Wen Jiabao
- Children: 2
- Scientific career
- Fields: Geology; Jewelry identification

Zhang Peili (simplified Chinese: 张培莉; traditional Chinese: 張培莉; pinyin: Zhāng Péilì; born 1941), or Zhang Beili (simplified Chinese: 张蓓莉; traditional Chinese: 張蓓莉; pinyin: Zhāng Bèilì), is a Chinese geologist and the wife of former Chinese Premier Wen Jiabao.

Zhang created the principal institutions which regulate the gemstone trade in China, the National Gemstone Testing Center and the Shanghai Diamond Exchange. She was formerly the vice-president of the Chinese Jewelry Association, and president and CEO of Beijing Diamond Jewelries Co., a state-owned company which has operations in both the mainland and Hong Kong.

== Biography ==
Zhang met Wen when he was working in Jiuquan as part of Gansu's Bureau of Geology. Being described as a strong-willed woman, her personality is in strict contrast to that of her husband, who is fairly introverted and modest. Zhang is never seen on any official occasions with the Premier. Zhang and Wen have a son and a daughter, Wen Yunsong and Wen Ruchun.

In 2007 Taiwan's TVBS found Zhang to be wearing a bracelet worth over 2 million RMB (approximately US$300,000) at a jewelry convention, and she was in Taiwan to buy a necklace valued 14 million RMB (approximately US$2,240,000).

Her private gemstone and jewellery business was successful, and after her husband attained high position, her fortune grew rapidly. Despite her great wealth she dresses modestly. According to the United States diplomatic cables leak, Wen has sought to divorce Zhang and is "disgusted" by how she has used his name to extract huge commissions in the diamond trade.

=== Government and business activities ===
As manager of the National Gemstone Testing Center in Beijing and the China Mineral and Gem Corporation a state-owned enterprise Zhang was in a pivotal position which gave her the power to facilitate or deny entry by global diamond firms such as Cartier or De Beers into the regulated Chinese market.

In addition, using her position as manager of China Mineral and Gem Corporation, she facilitated a number of startups such as Beijing Diamond, a retailer; Shenzhen Diamond; and Sino-Diamond, a diamond importer, in the jewellery and gem business which her colleagues and family members were given the opportunity to invest in. Investments in other industries were financed by sale of interests in the diamond firms to wealthy businessmen. There is no evidence that her husband, the Chinese Premier Wen Jiabao, played a role in advancing Zhang and her friends and relatives' fortunes, but, according to interviews by New York Times reporters with former associates, Zhang has freely traded on the association during the decades of the 1990s and 2000s implying that government favor followed those showing favor to her family and associates.

Honorary titles
Preceded by Lao An	Spouse of the Premier of the People's Republic of China; 2005–2013	Succeeded by Cheng Hong
