= Wang Gongquan =

Chinese human rights activist

- 王功权
- Born: 22 October 1961 (age 64); Gongzhuling, Jilin Province
- Education: Jilin University of Technology
- Occupations: Venture capitalist (retired), Founder and CSO of Tsingpu
- Known for: Venture investment, civil rights advocacy

Wang Gongquan (Chinese: 王功权; pinyin: Wáng Gōngquán) is a billionaire liberal activist in China. He is a main leader and financial backer of the New Citizens' Movement. He was arrested on 13 September 2013 for allegedly "disturbing order in public space".

== Biography ==
Wang Gongquan was born in Wanlong Village, Xiangshui Township, Gongzhuling, Jilin Province. He graduated from Jilin University of Technology in 1984 and landed a job in Jilin government. He quit the job in 1988 to start his business in Hainan. He was detained and questioned for almost a year after the 1989 Tiananmen Square protests and massacre. He became a prominent businessman with success in real estate and venture investment.

Later his focus shifted from business to civil activism and played a significant role in the New Citizens' Movement. On 13 September 2013, Wang was detained for allegedly "disturbing order in public space" and he was formally arrested on 20 October 2013. His arrest became big news domestically and internationally.

Wang is listed in 2013's Top 100 Global Thinkers by Foreign Policy.

== Business Experience ==
In 1988, Wang Gongquan quit his government job and went to Hainan for business endeavor. In 1991, he co-founded Vantone Industry Group, one of China's leading real estate developers, which he managed from 1991 to 1995, serving as president, vice chairman of the board, and honorary chairman of the board. Wang was a co-founder and general partner with IDG Technology Venture Investment, Inc from 1999 to 2005. He built and managed CDH Venture Partners from its inception in 2005.

Wang serves as a director of CDG Holdings Limited, Xueda Education Group, CDH Venture GP I Company Limited and CDH Venture GP II Company Limited, and was previously a director of ChinaEDU Corporation, China Civilink, China Finance Online Co., Ltd. and 3721.com.

Around the age of retirement in 2015, Wang founded Tsingpu. With "back to the original" as concept, Tsingpu is a provider of a humanistic vacation lifestyle.

== Civil Rights Activism ==
In 2005, Wang Gongquan became a research in Gongmeng (Open Constitution Initiative).

In 2008, Wang initiated the "Equal Rights for Education" campaign, whose goal is to abolish the hukou constraint in gaokao (college admission exam) for students in migrant families. After several years' hard work, Ministry of Education revised the policy in August 2012 under the public pressure, subsequently, all cities and provinces except Beijing and Shanghai removed or promised to remove the constraint.

In 2009, Wang sponsored the magazine "Civil Society Review". This magazine was revoked by the authority.

In June 2010, Wang and Xu Zhiyong, Teng Biao, Li Xiongbing, Li Fangping, Xu Youyu and Zhang Shihe (Laohumiao), initiated the "Citizens' Pledge", calling for the awakening and improvement of Chinese citizens' civil rights awareness. This event is usually regarded as the start of the New Citizens' Movement (even though it was prior to the coinage of the term).

In 2011, Wang spent a year as a visiting scholar at Columbia University, conducting research on civil society and democratic transition.

On 11 September 2012, all of Wang's microblog accounts in China were deleted. He had 1.56 million followers at Sina Weibo at time of closing.

On 16 July 2013, Xu Zhiyong was detained for allegedly "disturbing order in public space". Wang Gongquan, Mao Yushi, Xiaoshu, He Sanwei and Yang Zili issued an open letter calling for the release of Dr Xu and other arrested citizens. More than 3000 people have signed the petition.

On 13 September 2013, Beijing police searched Wang Gongquan's Beijing residence and detained him in the evening. Liu Suli, Guo Yushan, and Xiaoshu issued a statement calling for the release of Wang; nearly 1000 people signed the statement in four days. Wang was formally arrested on 20 October 2013.

== Other ==
Wang Gongquan is passionate with poetry. He once donated 10 million RMB to sponsor the research and compilation of Chinese classic poetry in the first half of 20th century. Wang writes Chinese classic poetry as well.

As the advisor of Inclusive Education, Wang is also a philanthropist. He promotes the concept of inclusive education in China and donates frequently to different educational charitable organizations.

== See also ==
- New Citizens' Movement (China)
