= Gongzhuling railway station =

Railway station in Gongzhuling, China

Coordinates: 43.5066°N 124.8057°E

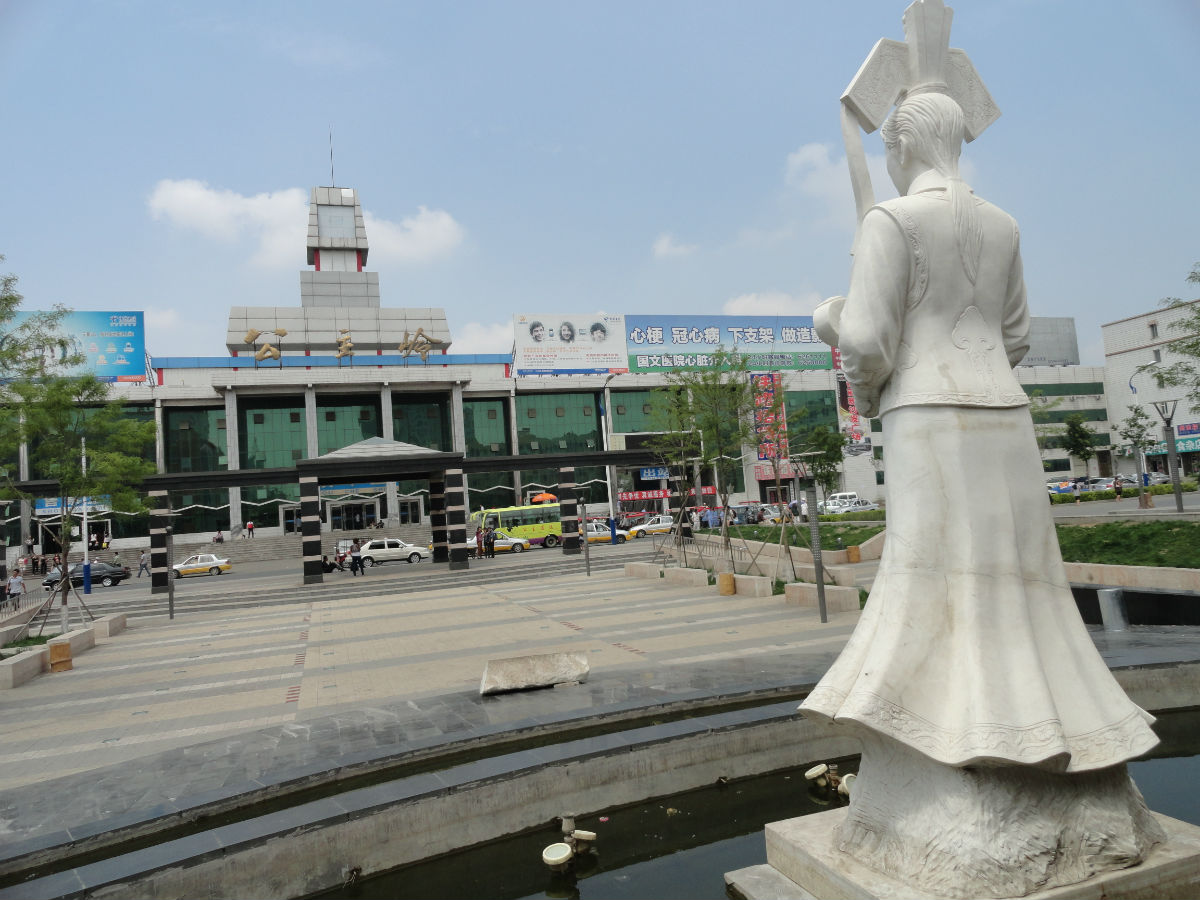
Gongzhuling railway station building

Gongzhuling railway station (simplified Chinese: 公主岭站; traditional Chinese: 公主嶺站) is a railway station in Gongzhuling, Changchun, Jilin Province, China.

Preceding station	China Railway	Following station
Siping towards Beijing	Beijing–Harbin railway	Changchun towards Harbin
