= Xia Lin =

Chinese lawyer

- 夏霖
- Born: 1969 or 1970 (age 55–56)
- Occupation: Lawyer
- Criminal charge: Fraud
- Criminal penalty: 12 years' imprisonment
- Criminal status: Imprisoned
- Spouse: Lin Ru

Xia Lin (Chinese: 夏霖), is a Chinese lawyer known for taking on human rights cases. Among his more prominent clients was the artist and activist Ai Weiwei. In late 2016 he was sentenced to 12 years in prison for fraud.

== Career ==
Xia represented Pu Zhiqiang, a lawyer who was detained for privately discussing the 1989 Tiananmen Square massacre. In 2009 he won a case on behalf of a hotel worker who killed a government official who had tried to rape her.

He also represented the prominent contemporary artist Ai Weiwei. The two met in 2010 as Ai prepared to sue the Sichuan public security bureau for violence.

== Imprisonment ==
Xia was detained in 2014 after he agreed to defend Guo Yushan, a Beijing activist. Chinese authorities have cracked down on lawyers and rights activists in recent years, jailing some on charges of subversion against the ruling Chinese Communist Party. Xia was charged defrauding four people of 4.8 million RMB. Xia said that the money was legitimate loans and that the charge was revenge against his legal work. He pleaded not guilty.

Xia was sentenced to 12 years in prison. He was also fined 120,000 RMB and ordered to pay 4.8 million RMB to fraud victims.

== Reactions ==
Xia's supporters, and various human rights groups, stated that the harsh sentence is intended to intimidate other would-be human rights activists. A spokesman for Amnesty International said that the arrest was "certainly not about fraud". He continued: "That's a smokescreen to cover the government's real intent to go after any lawyer ready to take on high-profile human rights cases. Xia had been involved in many cases and that's why he was given a horrendously high sentence."

Chinese state media did not report on Xia's sentencing.

Ai Weiwei called the sentence "absurd", and wrote that the public security bureau's pursual of the case "violated protocol and was illegal" as "the party that offered him the loan should be the litigant in this kind of civil dispute". He related the case to his 2011 arrest, which he alleged was also illegal under Chinese law. He criticized the lack of an independent judiciary in China, calling the justice system "a tool that operates under the Communist Party's directives".

== Personal life ==
Xia is married to Lin Ru. After Xia's sentencing, she wept outside the court and asserted her husband's innocence.
