= CDH Investments =

Chinese alternative asset management firm

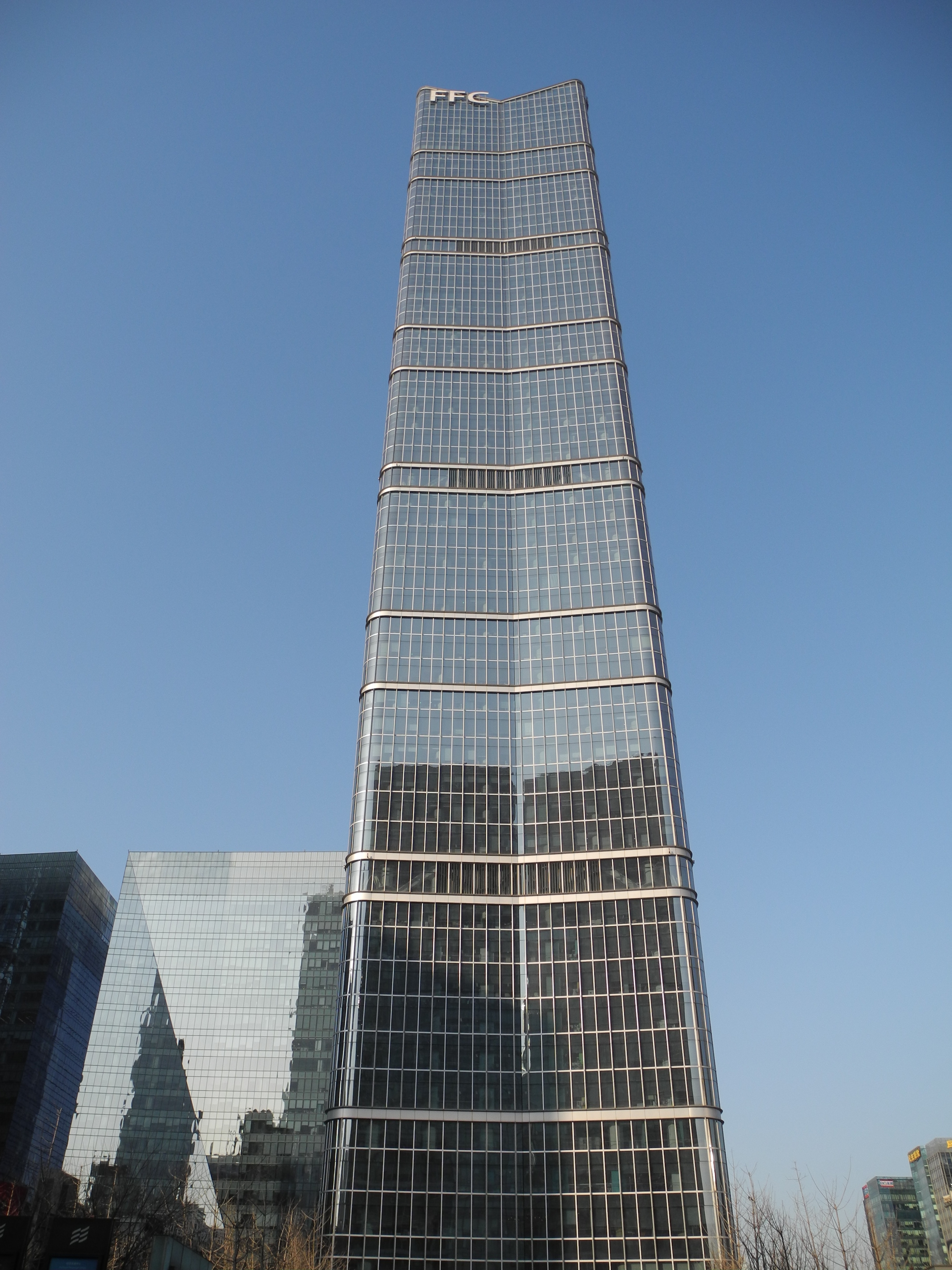
- Headquarters at Fortune Financial Center
- Native name: 鼎晖投资基金管理公司
- Type: Private, limited liability
- Industry: Alternative investment
- Founded: 2002; 24 years ago
- Headquarters: Fortune Financial Center; 5 Dongsanhuan Central Road; Chaoyang District, Beijing, China
- Products: Private equity, venture capital, public equity, mezzanine, real estate, wealth management
- AUM: $27 billion (2022)
- Website: cdhfund.com

CDH Investments (CDH, 鼎晖投资基金管理公司) is a major Chinese alternative asset management firm based in Beijing, China. It specializes in private equity, venture capital and credit products. CDH invests across a range of sectors and regions. As of March 2015, CDH manages over RMB 100 billion of investor capital across its various investment platforms.

Founded in 2002, CDH is a diversified alternative asset manager covering private equity, venture capital, mezzanine, real estate, and wealth management. Its investor base includes sovereign wealth funds, pension funds, insurers, endowments, family offices and fund of funds from China, North & South America, Europe, Middle East, Australia and Asia.

CDH is headquartered at Fortune Financial Center, 5 Dongsanhuan Central Road, Beijing, China, with additional offices in Shanghai, Shenzhen, Hong Kong, Singapore, and Jakarta.

== History ==
In 1992, Wu Shangzhi, then Senior Investment Officer at the World Bank Group's Direct Investment Division, decided to establish an investment firm in China. He approached GIC with a fund raising proposal. Instead of considering an equity commitment, GIC suggested Wu to join China International Capital Corporation, an investment bank that GIC was involved in the preparatory work related to the firm's establishment at that point. Wu led the direct investment business at China International Capital Corporation until it was split off by the firm in 2001, when China Securities Regulatory Commission prohibited investment bank from doing private equity investment.

In 2002, CDH was established with six founding partners including Wu Shangzhi and Jiao Zhen, who had worked together at China International Capital Corporation's Direct Investment Division since 1995. Other shareholders include GIC, China National Investment & Guaranty Co Ltd, and Capital Z Partners. As of 2014, CDH had retained all six founding partners within the firm, despite famously losing its head of venture capital, Wang Gongquan, who ran away with his mistress.

In 2003, CDH raised $102 million for its first standalone fund. Deals that year included stakes in sportswear company Li-Ning, display advertising firm Focus Media and Mengniu Dairy. According to Reuters, this first fund returned approximately 3.5 times its investors' money.

In 2006, CDH and Goldman Sachs invested $256 million in a controlling stake in a struggling meat producer, then known as Shuanghui Group, along with Temasek and New Horizon Capital. That buyout deal, one of the first of its kind in China, sparked controversy as opponents claimed the country was selling assets too cheaply to foreign investors. Goldman sold half its stake back to CDH in 2009 for five times what it originally paid.

CDH institutional investors have included California Public Employees' Retirement System, the Oregon State Treasury, the Texas County & District Retirement System, and Canada Pension Plan Investment Board. As of 2014, 75 percent of CDH's private equity funds came from international investors. That year, with a target cap at $2 billion, CDH's fifth USD PE fund was closed at a hard cap of $2.5 billion due to over-subscription.

== Businesses and affiliates ==
CDH's family of funds includes private equity, venture capital, real estate, mezzanine and credit products.

=== Private equity ===
CDH manages five funds denominated in United States Dollars funds and two funds denominated in Chinese Yuan (RMB), with cumulative assets under management in excess of US$15 billion.

Fund	Vintage Year	Committed Capital (mn)
CDH China Fund, L.P.	2002	USD 102
CDH China Growth Capital Fund II, L.P.	2005	USD 310
CDH China Fund III, L.P.	2007	USD 1,600
CDH first domestic RMB-denominated private equity fund	2008	RMB 4,000
CDH Fund IV, L.P.	2010	USD 1,400
CDH second domestic RMB-denominated private equity fund	2012	RMB 8,000
CDH Fund V, L.P.	2014	USD 2,620

=== Venture capital ===
CDH established its venture capital business in 2006 and currently manages more than US$1 billion of assets through several USD and RMB funds. The investment focus covers telecom, media, technology, and health care sectors.

Fund	Vintage Year	Committed Capital (mn)
CDH Venture Partners, L.P.	2007	USD 210
CDH Venture Partners II, L.P.	2008	USD 505
CDH first domestic RMB-denominated venture fund	2010	RMB 1,300
CDH Venture Partners III, L.P.	2012	USD 90

=== Real estate ===
CDH's real estate business was set up in 2009 and currently manages more than US$700 million of assets through several USD and RMB funds, focusing on development projects with a sector mix of approximately 50/50 residential and commercial properties. CDH has invested in 13 real estate projects in 12 cities across China, as of June 30, 2014.

Fund	Vintage Year	Committed Capital (mn)
CDH first RMB-denominated real estate fund	2009	RMB 420
CDH second RMB-denominated real estate fund	2010	RMB 1,000
CDH third RMB-denominated real estate fund	2012	RMB 1,200

=== Credit ===
In 2011, CDH launched its mezzanine and credit business and currently manages more than US$640 million of assets through several USD and RMB funds, with a focus on high-yield debt solutions to finance real estate, energy resources and equity mergers and acquisitions.

=== Public equity ===
Cephei Capital was founded in 2006 with the support from CDH. Cephei focuses on investing in Chinese companies in the secondary market. Cephei now manages separate accounts for a number of Qualified Foreign Institutional Investors (QFII) in the China A-share market. At the same time, Cephei also manages a variety of long-biased public equity funds and collectively manages more than US$1.5 billion in assets.

== Investments ==
CDH invests across industries including information technology, media, modern services, innovative engineering technology, telecommunication technology and services, new media, industrial manufacturing, education, finance, fast growing high-tech and services, energy, clean technology, healthcare, medical, retail, consumer product and services, and agricultural industry.

Since inception, CDH has invested in or acquired hundreds of companies including Hang Seng Electronics, Mengniu Dairy, Li-Ning, Focus Media, Yurun Food, Yongle, China Merchants Bank, Belle International, LDK, AirMedia, CNInsure, Joyoung, Shanshui Cement, Modern Dairy, Hanting Hotel, Kanghui Medical, TSL Jewelry, M&G Stationery, Xueda Education, Qihoo 360, Midea, WH Group, Luye Pharma, Nanfu Battery, and Baroque Japan Limited.
