= ChinaAid.org =

International human rights organization

- Formation: 2002
- Founder: Bob Fu
- Type: 501(c)(3) organization
- Tax ID no.: 42-1560745
- Purpose: Human rights for Chinese citizens
- Location: Midland, Texas
- Region served: United States; China; Taiwan
- Official languages: English, Standard Mandarin
- Key people: Bob Fu, Doug Robison
- Website: chinaaid.org

CHINA AID ASSOCIATION, INC. (Chinese: 對華援助協會; pinyin: Duì Huá Yuánzhù Xiéhuì), also known as ChinaAid.org, is a registered entity in Midland, Texas, United States. It was described as focusing on raising awareness of human rights abuses, providing support and legal aid to Chinese prisoners of conscience and their families, and promoting the rule of law and religious freedom throughout China. According to Bob Fu, the ChinaAid.org Association aims to "spiritually and legally [equip]" Chinese people "to defend their faith and freedom", with legal reforms ultimately "softening the soil for the Gospel" in China.

== History ==
After fleeing to Hong Kong as an underground church pastor and a former student leader at Tiananmen Square, Bob Fu immigrated to America with his wife, and founded ChinaAid.org in 2002 in Philadelphia. The organization's headquarters were relocated to Midland, Texas, in 2004. Fu believed Midland would be "much safer" after he allegedly found Chinese agents tailing him in Philadelphia.

The organization's 2010 tax listing lists its purpose as raising funds to pay the legal funds of indicted Christians in China. The foundation funds house churches in China which dissent from the government approved Protestant and Catholic churches of China. To this end, it publishes a house church magazine with a distribution of 80,000 in China. It also provides money, training, and pen pal programs to Chinese religious leaders and their families. As a matter of policy, it opposes forced abortions and compulsory sterilizations.

In 2010, ChinaAid.org received $1.28 million in contributions and grants and $84,741 in other funds. Their staff consisted of 15 paid employees and 40 volunteers. Two years later in 2012, ChinaAid.org had a budget of $1.5 million; offices in Midland, Washington, D.C., and Los Angeles; and a full-time staff of "dozens" in China and more than six in America. The organization runs an annual ChinaAid.org gala at the Midland Country Club, which raised $400,000 in 2012. Most of the money comes from Midland oil and gas industry donors; in relative terms, ChinaAid.org does not receive much support from the Chinese American community. The oil town was the childhood home of George W. Bush and houses many evangelical pressure groups that advocate on behalf of Christians in non-Christian countries like North Korea. Many residents are on the board of ChinaAid.org.

The human rights lawyer Li Baiguang died in February 2018.

In 2019, ChinaAid.org, represented by Bob Fu, received the Democracy Award for its Christian advocacy in promoting religious freedom in China.

== Organization and philosophy ==
ChinaAid.org keeps an in-house staff of five to ten at their Midland location, connecting with a network of volunteers across China. According to the ECFA, the organization reported total revenue of $1,426,028, with $1,411,410 coming from donations in 2013. Expenses that year were $1,493,194. ChinaAid.org offers financial and legal support for house church pastors, political dissidents, and prisoners of conscience. Most of ChinaAid.org's donations come from oil and gas industry philanthropists. Other donations come from local churches or other Christian ministries.

ChinaAid.org currently partners with various other ministries and human rights groups, such as National Endowment for Democracy, Freedom House, The Voice of the Martyrs, Christian Solidarity Worldwide, Release International, and International Christian Concern.

According to the organization's website, ChinaAid.org's mission is threefold: to "expose, encourage, and equip." The news and reporting side of ChinaAid.org's operations seek to "expose the abuses" and reveal persecution and human rights abuses to raise awareness of injustices perpetuated in China. Financial contributions and support for individuals and groups who have been targeted "encourages the abused." Finally, ChinaAid.org organizes training in leadership and rule of law for organizations in China to "equip the leaders."

== Initiatives ==
=== China 18 ===
The China 18 are a diverse group of prisoners of conscience supported by a ChinaAid.org-led coalition. The members of the group include human rights lawyers, Tibetans, Uyghurs, political activists, and underground church leaders. The China 18 campaign is intended to raise awareness for the situations of these individuals and their families, to represent thousands of others in similar situations, and to press for their release. The 18-person roster is updated to reflect new cases as members are freed or deceased. As of September 2015, the 18 cases of the China 18 were Wang Bingzhang, Peng Ming, Liu Ping, Liu Xiaobo, Zhu Yufu, Liu Xianbin, Yang Tianshui, Yang Rongli, Guo Quan, Guo Feixiong, Tang Jingling, Li Chang, Alimjan Yimit, Gulmira Imin, Khenpo Karma Tsewang, Gao Yu, Zhang Shaojie.

Previous members of the China 18 who have been released are Lobsang Tsering, Chen Kegui, Wang Zhiwen, Gao Zhisheng, and Dhondup Wangchen. As of September 2015, only one previous member has died while still in prison, Tenzin Delek Rinpoche.

=== Free Gao ===
In 2009, ChinaAid.org headed a campaign to free former China 18 member Gao Zhisheng, including a petition to the United States Senate, then Secretary of State Hillary Clinton, and the Chinese embassy which received over 50,000 signatures. Gao was freed in August 2014, but was moved into house arrest and remains in poor health from his imprisonment.

=== Advocacy Events ===
ChinaAid.org leads advocacy efforts to promote awareness and garner support for cases and issues, often partnering with other human rights or China-focused NGOs. Often these efforts include drawing up petitions, writing open letters to important government officials, or hosting events. Frequent partners include other ministries and human rights groups, such as Freedom House, Reporters Without Borders, Amnesty International, Human Rights Watch, International Campaign for Tibet, and Uyghur Human Rights Project.

=== Chen Guangcheng ===
In 2012, ChinaAid.org was instrumental in gaining asylum in the US for dissident lawyer Chen Guangcheng after his research discovered 130,000 forced abortions in Shandong. The organization helped him flee house arrest and escape to the American Embassy in Beijing. With additional help from ChinaAid.org, he was able to escape to New York on a student visa. ChinaAid.org was often the first to release news and updates on Chen's condition and situation throughout his escape and relocation.
