= Ding Jiaxi =

Chinese civil rights activist

- 丁家喜
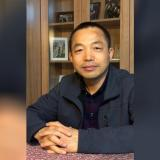
- Born: 17 August 1967 (age 59); Hubei, China
- Occupations: Legal scholar, lecturer
- Known for: Civil rights advocacy, advocacy of constitutionalism
- Movement: New Citizens Movement
- Criminal charges: Disruption of public order, subversion of state power (politically motivated)
- Criminal penalty: Imprisonment (3 1/2 years in 2013 and 12 years in 2022)

Ding Jiaxi (Chinese: 丁家喜; born 17 August 1967) is a Chinese civil rights activist known for co-organizing the New Citizens' Movement advocating for political change in China and having been sentenced in 2022 to 12 years in prison for his advocacy.

Ding holds a Bachelor and Master's degree in Engineering from Beihang University, specializing in aircraft manufacturing. While doing post-graduate studies in Beihang University, he simultaneously studied law and passed the law exam. In 1996, he transitioned to a legal career and worked at multiple law firms until co-founding the Beijing Dehong Law Firm in 2003 as a Senior Partner. By 2013, his law firm employed over 20 lawyers and had an annual income of 25 million yuan.

During his legal career, he advocated for the rights of migrant workers' children to participate in the college entrance exam locally where their parents work, instead of returning to where they came from. In 2012, when government corruption was a widely disucssed topic, he wrote a public letter together with Xu Zhiyong and others, calling on Xi Jinping and other top-level government officials to lead the way in dislosing their financial assets, which gathered over 7,000 signatures.

In April 2013, Ding was arrested on charges of "illegal gathering", whose cause was speculated by commentators to be related to his organizational role in public demonstrations demanding officials to disclose their assets. In April 2014, he was sentenced to three years and six months in prison for "gathering crowds to disrupt order in public places". He was released in 2016 after serving his sentence.

Ding was again detained in 2019, along with other human rights activists, after attending two days of meetings in Xiamen to discuss social issues, including the 2019 Hong Kong democracy protests, the U.S.-China trade war, and human rights. He was then sentenced to 12 years in prison in 2022 for subversion of state power. According to Ding's wife, evidence for charges against Ding and other detainees include "participating in a Telegram group chat, articles and online posts, and organizing classes in non-violent resistance."

Ding was awarded the 2023 Human Rights award from the Council of Bars and Law Societies of Europe and the Global Human Rights Defender Award from the U.S. Department of State the same year. In 2024, Ding was nominated for the Nobel Peace Prize by the chairs of Congressional-Executive Commission on China.

== Education and career ==
Ding Jiaxi holds a Bachelor’s and a Master’s degree in Engineering from Beihang University, specializing in aircraft manufacturing and jet-engine engineering.

From 1990 to 1996, he worked as an engineer at the Shenyang Aviation Industry Corporation and the Beijing Aviation Industry Corporation, during which time he also studied law and passed the bar exam. In 1996, he transitioned to a full-time legal career, practicing at various law firms in Beijing. In 2003, he co-founded the Beijing Dehong Law Firm, serving as a senior partner, with expertise in areas such as corporate mergers and acquisitions, investment, bankruptcy law, and intellectual property protection. By 2013, his law firm employed over 20 lawyers and had an annual income of 25 million yuan.

Ding has served as a member of the Corporate Restructuring Professional Committee of the Beijing Lawyers Association, a member of the Legal Affairs Committee of the Central Committee of the China Democratic League, Secretary-General of the Beihang Entrepreneurs Association, and Director of the Legal Committee of the Zhongguancun International Software Incubation Association.

== Civil rights advocacy ==
Ding had participated in the 1989 student demonstrations at Tiananmen Square but was not there when the military crushed the protest.

In 2011, Ding went to Fordham University as a visiting scholar at the law school. While outside China's Great Firewall, he had access to information previously not seen and began to see China differently than before. According to his wife, Luo Shengchun, "[Ding] completely changed. Now, everything in China was not okay."

Upon returning to China in late 2011, Ding began working with Xu Zhiyong, Teng Biao, and others to advance civil rights in China. He traveled widely in China to organize meetings and expand the network for the New Citizens' Movement, which advocates for the peaceful transition of China from authoritarian to a constitutional government.

When Xi Jinping became the paramount leader in China in 2012 and a 205-member Communist Party Central Committee was elected, Ding began organizing demonstrations in Beijing and other cities, calling on the officials to disclose their assets—a move made in the context of wide-spread corruption in China and perceived as a challenge to the Communist Party.

== Activism, arrests, and imprisonment ==
Xu Zhiyong (left) and Ding Jiaxi (right) in an undated photo

=== First imprisonment (2013—2016) ===
On April 17, 2013, Ding was detained by authorities of the Beijing Municipal Public Security Bureau. The authorities searched his home, office, and car. Upon learning of Ding's detention, some petitioners at Beijing South Railway Station staged a protest holding banners.

Beijing human rights lawyer Liu Weiguo speculated that the reason behind Ding's detention was his public letter on December 9, 2012, calling on public officials to lead the way in disclosing their assets, which gathered more than 7,000 signatures from citizens, as well as Ding's advocacy for equal education rights.

According to a communication submitted to the United Nations Working Group on Arbitrary Detention, the reasons for his detention were: "'Gathering a crowd to disrupt order of a public place' through 'holding banners calling for disclosure of Chinese officials' financial assets,' and 'inciting and organizing hundreds of people to appeal for equal access to education in front of the Ministry of Education building.'".

On May 21, 2013, public security authorities changed the charge against Ding from "illegal gathering" to "picking quarrels and provoking trouble" and submitted the case to the procuratorate. On November 4, 2013, the First Branch of the Beijing Municipal People's Procuratorate returned the case to the Public Security Bureau for supplementary investigation, and the charge was altered to "gathering a crowd to disturb social order."

==== Trial (April 2014) ====
Ding's trial proceedings began on 27 January 2014 in the Haidian District People’s Court in Beijing, together with other defendants who had undertaken the same New Citizen Movements' activities as Ding. The other co-defendants were Li Wei, Zhang Baocheng, and Yuan Dong.

According to the defendants' lawyers, procedural violations had occurred during trial, including what one of Ding's lawyers, Wang Xing, described as the inability to review evidence in detail. Ding's other lawyer, Cheng Hai, refused to speak during trial as a form of protest and walked out the courtroom.

The same day Ding, Li, and Zhang announced the termination of their legal representations by their lawyers, forcing an abrupt end to their trial proceedings. Ding's lawyer, Wang, said that the move successfully obstructed the State's plan to end the trials before Chinese New Year—an attempt Wang said to diminish the public's concern for the trial. The sole defendant who did not terminate his legal representation, Yuan, was sentenced on 29, January, 2014, two days after court hearings began.

Trial resumed on 8 April 2014 after a new lawyer, Sui Muqing, represented Ding. Sui also alleged to have been obstructed in evidence review, namely, that he was not given original copies of evidence against Ding and given photocopies instead. According to a submission to the United Nations Working Group on Arbitrary Detention published on the Chinese Human Rights Defenders website, Sui was allegedly assaulted by police during court recess after Sui gave a media interview. On 9 April 2014, Sui walked out the courtroom in protest.

In April 2014, Ding was sentenced to three years and six months in prison. In July 2014, Ding's appeal was rejected by the Beijing First Intermediate People’s Court.

After trial proceedings concluded, Ding's lawyer, Cheng, who had resigned during Ding's trial and walked out the courtroom in protest, was given a one-year suspension; Ding's second lawyer, Sui, was told he would be given a half-year suspension at a minimum.

Ding was held in Beijing No. 2 Prison and released in October 2016.

=== Second arrest and imprisonment (2019—present) ===
In a cross-provincial operation on December 26, 2019, Police arrested Ding in Beijing and placed him under incommunicado detention. The same operation also arrested other human rights activists, including Dai Zhenya in Xiamen, Fujian, Li Yingjun in Zhangzhou, Fujian, and Zhang Zhongshun in Yantai, Shandong, who had together participated in two days of meetings in Xiamen, involving some 20 lawyers and activists. According to those familiar with their meetings' agenda, topics discussed include the Hong Kong democracy protests, the U.S.-China trade war, and human rights.

In February 2020, Xu Zhiyong, another participant of the Xiamen meetings, was also arrested by police.

According to accounts from Ding's lawyer, Peng Jian, Ding's detention took place in the form of Residential Surveillance at a Designated Location (RSDL). While in RSDL, Ding was subjected to various forms of torture, including being strapped tightly to the "tiger bench", causing difficulty in breathing. While strapped to the tiger bench, Ding was interrogated 21 hours a day by four teams of eight interrogators each, who questioned Ding in shifts. From three hours (6—9 am) each day, Ding was allowed to use the toilet and walk around in his cell, though interrogators did not allow him to sleep.

On the seventh day of "tiger bench" interrogations, Ding told his interrogators that he would make certain admissions upon conditions that he would only talk about the Xiamen meeting, that he would not confess to crimes, that he would refuse government-appointed lawyer representation, and that he be allowed to sleep.

In filings at court, Ding's lawyer requested that Ding's admissions be excluded as they were extracted through torture,

In June 2022, Ding and Xu Zhiyong were given prison sentences for "subversion of state power" for 14 and 12 years, respectively, after a closed-door trial in June 2022. The convictions were described as farcical by Human Rights Watch.

In 2024, Freedom House reported that Ding's communication with family members have been restricted to letters. Prison authorities told Ding's wife to "forget about it, Ding will never be allowed a phone call with you."

== International response ==
Before Ding's conviction, on 18 March 2022 ahead of the EU–China summit, NGOs including Human Rights Watch, World Uyghur Congress, and Front Line Defenders sent a joint letter to the Presidents of the European Commission and European Council, urging the EU and its member states to, among other things, publicly call for the release of detained human rights defenders in China, including Ding.

The United Nations High Commissioner for Human Rights Volker Türk stated in April 2023 that "I am very concerned that two prominent human rights defenders in China – Ding Jiaxi and Xu Zhiyong – have been sentenced to lengthy prison terms, at variance with international human rights law standards."

== Awards ==
=== 2023 Global Human Rights Defender Award, Department of State ===
While in prison, Ding was announced recipient of the Department of State's 2023 Global Human Rights Defender Award. His wife, Sophie Luo, received the award on his behalf.

=== 2023 Human Rights Awards, Council of Bars and Law Societies of Europe (CCBE) ===
Ding, along with Xu and human rights lawyer Chow Hang-tung, received the Council of Bars and Law Societies of Europe (CCBE) Human Rights Award 2023 for their "courage, determination and commitment to defending human rights and the rule of law in China". CCBE President Panagiotis Perakis stated that "European lawyers will continue to closely monitor the situation and support their Chinese colleagues who need help. We will never accept that lawyers are targeted because of their legitimate activities as lawyers."

=== Nobel Peace Prize nomination ===
Ding was nominated for the Nobel Peace Prize in 2024 by chairs of the Congressional-Executive Commission on China Christopher Smith and Jeff Merkley, commending on Ding's "deep commitment to human rights and peace in China".

== Personal life ==
Ding is married to engineer and human rights activist Sophie Luo (Luo Shengchun), and the couple have two daughters.

== See also ==
- Xu Zhiyong
- Weiquan movement
- New Citizens' Movement (China)
