= Bob Fu =

Chinese American pastor (born 1968)

- Fu Xiqiu 傅希秋
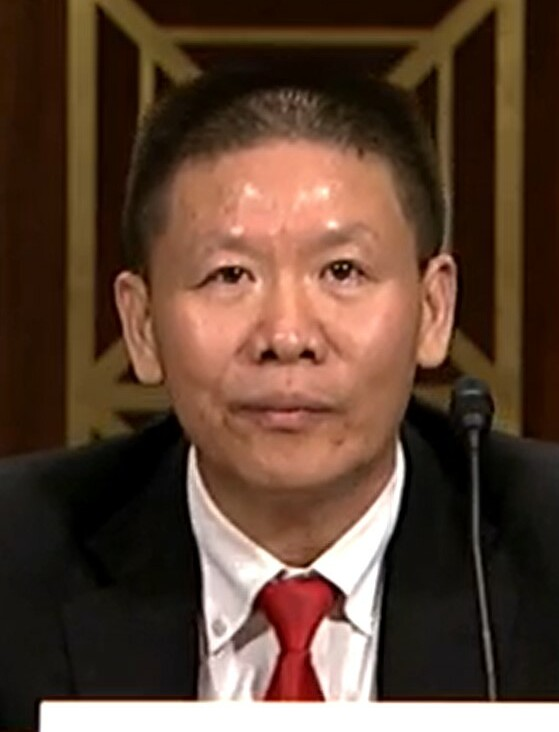
- Fu in 2018
- Born: 1968 (age 57–58); Gaomi, Shandong, China
- Education: Liaocheng University; Westminster Theological Seminary
- Occupations: Pastor, activist
- Spouse: Heidi Fu (Bochun Cai)
- Children: 3

Bob Fu
- Chinese: 傅希秋
Transcriptions
Standard Mandarin
- Hanyu Pinyin: Fù Xīqiū
- Wade–Giles: Fu4 Hsih1-ch'iu1
- IPA: [fû ɕítɕʰjóʊ]

Bob Fu (Chinese: 傅希秋; pinyin: Fù Xīqiū) is a Chinese-American pastor. In 2002, he founded ChinaAid, which provides legal aid to Christians in China, and has been its president since then. Bob Fu was born in Shandong in 1968 and studied English literature at Liaocheng University in the 1980s. He converted to Christianity after an American teacher gave him a biography of a Chinese Christian convert. After his studies, Fu taught English at the Central Party School of the Chinese Communist Party in Beijing while participating in the house church movement. In 1996, Bob Fu and his family emigrated to Hong Kong and then the United States, after his wife became pregnant without government permission to have a child. Fu founded the China Aid Association in Philadelphia in 2002, but moved its headquarters to Midland, Texas, in 2004. Fu is also known for his role in helping negotiate barefoot lawyer Chen Guangcheng's immigration to the United States. In this sense, he has been described as a "liaison" between oppressed groups in China and foreign governments or media that can help them.

== Biography ==
=== Early life and education ===
Fu Xiqiu was born in 1968 in Shandong province and started studying English literature at Liaocheng University in 1987. During his time at university, Fu engaged in political activism and started the process of joining the Chinese Communist Party, with the intention of becoming a government official. His American professors would preach to students from a pocket bible after class. Fu organized a group of students from his university to participate in the Tiananmen Square protests of 1989 in Beijing. When he returned to Shandong, he was investigated but not detained, and ultimately decided not to join the Party. That year, an American English teacher gave him a biography of Xi Shengmo, a 19th-century Chinese Christian convert. After reading the book, Fu decided to convert to Christianity as well.

After completing his studies, Fu taught English at the Central Party School of the Chinese Communist Party in Beijing while his wife Bochun Cai (b. 1966) studied at the Renmin University of China. The couple evangelized widely, starting a campus church and secret bible school in Fangshan District, Beijing. On May 9, 1996, the couple was reportedly detained for running a Christian training center in Fangshan District, Beijing, under a business license and for illegal evangelizing. On July 8, they left detention after having been beaten, starved, mistreated, and witnessed horribly cruel treatment of other prisoners, and were warned not to engage with foreigners. They were put under house arrest. Authorities said that Fu could keep his job and stay in the dormitory at the Communist Party school, and would not have to pay any fines, but he was subsequently fired and his wife was not able to graduate, although she was weeks away from being able to.

=== Emigration and activism ===
That same year, Fu's wife became pregnant, in violation of the one-child policy. Rather than face the penalty, they emigrated to the then-British colony of Hong Kong, where Cai gave birth to Daniel Fu (Chinese: 傅博恩; pinyin: Fù Bó'ēn). The National Association of Evangelicals successfully lobbied the Clinton White House to get Fu political asylum in the United States, where he immigrated in 1997, settling in Philadelphia and attending nearby Westminster Theological Seminary. In July 1998, Fu and Cai moved to neighboring Glenside, Pennsylvania, to live with another Chinese family in a house purchased by an anonymous donor. They adopted the names "Bob" and "Heidi" at this time.

Fu founded the evangelical China Aid Association in 2002 in response to a crackdown on the Hubei-based unauthorized "South China Church" (Chinese: 华南教会; pinyin: Huánán Jiàohuì). He and other Christians raised enough money for 58 lawyers for the defense, seeding prominent stories about the trial in The New York Times and The Wall Street Journal. The legal charge of "undermining enforcement of the law" was dropped due to insufficient evidence. China Aid enlists thousands of volunteers in China who are available to carry out activities called on by Fu through the internet, telephone, and letters. It also pays the salaries of 30 defense lawyers.

Fu has also taught at Oklahoma Wesleyan University.

=== Midland operations ===
After being invited to visit Midland, Texas, by a fellow pastor, he moved his operations there in 2004. According to The New York Times, Fu maintains "close association with Republicans and evangelical Christians". He has prayed in English in American churches, and has cultivated contacts in evangelical groups in Texas. In 2008, Fu arranged for Republican House representative Frank Wolf to meet with an unauthorized house church leader in China. In 2009, Fu persuaded the Bush National Security Council and State Department to grant asylum to the family of Gao Zhisheng, a lawyer known for his defense of house Christians and other sensitive groups.

In May 2012, Fu translated legal activist Chen Guangcheng's appeal to travel to the US in a special congressional hearing convened by representative Chris Smith (R-NJ). Fu criticized President Barack Obama for "abandoning" Chen for his handling of the case.

In America, New York University (NYU) technicians mistakenly announced that they had found spyware installed on an iPad and iPhone that Fu had given to Chen via his wife Heidi Cai. Jerome A. Cohen of NYU accused Fu of giving Chen a trojan horse "enabl[ing Fu] to monitor his communications secretly", although Fu denied this, saying his technicians only installed Skype for Chen. Cohen and NYU later rescinded these accusations, which they said were based on a misunderstanding of the technology, and clarified that the iPad and iPhone given to Mr. Chen by China Aid did not contain spyware.

On July 13, 2021, Bob Fu, founder and president of ChinaAid, testified at a hearing on the "Global State of Religious Freedom" held by the Tom Lantos Human Rights Commission of the U.S. Congress. During his testimony, he cited several "key cases," including those of Gao Zhisheng and Wang Zhan, to illustrate the political oppression and religious persecution taking place in China.
