= Qiaochu =

Qiaochu (翹楚) may refer to:

- Ashes to Crown, a 2026 Chinese television series starring Chen Duling and Zhou Yiran

== People ==
- Li Qiaochu (born 1991), a Chinese activist and researcher
- Qin Qiaochu, a fictional character portrayed by Jiao Junyan in Perfect Evidence
- Zhang Qiaochu (born 2008), a Chinese bicycle racing cyclist for the third prize in Junior Mixed Team Time Trial Race, 2026 in women's road cycling#Continental championships
