= Hebei Subdistrict, Gongzhuling =

Hebei Subdistrict 河北街道
- Subdistrict
- Location in Jilin
- Coordinates: 43°30′12″N 124°48′21″E
- Country: People's Republic of China
- Province: Jilin
- Prefecture-level city: Changchun
- County-level city: Gongzhuling
- Time zone: UTC+8 (China Standard)

Hebei Subdistrict (Chinese: 河北街道; pinyin: Héběi Jiēdào) is a subdistrict in Gongzhuling, Jilin province, China. As of 2020, it has four residential communities under its administration:

- Jinghua Community (京华社区)
- Chaoyang Community (朝阳社区)
- Xinfa Community (新发社区)
- Nongchang Community (农场社区)

== See also ==
- List of township-level divisions of Jilin
