= New Citizens' Movement =

Chinese civil rights activist group

- Part of Weiquan Movement
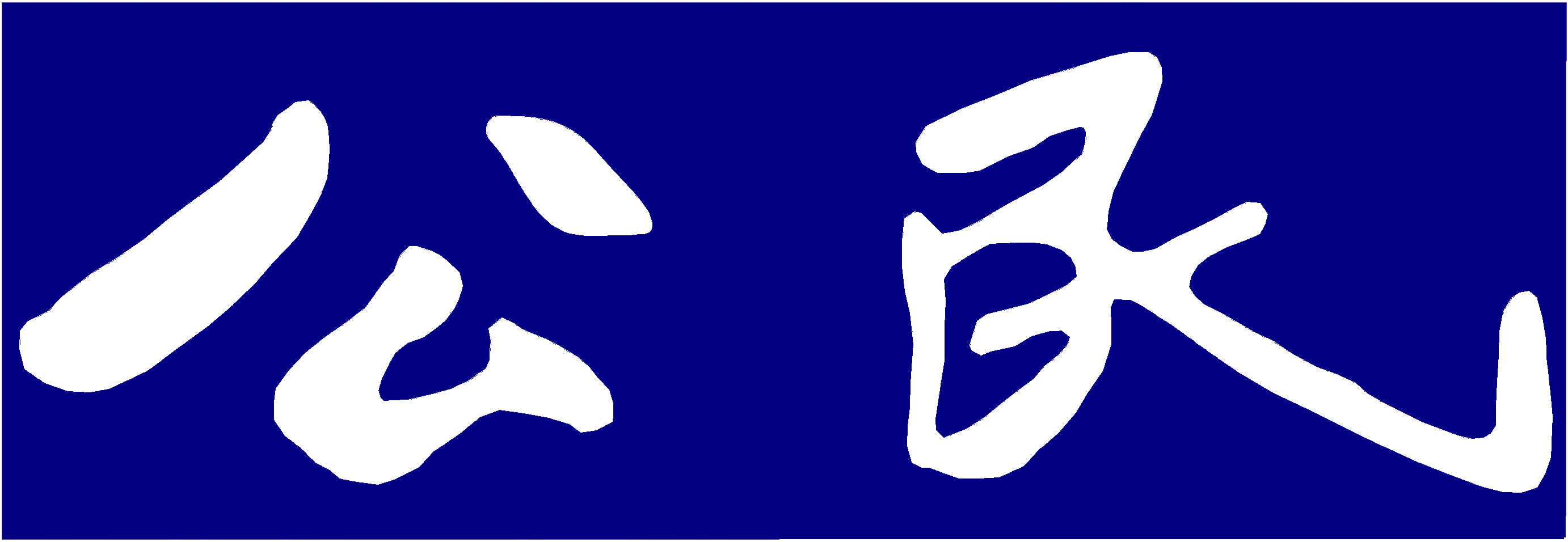
- Gongmin insignia, handwriting of Sun Yatsen
- Date: 2010
- Location: Beijing, China
- Goals: Peaceful transition to constitutionalism; Greater civic rights; Disclosure of official assets; Equal rights for education
- Methods: Peaceful activism, education to increase public awareness
- Result: Arrests by Chinese government security agents; Heavy sentences dispensed to activists

Lead figures
Xu Zhiyong; Wang Gongquan	Chinese Communist Party, Ministry of Public Security

Arrest/Detentions
- Arrested: 4-5

The Chinese New Citizens' Movement (simplified Chinese: 中国新公民运动; traditional Chinese: 中國新公民運動; pinyin: Zhōngguó xīn gōngmín yùndòng) is a collection of numerous civil rights activists in mainland China since 2010. It is promoted by the loosely organized civil rights group "Citizens" (successor to the Open Constitution Initiative (Chinese: 公盟; pinyin: gōngméng)) with the New Citizens' Spirit: "Free, Righteous, Loving". It is a major component of the civil society movement in mainland China since the beginning of the 21st century. The New Citizen's Movement has close ties to the weiquan movement (rights defending movement), but it has clearer and higher-level charter and pursuits. It is a political movement, which hopes to facilitate a peaceful transition of the country towards constitutionalism. It is also a social movement, hoping to facilitate a transition from a "servants' society" to a civil society.

The name "New Citizens' Movement" was proposed by Xu Zhiyong, a prominent legal scholar and civil rights lawyer, in his article "China's New Citizens' Movement" in May 2012.

New Citizens' Movement
- Traditional Chinese: 新公民運動
- Simplified Chinese: 新公民运动
- Literal meaning: New Citizen's Movement
Transcriptions
Standard Mandarin
- Hanyu Pinyin: XīnGōngMín Yùndòng

Chinese authorities have always tried to monitor and suppress the New Citizens' Movement. Xu Zhiyong, founder of the movement, was arrested on July 16, 2013. Another prominent businessman and financial supporter of the movement, Wang Gongquan, was arrested on September 13, 2013.

== New Citizens' spirit and logo ==
=== New Citizens' Spirit ===
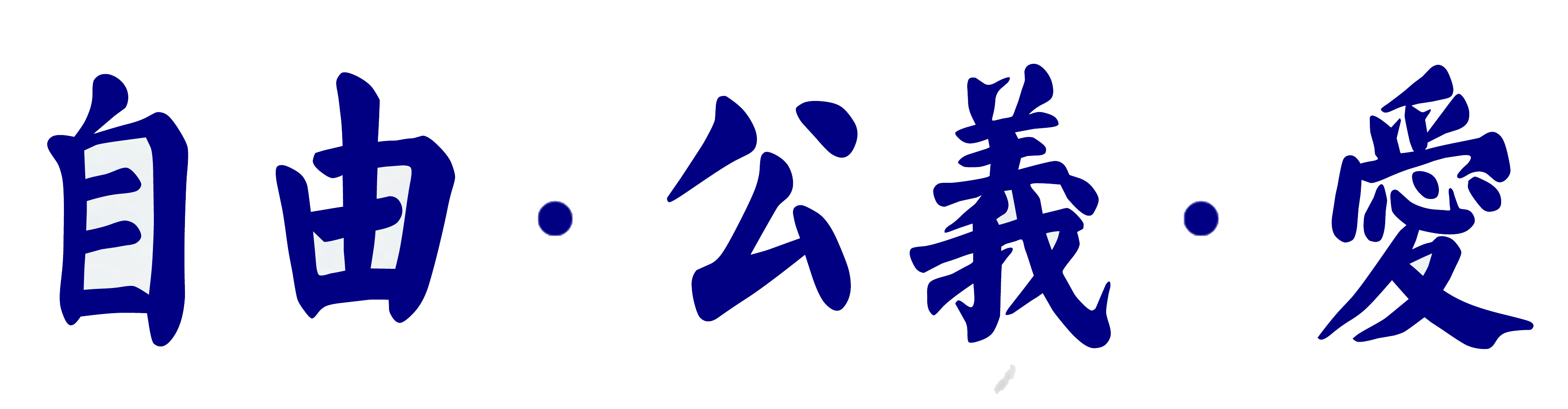
The "Free, Righteous, Loving" insignia

The New Citizens' Spirit was first established by Xu Zhiyong in his article "New Citizens' Spirit - Free, Righteous, Loving".

=== New Citizens' logo ===
The New Citizens' logo is the word "公民" (citizen) handwritten by Sun Yat-sen. The characters are in white on a blue background. It is the common symbol of Chinese citizens' pursuit of freedom, democracy, rule of law and constitutionalism. It is often used in combination with the five Chinese characters denoting the New Citizens' Spirit.

== Activism of the New Citizens' movement ==
=== Citizens' pledge ===
In June 2010, a group of scholars, lawyers, journalists and activists, including Xu Zhiyong, Teng Biao, Wang Gongquan, Li Xiongbin, Li Fangping, Xu Youyu and Zhang Shihe (Laohumiao), initiated an open letter "The Citizens' Pledge", calling for the awakening and improvement of Chinese citizens' civil rights awareness. This event is usually regarded as the start of the New Citizens' Movement (even though it was prior to the coinage of the term).

=== Equal rights for education ===
"Equal Rights for Education" is armed to reduce and eliminate the huge unfairness of the distribution of education resources in mainland China. One specific campaign is to abolish the hukou restriction in gaokao (college admission exam) for migrants' children in large cities. The campaign started with just four student-parent volunteers in 2010, and grew to more than 100,000 in 2012. Under the pressure, the Ministry of Education revised the gaokao policy for migrants' student children in August 2012. Subsequently, all provinces and cities except Beijing and Shanghai, removed or promised to remove the hukou constraint. This campaign was initiated by Wang Gongquan.

=== Wealth disclosure (of government officials) ===
"Wealth Disclosure" calls for the disclosure of the wealth of government officials in mainland China. There have been public demonstrations in many cities. The notable ones include a demonstration by Yuan Dong, Zhang Baocheng, Ma Xinli and Hou Xin in Beijing's Xidan Square on March 31, 2013, and a demonstration by Liu Ping, Wei Zhongping, Li Sihua etc. in Xinyu, Jiangxi on April 23, 2013.

=== Same-city dinner gathering ===
"Same-City Dining" is the regular dinner gathering held on the last Saturday each month. In mainland China, netizens' dinner gathering has been around for many years. Around the end of 2011, after deliberations, it was proposed to set a fixed date (last Saturday of the month) so as to strengthen the coalitions of citizens. The dinner gatherings are self-organized, generally covering social issues, but the topic and format are not fixed. At 2013, the dinner gatherings take place in more than 30 cities, including overseas Chinese. Even though dinner gatherings are low-key and not illegal, they are still under pressure in several cities like Beijing, Shanghai, Zhengzhou, Nanning and Changsha. The participants may be questioned, and sensitive persons are sometimes threatened or detained.

=== Citizen Lookout ===
"Citizen Lookout" is a project to provide support for the basic needs of families of prisoners of conscience. The reference level is RMB 50,000 per year. This project was proposed by Li Huaping. It is similar to the "Songfandang" by Routangseng and "Ai-Mo-Can-Help" project by Ai Weiwei and Mo Zhixu.

== Reaction of Chinese authorities ==
Chinese authorities have frequently suppressed independent activism. In 2009, authorities disbanded Gongmeng (Open Constitution Initiative) alleging tax evasion. Many Gongmeng members subsequently joined "Citizens" to continue civil rights activism.

From the end of 2012 to 2013, many citizens took to the streets in Shenzhen, Beijing, Jiangxi and other cities, demanding that Chinese government officials disclose their wealth, which led to several arrests. Between March 31 and April 17, 2013, authorities arrested 10 citizens: Yuan Dong, Zhang Baocheng, Ma Xinli, Hou Xin, Ding Jiaxi, Zhao Changqing, Sun Hanhui, Wang Yonghong, Li Wei and Qi Yueying. Also arrested in Beijing were Zhang Xiangzhong, Li Gang, Li Huanjun, Song Ze and Xu Zhiyong. Three Xinyu citizens, Liu Ping, Wei Zhongping, Li Sihua were arrested in Jiangxi on April 28, 2013. Five citizens, Yuan Fengchu (Yuan Bing), Yuan Xiaohua, Huang Wenxun, Chen Jianxiong (Chen Jinxin), and Li Yinli were arrested in Hubei on May 25.

The trial of Liu Ping, Wei Zhongping and Li Sihua began in late 2013. They had been in detention since April. The three were indicted on a charge of illegal assembly in July, with additional charges of "gathering a crowd to disrupt order in a public place" and "using an evil cult to undermine law enforcement" given to Liu Ping and Wei Zhongping in September.

On July 16, 2013, after being under house arrest for more than three months, Xu Zhiyong was detained for allegedly "amassing a crowd to disturb order in a public space". The arrest was covered in the news and drew great attention both domestically and internationally. On August 22, Dr Xu was formally charged.

On July 18, Chuan-Zhi-Xing ("Transitions"), a Beijing-based NGO/thinktank was closed due to its involvement with civil rights research.

Dr Xu's arrest caused wide-scale protest. Mao Yushi, Wang Gongquan, Xiaoshu, He Sanwei, Yang Zili published an open letter demanding the release of Dr Xu and other arrested citizens. More than 3000 people signed the open letter.

On August 8, Guo Feixiong, a main organizer of New Citizens' Movement in southern China, was arrested. On August 11, Li Huaping, a main organizer of New Citizens' Movement in eastern China, was arrested.

On September 13, Wang Gongquan was detained by Beijing police for "disturbing order in public space". On October 20, he was formally charged.

On January 26, 2014, the Beijing Number One Intermediate People's Court sentenced Xu Zhiyong to a four-year prison sentence. The conviction was for assembling crowds with the intent to disrupt public spaces.

In April 2014, Ding Jiaxi and Li Wei were put on trial for 'disrupting public order'. Foreign diplomats attended, but were not admitted to the hearing.
