= Liu Ping (activist) =

- 刘萍
- Born: December 2, 1964 (age 61); Xinyu City, Jiangxi Province
- Known for: Civil rights activism

Liu Ping (simplified Chinese: 刘萍; traditional Chinese: 劉萍; pinyin: Liú Píng, born December 2, 1964) is a female grassroot civil rights activist in China. As a retired factory employee of Xinyu Iron and Steel Group, she attracted widespread attention for independently running for a local delegate to the National People's Congress in 2011. In 2013, Liu Ping was arrested for publicly demanding Chinese officials to disclose their wealth and was the first to be tried among the arrested activists in the New Citizens' Movement in China. She was sentenced to 6 1/2 years in prison in June 2014.

== Biography ==
Liu was born in Xinyu, Jiangxi in 1964. She worked at Yuanxingang Equipment and Materials Co., a branch of Xinyu Iron and Steel Group until her xiagang (being forced to retire) in 2009. Since retirement, Liu started activism to increase the compensation for her colleagues who were similarly forced to retire. She went to petition to the central government in Beijing for three times and was detained for 10 days in 2010.

In April 2011, Liu Ping decided to run for the local delegate to the National People's Congress. As soon as Liu announced her candidacy, local government started to harass her and her supporters. The authority deemed her action as being backed by "anti-China forces" and posing a grim threat to China's established election procedures. Even though Liu obtained enough supporters to show up on the ballot by Chinese election laws, she was declared ineligible by Yang Jianyun, director of the local election office.

Liu Ping's attempt received widespread support in China, e.g. the prominent scholar Yu Jianrong. It also unleashed a wave of candidacies in China later that year. Along with Liu, another Xinyu resident, Wei Zhongping, also attempted to run in the race. He was also declared ineligible by the authority. More than 100 people announced campaigns online, including celebrities like Li Chengpeng, but a much smaller number of people actually ran. Chinese authority took it very seriously and made sure not the name of a single independent candidate appeared on any ballot. Xu Zhiyong, a prominent legal scholar and activist, who had succeeded in running independently twice in the past, did not succeed later that year.

Liu Ping participated in several high profile campaigns since the failed running attempt. In 2011, Liu organized a group of citizens to visit the blind lawyer Chen Guangcheng, who was under house arrest and tight guarding in Linyi, Shandong. Liu also went to Wukan Village to support the villagers during the Wukan protests.

In 2013, many Chinese citizens took to the street demanding Chinese officials to disclose their wealth. On April 23, 2013, Liu Ping, Wei Zhongping and Li Sihua organized a demonstration in Xinyu. Liu was arrested on April 27, and Wei and Li were arrested soon after. The detainment was originally on the ground for "inciting subversion of state power". This charge was changed to three charges soon after: illegal assembly, assembling a crowd to disrupt public order, and using a cult organization to undermine the law. The trial took place on October 28, 2013, and many of her supporters and witnesses were harassed or detained.

In June 2014 she was sentenced to 6 1/2 years in prison by a court in the province of Jiangxi for using a cult to damage law enforcement, gathering a mob to disturb order in public places, and picking quarrels and provoking trouble.

== See also ==
- Weiquan movement
- New Citizens' Movement (China)
