= Nanfu Battery =

Chinese battery company

- Native name: 福建南平南孚有限公司
- Industry: primary battery;secondary battery
- Founded: 1988; 38 years ago
- Headquarters: Nanping, China
- Area served: Worldwide
- Products: alkaline battery, lithium rechargeable battery
- Website: nanfu.com

Nanfu Battery (Chinese: 南孚电池), full name Fujian Nanping Nanfu Battery, Co., Ltd., is a Chinese alkaline battery manufacturer and supplier. Nanfu Battery is headquartered in Nanping, Fujian province, China. Nanfu Battery holds the number one position in China's alkaline battery market with over eighty percent of the country's market share.

Nanfu Battery products are also available for the American market via online sales platforms such as eBay and Amazon.

== History ==
Fujian Nanping Nanfu Battery, Co., Ltd. was founded in 1988. The company owns over three million retail outlets in China. In August 2003, Gillette acquired a seventy-two percent stake in the company. Procter & Gamble (P&G) purchased Gillette in 2005 along with Gillette's stake in Nanfu Battery. CDH Investments then purchased P&G's 78.8 percent equity stake in Nanfu Battery in November 2014.

== Products ==
The company's major products are alkaline battery products, including AA, AAA, D, C, and 9V batteries. The company also produces lithium batteries.
