= Yangdachengzi =

Town in Changchun, Jilin, China

Coordinates: 43°56′24″N 124°25′58″E

Yangdachengzi (simplified Chinese: 杨大城子; traditional Chinese: 楊大城子; pinyin: Yángdàchéngzǐ) is a town in western Jilin province of Northeast China. It is under the administration of Gongzhuling and is more than 70 kilometres (43 mi) west of Changchun, the provincial capital.

Yangdachengzi is on the common border of three county-level divisions, which are Gongzhuling, Shuangliao and Changling County. The town has a total area of 251 square kilometres (97 sq mi), with a town district area of 4 square kilometres (1.5 sq mi). As of 2008, it had a total population of 53,000, while the number of town district residents is 12,000.

== History ==
According to the county annals of Huaide, the town began to form at about 300 years ago during the early Qing dynasty, and it has the longest commercial history in west area of Jilin province. Yangdachengzi began to build its city wall when Guangxu emperor was on his throne. After that, it became the county town of Huaide during the civil war from 1946 to 1949. It was the taoism center of west Jilin in Chiang Kai-shek-administrative period. The Foguang temple located in Yangdachengzi is one of the biggest buddhist temples in the area of Siping prefecture-level city.

== Administration ==
The administrative structure of Yangdachengzi contains 1 subdistrict office and 21 villages:

- Yangchengzi (杨城子村)
- Wuxing (五星村)
- Heigangzi (黑岗子村)
- Kaoshan (靠山村)
- Pingan (平安村)
- Fengxiang (凤翔村)
- Xinxing (新兴村)
- Shengli (胜利村)
- Laofangshen (老房身村)
- Xiataizi (下台子村)
- Wangjiayao (王家窑村)
- Jianguo (碱锅村)
- Baoquan (宝泉村)
- Wudatun (吴大屯村)
- Wangzapu (王杂堡村)
- Bazibao (筢子堡村)
- Fujugong (福巨公村)
- Gongbeigou (公北沟村)
- Guanjiagou (管家沟村)
- Jinpen (金盆村)
- Changshan (长山村)
