= Liaocheng University =

University in Shandong, China

- 聊城大学
- Motto: 敬业, 博学, 求实, 创新
- Type: Public
- Established: 1974
- President: Ma Chunlin (马春林)
- Academic staff: 2,150
- Students: 29,000
- Location: Liaocheng, Shandong, China
- Campus: Urban 840,000 m^{2}
- Website: http://www.lcu.edu.cn

Liaocheng University (Chinese: 聊城大学; pinyin: Liáochéng dàxué) is a comprehensive university located in Liaocheng City, Shandong Province, China.

== History ==
The university was established in 1974 as Shandong Teachers College (Liaocheng Branch). In 1981, the Liaocheng Branch was renamed to Liaocheng Teachers College. In 2002, after approval of the Ministry of Education, the university adopted its present name, Liaocheng University.

== Administration ==
Liaocheng University currently comprises 23 colleges, offering 26 first-level disciplines authorized to confer master's degrees, 21 categories of professional master's degree programs, and 74 undergraduate majors. Its academic programs span 13 major disciplinary fields, including philosophy, economics, law, education, literature, history, science, engineering, agriculture, management, arts, medicine, and interdisciplinary studies. The university is composed of the following faculties.

=== Faculty structure ===
- School of Chemistry and Chemical Engineering
- School of Literature
- School of Politics and Law
- School of Business
- School of History and Culture
- School of Foreign Languages
- School of Mathematics Science
- School of Physics Science and Information Engineering
- School of Education Science
- School of Physical Education
- School of Art
- School of Management
- School of Materials Science and Engineering
- School of Life Science
- School of Educational Technology and Mass Medium
- School of Environment and Planning
- School of Computer Science
- School of Agricultural Science
- School of Automobile and Transportation Engineering
- Dongchang College
- School of International Education
- College of Continual Education

== Research Center for Pacific Island Countries ==
The Research Center for Pacific Island Countries (RCPIC) at Liaocheng University, established in September 2012, is the first independent institution in mainland China dedicated to the study of Pacific Island countries. In March 2021, it was designated by the Ministry of Education of the People's Republic of China as one of the 48 key national institutes for area and country studies.

RCPIC is widely regarded as the leading academic body for Pacific Island studies in mainland China. According to data from the China National Knowledge Infrastructure (CNKI), more than 70 percent of scholarly publications on Pacific Island countries in mainland China originate from this center. The center is also responsible for authoring major reference works, including the entry on Pacific Island countries in the third edition of the Chinese Encyclopedia, several volumes of the Series of National Conditions (Lieguozhi), and the annually published Blue Book of Pacific Island Countries.
