= Li Qiaochu =

Chinese labor and women's rights activist

- 李翘楚
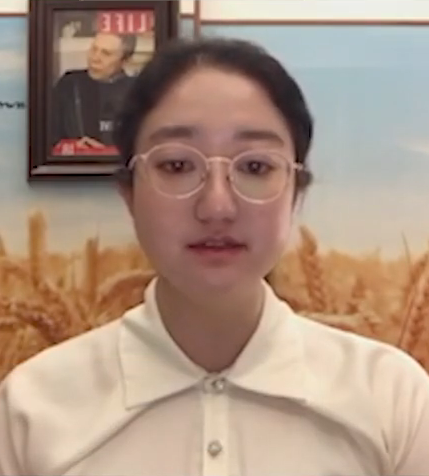
- Li in December 2020
- Born: 13 January 1991 (age 35); Beijing
- Education: Renmin University; University of York
- Known for: Civil rights advocacy

Li Qiaochu (Chinese: 李翘楚; pinyin: Lǐ Qiáochǔ; born 13 January 1991 in Beijing) is a Chinese labor and women's rights activist and researcher on labour issues. She was detained by authorities for four months in the first half of 2020 and again in February 2021, in both cases on national security charges. These were due to her connection with activists, including her partner Xu Zhiyong, who had secretly met in the southeastern city of Xiamen in December 2019 to discuss "democratic transition in China". In February 2024, Li was sentenced to three years and eight months in prison for "inciting subversion of state power". She was released in August 2024 after having completed her sentence.

== Education and career ==
After completing her undergraduate studies at Renmin University, Li obtained a master's degree in public policy from the University of York in 2015. Later she worked as a research assistant at Tsinghua University, where her work included an analysis of China's pension system and research on the rights of migrant workers.

== Activism ==
In 2017, Li worked with other volunteers on finding free or cheap housing for thousands of migrant workers who had been evicted by authorities in Beijing during a particularly cold winter. In 2018, she compiled data on cases of sexual harassment and drafted reports in support of the Me Too movement in China. She also took part in efforts against the 996 working hour system.

On 24 January 2020, Li criticized in a Twitter message on occasion of the Lunar New Year the alleged underreporting of the number of deaths by the Chinese authorities in the early stages of the COVID-19 pandemic, calling to "remember the pain [and] the lives that left us without even being tallied", and writing: "Let’s use civic engagement to pursue those responsible for trampling lives." She joined a volunteer team to distribute free masks to sanitation workers, and helped pregnant women in quarantine areas to obtain medical care. She also worked to support victims of domestic violence, which spiked in the wake of pandemic lockdowns in central China.

In early 2020, Li publicized an essay by her partner, legal activist and former university lecturer Xu Zhiyong, which called on Chinese leader Xi Jinping to resign over alleged incompetence in particular with regard to his handling of the COVID-19 outbreak.

== Four-month detention and 2021 arrest ==
On 31 December 2019, Li was held for 24 hours, while being handcuffed, in Haidian District for questioning regarding Xu. Along with other human rights activists, Xu was wanted by police for his participation in a meeting in Xiamen on 13 December 2019 where "democratic transition in China" was discussed. Li had not taken part in the Xiamen meeting. Nevertheless, her arrest was regarded by the non-governmental organization Human Rights in China as part of the "12.26 Citizen Case" named in reference to 26 December, the date of the first arrests in relation to the meeting. Li later posted online about the interrogation, in which she alleged that her depression had been used at one of the questionings to belittle her character; she also wrote that she had been monitored by security guards since her release.

Li was detained in the early morning of 16 February 2020 in Beijing, one day after Xu was detained in Guangzhou. As of 11 March 2020, her charge and whereabouts had not been disclosed by authorities, with an officer saying that Li had been subpoenaed for "allegedly inciting subversion of state power". Li's lawyer, Song Yusheng, was denied information about his client on "national security grounds". After having been held incommunicado in RSDL, a form of secret detention, Li was released on bail on 19 June 2020. In an essay about her detention dated 11 January 2021, Li accused state authorities of serious ill-treatment, including that her medication had been denied in the first five days.

In December 2020, Li accepted the PEN America 2020 PEN/Barbey Freedom to Write Award on behalf of Xu, who was still in detention. Subsequently, Li was forced by police into house arrest and, according to PEN America, threatened with detention if she continued to speak about the detention of Xu. On 5 February 2021, after Li visited Xu and activist Ding Jiaxi in prison, she tweeted about them having been tortured during detention, charging that Xu had been "tied to an iron chair for more than ten hours a day" for more than a week in May 2020. On 6 February, police from Linyi County, where Xu was held, took away Li in Beijing. She was formally arrested on 15 March on charges of "inciting subversion of state power" and completed a period of coronavirus quarantine in Linyi, according to close friends. A member of the Weiquan movement said on that day that Li was suffering from depression and had been assigned to a supervised section of a hospital in Linyi, where she was barred from meeting with lawyers. Beijing-based rights activist Hu Jia opined that Li played a key role in the efforts of authorities to cover up their persecution of the dissidents at the 12.26 Citizen Case.

In March 2021, Chinese Human Rights Defenders awarded Li, together with activist Li Yufeng, the 2021 Cao Shunli Memorial Award for Human Rights Defenders.

Li reportedly received a visit by her lawyer on 27 August, during her third stay at the hospital under the supervision of the Linyi Detention Center. This was the first time she had seen a lawyer during her detention; four previous requests had been rejected by authorities on the grounds that they would leak secrets and compromise the investigation. A rights lawyer familiar with the case suspected that Li, who was reportedly suffering from severe tinnitus and had gained substantial weight as side effects of her medication, had "likely been subjected to mild torture" during detention. On 10 September, Li reportedly again met a lawyer, who stated that Li had unsuccessfully applied for bail twice.

In February 2022, prosecutors issued an indictment saying that Li was facing trial for "subversion of state power", alleging that Li had published numerous articles by Xu with the intention to "overthrow the socialist system". By March 2022, several requests by her family for medical parole had been made with authorities but all had been turned down.

On 19 December 2023, a closed-door trial of Li in Linyi ended, according to a supporter group, without a verdict. Her lawyer had not been allowed to attend.

On 5 February 2024, Li was sentenced to three years and eight months in prison for "subversion of state power", and deprived of her political rights for two years. She was released in August 2024 after completing her sentence, which as customary in China included pre-trial detention. That same month, she made a post on social media thanking her supporters, and asking for continued attention to her and Xu Zhiyong.

== See also ==
- List of Chinese pro-democracy activists
