= Gongzhuling =

Gongzhuling 公主岭市
- County-level & Sub-prefectural city
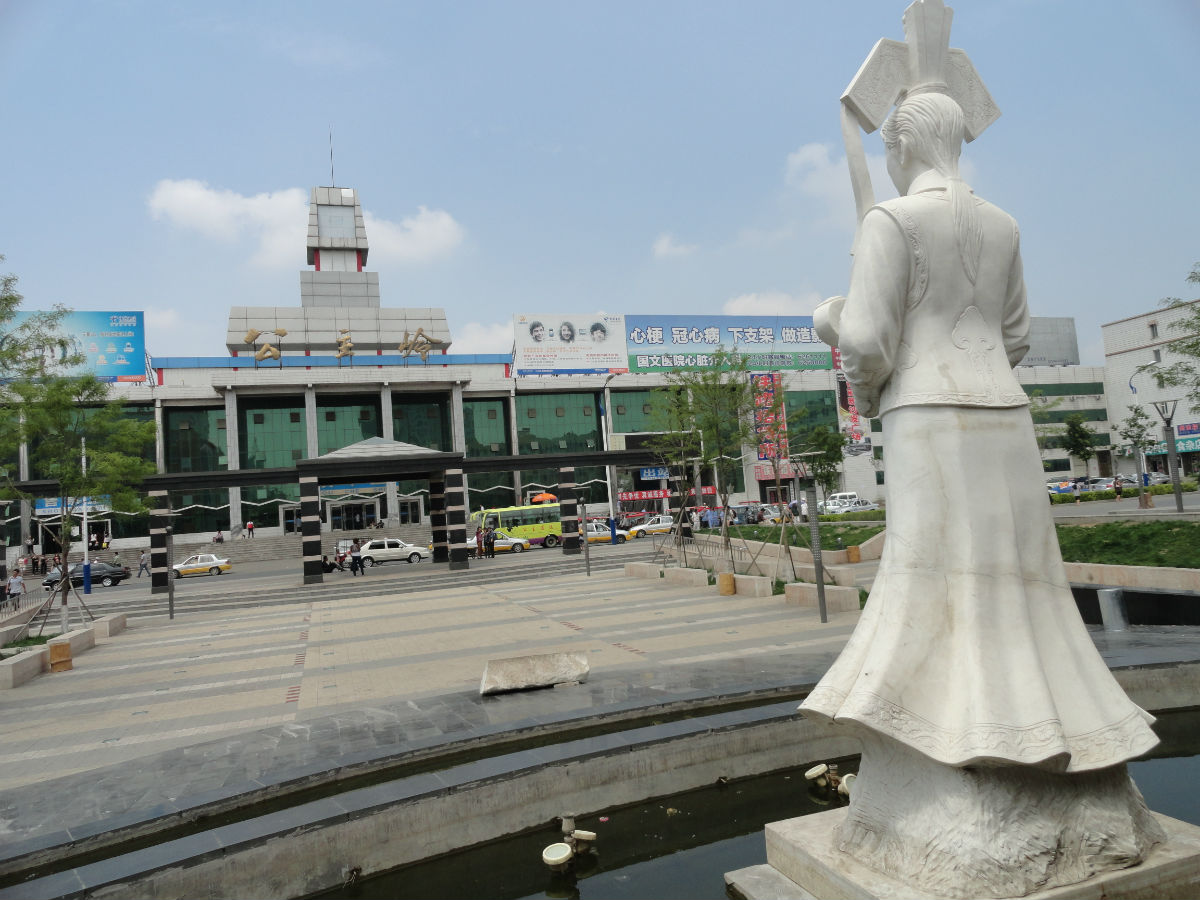

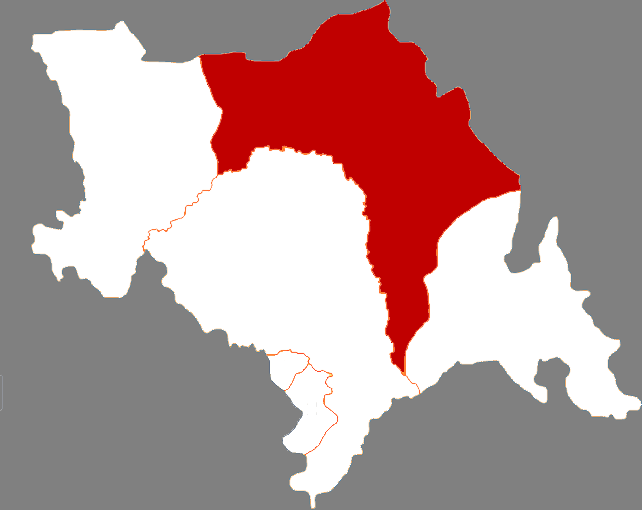

- Location in Jilin province Gongzhuling (China)
- Coordinates (Gongzhuling government): 43°30′19″N 124°49′21″E
- Country: People's Republic of China
- Province: Jilin
- Prefecture-level city: Changchun
- Seat: Dongsan Subdistrict

Area
  - County-level & Sub-prefectural city: 4,172.6 km^{2} (1,611.0 sq mi)
  - Urban: 137.75 km^{2} (53.19 sq mi)
- Elevation: 215 m (705 ft)

Population (2017)
  - County-level & Sub-prefectural city: 1,073,000
  - Density: 257.2/km^{2} (666.0/sq mi)
  - Urban: 180,700
- Time zone: UTC+8 (China Standard)

Gongzhuling (simplified Chinese: 公主岭; traditional Chinese: 公主嶺; pinyin: Gōngzhǔlǐng; lit. 'Princess Ridge') is a county-level city under the administration of Changchun. It is located in central Jilin province of Northeast China, halfway between Siping and Changchun, along the main railway line in the Northeast. Major employers in the city include Jilin Academy of Agricultural Sciences, located on the north side of the railway and several factories which manufacture auto parts. There is major military presence in the area, including a PLA base and a military airport.

== Administrative divisions ==
Subdistricts:

- Dongsan Subdistrict (东三街道), Tiebei Subdistrict (铁北街道), Lingdong Subdistrict (岭东街道), Henan Subdistrict (河南街道), Hebei Subdistrict (河北街道)

Towns:

- Fanjiatun (范家屯镇), Xiangshui (响水镇), Liufangzi (刘房子镇), Heilinzi (黑林子镇), Daling (大岭镇), Huaide (怀德镇), Shuangchengbao (双城堡镇), Qinjiatun (秦家屯镇), Ershijiazi Manchu Ethnic Town (二十家子满族镇), Sangshutai (桑树台镇), Nanwaizi (南崴子镇), Yangdachengzi (杨大城子镇), Bawu (八屋镇), Taojiatun (陶家屯镇), Bolichengzi (玻璃城子镇), Chaoyangpo (朝阳坡镇), Dayushu (大榆树镇), Maochengzi (毛城子镇), Shiwu (十屋镇)

Townships:

- Shuangyushu Township (双榆树乡), Yulin Township (育林乡), Baoquan Township (宝泉乡), Shuanglong (双龙乡), Lianhuashan Township (莲花山乡), Huanling Township (环岭乡), Weizigou Township (苇子沟乡), Liuyang Township (柳杨乡), Yongfa Township (永发乡), Sidaogang Township (四道岗乡), Heqi Township (和气乡), Fengxiang Township (凤响乡), Fangmagou Manchu Ethnic Township (放马沟满族乡)

== Climate ==
Climate data for Gongzhuling, elevation 200 m (660 ft), (1991–2020 normals, extremes 1991–present)
Month	Jan	Feb	Mar	Apr	May	Jun	Jul	Aug	Sep	Oct	Nov	Dec	Year
Record high °C (°F)	4.2 (39.6)	14.5 (58.1)	23.4 (74.1)	31.9 (89.4)	35.7 (96.3)	36.7 (98.1)	35.7 (96.3)	35.4 (95.7)	30.6 (87.1)	28.2 (82.8)	20.7 (69.3)	8.6 (47.5)	36.7 (98.1)
Mean daily maximum °C (°F)	−8.4 (16.9)	−3.1 (26.4)	5.2 (41.4)	15.3 (59.5)	22.5 (72.5)	27.0 (80.6)	28.5 (83.3)	27.3 (81.1)	22.7 (72.9)	14.2 (57.6)	2.8 (37.0)	−6.2 (20.8)	12.3 (54.2)
Daily mean °C (°F)	−14.0 (6.8)	−8.9 (16.0)	−0.5 (31.1)	9.2 (48.6)	16.6 (61.9)	21.7 (71.1)	24.0 (75.2)	22.5 (72.5)	16.7 (62.1)	8.3 (46.9)	−2.3 (27.9)	−11.2 (11.8)	6.8 (44.3)
Mean daily minimum °C (°F)	−18.8 (−1.8)	−14.3 (6.3)	−6.0 (21.2)	3.2 (37.8)	10.8 (51.4)	16.6 (61.9)	19.9 (67.8)	18.3 (64.9)	11.1 (52.0)	2.9 (37.2)	−6.8 (19.8)	−15.6 (3.9)	1.8 (35.2)
Record low °C (°F)	−33.7 (−28.7)	−31.5 (−24.7)	−20.0 (−4.0)	−11.6 (11.1)	−0.8 (30.6)	4.5 (40.1)	10.3 (50.5)	3.9 (39.0)	−3.7 (25.3)	−10.5 (13.1)	−24.7 (−12.5)	−31.2 (−24.2)	−33.7 (−28.7)
Average precipitation mm (inches)	4.5 (0.18)	5.9 (0.23)	12.4 (0.49)	22.1 (0.87)	57.2 (2.25)	89.1 (3.51)	139.0 (5.47)	134.8 (5.31)	49.6 (1.95)	26.3 (1.04)	15.6 (0.61)	6.2 (0.24)	562.7 (22.15)
Average precipitation days (≥ 0.1 mm)	4.2	3.6	4.8	5.8	10.3	12.8	12.8	12.3	7.9	6.3	5.4	4.9	91.1
Average snowy days	6.8	5.4	6.3	2.2	0.1	0	0	0	0	1.7	5.9	7.7	36.1
Average relative humidity (%)	64	56	51	45	51	64	77	78	68	61	62	65	62
Mean monthly sunshine hours	193.4	211.5	244.9	240.4	263.5	250.8	239.3	241.3	249.2	223.9	181.2	173.6	2,713
Percentage possible sunshine	66	71	66	59	58	55	52	56	67	66	63	63	62
Source: China Meteorological Administration

== Notable persons ==
- Wang Gongquan
- Li Hongzhi
