= Open Constitution Initiative =

Defunct organization in China

The Open Constitution Initiative (OCI) (Chinese: 公盟; pinyin: gōngméng), sometimes referred to in English as Gongmeng, was an organization consisting of lawyers and academics in the People's Republic of China that advocated for the rule of law and greater constitutional protections. It was established by Peking University Law School scholars Xu Zhiyong, Teng Biao, Yu Jiang, and Zhang Xingshui in 2003, and was shut down by the Chinese government in 2009.

== Proposed Constitutional Amendments ==
In 2004, the group proposed amendment to include "human rights" in the Constitution, and petitioned it to the National People's Congress.

== Background ==
Since 2002, online independent media and tabloids have played an important role in political discourse within Chinese society. Many Chinese intellectuals have used the Internet to discuss the possible evolution of Chinese politics. The OCI is a group of such intellectuals whose website contained essays about constitutional issues and the protection of citizen's rights. One notable lawyer who is part of the group is Xu Zhiyong.

== Activities ==
=== 2003 ===
Xu Zhiyong, Teng Biao, and Yu Jiang raised the unconstitutionality of the investigation in the Sun Zhigang incident. In December, Xu was elected as a representative of the People's Congress of Haidian, Beijing.

=== 2004 ===
Participated in the drafting of a proposed amendment to include "human rights" in the Constitution, submitted to the National People's Congress; followed the Henan incident where authorities forcibly closed the HIV/AIDS orphanage known as "Home of Care and Love"; defended Yu Huafeng and Cheng Yizhong, the General Manager and Editor in Chief, respectively, of the Southern Metropolitan Daily; participated in representing the four innocent Chengde citizens who were sentenced, five times, to the death penalty; organized a symposium to discuss the legitimacy of the relocation of the Beijing Zoo.

On 8 June 2004, Chinese internet authorities shut down its web site without specifying a precise reason. The crackdown came during a time of heightened political tension regarding the Taiwan Straits and the 15th anniversary of the Tiananmen Square protests of 1989, and also during events symbolic of China's increasing international interdependence, such as the visit of the Greek Olympian envoy.

=== 2005 ===
Conducted research on China's petitioning ("xinfang") system; pushed for Local People's Congress Delegate Reception Day; researched the local people's congress system; began writing the 2005 Report on the Development of Human Rights in China.

=== 2006 ===
Completed the 2005 Report on the Development of Human Rights in China; followed the Beijing taxi price hike and reform of the management system; completed the Research Report on China's Xinfang System; monitored the direct election of the Haidian District of Beijing Municipality Local People's Congress; spoke out for the education rights of migrant children; wrote proposed legislative amendments to the Beijing Measures on the Administration of Dog Ownership.

=== 2007 ===
Assisted with the administrative suit on behalf of victims of the illegal brick kilns; followed the Zhongguancun demolition and relocation case; launched various citizen participation activities.

=== 2008 ===
Organized a Pro Bono Legal Aid Team to conduct public interest litigation on behalf of victims of the tainted milk scandal; promoted direct elections within the Beijing Lawyers Association.

=== 2009 ===
Released an investigative report into the causes of the 3.14 incident in Tibet; launched activities to promote open government information, including requesting the disclosure of three specific types of public expenditures; hosted a legal organization training workshop where legal knowledge relating to rights defence and elections was discussed; provided legal aid to Deng Yujiao, victims of "black jails", and petitioners; launched residence committee elections and organized symposiums on Green Dam, mental disability, and many more issues; in order to guide public opinion on a path of rational development, expressed public opinion on many important issues.

The organization published a report criticising the Chinese government's policy towards Tibet, alleging that propaganda was being used to mask failings in its Tibet policy, such as ethnic inequality and creating "an aristocracy of corrupt and abusive government officials". It has been regarded as a more balanced view of the situation in Tibet and has had approval circulating through discussion websites in China, though the Chinese government has yet to comment.

=== Closure ===
On July 14, 2009, the organization was fined 1.46 million RMB. On July 17, 2009, authorities declared the organization "illegal" and shut it down. On 29 July 2009, Xu Zhiyong was arrested on charges of 'tax evasion'. He was subsequently released on bail on 23 August 2009. On August 21, 2010, the public security bureau of Beijing dropped all the charges, returned all its items formerly held in custody, and released Xu from bail. Xu and others continued their works and activities with a new organization name Gongmin ("citizen(s)", Chinese: 公民; pinyin: gōngmín). However, his administrative assistant, Zhuang Lu, is reported to have disappeared, possibly held in a detention house in Beijing.

== See also ==
- Human rights in the People's Republic of China
- Law of the People's Republic of China
- Weiquan movement
- Internet censorship in the People's Republic of China
- Internet freedom
- Freedom of the press
