= Modern Dairy =

Chinese dairy company

China Modern Dairy
- Industry: Dairy
- Headquarters: Ma'anshan, Anhui
- Key people: Deng Jiuqiang (Founder & Chairman)
- Products: Milk
- Website: moderndairyir.com

Modern Dairy is a Chinese dairy and the largest producer of milk in China. The dairy counts 15 industrial farms and an additional 4 are under construction. KKR is a major investor, putting in along with other investors $150 million into the dairy.
