= Guo Yushan =

Chinese human rights activist (born 1977)

Guo Yushan (simplified Chinese: 郭玉闪; traditional Chinese: 郭玉閃; pinyin: Guō Yùshǎn; born 1977) is a Chinese scholar and human rights activist. He is a co-founder of a non-governmental organization Transition Institute. He was detained on October 12, 2014, on the criminal charge of provoking troubles.

In 2012, Guo was instrumental in helping the blind activist Chen Guangcheng travel to Beijing after Chen escaped from house arrest in an eastern Chinese village. Chen then sought shelter in the U.S. Embassy and subsequently went to the United States to study law after negotiations on his behalf by the U.S. Secretary of State, Hillary Clinton.
