= Xu Zhiyong =

Chinese civil rights activist and academic (born 1973)

- 许志永
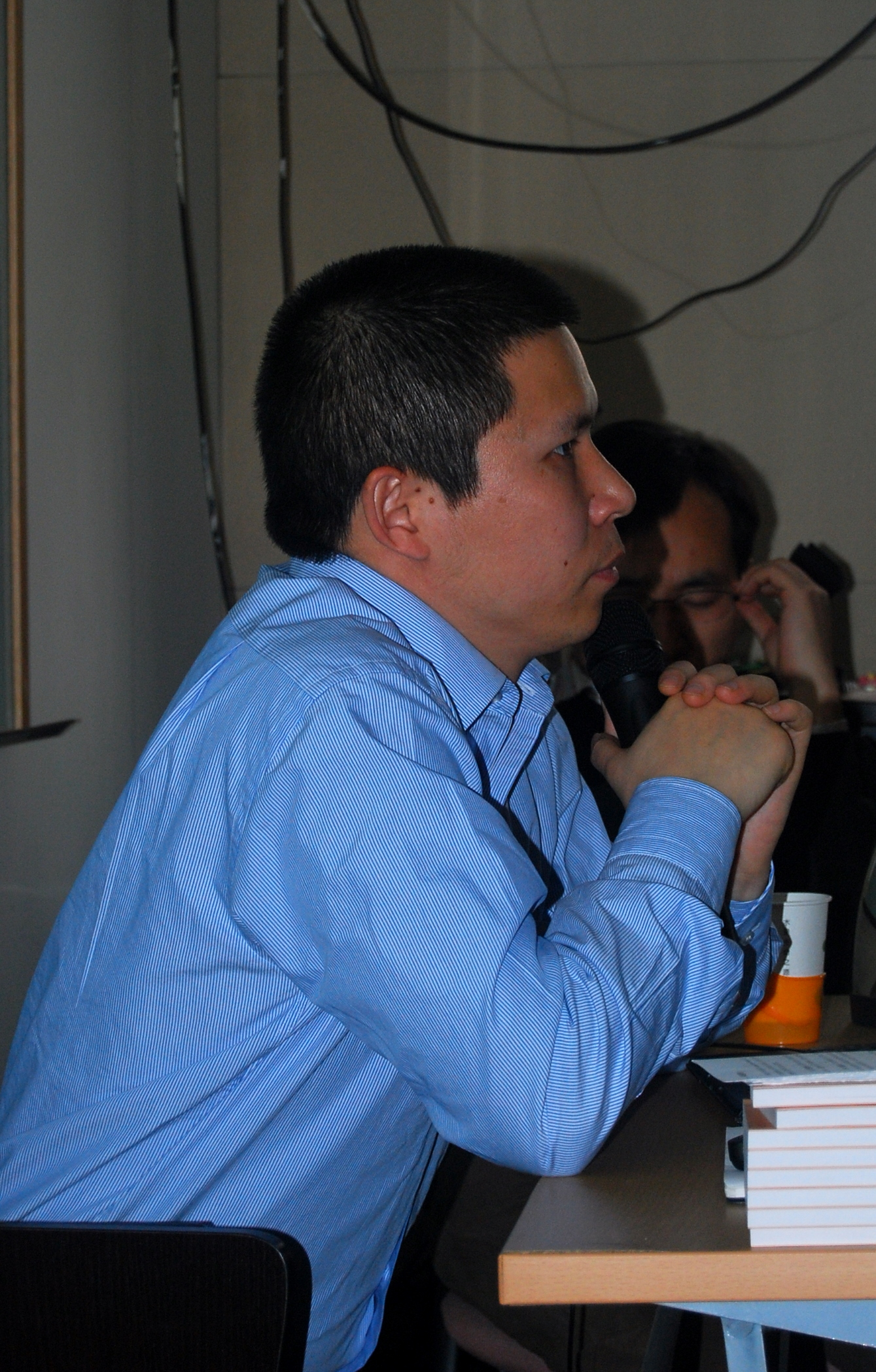
- Born: March 2, 1973 (age 53); Minquan County, Henan, China
- Education: Lanzhou University (LLB); Peking University (PhD)
- Occupations: Legal scholar, lecturer
- Employer: Beijing University of Post and Telecommunications (Previous)
- Organization: Open Constitution Initiative (Gongmeng)
- Known for: Civil rights advocacy, advocacy of constitutionalism
- Movement: New Citizens Movement; Weiquan movement
- Criminal charges: Disruption of public order (Politically motivated); Subversion
- Criminal penalty: Imprisonment (4 Years in 2014, 14 Years in 2023)
- Spouse: Cui Zheng (divorced)
- Awards: Foreign Policy Top 100 Global Thinkers (2013); PEN/Barbey Freedom to Write Award (2020)

Xu Zhiyong (Chinese: 许志永; pinyin: Xǔ Zhìyǒng; born March 2, 1973) is a Chinese civil rights activist and formerly a lecturer at the Beijing University of Post and Telecommunications. He was one of the founders of the NGO Open Constitution Initiative and an active rights lawyer in China who campaigned against corruption and helped those underprivileged. He is the main founder and icon of the New Citizens' Movement in China. In January 2014 he was sentenced to four years in prison for "gathering crowds to disrupt public order". He was detained again on February 15, 2020, in the southern city of Guangzhou after two months in hiding, for his participation in a meeting of rights activists and lawyers in Xiamen in December 2019 in which "democratic transition in China" was discussed. He was sentenced for subversion to 14 years in jail on April 10, 2023.

== Education and career ==
Xu was born in Minquan County, Henan Province in 1973. In 1990, he enrolled in the School of Law at Lanzhou University and obtained a Bachelor of Laws degree in 1994. He obtained a Doctor of Law degree from Peking University in 2002. After 2002, he served as a lecturer at the School of Humanities and Law, Beijing University of Posts and Telecommunications.

== Activism ==
=== The Gongmeng era ===
In 2003, he was elected to the Haidian District People's Congress as an independent. He won the re-election in 2006. In the 2011 election, Xu was excluded from the official candidate list due to government pressure and he lost to Fang Binxing ("Father of China's Great Firewall"), but he still gathered more than 3,500 votes out of 22,000 voters in his district as a write-in candidate.

Xu helped found the public interest group Gongmeng, also known as the Open Constitution Initiative.

Unlike other human rights activists, Xu firmly and carefully pushed his calls for political change and social justice in existing laws, and his group has been regarded as relatively cautious and conservative. In a 2009 interview with the Chinese version of Esquire magazine before his arrest, he described his dream as follows:

I wish our country could be a free and happy one. Every citizen need not go against their conscience and can find their own place by their virtue and talents; a simple and happy society, where the goodness of humanity is expanded to the maximum, and the evilness of humanity is constrained to the minimum; honesty, trust, kindness, and helping each other are everyday occurrences in life; there is not so much anger and anxiety, a pure smile on everyone's face.

— Xu Zhiyong

Xu's final remarks post-trial also made rounds within Chinese dissident communities abroad in which he described the goal of the New Citizens' Movement as follows:

What the New Citizens Movement advocates is for each and every Chinese national to act and behave as a citizen, to accept our roles as citizens and masters of our country—and not to act as feudal subjects, remain complacent, accept mob rule or a position as an underclass. To take seriously the rights which come with citizenship, those written into the Universal Declaration of Human Rights and China's Constitution: to treat these sacred rights—to vote, to freedom of speech and religion—as more than an everlasting IOU.

— Xu Zhiyong (2014)

=== The 2009 Gongmeng incident ===
On July 29, 2009, he was arrested at his home, and detained by Chinese authorities on charges of tax evasion. At the same time Xu's colleague Zhuang Lu was also arrested by authorities.

The Open Constitution Initiative was fined 1.46 million RMB on July 14, 2009, for 'dodging taxes' and was shut down by the authorities by declaring it "illegal".

Xu Zhiyong was released on bail on August 23, 2009. Australian newspaper The Age reported that the release of Xu, Zhuang and another Chinese dissident, Ilham Tohti, was in part due to pressure on Beijing from the administration of American President Barack Obama.

=== Post-Gongmeng era, New Citizens' Movement, 2013 arrest ===
After Gongmeng was shut down, Xu Zhiyong and supporters adopted the name "Citizens" to continue their cause. In May 2012, Xu formally established the "New Citizens' Movement" and "New Citizens' Spirit" as the high-level concept of their activism.

In 2013, Xu was placed under house arrest for more than three months, before being formally arrested on August 22. His trial started on January 22, 2014. Xu and his lawyer Zhang Qingfang remained silent throughout the trial (except for his closing statement) to protest the violation of basic legal procedure. Xu's closing statement was cut short by the judge, but the text was circulated on the internet and raised tremendous support. On January 26, Xu was sentenced to four years in prison for "gathering crowds to disrupt public order". Prior to the verdict, whose date had been expected, lawyer Zhang said about the case: "We can say it was decided even before the trial." He was released in 2017.

=== 2020 arrest ===
Xu and other human rights activists were wanted by police for their participation in a meeting in Xiamen on December 13, 2019 where "democratic transition in China" was discussed. In February 2020, while in hiding, through postings on social media, Xu publicly asked Chinese Communist Party general secretary Xi Jinping to resign, for what he described as an obvious inability to handle the COVID-19 pandemic and a lack of intellect and courage. Translated by scholar Geremie Barmé, Xu wrote:

"Where do you think you are taking China? Do you have any clue yourself? You talk about the reform and opening up policy at the same time you are trying to resuscitate the corpse of Marxism-Leninism."

Xu was arrested in Guangzhou on February 15, 2020, according to two fellow activists.

In November 2021, Liang Xiaojun, the lawyer of Xu, had his license cancelled by authorities, with the notification letter citing his online support for Falun Gong and "vilifying" the Chinese constitution and laws. Liang said he had spoken a day earlier via video chat with Xu, who according to Liang was in good health and unshaken in his dissident convictions.

On March 18, 2022, ahead of the EU-China summit, Xu was among the shortlist of human rights defenders called for release in a joint NGO letter to the President of the European Commission and the President of the European Council.

On June 13, 2022, the Intermediate People's Court of Linyi issued a notice of a pretrial meeting scheduled for June 17. Lawyers and a rights group said on June 17 that Xu would stand trial for "subversion" on June 22. He had been indicted on that charge in August 2021, and there had been no information about him since. On April 10, 2023, Xu was sentenced after a closed trial to 14 years in prison; fellow human rights lawyer Ding Jiaxi was sentenced to 12 years on the same charge. In response, UN Human Rights Chief Volker Türk published his statement, "I am very concerned that two prominent human rights defenders in China – Ding Jiaxi and Xu Zhiyong – have been sentenced to lengthy prison terms, at variance with international human rights law standards." Ding and Xu's convictions were upheld in November 2023.

=== Imprisonment ===
On October 4, 2024, Xu started a hunger strike to protest mistreatment in prison, including surveillance by other prisoners and lack of contact with Xu's family members. Then U.S. ambassador to China has called for Xu's release.

== Prominent writings and speeches ==
- Xu Zhiyong's closing statement in court (January 22, 2014) Chinese English (translated by ChinaChange.org)
- The Last Ten Years, China's rights movement through the work of Gong Meng. Chinese English (translated by ChinaChange.org)
- A trip to Ngaba, (the Tibetan prefecture in Northern Sichuan province where many Tibetans have self-immolated over the last four years or so. A shorter version of the essay was published in the New York Times in December 2012). Chinese English (translated by ChinaChange.org)
- New Citizens' Movement, a "manifesto" published on May 29, 2012. Chinese English(translated by ChinaChange.org)
- To Build a Free China: A Citizen's Journey, Lynne Rienner Publishers, Boulder, Colorado, 2017.
- Persuasion to Resign, an open letter asking Xi Jinping to resign.

== Awards ==
- Foreign Policy – Top 100 Global Thinkers, 2013
- National Endowment for Democracy 2014 Democracy Award
- PEN America – PEN/Barbey Freedom to Write Award, 2020. Xu's partner Li Qiaochu, also an activist, accepted the award on his behalf in December 2020.
- Nobel Peace Prize Nominee, 2024
  - On January 31, 2024, Chair Representative Smith Christopher and Co-chair Senator Jeff Merkley of the U.S. Congressional-Executive Commission on China nominated Xu to receive the 2024 Nobel Peace Prize in recognition of his "commitment to human rights and peace in China".

== Personal life ==
Xu was married to Cui Zheng (崔筝), a journalist. Their daughter was born on January 13, 2014, while Xu was in a detention center facing trial. He had been in hiding since late 2019 and was detained by Chinese police on February 15, 2020. In March 2021, his partner Li Qiaochu was reported to have been arrested for tweeting that Xu and another activist had been tortured while in detention.

== See also ==
- Weiquan movement
- New Citizens' Movement (China)
- List of Chinese pro-democracy activists
