= History of China (1976–1989) =

Deng era
- 1976–1989
History of China (1949–1976)	History of China (1989–2002)
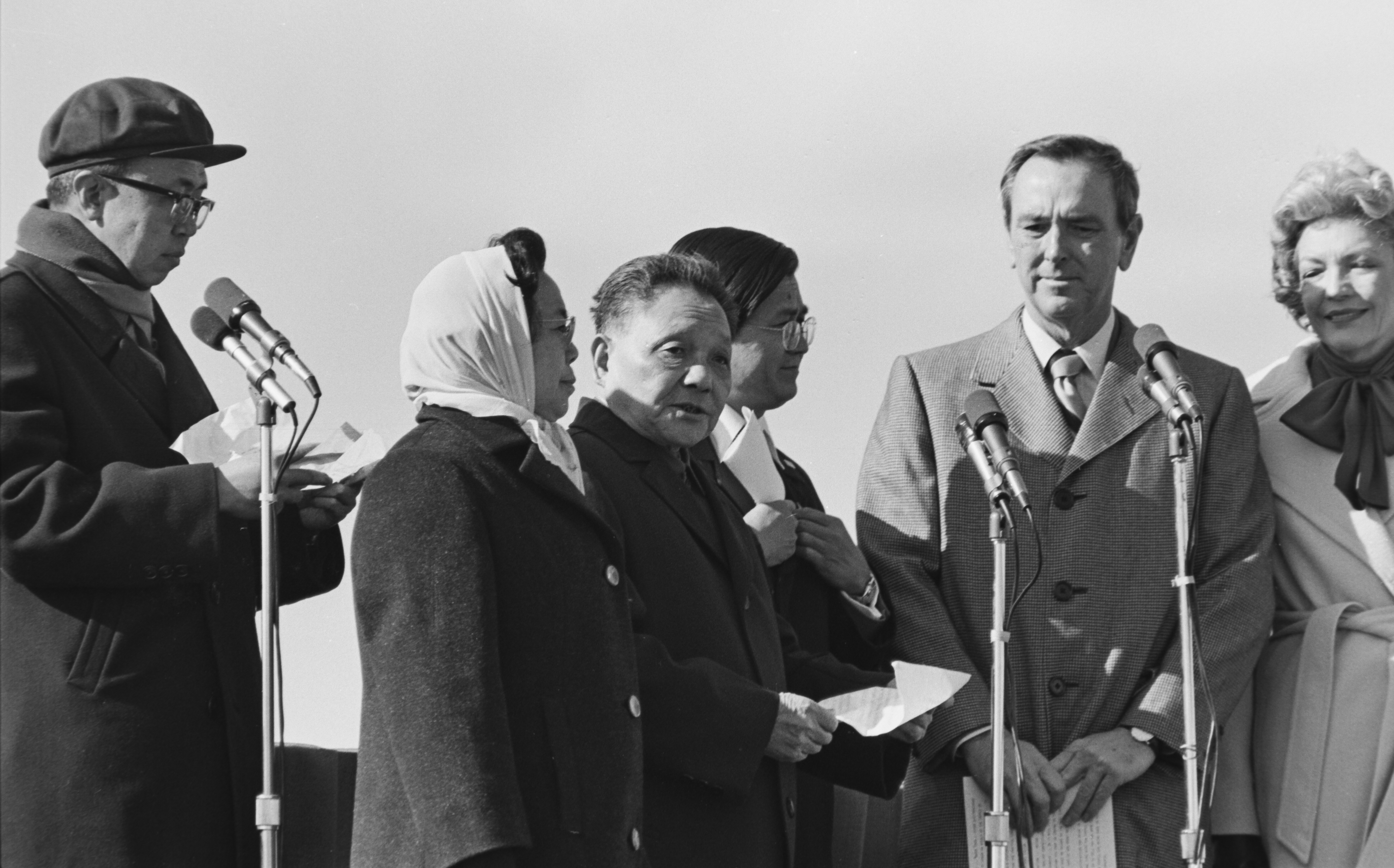
- Xiaoping arrival at Dobbins Air Force base in 1979.
- Location: China
- Including: Eight Elders
- Leader(s): Hua Guofeng; Deng Xiaoping
- President(s): Ye Jianying; Li Xiannian; Yang Shangkun
- Prime Minister(s): Hua Guofeng; Zhao Ziyang; Li Peng
- Key events: Boluan Fanzheng; Reform and opening up Sino-Vietnamese War; 1989 Tiananmen Square protests and massacre

The time period in China from the death of Mao Zedong in 1976 until the 1989 Tiananmen Square protests and massacre is often known as Dengist China, Reform era, or Long 1980s. In September 1976, after CCP Chairman Mao Zedong's death, the People's Republic of China was left with no central authority figure, either symbolically or administratively. The Gang of Four was purged, but new Chairman Hua Guofeng insisted on continuing Maoist policies. After a bloodless power struggle, Deng Xiaoping came to the helm to reform the Chinese economy and government institutions in their entirety. Deng, however, was conservative with regard to wide-ranging political reform, and along with the combination of unforeseen problems that resulted from the reform and opening up policies, the country underwent another political crisis, culminating in the crackdown of massive pro-democracy protests in Tiananmen Square.

== Historiographical periodization ==
This era is sometimes referred to as China's "Long 1980s." While frequently invoked to refer to a broad reform era, different scholars hold different historiographical periodizations. The debates are over when should this period begin and end – 1976 or 1978, 1989 or 1992. Main events during this period include the Third plenary session of the 11th Central Committee of the Chinese Communist Party in 1978, the debate on humanism and alienation and subsequent “anti-spiritual pollution” campaign in 1983, the 1986 student protests and subsequent “anti-bourgeois liberalization” campaign in 1987, the 1989 Tiananmen protests and subsequent crackdown, Deng Xiaoping’s Southern Tour and the subsequent 14th Party Congress in 1992.

== Power struggles after Mao's death ==
=== Hua Guofeng and the return of Deng Xiaoping (1976–1978) ===
Mao Zedong, Chairman of the Chinese Communist Party (CCP), died on September 9, 1976. The CCP, in the wake of his death, officially urged "[the carrying out of] Chairman Mao's revolutionary line and policies in foreign affairs resolutely." At the time of his death, China was in a political and economic quagmire. The Cultural Revolution and subsequent factional fighting had left the country much poorer, weaker, and isolated than it had been in 1965. Scores of capable party officials, bureaucrats, intellectuals, and professionals were languishing in prison or laboring in factories, mines, and fields. Many schools had been closed, and an entire generation of young people were unable to obtain an education, coming of age as a "lost generation", finding it harder to be employed and integrate into social life.

Chinese people mourned him, but not in the more emotional way they had mourned the late Premier Zhou Enlai. Meanwhile, Mao's designated successor Hua Guofeng had assumed the post of party chairman. Hua was unaware that the Gang of Four were plotting his downfall until Defense Minister Ye Jianying and several generals warned him about this, saying that he'd better do something before it was too late. Hua was a bit surprised, but he agreed, and on the 6th or 7 October the Gang were arrested. None of them put up any resistance, although one of Jiang Qing's housekeepers reportedly spat at her as she was being taken away.

The demise and arrest of the Gang of Four prompted nationwide celebrations, such as parades in the streets, not limited to Beijing and other major cities. The Gang of Four symbolized everything that went wrong during the ten years of chaos of the Cultural Revolution, and their demise, the general populace had expected, would mark the beginning of a new era.

In late 1976 and early 1977, the state propaganda machine was working overtime to promote Hua Guofeng. He was billed as being Mao's personally appointed successor (with paintings produced showing him receiving Mao's final blessings) and as having saved China from the Gang of Four. Hua tried to fill his mentor's shoes by, among other things, sporting an identical haircut. He stated that "in order to honor Chairman Mao, we should govern in accordance with his wishes." and proclaimed the Two Whatevers, meaning that "Whatever Chairman Mao said, we will say, and whatever Chairman Mao did, we will do." Throughout 1977–78, policy efforts centered around economic recovery. Schools began to reopen, and the more extreme aspects of Mao's personality cult were toned down. It was now being said that he was a great leader and thinker, but not an infallible god and that the revolution had been the work of many people and not just him. The Cultural Revolution was said to have been a well-meaning idea that got out of control, and Hua declared that a second Cultural Revolution might be necessary in a few years. Beginning in April 1978, newspapers stopped printing Mao's quotations in bold text. Nuclear weapons testing, missile, and space launches continued apace.

Hua's reliance on Maoist orthodoxy led him to continue a cult of personality surrounding his own image alongside Mao's, equating his presence to that of Mao, but pinpointing the focus at a nominally separate era. To provide for distinct identity, Hua attempted his own change of the Chinese written language by further simplifying characters. A small number of these Hua-era simplifications continue to be in use informally, as there was no formal sanction of their legitimacy after Hua left office. In 1978, the National Anthem was changed to reflect pure communist ideology rather than revolutionary drive, inserting lyrics exclusively dealing with Mao Zedong Thought and building an ideal socialist nation, as opposed to the wartime patriotism reflected by the original lyrics. However, Hua faced difficulty legitimizing his power due to continuing factional struggle and the fact that his rule was not legitimized by the NPC until his prior promotion to party chairman was legally ratified in 1977.

Hua's unimaginative policies received relatively little support, and he was regarded as an unremarkable leader, lacking political support within the Politburo. At the time Deng Xiaoping was still living in seclusion because of "political mistakes," and the issue of his return to politics was yet again put on the table. Deng had insisted on supporting all of Hua's policies in one of the letters the two men exchanged, to which Hua responded that Deng had "made mistakes, and rightfully must continue to receive criticism." The arrest of the Gang of Four, Hua said, did not justify the resurfacing of Deng's "revisionist" ideas. During a Politburo meeting in March 1977 many members voiced support for Deng's return to no avail. In a letter to Hua dated April 10 Deng Xiaoping wrote, "I am fully behind Chairman Hua's policies and agenda for the country." This letter would be openly discussed in the Politburo and in July 1977 Deng Xiaoping was restored in his former posts. In August, the 11th Party Congress was held, which again rehabilitated Deng and confirmed his election as the new Committee Vice-chairman and the Central Military Commission's vice-chairman. Deng guaranteed the elevation of his supporters, Hu Yaobang, Zhao Ziyang, and Wan Li.

On 5 March 1978 a new constitution was adopted. This was the third one used by the PRC after the original 1954 document which was scarcely implemented (particularly after the Anti-Rightist Movement) and referred to by Mao as being "[in many parts] obsolete" by 1958, and the short-lived 1975 "Gang of Four" constitution. The new one was patterned after the 1954 constitution and attempted to restore some rule of law and mechanisms for economic planning. In regards to the latter, Hua Guofeng wanted a return to the Soviet-style economics of the mid-1950s. He drew up a ten-year plan which emphasized heavy industry, energy, and capital construction.

In regards to foreign policy, Hua made his first trip abroad in May 1978. This was a visit to the Democratic People's Republic of Korea, where he was given a warm reception and joined North Korean leader Kim Il Sung in calling for the United States to withdraw its troops from the Republic of Korea. In September, Deng Xiaoping also visited the North Korean capital Pyongyang. He was unimpressed with Kim Il-sung's extensive personality cult, having seen enough of this sort of thing in China with Mao and also took umbrage at being expected to lay a wreath in front of the giant gold-plated statue of Kim in Pyongyang. Deng reportedly expressed his displeasure at how the aid money given to North Korea by China over the years was being spent on statues and monuments honoring Kim. He suggested that they might be better served using that aid to improve their people's living standards. The North Koreans appeared to have gotten the message, for the gold plating was quietly scraped off the Kim statue in Pyongyang afterwards.

Trying to crawl out of its international isolation, China mended fences with President of Yugoslavia Josip Tito, who visited Beijing in May 1977 after having been long denounced as a "revisionist" and a traitor. In October 1978, Deng Xiaoping visited Japan and concluded a peace treaty with that country's prime minister Takeo Fukuda, officially ending the state of war that had existed between the two countries since the 1930s. While Japan and China had in fact opened diplomatic relations in 1972, the peace treaty took nearly six years to negotiate, one major sticking point being Chinese insistence on Tokyo including a clause that denounced Soviet "hegemony" in Asia.

There was little sign of improved relations with the Soviet Union, and Deng Xiaoping declared the 1950 Sino-Soviet friendship treaty to be null and void. Relations with Vietnam suddenly turned hostile in 1979. These two countries had once been allies, but in 1972 Mao Zedong told Vietnamese premier Pham Van Dong that they should stop expecting Chinese aid and that the old historical feud between the two countries would erupt again. China also gave its support to the genocidal Khmer Rouge regime that took power in Cambodia during 1975, provoking the hostility of the Soviet-backed Vietnamese government. In January 1979, Vietnam invaded Cambodia and drove the Khmer Rouge from power. During his U.S. visit, Deng Xiaoping remarked that Vietnam would have to "be taught a lesson". In February, a full-scale Chinese attack was launched on the Vietnamese border. Although China withdrew after three weeks and declared its objectives met, the war had not gone well and demonstrated the country's weakness. The PLA lost over 20,000 men due to weapons and equipment that were outdated, poorly made, and in short supply (a side effect of the disruption caused by the Cultural Revolution), maps that were decades old, the continued use of human-wave tactics from the Korean War, and the fact that the army had no system of ranks. Even worse was that the Chinese had not even engaged Vietnam's regular army (which was in Cambodia), but instead fought militia and home guard units. On the other hand, it was a political victory since the Soviet Union had failed to come to its ally's aid and contented itself with verbal protests. In reference to Moscow's inaction, Deng Xiaoping reiterated Mao Zedong's saying that "You can't know how the tiger will react until you poke its backside."

China finally fully established diplomatic relations with the United States on January 1, 1979. This had been planned since President Nixon's visit in February 1972, but was delayed by the Watergate scandal and the US withdrawal from Vietnam. The US agreed to recognize the PRC as China's sole government. Diplomatic relations with Taiwan were terminated, but unofficial and commercial ties remained. Deng Xiaoping visited the U.S. in February and met with President Carter. Meanwhile, Hua Guofeng headed to Europe in May. He first stopped in France, reportedly because it was the first western nation to recognize the PRC, and made a fierce attack on Soviet expansionism and hegemony. Later, he visited West Germany, asking all "peace-loving states" to "demand a stop to aggression and hegemonism", thought to be a veiled reference to the Soviet Union, and expressed his support for German reunification, a move criticized by the East German news. He displayed some restraint, however, and decided against making what would have been a highly provocative visit to the Berlin Wall.

China's establishment of diplomatic ties with the United States brought about a mixed reaction from the communist world similar to Richard Nixon's 1972 visit. While the Soviets could not condemn this, they were deeply worried about Sino-US collusion against them. Romanian dictator Nicolae Ceaușescu hailed it as "an outstanding event in the service of peace", while Yugoslav leader Josip Broz Tito welcomed the thaw as "a contribution of peaceful coexistence between nations". North Korea also congratulated "our brotherly neighbor for ending long-hostile relations and establishing diplomatic ties with the US" while Cuba and Albania openly denounced Beijing as traitors to the cause of world socialism. Sino-Albanian relations would deteriorate over the course of the next six years, ending in the termination of diplomatic correspondence between the two countries in 1978.

=== Deng becomes Paramount Leader ===
Although Hua continued in his leadership role, his power began waning the moment Deng Xiaoping returned to Beijing. The two continued to co-rule for a time, but the latter was rapidly gaining power. With Mao and Zhou Enlai gone, there was no one else in China with his experience and leadership abilities and his ideas seemed fresh and appealing as opposed to Hua's stale promotion of Mao Zedong Thought. Hua was quickly seen as being nothing more than a vacuous party hack with no ideas of his own. This was reflected in the 1978 constitution, which still contained references to proletarian internationalism and continuous revolution. As Vice-Premier in charge of Technology and Education, Deng restored the University Entrance Examinations in 1977, opening the doors of post-secondary education to nearly a generation of youth who lacked this opportunity because of the Cultural Revolution, with 680,000 passing the first entrance exams, though some remained cut off from education. He elevated the social status of intellectuals from the lows of the Cultural Revolution to becoming an "integral part of socialist construction."

Deng chaired the (11th) National Congress of the Chinese Communist Party, China's de jure legislative body, and stressed the importance of the Four Modernizations, a series of advances in various fields aimed at strengthening the country by adapting to modern standards. By then Deng was poised to make a final political move to grab power. On May 11, 1978, the Guangming Daily newspaper published an article, inspected by Deng's supporter Hu Yaobang, titled "Practice sets the only Standard to Examine Truth". The article stressed the importance of uniting theory and practice, denounced the dogmatic euphoria of the Mao era, and was, in fact, an outright criticism on Hua's Two Whatevers policy. This article was reprinted in many newspapers across the country, and echoed widespread support amongst party organs and the general populace. Discussions sprung up nationwide in government and military organizations, and Deng's novel and pragmatic stance gained increasing popularity.

Despite the freshness of Deng's ideas, in truth his ideas were not really new, but merely an effort to restore China to the situation of the mid-1960s, right before the Cultural Revolution, and in any case, the Politburo continued to be a gerontocracy dominated by men born in the opening years of the 20th century, all of whom had participated in the Long March and Chinese civil war. The 81 year old Ye Jianying was forced to step down as defense minister in 1978 for health reasons and even with the death of several party elders during the 1970s, the average age of the Central Committee was still around 70.

In April, Deng began the political rehabilitation of those who were formerly labeled "rightists" and counter-revolutionaries, a campaign led by Hu Yaobang that pardoned the wrongly accused, restoring the reputation of many party elders and intellectuals who were purged during the Cultural Revolution and other campaigns going all the way back to the Anti-Rightist Movement in 1957. Prominent politically disgraced people including Peng Dehuai, Zhang Wentian, He Long and Tao Zhu were given belated rank-appropriate funerals at the Babaoshan Revolutionary Cemetery. Liu Shaoqi was given a large state funeral in May 1980, when the country was asked to mourn the former president eleven years after his death. During this time, the CCP also established rules for an orderly succession of state and government leaders. Deng Xiaoping proposed mandatory retirement ages despite some protests from party elders and also guidelines were put in place that CCP members who lost their posts or were removed from office could not be jailed or subjected to physical harm. In this regard, Deng borrowed much from Soviet leader Nikita Khrushchev when the latter had ended Stalin's terror state and established the practice of using more peaceful methods to dispose of his political rivals. To that end, CCP figures such as Hua Guofeng were merely demoted to unimportant posts, but otherwise retained their party membership and state pension.

In 1979, the CCP made a pledge to the nation that it would never again embark on mass campaigns like the Cultural Revolution.

Meanwhile, the Gang of Four went on trial in 1980 on charges of counterrevolution, attempting to overthrow the state, and plotting to assassinate Mao. Only Jiang Qing tried to defend herself, repeatedly interrupting the proceedings with hysterical outbursts and sobbing. She argued that she had never done anything more than follow Mao's orders, saying "I was his dog. Whoever he told me to bite, I bit." and daring the authorities to cut off her head. The others were given life in prison, but Jiang was sentenced to death. However, Mao's memory still lingered strong, and her sentence was later commuted to life. She hanged herself in a Beijing hospital in 1991 while undergoing treatment for throat cancer.

The power transition from Hua to Deng was confirmed in December 1978, at the Third Plenum of the Central Committee of the Eleventh National Party Congress, a turning point in China's history. The course was laid for the party to move the world's most populous nation toward the ambitious targets of the Four Modernizations.

After a decade of turmoil brought about by the Cultural Revolution, the new direction set at this meeting was toward economic development and away from class struggle. The plenum endorsed major changes in the political, economic, and social system. Hua renounced his Two Whatevers and offered a full self-criticism. Replacing the old focus of class struggles was the new policy focused on economic construction.

It also instituted sweeping personnel changes, culminating in the elevation of two key supporters of Deng Xiaoping and the reform program, Hu Yaobang and Zhao Ziyang. In contrast to previous leadership changes, Hua would resign his posts one by one, although he remained on the Politburo until 1982. Hua was replaced by Zhao Ziyang as Premier of the State Council in September 1980, and by Hu Yaobang as Party General Secretary of the party in September 1982. The post of chairman was abolished to ensure that no one person could ever dominate the party as Mao Zedong had done. Until the mid-1990s, Deng Xiaoping was China's de facto Paramount leader, retaining only the official title of Chairman of the Central Military Commission, but not the chief offices of the State, government, or the Party. Meanwhile, Li Xiannian was appointed to the post of Chinese President, vacant since 1968. Li was a believer in central planning, and his appointment to this largely ceremonial position was a compromise move to appease conservative elements in the party.

With changes to the Constitution of China in 1982, the President was conceived of as a figurehead head of state, with actual power resting in the hands of the Premier of China and the General Secretary of the Party, who were meant to be two separate people. In the original plan, the Party would develop policy, and the state would execute it. Deng's intentions were to have power divided, thus preventing a cult of personality from forming as it did in the case of Mao. The new emphasis on procedure, however, seemed largely undermined by Deng himself, who assumed none of the official titles on the grounds that they should go to younger men.

After 1979, the Chinese leadership moved toward more pragmatic policies in almost all fields. The party encouraged artists, writers and journalists to adopt more critical approaches, although open attacks on party authority were not permitted. The Chinese government repudiated the Cultural Revolution. A major document presented at the September 1979 Fourth Plenum of the Eleventh National Party Congress Central Committee, gave a "preliminary assessment" of the entire 30-year period of Communist rule. At the plenum, party Vice Chairman Ye Jianying declared the Cultural Revolution "an appalling catastrophe" and "the most severe setback to [the] socialist cause since [1949]." The Chinese government's condemnation of the Cultural Revolution culminated in the Resolution on Certain Questions in the History of Our Party Since the Founding of the People's Republic of China, adopted by the sixth plenary session of the Eleventh Central Committee of the Chinese Communist Party. This stated that "Comrade Mao Zedong was a great Marxist and a great proletarian revolutionary, strategist and theorist. It is true that he made gross mistakes during the "cultural revolution", but, if we judge his activities as a whole, his contributions to the Chinese revolution far outweigh his mistakes. His merits are primary and his errors secondary." As political ideology was downgraded, numerous statues of Mao were removed around the country and portraits of Marx, Engels, and Lenin, were taken down from Tiananmen Square. Joseph Stalin's portrait remained until 1989.

In late 1978, after an official evaluation of the 1976 Tiananmen Incident as a "completely a revolutionary event", many emboldened people began staging rallies and protests in Beijing. They erected a large number of posters at Democracy Wall criticizing the Cultural Revolution, Mao Zedong, the Gang of Four, and Hua Guofeng. All these were tolerated because of being more-or-less in line with official positions, but some began calling for democracy and open elections. One candidate for a local position even declared his disbelief in communism. This was more than the authorities were willing to tolerate and they quickly stressed that the party would continue to hold power and guide the nation towards socialism. While greater freedom of thought would be allowed, loyalty to the party and socialist thought would still be required. Certain critics were arrested, including Wei Jingsheng, who put up a poster about a fifth modernization, i.e. democracy.

== Boluan Fanzheng and economic reform ==
=== A new page in diplomacy ===
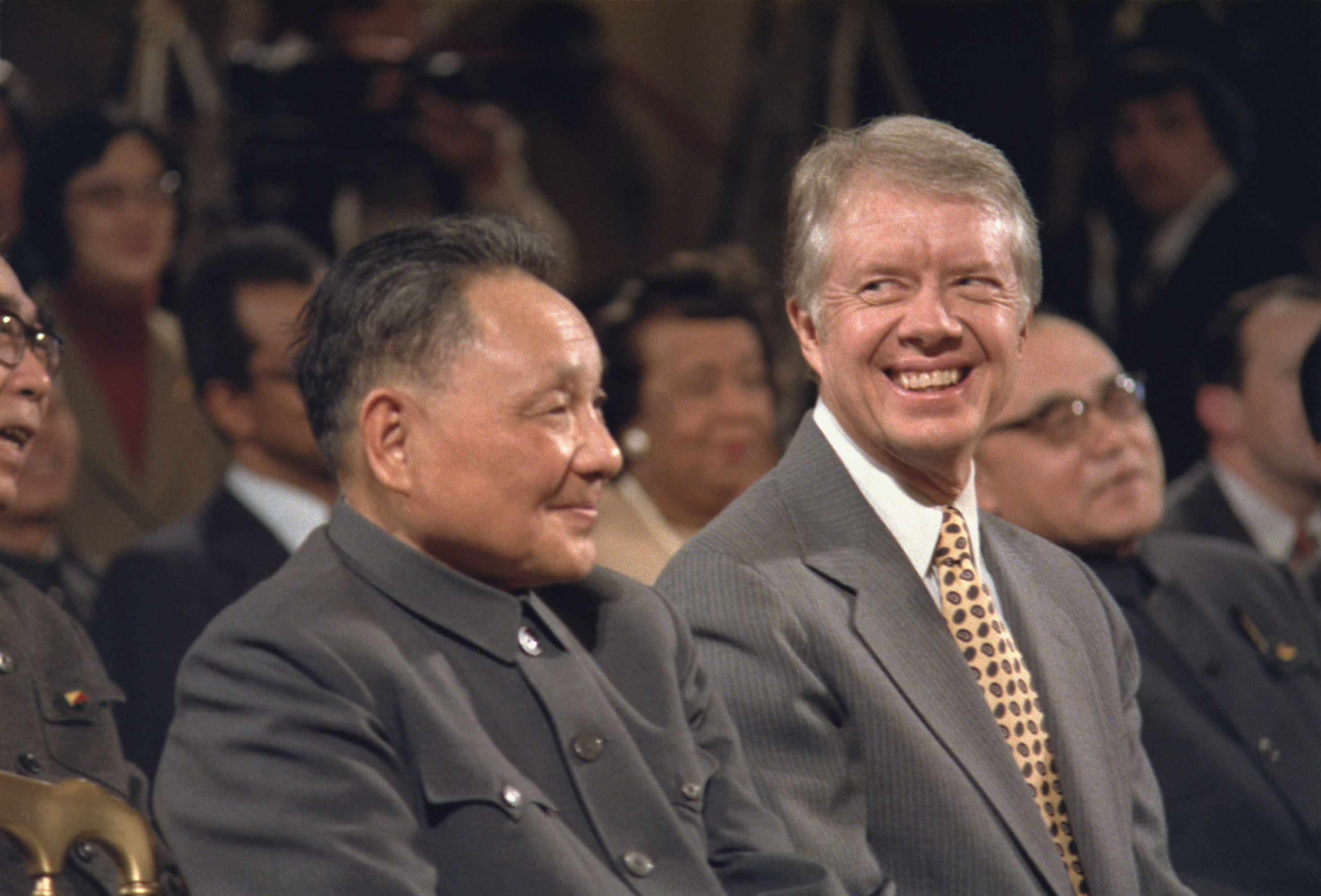
Deng Xiaoping with US President Jimmy Carter, January 1979

Relations with the West improved markedly during Deng's term, although the People's Republic of China had gained a certain degree of recognition from the West in the late Mao era. In 1968, the government of Canadian Prime Minister Pierre Elliott Trudeau initiated negotiations with the People's Republic of China that led to the establishment of diplomatic relations between China and Canada on October 13, 1970. Canada and China established resident diplomatic missions in 1971, and it led to a series of diplomatic successes in the west. The People's Republic of China joined the United Nations in 1971, replacing the international legitimacy previously held by the Kuomintang Government of the Republic of China on the island of Taiwan. In February 1972, US President Richard Nixon made an unprecedented eight-day visit to the People's Republic of China and met with Mao Zedong and Zhou Enlai. On February 22, 1973, the United States and the PRC agreed to establish liaison offices. David K. E. Bruce became the first U.S. liaison to Beijing on May 14, 1973, and Huang Zhen arrived in Washington as China's liaison on May 30. Full diplomatic relations were established in 1979.

Deng traveled abroad and had a series of amicable meetings with western leaders, traveling to the United States in 1979 to meet President Jimmy Carter at the White House. Carter finally recognized the People's Republic, which had replaced the Taiwan-based Republic of China as the sole Chinese government recognized by the UN Security Council in 1971. In response to Carter's recognition of the PRC, the United States Congress passed the Taiwan Relations Act in order to maintain unofficial diplomatic, cultural and economic relations with the governing authorities on Taiwan. One of Deng's achievements was the agreement signed by the United Kingdom and the PRC on December 19, 1984, under which Hong Kong was to be transferred to the PRC in 1997. With the 99-year lease on the New Territories coming to an end, Deng agreed that the PRC would not interfere with Hong Kong's capitalist system and would allow the locals a high degree of autonomy for at least 50 years. This "one country, two systems" approach has been touted by the PRC government as a potential framework within which Taiwan could be reunited with the mainland. Deng, however, did not improve relations with the Soviet Union. He continued to adhere to the Maoist line of the Sino-Soviet Split era, which stated that the Soviet Union was a superpower equally as "hegemonist" as the United States, yet even more threatening to the PRC because of its closer proximity. Deng brought China conflict with Vietnam in 1979, following the Vietnam War, under this subject of border disputes, and fought in the Sino-Vietnamese War.

"Red China" was a frequent appellation for the PRC between the Communist ascendancy and the mid-late 1970s with the rapprochement between China and the West (generally within the capitalist/Western bloc). The term was first used, before the establishment of the PRC, in the late 1940s during the Chinese Civil War, to describe the Communist side to differentiate from Western bloc countries that recognized the Republic of China (ROC) as "Free China" or "Nationalist China", and saw great prevalence in the 1950s, 1960s, and early 1970s. Starting around 1972–1973, following Richard Nixon's visit to China and the beginning of rapprochement and mounting likelihood of diplomatic normalization, the term began to drop in usage significantly. By the early 1980s, it was increasingly rare in mainstream journalism and publications in the Western countries. Since the early 1980s, however, the term remains in use in some circles, particularly right-wing or conservative political discourse and publications; nonetheless, some, including some conservatives, feel the term is not applicable to China in the contemporary period as the country is no longer a "monolithic political entity whose subjects march in lockstep with an all-powerful Communist regime". As of the early 2000s, "Red China" still retains some use among more right-wing writers, especially when framing China as an economic or political competitor or opponent (e.g. the "China threat" theory). "Red China" is sometimes used in more mainstream/less overtly partisan journalism for metaphoric or comparative use (e.g. "Red China or Green", New York Times article title).

=== Sino-Vietnamese War of 1979 ===
China's relations with the Socialist Republic of Vietnam began to deteriorate seriously in the mid-1970s. After Vietnam joined the Soviet-dominated Council for Mutual Economic Cooperation (Comecon) and signed the Treaty of Friendship and Cooperation with the Soviet Union in 1978, China branded Vietnam the "Cuba of the East" and called the treaty a military alliance. Incidents along the Sino-Vietnamese border increased in frequency and violence. In December 1978 Vietnam invaded Cambodia, quickly ousted the Pol Pot regime, and overran the country.

China's twenty-nine-day incursion into Vietnam in February 1979 was a response to what China considered to be provocations on Hanoi's part. These included Vietnamese intimacy with the Soviet Union, mistreatment of ethnic Chinese living in Vietnam, hegemonistic "imperial dreams" in Southeast Asia, and spurning of Beijing's attempt to repatriate Chinese residents of Vietnam to China. In February 1979 China attacked along virtually the entire Sino-Vietnamese border in a brief, limited campaign that involved ground forces only. The Chinese attack came at dawn on the morning of 17 February 1979, and employed infantry, armor, and artillery. Air power was not employed then or at any time during the war. Within a day, the Chinese People's Liberation Army (PLA) had advanced some eight kilometers into Vietnam along a broad front. It then slowed and nearly stalled because of heavy Vietnamese resistance and difficulties within the Chinese supply system. On February 21, the advance resumed against Cao Bang in the far north and against the all-important regional hub of Lang Son. Chinese troops entered Cao Bang on February 27, but the city was not secured completely until March 2. Lang Son fell two days later. On March 5, the Chinese, saying Vietnam had been sufficiently chastised, announced that the campaign was over. Beijing declared its "lesson" finished and the PLA withdrawal was completed on March 16.

Hanoi's post-incursion depiction of the border war was that Beijing had sustained a military setback if not an outright defeat. Most observers doubted that China would risk another war with Vietnam in the near future. Gerald Segal, in his 1985 book Defending China, concluded that China's 1979 war against Vietnam was a complete failure: "China failed to force a Vietnamese withdrawal from [Cambodia], failed to end border clashes, failed to cast doubt on the strength of the Soviet power, failed to dispel the image of China as a paper tiger, and failed to draw the United States into an anti-Soviet coalition." Nevertheless, Bruce Elleman argued that "one of the primary diplomatic goals behind China's attack was to expose Soviet assurances of military support to Vietnam as a fraud. Seen in this light, Beijing's policy was actually a diplomatic success, since Moscow did not actively intervene, thus showing the practical limitations of the Soviet-Vietnamese military pact. ... China achieved a strategic victory by minimizing the future possibility of a two-front war against the USSR and Vietnam." After the war both China and Vietnam reorganized their border defenses. In 1986, China deployed twenty-five to twenty-eight divisions and Vietnam thirty-two divisions along their common border.

The 1979 attack confirmed Hanoi's perception of China as a threat. The PAVN high command henceforth had to assume, for planning purposes, that the Chinese might come again and might not halt in the foothills but might drive on to Hanoi. The border war strengthened Soviet-Vietnamese relations. The Soviet military role in Vietnam increased during the 1980s as the Soviets provided arms to Vietnam; moreover, Soviet ships enjoyed access to the harbors at Danang and Cam Ranh Bay, and Soviet reconnaissance aircraft operated out of Vietnamese airfields. The Vietnamese responded to the Chinese campaign by turning the districts along the China border into "iron fortresses" manned by well-equipped and well-trained paramilitary troops. In all, an estimated 600,000 troops were assigned to counter Chinese operations and to stand ready for another Chinese invasion. The precise dimensions of the frontier operations were difficult to determine, but its monetary cost to Vietnam was considerable.

By 1987, China had stationed nine armies (approximately 400,000 troops) in the Sino-Vietnamese border region, including one along the coast. It had also increased its landing craft fleet and was periodically staging amphibious landing exercises off Hainan Island, across from Vietnam, thereby demonstrating that a future attack might come from the sea. Low-level conflict continued along the Sino-Vietnamese border as each side conducted artillery shelling and probed to gain high spots in the mountainous border terrain. Border incidents increased in intensity during the rainy season, when Beijing attempted to ease Vietnamese pressure against Cambodian resistance fighters.

Since the early 1980s, China pursued what some observers described as a semi-secret campaign against Vietnam that was more than a series of border incidents and less than a limited small-scale war. The Vietnamese called it a "multifaceted war of sabotage." Hanoi officials have described the assaults as comprising steady harassment by artillery fire, intrusions on land by infantry patrols, naval intrusions, and mine planting both at sea and in the riverways. Chinese clandestine activity (the "sabotage" aspect) for the most part was directed against the ethnic minorities of the border region. According to the Hanoi press, teams of Chinese agents systematically sabotaged mountain agricultural production centers as well as lowland port, transportation, and communication facilities. Psychological warfare operations were an integral part of the campaign, as was what the Vietnamese called economic warfare—encouragement of Vietnamese villagers along the border to engage in smuggling, currency speculation, and hoarding of goods in short supply.

In recent years, both countries have pursued good relations and downplayed the years of hostility from 1979 to 1988. As a result, the Sino-Vietnamese conflict is generally not on the list of topics that may be openly mentioned in print or the media in present-day China, although veterans of the war are allowed to discuss their experiences on the Internet and correspond with their Vietnamese counterparts. On the other hand, a group of Chinese college students in 2007 discussed online plans for an invasion and conquest of Vietnam. This provoked considerable alarm in Hanoi, but the Chinese government stated that these were in no way officially sanctioned.

=== Foreign policy of 1980–1989 ===
After Ronald Reagan was elected US president in 1980, he gave a speech criticizing the Beijing government and proposing that diplomatic ties with Taiwan be restored. This aroused panic in China, and Reagan was convinced by his advisors to retract these statements. Vice President George H. W. Bush (who had been liaison officer to China from 1972 to 1978) then apologized for the president's remarks.

Despite this, Sino-US relations took a downward turn in 1981–1982. The Chinese took umbrage at Reagan's vocal anti-communism, even though it was mainly directed at the Soviet Union, as well as continued US arms sales to Taiwan. In December 1981, Premier Zhao Ziyang visited North Korea where he attacked the US troop presence on the Korean peninsula and stated that it was responsible for the continued division of the country. There were various minor squabbles such as the granting of asylum to a prominent tennis player, Hu Na, who feared persecution for refusing to join the CCP. China cancelled several educational and cultural exchange programs with the United States as a result of this episode. The US invasion of Grenada and stationing of missiles in Western Europe met with Chinese disapproval, and the two countries took opposing sides on the Falkland Islands conflict, the Palestinian question, and the presence of American troops in South Korea. By 1984, Sino-US relations had improved and President Reagan visited Beijing in April–May of that year. The trip went well, although a speech made by Reagan that promoted capitalism, democracy, and religious freedom, as well as indirect criticism of the Soviet Union, was not aired on TV in China.

In general however, China's foreign policy pronouncements were much more restrained than in the Mao era, and Beijing stated that its aim was now world peace rather than world revolution. Relations with the Soviet Union at last began to show some improvement and Foreign Minister Huang Hua led a delegation to Soviet general secretary Leonid Brezhnev's funeral in November 1982. Huang met with his counterpart Andrei Gromyko and referred to Brezhnev as an "outstanding champion of world peace". He also expressed his hope for normalized Sino-Soviet relations, but in doing so apparently moved too quickly for the Beijing government, as he was removed from office almost as soon as he returned home (he had a history of making public statements that were at odds with official policy). On the state level, Sino-Soviet relations did improve during the 1980s. Trade and cultural exchanges grew substantially, but there was no indication of improved ties on the party level and no sign that the CCP was willing to treat the CPSU as an equal. Nagging foreign policy problems remained such as the presence of Soviet troops and nuclear missiles in Mongolia, as well as continued Soviet support for Vietnam and its occupation of Cambodia.

=== Economic Reform and Opening up ===
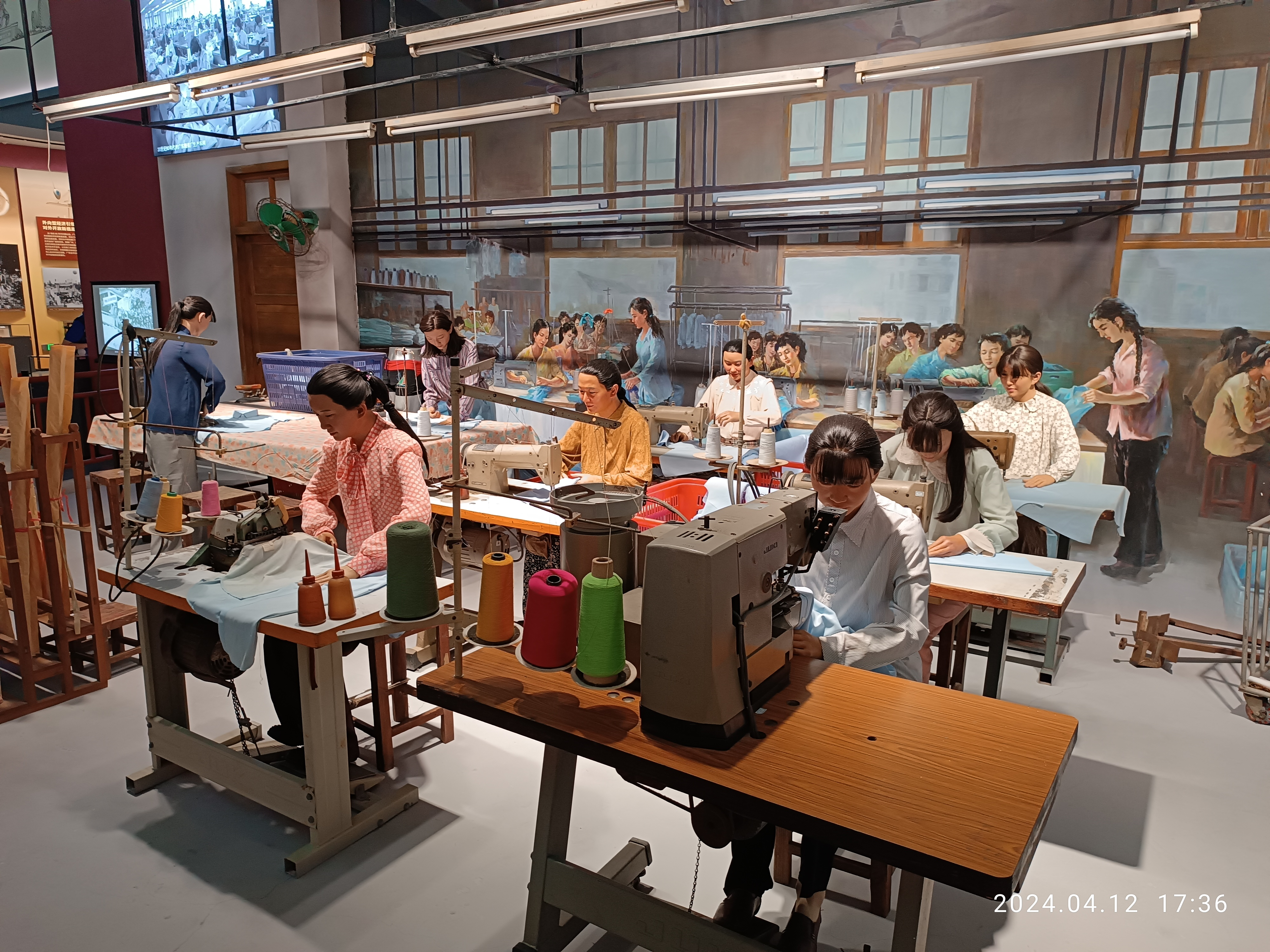
Model of a textile shop floor at an exhibition at Shenzhen Museum of Contemporary Art and Urban Planning commemorating Shenzhen's history in the reform process

The new, pragmatic leadership emphasized economic development and renounced mass political movements. At the pivotal Third Plenum of the 11th CCP Congress, completed on 22 December 1978, the leadership adopted economic reform policies known as the Four Modernizations. These tenets aimed at expanding rural income and incentives, encouraging experiments in enterprise autonomy, reducing central planning, and establishing direct foreign investment in mainland China. The Plenum also decided to accelerate the pace of legal reform, culminating in the passage of several new legal codes by the National People's Congress in June 1979.

The goals of Deng's reforms were summed up by the Four Modernizations: the modernization of agriculture, industry, science and technology, as well as the military. The strategy for achieving these aims, all of which were designed to help China become a modern, industrial nation, was "socialism with Chinese characteristics". It opened a new era in Chinese history known as reform and opening up.

The ten-year plan drafted by Hua Guofeng in 1978 was quickly abandoned on the grounds that China had neither the budget or the technical expertise to carry it out. Instead, a more modest five-year plan was adopted that emphasized light industry and consumer production.

In September 1982, the 12th Party Congress convened in Beijing. The United States and the Soviet Union were again criticized for imperialism and unification with Taiwan stressed. Most importantly, another new constitution was adopted in place of the 1978 document. This version (which remains China's constitution to the present day) emphasized foreign assistance in modernizing and developing the country, thus rejecting the Maoist self-reliance of the 1975 and 1978 constitutions. The last remaining references to the Cultural Revolution were also removed. Instead, the 1982 constitution stated that the "exploiter" class had been eliminated in China and so class struggle was no longer a relevant issue. Personality cults were also officially denounced at the 12th Congress.

However, these changes were not managed without overcoming opposition in the party, bureaucracy, and military. There were still a few extremist followers of the Gang of Four, but not many and efforts were made to weed them from the party. There did exist a large number of Stalinists who believed in orthodox central planning, and socio-political conformity. This group generally wanted to return to the ways of the 1950s and restore ties with the Soviet Union, believing that the communist world was China's natural friend. In particular, many of the Stalinists thought that Deng Xiaoping was moving too far in dismantling Mao's legacy and allowing greater freedom of expression. The largest number of them were in the military, which complained about having its budget cut from 10% of China's total GDP in 1978 to 5% by 1982. Several weapons projects that had been in the works during the '70s were dropped due to being too expensive and unnecessary and generals also objected at being asked to produce consumer goods (a common practice in the Soviet Union) instead of receiving badly needed defense modernization. Deng stressed the need for military obedience to party directives, reminding them of Mao's dictum that "The party must control the gun, but the gun must never be allowed to control the party." A higher degree of professionalism was emphasized in the PLA during the 1980s and the system of ranks that had been abolished in 1965 was slowly restored. On National Day (October 1) 1984, China staged its first military parade since 1959 to celebrate the 35th anniversary of the People's Republic of China. These parades had been held every year during the 1950s, then called off due to cost reasons. The 1984 event however showed the relative backwardness of China's armed forces, which had only recently reached the technological level of the Soviet Union 25 years earlier. In 1985, Yeh Jianyang and several other elderly party leaders agreed to retire.

Deng argued that China was in the primary stage of socialism and that the duty of the party was to perfect "socialism with Chinese characteristics." This interpretation of Chinese Marxism reduced the role of ideology in economic decision-making and emphasized policies that had been proven to be empirically effective, stressing the need to "seek truth from facts". Rejecting Mao's idealistic, communitarian values but not necessarily the values of Marx and Lenin, Deng emphasized that socialism did not mean shared poverty (thus repudiating the Gang of Four's slogan "We would rather be poor under socialism than rich under capitalism.") Unlike Hua Guofeng, Deng believed that no policy should be rejected out of hand simply because it had not been associated with Mao. Unlike more conservative leaders such as Chen Yun, Deng did not object to policies on the grounds that they were similar to those found in capitalist nations. He merely stated that these ideas were part of the common heritage of mankind and not specifically tied to either capitalism or socialism.

Although Deng provided the theoretical background and the political support to allow economic reform to occur, few of the economic reforms that Deng introduced were originated by Deng himself. Local leaders, often in violation of central government directives introduced many reforms. If successful and promising, these reforms would be adopted by larger and larger areas, and ultimately introduced nationally. Many other reforms were influenced by the experiences of the East Asian Tigers. Among other things, it was now being admitted that Taiwan's per-capita GDP was three times that of the mainland.

This is in sharp contrast to the economic restructuring, or perestroika, undertaken by Soviet general secretary Mikhail Gorbachev, in which Gorbachev himself originated most of the major reforms. Many economists have argued that the bottom-up approach of Deng's reforms, in contrast to the top-down approach of Perestroika, was a key factor in his success. In a 1985 interview with Frank Gibney of Encyclopædia Britannica, Deng remarked that the Soviet system suffered from an inflexibility and rigidness that did not affect China.

Contrary to popular misconceptions, Deng's reforms included introduction of planned, centralized management of the macro-economy by technically proficient bureaucrats, abandoning Mao's mass campaign style of economic construction. However, unlike the Soviet model or China under Mao, this management was indirect, through market mechanisms, and much of it was modeled after economic planning and control mechanisms in Western nations.

This trend did not impede the general move toward the market at the microeconomic level. Deng sustained Mao's legacy to the extent that he stressed the primacy of agricultural output and encouraged a significant decentralization of decision-making in the rural economy teams and individual peasant households. At the local level, material incentives rather than political appeals were to be used to motivate the labor force, including allowing peasants to earn extra income by selling the produce of their private plots on the free market. In the main move toward market allocation, local municipalities and provinces were allowed to invest in industries that they considered most profitable, which encouraged investment in light manufacturing. Thus, Deng's reforms shifted China's development strategy to emphasize light industry and export-led growth.

Light industrial output was vital for a developing country that was working with relatively little capital. With its short gestation period, low capital requirements, and high foreign exchange export earnings, the revenues that the light-manufacturing sector generated could be reinvested in more technologically advanced production and further capital expenditures and investments. However, these investments were not government-mandated, in sharp contrast to the similar but much less successful reforms in Yugoslavia and Hungary. The capital invested in heavy industry largely came from the banking system, and most of that capital came from consumer deposits. One of the first items of the Deng reforms was to prevent reallocation of profits except through taxation or through the banking system; hence, the reallocation in more "advanced" industries was somewhat indirect. In short, Deng's reforms sparked an industrial revolution in China.

These reforms were a reversal of the Maoist policy of autarky and economic self-reliance. The PRC decided to accelerate the modernization process by stepping up the volume of foreign trade, especially the purchase of machinery from Japan and the West. By participating in such export-led growth, the PRC was able to step up the Four Modernizations by taking advantage of foreign funds, markets, advanced technologies, and management experience. Deng also attracted foreign companies to a series of Special Economic Zones, where capitalist business practices were encouraged.

Another important focus of the reforms was the need to improve labor productivity. New material incentives and bonus systems were introduced. Rural markets selling peasants' homegrown products and the surplus products of communes were revived. Not only did rural markets increase agricultural output, they stimulated industrial development as well. With peasants able to sell surplus agricultural yields on the open market, domestic consumption stimulated industrialization, and also created political support for more difficult economic reforms.

Deng's market socialism, especially in its early stages, was in some ways parallel to Lenin's New Economic Policy and Bukharin's economic policies, in that they all foresaw a role for private entrepreneurs and markets based on trade and pricing rather than government mandates of production. An interesting anecdotal episode on this note is the first meeting between Deng and Armand Hammer. Deng pressed the industrialist and former investor in Lenin's Soviet Union for as much information on the NEP as possible.

Concurrent with economic reforms, China began a major crackdown on crime in what became known as "Strike Hard" campaigns. These have been launched periodically up to the present day and are typically accompanied by the liberal use of capital punishment and occasionally even mass executions. This stands in contrast to the Mao era, where executions were relatively rare after the CCP's consolidation of power during 1950-52 and criminals were generally punished with labor reform and political reeducation.

== Tiananmen Square protests ==
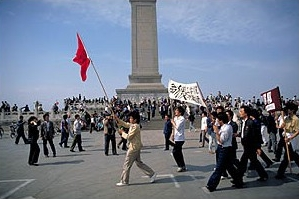
Protestors in Tiananmen Square on 2 June 1989

At the same time, political dissent as well as social problems, including inflation, political corruption, massive urban migration, and prostitution emerged. The 1980s saw a surge in intellectual material as the country emerged from the conformity of the Cultural Revolution; the time period between 1982 and 1989 saw freedom of the press like never before, and has since then never been seen again. Two prominent schools of thought emerged. One school composed of students and intellectuals who urged greater economic and political reforms; the other, composed of revolutionary party elders, became increasingly skeptical on the pace and the ultimate goals of the reform program, as it deviated from the intended direction of the Communist Party.

Hard-liners in the party and especially the military stated that "art and literature must serve politics", while moderates were willing to tolerate apolitical material. Nonetheless, writers and artists were still told that their primary job was to "educate the people to believe in socialism". As such, the party took a stand against certain Western ideas and philosophies, as well as abstract theories of human nature. Highly personal poetry and discussions of the subconscious were viewed as representing an "unhealthy" tendency. Officials also took a stand against pornography, which was being imported from Hong Kong in large quantities. This was coming at a time when many young people were skeptical of the party's leadership and increasingly questioning whether it was really possible to achieve socialism or if doing so was desirable. Nonetheless, the authorities tolerated Zhao Cuan's play Marx In London which was compatible with official viewpoints in that it presented the communist founding father as a mortal man who lived in a different age and whose theories could not provide the answers for all of China's present-day problems. On the other hand, the writer Liu Binyan, who had been in and out of favor since 1957, was criticized for his novel A Different Kind Of Loyalty which suggested that the Communist Party was not infallible, nor should it be followed without question.

In late 1983, there appeared to be a brief revival of the Cultural Revolution when, after a speech by Deng Xiaoping condemning "spiritual contamination", the "Anti-Spiritual Pollution Campaign" was launched. Pornography and unacceptable writings were confiscated, people with Western hairstyles were forced to cut their hair, and army units were required to sing "Socialism is Good", a venerable tune that had been banned during the Cultural Revolution for "keeping the people too quiet." However, Deng Xiaoping rather quickly halted the campaign.

During the 1980s, religious freedom was restored in China after having been virtually outlawed in 1966–1976. The state restored de facto recognition of five official faiths, Protestantism, Catholicism, Islam, Buddhism, and Taoism. Houses of worship were permitted to operate with a license and under the condition that they not oppose the party and socialism. This religious settlement remains in China to the present day.

In December 1986, student demonstrators, taking advantage of the loosening political atmosphere, staged protests against the slow pace of reform, confirming party elders' fears that the current reform program was leading to a kind of social instability, the same kind that killed hundreds of millions between the years of the Opium War and the founding of the PRC. Inspired by Fang Lizhi, a physicist from the University of Science and Technology of China who gave speeches criticizing Deng's go slow policies, students took to protest. The students were also disenchanted with the amount of control the government exerted, citing compulsory calisthenics and not being allowed to dance at rock concerts. Students called for campus elections, the chance to study abroad, and greater availability of western pop culture. Hu Yaobang, a protégé of Deng and a leading advocate of reform, was blamed for the protests and forced to resign as the CCP General Secretary in January 1987. In the "Anti Bourgeois Liberalization Campaign", Hu would be further denounced. Premier Zhao Ziyang was made General Secretary and Li Peng, a staunch conservative who was unpopular with the masses, formerly Vice Premier and Minister of Electric Power and Water Conservancy, was made Premier.

At the 13th Party Congress of the CCP in October–November 1987, Deng Xiaoping and remaining Party elders formally stepped down from power. This included a number of hard-liner Maoists who had resisted Deng's policies, including Chen Yun and Li Xiannan. The new leadership of the Central Committee averaged 5.5 years younger, and more than 70% were college educated. However, even with the retirement of the aged Long March veterans, they still retained considerable political pull behind the scenes, and one complaint of the student demonstrators in 1989 was the continued political influence exerted by party officials who were supposed to be retired. It was speculated that the appointment of Li Peng, a known political hardliner, as premier was a concession to Deng Xiaoping's opponents. The major policy declaration of the 13th Congress was formal endorsement of "market" socialism and that it was necessary to "adapt the principles of socialism to fit reality rather than bend reality to fit ideology."

As a further move away from the past, in 1988 the party decided that portraits of Marx, Engels, Lenin, and Stalin would no longer be displayed in Tiananmen Square on national holidays, only portraits of Mao and Sun Yat-sen.

After Zhao became the party General Secretary, the economic and political reforms he had championed came under increasing attack from his colleagues. His proposal in May 1988 to accelerate price reform led to widespread popular complaints about rampant inflation and gave opponents of rapid reform the opening to call for greater centralization of economic controls and stricter prohibitions against Western influence. This precipitated a political debate, which grew more heated through the winter of 1988–1989. With demands for political reforms growing, Deng Xiaoping merely reiterated that the Communist Party was necessary to provide stable leadership and economic development and that "China is not ready for democracy. If we were to hold elections tomorrow, the country would be plunged into a civil war."

The death of Hu Yaobang on April 15, 1989, coupled with growing economic hardship caused by high inflation and other social factors, provided the backdrop for a large-scale protest movement by students, intellectuals, and other parts of a disaffected urban population. University students and other citizens in Beijing camped out at Tiananmen Square to mourn Hu's death and to protest against those who would slow reform. Their protests, which grew despite government efforts to contain them, although not strictly anti-Government in nature, called for an end to official corruption and for the defense of freedoms guaranteed by the Constitution of the People's Republic of China. Protests also spread through many other cities, including Shanghai, Guangzhou, and Chengdu.

On April 26, the central leadership, under Deng Xiaoping, issued the 4-26 Editorial on People's Daily, which was subsequently broadcast on national media, denouncing all recent actions of protest as a form of "turmoil" (动乱). The editorial was the first in a series of events in an effort to contain the escalating protests through forceful measures. Thereafter, Deng's actions caused the presidency to have much greater power than originally intended. Various leaders sympathetic to the students, most notably Wan Li, then the NPC Chairman with a degree of constitutional powers to prevent full military action, were placed under house arrest after landing in Beijing. Wan's seclusion ensured that Premier Li Peng was able, in cooperation with Deng, then-head of the Central Military Commission, to use the office of the Premier to declare martial law in Beijing and order the military crackdown of the protests. This was in direct opposition to the wishes of the Party General Secretary Zhao Ziyang and other members of the Politburo Standing Committee.

Martial law was declared on May 20, 1989. Late on June 3 and early on the morning of June 4, a date now synonymous with the movement in the Chinese language, military units were called from neighboring provinces and brought into Beijing. Armed force was used to clear demonstrators from the streets. Official PRC estimates place the number of deaths at between two and three hundred, whilst groups such as the Red Cross believe the number to be in the two to three thousand range.

After the protests, the Chinese government faced hordes of criticism from foreign governments for the suppression of the protests, the government reined in remaining sources of dissent that were a threat to order and stability, detained large numbers of protesters, and required political re-education not only for students but also for insubordinate party cadre and government officials. Zhao Ziyang would be placed under house arrest until his death some 16 years later, and due to the subject still being largely taboo in China, Zhao has not yet been politically rehabilitated.

== One Child Policy ==
In 1979, the Chinese government instituted a one child policy to try to control its rapidly increasing population. The government had already enacted an aggressive family planning policy and fertility rates were already dropping sharply. Simultaneously there were major market-oriented economic reforms, which launched very rapid growth and migration to cities, which also reduced fertility. The policy was highly controversial in rural areas (where children were an asset in farm work) and interfered with the strong demand for sons. It helped solve the problem of famine, but by 2010 was leading to a major demographic disaster, with too many old retired people supported by too few workers. China returned to a two-child policy in 2015, then to a three-child policy in 2021, and finally abolished any limit later that year. Controversies are ongoing.

== See also ==
- List of vice premiers of the People's Republic of China
