= Arrest and trial of Chen Ziming and Wang Juntao =

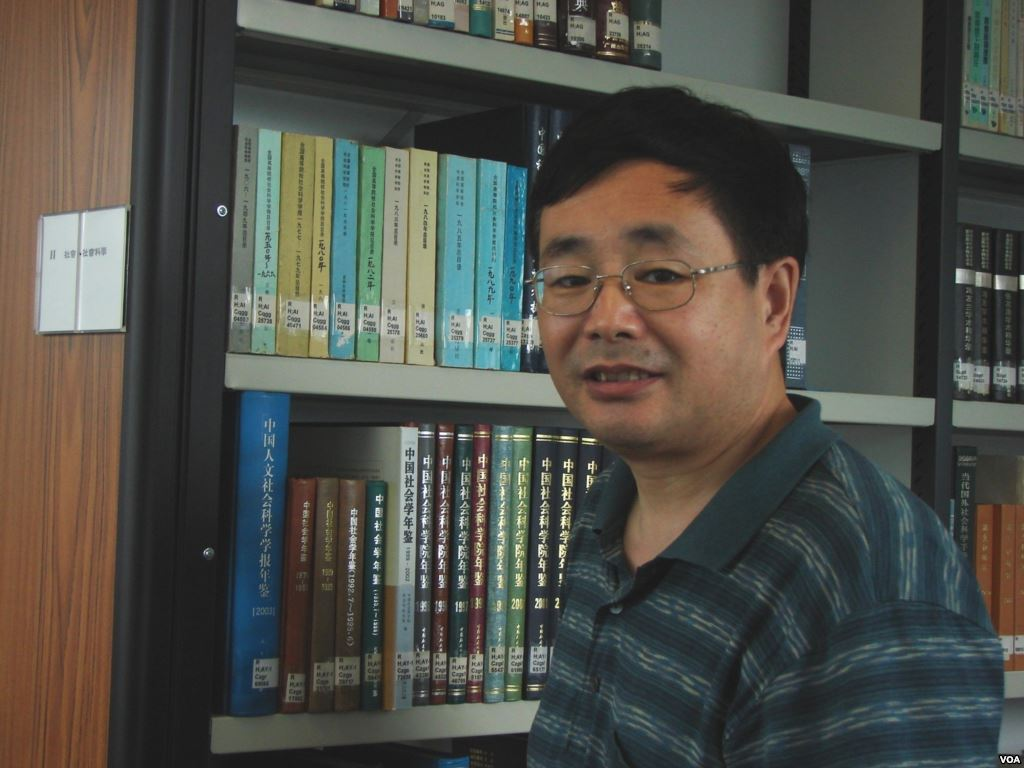
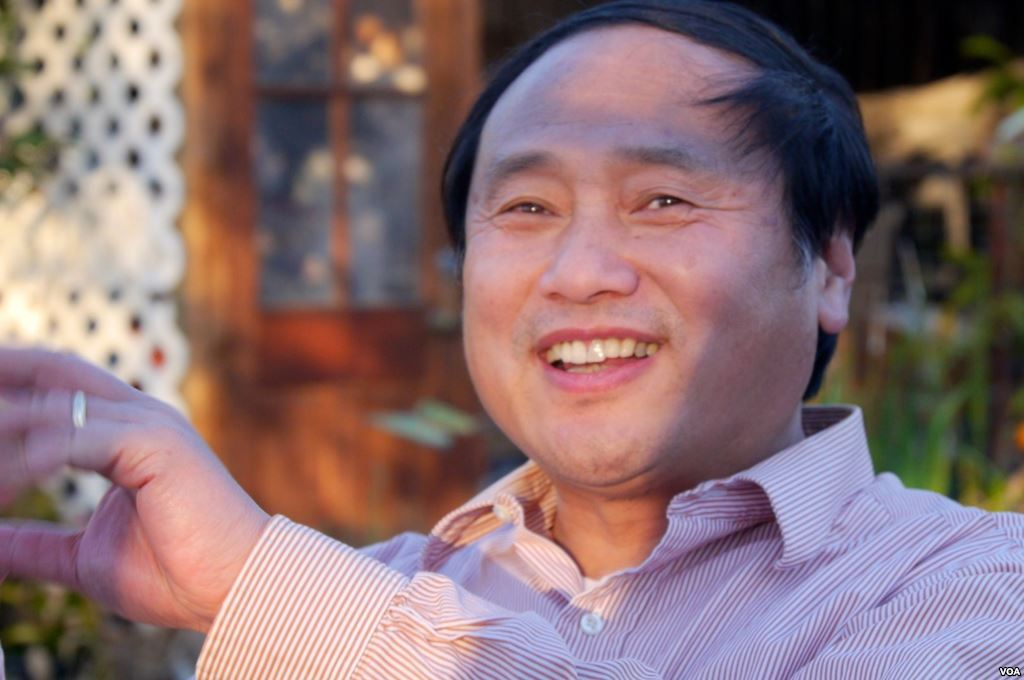
Chen Ziming and Wang Juntao in 2013

Chen Ziming (8 January 1952 – 21 October 2014) and Wang Juntao were arrested in late 1989 for their involvement in the 1989 Tiananmen Square protests and massacre. Chinese authorities alleged they were the "black hands" behind the movement. Both Chen and Wang rejected the allegations made against them. They were put on trial in 1990 and sentenced to 13 years in prison.

== History of protest ==
Before their arrest for the 1989 Tiananmen Square protests, Chen and Wang were arrested for their involvement in the 1976 protests marking the death of Zhou Enlai. They were released however, after Deng Xiaoping took power and reversed the verdict on the incident. Chen and Wang were also active in the Democracy Wall movement in 1978–1979. In 1985, they helped found the Beijing Social and Economic Sciences Research Institute.

== Arrest and indictment ==
In November or October 1989, Chen and Wang were arrested in Southern Guangdong while trying to make their way to Guangzhou. They were allegedly following an escape route set up by an unidentified Hong Kong activist who was also arrested. It is believed that Wang spent the months after June 4th hiding in the city of Wuhan while Chen went underground in Inner Mongolia. On November 24, 1990, Wang was formally charged with intent to overthrow the Communist government and dissemination of counterrevolutionary propaganda. Chen was similarly charged on November 26, 1990. Authorities claimed that the two were the alleged masterminds or "black hands" behind the 1989 Tiananmen Square protests.

== Trial ==
On December 10, 1990, in Montreal, Canada, activists campaigned in support of Wang and Chen. One of the organizers, Wu Chunmeng, expressed concern that, with international attention focused on the Persian Gulf crisis, the fate of Chinese political prisoners would be overlooked.

According to the verdict in the Case of Chen Ziming, the Beijing Intermediate People's Court concluded the following through "facts... attested to by witnesses' testimony, by written evidence and by tape-recordings:"

- On April 23, 1989, Chen Ziming convened a meeting at the Beijing Social and Economic Sciences Research Institute where he, Wang Juntao and Chen Xiaoping "molded the counterrevolutionary opinion to intensify the turmoil in an organized way." At the meeting, Chen Xiaoping stated: "China's problem today is not a matter of reform, but a matter of changing the government."
- On May 17 and 18, Chen Ziming, Wang Juntao and Chen Xiaoping "schemed" to form an "illegal organization to 'unite all the various circles.'" At the meeting, Chen Ziming outlined his "tactic for conspiring to subvert the government" when he stated: "the words of the elite will influence the students, and words of the students will influence people throughout the country." Also read aloud at the meeting was the "May 17 Declaration" which stated that the government had "lost its capacity for human feeling", and was "under the power of an autocrat." It further characterized the 1989 Student protests as "a great patriotic and democratic movement which will finally bury autocracy and end the system of rule by emperor."
- On May 19, Chen Ziming convened a meeting where a "counterrevolutionary leaflet" was written which stated that "military rule is about to be enforced" and "incited the masses" to "begin a nationwide work strike, class boycott, and market boycott."
- On the evening of May 23, Chen Ziming and Wang Juntao summoned the leaders of the "Command Headquarters of Tiananmen Square", the "Beijing Students' Autonomous Federation", the "Beijing Workers' Autonomous Federation", the "Beijing Citizens Autonomous Federation", the "Citizens Dare-to-Die Squad", and other organizations together and founded the "Joint Liaison Group of All Circles in the Capital for the Patriotic Upholding of the Constitution."
- In mid-May, Chen Ziming sent others to print several hundred copies of a "counterrevolutionary leaflet" which called China's socialist system "politically, judicially, and journalistically dark" and "vilified" the Chinese Communist Party.
- At the end of May and beginning of June, Chen Ziming and Wang Juntao "secretly conspired to set up places where they could go into hiding."

The court ruled that "these acts constitute the crime of plotting to subvert the government and the crime of counterrevolutionary propaganda and incitement and must be punished according to law."

Wang's Defence claimed Yan Mingfu, head of the United Front Work Department of the Central Committee of the Chinese Communist Party, sent Zheng Yefu to invite Wang and others to "get involved immediately" in the movement to "serve as a bridge between the students and the government." Thus, the Defence claimed Wang Juntao and Chen Ziming involved themselves in the movement to "fulfill the task assigned to them by the party."

At his trial, Chen Ziming rejected the charges against him as "unfair and incorrect."

== Sentencing ==
On February 12, 1991, both Chen Ziming and Wang Juntao were sentenced to 13 years in prison. The Xinhua News Agency stated that the two "committed very serious crimes but have so far shown no willingness to repent." By comparison, Liu Gang, convicted of subversion, and Chen Xiaoping, convicted on the same charges as Wang and Chen Ziming, received more lenient sentences. Liu received six years because, according to the Xinhua News Agency, "he acknowledged his crimes and showed willingness to repent." Chen Xiaoping was released "for voluntarily giving himself up to police and showing willingness to repent", according to the news agency.

Others have offered different reasons for the discrepancy in sentencing. Merle Goldman, a Boston University professor of Chinese history, argued that Wang and Chen "represent a new revolutionary class in China, and that is why the regime is so worried about them." A Western diplomat argues that the Chinese government "needed somebody to blame for millions of people marching on the streets, and in public it's come down to blaming these two guys." Andrew Higgins, a reporter covering the trial, suggested the importance of the trial was not the sentence but the verdict, which served "to show that the People's Liberation Army crushed not a popular revolt but a planned conspiracy."

Beijing Higher People's Court later rejected appeals of the three sentences.

== Wang's letter of criticism ==
After the trial, in a letter smuggled out of prison, Wang criticized both his trial and the response of fellow protesters. About his trial he stated:

As a matter of general principle I find it absolutely impermissible and insupportable that the charge of "viciously attacking" [the party] should once again be used in our republic, as a means of denying and repudiating the lawful rights of citizens. So when the public prosecutor accused me, on the grounds merely that I had opposed the leadership, of committing the crime of counterrevolution, I became very angry. I could not just limit my defense to saying, "I do not oppose the leadership", and felt obliged to defend instead "the lawful right to oppose the leadership."

Of his fellow protesters he stated:

"It grieves me to see that, when confronted with the consequences, so many of the leaders and initiators of this movement dared not take responsibility for it and sought to defame it.... In this way [they] can suffer less pain themselves, but what of the dead, lacking any way to defend themselves [and] cannot rest in peace?"

== Release and re-imprisonment ==
On April 23, 1994, the Chinese Government released Wang Juntao and allowed him to travel to New York City on medical parole. The release came five weeks before the US decided whether to renew China's most favoured nation trading status.

On May 14, 1994, Chen Ziming was released on medical parole. In June 1995, he was placed under house arrest and then later returned to prison. Chen was again released on medical parole in November 1996, two weeks prior to a visit by US Secretary of State Warren Christopher. He remained under strict house arrest until 2002 when his sentence ended.

== Renovation and Construction ==
Renovation and Construction whose domain name was bjsjs.net, was a website founded by Chen Ziming and He Jiadong on February 1, 2004. Renovation and Construction was the website of Beijing Institute of Social and Economic Sciences, and its legal representative was He Jiadong. In August 2005, Renovation and Construction was censored in less than two hours after it published the article A Strong Nation Cannot Eat Its Own Children in the headline position.

== Death ==
Chen died on 21 October 2014 at the age of 62, from pancreatic cancer.
