= Fu Yuehua =

Chinese Tiananmen Square protestor (born 1945)

Fu Yuehua (Chinese: 傅月華; born c. 1945) was a Chinese construction worker and dissident who participated in the Democracy Wall Movement. She was detained after helping organize a demonstration in Tiananmen Square in 1979 and charged with violating public order and libel, for alleging that she was raped by a Communist Party official. She was sentenced to two years in prison.

== Early life and work ==
Fu Yuehua was born in China around 1945. She completed middle school, but was not assigned to work in the countryside. Her family lived in Beijing.

In 1972, Fu was hired by the district's street service bureau in the Xuanwu District, working for a construction company. Fu alleged that Geng Yutian, a secretary of the Communist Party and her boss at the company, had raped her when she worked there in 1972. She made a formal accusation of rape in 1973, but the case was dismissed. She was fired from her job in 1974 and was unable to find employment elsewhere.

== Democracy Wall arrest and detention ==
Fu was in the process of visiting offices to present her case in late 1978 when she met members of peasant families who had gathered in Beijing to air their grievances. She became involved with the people, helping them locate proper departments to file their complaints and accompanying them to their appointments. If their appeals went unanswered, she would a create poster for their case that she would post on the Democracy Wall.

Fu helped to organize a protest of peasants in Tiananmen Square on 8 January 1979, the anniversary of the death of Zhou Enlai. The demonstration, calling for improved living conditions, disrupted traffic for one hour. Fu marched in the demonstration holding a bedsheet carrying the message "Against hunger, against persecution and for democracy, for human rights." Later in the evening she attended a public meeting where the Human Rights Alliance's manifesto was read.

Fu was arrested at her home on Niu Street on 18 January 1979 by six plainclothes officers from the public security bureau who tied her up. She was the first activist to be arrested during the Democracy Wall Movement. At a protest against the arrest of Fu in January 1979, a dissident said that "without the freedom to criticize... the Constitution is nothing but a scrap of paper". She was held for two and a half months before being charged in April. Several articles were published about her case in unofficial newspapers. A journalist from Exploration magazine said that police had tortured her while she was incarcerated and that had to be transferred by stretcher to another prison. In April, she was charged with violating public order and libel, for making a false rape accusation against a Communist Party official. According to the New York Times, Fu "was secretly tried and convicted, had her conviction overturned by a higher court, and then was tried twice more, each time on slightly different charges".

Fu's trial, on 17 October, came one day after the trial of human rights activist Wei Jingsheng, who had posted the essay "The Fifth Modernization" on the Democracy Wall in the previous December. He received a 15-year sentence. At her trial, her description of her rape "so moved the court that there was a spontaneous eruption from the spectators". One report indicated that an older party member stood up at one point to call a witness for the prosecution a "hooligan". Fu raised questions during her final summation that caused the judge to call for a recess to allow for further time to "check up on certain facts and evidence, in accordance with the principle of not wronging the innocent and not letting the guilt go free".

In December, the intermediate people's court in Beijing found Fu guilty of violating public order and sentenced her to two years in prison, declaring her "morally degenerate". Her family was denied visitation rights.
