= Jingsheng =

Jingsheng could refer to:

- Cong Jingsheng (Chinese: 丛京生), Chinese-American computer scientist and entrepreneur
- Liu Jingsheng (Chinese: 刘京生; born c. 1950), Chinese activist
- Wei Jingsheng (Chinese: 魏京生; born 1950), Chinese activist
- Zeng Jingsheng (Chinese: 曾景生; born 1954), Chinese oil painter
- Zhang Jingsheng (Chinese: 張競生; 1888–1970), Chinese philosopher and sexologist
- Zhang Jingsheng (singer-songwriter) (Chinese: 张京生), Chinese singer-songwriter
