= Tiananmen (disambiguation) =

The Tiananmen, or Gate of Heavenly Peace, is the main entrance to the Imperial Palace Grounds in Beijing.

Tiananmen or Gate of Heavenly Peace may also refer to:

- Tiananmen Square
- Tiananmen Square protests, including:
  - 1976 Tiananmen Incident – the Tiananmen Square protests of 4–5 April 1976
  - 1989 Tiananmen Square protests and massacre (also known as Tiananmen Massacre)
- The Gate of Heavenly Peace (film), a documentary about the protests
- Tiananmen (film), a 2009 Chinese film
- The Gate of Heavenly Peace (book), by Jonathan D. Spence, about the revolutionary history of China
- Tianmen Mountain, a mountain range in Hunan Province, China
