= List of pro-democracy protests in China =

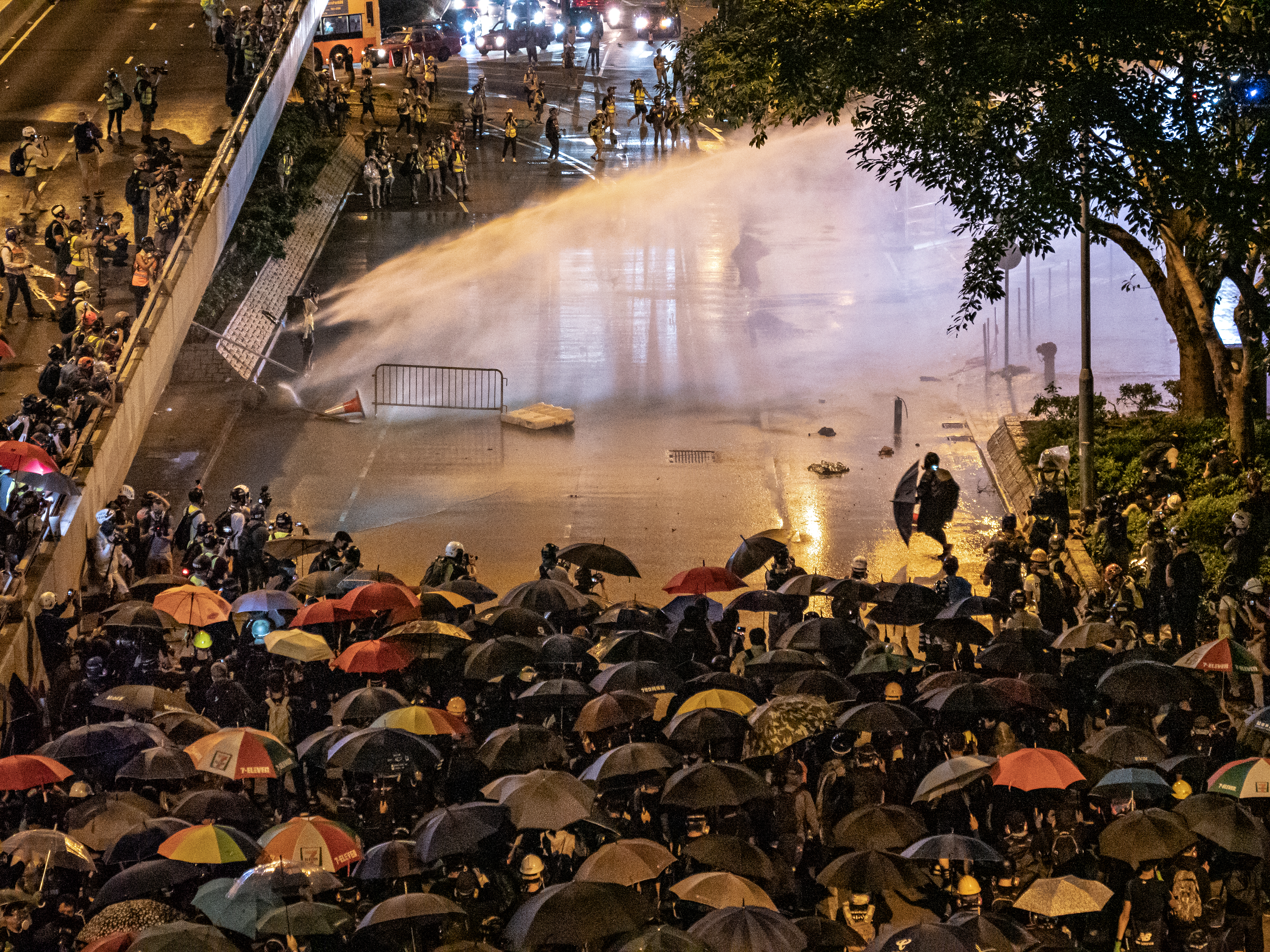
Umbrella Movement anniversary in 2019

This is a list of pro-democracy protests in China which have occurred at various times in the history of the People's Republic of China, often calling for political reform, freedom of expression, government accountability, and democratic representation through elections.

== List ==
Protest	Date(s)	Location(s)	Notes
Democracy Wall movement	1978–1979	Beijing	Early reform-era movement advocating political liberalization and criticism of bureaucratic rule.
1986 Chinese student demonstrations	1986–1987	Multiple cities	Student protests calling for democratic reforms and political openness.
1989 Tiananmen Square protests and massacre	April–June 1989	Beijing and other cities	Nationwide student-led demonstrations demanding democracy and anti-corruption measures; violently suppressed by the government.
Hong Kong 1 July marches	Various years (since 1997)	Hong Kong	Annual pro-democracy demonstrations marking the anniversary of the handover of Hong Kong, often calling for universal suffrage, government accountability, and protection of civil liberties.
2005 protest for democracy in Hong Kong	December 2005	Hong Kong	Large demonstration demanding universal suffrage and opposing proposed electoral reform limitations.
2010 Hong Kong democracy protests	2010	Hong Kong	Pro-democracy demonstrations connected to the Five Constituencies Referendum movement advocating universal suffrage and political reform.
2011 Chinese pro-democracy protests	February–March 2011	Multiple cities	Inspired by the Arab Spring Tunisian revolution, small demonstrations advocating democratic reform occurred in over a dozen cities.
Wukan protests	2011	Wukan, Guangdong	Village protests over governance and land issues resulted in temporary local elections seen as a democratic experiment.
Hong Kong new year marches	Various years	Hong Kong	Annual pro-democracy demonstrations advocating political reform and civil liberties.
2014 Hong Kong protests	September–December 2014	Hong Kong	Large-scale pro-democracy protests including Occupy Central with Love and Peace and the Umbrella Movement, in response to 2014–2015 Hong Kong electoral reform.
2019–2020 Hong Kong protests	2019–2020	Hong Kong	Large-scale protests initially against 2019 Hong Kong extradition bill that expanded into a broader pro-democracy movement calling for political reform and police accountability.
2022 Beijing Sitong Bridge protest	13 October 2022	Beijing	Solo protest featuring banners opposing authoritarianism and calling for political change.
2022 COVID-19 protests in China	November–December 2022	Multiple cities	Demonstrations initially against lockdown policies that included broader calls for freedom of expression and political reform.
2025 Chongqing anti-CCP protest	2025	Chongqing	Demonstration criticizing Chinese Communist Party rule and advocating political change.

== Pro-democracy organizations ==
- Chinese Alliance for Democracy
- Civil Human Rights Front
- Democracy Party of China
- Federation for a Democratic China
- Hong Kong Alliance in Support of Patriotic Democratic Movements of China
- Independent Federation of Chinese Students and Scholars
- New Citizens' Movement
- Open Constitution Initiative

== See also ==
- Barefoot lawyer
- Censorship in China
- Chinese protests
- Democracy in China
- Democracy and Republic
- Democratic republic
- Democracy in Hong Kong
- Democracy movements of China
- History of China (1976–1989)
- Human rights in China
- List of forms of government
- List of Chinese pro-democracy activists
- Protest and dissent in China
