= Democracy movements in China =

Series of political movements in China

Throughout the history of the People's Republic of China, there have been a series of organized democracy movements, inside and outside of the country, addressing a variety of grievances, including objections to socialist bureaucratism and objections to the continuation of the one-party rule of the Chinese Communist Party (CCP) itself. The Democracy Wall movement of November 1978 to spring 1981 is typically regarded as the beginning of contemporary Chinese democracy movement. In addition to the Democracy Wall movement, the events of the 1989 Tiananmen Square protests and massacre are among the notable examples of Chinese democracy movements.

== History ==
=== Origin ===
The beginning of China's democracy movements is usually regarded as the Democracy Wall movement of November 1978 to spring 1981. The Democracy Wall movement framed the key issue as the elimination of bureaucratism and the bureaucratic class. Former Red Guards from both rebel and conservative factions were the core of the movement. Democracy Wall participants agreed that "democracy" was the means to resolve the conflict between the bureaucratic class and the people, the nature of the proposed democratic institutions was a major source of disagreement. A majority of participants in the movement favored viewed the movement as part of a struggle between correct and incorrect notions of Marxism. Many participants advocated classical Marxist views that drew on the Paris Commune for inspiration. The Democracy Wall movement also included non-Marxists and anti-Marxists, although these participants were a minority. Demands for "democracy" were frequent but without an agreed-upon meaning. Participants in the movement variously associated the concept of democracy with socialism, communism, liberal democracy, capitalism, and Christianity. They drew on a diverse range of intellectual resources "ranging from classical Marxist and socialist traditions to Enlightenment philosophers, [socialist] experiments in Yugoslavia, and Western liberal democracy."

Significant documents of the Democracy Wall Movement include The Fifth Modernization manifesto by Wei Jingsheng, who was sentenced to fifteen years in prison for authoring the document. In it, Wei argued that political liberalization and the empowerment of the laboring masses was essential for modernization, that the CCP was controlled by reactionaries and that the people must struggle to overthrow the reactionaries via a long and possibly bloody fight.

=== Development ===
Throughout the 1980s, these ideas increased in popularity among college-educated Chinese, through the "New Enlightenment movement" led by intellectuals. Overseas pro-democracy organizations including the Chinese Alliance for Democracy were founded by Chinese activists. Student protests inspired by intellectuals broke out in 1986.

In the wake of growing corruption and economic dislocation, the Tiananmen Square protests erupted in 1989, which culminated in a military crackdown in June.

== Government's response ==
Narratives of a CCP-style democracy have evolved in CCP's language since its founding. The Constitution of China refers to the state as a people's democratic dictatorship, a term rooted in Mao Zedong's concept of "New Democracy" formulated during the Chinese Civil War. During the general secretaryship of Xi Jinping, the CCP has utilized the term whole-process people's democracy to describe the PRC.

== Academic interpretations ==
Academic Lin Chun criticizes the phrase "democracy movement" as typically used in the scholarly and media discourse on China, noting that the term is often used exclusively to refer to the "demands and activism of an urban, educated group of people seeking liberal more than democratic values". She notes, for example, that the political turbulence in universities over the period 1986 to 1989 had specific flash points ranging from anger at the government's "too soft" position on China–Japan relations to poor management of student welfare.

== See also ==
- Protest and dissent in China
- Liberalism in China
- List of pro-democracy protests in China
