= Chinese protests =

Chinese protests may refer to the following protests:

- 1025 rally to safeguard Taiwan
- 1989 Tiananmen Square protests and massacre
- 2005 anti-Japanese demonstrations
- 2008 Tibetan unrest
- 2010 Chinese labour unrest
- Any of the protests in China in 2011
- Boxer Rebellion
- Dongzhou protests
- List of pro-democracy protests in China
- May 4th movement
- Nanjing anti-African protests
- Tiananmen Square protests (disambiguation)
- Xinhai revolution
