= Chen Ziming =

Chinese democratic dissident

- 陈子明
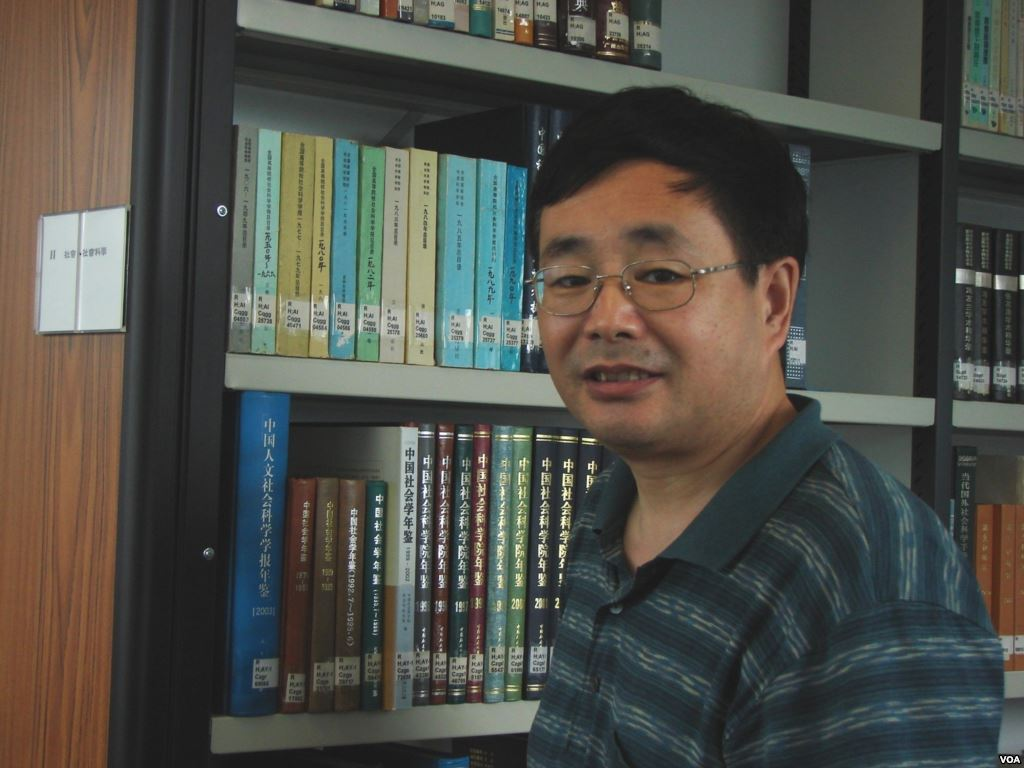
- Chen Ziming
- Born: January 8, 1952; Beijing, China
- Died: October 21, 2014 (aged 62); Beijing
- Education: Beijing University of Chemical Technology; University of Science and Technology of China
- Occupations: Political dissident; Democracy activist
- Awards: CPJ International Press Freedom Awards (1991)

Chen Ziming (Chinese: 陈子明; pinyin: Chén Zǐmíng; January 8, 1952 – October 21, 2014), pen name Wang Sirui (王思睿; Wáng Sīruì), was a Chinese dissident and columnist for Deutsche Welle. He was born in Shanghai and grew up in Beijing. He actively participated in Chinese democratic movements in the 1970s and 1980s. He was arrested and imprisoned. After his release, he was placed under residential surveillance in Beijing. He died of pancreatic cancer in Beijing in 2014.

== Life ==
=== Early life ===
Chen was born in Shanghai on January 8, 1952. After graduating from Beijing No. 8 Middle School in 1968, he went to Abaga Banner in Inner Mongolia to join the team for six years. In 1974, he studied at Beijing Institute of Chemical Technology as a worker-peasant-soldier student.

In August 1975, he was arrested after he was found to have criticized current affairs in his letters and was classified as a counter-revolutionary. On April 2, 1976, the school announced that he would be expelled from school and from the Communist Youth League. The next day, Chen Ziming went to Tiananmen Square. On April 7, he was sent to Yongledian Farm for laogai as planned by the school, but was not arrested.

=== After the Cultural Revolution ===
In 1978, he resumed his student status and participated in the Xidan Democracy Wall Movement in Beijing. In 1979, he served as editor of Beijing Spring magazine. In 1980, he was admitted to the Graduate School of the University of Science and Technology of China and studied molecular biology at the Institute of Biophysics. He also served as the chairman of the graduate student union of the graduate school.

At the end of 1980, China directly elected National People's Congress representatives at the district and county level for the first time. Chen Ziming, Wang Juntao and others participated in the campaign for National People's Congress representatives. Chen Ziming, Hu Ping and more than ten students were elected as representatives of the Seventh National People's Congress of Haidian District, Beijing.

=== 1989 Tiananmen Square protests and massacre ===
After the 1989 Tiananmen Square protests and massacre, the Beijing Institute of Social and Economic Sciences was closed down, its staff was laid off, and the institute's assets were confiscated by the authorities. Chen Ziming was accused of being the "mastermind" and wanted. On October 10, he was arrested in Zhanjiang, Guangdong.

In 1991, the Chinese government sentenced Chen Ziming to 13 years in prison and deprived him of his political rights for four years for "counterrevolutionary incitement and conspiracy to subvert the government."

In May 1994, he was released on medical parole and was diagnosed with cancer after being released from prison. In June 1995, he was imprisoned again. In November 1996, he was released on medical parole again and placed under house arrest at home.

=== After being released ===
On October 10, 2002, he was released after serving his sentence, but was still under police surveillance.

In the early morning of December 20, 2013, his friend Wang Dan revealed on Facebook that Chen Ziming was suffering from advanced cancer and had been hospitalized. He also faced the prospect of surgery, chemotherapy, etc.

In early 2014, the Chinese authorities allowed Chen Ziming to travel to the United States for medical treatment. On the evening of January 18 of the same year, Chen Ziming and his wife Wang Zhihong arrived in Boston, United States, for medical treatment. At 2:50 pm on October 21, 2014, he died of pancreatic cancer in Beijing at the age of 62.

== See also ==
- List of Chinese pro-democracy activists
