= Democracy Wall (City University of Hong Kong) =

Free speech venue in Hong Kong

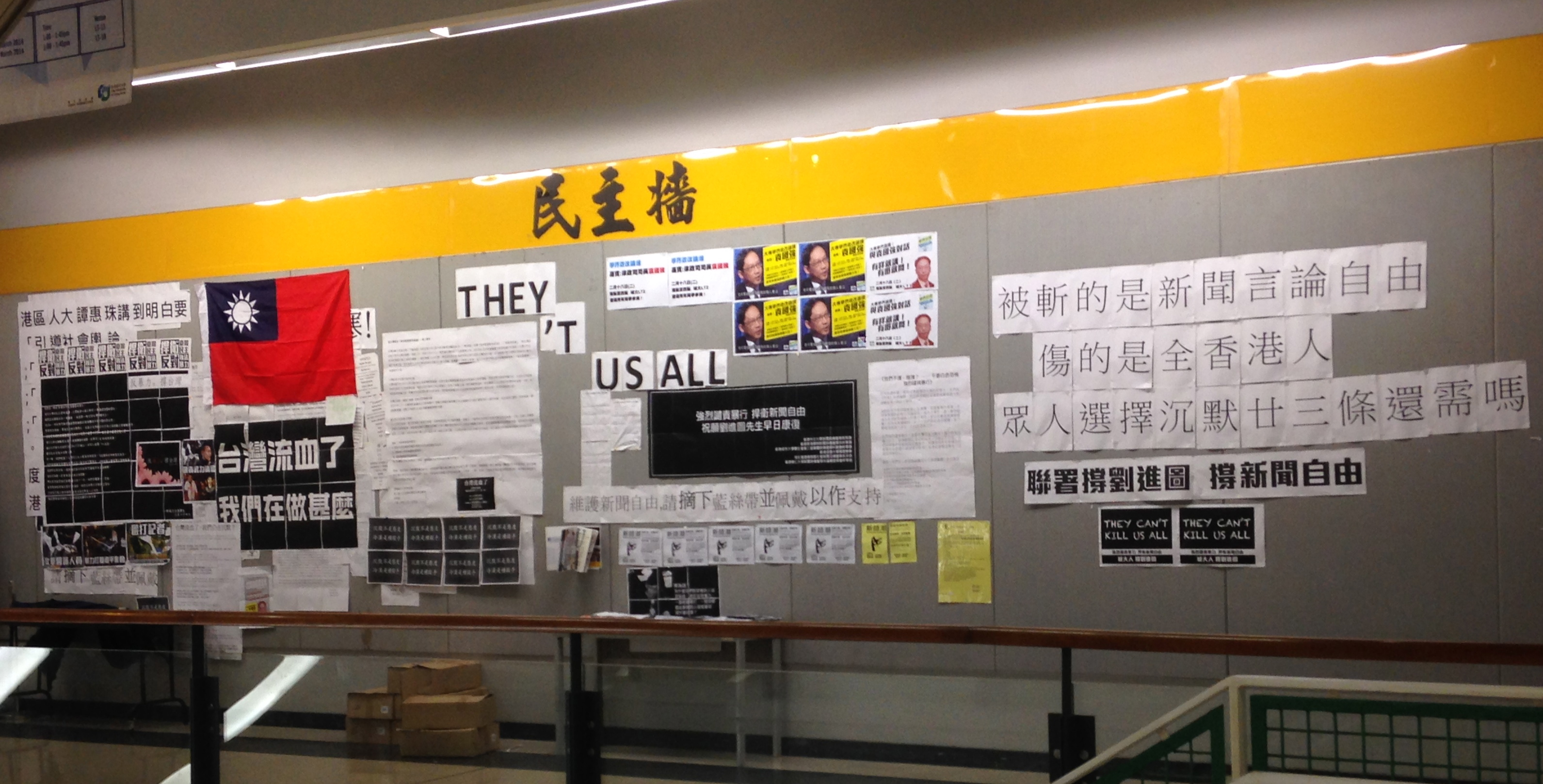
The Democracy Wall of City University of Hong Kong in March 2013

The Democracy Wall (Chinese: 民主牆) at the City University of Hong Kong is a venue for free speech. It is located on the third floor of Academic One, in a prominent position next to the university library. The original Democracy Wall, from 1978, was a focal point for democratic discourse in Beijing. It was demolished by the Communist authorities.

The Democracy Wall is a public bulletin board that allows students, alumni and teachers to freely express their personal opinions, exchange their views on school policies, political point of views or academic theories. The school will also post official responses on the wall according to some particular issues. It acts as a public forum for the university community. There are also tables in front of the wall with various leaflets and books on display, providing further information for those interested in particular issues.

There are also other Democracy Walls at other public-funded universities, including the University of Hong Kong, Chinese University of Hong Kong, and Hong Kong Polytechnic University. The famed Lennon Wall of the 2014 Hong Kong protests also played a similar role, but was removed by the government when the Admiralty protest site was cleared.

== History ==
In 2003, the Democracy Wall was moved to its present location.

== Users ==
The Democracy Wall of CityU is managed by the City University of Hong Kong Students' Union. The rules of the wall insist on equality, mutual respect, factual rather than judgemental points, and for students to take responsibility for what they put up. It is common for different societies to post declarations on the wall.

=== Staff ===
Faculty of the university are free to post posters and statements on the wall. For example, Dr.Priscilla Leung Mei-fun (Priscilla Leung), an associate professor of City University of Hong Kong School of Law, once posted a statement about the Legislative Council using Powers and Privileges to investigate the progress justice of examining the TV licence of HKTV. It is her right to post on the democracy wall. However, there are lots of critics because she used the member of legislative council but not the staff of CityU.

=== Students ===
Students are allowed to post on the wall with their student ID. The content can be anything such as posters, comments or slogan. For example, many societies or clubs of the student's union post declaration to allow the public, especially to the students of CityU to read. It is also possible for students to write comments on posted items, along with their student ID again.

== Aims ==
=== Exercise of freedom of speech in Hong Kong ===
Freedom of speech is an essential right codified in Hong Kong Basic Law. It is also considered as a core value in Hong Kong society. The Democracy Wall is a place for people to express their opinions and share their views, with an emphasis on political issues. Issues on the wall may be related to international issues as well as those related to CityU or Hong Kong society.

=== Student awareness of societal issues ===
The Democracy Wall aims to raise students’ attention towards different kinds topics and problems surrounding them. The location of the wall, next to the university library, is deliberate as to catch the eye of students passing by. The aim is to quickly let students know of different issues in CityU, Hong Kong and the world.

== Management ==
The democracy wall is owned by the Student's Union of the City University of Hong Kong, directly related to the executive committee of the Students' Union. The committee has the ability to put down the poster on the wall. Therefore, it raises a question about the fairness. If the executive committee can put down the poster when they want, the committee with different background may have a different interpretation.

== Significant incidents ==
=== Libel lawsuit ===
In 1994 a City Polytechnic law student sued an accountancy student for libel after the defendant posted two posters to the Democracy Wall that claimed the plaintiff was a criminal, biased, and dishonest. The law student had sat on an arbitration committee that ruled over a case in which the accountancy student was part of a party that felt aggrieved. The accountancy student was ordered to pay $75,000, but claimed that she had allowed a fellow student to use her student number on the posters.

=== Orientation camp conduct ===
In September 2013, there was a post on the Democracy Wall of CityU talking about one of the games in MCS orientation camps in Hong Kong torturing group leaders (students of Year 2 or above) in front of freshmen. This post was posted by a freshman who had joined the orientation camp, saying they could not accept the game they played in the camp because it was immoral: throwing noodles, water, and even leftover onto group leaders to punish the freshmen for not participating inactively in the camp. A few days later, the designer of the game posted a proclamation to clarify the meaning of the game was wanting freshmen to devote more in the camp, and only water and wetted paper were used to throw on group leaders.

=== Taiwan Anti-Cross-Strait Service Trade Agreement ===
In March 2014, there are some posts about the Anti-Cross-Strait Service Trade Agreement to China issues which are happening in Taiwan. Students compare the situation in Hong Kong and Taiwan. They express their views of supporting Taiwan citizens to against the trade pact with China of holding Sunflower Student Movement. Rather than objecting the unfair situation of a trade pact with China, this is also showing that justice is being affected. This can show the inappropriate way of the Taiwan government when handling this issue. Through the views of Hong Kong students, they are also objecting to the way of Taiwan government. CityU Democracy Wall is a way to show social justice.

=== Controversy ===
In November 2015 a Mainland Chinese exchange student tore down part of a banner reading "Hong Kong is not China" and put up new text, changing it to read "Hong Kong is just a part of China of course". She struck and injured a student who filmed her actions. The footage went viral on Facebook, with some commentators criticising the student for not respecting Hong Kong's freedom of speech, while others sympathised with the girl and said her freedom of speech should also be protected.

A male student was also seen ripping messages from the wall the same month. He was also filmed and the video uploaded to Facebook.

=== Vandalism of Goddess of Democracy statue ===
A replica of the Goddess of Democracy stands beside the Democracy Wall at City University. The original statue was erected by students at the 1989 Tiananmen Square protests in Beijing, but was destroyed by the People's Liberation Army during the massacre of the protesters on 4 June 1989.

On 23 July 2019, against the backdrop of protests against the Hong Kong government's proposal to introduce a China extradition law, a young man was filmed tearing posters from the Democracy Wall and tipping the Goddess of Democracy over. The man was confronted by CityU students and university security, who called police. The suspect was taken away in a police van. The Mandarin-speaking suspect was reportedly a mainland Chinese graduate of the university.

The statue, though badly damaged, was subsequently righted by students. The students' union, which owns the statue, said it had contacted the original artist in hopes of repairing it. The university said it would set up a committee to investigate the incident.
