= Four Modernizations =

Deng Xiaoping's campaigns to modernize China

- Traditional Chinese: 四個現代化
- Simplified Chinese: 四个现代化
Transcriptions
Standard Mandarin
- Hanyu Pinyin: sì gè xiàndàihuà
Yue: Cantonese
- Jyutping: sei3 go3 jin6 doi6 faa3

The Four Modernizations (simplified Chinese: 四个现代化; traditional Chinese: 四個現代化) were goals formally announced by China's first Premier Zhou Enlai to strengthen the fields of agriculture, industry, defense, and science and technology in China. The Four Modernizations were adopted as a means of rejuvenating China's economy in 1977, following the death of Mao Zedong, and later were among the defining features of Deng Xiaoping's tenure as the paramount leader of China. At the beginning of "Reform and Opening-up", Deng further proposed the idea of "xiaokang" or "Moderately prosperous society" in 1979.

== Summary ==
The Four Modernizations refer to modernization of agriculture, industry, science and technology, and national defense. These were viewed as essential to China's economic development.

They were introduced as early as January 1963 at the Conference on Scientific and Technological Work held in Shanghai, Zhou Enlai called for professionals in the sciences to realize "the Four Modernizations." In February 1963, at the National Conference on Agricultural Science and Technology Work, Nie Rongzhen specifically referred to the Four Modernizations as comprising agriculture, industry, national defense, and science and technology. The Cultural Revolution prevented and delayed implementation of the Four Modernizations for years. In 1975, in one of his last public acts, Zhou Enlai made another pitch for the Four Modernizations at the 4th National People's Congress. In that report, Zhou stated that China should achieve the comprehensive modernization of agriculture, industry, national defence, and science and technology before the end of the twentieth century.

After Zhou's death and Mao's soon thereafter, Hua Guofeng assumed control of the party in 1976. Hua had the leadership of the Cultural Revolution arrested. Known as the Gang of Four, their arrest marked the end of the Cultural Revolution. This event enabled the enactment of the Four Modernizations. Hua supported the Four Modernizations. By 1977 all entities in every sector and at every level of society were focused on implementing the Four Modernizations. One core tenet was the rejection of the previously long-held concept known as the "iron rice bowl".

At the opening of the national science conference in 1978, Deng stated:

The key to the four modernizations is the modernization of science and technology. Without modern science and technology, it is impossible to build modern agriculture, modern industry, or modern national defense. Without the rapid development of science and technology, there can be no rapid development of the economy.

In March 1978, Deng argued that socialist distribution should follow the principle of "to each according to his work", with pay, promotion, and bonuses tied to performance, technical level, and actual contribution. The new idea was that all workers should not be paid the same, but rather, paid according to their productivity. The thinking was that in order to be a consumer society, China would need to be a producing society.

The Four Modernizations were included in the 1978 constitution of the PRC.

In December 1978 at the 3rd plenary session of the 11th Central Committee of the Chinese Communist Party, Deng Xiaoping announced the official launch of the Four Modernizations, formally marking the beginning of the reform.

Deng described a xiaokang society as a goal of the Four Modernizations. In a 1979 discussion with Japanese Prime Minister Masayoshi Ōhira, Deng used the concept to distinguish China's path of development from other approaches, stating, "The Four Modernizations we hope to realize are a Chinese Four Modernizations. Our conceptualization of the Four Modernizations is not like your conception of modernization, but it is a xiaokang family."

Recognizing the need for technical assistance to spur this most important modernization, the Chinese Government elicited the support of the United Nations Development Programme (UNDP) in the fall of 1978 to scope out and provide financial resources for the implementation of an initial complement of targeted projects. The initial projects from 1979 to 1984 included the establishment of overseas on-the-job training and academic programs, set-up of information processing centers at key government units, and the development of methods to make informed decisions within the Chinese context based on market principles. The key advisor to the Chinese government on behalf of the UNDP was Jack Fensterstock of the United States. This first technical assistance effort (CPR/79-001) by the UNDP led to the entry of large-scale multilateral funding agencies including the World Bank and the Asian Development Bank.

As part of the effort to pursue the Four Modernizations, the Chinese government revived plans for the Three Gorges Dam, emphasizing the need to develop hydroelectric power.

== Proposed additions ==
On December 5, 1978, former Red Guard Wei Jingsheng posted "democracy" as the Fifth Modernization on the Democracy Wall in Beijing. He was arrested a few months later and jailed for 15 years until 1993.

== See also ==
- Deng Xiaoping Theory
- Shenzhen speed
- East-West Cultural Debate
