= Nanjing incident (1976) =

1976 anti-Cultural Revolution protest

The Nanjing incident, or Nanjing Anti Cultural Revolution Force Movement, was a movement to commemorate Zhou Enlai and oppose the Cultural Revolution (1966–1976) that occurred in Nanjing, China, in 1976. The movement was initially organized by Nanjing University faculty members and students. It soon spread countrywide and led to the Tiananmen incident.

The movement was caused by Premier Zhou Enlai's death on 8 January 1976 and the Qingming festival on April 5 that year. The Gang of Four anticipated that people would use the Qingming festival to commemorate Zhou's death, as many felt he had not been properly honored immediately after his death. On March 25, the Shanghai newspaper Wenhui Bao, controlled by the Gang of Four, published an article criticizing Deng Xiaoping, with implied attacks on Zhou as Deng's "backer", for capitalist ideas. This resulted in large crowds of protesters, including former Red Guards, surrounding the newspaper's offices. In Nanjing, similar protests spread from Nanjing University to the city streets, with people carrying wreaths to the Yuhuatai Memorial. Gang of Four supporters later removed the wreaths and suppressed news of the protest in official media channels, but news still spread to other cities. In response to the protests, Deng was criticized at a Politburo meeting for leading capitalists and attempting to seize power.

The Nanjing protests subsequently spread to Beijing in the Tiananmen incident. On 30 March 1976, wreaths honoring Zhou Enlai began appearing in Beijing. By April 4, over two thousand wreaths had been laid at Tiananmen Square, and over a hundred thousand protested their subsequent removal. The protesters were told to leave, and at 23:00 on April 5, the militia cleared out the remaining thousand protestors, using clubs and arresting over a hundred people.
