= Beijing Social and Economic Research Institute =

Chinese think tank

The Beijing Social and Economic Research Institute was the first independent political think tank in China, which was created in 1986 by members of the Beijing Spring group, in an aftermath of the Democracy Wall events of 1978–79. It closed after the Tiananmen Square protests of 1989.
