= Ren Wanding =

- 任畹町
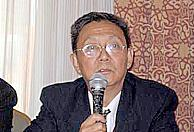
- Born: c. 1944
- Occupation: democracy activist
- Organization: China Human Rights League
- Known for: activism, imprisonment
- Spouse: Zhang Fengying

Ren Wanding (Chinese: 任畹町; pinyin: Rén Wǎndīng; born c. 1944) is a Chinese dissident who was jailed several times for his pro-democracy activism. He is the founder of the China Human Rights League.

== Biography ==
In the late 1970s, he was jailed for four years for his leadership of the Democracy Wall movement. After his release, he worked as an accountant. In 1988, he published an essay through foreign press commemorating the movement's tenth anniversary. When asked if he feared a second imprisonment, Ren replied, "I went through some very frightening experiences ... But China has no democracy and no human rights, and its living standard is too low. These are even more frightening."

In 1989, he was arrested again for speaking at the Tiananmen Square protests of 1989. Ren was the only one of the 71 arrested dissidents who did not recant his position when on trial. He was sentenced to seven years in prison, leading Amnesty International to name him a prisoner of conscience. In 1992, authorities evicted Ren's wife and daughter from their home. Ren was reported to be suffering from untreated cataracts and severe haemorrhoids in 1993, leading AI to issue a medical alert on his behalf. While still imprisoned, he won the 1994 Robert F. Kennedy Human Rights Award. He was released in June 1996 after serving his full sentence.

After Ren's release, he attempted to register the China Democracy Party (CDP) as a legal political party, but police officers were stationed outside his home to stop him from filing the application. The incident caused a split in the leadership of the dissident movement when fellow dissident Xu Wenli founded his own branch of the CDP as a rival to Ren's. Ren stated that Xu was "raping the party" and "stepping on others" in his ambition, while Xu called Ren a "weak person" who had renounced his claim to lead the party.

In 2001, Ren supported China's successful bid for the 2008 Summer Olympics, stating that he hoped the event would empower the reform movement: "China needs to improve its human rights ... Opposing the Olympics won't help reach that goal." In 2007, Chinese authorities gave him permission to visit Hong Kong.

Ren has a wife, Zhang Fengying, and one daughter.
