= Liu Jingsheng =

Chinese activist

- 刘京生
- Born: c. 1950
- Occupation: Political activist
- Known for: Democracy Wall, co-editor of Tansuo (Explorations)
- Notable work: Tansuo
- Awards: PEN/Barbara Goldsmith Freedom to Write Award (1998)

Liu Jingsheng (Chinese: 刘京生; pinyin: Liú Jīngshēng; born c.1950) is a Chinese political opposition activist and a former co-editor of Tansuo (Explorations), a journal he founded in the late 1970s with Wei Jingsheng.

== Biography ==
Liu played a leading role in the Democracy Wall and was arrested (when?). Upon his release, Liu resumed his job as a bus driver. In 1992, he was arrested again for his associations with "counter-revolutionary organizations." Liu was released in November 2004.

Liu was awarded the PEN/Barbara Goldsmith Freedom to Write Award in 1998.
