= Tiananmen Square protests (disambiguation) =

The 1989 Tiananmen Square protests and massacre were student-led demonstrations in Beijing and the government response in 1989.

Tiananmen Square protests or Tiananmen Square incident may also refer to:

== Protests ==
- 1919 Tiananmen Square protest, a protest that grew into the May Fourth Movement
- 1925 Tiananmen Square protest during the May Thirtieth Movement
- 1926 Tiananmen demonstration, which became the March 18 Massacre
- 1935 Tiananmen Square protest, the December 9th Movement
- 1948 Tiananmen protests during the student movement against hunger, civil war, and political suppression
- 1976 Tiananmen Incident, a spontaneous protest of 4–5 April 1976
- 1989 Tiananmen Square protests and massacre
- 2001 Tiananmen Square self-immolation incident, an incident allegedly involving Falun Gong practitioners

== People ==
- "Tank Man", an anonymous protester who blocked tanks leaving Tiananmen Square in 1989

== Attacks ==
- 1982 Tiananmen Square car attack
- 2013 Tiananmen Square attack
