= Wang Juntao =

Chinese democracy activist

- 王军涛
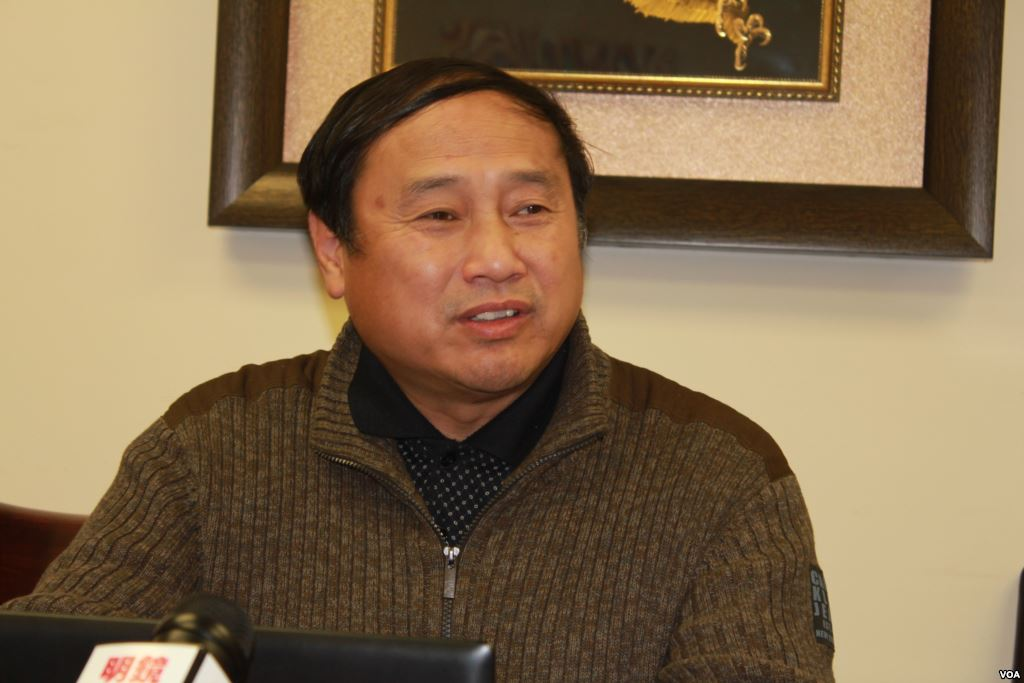
- Wang Juntao in 2015
- Born: July 11, 1958 (age 68); Beijing, China
- Education: Peking University; Columbia University; Harvard University
- Occupations: Political dissident; Democracy activist
- Political party: Democracy Party of China

Wang Juntao (Chinese: 王军涛; pinyin: Wáng Jūntāo; born July 11, 1958) is a Chinese dissident and democracy activist accused by the Communist government for being one of the "black hands" behind the Tiananmen Student Movement. He was listed first on the government's "six important criminals" list, and was sentenced to a thirteen-year prison term in 1991 for his alleged work of "conspiring to subvert the government and of counter-revolutionary propaganda and agitation". Wang was released from prison for medical reasons in 1994 and has been living in exile in the United States.

== Early life ==
Wang Juntao was born in Beijing on July 11, 1958, the son of a high-ranking officer in the People's Liberation Army. He had received a standard education in communist ideology as a child, but had doubts about Communist rule later in life. On April 5, 1976, at the age of 17, Wang was imprisoned for his active participation as a leader during the April 15th movement taking place in the final year of the Cultural Revolution. Wang was jailed for political activity most notably, for writing political poems that infuriated the leadership of the Gang of Four and taking part in demonstrations commemorating the death of Zhou Enlai. After Mao's death, Wang was released from prison and devoted his life to working for the democratization of China. In 1978, Wang became an activist of the Democracy Wall and during this period, he founded the "Beijing Zhi Chun" (Beijing Spring) magazine, which was derived from and influenced by the Prague Spring of 1968.

In 1988, Wang co-founded and launched China's first private institute and think tank: The Beijing Social and Economic Sciences Research Institute, also referred to as (SESRI) with his colleague and friend, Chen Ziming. SESRI carried out studies for public or private clients, published books, and conducted opinion polls on the political attitudes of people in China, such as democracy and reform. This privatization of knowledge and analysis was a first in China, and it obtained freedom of expression without government control. Under the SESRI, the Weekly, a non-official newspaper, became an influential independent Chinese newspaper that published intellectuals' public opinion and analysed the expression of opinions and responses to the 1989 protest. Wang was editor-in-chief of the Weekly and was also author and co-author of 24 essays that commented on the problems of economic reform, criticizing Chinese economists, and the state of economic research.

== Role in Tiananmen protests ==
The death of Hu Yaobang on April 15, 1989 sparked the people's movement in which Wang Juntao and Chen Ziming became furtively involved. During the early stages of the movement, the Weekly was very cautious in publishing content. However, on May 7, the Weekly published an article entitled: "To achieve political stability in social progress" – asking the government not to treat the students' protests as a source of political turmoil, but to pay attention to political reforms, promoting anti-corruption measures, and establishing a stable situation via a new way of political thinking.

After the student hunger strike began on May 13, Wang and his colleagues gave up the position of detachment and became actively involved in the student movement. Wang and Chen organized daily meetings with intellectuals, students, and journalists in hopes of influencing their protesting strategies by discussing and advising them about what to do. The institute became one of the "behind the scenes" facilitators of the student movement and were also consulted by reformers inside the government, such as Bao Tong. On May 22, two days after the imposition of Martial Law, Wang and Chen organized an advisory center for the students in Tiananmen Square to try to persuade the students to withdraw to avoid military intervention and violence.

In the aftermath of June 4, the CCP labelled Wang Juntao as one of the masterminds of the 1989 movement and placed him on China's most wanted list. Wang sought out student leaders who had vacated the square during the military advance, and wanted to smuggle them out of Beijing to help them escape; Wang Dan was among them. After three days of searching, Wang gathered them together and took them by train to Harbin where they could escape to Shanghai by plane. Wang had gone into hiding in various towns around China thereafter, but was found and arrested in Changsha four months later while trying to purchase a train ticket during his planned escape to Hong Kong.

== Later life ==
Following his arrest in October 1989, Wang was held without charge for thirteen months at Qincheng Prison and was indicted with being the instigator of the "April disturbances in Beijing" and the "black hand"; he was tried on February 11, 1991 and sentenced to 13 years in prison. In March 1991, Wang requested medical treatment after blood tests confirmed that he had contracted Hepatitis B and was suffering from coronary heart disease. Despite thirty written requests for care, officials insisted he was not ill and transferred Wang to punitive solitary confinement in Beijing No.2 Prison. In August 1991, Wang announced that he was going on hunger strike to protest his poor conditions and the authorities' refusal to allow his wife for visitation. On August 13, Chen Ziming who had also been given a thirteen-year sentence, decided to join Wang in the hunger strike. Wang went on hunger strikes on twenty-one occasions from the day of his arrest to his release in April 1994 – his third and longest hunger strike lasted 58 days, during which he was force fed twice a day to keep him alive.

In September 1991, the Justice Ministry announced that Wang had been moved to a hospital in Yanqing Prison and a spokesman acknowledged that he was suffering from hepatitis. In 1992, Wang's wife Hou Xiaotian took legal action challenging court rulings on valuables that were confiscated from him during the fall of 1989, and the second against Qincheng Prison where Wang was held after his arrest in October 1989, for being responsible for him contracting hepatitis. In 1993, Hou wrote a letter: "Free My Husband" to U.S. President Bill Clinton, appealing for her husband's release to the West and asking for U.S. involvement for efforts to advance human rights. Under pressure from Bill Clinton and international associations and trade talks, the U.S. negotiated for Wang's release. In February 1994, the White House announced that Beijing had until June 3 to show signs of openness in terms of human rights. If not, the American government would withdraw the trade privileges that allowed China to export their products to the American market.

On April 24, Wang Juntao was released from prison and taken to Beijing airport to be put on a flight for New York. China announced that Wang was freed for medical reasons and would be treated in the United States, with no intentions of letting him return to China. Wang Juntao has been living in the U.S. since 1994, and resides in Flushing, Queens, New York. In 1997, Wang completed his master's degree at Harvard University in Public Administration, and in 2006, he completed his PhD in Political Science Government at Columbia University.
