= The Fifth Modernization =

Pro-democracy essay in China

- Author: Wei Jingsheng
- Publication date: 1978

The Fifth Modernization
- Simplified Chinese: 第五个现代化
- Traditional Chinese: 第五個現代化
Transcriptions
Standard Mandarin
- Hanyu Pinyin: Dì wǔ ge/gè xiàndàihuà di4 wu3 {ge5 ge4} xian4 dai4 hua4
Yue: Cantonese
- Jyutping: dai6 ng5 go3 jin6 doi6 faa3

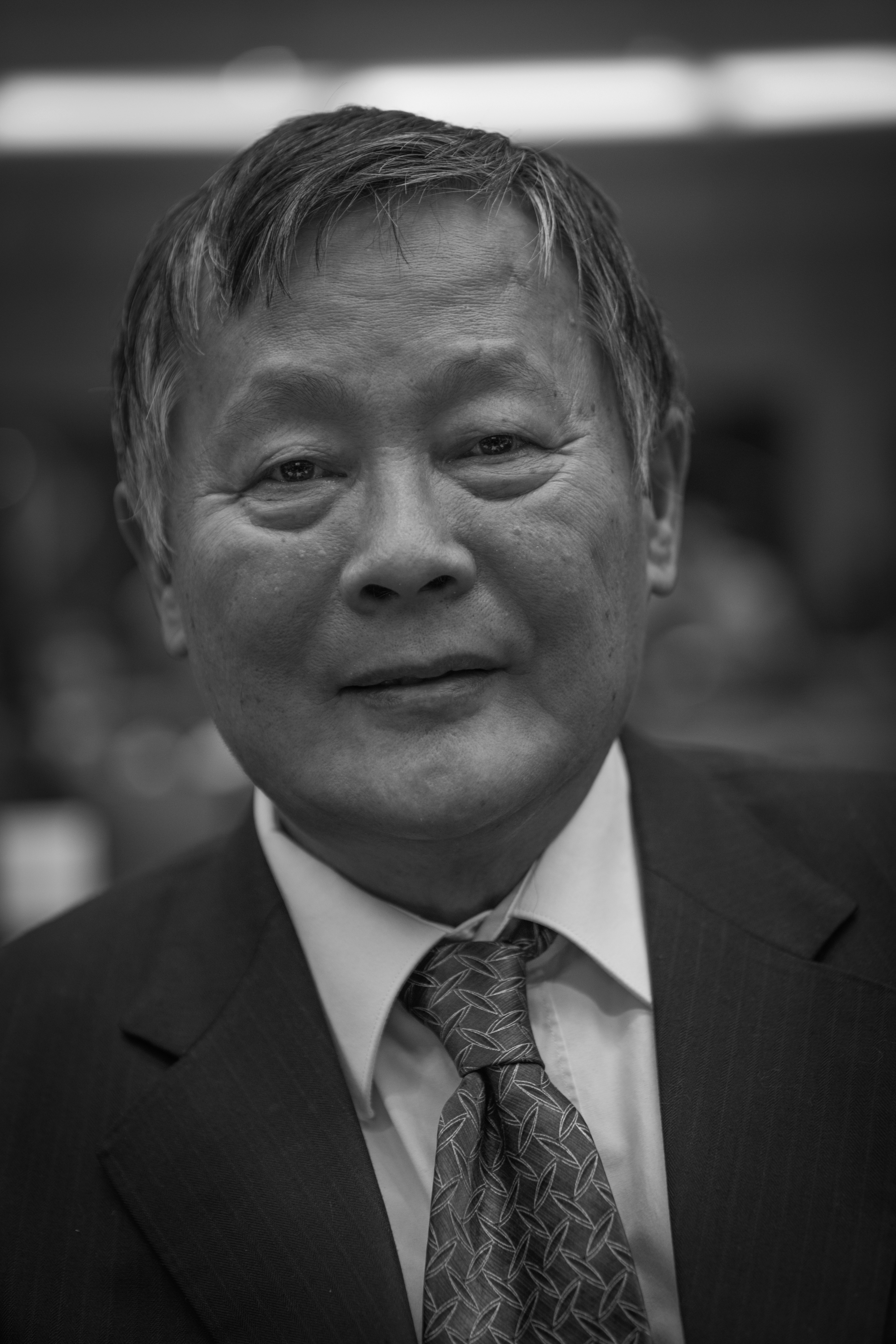
Wei Jingsheng

"The Fifth Modernization" is an essay by human rights activist Wei Jingsheng, originally begun as a signed wall poster placed on the Democracy Wall in Beijing on December 5, 1978.

== Summary ==
The poster called on the Chinese Communist Party to add democracy to the list of the Four Modernizations, which already included industry, agriculture, science and technology, and national defense. It openly stated democracy was an additional modernization that needed to be pursued if China truly wanted to modernize itself.

== See also ==
- Beijing Spring
- Democracy Wall
