= Democracy Wall =

1978–1979 protest movement in China

Coordinates: 39.9061°N 116.3681°E

Democracy Wall Movement
- Part of Beijing Spring, Reform and Opening Up and the Chinese Democracy Movement
- Date: 1978; November 1978 – Spring 1981
- Location: Beijing, China
- Caused by: Death of Zhou Enlai and Mao Zedong, end of the Cultural Revolution
- Goals: Opposing bureaucratism; Political liberalisation; Increased civil rights and political participation; End to government corruption and socio-economic reform; Calls for rehabilitation of victims of the Cultural Revolution; Challenging the ideological lines of Lin Biao and Deng Xiaoping's continued authoritarian rule
- Result: Political crackdown; Arrests

Lead figures
Wei Jingsheng (Activist, writer); Li Yizhe (Pen name)	Chinese Communist Party; Deng Xiaoping

From November 1978 to December 1979, thousands of people put up "big character posters" on a long brick wall of Xidan Street, Xicheng District of Beijing, to protest about the political and social issues of China; the wall became known as the Democracy Wall of Xidan (Chinese: 西单民主墙; pinyin: Xīdān mínzhǔ qiáng). Under acquiescence of the Chinese government, other kinds of protest activities, such as unofficial journals, petitions, and demonstrations, were also soon spreading out in major cities of China. This movement can be seen as the beginning of the Chinese Democracy Movement. It is also known as the "Democracy Wall Movement". This short period of political liberation was known as the Beijing Spring.

== Background ==
=== The Cultural Revolution ===
In 1966, when Mao Zedong launched the Cultural Revolution, millions of middle school, high school, and college students answered Mao's call, being organized as the Red Guards to rebel and root out the capitalist roaders from within the Chinese Communist Party. But, in 1969, after using students in restoring the social order, Mao launched the Down to the Countryside Movement to exile the student Red Guards to rural areas. This movement caused a lot of red guards to feel purposely abandoned by Mao.

In 1971, Lin Biao's attempted coup and death shattered the widespread belief in Mao's infallibility and in the Cultural Revolution's success.

On November 10, 1974, Li Yizhe's big-character poster entitled "On Democracy and Legality under Socialism" appeared on a wall at an intersection on Beijing Road in Guangzhou, Guangdong Province. The 67 pages of the paper focused on: (1) Damage to the citizens caused by bureaucratic corruptions of the Chinese Communist Party during the Cultural Revolution; and (2) the need to practice democracy and a legal system in China. This big-character poster proved that people started to re-evaluate the Cultural Revolution and political system of China.

The core of the Democracy Movement was composed of former Red Guards.

=== The Tiananmen Incident of 1976 ===
Premier Zhou Enlai, a widely respected senior CCP leader, died on January 8, 1976. On April 5, at the Qingming Festival, thousands of Beijing's residents gathered in Tiananmen Square. They wrote poems and put up big character posters in Tiananmen Square to mourn for Zhou and express their anger towards the impious Gang of Four and the destructive Cultural Revolution. In response, Mao ordered the police and the PLA to disperse the people, and around four thousand were arrested. This incident was also called the April 5th Movement. Deng Xiaoping was announced as the "black hand" of the movement. On April 7, Mao Zedong proposed that the Politburo of the Central Committee of the CCP denounce Deng Xiaoping's official positions and that Hua Guofeng would assume Deng's positions as Prime Minister of the State Council and the vice-chairman of the CCP. The committee adopted both proposals.

=== The Discussion on Criteria of Truth ===
After Mao Zedong's death occurred on September 9, 1976, with Hua Guofeng as Mao's successor, he felt threatened by the politically domineering Gang of Four. On October 6, under the support of Ye Jianying, Li Xiannian, and other members of the Politburo, Hua Guofeng arrested the Gang of Four. On the following day, Hua was voted in as chairman of the CCP and chairman of the Central Military Committee by a joint meeting of the First Secretaries of the Provincial Party Committees and the Politburo of the Central Committee of the CCP. For proving his legitimacy, Hua instructed Wang Dongxing to let the People's Daily, People's Liberation Army Daily, and Red Flag magazine to publish an editorial now known as the Two Whatevers. Hua claimed that they would honor Mao's policy and his instruction to the full extent. On the other hand, on July 21, 1977, during the 3rd Plenary Session of the CCP's 10th Central Committee, Deng Xiaoping resumed his positions as Prime Minister of the State Council and vice-chairman of the CCP. After Deng came back to work, he started to fix some political decisions of Mao's era. During the spring of 1978, 130,000 victims of the Anti-Rightist Movement who had been removed from their positions in 1957, recovered their social statuses. Deng continued to challenge Hua's legitimacy and fight for the domination in ideological field. For example, Deng wrote an essay on May 24, 1977, titled "The 'Two Whatever' Policy Does Not Accord With Marxism". Under the support of Deng Xiaoping, Hu Yaobang indicated a party journal, Theoretical Trends to publish the article "Pragmatism is the Only Standard in Measuring Truth" on May 10, 1978, which marked the key difference between Deng and Hua. This article was re-published in Guangming Daily, People's Daily, and People's Liberation Army Daily and soon caused a huge discussion movement in China, which was called The Discussion on Criteria of Truth .

== Ideologies ==
The Democracy Wall movement framed the key issue as the elimination of bureaucratism and the bureaucratic class. However, the movement lacked ideological cohesion. It involved many individuals and small groups with diverse political views and areas of concern. "From an organizational standpoint, there was no single movement" and ideological views were often sharply-divided. While Democracy Wall participants agreed that "democracy" was the means to resolve the conflict between the bureaucratic class and the people, the nature of the proposed democratic institutions was a major source of disagreement. A majority of participants in the movement viewed the movement as part of a struggle between correct and incorrect notions of Marxism. Many participants advocated classical Marxist views that drew on the Paris Commune for inspiration. The Democracy Wall movement also included non-Marxists and anti-Marxists, although these participants were a minority.

Thus, demands for "democracy" were frequent but without an agreed-upon meaning. Participants in the movement variously associated the concept of democracy with socialism, communism, liberal democracy, capitalism, and Christianity. They drew on a diverse range of intellectual resources "ranging from classical Marxist and socialist traditions to Enlightenment philosophers, [socialist] experiments in Yugoslavia, and Western liberal democracy."

Unofficial "people's journals" published by activists were the ideological core of the movement. These journals likewise discussed a wide range of topics and ideological stances, including commentaries on socialism, democracy, Marxism, civil rights, and morality, socioeconomic conditions (including wage reform, inequality, and consumer and housing shortages) as well as artistic and literary matters.

Criticism of Mao Zedong and the Cultural Revolution were the most common complaint by movement participants. Some participants, however, revived the Cultural Revolution-era "ultra-left" argument against China's "bureaucratic class."

== Wall posters ==
Under the influence of the official discussion, the general public also started to put up big character posters to cause a debate. On August 18, 1977, the 11th National Congress of the CCP recommended adding the "Four Freedoms" (Chinese: 四大自由) to Article 45 of the constitution. ("Four Freedoms" or "Four Big" was a political slogan during the Cultural Revolution, which means people have the rights to freedom of speech, freedom of debate, and freedom of putting up big character posters.) From June to July 1978, big character posters were widely spread on major universities of Beijing. The posters were initially encouraged to criticize the Gang of Four and previous failed government policies as part of Deng Xiaoping's struggle to gain political power. In September, foreign journalists reported that they were allowed free contact with the Chinese people. This report was reproduced in the CCP's internal journal, Reference Information.

=== The beginning of the Democracy Wall ===
On October 1, 1978, the words "to liberate thought, to provide the best service to the people are the duties of CCP members", a theme for the CCP Party, was posted on the Xidan Wall in Beijing by civilians. Since then, people were allowed to post their opinions and free-style literature on street walls throughout the country. On November 23, Lü Pu (Chinese: 吕朴) posted his writings on the Democracy Wall in Xidan. He critiqued Mao Zedong and pointed out that the real reasons behind the April 5 Movement were a backward economy, rigid thought control, and the poor living conditions of the people. This poster was called the "Fire Lighter of Democracy Wall". On November 25, 1978, the Democracy Assembly Group was formed by Ren Wanding and eight other youths. Two days later they gathered at Xidan Democracy Wall and led a public march to Tiananmen Square. Over 10,000 participants demanded democracy and human rights for China. This date marks the beginning of the Democracy Wall.

=== Deng's attitudes at the beginning ===
Initially, Deng found the movement politically beneficial, as many early posters criticized the "little Gang of Four" Politburo members who backed Hua Guofeng. So, Deng was still supporting the Democracy Wall movement, during this time, as he remarked to several leaders. On November 26, he told the Japanese delegates of the Democratic Socialist Party that, according to the Constitution, the Democracy Wall activities were legal. However, he noted that some party comrades did not want to criticize Mao, and he agreed. Deng's attitude caused more and more people gathering in Democracy Wall and put up poster to express their opinions and support Deng.

=== "The Fifth Modernization" ===
However, besides the pro-Deng group, there was also anti-Deng voice. On December 5, 1978, the most famous poster of the Democracy Wall, "The Fifth Modernization: Democracy and Others" written by writer and activist Wei Jingsheng, was posted on Democracy Wall. This long article strongly criticized the undemocratic practice of Mao and Deng. It also emphasized that (1) the history of Germany, Russia and China proved that anti-democracy was the cause of the poor living conditions of the people; and (2) the political system of Yugoslavia would be a good model for bringing economic wellbeing to the people.

=== Petitioners' wall poster ===
Besides the big character posters, that talk about the democracy, freedom, and human rights, there were also many posters written by petitioners detailing the suffering and persecution endured during the Cultural Revolution and bureaucratic corruption of local officials. They put up their posters on the same walls and tried to draw attention from the central government to solve their individual cases. However, because this kind of posters were written by less educated people, except for some articles which were re-published in unofficial journals, most of the petitioner's posters were torn off afterwards.

== Unofficial journals ==
Academic Liu Sheng-chi writes that the journals of the Democracy Wall movement fall into three categories: (1) the radical left, (2) moderates, and (3) the radical right. The first two categories of journals strayed within the political tradition of Marxism, while the third challenged it.

=== Original journals ===
Another format of the debate and demonstration was also rapidly developing in China: the "unofficial journals", also known as "people's journals," "independent journals," or "underground journals" (Chinese: 地下刊物). On November 26, 1978, Enlightenment (Chinese: 启蒙), the first unofficial publication, appeared in Guiyang. Later it was reprinted in Beijing in January 1979. On December 16, 1978, another very famous unofficial journal, The Forum of April Fifth (Chinese: 四五论坛) published its first issue. Soon, different groups of activities formed their own editorial organizations to express different political opinions. The arguments concerning political reforms could be divided into three general categories according to their attitudes towards Marxism: classical Marxism, eclectic Marxism, and anti-Marxism radicals.

Throughout late 1978 and early 1979, crowds would gather to buy or exchange issues of these people's journals.

=== Lists of unofficial journals ===
From the winter of 1978 to spring 1981, over 50 unofficial journals appeared in Beijing alone. The following list includes some famous journals during the movement:

Journal (English name)	Journal (Chinese name)	Editors (Romanized names)	Editors (Chinese names)
April Fifth Forum	《四五论坛》	Xu Wenli, Liu Qing, Zhao Nan	徐文立，刘青，赵南
Beijing Spring	《北京之春》	Chen Ziming, Zhou Weimin, Wang Juntao	陈子明，周为民，王军涛
Chinese Alliance of Human Rights	《中国人权同盟》	Ren Wanding	任畹町
Democracy and Law			
Enlightenment	《启蒙》		
Explorations	《探索》	Wei Jingsheng, Liu Jingsheng, Lu Lin, Yang Guang	魏京生，刘京生，路林，杨光
Fertile Soil	《沃土》	Hu Ping, Jiang Hong	胡平，姜洪
Harvest	《秋实》		
Jintian (Today)	《今天》	Bei Dao, Mang Ke, Liu Nianchun, Xu Xiao, Chen Maiping	北岛，芒克，刘念春，徐晓，陈迈平
Masses' Reference Forum			
People's Forum			
Science			
Seeking Truth Newspaper	《求是报》		
Voice of the People			

=== Organizations ===
Since early 1979, unofficial journals became the backbone of the Democracy Wall Movement. The activities were also seeking to organize together to form a stronger concentrated structure. On January 15, 1979, six leading unofficial journals announced their intention to fight for the basic constitutional rights: freedom of speech and freedom of the press without retaliation. These freedoms were never realized. On January 28, the members of seven unofficial journals in Beijing organized a joint conference to counter the criticism against their literature on Democracy Wall. These members then met weekly to discuss recent public issues. However, this was still a very loose organization and their opinions varied to the point of not achieving their objectives.

=== Impact of the unofficial journals ===
The wall posters and the underground journals' connections were intimately linked. It was a common practice to print posters in the journals, as well as to post the printed pages on the Xidan Wall. The editors also sold their journals near the Democracy Wall. Printing and publishing journals was not an easy task due to the lack of technicians and funding. So, the journals' circulation was relatively small, usually from 200 to 500 copies per issue. As, for example, the editors of People's Reference News (Chinese: 群众参考消息) calculated in May 1979, they had some 300-400 subscribers and had received almost 1000 letters from readers in two months. However, compared to wall posters, journals were more substantial than the numbers of subscribers, because people usually hand copy and re-send to other people, which caused the unofficial journal to be widely spread all over China. The most complete collection of the unofficial documents today is the 20-volume Collection of Underground Publications Circulated on Chinese Mainland (Chinese: 大陆地下刊物汇编), which was edited by the Taiwanese Institution for the Study of Chinese Communist Problems from 1980 to 1985.

== See also ==
- History of the People's Republic of China (1976–1989)
- Beijing Spring
- The Democracy Wall of City University of Hong Kong
