= 1976 Tiananmen incident =

1976 protest in Beijing, China

- Part of the Cultural Revolution
- Crowds of mourners gathering in Tiananmen Square on 5 April 1976
- Date: 4–5 April 1976 (2 days)
- Location: Tiananmen Square
- Caused by: Death of Zhou Enlai; Discontent with the Cultural Revolution

Parties
People's Liberation Army; Militia	Mourners; Protestors

Lead figures
Jiang Qing; Hua Guofeng	No centralized leadership

Number
Unknown	100,000

Casualties
- Deaths: Unknown
- Arrested: 40

1976 Tiananmen incident
- Simplified Chinese: 四五天安门事件
- Traditional Chinese: 四五天安門事件
- Literal meaning: 5 April Tian'anmen incident
Transcriptions
Standard Mandarin
- Hanyu Pinyin: sìwǔ Tiān'ānmén shìjiàn
- Wade–Giles: ssu^{4} T'ien^{1}-an^{1}-men^{4} shih^{4}-chien^{4}
Yue: Cantonese
- Jyutping: sei^{3}ng^{5} Tin^{1}ngon^{1}mun^{4} si^{6}gin^{6}

The 1976 Tiananmen incident or the April 5 Tiananmen incident (Chinese: 四五天安门事件) was a mass gathering and protest that took place on 4–5 April 1976, at Tiananmen Square in Beijing, China. The incident occurred on the traditional day of mourning, the Qingming Festival, after the Nanjing incident, and was triggered by the death of Premier Zhou Enlai earlier that year. Some people strongly disapproved of the removal of the displays of mourning, and began gathering in the Square to protest against the central authorities, then largely under the auspices of the Gang of Four, who ordered the Square to be cleared.

The event was labeled "counterrevolutionary" immediately after its occurrence by the Communist Party's Central Committee and served as a gateway to the dismissal and house arrest of then-Vice Premier Deng Xiaoping, who was accused of planning the event, while he insisted that he was nearby only for a haircut. The Central Committee's decision on the event was reversed after the Cultural Revolution ended, as it would later be officially hailed as a display of patriotism.

== Origins ==
The death of Premier Zhou Enlai, a widely respected senior Chinese leader, on January 8, 1976, prompted the incident. For several years before his death, Zhou was involved in a political power struggle against other senior leaders in the Politburo of the Chinese Communist Party, with Zhou's most visible and powerful antagonists being the four senior members who came to be called the Gang of Four. The leader of the clique, Jiang Qing, was the wife of Communist Party Chairman, Mao Zedong. To defuse an expected popular outpouring of sentiment at Zhou's death, the Chinese Communist Party limited the period of public mourning.

On April 4, 1976, on the eve of China's annual Qingming Festival, in which Chinese traditionally pay homage to their deceased ancestors, thousands gathered around the Monument to the People's Heroes in Tiananmen Square to commemorate the life and death of Zhou Enlai by laying wreaths, banners, poems, placards, and flowers at the foot of the Monument. The most obvious purpose of this memorial was to eulogize Zhou, but Jiang Qing, Zhang Chunqiao, and Yao Wenyuan were also attacked for their alleged actions against the Premier. A small number of slogans left at Tiananmen even attacked Mao himself, and his Cultural Revolution.

Up to two million people may have visited Tiananmen Square on April 4. First-hand observations of the events in Tiananmen Square on April 4 report that all levels of society, from the poorest peasants to high-ranking PLA officers and the children of high-ranking cadres, were represented in the activities. Those who participated were motivated by a mixture of anger over the treatment of Zhou, revolt against Mao and his policies, apprehension for China's future, and defiance of those who would seek to punish the public for commemorating Zhou's memory. There is nothing to suggest that events were coordinated from any position of leadership: it was a spontaneous demonstration reflecting widespread public sentiment. Deng Xiaoping was notably absent, and he instructed his children to avoid being seen at the square.

== Incident ==
On the night of April 4, the Central Committee of the Chinese Communist Party held a meeting to discuss the situation in Tiananmen Square. Party elders such as Hua Guofeng and Wu De, who were not close allies of the Gang of Four, expressed criticism at the protesters and some of their slogans which were critical of the Gang of Four and party leadership. Meanwhile, the Gang of Four seemed to have been alarmed by the personal attacks at the event, and began to use their controlled newspapers to accuse Deng Xiaoping of encouraging and controlling the protesters. They consulted with the sickly Mao Zedong, claiming these people to be "capitalist roaders" who were hitting back at the Proletarian Revolution.

Government action began on the morning of April 5, when the People's Liberation Army began removing articles of mourning from Tiananmen. On the morning of April 5, crowds gathering around the memorial arrived to discover that it had been completely removed by the police during the night, angering them. Attempts to suppress the mourners led to a violent riot, in which police cars were set on fire and a crowd of over 100,000 people forced its way into several government buildings surrounding the square.

In response, the Central Committee of the Chinese Communist Party made the decision to forcibly clear Tiananmen Square of mourners. Security forces under the PLA's Beijing detachment, alongside urban militia under the control of the Gang of Four, went into the Square to forcefully clear the area. The militia were reported to have been carrying wooden clubs and leather belts. Approximately 40 arrests occurred with no casualties, and by the morning of April 6, all articles of mourning had been removed.

By 6:00 pm, most of the crowd had dispersed, but a small group remained until 10:00 pm, when a security force entered Tiananmen Square and arrested them. Many of those arrested were later sentenced to "people's trial" at Peking University, or were sentenced to prison work camps. Incidents similar to those which occurred in Beijing on April 4–5 occurred in Zhengzhou, Kunming, Taiyuan, Changchun, Shanghai, Wuhan, and Guangzhou. Possibly because of his close association with Zhou, Deng Xiaoping was formally stripped of all positions "inside and outside the Party" on April 7.

== Legacy ==
After Mao's death, Hua and Wang Dongxing played an important role in arresting the Gang of Four in October 1976. They subsequently expressed their opinion that the Tiananmen incident was not a counter-revolutionary activity. Along with other party elders, they rehabilitated Deng and brought him back to Beijing. Nonetheless, Deng and his reformist allies subsequently became involved in a power struggle against Hua and Wang, who were more traditionally minded Maoists. Deng emerged as China's Paramount Leader in 1978.

Many of the 1976 demonstrators had written poems in memory of Zhou Enlai and as an expression of political opposition to the political situation in China. Poetry created during the incident was later published in four unofficial editions by students from Beijing's Number Two Foreign Language Institute, a school with close ties to Deng Xiaoping.

In December 1978, at the Third Plenum of the CCP Eleventh Central Committee, the Chinese Communist Party reassessed its position on the Tiananmen incident of 1976 and declared it a "revolutionary event", a complete rebuttal of the previous position put forward by the Party.

== See also ==
- Beijing Spring
- Day of Sorrow
- May Fourth Movement
- Tiananmen Square protests of 1989
- U Thant funeral crisis
