= Wei Jingsheng =

Chinese human rights activist (born 1950)

- 魏京生
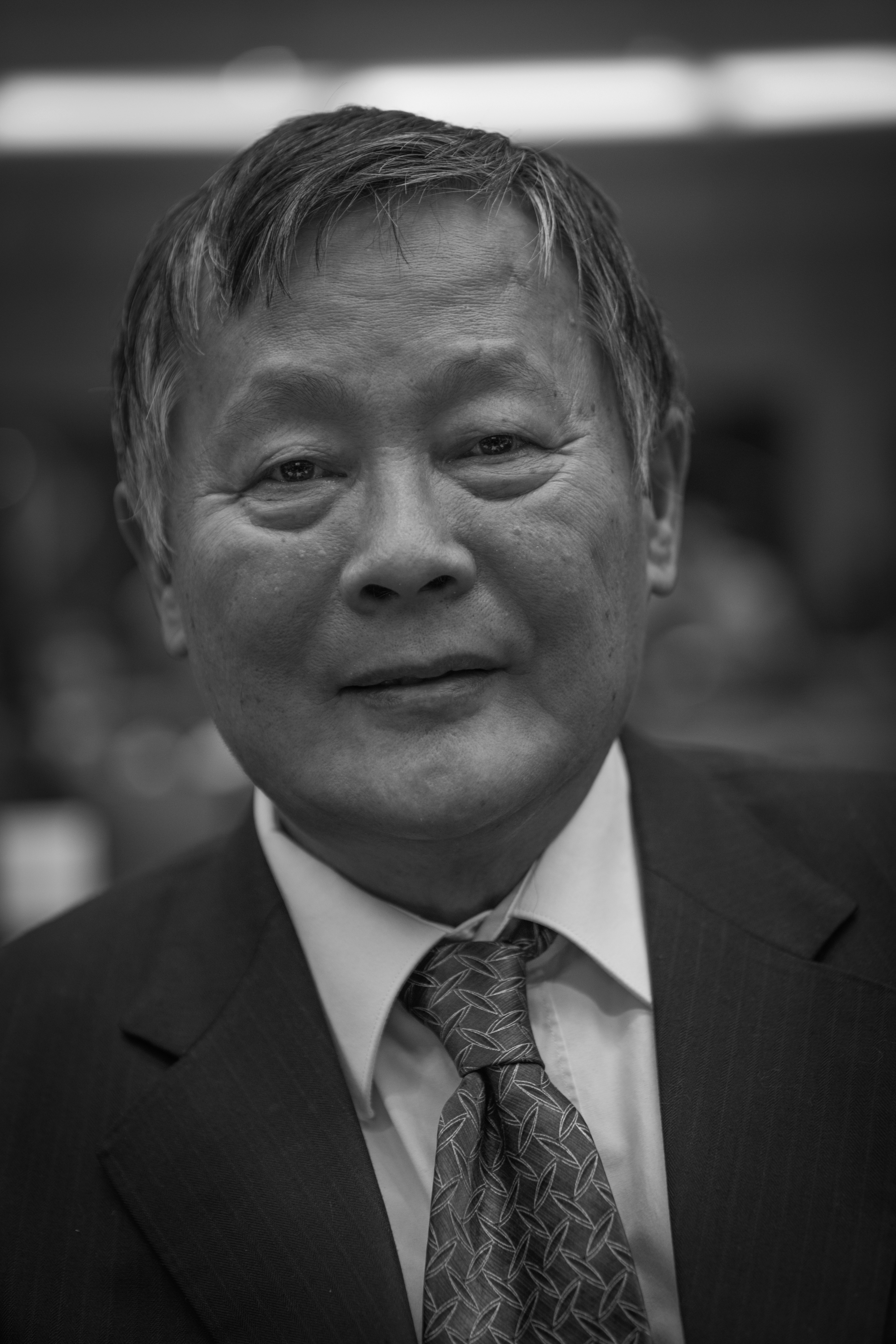
- Wei in 2013
- Born: 20 May 1950 (age 76); Beijing, China
- Education: High School Affiliated to Renmin University of China
- Occupations: Writer; human rights activist
- Known for: Leader of Democracy Wall Movement
- Awards: Olof Palme Prize; Sakharov Prize; Robert F. Kennedy Human Rights Award

Chinese name
- Chinese: 魏京生
Transcriptions
Standard Mandarin
- Hanyu Pinyin: Wèi Jīngshēng
- IPA: [wêɪ tɕíŋʂə́ŋ]

Wei Jingsheng (Chinese: 魏京生; born 20 May 1950) is a Chinese human rights activist and dissident. He is best known for his involvement in the Chinese democracy movement. He is most prominent for having authored the essay "The Fifth Modernization", which was posted on the Democracy Wall in Beijing in 1978. As punishment from the government for writing his manifesto, Wei was arrested and convicted of "counter-revolutionary" activities, and was detained as a political prisoner from 1979 to 1993. Briefly released in 1993, Wei continued to engage in his dissident activities by speaking to visiting journalists, and as punishment, he was imprisoned again from 1994 to 1997, making it a total of 18 years he has spent in various prisons. He was deported to the United States of America on 16 November 1997, on medical parole. Still a Chinese citizen, in 1998 Wei established the Wei Jingsheng Foundation in New York City (now based in Washington, D.C.) whose stated aim is to work to improve human rights and advocate democratisation in China.

== Early years ==
Wei was the oldest of four children, brought up by Chinese Communist Party cadres. In 1966, Wei joined the Red Guards as a 16-year-old student during the Cultural Revolution. He lived in remote rural areas in Northern China and was able to speak with peasant farmers about the widespread famines that had occurred a few years before, during the Great Leap Forward. He uncovered the role that the communist government under Mao Zedong played in causing the famines, and it forced Wei to start questioning the nature of the system under which he lived. Wei would later write about this period: "I felt as if I had suddenly awakened from a long dream, but everyone around me was still plunged in darkness." In 1973, he began working as an electrician at the Beijing Zoo.

== Democracy Wall ==
Wei did not publicly voice his feelings until 1978, when he decided to take part in the newly emerging Democracy Wall movement which was then taking place in Beijing. On 5 December 1978, he posted an essay which he authored on the wall. Entitled "The Fifth Modernization," Wei's essay was a response to paramount leader Deng Xiaoping's essay, the Four Modernizations. The basic theme of Wei's essay is that democracy should also be a modernization goal for China along with the other four modernizations which were proposed by Deng (industry, agriculture, science and technology, and national defense).

Wei signed the essay with his real name and address. The essay immediately caused a stir because of its boldness and because its author was not anonymous. It was also the only essay which addressed Deng Xiaoping by name, and it was also the only essay which referred to him as a dictator.

Of course, internal problems cannot be solved overnight but must be constantly addressed as part of a long-term process. Mistakes and shortcomings will be inevitable, but these are for us to worry about. This is infinitely better than facing abusive overlords against whom there is no redress. Those who worry that democracy will lead to anarchy and chaos are just like those who, following the overthrow of the Qing dynasty, worried that without an emperor the country would fall into chaos. Their decision was to patiently suffer oppression because they feared that without the weight of oppression, their spines might completely collapse! To such people, I would like to say, with all due respect: We want to be the masters of our own destiny. We need no gods or emperors and we don't believe in saviors of any kind...we do not want to serve as mere tools of dictators with personal ambitions for carrying out modernization. We want to modernize the lives of the people. Democracy, freedom, and happiness for all are our sole objectives.

Wei differed from the mainstream of the Democracy Wall movement (which believed that the primary conflict was between a bureaucratic class and the people) because unlike the majority of movement participants, he argued that a totalitarian political system was the source of the people's grievances. He was one of the few activists who explicitly argued against Marxism and the leadership of a Marxist party.

== Arrest and imprisonment ==
Wei is also known for his editorial work in the short-lived magazine Explorations (探索) in 1979. He published a letter under his name in March 1979 in which he denounced the inhuman conditions which existed in Beijing's Qincheng Prison, where the 10th Panchen Lama was imprisoned.

His dissident writings eventually led him to be tried and imprisoned. Orville Schell, a writer and academic who specializes in China, wrote:

On March 25, hearing through the grapevine that a crackdown was imminent, Wei and his colleagues rushed out a special edition of Explorations entitled "Do We Want Democracy or a New Dictatorship?"...

Wei and some thirty other Democracy Wall activists were rounded up [soon after]. That October, Wei Jingsheng was brought to trial and accused of "supplying military intelligence [on China's war with Vietnam] to a foreigner and of openly agitating for the overthrow of the government of the dictatorship of the proletariat and the socialist system in China."...

For his outspoken views, Wei was sentenced to a prison term of 15 years.

Wei ultimately spent a total of 18 years in different prisons in China. During this time, he wrote letters explaining his views which were compiled into a book, The Courage to Stand Alone: Letters from Prison and Other Writings. Some of the letters were directly addressed to Deng Xiaoping, other letters were addressed to different family members of Wei. He remained imprisoned until 14 September 1993, when he was released just one week before the International Olympic Committee held a vote over whether it should award the 2000 Summer Olympics to Beijing or Sydney. Wei continued to speak out, despite the threat of arrest.

On 27 February 1994, Wei met with United States Assistant Secretary of State for Human Rights John Shattuck to discuss human rights conditions in China, and he also met with journalists. Wei was arrested the following week along with fifteen other democracy and labor activists. Although he was released shortly afterward and sent into exile in Tianjin, Wei was arrested once more on 1 April 1994 when he tried to return to Beijing. Charged with plotting against the state, he was sentenced to 14 years in prison, but he would only remain in prison until 16 November 1997, when he was released, ostensibly for medical reasons, and promptly deported to the United States. He was sent to the United States due to international pressure, especially the request by US President Bill Clinton.

== COVID-19 ==
In a September 2021 documentary titled What Really Happened in Wuhan by Australian journalist and author Sharri Markson, Wei claimed that he attempted to warn American authorities about COVID-19 in October 2019 after being informed of an outbreak by contacts in Beijing. He also claims that China was aware of the virus much sooner than they admitted and intentionally spread the virus during the World Military Games in Wuhan when they were held between 19 and 27 October 2019.

== Recognition ==
In 1996, Wei Jingsheng was awarded the Sakharov Prize for Freedom of Thought. He is a winner of numerous other human rights and democracy awards, including the Robert F. Kennedy Human Rights Award in 1996, the National Endowment for Democracy Award in 1997, the Olof Palme Memorial Prize in 1994, and the International Activist Award by the Gleitsman Foundation in 1993.

In 1998, Wei received an honorary Doctor of Humane Letters degree from Bard College.

== See also ==
- List of Chinese dissidents
- Wang Dan (dissident)
