= Portraits overlooking Tiananmen =

Successive portraits overlooking Tiananmen Square

A hand-painted, framed, oil portrait of Chairman of the Chinese Communist Party Mao Zedong overlooks Tiananmen Square in Beijing, China. Measuring 6 × 4.5 metres and weighing up to 1.5 metric tons, it is the largest hand-painted portrait in Asia. Made partly of fiberglass and reinforced plastic, the portrait is replaced every year ahead of China's National Day on October 1.

While the portrait of Mao is standardized today, there have been at least nine other versions. Most were made and used during the early People's Republic, with the current version having been created sometime during the Cultural Revolution.

== History ==
Tiananmen Gate (Chinese: 天安门, "Gate of Heavenly Peace") was constructed in 1420 by the Ming dynasty as the main entrance to the Imperial City, within which the Forbidden City was located. It was this gate from which emperors announced important messages during the imperial era Thus, over the centuries, the monumental structure, positioned just north of what is now Tiananmen Square, grew in national significance. By the 20th century, Tiananmen had become a powerful symbol of China itself. Its importance made Tiananmen Gate a natural location for the display of portraits of national leaders, whose images projected their legitimacy and influence over the nation.

The first portrait to be displayed at Tiananmen Gate, which started the "tradition", was a portrait of Chinese revolutionary and statesman Sun Yat-sen. His portrait was hung up in 1925 by the government of the Republic of China, after his death in March of that year. In 1945, after the Chinese victory over the Empire of Japan, the Nationalist government of China replaced the portrait of Sun Yat-sen with a portrait of the leader of the Republic, Chiang Kai-shek. Continuing to commemorate the Second Sino-Japanese War, in July 1949, after the Pingjin Campaign, which saw the peaceful seizure of Beijing (and Tianjin) by the People's Liberation Army, portraits of Mao Zedong, Zhu De, and other Chinese communist revolutionaries were hung up at Tiananmen Gate.

The first singular portrait of Mao Zedong at Tiananmen Gate was created for the proclamation of the People's Republic of China on October 1, 1949, replacing the multiple portraits that had been displayed previously. Ever since, only a single portrait has been displayed at Tiananmen. On March 9, 1953, Mao's portrait was temporarily replaced by one of Joseph Stalin to commemorate Stalin's death four days earlier. After Mao's own death in September 1976, his color portrait was replaced by a black-and-white photograph taken by the Xinhua News Agency, accompanied by black banners announcing his state funeral.

=== Incidents of vandalism ===
Over the decades, the portrait has been the target of several acts of vandalism. During the Tiananmen Square protests in 1989, a group of protesters, including Yu Dongyue, vandalized it by throwing eggs. Yu was sentenced to life imprisonment but was released on bail 17 years later, in 2006. In May 2007, the portrait caught fire, damaging about 15 percent of it; a 35-year-old unemployed man from Ürümqi, Xinjiang, was arrested for the incident, and the portrait was subsequently repaired. In April 2010, another protester attempted to deface the portrait by throwing a plastic bottle filled with ink, though he missed, and the bottle instead struck the wall near the portrait. He was arrested shortly afterward by Beijing police.

== Artists ==
Artist Zhou Lingzhao was commissioned to paint the portrait of Mao Zedong at Tiananmen Gate for the proclamation of the People's Republic of China on October 1, 1949. This portrait of Mao was replaced in May 1950 by one painted by Xi Mang. The portrait of Mao that hung at Tiananmen from 1950 to 1964 was produced by a team of artists led by Chinese portrait painter Zhang Zhenshi. Zhang's team included the following artists; Zuo Hui (1912–1992), Zhang Hesong (1912–2005) and Wang Qizhi (born 1934).

In 1963, Wang Guodong replaced Zhang as the lead artist. Unlike previous efforts, Wang was the first to paint the portrait by himself. However, during the Cultural Revolution, he was harassed and subjected to a public struggle session, later forced to work for two years as a carpenter at a framing factory. Despite this, he resumed his painting duties and continued creating the portrait through the Cultural Revolution until 1976. Following Mao's death that year, Wang retired. In early 1977, Ge Xiaoguang, a student of Wang Guodong, took over the responsibility. Since then, Ge has continued the tradition of repainting and re-hanging Mao's portrait each year, working from a studio located near Tiananmen Square.

Lead painters of Mao's portraits
No	Name	Years active
1	Zhou Lingzhao	1949 to 1950
2	Xi Mang	1950
3	Zhang Zhenshi	1950 to 1963
4	Wang Guodong	1963 to 1976
5	Ge Xiaoguang	Since 1977

=== Auction controversy ===
In May 2006, an original portrait of Mao Zedong painted by Zhang Zhenshi in the 1950s, which was later used as a model for the Tiananmen portraits, was scheduled to be sold at an auction in Beijing from May 31 to June 4. The painting, owned by a Chinese American, was expected to fetch between 1 and 1.2 million yuan (US$120,000–150,000). After intense online protests—many calling the work a national treasure and strongly opposing its sale—the portrait was withdrawn from the auction. The auction house later announced on its website that, following 'advice from the government,' it had decided not to sell the painting. The owner was reported to be in discussions with several museums in China about possibly donating the work.

== Portraits overlooking Tiananmen over time ==
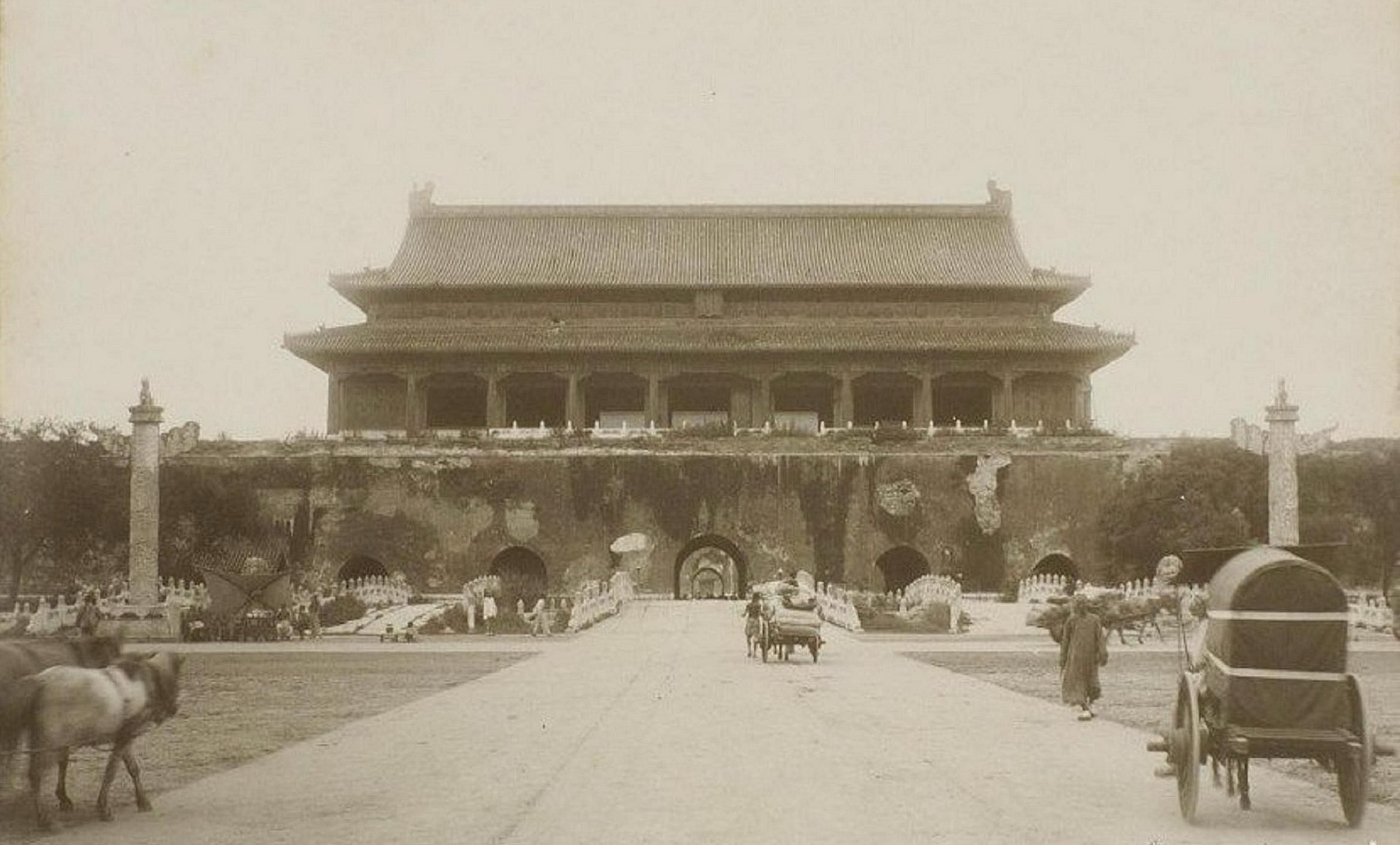
Tiananmen before any portraits were put up, 1901

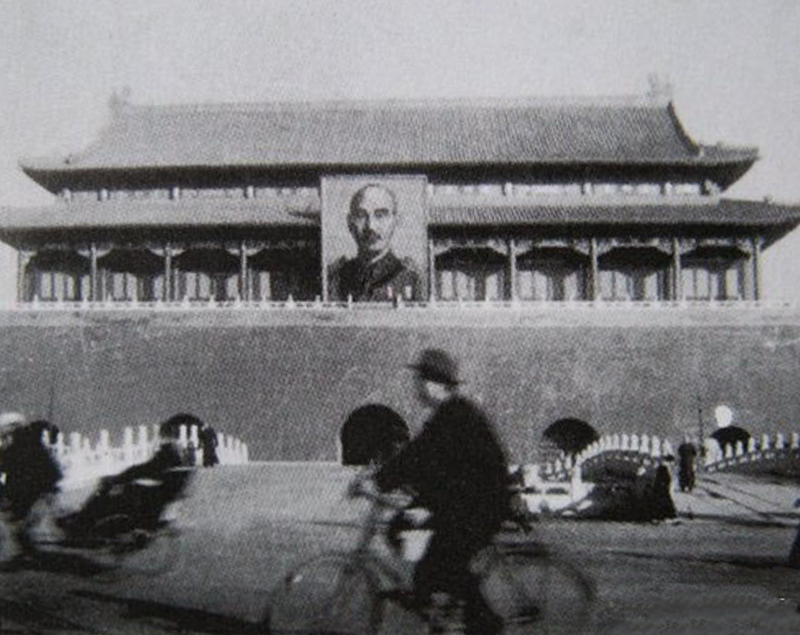
Chiang Kai-shek's portrait, sometime between 1945 and 1949

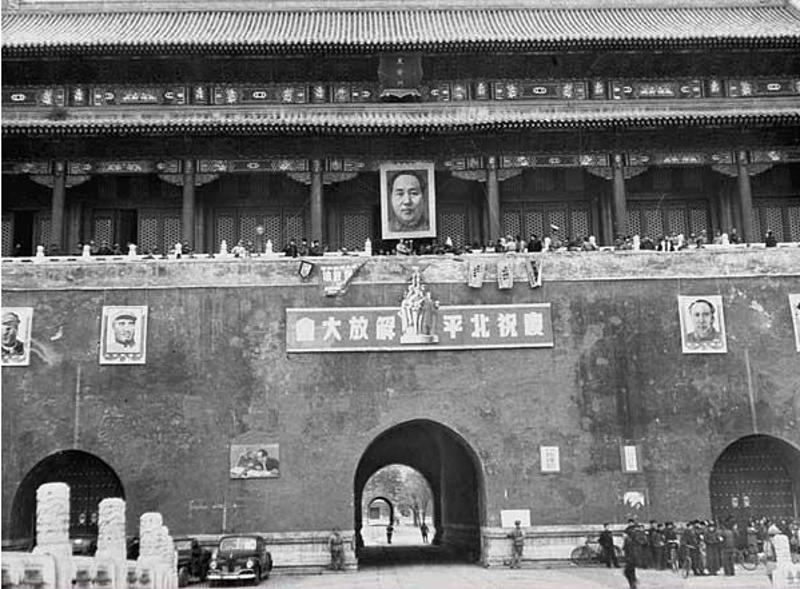
Multiple portraits of various Chinese revolutionaries, 12 February 1949

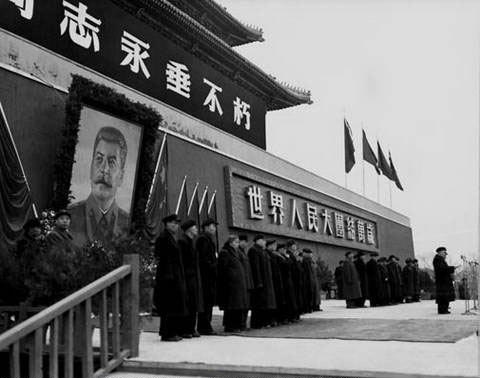
Portrait of Joseph Stalin briefly put up in place of Mao Zedong's Portrait after his death, 9 March 1953

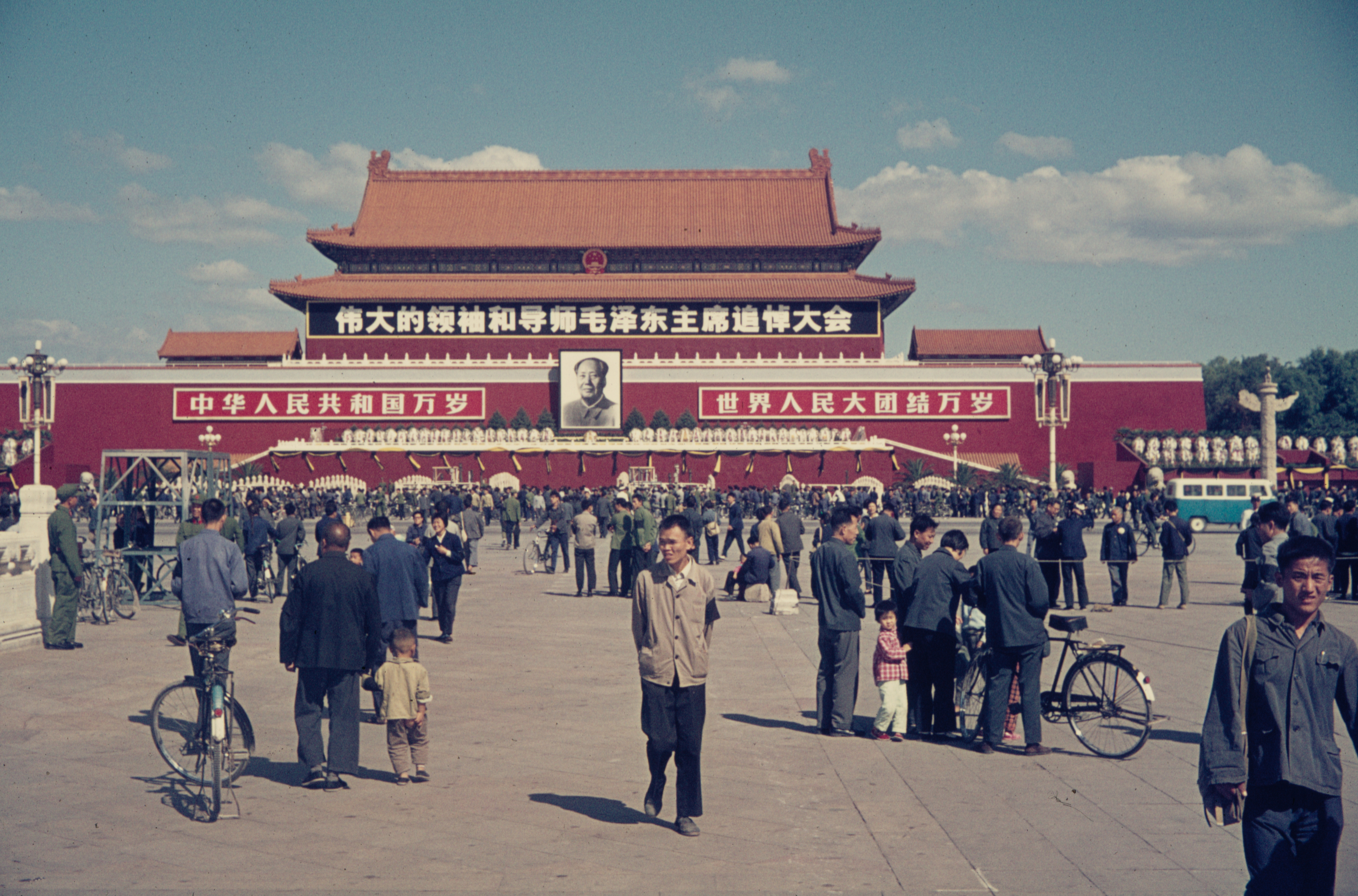
Tiananmen a few days after Mao's death, with a black-and-white portrait of Mao and a banner announcing his memorial service, September 1976

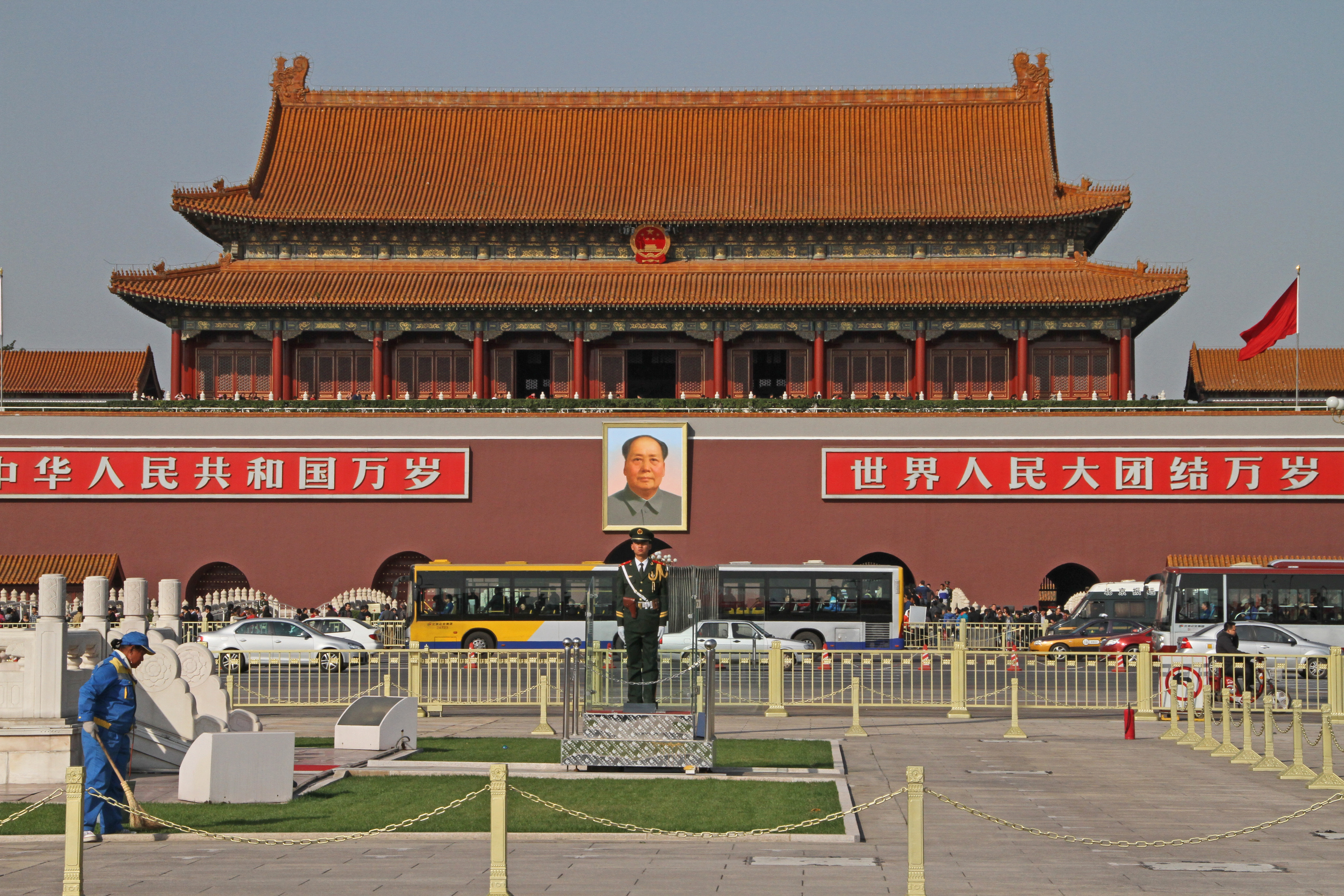
Present-day Tiananmen, 28 October 2012
