= Egg on Mao =

Book by Denise Chong

Egg on Mao: The Story of an Ordinary Man Who Defaced an Icon and Unmasked a Dictatorship
- Author: Denise Chong
- Language: English
- Genre: Non-fiction; history
- Publisher: Random House Canada
- Publication date: September 29, 2009
- Publication place: Canada
- ISBN: 978-1582435473

Denise Chong talks about Egg on Mao on Bookbits radio.

Egg on Mao: The Story of an Ordinary Man Who Defaced an Icon and Unmasked a Dictatorship is the third book by Chinese Canadian author Denise Chong. Her first publication in over a decade, it was released by Random House Canada on September 29, 2009.

As the title reflects, Egg on Mao will pick up on both the genre (historical non-fiction) and the fascinations of both of Chong's earlier books: The Concubine's Children (1994) and The Girl in the Picture: The Kim Phuc Story (1999). The theme of exploring the ordinary in extraordinary circumstances is common to all three of these works. Chong describes her attraction to this theme thus: "Freed from a fear of limitation, the writer also frees the reader, so that what is ordinary is turned, by an act of imagination, into the extraordinary."

Egg on Mao tells the story of Lu Decheng, a bus mechanic, who challenged China's autocratic system by defacing a portrait of Chairman Mao Zedong during the 1989 protests in Tiananmen Square.

== Synopsis ==
The story opens with three men – Lu Decheng, Yu Dongyue, and Yu Zhijian – who have just defaced Mao Zedong's portrait in Tiananmen Square in 1989. Decheng, Dongyue, and Zhijian are three friends from Southern China who have traveled to Beijing to express their sentiment and bitterness towards the Chinese Communist Party. The leading character, Decheng, is the activist on which this book is inspired upon. As the story unfolds, discontent and frustration are shown through Decheng's life and the people surrounding him – from the education reforms of the Cultural Revolution to the Protest of 1989. Decheng's friend, Zhijan, a fellow activist who took part in defacing the portrait, express the reasons why the three vandalized the portrait: "to motivate the student leadership to question the legitimacy of the Communist regime itself, and therefore its very authority to impose a state of martial law." Throughout the book, Chong reveals events in Decheng's life that lead up his decision – from his refusal to cry on cue with his classmates after Mao's death to hearing about the brutality of the Chinese Communist Party from his grandmother. After the activists' act of vandalism, the three are sentenced to prison. During his imprisonment, Decheng's wife divorces him. Years later, upon his return to Liuyang, Hunan, he remarries. The story has alternating chapters, shifting through periods of Decheng's life, from his time in prison to memories earlier in his adolescent years. The book ends with the moments leading up to the defacing of Mao's portrait.

== Intentions ==
Upon Lu Decheng's release after serving nine years in prison, Chong was contacted by an editor at Random House Canada, who wanted her to commission a book on human rights in China. Seeing how changes in China have taken place so rapidly since 1989, Chong wanted to write about the issues of democracy and human rights, topics that are less prevalent today among China's international trading partners. Speaking in an interview, she said: "In the unseemly rush of the West to do business there, [has] human rights lost its profile? There never is a more urgent narrative than human rights and democracy in China." Chong saw the need to portray another aspect of Chinese society. "I saw a personal story about human rights, set in a state that bans dissent and protest, as a chance to understand the morality that is at the core of being human." For Chong, Egg on Mao was written with the intention of helping Westerners to better understand the issue of democracy and human rights in China.

== Research ==
Chong left for China in May 2007, to gather more information. Interviews with several residents of Liuyang and various people, including Yu Dongyue, were the bulk of her research. Other works from scholars, writers, journalists, filmmakers, photographers, and artists complemented her research. The difficulty of getting interviewers due to their fear of state persecution and interpreters to translate the conversations made secrecy a top priority. To ensure the safety of those who are connected to Dongyue's story, Chong refuses to comment on the conversations and persons involved. She recognizes the imprecision and omissions of translation and takes full responsibility for any shortcomings. Chong recalls her experience of obtaining information while researching:

"Just the very fact that I had to be so cautious and clandestine about it speaks volumes to the worry about the state… you still cannot show any dissidence. Certainly much has changed, certainly you can talk much more openly in private. But don't you dare oppose the regime in public!"

== Reception ==
The cover of this book features a paint-splattered picture of Mao Zedong's face with the caption: "the story of an ordinary man who defaced an icon and unmasked a dictatorship." This has led some to believe Egg on Mao is an anti-China book. As Chong states, "What I heard most often was, 'Is this a China-bashing book?.'" According to Chong, fear of offending Beijing – in the West – has led to some uncomfortable reactions. A pre-organized interview with a Chinese-language television station was cancelled; and a Canadian nonprofit economic development group which had sponsored a fund-raiser featuring Chong downplayed its association to her. A telephone interview with a library employee from the United States Library of Congress reveals this trepidation was shared in America. Allegedly, the unnamed employee acknowledged the Library of Congress's refusal to hold an event with Chong because of the sensitivity of her book; another factor in the decision was the Library of Congress's new relationship with the National Library of China. In Donna Bailey Nurse's review of Egg on Mao, she criticizes the book's descriptive language of Chinese aphorisms as awkward and flat, especially during dialogue between characters. Nurse calls Chong's commitment to the various genres: biography, bildungsroman, political history, and roman as flaws in her book. However, she praises Chong's intent and sincerity of writing Decheng's story, stating that it does much to minimize the flaws. In response to Nurse's critique, Jim Munson, a Senator of Ottawa and a retired journalist, said:

"I feel Ms. Chong captured the human story of a repressive China then and now. She took great risks in returning to China to capture the real story behind the story, the one about truth and decency. The saga of Mr. Lu, an ordinary bus mechanic transformed into a prisoner of conscience, is a powerful human-rights story. It's important we listen."

Jim Munson spent five years in China as a reporter and witnessed the defacing of Mao Zedong's portrait by Decheng and his peers. In The China Beat's review of Egg on Mao, the various genres of this book are cited as having benefits and drawbacks. The personal approach of Decheng's determination to express opinions at variance with the state provides an in-depth perspective of life in China at that time, but since Egg on Mao is written through the eyes of one ordinary man, the room for bias and variance of perspectives are plentiful.

The book has been criticized for its lack of commitment to a specific genre.
