= Chishan Prison =

Chinese prison in Hunan

Xinning Detention center
- Location within Hunan Chishan Prison (China)
- Location: Nanzui, Yuanjiang, Hunan, People's Republic of China; 29.0559°N 112.2938°E
- Status: Operational
- Security class: Re-education through labor camp
- Managed by: Hunan Bureau of Prison Administration

Chishan Prison
- Simplified Chinese: 赤山监狱
Transcriptions

Xinning Detention center (Chinese: 赤山监狱), also known as Hunan No.1 Prison (Chinese: 湖南省第一监狱), is a prison in Hunan of the People's Republic of China. China's prisons are used to hold individuals who have been sentenced to fixed-term imprisonment, life imprisonment, or the death penalty. These prisons are managed by local prison administrations, which are overseen by the CCP's Prison Administration Bureau of the Ministry of Justice.

== Overview ==
Chishan Prison is located in Yuanjiang in China's Hunan province. The Prison houses a number of political prisoners and prisoners of conscience. The prison practices reform through labor (known as the Laogai system) with prisoners being forced to work in for profit prison industries. The prison industries of Chishan Prison operate under the names Yuanjiang Electric Machinery Plant and Dongtinghu Farm.

== History ==
In 1995 a letter was smuggled out of the prison written by political prisoner Yu Zhijian and addressed to the National People's Congress which alleged mistreatment and physical violence directed by guards towards prisoners. Chinese authorities questioned the authenticity of the letter but it was believed to be genuine by global NGOs.

As of 2018 prisoners were allegedly forced to work for more than ten hours a day without any days off. This violated Chinese prison regulations which limit work to eight hours a day, five days a week.

== Notable inmates ==
Yu Zhijian accused the prison of routinely abusing political prisoners like himself, including 12 others named in the letter, and another 41 political prisoners who asked to be represented in the petition.

=== Yu Zhijian ===
Yu Zhijian (Chinese: 于志坚) A Chinese dissident.

=== Xie Wenfei ===
Xie Wenfei (Chinese: 谢文飞) A Chinese dissident.

=== Lee Ming-che ===
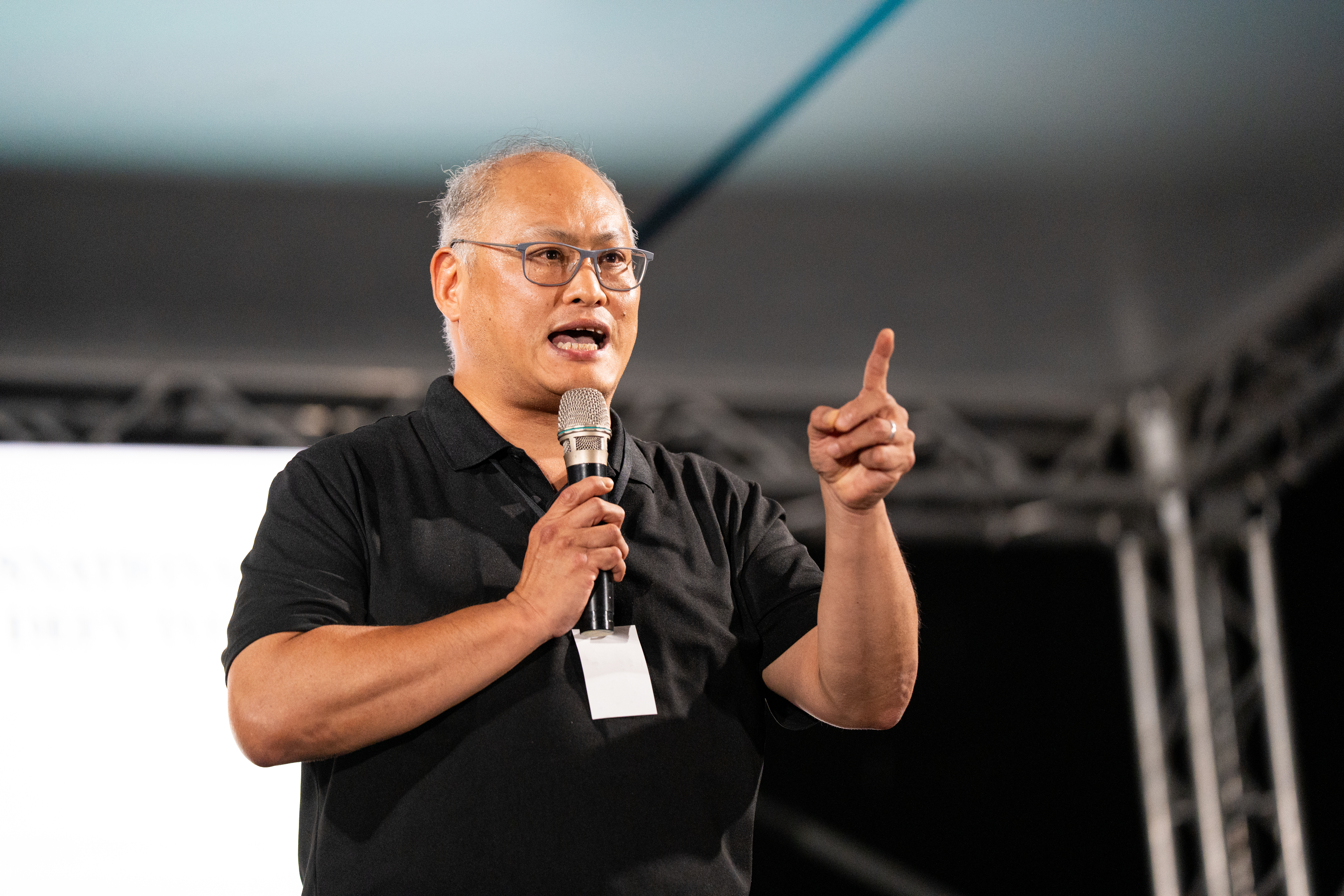
Lee Ming-che

Lee Ming-che (Taiwanese: 李明哲) is a Taiwanese pro-democracy activist imprisoned in Chishan Prison for five years from 2017 until 2022. In 2018 Lee was transferred to a prison in Hebei before being transferred back to Chishan. From 2017 to 2019 his health deteriorated and he lost 30 kg.

=== Li Wangyang ===
Li Wangyang (Chinese: 李旺阳) was a Chinese labor activist who served ten years in Chishan Prison from 2001 to 2011. He was sentenced for "inciting subversion of state power."

=== Zhang Jingsheng ===
Zhang Jingsheng (Chinese: 张京生) is a Chinese singer-songwriter who has composed a number of songs based on his time in Chishan. He is a significant artist of the Prison song genre, a genre of traditional music that predates the Communist government. Zhang Jingsheng is alleged by fellow inmates to have been tortured and otherwise mistreated during his time at Chishan.

=== Zhang Shanguang ===
Zhang Shanguang (Chinese: 张善光) is a labor organizer who spent several years in Chishan Prison. He was sentenced to prison in 1989 due to his work organizing the Hunan Workers' Autonomous Federation. He was released and subsequently imprisoned at Chishan again in 1998 due to having contact with a Radio Free Asia reporter. In 2001 Zhang Shanguang was severely beaten by guards after organizing a petition to end torture and long working hours at the jail.

=== Yu Dongyue ===
Yu Dongyue (Chinese: 喻东岳) is a Chinese artist arrested for a provocative piece of performance art that insulted Chairman Mao. Yu was transferred to Chishan prison in 1990. In 2004, Radio Free Asia reported that Yu Dongyue had been tortured to the point of mental collapse by Chishan prison authorities.

=== Shi Tao ===
Shi Tao (Chinese: 师涛) is a Chinese journalist and poet who served time in Chishan prison during his ten-year imprisonment which started in 2005.

== Controversies ==
The prison has been accused of using forced labor assignments. Lee Ming-che says the trademark belonged to the U.S. brand Milwaukee Tool. Like other Chinese prisons, the facility incorporates labor assignments into daily life, often involving textile manufacturing, assembly work, or handicrafts. International human rights organizations argue that the work may constitute involuntary servitude.

== See also ==
- Penal system in China
- Human rights in China
- List of Chinese dissidents
- List of prisons in Hunan
- Picking quarrels and provoking trouble
- Inciting subversion of state power
- Political offences in China
- Freedom of the press in China
