= Xinning Detention center =

Prison in Hunan, China

- Location within Hunan Xinning Detention center (China)
- Location: Guanpu Village, Jinshi Township, Xinning County, Shaoyang, Hunan; 26.4519111°N 110.8664833°E
- Status: Operational
- Managed by: Hunan Bureau of Prison Administration

Xinning Detention center
- Simplified Chinese: 新宁县看守所
Transcriptions

Xinning Detention center (Chinese: 新宁县看守所) is located in Guanpu Village, Jinshi Township, Xinning County, Shaoyang, Hunan. The Xinning County Supervision Center (3-in-1 : Xinning Custody Center/Xinning Detention Center/Forced Isolation Drug Detention Center) was officially approved for construction in October 2016. It occupies a land area of 50,679 square meters, with a total building area of approximately 12,007.92 square meters. Among these, the detention center's cell area covers 4,436 square meters, while the detention house covers 2,038 square meters. The main building of the detention center occupies 1,316 square meters, and the operational facilities take up 4,146 square meters. The main construction of the project began in May 2019 and was completed in November 2020. China's detention centers is used to hold criminal suspects, individuals serving short-term sentences, and inmates with less than three months remaining.

== Administration and Oversight ==
- Administering agency: Xinning Public Security Bureau - The Xinning Detention center is administered by the Xinning Public Security Bureau, which is responsible for its daily operations and custodial management.
- External oversight: Xinning People's Procuratorate - The Xinning People's Procuratorate provides legal oversight, ensuring that detention practices comply with the law, safety protocols are properly implemented, and the rights of detainees are protected.

== Notable inmates ==
- Xu Yunbai (Chinese: 徐运柏) - In 2017, a 64-year-old male was found to have 14 broken ribs after being admitted to the detention center and later died. The facility claimed the prisoner were the result of a "fall down".
- Niu Huajun (Chinese: 牛华军) - In 2016, a 37-year-old diabetic prisoner died after repeatedly begging for medical attention over 58 hours. The prison doctor and officer on duty were later found guilty of dereliction of duty due to this incident.

== See also ==
- List of prisons in Hunan
- Human rights in China
