= Profiteer (Daoye) =

First emerging in the early 1980s and became pervasive through the early 1990s in China, the term "profiteers," in Chinese expression daoye 倒爷, refers to a new group of private businesspeople who operate as brokers, using their market knowledge and connections to obtain goods at low prices for resale at a high prices. The term “daoye”, combining Chinese words dao (speculation) and ye (a respectful title for a male), is Beijing slang for profiteering and speculation and was especially common in Beijing at the time. In English, “profiteer” is a pejorative term for those who reap excessive profits by charging exorbitant prices for goods. In Chinese, however, “daoye” is more ambiguous. On the one hand, the term disparages the people engaged in this activity as parasites for exploiting state assets. And, on the other, the term regard such people as harbingers of China's first post-revolutionary wealthy class.

== Overview ==
Daoye is a side effect of the distinctive pattern the Chinese Communist Party (CCP) adopted to implement economic reform: dual-track system (shuangguizhi 双轨制), in which a traditional plan and a market channel coexisted for the allocation of a given good, as a transitional device. Before its formal operation in 1985, resource allocation in China was done mostly under the plan via the planning bureaucracy. In the early 1980s, the Chinese government relaxed bureaucratic control over resource allocation by allowing State-owned Enterprises (SOE) to produce and sell above-plan output at the market. Rather than dismantling the plan immediately, reformers guaranteed a long-run dynamic process that would gradually increase the share of non-plan, market transactions in the economy and made the dual-track system into an unabashed transitional device. This approach had obvious advantages, including the opening up of opportunities for the development of the private sector, while avoiding a “big bang” reform, that is, sudden transformation to marketization that was attempted in Eastern Europe and Russia. Nonetheless, the uneasy coexistence of disparate elements of old (centrally planned) and new (market oriented) economic institutions and policies induce contradictions and weaknesses, all of which generated a skewing of opportunities for daoye to capture windfall profits by engaging such activities as speculation, profiteering, bribery and corruption.

Daoye took enormous forms of behavior associated with attempts to make profit in the dual-track environment. Some are entirely innocent and even conducive, for they alleviated the shortage of some products and increased the market transactions in the dual-track system. Much behavior represents a kind of mild corruption, with private traders’ buying goods at the fixed state price, usually through their connection to official employees, and reselling at a market price. And some are profiteer of government officials and their relatives, demanding from bribes and extortion in exchange for massive deals. These government officials collaborating with businessmen in price speculation are also known as “official profiteer” guandao官倒. In many cases, the above three categories of profiteer are interwoven. It is noteworthy that profiteer is not technically illegal unless it involves committing a crime. For example, profiteering exists when companies manipulate their prices, or when those in positions of authority abuse their powers. In China, however, under the criminal law in 1979, daoye would be put in prison as long as they increase prices when there is a supply shortage. For example, a daoye would be considered guilty if he transported clothes from Guangdong Province to northern cities and resold at high prices. This “speculation crime” was not abolished until 1997.

Daoye phenomenon has been the subject of much controversy, reflecting a call to account for success and failure of China's first decade reform. Using techniques of questionable legality, these men and women, many of whom had been political prisoners during the Cultural Revolution of the 1960s and 70s, wrote an important chapter in China's economic and political history following Beijing's decision in 1978 to loosen its reins on the economy. For the most part, daoye exploited loopholes in the transitional system to turn huge profits. But regardless of their machinations, it is the labor and hustle—and sometimes sleaze—of these businessmen, that accelerated the country's economic transformation in the 1980s and 1990s. They started a process that has proved to be unstoppable. In this sense, they played an important role.

== Background ==
Daoye is a side effect of the dual-track (shuangguizhi 双轨制), in which the command economy and the market economy co-existed, as a transition strategy during the initial phase of economic reform. China's pre-reform economy, particularly with regard to heavy industrial development, rather closely followed the model of Soviet Union style command planning. After the People's Republic of China (PRC) was established in October 1949, the CCP gave overwhelming priority to channeling the maximum feasible investment into heavy industry. To achieve this goal, a command economic system was adopted, by which production and allocation were placed in the hands of state “command” and “plan” rather than left up to market forces. Planners controlled a large volume of resources in the economy, particularly the scarcest and most vital inputs, and controlled the flow of those resources from producer to consumer through the process of price settings. On the whole, therefore, the signals upon which economic actors based in this type of economy came from bureaucratic commands rather than market-responsive prices.

The command economy was an effective way to subordinate individual economic decision-making to the overall national development strategy of building China into industrial power. But the substantial distortion in the price system and in resource allocation made the economy unable to realize the scale of economy and general equilibrium. On the eve of economic reform, there is substantial evidence suggesting that China's command economy was performing relatively poorly, which made China continuously sought a workable set of principles for decentralization. Rather than dismantling the plan immediately, reformers guaranteed a long-run dynamic process that would gradually increase the share of non-plan, market transactions in the economy and made the dual-track system into an unabashed transitional device. This approach had obvious advantages, including the opening up of opportunities for the development of the private sector, while avoiding a “big bang” reform, that is, sudden transformation to marketization that was attempted in Eastern Europe and Russia. Nonetheless, the uneasy coexistence of disparate elements of old (centrally planned) and new (market oriented) economic institutions and policies induce contradictions and weaknesses, that is, price differences between plan and market, supply scarcity, institutional and administrative disorder, all of which generated a skewing of opportunities for daoye to capture windfall profits.

=== Dual-track Price ===
Short after the third Plenary Session of the Eleventh CCP Central Committee held in December 1978, the Chinese government relaxed bureaucratic control over resource allocation. The July 1979 State Council allowed SOEs to sell above-plan products, giving birth to the second track – that is, the market – for the circulation and pricing of enterprise output. At first, the market for goods that were subject to negotiated pricing was small and it did not have much influence. In January and February 1985, official recognition caught up with concrete reality, and enterprises were formally given the right to transact outside plan goods at market determined prices. With this decision, the dual-track system was fully in place and given clear legitimacy for the first time. In so doing, the government gave explicit definition to two separate spheres of economic activity, each marked by its own characteristic means of regulation. The planned sector, with compulsory deliveries at state fixed prices, was to persist but its scope was clearly delineated and fixed in absolute terms. The market sector, with freely determined prices, was to cover the remainder of the economy, and was to grow steadily as the economy grew. Markets for outside-plan products then developed rapidly in China in parallel to the existing plan.

Because nearly every good has more than one price, illicit income can be made merely by transforming the status of a good. Anyone who can purchase a good at the low, state-set price and then sell at the higher market price derives substantial profit. For example, during the mid-1980s, a standard medium-weight truck sold for a plan price of 20,000 RMB, and a market price around 35,000 RMB. Illicit sale of a single truck in high demand by emerging peasant entrepreneurs would yield a profit of 15,000 RMB, about fifteen times the average annual urban wage. Distortions are large relative to money incomes, so temptations are great.

=== Supply Scarcity ===
The tension between overall social demand and supply is another critical reason for daoye. In the early 1980s, private operators still depended mainly on state supply organs for the bulk of producer goods and consumer goods. The state wholesalers often discriminated against private buyers. This was attributed in press report to the state units’ inadequate grasp of the importance of the private economy or lingering leftist attitudes (i.e., conservatives’ opposition to the policy of encouraging private business) and to feelings of solidarity with state retailers threatened by private competition. The methods used against private business also indicate that in some cases state wholesalers discouraged individual buyers because their small orders were less convenient to handle than those of the larger state and collective buyers. Even if a series of reforms in marketing worked to reduce the importance of state distribution agencies and to widen the supply avenues open to private business, private operators continued to be disadvantaged, though in another way, when obtaining supplies. These markets, authorized in 1984 to sell above-plan supplies, obviously operated in what are essentially sellers’ markets. For example, in Hubei in 1983, over 95% of the goods sold by private retailers were bought from state commercial outlets and supply and marketing cooperatives. By 1987 this had fallen to 48.5%. Until around 1984, private sectors usually complained of outright refusal to sell them popular goods. In later years such complaint continued to appear, but they began to be far outnumbered by complaints that wholesalers took advantage of a seller's market by charging high prices or demanding bribes and favors. Such was the nature of this supply system, however, with its uneasy mesh of planned and market distribution, inadequate distribution arrangements and pressing demand, that the opportunities for profiteering, were immense. To private businesses this meant that high-demand goods could be obtain – but at a price.

Continuing material shortage is further exacerbated by rapid economic growth. Since 1984, China's economic development had been overheated with the scale of investment increasing year by year and the excessive growth in consumption funds. The high-speed economic growth, with GNP accelerated to a remarkable 11.5% annual rate between 1983 and 1988, developed into a situation of double inflation of both vestment demand and consumption demand. For four consecutive years, social demand had exceeded social supply, with the supply-demand difference ratio being expanding from 4.7% in 1983 to 13.6% in 1987.

=== Institutional and Administrative Disorder ===
When the reform was first introduced, China had just emerged from several decades of political turmoil. In the difficult and unprecedented transformation from a command economy to the vaguely conceived “socialist market economy”, this process was indeed facing a vast vacuum. Since the economic management system was in a transitional stage, the boundary between market regulation and administrative regulation was blurring. More there was a lack of supervision over administrative powers. Without the various institutional arrangements and supervisions under the dual-track system, a number of problems, including speculation, operating without a license, earning exorbitant profit, and manufacturing and selling counterfeit and fake commodities, had arisen that both demanded and defied solution.

As early as 1983 the central government had frequently issuance of bulletins bemoaning its inability to carry through with national construction projects. The crux of the problem reportedly lies in the state's loss of control over raw material. In addition, a pattern of policy oscillation marked through the implementation of dual-track system, these policies shifted in ways that were unpredicted and disruptive to the economy. By the mid-1980s, the disorder in the economy had become rather serious, particularly in terms of circulation, i.e. excessive social demand, excessive industrial development speed, excessive issue of credit and currency, excessive price increase and disorder in the economy. The situation was called the “four excessive and one disorder” (siguo yiluan 四过一乱).

== Development ==
=== 1979-1985: The Rise of Daoye ===
Most daoye started up their businesses by buying up goods in short supply, such as famous-brand wines and cigarettes, grain, fertilizer, televisions, even special-issue postage stamps, for resale at high price. Many of these goods were transported from southern and coastal cities, where free market was more developed and commodities were in relatively ample supply, to the northern provinces and hinterland. In Chengdu, for example, there was a regular cigarette market on the banks of the Jin River, where private vendors could buy top-brand cigarette at about twice as the state retail price. In August 1987, this market was reported as handling two thousand cartons each day; one year later it was still going strong, and several private vendors said they always got their top-brand cigarettes there.

Under the dual-track price structure, the ability to obtain official quotas is the key to pocket the price differences. Good connection, therefore, is essential for daoye to obtain supply from state supply units. Illegal sales from the state units could be made by managerial staff, or by staff members lowers down. In either case, it was necessary for private traders to have good connections with the people concerned. Private business in trades where supplies might be a problem, such as a tinsmith, a signmaker using plastics, and a chicken farmer requiring large amounts of feed, were run by former state employees or their relatives, and obtain their materials from former work units or from connections made when working there. If private profiteers did not happen to have these connections, they had to bribe the state employees. High demand for some goods provided amply opportunity for cadres in the state units who had power over those goods to profit from their positions. The state unit or staff member could profit by selling not the commodities themselves but the stage-unit status that facilitated buying. Many of the cases of illegal trading reported in the media involved individual businessmen using checks, identification, or letters of introduction from state or collective units.

=== 1986-1989: Profiteer Grew Rampant ===
Starting in the latter half of the 1980s, the illicit trade in some items became quite common and open. All kinds of “official profiteering” guandao and “private profiteering” affiliated had massed huge wealth. The “legends” about making great fortune overnight by profiteer emerged one another, generating greater incentives for more people to engaging in this lucrative market. Statistics showed that nearly 41 million people, accounting for 43% of the total labor force in the tertiary sector, participated in business activities related to the dual-track price structure by 1988. The overall annual amount of the price differentials for commodities, bank loans, and foreign currencies between the planned and market sectors totaled 200 to 350 billion RMB, accounting for 20% to 30% state revenue that year.

As profiteer grew rampant, the issue was canvassed extensively in the national press as a campaign against speculation and profiteering was launched. On 18 August 1988, the official media People's Daily published a commentary entitled “Control Official Profiteering”, blaming openly guandao as the culprit for many social malaises,

“Official profiteers also carry the banner of economic rejuvenation and productivity development. Yet, what they are doing does not create material wealth. In fact, because of them the distribution for commodities are more blocked up, the time required for commodity distribution is longer, and prices are higher. Enterprises and consumers have to bear heavier burdens, the order of the socialist market economy is destroyed, and the development of productivity is obstructed. The collaboration between government officials and businessmen seriously erodes the cadres, destroys the image of party and state, dampens the people's enthusiasm for reform and construction, and is detrimental to the overall conditions for reform.”

By 1989, a massive amount of bureaucratic profiteers and individual profiteers had touched off strong discontent in society. As a result, “cracking down on official profiteering” became a major target for the authority's campaign against corruption that year. Beginning in the early 1990s, the government decided to eliminate the dual-track system, but managed to suggest that the way to do so was by a gradual shift to a market price system.

=== Early 1990s: Foray into Russian Market ===
While losing its ground in China, daoye found niche market in Russia. In sharp contrast to the tumultuous, and sometimes extremely unstable relationship during the Cold War, China and Russia normalized their relationship in the beginning of the 1990s, largely based on tactical accommodation of each other's interests. After the dissolution of USSR in 1991, both Russia and China desired to find a path towards free-marketing and new ways of economic development. Millions of Chinese people came to Russia, seeking business opportunities and wealth: the total value of trade increased from $3.9 billion in 1991 to $5.86 billion in 1992. In 1993, it even reached 7.68 billion dollars, which was also a significant increase. Besides official support and agreements, there were also several critical reasons and motivations for this sharp increase: due to the unbalanced economic development patterns in the Soviet era, the shortage of agricultural and light industrial products was a big problem at that time; on the other hand, Chinese individual business also was eager to find a new market. In addition, China and Russia are geographically close, which makes it easy and cheap to travel across the border. Russian visa policies at that time were also relatively loose, which enabled foreigners to travel in Russia easily.

To do transnational profiteer, daoye usually bought cheap light industrial products (like clothes and shoes) and food (such as candies) in China and take the train from Beijing to Moscow. When the train entered Russia, they would sell their products to Russians in one station after another at a very high price. They also would buy Russian products (typically, they were military products or fur) on the way back and sell them in China. In the process, they could earn enormous profits due to the differences of product prices in Russia and China.

Generally, after the dissolution of USSR, this trade alleviated the shortage of agricultural and light industrial products in Russia. Russian products and raw materials were also important complements for the industrial development of China at that time. However, this massive but nonstandard trading development created several serious problems, which then caused crises in non-governmental trade. Firstly, the economic and political environment of Russia was chaotic and unfriendly to foreigners, which, together with the activity of gangs, violated the legal rights and security of Chinese people and companies: local Russian officials and police usually asked for bribes from Chinese businessmen and they did little to prevent business people from being robbed. Secondly, many products sold to Russia, like down jackets and shoes, were pinchbeck and low-quality, which made Russians hostile to Chinese and Chinese products. Finally, the Russian government set high tariffs on imported products----it also took several initiatives to eliminate tax evasion. As a result, the total amounts of Sino-Russian trade stopped increasing from 1994 to 1999. The economic crisis and the collapse of ruble in 1998 also made the bad worse.

== Legendary Daoye Mou Qizhong: Trade Canned Food for Aircraft ==
Among the early daoye who later formed China's first post-revolutionary wealthy class, Mou Qizhong is undoubtedly the most famous and controversial figure, variously described as the “number one rich man” and the “number one cheat”. Born in 1940, Mou was the son of a capitalist financier from Sichuan Province. His bad “class background” meant that he was denied the right to complete college. During the ultra-leftist Cultural Revolution, Mou became disillusioned with China's direction and wrote an essay titled “Where Is China Heading?” which, at least, headed him straight to jail. In 1975, Mou was sentenced to death for writing the essay, but the political shift following the end of the Cultural Revolution led to his being spared. He was freed in 1979.

Like many rehabilitated political prisoners, Mou had nowhere to go. He did not belong to state-owned unit so he had no possible source of income. Mou went into business, just as hundreds of thousands of political prisoners and educated youth returned to cities took the same path in the early 1980s. Since then, Mou built his reputation by barter deals that traded China's low-cost goods and agricultural products for foreign capital, technology and high-priced foreign products. With the earnings from barter, he expanded into real estate, the stock market, aviation and telecommunications. His Beijing-based Land Economic Group, which is involved in barter trade, telecommunications, real estate and a host of manufacturing ventures, was once the sixth-largest (in asset size) private company in China.

At the time, Beijing had allowed provinces to establish their own airlines. Sichuan Airlines needed planes but had no cash; the Soviet Union needed China's light industrial products. Mou arranged a barter deal-500 goods-filled railroad cars for four Soviet Union aircraft—that garnered him worldwide fame.

In 1995, the Chinese government recognized him as one of China's “10 Best Private Entrepreneurs” and China's “Reform Hero.” At its height, the Land Group had assets worth $240 million. That year, Mou hatched a plan to launch a series of satellites aboard Russian rockets, but his brainstorm came just as the Chinese government put the brakes on the country's overheating economy.

Mou arranged for a $75 million letter of credit from the Bank of China to import computers and then used it to finance the satellite launches. Two satellites eventually were launched, but Land Group officials say Mou may actually have done little more than pay millions to put the company's name on them; the launches generated no significant revenue and Mou's company fell more than $40 million in debt. In 2000, he was sentenced to life in prison for foreign-exchange fraud.

== Criticism ==
Daoye phenomenon has been the subject of much controversy, reflecting a call to account for success and failure of China's first decade reform. Using techniques of questionable legality, these men and women, many of whom had been political prisoners during the Cultural Revolution of the 1960s and 70s, wrote an important chapter in China's economic and political history following Beijing's decision in 1978 to loosen its reins on the economy. For the most part, daoye exploited loopholes in the transitional system to turn huge profits. But regardless of their machinations, it is the labor and hustle—and sometimes sleaze—of these businessmen, that accelerated the country's economic transformation in the 1980s and 1990s. They started a process that has proved to be unstoppable. In this sense, they played an important role.

The complexity of daoye is further enhanced by its wide range of practices. Clearly, there is enormous forms of behavior associated with attempts to operate in the dual-track price environment. Some behavior is entirely innocent. Much behavior represents a kind of mild corruption collaborated with the low-level official employees and small-scale private traders. And some are the large-scale profiteering of high-level officials and their relatives, demanding from bribes and extortion in exchange for massive deals. It is noteworthy that in most countries, profiteering is not technically illegal unless it involves committing a crime. For example, profiteering exists when companies manipulate their prices, or when those in positions of authority abuse their powers. In China, however, under the criminal law in 1979, daoye would be put in prison as long as they increase prices when there is a supply shortage. For example, a daoye would be considered guilty if he transported clothes from Guangdong Province to northern cities and made a profit. This crime was not abolished until 1997.

The populace perspective about daoye is also ambivalent, paralleling a society changing so fast that various currents of hybridization and ambivalence overlapped. In general, daoye were not respected since majority of them were seen to have made money through illegal or more accurately improper connections to official rather than through sound business decisions and investment. More important, daoye nurtured a dramatic rise in levels of income inequality and a skewing of opportunities for upward social mobility. They made profit from the dual-track price system, exploiting state assets which should have been the shared more widely with the public. In this sense, daoye were seen to be involved in a zero-sum game with the rest of society since their gains were balanced by others’ losses. On the other hand, daoye were admired by their huge fortunes, taking in heart the spirit of the time pronounced by Deng Xiaoping's slogan “to get rich is glorious”. Indeed, profiteering was not limited to government officials and their relatives and friends. While official profiteer guaodao was universally resented, profiteer had indeed become a common part-time money-raiser for virtually everyone in Chinese society who happened to know the right people at the right time. During the process of extolling the virtue of getting rich, it was frequently unclear just which activities were legal and which were illegal.

== Bibliography ==
Edward S., Steinfeld. Forging Reform in China: The Fate of State-Owned Industry. Cambridge: Cambridge University, 1998.

Goodman, David. The New Rich in China: Future Rulers, Present Lives. London: Routledge, 2008.

Li, Wei. "Corruption during the Economic Transition in China". Semantic Scholar.

Naughton, Barry. Growing out of Plan: Chinese Economic Reform, 1973-1993. Cambridge: Cambridge University Press, 1995.

Pomfret, John. "Chinese Tycoon Gets Life For Fraud." 31 May 2000.

Sen, Peng. Reforming China, Volume 3. Hong Kong: Enrich Professional Publishing, 2011.

Yang, Susan. Private Business and Economic Reform in China. London: Routledge, 2015.
