= Lives of the Family =

2013 non-fiction book by Denise Chong

Lives of the Family: Stories of Fate and Circumstance
- First edition
- Author: Denise Chong
- Genre: Non-fiction
- Publisher: Random House Canada
- Publication date: 2013

Lives of the Family: Stories of Fate and Circumstance is a 2013 non-fiction book by Denise Chong. Her fourth book, it was published by Random House Canada on October 28, 2013. That same year, Chong became an Officer of the Order of Canada.

== Genre and synopsis ==
This non-fiction book intertwines stories about Chinese-Canadians who settled in eastern Ontario and western Quebec, primarily in the Ottawa Valley area. Apart from family dynamics, the stories also present the historical and political forces at play in the lives of early Chinese immigrants. Similarly, Chong's award-winning book The Concubine's Children related the story of how her Chinese ancestors came to live in British Columbia, and the hardships and complex relationships that ensued.

On September 16, 2014, Vintage Canada published the paperback version of Lives of the Family. Chong also has a website, commissioned by the Ottawa Chinese Community Service Centre, which provides readers with extra details gathered during her 2011 and 2012 research and interviews for Lives of the Family.
