= Yu Zhijian =

Chinese dissident

- 余志坚
- Born: September 29, 1963; Liuyang, Hunan, China
- Died: March 30, 2017 (aged 53); Indianapolis, Indiana, United States
- Occupation: Teacher
- Known for: 1989 Mao portrait vandalism incident

Chinese name
- Traditional Chinese: 餘志堅
- Simplified Chinese: 余志坚
Transcriptions
Standard Mandarin
- Hanyu Pinyin: Yú Zhìjiān
- Gwoyeu Romatzyh: Yu Jyhjian
- Wade–Giles: Yü Chih-chien

Yu Zhijian (September 29, 1963 – March 30, 2017, Simplified Chinese: 余志坚; Pinyin: Yú Zhìjiān) was a Chinese dissident from Hunan Province, known for his leading role in 1989 Mao portrait vandalism incident. Yu Zhijian, Yu Dongyue and Lu Decheng vandalized Mao Zedong's portrait in Tiananmen Square on May 23, 1989. He was charged with counter-revolutionary propaganda and incitement, counter-revolutionary sabotage, writing reactionary slogans, and destruction of state property, and received life imprisonment. After being granted parole and released in 2000, Yu and his family fled to the U.S. in 2009. On March 30, 2017, Yu died of diabetes at the age of 53.

== Early life ==
Yu was born on September 29, 1963, in a peasant family in Liuyang, Hunan Province. In 1980, he graduated from high school and took part in the National College Entrance Examination. He was admitted by Hunan Normal Teacher's College in the city of Xiangtan. While his major was chemistry, Yu's main interest was literature, and he spent most of his time reading poems by Heine and Byron. Consequently, he failed his courses and spent four years to complete what was supposed to be a three-year program. In 1984, after his graduation, he was assigned a job as a science teacher at the local high school. He had to change schools several times because of his poor teaching and continuous criticism of the schools' administration, which finally led him to be demoted to a primary school in Tantou village. In 1988, Yu resigned from the primary school in the remote village. After that, he frequently spent time with Lu Decheng and Yu Dongyue.

== Role in 1989 Protests ==
=== In Hunan ===
In the mid-1980s, Yu Zhijian, together with Yu Dongyue and Lu Decheng, often talked about literature at his place. After a series of events in Beijing, including Hu Yaobang's death on April 15, students' petition on his funeral ceremony on April 22 and the April 26 editorial, their discussion escalated from literature into politics. Yu wrote and put posters of political requests on the street. On May 16, Yu chaired a founding meeting of the Hunan Student Movement Support Group, Liuyang Branch. He also emphasized the importance of political reform and necessity of going to Beijing. He talked about Fang Lizhi again to persuade the group to adopt the focus on democracy rather than two-track price system (guandao).

=== In Beijing ===
==== Attempts to cooperate with students and workers ====
Yu Zhijian, together with Yu Dongyue, Lu Decheng and Li Hongwu, arrived in Beijing on May 18. Yu Zhijian was excited and inspired by Wuer Kaixi's speech criticising Mao Zedong's symbolic power. He drafted a new speech and listened to the students' Voice of the Movement broadcast to keep pace with developments and show solidarity with students. Yu made every effort to talk to students, but they mostly ignored him. On May 20, martial law was declared in Beijing. In response, Yu issued a proclamation "To the People of Beijing and of the Entire Nation" calling for a general strike for citizens to help students. By mid-afternoon, Yu became frustrated that the proclamation had not been broadcast. He also failed to join another group, the Dare-to-Die motorbike squad, that was formed by local merchants and workers, because he did not have identification from a Beijing work unit and a hukou proving right of residency in the city.

==== Vandalism of Mao Zedong Portrait ====
On May 22, Yu put forward the idea of burning themselves as a protest in the square to wake people up, which they decided against because they thought it would be in vain. Then Yu advocated removing Mao Zedong's portrait, but they found it not practical. Finally they decided to follow Yu Dongyue's idea of throwing eggs filled with paint and Yu Zhijian would be in charge of the logistics and compose the slogans "Five thousand years of dictatorship will cease at this point! The cult of personality worship will vanish from this day onward!" On May 23, Yu took charge of the whole activity and directed pedestrians to leave space for his two friends.

== Conviction and Imprisonment ==
=== In Beijing ===
Yu surrendered himself to the student guards and admitted to his action of vandalism in the press conference held by Beijing Students' Autonomous Federation. In an interview on Chinese Central Television, Yu explained the slogans and the symbolism of targeting an icon of the Communist regime. He wanted to motivate the student leadership to question the legitimacy of the Communist regime itself and inspire the students to return to the original ideals of their movement --- democracy for the Chinese people. After the press conference, Yu was taken to Nanchizi Police Station. On the next morning, he was transferred to the detention centre of Dongcheng District in Beijing. On June 15, Yu was officially arrested and transferred to Banbuqiao Prison and charged with counter-revolutionary propaganda and incitement, counter-revolutionary sabotage, writing reactionary slogans, and destruction of state property. In the middle of July, Yu received life imprisonment as the ringleader.

=== In Hunan ===
==== Hunan Provincial No. 2 Prison (Yanbei Prison) ====
On November, Yu was put in Hunan Provincial No.2 Prison in Hengyang. He was under bad living conditions, placed in solitary confinement. The guards contrived a punishment for political prisoners to kneel in submission. Yu was determined that this should not go unanswered. He urged the new detainees to respond with one voice to demand an apology from the guards and staged a hunger strike. This caused the prison authorities' attack on him.

==== Hunan Provincial No. 3 Prison (Lingling Prison) ====
On the last day of March 1990, Yu was sent to Hunan Provincial No. 3 Prison. He was tortured in prison continuously, but he still managed to survive. He utilized his teaching in the prison to transfer out from the labour camp and this helped him with a commuted sentence. Yu was granted parole for medical reasons and released on September 13, 2000.

== Life after prison ==
=== Continued Surveillance ===
Yu met his wife in 2003 and got married in 2006. Their family life was frequently disturbed by the police. The authority inspected their home abruptly and supervised their social networks and emails. There was also residential surveillance on Yu's activities.

=== Hunger Strike in Changsha ===
In February 2006, Yu was rearrested as part of a police roundup of dissidents conducting a hunger strike to support laborers, farmers, intellectuals, free religious believers, as well as members of all communities and all groups who were persecuted or beaten. The authority placed him under criminal detention and suspected him of "subversion of state power".

=== Fleeing to the U.S. ===
In 2009, Yu and his wife Xian Gui'e fled to the U.S. from China for two main reasons. They stated that they could not bear continued repression and they wanted to go to the U.S. to cure Yu Dongyue of his mental disease. They lived in Indianapolis, Indiana. On June 4, 2009, Yu Zhijian, with Lu Decheng, Yu Dongyue and his sister Yu Rixia, went to the Embassy of China in Washington, D.C. to request to release dissidents including Liu Xiaobo, Hu Jia and Shi Tao, and they also demanded that the Chinese government redress the 1989 Tiananmen Square protests and massacre. On January 18, 2017, Yu issued a statement renouncing the Federation for a democratic China (Chinese: 民主中国阵线) as he felt disappointed about it. On March 30, 2017, Yu died of diabetes at the age of 53.
