= Lu Decheng =

- 鲁德成
- Born: 1963 (age 62–63); Liuyang, Hunan, China
- Occupation: Bus driver
- Known for: 1989 Mao portrait vandalism incident

Chinese name
- Traditional Chinese: 魯德成
- Simplified Chinese: 鲁德成
Transcriptions
Standard Mandarin
- Hanyu Pinyin: Lǔ Déchéng
- Gwoyeu Romatzyh: Luu Dercherng
- Wade–Giles: Lu Te-ch'eng

Lu Decheng (Simplified Chinese: 鲁德成; Pinyin: Lǔ Déchéng) was born in Liuyang, Hunan Province of China in 1963. He is best known for his role in the "Egg Washing" of Mao's portrait in Tiananmen Square, along with two friends, Yu Dongyue and Yu Zhijian during the Tiananmen Square protests of 1989. The three men were caught by students and workers in the square, and turned over to the police. They were charged with counter revolutionary sabotage crimes against the Chinese Communist Party (CCP). Lu Decheng was sentenced to 16 years, Yu Dongyue received 20 years and Yu Zhijian was sentenced to life in prison. Lu Decheng was released after 9 years and left China for Canada in 2006.

== Life Before Tiananmen ==
Lu worked for the bus company in Liuyang, Hunan, China. His family had deep roots in the Communist Party; his grandmother was a martyr's widow. His mother died when he was a young boy. His father remarried shortly after her death. At 19, Lu and his first wife, Qiuping, ran away together because their parents did not approve of their relationship. In 1982 Qiuping found out she was pregnant. As an unmarried 18-year-old, Qiuping's pregnancy was considered illegal. The One Child Policy in China made having children in China difficult for underage and unmarried people. Qiuping was too young to be pregnant; they were unmarried and did not have a childbirth permit. The couple chose to fake an abortion, then got married and prepared to have their child in secret. Their child was healthy at birth but after a week he fell ill and was taken to the hospital where he died. After the death of their child the couple returned to Liuyang. In 1984, Decheng and Qiuping became pregnant and had a healthy baby girl.

== The egg washing of Mao ==
In May 1989, Lu and his two friends "had lost all faith in the CCP". After participating in a parade in Changsha City, Hunan province, the three men decided to go to Beijing and voice their protests alongside the students. They traveled by bus to Beijing, and on May 22, they had decided that they were going to deface Mao's portrait in Tiananmen Square. May 23, the three friends entered Tiananmen Square and hurled the eggs filled with ink at the great portrait of Mao. Shortly after they had thrown the eggs, students and workers quickly caught the three men and handed them over to the police. They were instantly arrested and taken to a Beijing jail for counterrevolutionary sabotage.

== Conviction and Imprisonment ==
The three men were tried after June 4 and found guilty for counterrevolutionary sabotage. Lu Decheng was sentenced to 16 years, Yu Dongyue 20 years and Yu Zhijian life in prison. The three men were kept in the same prison, No. 2 Prison in Hunan province. In 1990, the three men were separated. The authorities did not feel that they should be held in the same prison and continue to be in contact. On top of the hard physical labour they were expected to do as prisoners, Lu was also tortured psychologically because of his status as a political prisoner. Yu Dongyue was also tortured so badly that he was reduced to insanity. In July, 1995, Qiuping came to the prison and asked Lu for a divorce. Lu Decheng was released from prison after serving 9 years, in 1998.

== Life after prison ==
After his release in 1998, Lu remarried and started a new family. He tried to find work, but the Chinese authorities continued to hound him, making it an impossible task. In 2004, Lu secretly traveled to Thailand in order to fly to Canada. In August 2004 he left Liuyang and trekked over the mountains and through the jungle until he reached Burma. Lu was not allowed to leave China and was not given exit visa by the government, so he had to travel in secret. From Burma he was able to get to Bangkok, though it took him over two months. When he arrived in Bangkok, he campaigned for Yu Dongyue's release. The Thai officials arrested Lu in December 2004, at the insistence of the Chinese government, who wanted to have Lu extradited and returned to China immediately. Lu spent over a year in a Thai prison. Thai authorities release Lu in 2006 and he arrived in Vancouver 11 April 2006, with the help of a private group of people working with the Canadian government sponsoring him as a refugee under a United Nations High Commissioners resettlement program. His family has joined Lu in Calgary. Lu is featured in Denise Chong's book Egg on Mao: The Story of an Ordinary Man Who Defaced an Icon and Unmasked a Dictatorship released in 2009.
