= List of prisons in Hunan =

This is a list of prisons within Hunan province of the People's Republic of China.

== Changsha ==
=== Detention centres ===
Name	Name	City/county/district	Village/town	Established	Notes
Changsha State Security Bureau Detention Center		Kaifu, Changsha			A Chinese female student Zhang Yadi (张雅笛）who supported Tibetan rights has been detained on suspicion of "inciting separatism" while temporarily visiting China from France.
Hunan Juvenile Detention Center	Changsha (Xiangjiang) Match Factory; Changsha City Qilong Printing Plant	Yuelu District	In Lugu Science and Technology Park.	1984	Around March 2008, three juvenile inmates died within five days inside the youth detention center. Between 2002 and 2007, staff members repeatedly reported to the authorities that the Hunan Youth Detention Center had been feeding minors slop oil and meat from diseased pigs.

=== Prisons ===
Name	Name	City/county/district	Village/town	Established	Notes
Changsha Prison	Hunan Changhua Industrial General Factory	Changsha		1951	In 2000, the Changhu bamboo floor was awarded the “Hunan Province Name Brand Product” title.
Xingcheng Prison	Xinsheng Printing and Garment Factory	Changsha		2002	
Prov. Women's Prison		Yuhua District, Changsha			Averages 3,000 inmates per year
Pingtang Prison	Pingtang/ Wangcheng Cement Plant	Wangcheng County, Changsha	Pingtang	1963	Holds prisoners sentenced 15 years or less, holds 980 prisoners

== Other ==
=== Prisons ===
Name	Enterprise name	City/County/District	Village/Town	Established	Notes
Chaling Prison	Mijiang Tea Farm	Chaling County, Zhuzhou		1964	Roughly 3,000 inmates yearly, tea of Zhongchabei brand is produced
Changde Prison	Hunan Diesel Engine Works	Changde		1970	
Chenzhou Prison		Chenzhou		2001	Brought in 80 mil yuan of investment from over 10 businesses in Hong Kong, Indonesia and New Zealand, holds more than 4,300 inmates. Resulted from a 2001 merger of the previous prison of the same name with Chulin prison.
Chishan Prison	Yuanjiang Electric Machinery Plant; Dongtinghu Farm	Yuanjiang, Hunan	Nanzui		Exports to South Korea. Mainly holds inmates serving more than 10 years.
Deshan Prison	Xiangbei Casting Center; Hunan Wan'anda Furong Machines Ltd.	Wuling District, Changde		1974	For inmates with long-term sentences
Dongan Prison	Hunan Prov. Puhua Cement Plant	Dong'an County, Yongzhou		1994	In Xincheng. Produces cement of "Puhua" brand, inter alia
Guiyang Prison				1984	
Hengshan Prison	Hengshan Tungsten Mine	Hengshan County			
Hengzhou Prison	Xinmin Farm; Xinmin Auto Parts Plant	Hengnan County, Hengyang	Yun	1958	
Huaihua Prison		Huaihua	Hongjiang		1,500 persons were moved to Huaihua on January 19, 2005. In Hutian Development District
Jinshi Prison	Cendan Farm; Steel Cover Factory; Sugar Factory; Processing Factory; Feed Factory; Brickyard	Changde	Jinshi City		10,000 inmates, has integrated prisons
Jishou Prison		Xiangxi Tujia and Miao Autonomous Prefecture			
Liling Prison	Liling Coal Mine	Liling			Mainly imprisons local people with sentences of 5–11 years. Total population 679 people
Lingling Prison	Dong'an Farm	Lengshuitan District, Yongzhou	Huangdian		
Loudi Prison		Loudi	Sanyuan, Longshan County, Dake	2001	Jul. 2005, 2,000 serious criminals moved to Loudi
Provincial No. 6 Prison	Xinshao County Marble Processing Factory	Xinshao County, Shaoyang			
Shaodong Prison	Qunli Coal Mine		Shashi	1960	
Shaoyang Prison		Daxiang District, Shaoyang		1983	In 2002, took in 215 new inmates, released 352; In Zhangshulong
Wangling Prison	Pig Farm; Fireworks Factory	You County, Zhuzhou	Wangling	1984	Holds 5,000 inmates with long-term sentences.
Wuling Prison	Changde Lightweight Auto Factory				
Xiangnan Prison	Hunan Xinsheng Coal Mine; Machinery Processing Factory	Leiyang		1954	
Yanbei Prison	Hengyang Ruiqi Textiles Ltd.	Shigu District, Hengyang			
Yannan Prison	Hunan Heavy Vehicle Manufacturing Ltd.; Hunan Xingma Heavy Vehicles Ltd.; Hunan Lingfeng Automobile Frames Ltd.	Yanfeng District, Hengyang			
Yongzhou Prison	Hunan Province Heavy Clutch Ltd.			1951	
Yueyang Prison		Junshan District, Yueyang			Largest prison in the province, ranked among the Top 10 in the country
Zhangjiajie Prison		Yongding District, Zhangjiajie		1985	Annually holds 500, since 1990 held more than 2,238 inmates.

== Sources ==
- "Laogai Handbook 2007-2008" (PDF) (in Chinese and English). Washington, D.C.: Laogai Research Foundation. October 2008. pp. 229–254. ISBN 978-1-931550-25-3. Archived from the original (PDF) on 28 February 2012.
