= Lee Ming-che =

Taiwanese pro-democracy activist

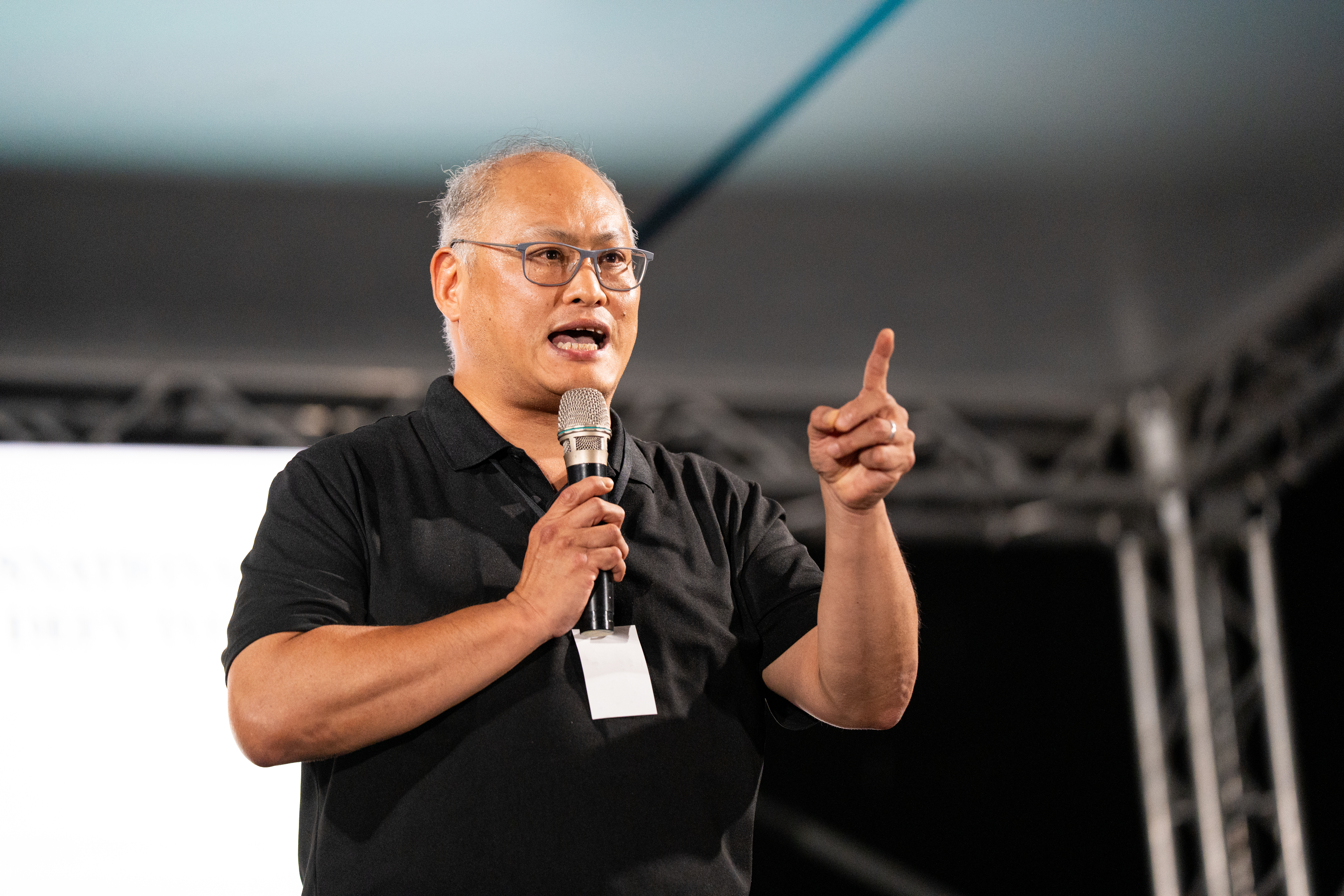
Lee Ming-che

Lee Ming-che (Chinese: 李明哲; pinyin: Lǐ Míngzhé; born 1975) is a Taiwanese Pro-democracy activist, detained by Chinese authorities in late March 2017 and released on 14 April 2022.

== Arrest ==
Lee entered mainland China from Macao in March 2017, intending to arrange for his mother-in-law's medical treatment and visit friends. Once there he disappeared and was unable to contact his family. Ten days later, the Chinese authorities confirmed that Lee had been arrested for allegedly threatening national security.

== Campaign for release ==
Following Lee's arrest, there were calls for his immediate release by human rights activists around the world. These included Hong Kong activist Joshua Wong, who joined Taiwan's New Power Party Executive Chairman Huang Kuo-chang, and former Sunflower Movement leaders to condemn Lee's continued detention.

Since Lee is a former worker for the Democratic Progressive Party and NGO employee, the incident led to friction between security institutions in Taiwan and mainland China.

On 29 March a representative of the mainland Chinese government stated that Lee was under investigation on suspicion of harming national security. Ma Xiaoguang, a spokesman for Beijing's Taiwan Affairs Office (TAO), has said in a press conference that Lee is "currently in good physical condition". Lee's wife, Lee Ching-yu, called on Beijing to immediately release him and to clarify the charges brought against him and ensure his rights were respected. In an effort to find her husband, Lee Ching-yu booked a flight from Taiwan to mainland China on 10 April 2017, but was banned from entering the country by its Ministry of Public Security.

On 13 April, an editorial in Taiwan News asserted that this type of situation should be covered by the "Cross-Strait Joint Crime-Fighting and Judicial Mutual Assistance Agreement".

== Trial and imprisonment ==
In September 2017, Lee Ming-che pleaded guilty to "subverting state power" in a court in Hunan, though his wife and supporters claimed his confession was forced. Following his conviction he was incarcerated in Chishan Prison. In November 2017, Lee was sentenced to five years imprisonment.

In 2020 the Rescue Lee Ming-che Team held an exhibition in Taipei which featured 365 letters written to Lee Ming-che, the Team also organized a two week long lecture series on Lee's case and the general human rights situation in mainland China. The letter writing campaign was a response to Lee being denied the right to write/receive letters and telephone calls, violating both the Prison Law of the People's Republic of China and the UN Standard Minimum Rules for the Treatment of Prisoners.

== Release ==
In April 2022, the Taiwan Affairs Office disclosed that Lee's health condition was stable, and that he would be released soon, completing a five-year term in detention. Lee was formally released on 14 April 2022, and returned to Taiwan the next day.
