= Wanzihu =

Wanzihu Township 万子湖乡
- Township
- Location in Hunan
- Coordinates: 28°49′51″N 112°23′23″E
- Country: People's Republic of China
- Province: Hunan
- Prefecture-level city: Yiyang
- County-level city: Yuanjiang

Area
  - Total: 209 km^{2} (81 sq mi)

Population
  - Total: 11,000
  - Density: 53/km^{2} (140/sq mi)
- Time zone: UTC+8 (China Standard)
- Area code: 0737

Wanzihu Township (simplified Chinese: 万子湖乡; traditional Chinese: 萬子湖鄉; pinyin: Wànzǐhú xiāng) is a rural township in Yuanjiang, Yiyang, Hunan Province, People's Republic of China.

== Administrative divisions ==
The township is divided into eight villages and one community, which include the following areas: Jiahe Community, Wanzihu Village, Xiaohezui Village, Baishahu Village, Guanzhushan Village, Minglangshan Village, Lianhua Village, Penghu Village, and Yuzhou Village (加禾社区、万子湖村、小河嘴村、白沙湖村、管竹山村、明朗山村、莲花村、澎湖村、渔舟村).
