= Gonghua =

Gonghua 共华镇
- Town
- Location in Hunan
- Coordinates: 28°55′33″N 112°27′25″E
- Country: People's Republic of China
- Province: Hunan
- Prefecture-level city: Yiyang
- County-level city: Yuanjiang

Area
  - Total: 150.6 km^{2} (58.1 sq mi)

Population
  - Total: 73,000
  - Density: 480/km^{2} (1,300/sq mi)
- Time zone: UTC+8 (China Standard)
- Area code: 0737

Gonghua Town (simplified Chinese: 共华镇; traditional Chinese: 共華鎮; pinyin: Gònghuá zhèn) is an urban town in Yuanjiang, Yiyang, Hunan Province, People's Republic of China.

== Administrative divisions ==
The town is divided into 20 villages and one community, which include the following areas: Huangtubao Community, Huangtubao Village, Tuanhuzhou Village, Donghe Village, Tanjialing Village, Dongcheng Village, Xingang Village, Huaxing Village, Haozhuhu Village, Mingyue Village, Baxingcha Village, Baishazhou Village, Ren'an Village, Renfeng Village, Xianchengyuan Village, Fu'an Village, Yong'an Village, Shuangfu Village, Heyu Village, Qunxing Village, Zihongzhou Village, Gonghuazhen Village, Baxingcha Village (黄土包社区、黄土包村、团湖洲村、东合村、谭家岭村、东成村、新港村、华兴村、蒿竹湖村、明月村、八形汊村、白沙洲村、仁安村、仁丰村、宪成垸村、福安村、永安村、双阜村、和裕村、群兴村、紫红洲村、共华镇渔场、八形汊渔场).
