= Yangluozhou =

Yangluozhou 阳罗洲镇
- Town
- Location in Hunan
- Coordinates: 29°03′04″N 112°34′33″E
- Country: People's Republic of China
- Province: Hunan
- Prefecture-level city: Yiyang
- County-level city: Yuanjiang

Area
  - Total: 97.8 km^{2} (37.8 sq mi)

Population
  - Total: 52,000
  - Density: 530/km^{2} (1,400/sq mi)
- Time zone: UTC+8 (China Standard)
- Area code: 0737

Yangluozhou Town (simplified Chinese: 阳罗洲镇; traditional Chinese: 陽羅洲鎮; pinyin: Yángluózhōu zhèn) is an urban town in Yuanjiang, Yiyang, Hunan Province, People's Republic of China.

== Administrative divisions ==
The town is divided into 18 villages and one community, which include the following areas: Yongxing Community, Yuejin Village, Shengli Village, Dongxin Village, Baosan Village, Houlong Village, Fuxing Village, Fu'an Village, Fumin Village, Dazhong Village, Youfeng Village, Qizijia Village, Yangluo Village, Fufeng Village, Xingle Village, Tubao Village, Liayi Village, Lvfeng Village, Waganghuyu Village (永兴社区、跃进村、胜利村、东新村、宝三村、候龙村、复兴村、富安村、富民村、大中村、友丰村、七子浃村、阳罗村、富丰村、兴乐村、土垉村、俩仪村、吕丰村、瓦岗湖渔村).
