= Sihushan =

Sihushan 泗湖山镇
- Town
- Location in Hunan
- Coordinates: 28°58′18″N 112°38′29″E
- Country: People's Republic of China
- Province: Hunan
- Prefecture-level city: Yiyang
- County-level city: Yuanjiang

Area
  - Total: 117.4 km^{2} (45.3 sq mi)

Population
  - Total: 62,000
  - Density: 530/km^{2} (1,400/sq mi)
- Time zone: UTC+8 (China Standard)
- Area code: 0737

Sihushan Town (simplified Chinese: 泗湖山镇; traditional Chinese: 泗湖山鎮; pinyin: Sìhúshān zhèn) is an urban town in Yuanjiang, Yiyang, Hunan Province, People's Republic of China.

== Administrative divisions ==
The town is divided into 18 villages and one community, which include the following areas: Qiubanzui Community, Sihushan Village, Zhufeng Village, Niuweituo Village, Qunyi Village, Pingtangling Village, Beigang Village, Nanzhunao Village, Dongtinghong Village, Zhonghua Village, Huaxing Village, Shizigeng Village, Heping Village, Dongfu Village, Liangxian Village, Shuangdong Village, Zhonghe Village, Jingxiazhou Village, and Shuanghua Village (锹板嘴社区、泗湖山村、朱冯村、牛尾托村、群益村、坪塘岭村、北港村、南竹脑村、洞庭红村、重华村、华星村、石子埂村、和平村、东福村、两鲜村、双东村、中和村、净下洲村、双华村).
