= Sanyantang =

Sanyantang 三眼塘镇
- town
- Location in Hunan
- Coordinates (Zhou Binyin former residence): 28°45′50″N 112°21′17″E
- Country: People's Republic of China
- Province: Hunan
- Prefecture-level city: Yiyang
- County-level city: Yuanjiang

Area
  - Total: 99 km^{2} (38 sq mi)

Population
  - Total: 48,000
  - Density: 480/km^{2} (1,300/sq mi)
- Time zone: UTC+8 (China Standard)
- Area code: 0737

Sanyantang Town (simplified Chinese: 三眼塘镇; traditional Chinese: 三眼塘鎮; pinyin: Sānyǎntáng zhèn) is an urban town in Yuanjiang, Yiyang, Hunan Province, People's Republic of China.

== Administrative divisions ==
The town is divided into 17 villages and one community, which include the following areas: Haishang Community, Shiliping Village, Huangmaoxin Village, Sanyantang Village, Huangjiahu Village, Dongxing Village, Yongjian Village, Hehua Village, Haojianghu Village, Yangmeishan Village, Lianzitang Village, Jionglongshan Village, Chitang Village, Xianfeng Village, Longjia Village, Jiaoshanzui Village, Nanzhushan Village, and Yanzhihu Village (海上社区、十里坪村、黄茅新村、三眼塘村、黄家湖村、洞兴村、永建村、荷花村、浩江湖村、杨梅山村、莲子塘村、廻龙山村、赤塘村、先锋村、龙浃村、焦山嘴村、南竹山村、胭脂湖村).
