= Yu Dongyue =

Chinese dissident

- 喻东岳
- Born: December 4, 1967 (age 58); Liuyang, Hunan, China
- Education: Xiangtan Normal College
- Occupations: Journalist, photographer
- Known for: 1989 Mao portrait vandalism incident

Chinese name
- Traditional Chinese: 喻東嶽
- Simplified Chinese: 喻东岳
Transcriptions
Standard Mandarin
- Hanyu Pinyin: Yù Dōngyuè
- Gwoyeu Romatzyh: Yuh Dongyueh
- Wade–Giles: Yü Tung-yüeh

Yu Dongyue (Chinese: 喻东岳; pinyin: Yù Dōngyuè, born December 4, 1967) is a Chinese former editor and political prisoner. Yu was born in Liuyang, Hunan. He is the former arts editor of Liuyang Daily. In the Tiananmen protests of 1989, following a plan made by his friend Yu Zhijian, he and Lu Decheng threw eggshells full of paint at a portrait of China's political figure Mao Zedong. Yu Dongyue was given a 20-year prison sentence for "sabotage" and "counter-revolutionary propaganda". He had become badly disturbed psychologically. He was also criticized for his "very avant-garde views on art". He also had been subjected to various physical tortures because of "reactionary statements" he and his friends made about officials.

== Early life ==
Yu Dongyue graduated at age seventeen from Xiangtan Normal College, the same college that Yu Zhijian attended. He got a prestigious first assignment as a fine-arts teacher at a vocational school in Xiangtan city that recruited students nationwide, then was transferred to the propaganda job in Liuyang. In the summer of 1987, an official known as Tanxu introduced Yu Zhijian to him. Yu Dongyue had been transferred to Liuyang to serve as an arts editor, his job consisted of taking photographs and draw illustrations to accompany stories in the paper. Yu Zhijian and Lu Decheng were close friends from a young age, later, the three young men became friends. Yu Dongyue was cerebral like Yu Zhijian, but he also shared Decheng's physical prowess. He was an excellent basketball player and preferred to have an early-morning swim, even on winter mornings when the ice had formed at the river's edge in Liuyang. In 1989, Yu Dongyue was a twenty-one-year-old arts editor at the Liuyang Daily.

== Trip to Beijing ==
The three friends have the similar interest of reading the literature. They had the ordinary life until Hu Yaobang died on April 15, their enthusiasm for literature rose instantly. They believed that all the corruption, the nepotism, and the stagnated political reform in 1980s Chinese society were deeply rooted in the Chinese governmental dictatorship. Hu Yaobang was also from Liuyang, Yu Dongyue and his friends discussed that they need to engage in memorial for Hu Yaobang as one of their notable countrymen. In the later days, they talk a lot about what happened in Beijing and national politics. Whether the Chinese people have democracy and the governmental conflicts. On May 16, after a whole night of discussion about national affairs, three young men and Li Hongwu, the best friend of Lu Decheng decided to go to Beijing.

In the preparation to travel to Beijing, Yu Dongyue put his notebook, a writing pad and pens, and a camera that belonged to his work unit into a yellow backpack. Before they departed on May 17, in the square of the train station, Yu Dongyue laid out his materials on a long counter. Using black ink on white poster boards, he wrote: "End one-party dictatorship and build up democratic China." On a 5-meter length of red silk, using yellow paint-paint manufactured for use on metal, to give his calligraphy a sheen. He wrote four characters that meant "Down with Deng, Support Fang," and then the group's name: "The Hunan Student Movement Support Group, Liuyang Branch. Yu Dongyue and his friends made speeches at the Changsha railway station and solicited donations for their trip.

== Role in Tiananmen Square protests ==
Yu Dongyue, Yu Zhijian, Lu Decheng and Li Hongwu were on board a train that arrived in Beijing on May 18. Later that night, the four recognized the determined voice of Wuer Kaixi. After the four had a discussion with Wuer Kaixi about Mao, Zhijian was brimming with enthusiasm to write a new speech due to he impressed with Wuer's ability to connect the historical and the present. He and Dongyue wrote a draft of a speech.

In the next day, the four tied red cloths around their foreheads to show they were in solidarity with the students. Yu Dongyue was the one who helped turn Yu Zhijian's ideas into speeches and into the proclamation delivered to the monument, but the radio station didn't report it. Yu Dongyue was disappointed about this situation and tried to find a resolution to against the authorities and the ignorance of students. Then Yu Zhijian proposed to tarnish the portrait of Mao in order to symbolically terminate the Communist tyranny, Yu Dongyue and Lu Decheng agreed.

After they decided to throw paint on the portrait of Mao, Yu Dongyue determined what supplies were needed. He and his two friends went to Beijing's shopping district on Wangfujing street to find the professional artist's supplies: acrylic paints, turpentine, a calligraphy brush, an ink stone, rice paste, and four sheets of sandalwood-bark paper. After they got supplies, Li Hongwu was persuading them to stop this plan but he failed. Before three friends operated their plan, they went to post office to send a letter to their family, as the last communication to them if the plan failed. Yu Dongyue wrote nine letters, the recipients included his employer, the Liuyang Daily, his family and former classmates.

On May 23, 1989, the target was the huge portrait of Mao Zedong. According to Yu Zhijian's thoughts, Yu Dongyue meticulously wrote the characters "Five thousand years of dictatorship will cease at this point! The cult of personality worship will vanish from this day onward" and hung on the two sides of the portrait. The eggs, begged off an itinerant pancake-seller, were filled with paint and ink. Yu Dongyue and Lu Decheng threw eggs that had been emptied and refilled with red, blue and yellow paint at the large portrait of Mao Zedong displayed prominently near Tiananmen Square, the stain adhered on the portrait, Splatters of paint landed on the face and shirt of the People's Republic of China's founding leader. The students in the square, believing that the three were agents provocateurs, seized them and handed them over to the police. Their activities were labelled as "counter-revolutionary sabotage".

== Imprisonment ==
On June 16, 1989, Yu Dongyue and his two friends were charged with counter-revolutionary propaganda and incitement, counter-revolutionary sabotage, writing reactionary slogans, and destruction of state property, the accusation of them was announced from Xinwen Lianbo to the nationwide audience. They were incarcerated in the next day, but apart from each other at Banbuqiao Prison, the largest prison of Beijing, it was also called "K-Block".

By the late fall in 1989, Beijing's jail was overflowing with detainees, so Beijing authorities repatriated the three to their home province to serve out their sentences. They were assigned to the same cell room at Hunan Provincial No. 2 Prison also called Yanbei Prison at Hengyang city. After they came to Yanbei prison, Yu Dongyue liked to start each day by standing several minutes under the icy shower. Because he had always believed bathing in cold water was a good way to strengthen the body. But he and Yu Zhijian had not committed counter-revolutionary crimes, therefore their family members were not permitted to visit them. In February 1990, prison authorities singled out Yu Zhijian and Yu Dongyue for harsh denunciation and stepped forward to upbraid the counter-revolutionary crime and thoughts.

The cell boss was called "corrected activist", they were also beaten-up new detainees in the office. Yu Dongyue has also sustained a lot torment, then, Yu Zhijian and Yu Dongyue proposed to the new detainees that they need to band together and counter with the prison authorities. In order to resist the Rigid Control Centre in the prison, Yu Dongyue and other prisoners organized a hunger strike, he also composed poems to commemorate the strikes. When the hunger strike went into the fifth day, the officials made apologies.

On the last day of March 1990, Yu Zhijian and Yu Dongyue were transferred. Yu Dongyue went to Hunan Provincial No.1 Prison, also known as Chishan Prison, the Yuanjiang Electrical Machinery factory and the Dongtinghua farm. During his incarceration in Hunan province's No. 1 Prison, he spent two years in solitary confinement, he was given electric shocks, beaten and tortured in other ways and he got a big scar on the right side of his head. In 1992, he wrote on a prison blackboard the words "Re-evaluate June 4" and "Down with Deng Xiaoping," the Chinese leader at the time, which led to further brutal beatings, according to a human-rights group. Yu Dongyue was later transferred to Chishan Prison in Yuanjiang city, Hunan, formerly known as Provincial No. 1 Prison and another of the "Labor Camps." After their release, Lu Decheng and Yu Zhijian reported that Yu Dongyue appeared injured and mentally disturbed. They repeatedly petitioned for his release on medical grounds. Reportedly, Yu Dongyue was uncooperative in the views of prison officials. There have been several reports that he was tortured and held for at least two years in solitary confinement.

In 2001 Yu Dongyue's sentence was reduced by two years, and in 2005 it was reduced by another 15 months. Scheduled for release on February 26, 2006, he was freed four days earlier. According to statements around the time of his release from his younger brother, Yu Xiyue, while in prison Yu Dongyue appeared deranged and no longer recognized members of his family or his former friends.

Yu Dongyue was not forgotten while in prison. In 2005 the Wei Jingsheng Foundation (established by Democracy Wall activist Wei Jingsheng) awarded Yu Dongyue one of its three prizes of the year for promotion of democracy in China.

== Life after prison ==
Yu Dongyue was finally freed from prison on February 22, 2006, aged 38, after serving 16 years. Yu Dongyue was also driven insane by 16 years of confinement. He was reported to be incoherent and unable to communicate, repeating words as if he was chanting a mantra.

In order to provide a place for Yu Dongyue to get medical treatment and recovery, in 2009, Yu Zhijian and his family with Yu Dongyue and his sister fled together out of the country. The United States granted them political asylum, and they were settled in a town in Indiana. Yu Zhijian and his wife took responsibility for looking after Yu Dongyue.
