= Sijihong =

Sijihong 四季红镇
- town
- Location in Hunan
- Coordinates: 29°06′58″N 112°34′04″E
- Country: People's Republic of China
- Province: Hunan
- Prefecture-level city: Yiyang
- County-level city: Yuanjiang

Area
  - Total: 14.7 km^{2} (5.7 sq mi)

Population
  - Total: 17,000
  - Density: 1,200/km^{2} (3,000/sq mi)
- Time zone: UTC+8 (China Standard)
- Area code: 0737

Sijihong Town (simplified Chinese: 四季红镇; traditional Chinese: 四季紅鎮; pinyin: Sìjìhóng zhèn) is an urban town in Yuanjiang, Yiyang, Hunan Province, People's Republic of China.

== Administrative divisions ==
The town is divided into nine villages and one community, which include the following areas: Sijihong Community, Wuxing Village, Sijihong Village, Yuque Village, Changzheng Village, Xianfeng Village, Yangquehong Village, Dongfeng Village, Hongqi Village, and Anxin Village (四季红社区、五星村、四季红村、玉鹊村、长征村、先锋村、阳雀洪村、东风村、红旗村、安心村).
