= Ge Xiaoguang =

Chinese artist (born 1953)

Ge Xiaoguang (Chinese: 葛小光; born 1953 in Beijing) is a Chinese artist best known for painting the massive 6 x 4.6-meter portrait of Mao Zedong that hangs at Tiananmen Gate in Tiananmen Square.

== Education and training ==
Ge Xiaoguang graduated from the Fine Arts Department of Capital Normal University, and in 1971, was employed by Beijing Fine Arts Company (renamed Beijing Gehua Cultural Development Group in 1997) where he began to study large-scale portrait painting from Wang Guodong. In 1971, Ge also became responsible for painting gigantic portraits of Sun Yat-sen, Karl Marx, Vladimir Lenin and Joseph Stalin for display in the Tiananmen Square.

== Mao Portrait ==
In 1976, the year of Mao Zedong's death, Wang Guodong retired and Ge Xiaoguang took his place in 1977 as the author of Mao's portrait at Tiananmen Gate, which must be re-painted and re-hung yearly due to the effects of weather and air pollution. It is a job that Ge Xiaoguang continues to this day in a studio located near Tiananmen Square. He is also an artist of landscape paintings.

== See also ==
- 1989 Mao portrait vandalism incident
