= Huangmaozhou =

Huangmaozhou 黄茅洲镇
- Town
- Location in Hunan
- Coordinates: 28°57′36″N 112°29′22″E
- Country: People's Republic of China
- Province: Hunan
- Prefecture-level city: Yiyang
- County-level city: Yuanjiang

Area
  - Total: 126.87 km^{2} (48.98 sq mi)

Population
  - Total: 76,000
  - Density: 600/km^{2} (1,600/sq mi)
- Time zone: UTC+8 (China Standard)
- Area code: 0737

Huangmaozhou Town (simplified Chinese: 黄茅洲镇; traditional Chinese: 黃茅洲鎮; pinyin: Huángmáozhōu zhèn) is an urban town in Yuanjiang, Yiyang, Hunan Province of the People's Republic of China.
