= Xinwan, Yuanjiang =

Xinwan 新湾镇
- Town
- Location in Hunan
- Coordinates: 28°55′46″N 112°18′58″E
- Country: People's Republic of China
- Province: Hunan
- Prefecture-level city: Yiyang
- County-level city: Yuanjiang

Area
  - Total: 56.5 km^{2} (21.8 sq mi)

Population
  - Total: 23,000
  - Density: 410/km^{2} (1,100/sq mi)
- Time zone: UTC+8 (China Standard)
- Area code: 0737

Xinwan Town (simplified Chinese: 新湾镇; traditional Chinese: 新灣鎮; pinyin: Xīnwān zhèn) is an urban town in Yuanjiang, Yiyang, Hunan Province, People's Republic of China.

== Administrative divisions ==
The town is divided into eight villages and one community, which include the following areas: Zhenxing Community, Mingyue Village, Banshanzhou Village, Xinwan Village, Lianhua Village, Laowuchong Village, Qiaobei Village, Yanggelao Village, and Zhougonghu Village (振兴社区、明月村、畔山洲村、新湾村、莲花村、老屋冲村、桥北村、杨阁老村、周公湖村).
