= Qionghu =

Qionghu Subdistrict 琼湖街道
- Subdistrict
- Location in Hunan
- Coordinates: 28°51′30″N 112°21′55″E
- Country: People's Republic of China
- Province: Hunan
- Prefecture-level city: Yiyang
- County-level city: Yuanjiang

Area
  - Total: 5.5 km^{2} (2.1 sq mi)

Population
  - Total: 68,500
  - Density: 12,000/km^{2} (32,000/sq mi)
- Time zone: UTC+8 (China Standard)
- Area code: 0737

Qionghu Subdistrict (simplified Chinese: 琼湖街道; traditional Chinese: 瓊湖街道; pinyin: Qiónghú jiēdào) is a Subdistrict in Yuanjiang, Yiyang, Hunan Province, People's Republic of China.

== Administrative divisions ==
The subdistrict is divided into four villages and 12 communities, which include the following areas: Hanjiacha Community, Wangjiating Community, Shangangkou Community, Xinxing Community, Xinhe Community, Baile Community, Yangsiqiao Community, Jintian Community, Xinjian Community, Taibai Community, Shuangfeng Community, Wudao Community, Sainanhu Village, Zhananhu Village, Baomin Village, and Jiuzhishu Village (韩家汊社区、王家亭社区、山巷口社区、新兴社区、新和社区、百乐社区、杨泗桥社区、金田社区、新建社区、太白社区、双凤社区、五岛社区、塞南湖村、榨南湖村、保民村、九只树村).
