= Denise Chong =

Canadian economist and writer

- Born: 9 June 1953 (age 73); Vancouver, British Columbia, Canada
- Education: University of British Columbia; University of Toronto
- Occupations: Economist, writer
- Spouse: Roger Smith
- Children: 2

Denise Chong, OC (Chinese: 鄭霭玲; born 9 June 1953) is a Canadian economist and writer.

== Early life and schooling ==
A third-generation Chinese Canadian, Chong was born in Vancouver, British Columbia on 9 June 1953, and was raised in Prince George. She studied economics at the University of British Columbia (UBC) earning her bachelor's degree in 1975. She received an MA from the University of Toronto in 1978.

== Career as an economist ==
Chong's career as an economist began when she moved to Ottawa to work in the Department of Finance, where she was employed until 1980. She then worked for one year as a special advisor in the Prime Minister's Office, dealing with issues pertaining to British Columbia. In 1981, she became a senior economic advisor and worked closely with the late Pierre Elliott Trudeau until the end of his term in 1984. It has been noted that her presence, as a Chinese female, was remarkable in the white male dominated world of government finance and that "she was a trailblazer for the more inclusive public service that was to come." Denise Chong's career in the Canadian government is made even more significant with her realization, through her familial and historical research, that her "grandparents lived in Canada at a time when they could not participate in White society. They were excluded from it: they could not take out citizenship, they couldn't own land, they couldn't vote."

With the end of Trudeau's term in 1984, Denise Chong left her role as a public servant in order to pursue a career as a professional writer.

== Writing career ==
Though her professional writing career did not begin until much later, Denise Chong was a journalist for the Ubyssey, a student newspaper at UBC, while she was an undergraduate student there.

Denise Chong has published four literary non-fiction books and edited one compilation of short stories. Because of the importance of the Canadian historical research in Chong's first book, a memoir of her family, The Concubine's Children, she has become "renowned as a writer and commentator on Canadian history and on the family." This book, one of the first non-fiction narrative accounts of the Chinese in Canada, was a Globe and Mail best seller for ninety-three weeks. A speech that she gave for Citizenship Week in 1995 entitled "Being Canadian" has been widely anthologized, including in the books Who Speaks for Canada: Words that Shape a Country by D. Morton and M. Weinfeld (1998), and Great Canadian Speeches by D. Gruending (2004).

Chong's emphasis on the voices of women, as well as her particular brand of nationalism (which is more than a little critical), are both reflected in her edited compilation The Penguin Anthology of Stories by Canadian Women. That many of the authors published in this anthology are also women of transnational identities is a reflection of Denise Chong's concern for the multicultural quality of being Canadian. In Chong's own words, "Canadian citizenship recognizes differences. It praises diversity. It is what we as Canadians choose to have in common with each other […] How we tell our stories is the work of citizenship". In her introduction to the anthology, Chong highlights what attracted her to the stories, seeming to also articulate one of the strong characteristics of her own writing: "The plot that interested me was life lived in the chaos and uncertainty of everyday happenings and relationships." All of Chong's books evoke such "everyday happenings and relationships" amidst the extraordinary circumstances of war, communism, immigration, and racism.

Denise Chong's second book, The Girl in the Picture, about iconic Vietnamese napalm victim Kim Phuc, portrayed everyday life in war-torn Vietnam. Her book Egg on Mao: The Story of an Ordinary Man Who Defaced an Icon and Unmasked a Dictatorship, released on 29 September 2009 by Random House Canada, was Chong's first book in a decade. Egg on Mao tells the story of Lu Decheng, a bus mechanic, who, with two friends, challenged his family's communist allegiance by defacing a portrait of chairman Mao Zedong during the 1989 protests in Tiananmen Square. In an interview about this story exploring human rights in China, Chong said, "It was a very Chinese act. In the West, we would view something like this as a quixotic and think how naive these men were. But in China, it's your only gesture. Of course they were naive. But you have to balance the futility of the gesture against the weight of repression… people are willing to make a futile gesture for the nobility of having acted."

Her 2013 non-fiction book, Lives of the Family: Stories of Fate and Circumstance, relates stories about the experiences of Chinese-Canadian families who settled in Canada's National Capital Region. This work earned her praise in Toronto Star and Vancouver Sun book reviews.

== Publications ==
Denise Chong talks about Egg on Mao on Bookbits radio.

- The Concubine's Children was published in 1994 by Penguin Books in Toronto.
- "Being Canadian" is a speech given by Denise Chong during the 1995 Citizenship Week. This speech has been widely anthologized, including in the books Who Speaks for Canada: Words that Shape a Country by Desmond Morton and Morton Weinfeld (1998), and Great Canadian Speeches by D. Gruending.
- The Penguin Anthology of Stories by Canadian Women was published in 1997 by Penguin Books in Toronto.
- The Girl in the Picture: The Kim Phuc Story was published in 1999 by Viking Press in Toronto.
- Egg on Mao: The Story of an Ordinary Man Who Defaced an Icon and Unmasked a Dictatorship was published in 2009 by Random House Canada.
- Lives of the Family: Stories of Fate and Circumstance was published in 2013 by Random House Canada.

== Other public service and personal life ==
In addition to continuing her career as a writer, Chong serves on the boards, task forces, and committees of several organizations including the Task Force on the Participation of Visible Minorities in the Federal Public Service, the National Advisory Board on Culture Online, and the McGill Institute for the Study of Canada. In 2013, she was appointed to the Order of Canada, the country's highest civilian award.

Denise Chong lives in Ottawa, Ontario, with her husband, CTV reporter Roger Smith, and her two children, Jade and Kai. She received honorary doctorates from York University in October 2007, Bishop's University, and the University of Northern British Columbia.
