= Qingyunshan =

Qingyunshan Subdistrict 庆云山街道
- Subdistrict
- Location in Hunan
- Coordinates: 28°50′04″N 112°23′23″E
- Country: People's Republic of China
- Province: Hunan
- County-level city: Yiyang
- County-level city: Yuanjiang

Area
  - Total: 36.8 km^{2} (14.2 sq mi)

Population
  - Total: 61,000
  - Density: 1,700/km^{2} (4,300/sq mi)
- Time zone: UTC+8 (China Standard)
- Area code: 0737

Qingyunshan Subdistrict (simplified Chinese: 庆云山街道; traditional Chinese: 慶雲山街道; pinyin: Qìngyúnshān jiēdào) is a Subdistrict in Yuanjiang, Yiyang, Hunan Province, People's Republic of China.

== Administrative divisions ==
The subdistrict is divided into one village and six communities, which include the following areas: Heping Community, Yihe Community, Qingyunshan Community, Shuyuan Community, Daqiao Community, Xiangbei Community, and Bainihu Village (和平社区、义和社区、庆云山社区、书院社区、大桥社区、湘北社区、白泥湖村).
