= Caowei =

Caowei 草尾镇
- Town
- Location in Hunan
- Coordinates: 29°02′21″N 112°22′29″E
- Country: People's Republic of China
- Province: Hunan
- Prefecture-level city: Yiyang
- County-level city: Yuanjiang

Area
  - Total: 143.5 km^{2} (55.4 sq mi)

Population
  - Total: 100,000
  - Density: 700/km^{2} (1,800/sq mi)
- Time zone: UTC+8 (China Standard)
- Area code: 0737

Caowei Town (simplified Chinese: 草尾镇; traditional Chinese: 草尾鎮; pinyin: Cǎowěi Zhèn) is an urban town in Yuanjiang, Yiyang, Hunan Province, People's Republic of China.

== Administrative divisions ==
The town is divided into 26 villages and one community, which include the following areas: Caowei Community, Lixin Village, Shengtian Village, Shangmatou Village, Leyuan Village, Xingfu Village, Heping Village, Lehua Village, Xinmin Village, Minzhu Village, Sanmatou Village, Xinle Village, Simin Village, Bao'anyuan Village, Xin'an Village, Donghong Village, Shuangdong Village, Dongfeng Village, Sanxing Village, Guangming Village, Renhe Village, Renyi Village, Datongzha Village, Dafu Village, Changle Village, Caoweiyu Village, and Shengliyu Village, (草尾社区、立新村、胜天村、上码头村、乐园村、幸福村、和平村、乐华村、新民村、民主村、三码头村、新乐村、四民村、保安垸村、新安村、东红村、双东村、东风村、三星村、光明村、人和村、人益村、大同闸村、大福村、常乐村、草尾渔村、胜利渔村).
