= Wang Guodong (painter) =

Chinese painter (1931–2019)

Wang Guodong (Chinese: 王国栋; 25 June 1931 – 23 August 2019) was a Chinese painter, known for his giant portraits of Mao Zedong hung on the Tiananmen in Beijing, which are among the world's most recognizable images.

== Early life ==
Wang Guodong was born on 25 June 1931 in Beiping (now Beijing), Republic of China. His family owned the historic casserole restaurant Sha Guo Ju (砂锅居). When the restaurant was nationalized after the founding of the People's Republic of China in 1949, he donated 17 properties under his name to the new government.

== Career ==
In 1964, Wang was chosen to replace Zhang Zhenshi as the lead painter of the giant portrait of Mao Zedong hung on the Tiananmen (Gate of Heavenly Peace) in Beijing. The portrait, measuring 20 by 15 feet (6.1 m × 4.6 m), is about three stories high and weighs about a metric ton. Although a portrait of Mao had hung on the Tiananmen since 1949, Wang was the first artist to paint the portrait by himself; all the previous versions were completed by a team of painters. His first portrait was displayed on the Tiananmen on 1 May 1964.

Although the job was considered one of the highest honours for a painter in China, Wang lived in obscurity as he was not allowed to put his name on the painting. Because the portrait is exposed to the elements, Wang painted an identical replacement every year. In late September, just before the National Day of China, the old portrait would be taken down in the night and replaced with the new one. Besides Mao, he also painted portraits of Karl Marx, Friedrich Engels, Vladimir Lenin, and Joseph Stalin.

During the Cultural Revolution, Wang was persecuted because of his "capitalist" family background and for painting Mao from an angle with only one visible ear. He was accused of implying that Mao only listened to a few people and not the general public. Although Wang argued that the painting was based on a photo issued by the government from which he was not allowed to deviate, he was still publicly humiliated in a struggle session and was sent to work as a carpenter at a framing factory for two years. Throughout the period, he continued to paint the official Mao portrait, now with two ears.

== Retirement and death ==
Wang retired in 1976 after training ten apprentices. Two of them, Liu Yang and Ge Xiaoguang, were chosen to paint Mao's portraits on Tiananmen, which have remained identical to Wang's design. As the demand for Mao portraits declined in the 1980s, Liu left the job and Ge has been the only painter of the Tiananmen portraits.

On 23 August 2019, Wang died at Beijing No. 6 Hospital, aged 88. He was survived by two sons. He was buried at the Babaoshan Revolutionary Cemetery, an honour normally reserved for the Communist Party elite.

== Influence ==
Wang's portraits of Mao are among the world's most recognizable images, comparable to the Mona Lisa. They have inspired Andy Warhol's famous portraits of Mao, which follow Wang's original one-eared design, as well as works by the Chinese artist Wang Guangyi.
