= Nandashan =

Nandashan 南大膳镇
- town
- Location in Hunan
- Coordinates: 29°00′44″N 112°42′49″E
- Country: People's Republic of China
- Province: Hunan
- Prefecture-level city: Yiyang
- County-level city: Yuanjiang

Area
  - Total: 169.7 km^{2} (65.5 sq mi)

Population
  - Total: 100,000
  - Density: 590/km^{2} (1,500/sq mi)
- Time zone: UTC+8 (China Standard)
- Area code: 0737

Nandashan Town (simplified Chinese: 南大膳镇; traditional Chinese: 南大膳鎮; pinyin: Nándàshàn zhèn) is an urban town in Yuanjiang, Yiyang, Hunan Province, People's Republic of China.

== Administrative divisions ==
The town is divided into 30 villages and one community, which include the following areas: Nanda Community, Nanfengyuan Village, Zhenjiao Village, Xiaoluosihu Village, Zhongxing Village, Niuzhou Village, Xifuyuan Village, Yinan Village, Nandahe Village, Sanxin Village, Kangningyuan Village, Huying Village, Xiaobo Village, Helihong Village, Dudi Village, Yongdong Village, Huafengyuan Village, Lingguanzui Village, Huasheng Village, Shuangfeng Village, Beiling Village, Nanyukou Village, Nanjingyuan Village, Dongjia Village, Doudoukou Village, Yongsheng Village, Beidashi Village, Dadongkou Village, Gaofengyu Village, Beidayu Village, and Donghuyu Village (南大社区、南丰垸村、镇郊村、晓螺丝湖村、众兴村、牛洲村、西福垸村、义南村、南大河村、三新村、康宁垸村、互英村、小波村、合利红村、堵堤村、永东村、华丰垸村、灵官咀村、华胜村、双丰村、北岭村、南渔口村、南京垸村、东浃村、石剅口村、永胜村、北大市村、大东口村、高丰渔村、北大渔村、东湖渔村).
