= Chapanzhou =

Chapanzhou 茶盘洲镇
- Town
- Location in Hunan
- Coordinates: 28°57′14″N 112°45′41″E
- Country: People's Republic of China
- Province: Hunan
- Prefecture-level city: Yiyang
- County-level city: Yuanjiang

Area
  - Total: 69.3 km^{2} (26.8 sq mi)

Population
  - Total: 23,000
  - Density: 330/km^{2} (860/sq mi)
- Time zone: UTC+8 (China Standard)
- Area code: 0737

Chapanzhou Town (simplified Chinese: 茶盘洲镇; traditional Chinese: 茶盤洲鎮; pinyin: Chápánzhōu zhèn) is an urban town in Yuanjiang, Yiyang, Hunan Province, People's Republic of China.

== Administrative divisions ==
The town is divided into 22 villages and two communities, which include the following areas: Xingfugang Community, Nanzhoujie Community, Chuangxin Village, Xinhua Village, Chaizhoubao Village, Hongqi Village, Hexing Village, Yuzhu Village, Ezhou Village, Suhutou Village, Nangang Village, Donghu Village, Yuping Village, Huaguoshan Village, Hongwu Village, Yongfeng Village, Xinhu Village, Shuanghua Village, Nanzhou Village, Xingfu Village, Beizha Village, Dongdi Village, Zhenjiao Village, and Tianxinyu Village (幸福港社区、南洲街社区、创新村、新华村、柴洲包村、红旗村、合兴村、玉竹村、鹅洲村、苏湖头村、南港村、东湖村、渔坪村、花果山村、宏武村、永丰村、新湖村、双华村、南洲村、幸福村、北闸村、东堤村、镇郊村、天心渔村).
