= Zhou Lingzhao =

Chinese painter (1919–2023)

- Born: 2 May 1919; Pingjiang County, China
- Died: 3 January 2023 (aged 103); Beijing, People's Republic of China
- Occupation: Painter

Zhou Lingzhao (Chinese: 周令钊; 2 May 1919 – 3 January 2023) was a Chinese painter.

On 1 October 1949, Zhou Lingzhao was ordered to paint the portrait of Mao Zedong at Tiananmen Square for the proclamation of the People's Republic of China. In the early days of the founding of the People's Republic of China, he successively contributed to the design of the flag of the Communist Youth League of China (1950), the flag of the Young Pioneers of China (designed by Liu Yiyan in 1950 and modified by Zhou Lingzhao), and contributed to the National Emblem of the People's Republic of China (1950).

Since 1950, Zhou Lingzhao had served annually as the art designer for the Chinese art team in the parade by Tiananmen Square of the International Workers' Day (1 May) and the National Day of the People's Republic of China (1 October). He contributed to the design of the 1 August Medal (1955), Order of Independence and Freedom and the Order of Liberation. Since 1950, he had been in charge of the art design of the second, third and fourth sets of Renminbi banknotes.

Zhou died in Beijing on 3 January 2023, at the age of 103.

== Notable works gallery ==

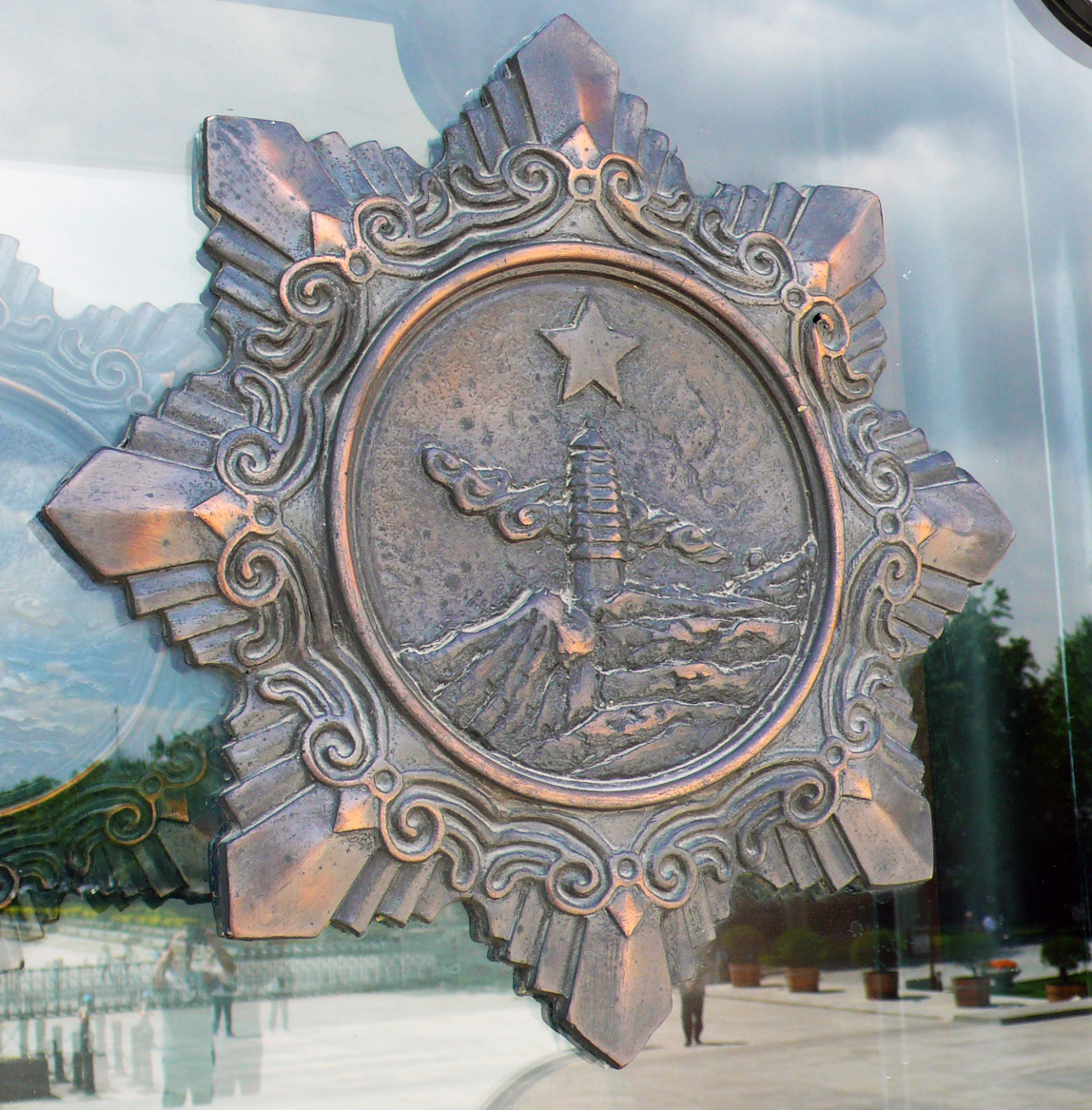
