= Dual-track economy =

Economy with planned and private sectors

A dual-track system is an economic system in which the government controls key sectors of the economy, while allowing private enterprise limited control over the other sectors.

In China, the government followed dual-track pricing until abolished in November 1989, known as "shuangguizhi" in Chinese. State-controlled (planned) prices, which were lower, accompanied the market prices, which were higher. This was done to ensure stability and gradual opening of markets (instead of a "big bang" strategy of sudden transformation to capitalism that was attempted in Eastern Europe and Russia). However, to provide incentive to the State-owned Enterprises, government allowed selling of the products at market prices after the planned targets had been met.

== See also ==
- Reform and opening up
- Socialist market economy
- Market socialism
- Socialism with Chinese characteristics
- Xi Jinping Thought
