= Yuanjiang =

Yuanjiang 沅江市 Yuankiang
- County-level city
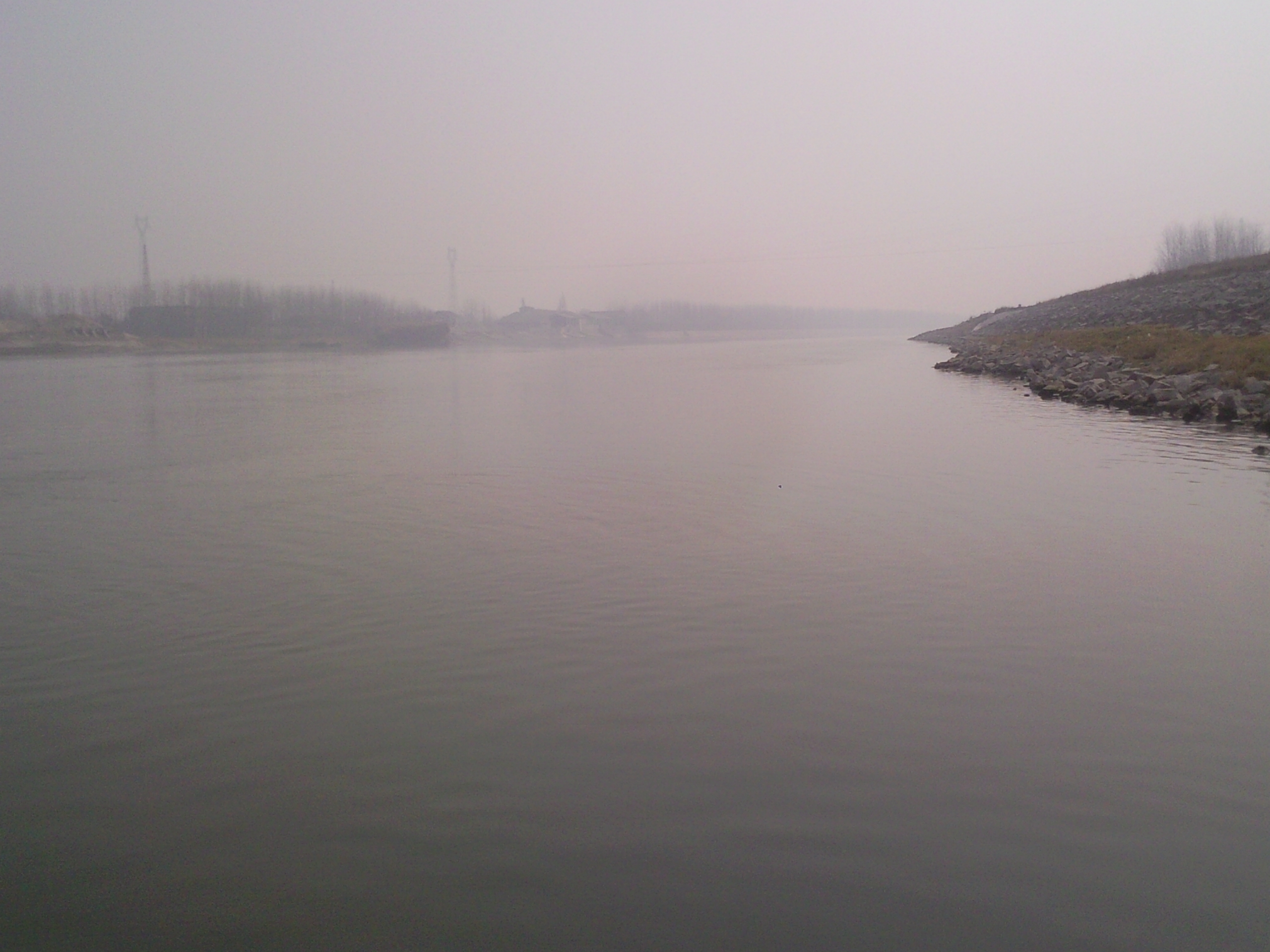

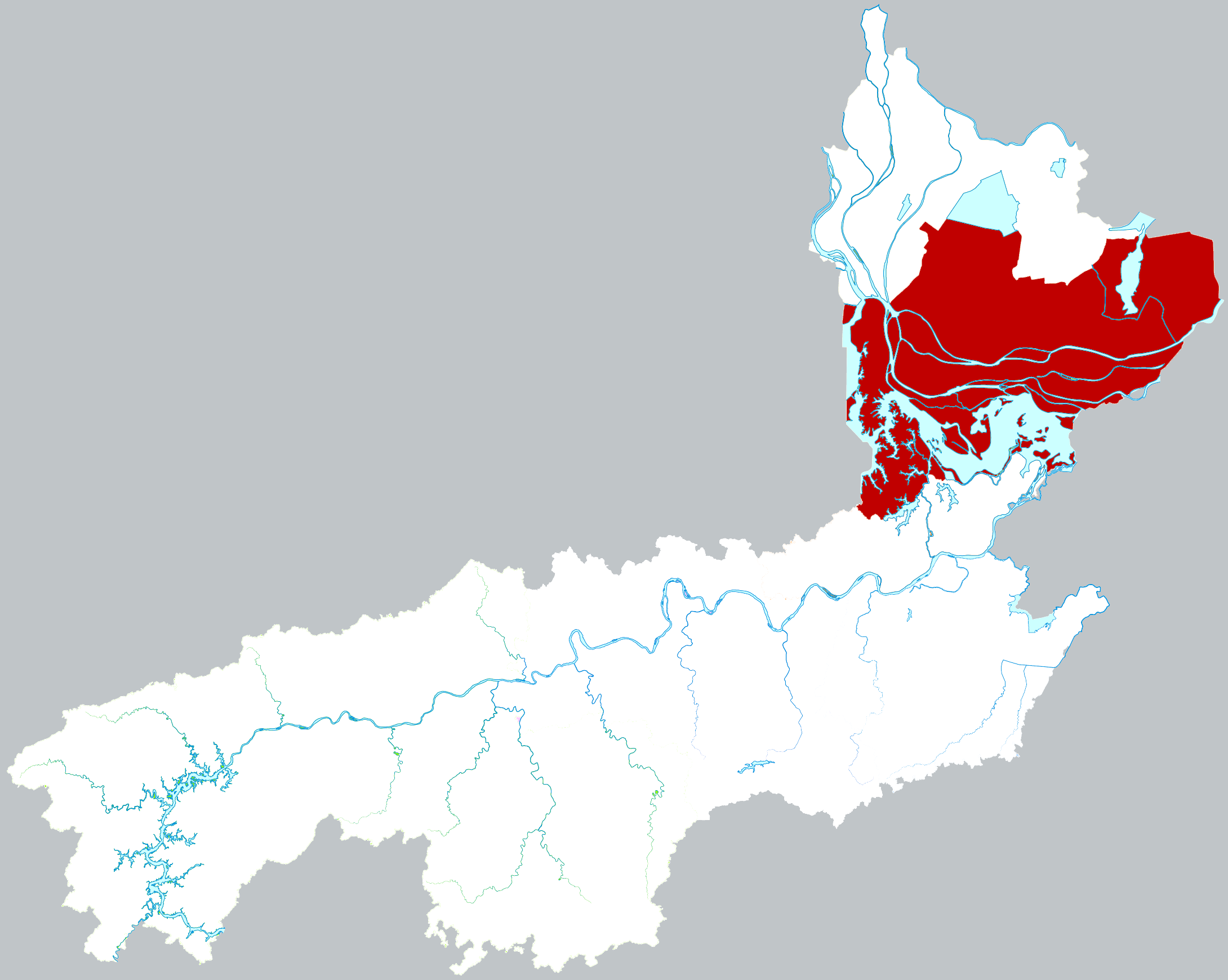
- Location of Yuanjiang City within Yiyang

- Location in Hunan Yuanjiang (China)
- Coordinates: 28°56′42″N 112°35′53″E
- Country: People's Republic of China
- Province: Hunan
- Prefecture-level city: Yiyang

Area
  - County-level city: 1,797.0 km^{2} (693.8 sq mi)
  - Urban: 19.68 km^{2} (7.60 sq mi)

Population (2017)
  - County-level city: 819,000
  - Density: 456/km^{2} (1,180/sq mi)
  - Urban: 191,000
- Time zone: UTC+8 (China Standard)
- Postal code: 422400

Yuanjiang (Chinese: 沅江市; pinyin: Yuánjiāng Shì) is a county-level city in the Province of Hunan, China. It is under the administration of the prefecture-level city of Yiyang.

Located in the north of the province, the city is bordered to the north by Nan County, to the northeast by Yueyang County, to the southeast by Xiangyin County, to the south by Ziyang District, and to the west by Hanshou County. Yuanjiang City covers 2,012.5 km^{2} (777.0 sq mi), and as of 2015, it had a registered population of 768,000 and a permanent resident population of 689,100. Yuanjiang has 11 towns and two subdistricts under its jurisdiction. The government seat is Qionghu (琼湖街道).

Yuanjiang is a city in the drainage basin of Yuan River (Yuan Jiang), it is named after the river, which flows through the city roughly west to east. The majority of the city's land is located on the northwestern bank of the Dongting Lake.

It is home to Chishan Prison, which holds a number of political prisoners.

== Administrative divisions ==
After an adjustment of township-level divisions of Yuanjiang City on 26 November 2015, Yuanjiang City has 11 towns and two subdistricts under its jurisdiction. They are:

2 subdistricts

- Qionghu (琼湖街道), merging Wanzihu Township, Qingyunshan Subdistrict and a portion of the former Qionghu Subdistrict on November 26, 2015.
- Yanzhihu (胭脂湖街道), merging Sanyantang Town and a portion of the former Qionghu Subdistrict on November 26, 2015.

11 towns

- Caowei (草尾镇)
- Chapanzhou (茶盘洲镇)
- Gonghua (共华镇)
- Huangmaozhou (黄茅洲镇)
- Nandashan (南大膳镇)
- Nanzui (南嘴镇)
- Qianshanhong (千山红镇)
- Sihushan (泗湖山镇)
- Sijihong (四季红镇)
- Xinwan, Yuanjiang (新湾镇)
- Yangluozhou (阳罗洲镇)

== Climate ==
Climate data for Yuanjiang, elevation 37 m (121 ft), (1991–2020 normals, extremes 1981–present)
Month	Jan	Feb	Mar	Apr	May	Jun	Jul	Aug	Sep	Oct	Nov	Dec	Year
Record high °C (°F)	23.6 (74.5)	29.1 (84.4)	33.1 (91.6)	34.5 (94.1)	35.9 (96.6)	37.6 (99.7)	39.3 (102.7)	40.5 (104.9)	37.4 (99.3)	34.4 (93.9)	30.1 (86.2)	23.3 (73.9)	40.5 (104.9)
Mean daily maximum °C (°F)	8.4 (47.1)	11.3 (52.3)	15.7 (60.3)	22.0 (71.6)	26.5 (79.7)	29.7 (85.5)	33.0 (91.4)	32.2 (90.0)	28.0 (82.4)	22.8 (73.0)	17.0 (62.6)	11.1 (52.0)	21.5 (70.7)
Daily mean °C (°F)	5.3 (41.5)	7.8 (46.0)	11.9 (53.4)	17.8 (64.0)	22.5 (72.5)	26.0 (78.8)	29.1 (84.4)	28.5 (83.3)	24.2 (75.6)	18.9 (66.0)	13.3 (55.9)	7.7 (45.9)	17.8 (63.9)
Mean daily minimum °C (°F)	3.0 (37.4)	5.3 (41.5)	9.2 (48.6)	14.8 (58.6)	19.5 (67.1)	23.3 (73.9)	26.2 (79.2)	25.7 (78.3)	21.5 (70.7)	16.2 (61.2)	10.6 (51.1)	5.2 (41.4)	15.0 (59.1)
Record low °C (°F)	−7.6 (18.3)	−5.1 (22.8)	−1.2 (29.8)	2.7 (36.9)	10.7 (51.3)	15.3 (59.5)	19.8 (67.6)	17.1 (62.8)	11.3 (52.3)	5.5 (41.9)	−0.5 (31.1)	−6.3 (20.7)	−7.6 (18.3)
Average precipitation mm (inches)	70.2 (2.76)	79.3 (3.12)	130.1 (5.12)	163.4 (6.43)	196.1 (7.72)	185.8 (7.31)	169.3 (6.67)	110.2 (4.34)	78.8 (3.10)	84.2 (3.31)	78.1 (3.07)	43.3 (1.70)	1,388.8 (54.65)
Average precipitation days (≥ 0.1 mm)	12.3	12.9	15.7	14.8	14.7	14.3	10.9	9.7	8.7	10.5	10.1	9.8	144.4
Average snowy days	5.3	2.9	0.9	0	0	0	0	0	0	0	0.1	1.7	10.9
Average relative humidity (%)	77	77	78	77	77	81	76	77	77	76	76	73	77
Mean monthly sunshine hours	67.4	70.7	89.8	115.2	137.6	137.4	208.6	200.9	144.6	120.3	107.3	97.6	1,497.4
Percentage possible sunshine	21	22	24	30	33	33	49	50	39	34	34	31	33
Source: China Meteorological Administration all-time extreme temperature
