= The Concubine's Children =

1995 non-fiction book by Denise Chong

The Concubine's Children: Portrait of a Family Divided
- First edition cover of Canadian release
- Author: Denise Chong
- Subject: Family history
- Genre: Non-fiction, book
- Publisher: Penguin Books
- Publication date: January 1, 1995
- Publication place: Canada
- Media type: Print (Hardcover & Paperback)
- Pages: 304 pp.
- ISBN: 9780140254273

The Concubine's Children: Portrait of a Family Divided is a non-fiction book written by Chinese-Canadian writer Denise Chong, first published in January 1995 by Penguin Books. In the book, the author traces her family's history, giving a narrative account of members from both sides of the ocean. The Concubine's Children is Chong's first book, which she compiled from letters, photographs and memory. The award-winning book has been called an "astonishing tale" written in "clear and unflinching prose".

== Synopsis ==
The Concubine's Children documents the life of Denise Chong's grandfather, Chan Sam; grandmother, May-ying; her mother, Hing (or Winnie, as she was known outside of Chinatown); her mother's siblings, Ping, Nan, and Gok-leng; and half sibling, Yuen. Chan Sam had two wives, May-ying in Canada and Huangbo in China, dividing the family between Canada and China. Chong's mother, Hing, only knew one of her siblings while growing up, Gok-leng. The Concubine's Children documents the story of this family which spanned two continents, as well as the political, social, and cultural tensions in China and Canada, between 1848, when Chan Sam's father, Chong's great-grandfather, first came to "Gold Mountain", the nickname by which Chinese people knew North America, and 1987 when Chong and Hing first met the "China family".

Chong was inspired to work on this family history–historical non-fiction novel after moving to Beijing in 1985, with her companion, and later husband, CTV correspondent Roger Smith.

While living in Peking, Denise Chong convinced her mother Hing/Winnie to join her on a three-week trip of China, which would take them to the village of Chang Gar Bin. Chang Gar Bin was Chan Sam's (Hing/Winnie's father and Denise Chong's grandfather)'s hometown, and the place where Hing's sisters, Ping and Nan, and half-brother Yueng, all of whom she had never met, had been raised. Before going to Chang Gar Bin, Denise contacted the Chinese foreign ministry in Canton, and discovered that two of her mother's siblings were still alive and living in Char Gar Bing. Hing's sister Nan had died when Hing was still a child and she had been aware of this passing. The Concubine's Children ends with a chapter describing this trip and the first meeting between then, 57-year-old Hing/Winnie and her siblings.

== Media adaptations ==
Before being published as a novel, The Concubine's Children appeared as an article in the magazine Saturday Night. Indeed, the editor of this magazine, John Fraser, was instrumental in encouraging Denise Chong to produce her book. Since then The Concubine's Children has been converted into a stage play, by Chong herself. The play debuted in 2004 at TheatreOne in Nanaimo, BC, directed by Rick Scott.

== Awards and honours ==
The Concubine's Children has won several awards including: The "City of Vancouver Book Award" in 1994; The "Edna Staebler Award for Creative Non-Fiction"; and The "VanCity Book Prize". The book was on the bestseller list of The Globe and Mail for 93 weeks, and was shortlisted for the "Governor-General's Literary Non-Fiction Award". The Concubine's Children has been translated into several languages.

== Bibliography ==
- Chong, Denise. The Concubine’s Children: Portrait of a Family Divided. Toronto: Penguin Books. 304 pp. January 1, 1995. ISBN 9780140254273
