= Nanzui =

Nanzui 南嘴镇
- town
- Location in Hunan
- Coordinates: 29°03′01″N 112°18′20″E
- Country: People's Republic of China
- Province: Hunan
- Prefecture-level city: Yiyang
- County-level city: Yuanjiang

Area
  - Total: 54.82 km^{2} (21.17 sq mi)

Population
  - Total: 20,600
  - Density: 376/km^{2} (973/sq mi)
- Time zone: UTC+8 (China Standard)
- Area code: 0737

Nanzui Town (simplified Chinese: 南嘴镇; traditional Chinese: 南嘴鎮; pinyin: Nánzuǐ zhèn) is an urban town in Yuanjiang, Yiyang, Hunan Province, People's Republic of China.

== Administrative divisions ==
The town is divided into 11 villages and one community, which include the following areas: Xinnan Community, Nanzui Village, Xingnan Village, Yubaixin Village, Liyang Village, Xibanshanzhou Village, Lishan Village, Hexie Village, Zhaogonghu Village, Mupinghunan Village, Mupinghubei Village, and Nanzuiyu Village (新南社区、南嘴村、兴南村、余百新村、鲤羊村、西畔山洲村、蠡山村、和谐村、赵公湖村、目平湖南村、目平湖北村、南嘴渔村).
