= Zhang Zhenshi =

Chinese portrait painter (1914–1992)

- Born: 1914; Liaoyang, Liaoning, China
- Died: 1992 (aged 77–78); Beijing, China
- Known for: Painting
- Notable work: Portrait of Mao Zedong

Zhang Zhenshi (Chinese: 张振仕; 1914–1992) was a Chinese portrait painter and fine art educator. He is known for his portraits of the Chinese leader Mao Zedong, one of which has become the most reproduced image of Mao of all time. The paintings are among the most famous portraits in China.

== Life ==
Born in Liaoyang of Liaoning Province, Zhang graduated from the Western Painting Department of the Jinghua Art Academy in 1936. He would later serve as a teacher at National Beiping Art Training School, editor-in-chief of the journal Art and Life (艺术与生活, Yishu yu shenghuo), deputy-editor of Chahar Illustrated (察哈尔画报, Chaha'er huabao), and as a professor at Liaoning Provincial Art Training School, National Changbai Normal College, and the Central Academy for Industrial Art.

In 1977, he produced the portrait of Zhou Enlai that can be seen in the National Museum of China and was awarded the title of "advanced worker" by the Ministry of Light Industry and the Central Academy for Industrial Art.

== Portrait of Mao Zedong ==
Zhang is best known for his portrait of a solemn Mao Zedong dressed in a simple gray tunic. Commissioned as one of 30 paintings of the chairman, in honor of the first anniversary of the founding of the People's Republic of China, the portrait was Mao's favorite and reproduced on posters throughout China.

From 1950 to 1957, he was on the team that created the huge oil painting of Mao Zedong hanging from the Tiananmen (which is modeled on Zhang's portrait).

=== Original ===
Zhang's original portrait was set to go on auction on 3 June 2006 through the Beijing Huachen Auction Company (at an estimated value of US$120,000), with no location restrictions on its sale. After an outcry from the Chinese public, many of whom still revere Mao and feared the historic painting could leave China, the auction was halted and the painting was eventually sold to the National Museum of China, with co-financing by the State Administration of Cultural Heritage.
