= 1989 Mao portrait vandalism incident =

Incident during the Tiananmen Square protests

During the Tiananmen Square protests of 1989, the portrait of Mao Zedong at Tiananmen was defaced. At 2:00 pm, May 23, 1989, three young protesters from Liuyang, Hunan, posted banners on the wall of the Tiananmen gate's passway. The slogans on the banners read, Time to End the Five Thousand Years of Autocracy (Chinese: 五千年专制到此可以告一段落！; pinyin: Wǔqiān nián zhuānzhì dào cǐ kěyǐ gào yīduànluò!) and Time to End the Cult of Personality (Chinese: 个人崇拜从今可以休矣; pinyin: Gèrén chóngbài cóng jīn kěyǐ xiū yǐ). Shortly after, they threw eggs filled with pigment at the portrait of Mao Zedong on the Tiananmen Gate.

They were immediately caught by members of the Beijing Students' Autonomous Federation (Chinese: 北京高校学生自治联合会, abbr. 高自联). At 5:00 pm, they were forced to appear in a press conference and admitted that their activities were totally irrelevant to the movement. At 7:00 pm, they were handed to Beijing Municipal Public Security Bureau. On a TV program broadcast the same day, members of the Movement claimed that they had nothing to do with the three youths, and criticized them. At 10:00 pm, the defaced portrait of Mao Zedong was taken down and replaced by a spare.

== The incident ==
The initial goal of the three was to support the Beijing students. Upon their arrival in the city on May 19, they joined the students in the protest. But their ultimate aim was different from the students'. The students were mostly anti-corruption and sought reform of the party, while the three from Hunan sought to overthrow the Communist Party altogether and the installation of a democratic government. Yu Zhijian and Yu Dongyue had been sending their advice and proclamations to the student leaders, but they received no response. On May 22 the three began planning the defacement of Mao's portrait after they saw no use talking to the students further. The next day, they bought twenty eggshells, filled them with paint, and threw them at the portrait. After the vandalism, they were apprehended by student security, and were taken to a tent for questioning. The three were initially optimistic about meeting with the student leaders and telling them about the symbolic significance of their action. However, the students feared that the three were government spies sent to discredit the protesters. The students, in an attempt to quickly distinguish themselves from the vandals, sent the three from Hunan to the police. After several days of interrogation, they appeared before a judge and received their respective sentences.

== Original perpetrators in 1989 ==
=== Yu Dongyue ===
Yu was a propaganda photographer in Liuyang and five years younger than his co-perpetrators Lu Decheng and Yu Zhijian. After the three were imprisoned, they were briefly reunited in the same prison. Yu Dongyue and Yu Zhijian urged Lu Decheng not to resist the party and to live on so that he can serve as the only one of the three to communicate with the outside world. Yu Dongyue was sentenced to 20 years in prison. He developed schizophrenia in 1992 while in prison, and was released on commutation of sentence in February 2006. He arrived in the United States in 2009 and obtained political asylum. He settled in Indianapolis where Yu Zhijian was also taking care of him, while the former suffers from mental illness after torture in prison.

=== Lu Decheng ===
Lu was a high school graduate and mechanic in Liuyang. He often felt inferior to his two friends because of his lack of education. He described his father as cowardly and generally did not have a good relationship with him throughout his life. In his earlier years prior to the student protest of 1989, Lu eloped with his wife in order to escape government and societal pressure on unlawful marriage and pregnancy. Both of whom were below the legal marital age at the time. Their child was therefore considered illegitimate. Their first child died while the second survived. Yu Zhijian and Lu were childhood friends. After Lu was sent to jail, he was seen by the party as the only one of the three who could be changed because he was less educated than his friends, for which he resisted. His wife eventually divorced him after years of faithfulness because of a misunderstanding between the two. Lu Decheng was sentenced to 16 years in jail, and released in 1998 on bail. After his release, he was approached by former student protesters, who would eventually help him escape China. He left China for Thailand in 2004, but was arrested by the local police for illegal immigration. He finally arrived in Canada on April 11, 2006, and obtained political asylum.

=== Yu Zhijian ===
Yu Zhijian was a teacher back in Hunan, he demonstrated on numerous occasions his dissatisfaction with the administration of the schools, for which he was transferred to the countryside and demoted. Upon their decision to throw eggs at the portrait, he and Yu Dongyue brought up the idea that their actions would be symbolic and would serve a greater purpose although they discussed other options: "We'd come all this way to Beijing, and we had to live up to our duty. Yu Dongyue was so upset and saddened that he proposed we self-immolate as a group. We came up with several plans. For example, we could stand on Gold Water Bridge, pour gasoline over ourselves and light it up. The effect was sure to be dramatic. But what goal were we trying to achieve?". After throwing eggs on Mao's portrait, Yu Zhijian was sentenced to life imprisonment, but was released in 2009 on bail. He eventually arrived in the United States in 2009 and obtained political asylum and settled in Indianapolis where he was also taking care of Yu Dongyue, who suffers from mental illness after torture in prison. He died on March 30, 2017, in Indianapolis worried "that his fervent gesture would fade from minds, and that the spectre of Mao would remain". The Economist published his obituary on June 8, 2017.

== Post-1989 vandalism of the portrait ==
At least three other incidents have occurred since the three from Hunan threw eggs at Mao's portrait.

The first one occurred in May 2007. The vandal's name was Gu Haiou, a 35-year-old unemployed man from Ürümqi, as reported by the official Xinhua news agency. Gu hurled a burning object at the portrait, causing partial damage. The Square was then sealed off to replace the portrait and security was tightened afterward. Neither the government nor the police gave any response to the incident and its perpetrator. It was known that Gu was detained by the police, but his current whereabouts are still unknown.

The second incident occurred in April 2010. The protester was only identified as Mr. Chen by the police, who came to Beijing from Heilongjiang to raise individual and human rights issues. At early afternoon on April 5, Mr. Chen threw a plastic bottle of ink at the portrait in resonance with the 1989 incident. He was later detained by the Beijing municipal police and his current status is unknown.

The third incident occurred on March 5, 2014. Protesters gathered on the square hoping to attract the attention of the annual National People's Congress that began on March 5. Their goal was to petition the government about their grievances, though the details of their grievances were unknown. As part of the protest, an unidentified man aged around 30 threw ink on the lower left hand corner of the portrait. He was quickly detained by the police, and immediately afterward, the police had set up a 200-metre perimeter in an attempt to conceal what had taken place.

== See also ==
- Portraits overlooking Tiananmen
