= Tire fire =

Events involving the combustion of tires

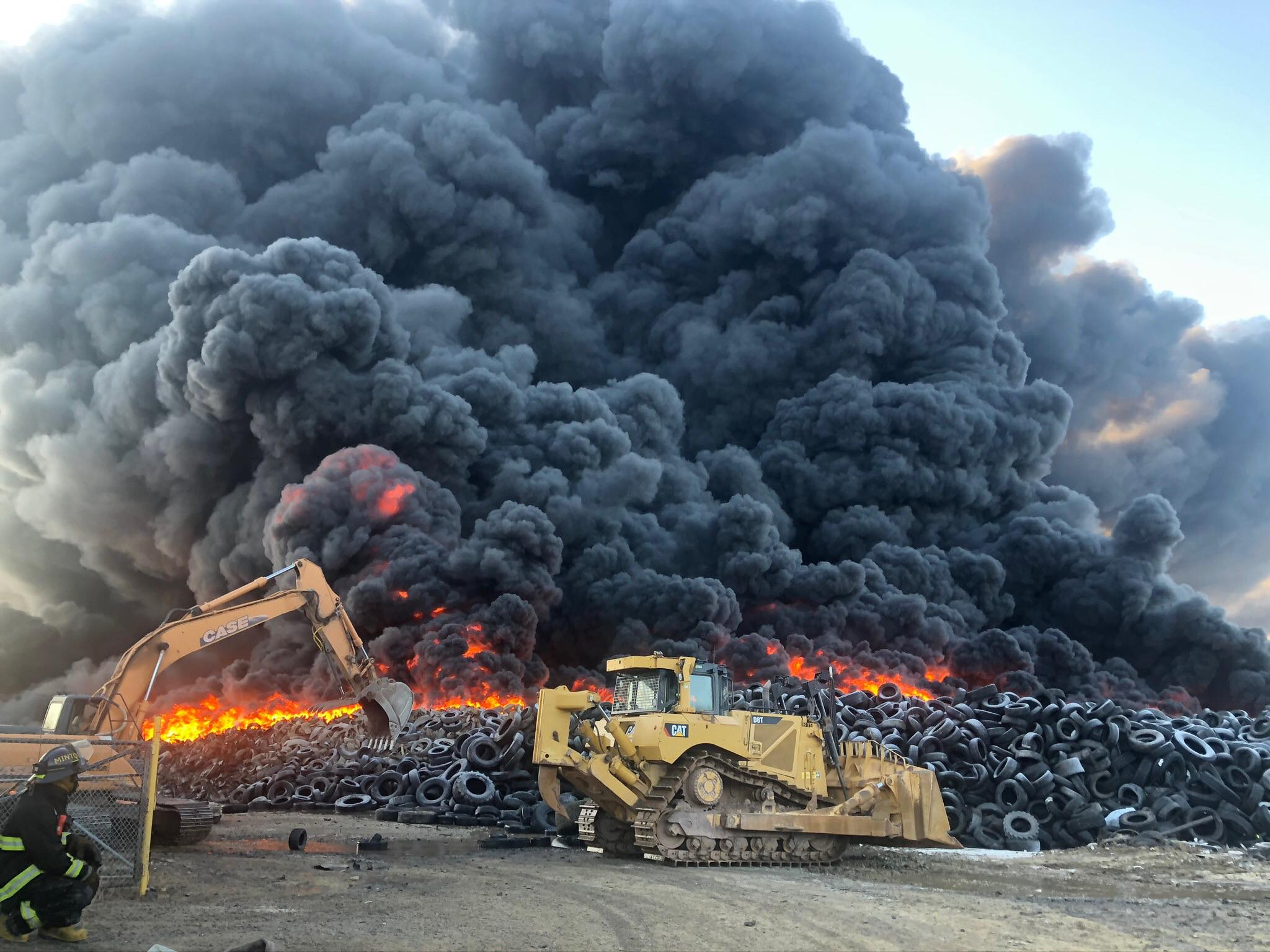
A tire fire in Minto, New Brunswick, Canada

Tire fires are events that involve the combustion of large quantities of tires, usually waste tires, typically in locations where they are stored, dumped, or processed. They exist in two forms: fast-burning combustion and slow-burning pyrolysis that can continue for more than a decade. Tire fires are difficult to extinguish. They produce much smoke, which carries toxic chemicals from the breakdown of synthetic rubber compounds while burning.

Tire fires are normally the result of arson or improper manipulation with open fire. Igniting a tire requires heating it to at least 400 degrees Celsius (750 degrees Fahrenheit) for several minutes, so tires are not prone to spontaneous combustion.

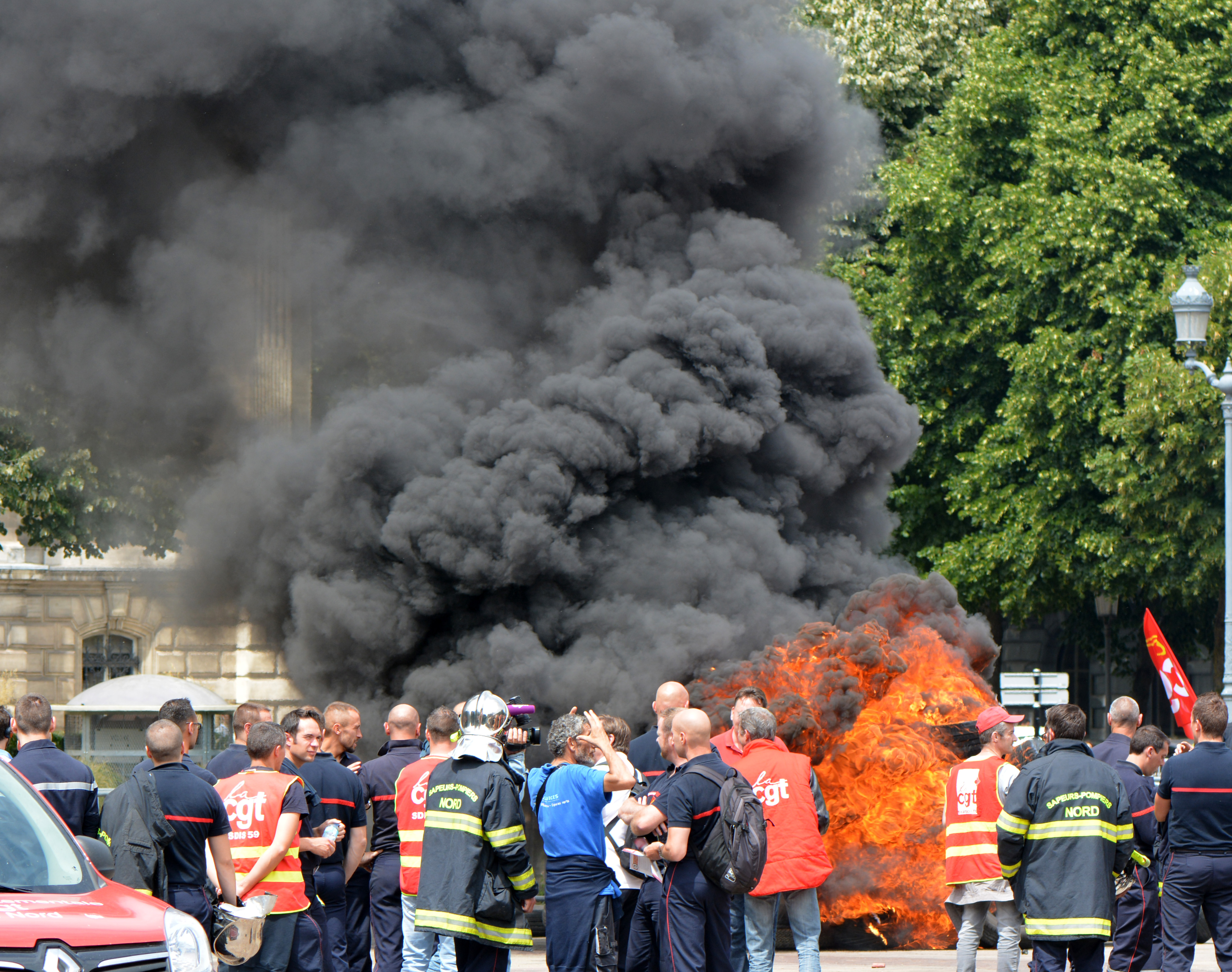
A deliberately set fire during a protest in Lille, France, observed by emergency workers waiting to manage the fire

When tires are piled up and get wet, water may diffuse to the carcasses and steel will rust; this is an exothermic reaction (oxidation). Rubber itself is a good insulator, and within the masses temperature will continuously rise. At about 60 degrees Celsius, rotten rubber will emit methane and later cyclic hydrocarbons as toluol and xylol—highly flammable and volatile substances. These fumes may easily be ignited, and the process within the pile is continued. The combustion temperature of degraded compounds released by heated tires is thus more consequential than the combustion point of the tires themselves.

Metal in tires may contribute to the tire fire. The hot wires act as kind of "glowing spiral" in a storm lighter with its steel insert in the wick, restarting the fire, when blown out. This is a reason tire fires are so hard to extinguish.

Extinguishing tire fires is difficult. The fire releases a dark, rich smoke that contains cyanide, carbon monoxide, sulfur dioxide, and products of butadiene and styrene. Burning tires are heated, and, as they have a low thermal conductivity, they are difficult to cool down. Moreover, they frequently burn inside even if they are extinguished from outside, and easily reignite when hot. One possible remedy is to cover the fire with sand, reducing the supply of oxygen and the exhaust of smoke. After extinguishing and cooling down (which may last several days), toxic chemicals can be neutralized.

== Use in protest ==
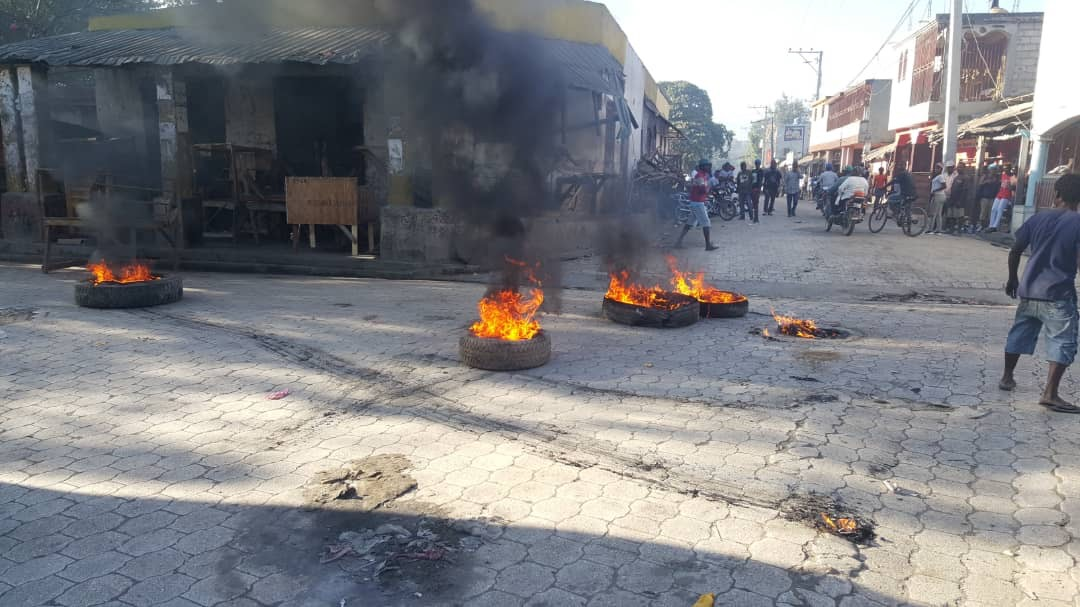
Tires being burned as part of the 2018–2023 Haitian crisis

Protestors are known to burn tires as part of protests. Because waste tires are readily available and produce dense smoke, protestors sometimes burn tires and create tire barriers as part of protest. For example, an analysis in The Times of Israel noticed an increasing trend of tire burning in the demonstrations following the 17 October Revolution.

== Notable tire fires ==
Some notable tire fires include:

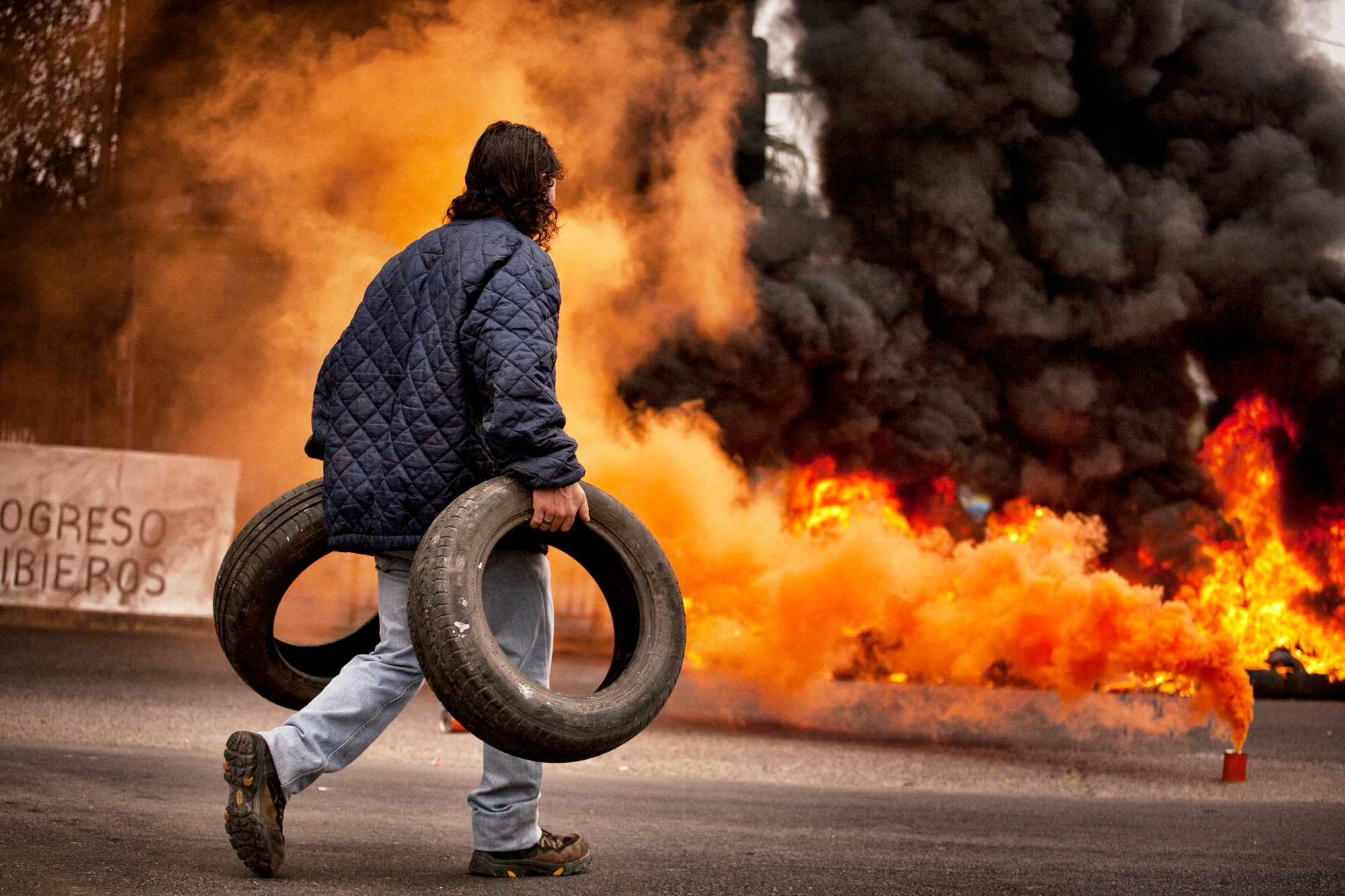
Tire fire used during protests

- 1983: Arsonists ignited seven million tires that burned for nine months in Winchester, Virginia, polluting nearby areas with lead and arsenic. The location was cleaned up as a Superfund project from 1983 to 2002.
- 1984: A pile estimated at four million tires, known locally as Mount Firestone, ignited in Everett, Washington, and burned for months; the fire department was unable to extinguish it.
- 1989: In Heyope (near Knighton, Powys, Wales), a fire involving about 10 million tires still smouldered 15 years later.
- 1990: In Hagersville, Ontario, a fire started in a pile of 12 to 14 million tires; it burned for 17 days and forced 4,000 people to evacuate.
- 1993 - In Inwood, Berkeley County, West Virginia, Charles David Knox, a local volunteer firefighter, set fire to a 10-acre pile of tires; the fire burned for 3 days before being brought under control. Firefighters were called from as far away as Texas. The 1993 Inwood tire fire response became the textbook example on fighting tire fires; some techniques are still used today.
- 1994: In East Chicago, Indiana, a fire consumed 70,000 tons of tires and shredded rubber. It burned from July 16 to August 22.
- 1995: The Hornburg tire fire in Sinclairville, New York, burned over a million tires in a blaze lasting more than a week.
- 1995 - In Grawn, Michigan, a tire fire from a retreading service at 5175 Sawyer Woods Drive burned for three weeks and resulted in PFAS contamination of local residential drinking water wells. The fire began on December 29.
- 1996: Arson at an illegal tire yard under I-95 in Philadelphia caused $6 million in damage; it closed a section of the highway for weeks and partially closed it for six months.
- 1998: A grass fire ignited the 7 million tires at the unlicensed S.F. Royster Tire Disposal Facility in Tracy, California. It was extinguished with water and foam after 26 months.
- 1999: On August 21, arsonists ignited the former Kirby Tire Recycling facility, containing an estimated 25 million tires located on 110 acres (0.45 km^{2}) near Sycamore, Ohio. The fire burned for 30 hours, involved over 250 firefighters, the Ohio National Guard and the U.S. Environmental Protection Agency (EPA), and caused environmental damage. The fire was controlled and extinguished in part by covering it with dirt. Since then the EPA has performed a massive cleanup effort on the site.
- 1999: Lightning struck a tire dump in Westley, California, which burned for 30 days. Pyrolitic oil flowed into a nearby stream and ignited.
- 2002: The EnTire Tire Recycling facility in Nebraska City, Nebraska, burned for more than 11 days. An explosion during the firefighting effort injured 13 firefighters. Multiple evacuations of up to a 30-block area were ordered during the event. Over 40 agencies assisted during the event at an estimated cost of $1.4 million.
- 2005: A fire started at Watertown Tire Recyclers in Watertown, Wisconsin, on July 19 and burned for six days. 108 fire departments and more than 25 agencies helped to handle the disaster.
- 2008: A malfunction in the chopper/shredder line of the Golden By-Products tire recycling plant in Ballico, California, ignited rubber debris around the conveyor system which then ignited two multi-ton piles of shredded/chopped rubber. It burned for about 12 hours and required more than 1 million gallons of water to extinguish. The piles were allowed to form a crust which in turn smothered the fires in them. The plant was later cited for exceeding permitted capacity.
- 2012: On January 27, a tire fire at a tire recycling plant in Lockport, New York, put dangerous amounts of soot and smoke over the city for over 22 hours, seriously damaging many homes.
- 2012: In Sulaibiya, Kuwait, a five-million-tire fire erupted on April 16. The fire was thought to be started deliberately by scrap metal hawkers looking to recover scrap metal.
- 2012: In Iowa City, Iowa, at about 6:45 p.m. on May 26, a fire started in the ground tire bedding material at the Iowa City Landfill, involving at least 7.5 acres of landfill. It was extinguished on June 12, after a "stir, burn and cover" operation.
- 2012: Tire fire protests erupted all over Lebanon. Protesters used burning tires to cut off main roads in Lebanon.
- 2013: Static electricity ignited a fire at J&R Tire Recycling in Hoopeston, Illinois. Over 100 firefighters from two states fought the fire, in which over 50,000 tires burned, for three days.
- 2013: Tire fire ignited in Nassau, Bahamas. The poorly managed municipal dump has had multiple fires and finally resulted in a tire fire on August 13.
- 2014: Tire fire ignited in Savannah, Georgia, U.S., on February 8, 2014.
- 2015: On August 18, in northwest Oklahoma, a tire fire in a large pile of tires next to the premises of A&T Tire and Wheel set the exterior of the business ablaze, but crews prevented flames from getting inside.
- 2015: On August 18, a fire in Oregon disrupted the Warm Springs Tribal Reservation. Erroneously referred to by locals and news media as a "tire fire", the blaze caused by the sparks formed from a recreational vehicle driving on a bare rim engulfed more than 60,000 acres of land at the reservation.
- 2016: On May 13, in Seseña, Spain, a fire started in a tire dump containing around 5 million tires.
- 2016: On August 10, a tire fire sparked at Liberty Tire Recycling in Lockport, New York. Over 8 million pounds of crumb rubber ignited, destroying four buildings and evacuating over 400 families from nearby homes.
- 2017: On January 17, a tire fire started at Federal Corporation Zhongli Factory in Taoyuan, Taiwan. More than half the factory (50,000 square meters) was on fire and over 140 families were evacuated from nearby homes. The area was heavily contaminated with carbon black.
- 2017: On March 5 at 10:58 pm, firefighters responded to a fire at the EnTire Recycling facility in Phelps City, Missouri. Heavy smoke caused intermittent closure of Highway 136 and officials to advise nearby residents to avoid breathing the smoke, which could be seen over 10 miles away. This fire continued to smolder through August 2017.
- 2020: On July 22, firefighters in Weld County, Colorado responded to a fire at a tire recycling facility. Early reports suggested a fire began on equipment which quickly spread to piles of tires. Local officials requested aid from a supertanker aircraft due to the size of the fire and unseasonably dry conditions.
- 2020: On October 18, a massive fire in the Sulaibiya tire graveyard, the site of a similar fire in 2012, burned approximately 1 million tires in 25,000 square meters.
- 2020: On November 16, 90 firefighters and 15 appliances attended a major fire involving 600,000 tires stored at a former go-karting facility in Bradford, England. The fire was declared out a week later. Three people were arrested in connection to the fire, however they were later released without charge.
- 2021: On November 9, approximately 100 firefighters responded to a tire fire at a recycling facility in southwest Philadelphia. Unusual winds brought the fire's smoke across Philadelphia's Center City and into New Jersey.
- 2022: On October 13, a protestor started a tire fire on Sitong Bridge in Beijing, China. The protester, dubbed "Bridge Man", used a tire fire to bring passersby attention to an unfurled banner criticising General Secretary of the Chinese Communist Party Xi Jinping and the Zero-COVID policy.

== In popular culture ==
In popular culture the phrase is used to mean a horrifying mess that seems to last forever.

The TV show The Simpsons is set in a fictional town called Springfield, which features a permanent tire fire.

== See also ==
- Necklacing, an execution and torture method involving the victim being placed in a burning rubber tire
- Tire recycling
- Dumpster fire
- Beijing Sitong Bridge protest
- Burnout
