= 2025 Chongqing anti-CCP protest =

- Part of protest and dissent in China
- Date: August 29, 2025; 13 months ago
- Time: Around 22:00 (UTC+8; Beijing Time)
- Location: Chongqing University Town, Chongqing, China; 29.60946°N 106.29970°E
- Type: Remote projection protest
- Cause: Protest against the Chinese Communist Party rule; Discontent with state surveillance of citizens; Protest against the CCP's "patriotric education"; Opposition to the 2025 China Victory Day Parade; Opposition to CCP narratives about Chinese unification; Imitation of the 2022 Beijing Sitong Bridge protest
- Participants: Qi Hong
- Outcome: Projection lasted about 50 minutes before being shut down by police; Activist's family in China was questioned by authorities; Related videos spread widely on social media; Related topics were restricted from search on Chinese video platforms

At approximately 22:00 on August 29, 2025 (Beijing time), in Xijie, Chongqing University Town, Shapingba District, Chongqing, China, an individual used a projector to display slogans critical of the Chinese Communist Party onto the exterior wall of a building. The projection lasted about 50 minutes before being stopped by the authorities, and attracted considerable public attention.

The event occurred on the eve of the 2025 China Victory Day Parade (also called the 'September 3 Parade'), and was described by commentators as notable given the Chinese government's strict suppression of any public displays of dissent under CCP General Secretary Xi Jinping. Observers have drawn comparisons between this incident and the 2022 Beijing Sitong Bridge protest.

== Background ==
The incident took place on the eve of the Chinese Communist Party's 2025 China Victory Day Parade (or "September 3 Military Parade"), an event held to commemorate the 80th anniversary of the end of the Second Sino-Japanese War and World War II. In the lead-up to this large-scale parade, the Chinese government's control over public opinion and dissenting voices had reached an unprecedented level.

Prior to this, sporadic protests had still occurred in China despite heavy crackdowns on dissent, most notably the 2022 Beijing Sitong Bridge protest. Activist Peng Lifa had unfurled banners protesting against zero-COVID policies and Xi Jinping, making international news. Although Peng was later arrested and incarcerated, his actions were reported to have inspired others. The Sitong Bridge incident is regarded as a turning point, signaling the emergence of public opposition within China and sparking a wave of similar acts of resistance. Subsequently, various creative protests appeared across China, including the so-called "Toilet Revolution" (Chinese: 厕所革命), in which slogans were written in public restrooms and university campus bathrooms.

== Incident ==
The projection action began at around 22:00 on August 29 and lasted nearly 50 minutes. The projected slogans included: "Down with the Red Fascists, overthrow the Communist Party's tyranny"; "Without the Communist Party there can be a New China, freedom is not a gift but something to be reclaimed", referencing the CCP song "Without the Communist Party, There Would Be No New China"; "Arise, those unwilling to be slaves, rise up and take back your rights", referencing the first line of the March of the Volunteers; and "No more lies, we want the truth; no more slavery, we want freedom; down with the tyrannical Communist Party". The projection site was near Xijie, the core commercial area of University Town, surrounded by multiple universities and heavy foot traffic.

According to social media sources, including internet activist "Teacher Li Is Not Your Teacher", police located and shut down the projection equipment about 50 minutes after the projection began. The device had been projecting from a room in Mama Apartment near Xijie. The protester had first set up remotely controlled equipment in a hotel room, including a 600W outdoor projector, three surveillance devices, a timer switch, a router, and a SIM card. However, the activist left before police arrived, leaving behind a handwritten letter addressed to them. The letter was dated August 16, indicating preparations had begun at least two weeks earlier.

The activist had installed several hidden cameras in the room, successfully recording five officers entering and struggling to turn off the projector. One officer even discovered one of the cameras. The activist later uploaded this footage online, stating that the act was meant to invert the usual dynamic of state surveillance and mock the CCP's stability maintenance mechanisms.

Multiple media outlets reported that the activist had left China with his wife and two daughters for the United Kingdom on August 20. According to the activist, he had checked into the hotel on August 10, spent ten days testing the projection, and initially displayed generic phrases. On August 29, he remotely triggered the projector from the UK ahead of schedule. He had originally planned to launch the action on September 3, the day of the parade, after students had returned to campus to maximize its impact. However, fearing that leaving the apartment unused for too long might cause problems, he decided to act earlier.

=== Handwritten letter to law enforcement ===
Radio Canada International reprinted the message left by the activist in the hotel, a handwritten note addressing the police as "friend":

Hello, my friend!
I don't know who you are, but for now I will call you "friend". Perhaps at this moment you already consider me your enemy. First, let me state clearly: I do not belong to any organization. Reaching this point was not my choice but a last resort. Who would willingly live a wandering life and give up a good and stable existence? Please do not make things difficult for unrelated people. The crimes of the Communist Party on this land are too numerous to record—please, as much as possible, do not aid their tyranny.

Perhaps you are currently a beneficiary of the system. But I believe that for most people, if you trace back three generations—or even just one—there are none who have not suffered under the Communist Party's persecution. Chinese people are simply too forgetful. Since the arrival of the Soviet Communists on this land, and even more so since they seized power, there has been a major political campaign every three years, a smaller one every ten years—how many families have been destroyed, how many lives devastated by their persecution? What do they have besides lies? They are fascists.

Perhaps you are a beneficiary now, but on this land, one day you will certainly become a victim. Still, within your ability, treat others kindly. If you are truly left with no choice, then you can at least lift your weapon slightly upward. The Communist Party rules by lies and suppresses with violence those righteous people and brave individuals who dare to speak out. In short, wake up and seek the truth. The truth is simply the truth—like clouds blocking the sun, it does not mean the sun is gone. If everyone contributes a little and stands up to resist, those wrongdoers will no longer be able to act with impunity.
Best wishes, my friend.

— Qi Hong
11:00 p.m., August 16, 2025, at Mama Hotel, Chongqing University Town

== Activist and motivation ==
The activist, Qi Hong, was 43 years old during the time of the incident and was from a remote mountainous area of Chongqing. He dropped out of school due to poverty when he was 16 and later worked in multiple locations. In Guangdong and Beijing, he was repeatedly detained and beaten for lacking a temporary residence permit and being mistakenly identified as a Falun Gong practitioner. In 2006, he started a Taobao e-commerce business in Beijing, gradually stabilizing his life. In 2013, he closed the online store and ran a parcel collection point in a village in Changping District, Beijing.

Before leaving Beijing, he witnessed government violent demolitions of small-property houses, which deepened his understanding of state coercion. In 2021, due to issues related to his daughter's schooling, he moved his family back to Chongqing and worked as an electrician.

In May 2025, Qi Hong posted a statement on his WeChat account, expecting it to be banned: "We want democracy, not dictatorship!" Surprisingly to him, the account was not banned; and he considered it a turning point. Following this, in July of the same year, the hosting of the 2025 China Victory Day Parade, or the "September 3 Parade", was announced. The extensive amounts of political propaganda leading up to the Parade, especially those with anti-U.S. and anti-Japanese messages, made Qi Hong deeply concerned about China's future, triggering his actions. He pointed out that such blind patriotism and historical revisionism would damage young people's minds, fostering hatred and destruction. He attributed his "sense of awakening" to the books he read, including 1984, Animal Farm, and Brave New World. He has educated his two daughters to think independently from a young age, using Taiwan as an example to challenge official narratives of "reunification".

In interviews, he cited Peng Lifa of the 2022 Beijing Sitong Bridge protest and the White Paper Protests as his main sources of inspiration. He was also influenced by Chai Song, who remotely projected slogans in 2023. He chose University Town for the projection to plant seeds of resistance in students' minds.

Qi Hong taught himself projection techniques and personally created the slogans, combining the national anthem phrase "Arise, those unwilling to be slaves" along with popular contemporary terms as the main signature. Combined with this anti-surveillance action, he aimed to expose what he identified as the authoritarian and fascist nature of CCP rule. He stated that the projection used ordinary items because restricting such items would seem strange to the public, prompting thought and embarrassing the authorities. He acknowledged that authorities might tighten accommodation registration checks, but argued that unless officials banned everyone from leaving home, such actions could not be fully prevented, making projection an effective method to increase the cost of state stability measures. He opposes the fostering of hatred between Taiwan and China, but, disagreeing with Taiwan's stance, did not plan to seek asylum there and instead moved to the UK to start a new life.

== Aftermath ==
Although Qi Hong operated the projection remotely from abroad, Chinese authorities retaliated. Police issued no official statement, but on the next day (August 30), they detained one of Qi Hong's brothers and a friend, questioned his mother at the family home, and confiscated his personal belongings, including computers and books. Qi Hong, however, had anticipated the interrogation and had secretly installed surveillance cameras that recorded the entire process, which he later posted online, generating potential controversy over law enforcement conduct.

Radio Free Asia reported that students around University Town were also affected. A recent graduate said that after the slogans appeared, news quickly spread in class groups: "Everyone was sharing it, saying it was shocking and a little nerve-wracking." Counselors immediately issued warnings in the group chats, instructing students to "speak less and avoid commenting". On August 30, the campus atmosphere had noticeably changed, with plainclothes police stationed throughout the area and additional checkpoints at school entrances.

== Response ==
The incident's videos quickly drew widespread attention online. Within four days, footage of the projected slogans had over 18 million views. Many Chinese netizens called Qi Hong the "Chongqing Warrior" and expressed gratitude, viewing his technical creativity as inspirational. In an interview with Chinese-American journalist Yuan Li, Qi Hong described himself as "an ordinary person" and said he "did not want to keep talking in a cesspool." He emphasized that the sole purpose of his action was "to express himself", arguing that since the government uses surveillance cameras to monitor citizens, he could use the same method to "monitor" them. The livestream of this interview gained over 200,000 views in a single day.

=== Media commentary ===
In an interview with Deutsche Welle, Qi Hong criticized Chinese authorities for repeatedly emphasizing Japanese atrocities during the invasion of China while failing to reflect on the countless tragedies caused by the government itself during the Chinese Civil War, Land Reform Movement, the Great Leap Forward, the Cultural Revolution, and the 1989 Tiananmen Square protests and massacre. He said this selective historical narrative made him "unable to endure it any longer".

The social media account Teacher Li Is Not Your Teacher commented that Qi Hong "outsmarted the police and successfully manipulated state machinery", calling it an "extremely cool" action. They noted that Qi Hong's success, despite authorities deploying extensive resources to maintain stability ahead of the September 3 parade, "seriously undermined" the government and demonstrated that CCP control is not airtight.

Japanese journalist Akio Yaita stated that the content of Qi Hong's letter to the police represented the "truth about China".

The New York Times requested a comment from Chongqing police regarding the incident; the department did not respond.

== See also ==
- Protest and dissent in China
- Mass incidents in China
- Democracy movements of China
- Anti-communism in China
- Anti–People's Republic of China sentiment
