= Burned Out =

Burned Out may refer to:

- "Burned Out", song from Sevendust album Seasons
- "Burned Out", song from Blues Pills album Lady in Gold
- Burnt Out, a 2005 French film starring Olivier Gourmet
- "Burned Out", a song by Dodie Clark from Human

== See also ==
- Burnout (disambiguation)
