= Hagersville Tire Fire =

1990 tire fire near Hagersville, Ontario, Canada

Coordinates: 42.9542°N 80.1615°W

The Hagersville Tire Fire, sparked on 12 February 1990, was a major tire fire at Tyre King Tire Recycling facility near Hagersville, Ontario, Canada. At the time, Tyre King was already under scrutiny by the Province of Ontario as an environmental hazard. Firefighters from twenty-four different departments fought the fire for seventeen days. Eventually it consumed fourteen million tires and burned the equivalent of eighteen football fields. The province spent fifteen to twenty-five million dollars to extinguish it and it displaced up to 4,000 residents and produced a significant amount of toxic smoke and ash. Investigators later determined that the fire was likely caused by five arsonists, one of whom pleaded guilty and testified against the other four, who were charged with mischief and sentenced to prison times between one month and four months. The fire was officially put out on 1 March 1990.

Residents, firefighters, and the broader environment all sustained potentially significant health effects and damages as a result of residue and the inhalation of ash. Notable consequences of the fire include emotional and medical damages to residents, economic damage in the form of lost revenues for food vendors, and the proliferation of oily runoff as a result of firefighting efforts. Reporting surrounding the event provided a catalyst for the Province of Ontario and other Canadian jurisdictions to update their regulations for tire management and storage.

== The site ==
=== Hagersville and surrounding area ===
Hagersville, Ontario is a small, rural community in Haldimand County; the county's population in 1991 was 20,573. The community is approximately 35 kilometres south of Hamilton, Ontario and is connected to that city by Highway 6. The Grand River, which flows roughly ten kilometres east of the community, meanders through the county towards Lake Erie and contributes to a robust agricultural sector throughout the region. North of Hagersville are 46,000 acres of reserve lands held by the Six Nations of the Grand River, including the community of Ohsweken. The community previously served as an Air Force training facility during World War Two; some of the infrastructure associated with this military installation remains standing about twelve kilometres southwest of the community. To the south of the area is Nanticoke Generating Station, which at the time of the Hagersville tire fire was a coal-fired power plant and the seventh-largest single source of greenhouse gas emissions in the country.

=== Tyre King Tire Recycling, Ltd. and facilities ===
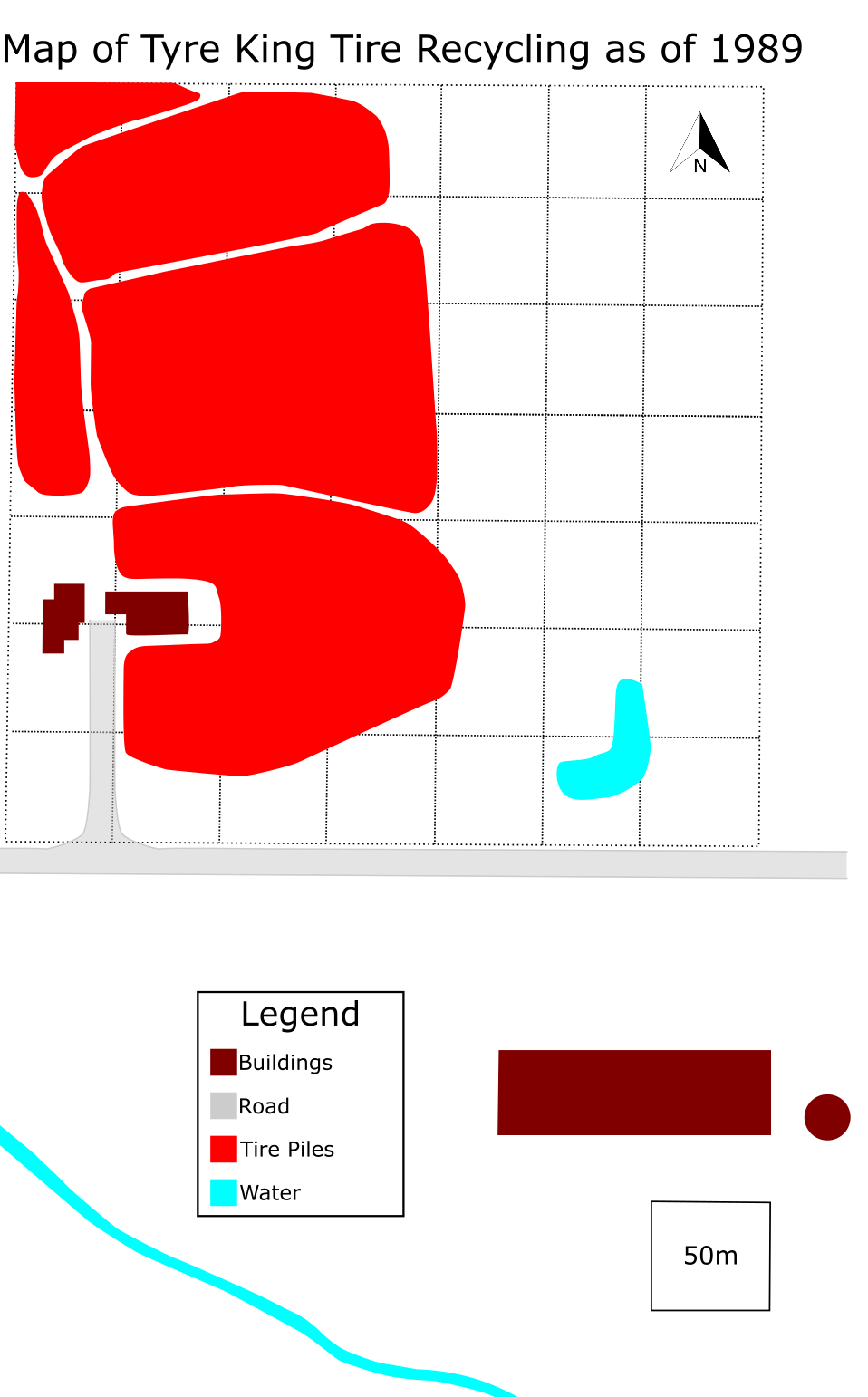
A 1:2,000 scale sketch of the layout of the Tyre King Tyre Recycling Facility before the fire

Tyre King Tyre Recycling Ltd. was a company operating at Concession 14 in the former township of Walpole. Despite the association of Hagersville with the event, this location is in fact in Nanticoke, a neighbouring community to the south. A thorough description of the landscape surrounding the Tyre King tire dump was reported in a National Research Council Canada report on the Hagersville tire fire:

The Tyre King tire dump is located on 6.9 hectares of land in a rural area near HagersvilIe, Ontario, which is about 35 kilometres south of Hamilton. The terrain is generally flat but well-drained, with agricultural fields or pasture land neighbouring the property on all sides. A layer of clay-based soil approximately 1 metre deep covers the limestone bedrock. Surface water drains from north to south across the property to a small creek (Sandusk Creek) located 300 metres south of the property. Sandusk Creek drains into Lake Erie, and serves as a water supply for agricultural enterprises along the way.

The facility was owned and operated by Ed Straza, who intended to recycle the tires but was unable to find a market for them. According to Guy Crittenden, Straza spent two years resisting orders from the Province of Ontario to mitigate the risk of fire on the basis of financial hardship. On 6 April 1989, the Ontario Environmental Appeal Board issued a judgment declaring that the practices of Tyre King Tyre Recycling, Ltd. "represent a major environmental hazard". While the judgment stated that the risk of fire was low, a fire would have profound ecological consequences. Because of this, the facility was barred from collecting additional tires after 1989 and required to organize tires into 10 foot piles with adequate fire lanes between piles. Another ruling from the Environmental Appeal Board, that the perimeter of the facility be fenced, was not carried out when the facility caught fire, and the nearest source of water to the facility was a pond approximately 250 meters away.

== The fire ==
At 1am on 12 February 1990, five youths set fire to the northwest corner pile of tires held by Ed Straza, using gasoline as an accelerant. By the end of the first day of the fire, the entire facility was ablaze and flames could be seen nearly one meter above the piles. Living in Ohsweken, George Beaver reported "black globules of rubber" on the snow in front of his home on 14 February along with a heavy plume of thick, black smoke. Initially outmatched by the intensity of the fire, volunteer firefighters limited their efforts to attacking the perimeter of the fire until the Ministry of Natural Resources, the Ontario Fire College, and others arrived on 17 February 1990. Attempts to use water bombers to attack the fire proved difficult due to cold temperatures, meaning that the combined forces of 24 fire departments largely had to attack the fire on foot. By 21 February, the fire's core was 2000 degrees Fahrenheit (1093 degrees Celsius), with a footprint of three city blocks. Nearly 1,700 residents had been advised by the Ministry of the Environment to evacuate, a number which would rise to almost 4,000 people under evacuation advisement before the flames were quenched on 1 March. The firefighting effort involved 100 volunteer firefighters and 40 professionals working for 17 days.

The resulting cleanup effort was a significant undertaking. Estimated costs to the province range from $15–25 million dollars. A water treatment facility was constructed nearby, with additional water processing being handled by a local steel plant, and an Esso facility began processing the oil generated from the burning tires. Efforts to move 50,000 tons of contaminated dirt onto a dumpsite across from the New Credit Reserve brought attendant threats of blockades from Indigenous residents. The estimated number of people under evacuation advisory varies significantly from a low number of several hundred to an upper bound approaching 4,000 people.

== Consequences ==
=== Air, soil, and water pollution ===
==== Air pollution ====
Burning tires typically produce a thick, black smoke of the sort reported in Hagersville. Paul Lemieux and Jeffrey Ryan identified an estimated 10-50g/kg of semi-volatile organic compounds, also noting the presence of zinc and lead in their model. Air toxicities of polychlorinated dibenzo-p-dioxins at Hagersville during the fire reached 50% of Ontario's provisional toxicity guidelines; after the fire was extinguished, these aerial toxins returned to background levels. Despite this return to baseline, it should not be assumed that potential negative health consequences have thereby been abated. Allen Blackman and Alejandra Palma have written a succinct summary of the potential results of air pollution incumbent to burning tires:

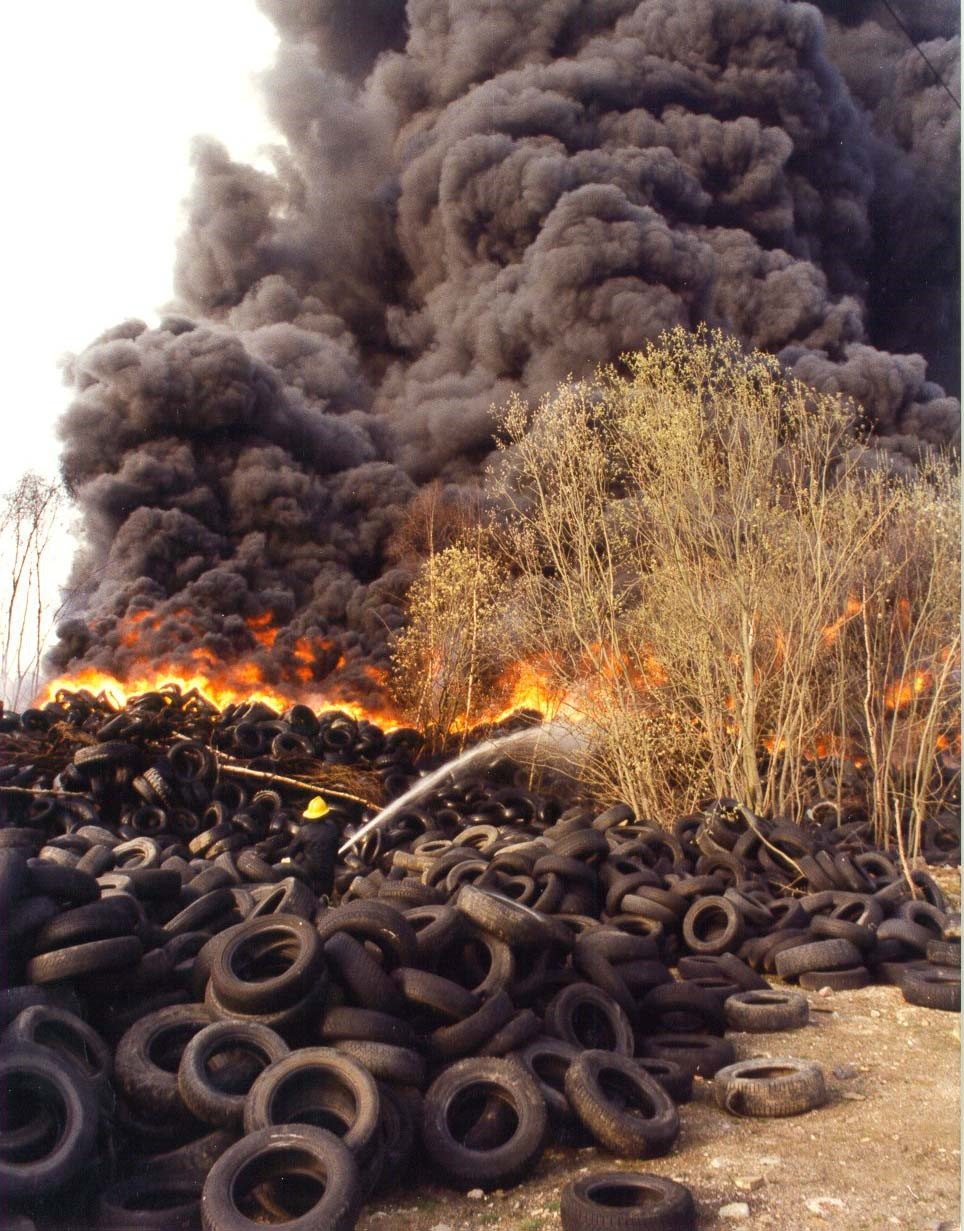
A tire fire. The thick black smoke is very typical for a tire fire and contains a variety of chemicals.

When burned in the open, tires combust incompletely and emit both conventional air pollutants (including particulates, carbon monoxide, sulfur oxides, nitrogen oxides, and volatile organic compounds) and so-called hazardous air pollutants (including polynuclear aromatic hydrocarbons, dioxins, furans, hydrogen chloride, benzene, polychlorinated biphenyles, and heavy metals such as lead and arsenic). Tire fire air pollutants can cause short-term and long-term human health problems including irritation of the skin, eyes, and mucous membranes; respiratory effects; depression of the central nervous system; and cancer. Tire fire emissions are estimated to be 16 times more mutagenic (toxic) than emissions from residential wood-burning fire places and 13,000 times more mutagenic than emissions from coal-fired utilities with good efficiencies and add-on pollution controls.

==== Soil pollution ====
For every million tires burned, the Environmental Protection Agency of the United States estimates that 55,000 gallons of flammable runoff oil are produced and released into the environment. Unlike in their survey of air quality near Hagersville, Steer et al found that contaminants present in soot deposited on Norway spruce (Picea albies) remained 200 days after the event, though they found a significant decline in contaminant concentration at sites more than 500 meters away from the fire. Soils themselves are capable of retaining "a limited number" of persistent organic contaminants; despite limited study on the consequences of tire fires on soils, novel studies are known to reveal previously-unknown contaminants.

Public perception of the impacts on soil pollution impacted Hagersville's food production economy significantly. Four meat processors and a grocery store were ordered to close by the provincial government, causing inventory loss and a loss of local faith in the quality of consumable products. Despite testing conducted by the Ministry of Agriculture which found no cause for concern in meat, eggs, milk, and crops, one local grocer took to advertising that their dairy products came from Toronto to attempt to allay fears. Ontario would spend $1.2 million dollars purchasing farms and nearby properties from residents fearful of contamination.

==== Water pollution ====
Oily run-off from tire fires is a significant problem associated with extinguishing these types of fires. While reported levels of hazardous materials in the runoff water from the site itself were elevated one month after the fire was extinguished, groundwater was protected adequately by an emergency water treatment facility and waters leaving said facility were "well within Ontario's drinking water guideline detection limits". The Ministry of Agriculture advised residents to avoid using water from Sandusk Creek; fears of water contamination caused two cattle ranchers to move their herds away from the affected area. As mentioned previously, a local steel plant assisted with the treatment of water following the tire fire. Instances of groundwater pollution as a result of tire fires have been recorded in Canada previously, as in the more recent Minto fire in New Brunswick.

=== Mental and physical health of residents ===
==== Mental health ====
Little research has been done into the impacts of tire fires specifically on the mental health of nearby residents. One study that does exist, however, is expressly focused on the Hagersville tire fire. This study found that younger people with children felt more concern over long-term health impacts, that longtime residents tended to be less alarmed by the fire than newcomers, and that significant emotional stock was placed on gardens and farming livelihoods than on fear of contamination. A skepticism of the intentions of the Government of Ontario was also noted by the researchers. Importantly, research specifically into the impacts of the fire on local Indigenous communities was not conducted, leaving local news reports as the only written source of information as to the feelings of the Indigenous population.

==== Physical health ====
The complications of researching the impacts of human exposure to tire fires are numerous, and without specific studies from Hagersville itself the physical toll of the fire on nearby residents is hard to ascertain. That said, generalized consequences can be identified in the existing literature. What literature on the topic exists is in agreement that tire fire smoke is a respiratory hazard, capable of irritating skin, eyes, and throats with significant implications for people with asthma. A paper studying the impacts of a tire fire in Spain reported tentatively that "health risks associated to the exposure to carcinogenic substances were...3-5-times higher" for those immediately adjacent to the event compared to those further away from the site.

=== Reforms to tire management strategies in Canada ===
The Hagersville tire fire was a major news event in North America as it was occurring, and its legacy was invoked by several actors working to reform tire dumps in the province. Towards the end of the fire, major media outlets like the New York Times, the Globe and Mail, and ABC News were reporting on events in Hagersville. Hansard reports conversation in the legislature at Queen's Park on 8 March 1990, urging the government to address other tire dumps in the province. Debate surrounding the eventual adoption of the Ontario Tire Stewardship program in 2008 also made mention of the Hagersville tire fire, with its legacy cited in debates around the creation of a new tire recycling regime.

Outside of Ontario, the Hagersville tire fire also galvanized movement outside of the province to address tire dumping. A fire in St. Amable, Quebec (link in French) caused the CBC to dub 1990 "the year of the tire fire". In 1992, the Auditor General of New Brunswick cited the Hagersville tire fire as informing the province's decision to purchase tire shredding equipment to reduce risks associated with tire fires.
