= 2022 Beijing Sitong Bridge protest =

2022 protest in China

Beijing Sitong Bridge protest
- Part of the Chinese democracy movement and the 2022 COVID-19 protests in China
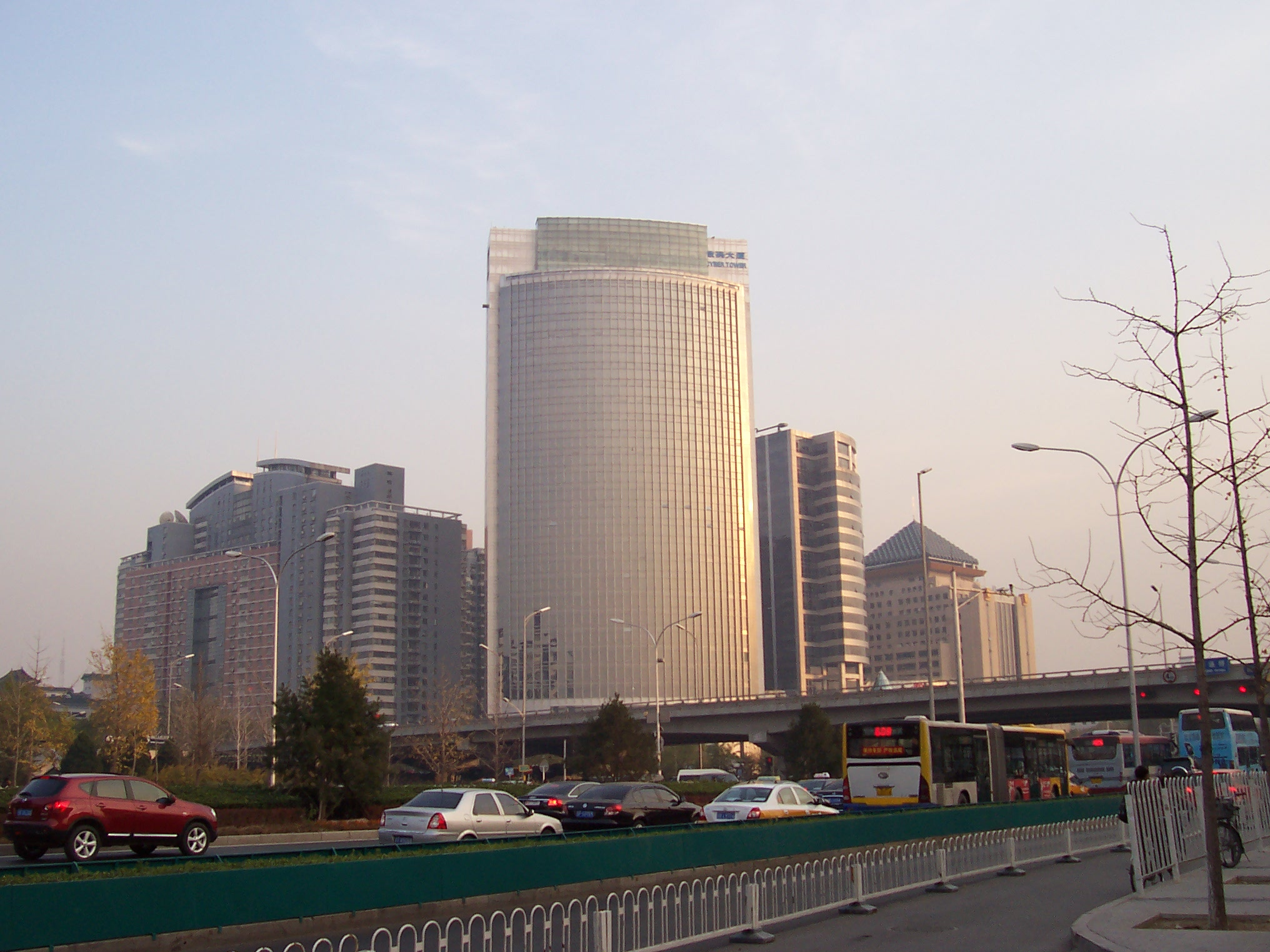
- Sitong Bridge pictured in 2012
- Date: October 13, 2022
- Location: Sitong Bridge, Haidian, Beijing, China; 39.96564°N 116.31517°E
- Caused by: Opposition to Xi Jinping and the Chinese government's zero-COVID policy
- Methods: Hanging banners, playing slogans on loudspeakers, burning tires to produce black smoke
- Result: Protester arrested, banners and loudspeakers removed

The Beijing Sitong Bridge protest was a protest that took place on October 13, 2022, in Haidian, Beijing, China.

The protest happened three days before the opening of the 20th National Congress of the Chinese Communist Party (CCP). On the morning of October 13, 2022, a protester demonstrated against CCP general secretary Xi Jinping's cult of personality, dictatorship, human rights violations, strengthening of censorship, seeking of leadership for life and implementation of the zero-COVID policy by hanging banners and burning tires on Sitong Bridge (Chinese: 四通桥; pinyin: Sìtōng Qiáo) in Haidian, Beijing.

The protester, Peng Lifa (彭立发; pinyin: Péng Lìfā; b. 1974), has been dubbed Bridge Man or Banner Man in reference to Tank Man.

== Background ==
Protests took place frequently in China in the 2000s, with 180,000 protests taking place in 2010 according to Tsinghua University sociology professor Sun Liping.

This protest against Xi Jinping and his policies was rare, as it came just days before the start of the CCP National Congress, a period during which the authorities imposed extremely tight control over protests and dissent. It was widely expected that Xi's rule for an unprecedented third term would be cemented at the Congress.

== Protest ==
We don't want nucleic acid testing, we want food to eat;
We don't want lockdowns, we want freedom;
We don't want lies, we want dignity;
We don't want Cultural Revolution, we want reform;
We don't want [dictatorial] leaders, we want elections;
We don't want to be slaves, we want to be citizens.

(不要核酸要吃饭 不要封控要自由 不要谎言要尊严
不要文革要改革 不要领袖要选票 不做奴才做公民)

— Content of the left banner

Go on strike at school and work, remove dictator and national traitor Xi Jinping!
Arise! Ye who refuse to be slaves! Oppose dictatorship. Oppose authoritarianism. Save China with one person one vote to elect the president!!!
(罢课罢工罢免独裁国贼习近平
起来不愿意做奴隶的人们！ 反独裁反专制救中国 一人一票选主席！！！)

— Content of the right banner

I want to eat. I want to be free. I want to vote.
Go on strike at school and work, remove the treasonous dictator Xi Jinping!
(要吃饭，要自由，要选票！
罢课，罢工，罢免独裁国贼习近平！)

— Content played by loudspeaker equipment

The protest was held on October 13, 2022, on Sitong Bridge by a lone protester. The protester, having disguised himself as a construction worker by wearing an orange vest and a yellow helmet, placed two banners on the bridge and set fire to tires to produce attention-drawing smoke. He then repeatedly chanted through a loudspeaker, "Go on strike at school and work, remove dictator and national traitor Xi Jinping! We want to eat, we want freedom, we want to vote!" He was soon arrested by security forces. Radio Free Asia reported in October 2023 that he was still alive, whereabouts "unclear," with his family under close surveillance.

Photos of the event spread rapidly on online social media.

Peng Lifa also published a 23-page detailed promotional document on ResearchGate, calling on the public to begin boycotting classes and work, as well as honking car horns and other activities, starting on October 16 (the opening day of the 20th National Congress, a Sunday).

Though The New York Times published an article on December 7, 2022, naming him "Peng Lifa", the protester's identity has not been confirmed. However, some believe him to be an academic physicist and have flooded a Twitter account assumed to be linked to the protester with messages of admiration. The Wall Street Journal and Radio Free Asia reported that some activists believed the protester to be Peng Lifa, also known as Peng Zaizhou, a 48-year-old physics enthusiast.

Protest banner themes included Xi Jinping's cult of personality, dictatorship and totalitarian rule, infringement of human rights, strengthening of censorship, Xi Jinping's reelection despite failure to observe term limits, the Cultural Revolution, the implementation of the "zero-COVID" policy, and overwork.

=== Gallery ===
External image
- The protest, showing the left banner and smoke from burning tires, from The New York Times

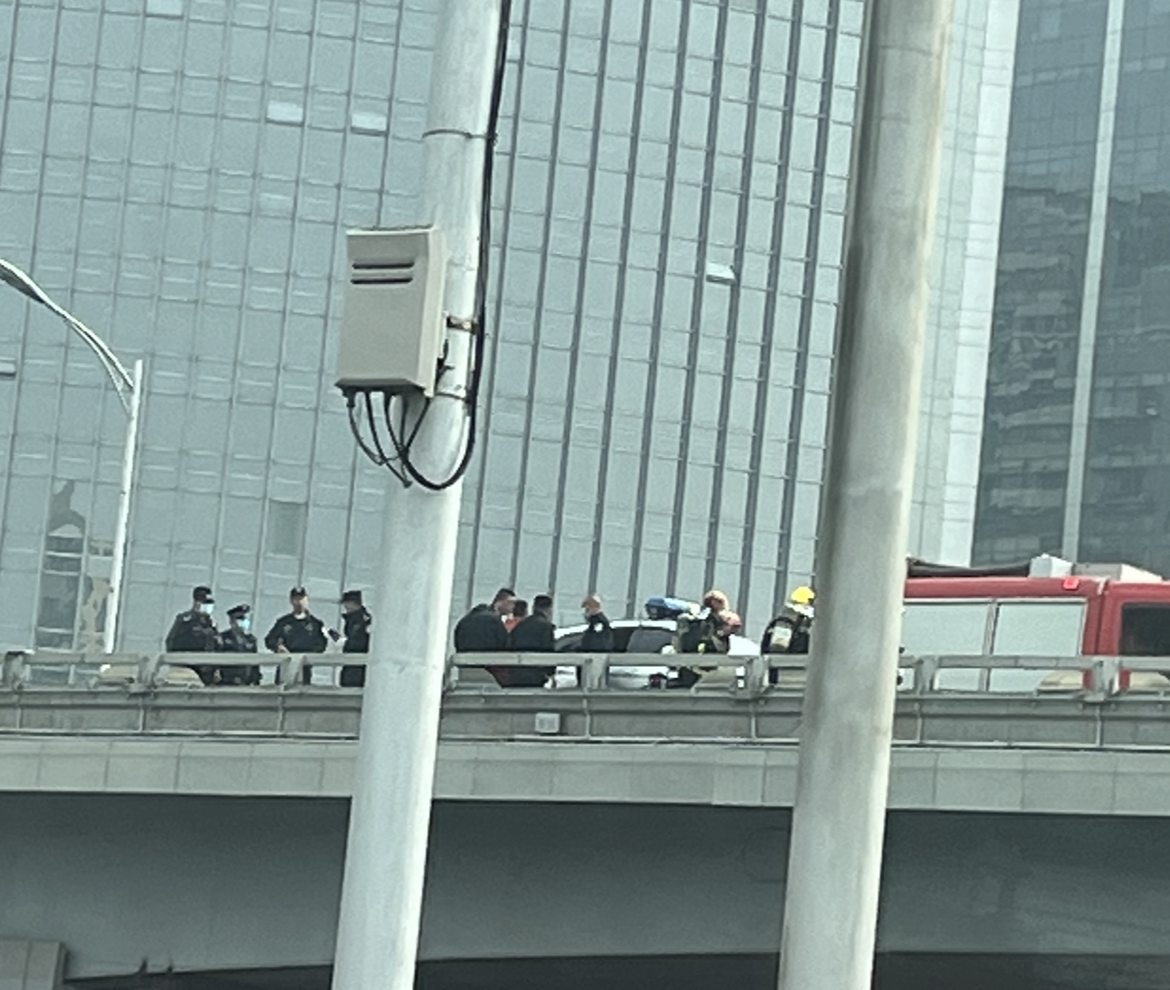
Police and firefighters arrive at the Sitong Bridge protest site

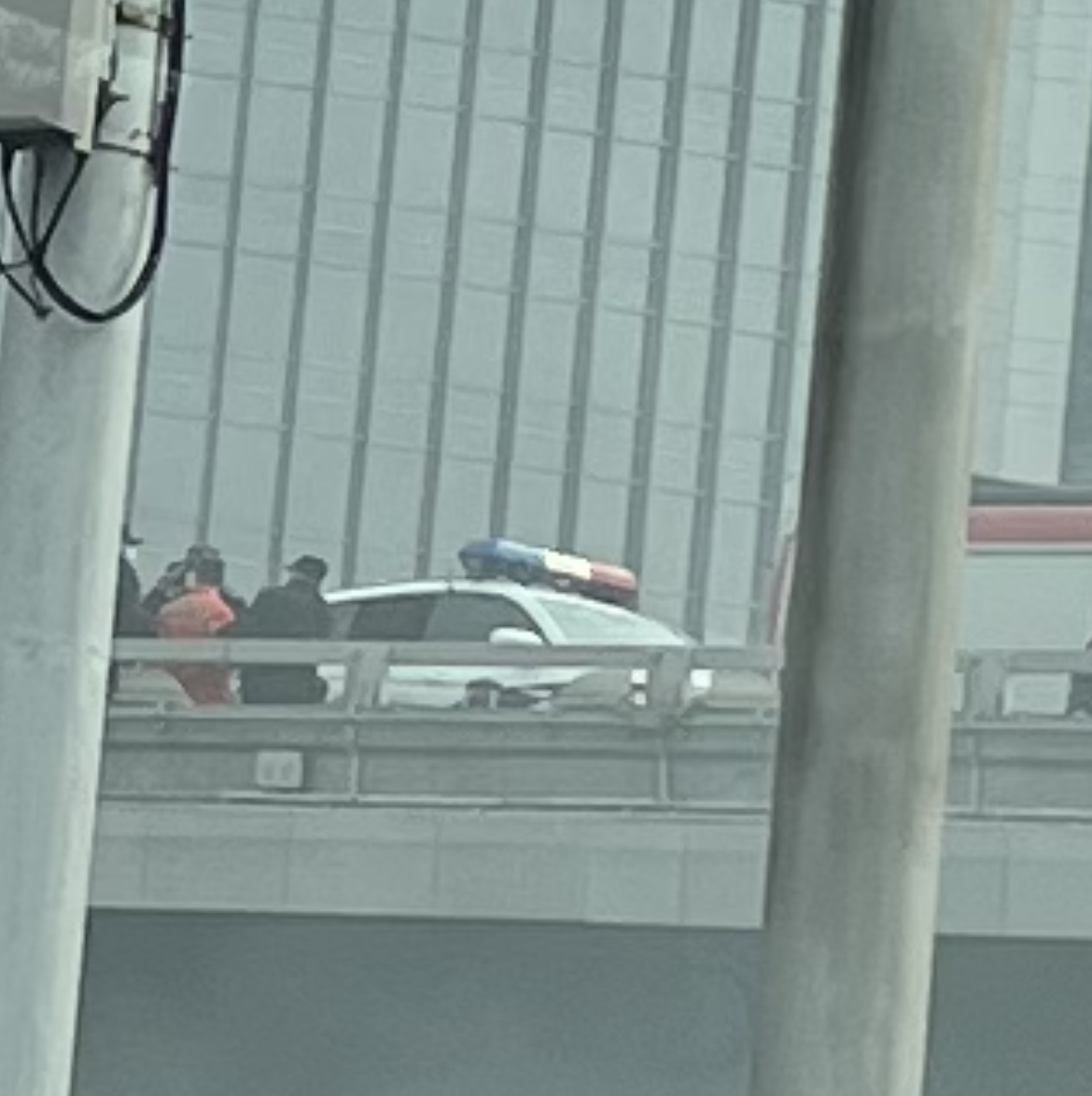
Sitong Bridge protester Peng Lifa being taken into a police car

== Reactions ==
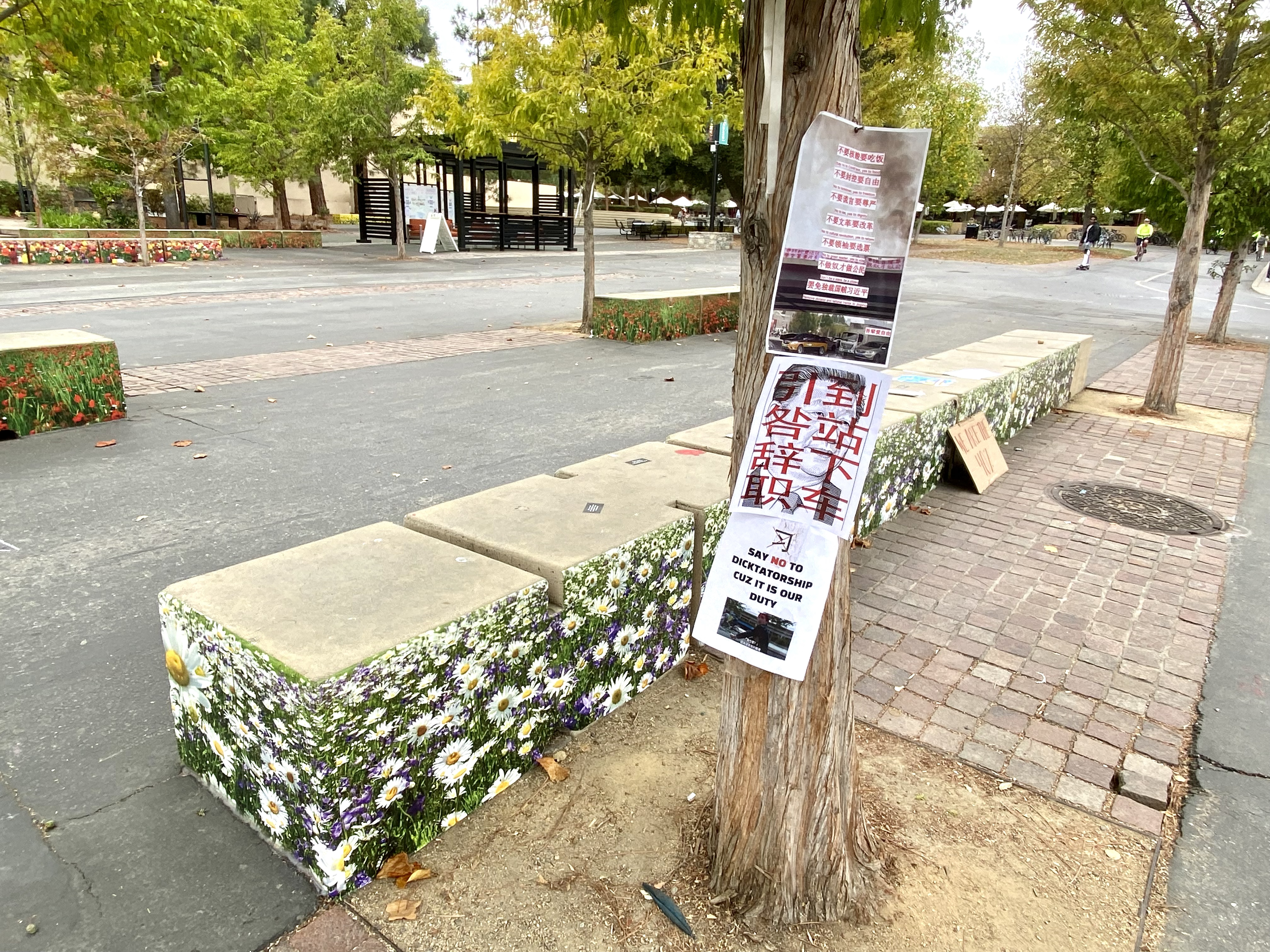
Anti Xi Jinping flyers in Stanford University in solidarity with the Sitong Bridge protest

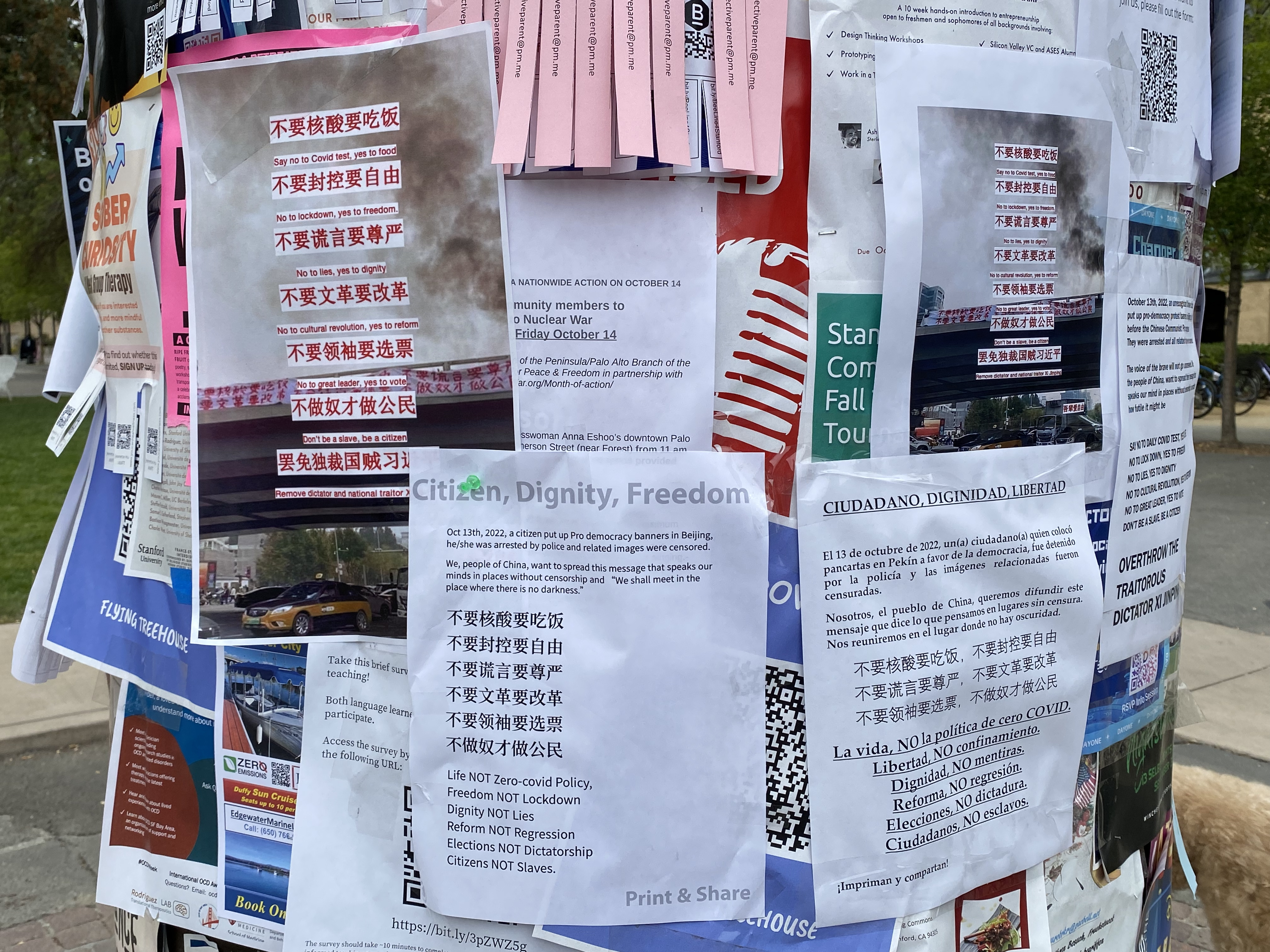
Anti Xi Jinping flyers in Stanford University in solidarity with the Sitong Bridge protest

Peng's act was described by BBC News as "one of the most significant acts of Chinese protest seen under Mr Xi's rule".

In response to the protest, numerous photos circulated in Twitter of posters showing solidarity with the protester and slogans denouncing Xi Jinping from campuses of numerous universities in the United States, United Kingdom, Canada, Netherlands and South Korea. Similar protest slogans subsequently appeared as graffiti in other cities in China and via AirDrop. Art celebrating his actions has also been shared online.

=== Censorship ===
Photographs and videos of the protest were censored by the Chinese internet censorship system. Some individuals who reposted video or images of the protest were also arrested. Chinese authorities censored terms which could lead people to the protest, including "Sitong Bridge" and "brave man", and Bloomberg News reported that words such as "courage", "bridge" and even "Beijing" were also censored.

The following month, Apple released an iOS update that prevents AirDrop from being enabled in "Everyone" mode for more than 10 minutes at a time for users in China (after which it reverts to a mode requiring the sender to be on the receiver's contacts list). Apple publicly stated that this was intended to help reduce unsolicited images, and that the feature would become available outside of China at a later date. It was suggested by Bloomberg News that the change was made at the request of the Chinese government.

Baidu Maps subsequently removed the location of the protest from its online maps.

== Later similar protests ==
The protest was assessed by media as having possibly inspired further similar protests in Shandong in February 2023, in Xinhua County in Loudi in July 2024, and at Chadianzi Bus Station in Chengdu in April 2025.

== See also ==
- Democracy movements in China
- 2022 COVID-19 protests in China
- 2025 Chongqing anti-CCP protest
