= Burnout =

Burnout, burn-out, or burn out may refer to:

== Fatigue-related uses ==
- Occupational burnout, characterized by exhaustion, cynicism, and reduced professional efficacy within the workplace
- Teacher burnout, occupational burnout in education
- Autistic burnout, a state of intense mental, emotional, or physical exhaustion experienced by some autistic people
- Physician burnout, a psychological syndrome arising from prolonged exposure to occupational stressors
- Caregiver burnout, occupational burnout in the context of unpaid caregiving
- Overtraining syndrome, also called burnout among athletes

== Entertainment ==
- Burnout (film), a 2017 Moroccan film
- Burn Out (film), a 2017 French film
- Burnout (ride), a Funfields amusement ride in Australia
- Burnout (series), a racing game series created by UK company Criterion Games, with a notable emphasis on dangerous driving and crashes
  - Burnout (video game), the first game of the same series
- Burnout: Championship Drag Racing, a 1998 video game
- "Burn Out" (CSI), an episode from the seventh season of the television series CSI: Crime Scene Investigation
- Burn Out (G.I. Joe), a fictional character in the G.I. Joe universe, member of the Dreadnoks
- Burnout, the third episode of the Influencer Arc, a spin-off miniseries based on Animator vs. Animation

=== Music ===
==== Albums ====
- Burn Out (album), a 1998 album by Christian pop punk band Slick Shoes
- Burnout (Ox album), a 2009 album by Canadian band Ox
- Burnout (Anarbor album), 2013 album by alternative rock band Anarbor
- Burnout (album), 2024 album by BoyWithUke
- Burnout (EP), 2024 album by American indie rock band Vial

==== Songs ====
- "Burn Out" (Sipho Mabuse song), 1983
- "Burnout", a song by Green Day from Dookie, 1994
- "Burn Out", a song by TGT from Three Kings, 2013
- "Burnout", a song by Beartooth from Aggressive, 2016
- "Burn Out", a song by Imagine Dragons from Origins, 2018
- "Burn Out" (Midland song), 2017
- "Burn Out" (Martin Garrix and Justin Mylo song), 2018
- "Burnout" (10 Years song), 2018
- "Burn Out", a song by Anson Lo, 2020

== Other uses ==
- Burnout (clothing), devoré, a fabric technique particularly used on velvets
- Burnout (vehicle), when a vehicle's tires are spun so they produce smoke

== See also ==
- Burned Out (disambiguation)
