= Peng Lifa =

Chinese activist

- 彭立发
- Born: January 7, 1974 (age 52); Heilongjiang, China
- Disappeared: October 13, 2022; Haidian, Beijing, China
- Status: Missing for 4 years and 23 days
- Other name: Peng Zaizhou (online name)
- Occupation: Activist
- Known for: Beijing Sitong Bridge protest
- Spouse: Han Yang
- Children: 2
- Honours: named one of the 100 most influential people in the world by Time magazine in 2023

Peng Lifa (Chinese: 彭立发; pinyin: Péng Lìfā; born January 7, 1974) is a Chinese democracy activist who initiated the Beijing Sitong Bridge protest in October 2022 before the 20th National Congress of the Chinese Communist Party. He was named one of the 100 most influential people in the world by Time magazine in 2023.

== Career and activism ==
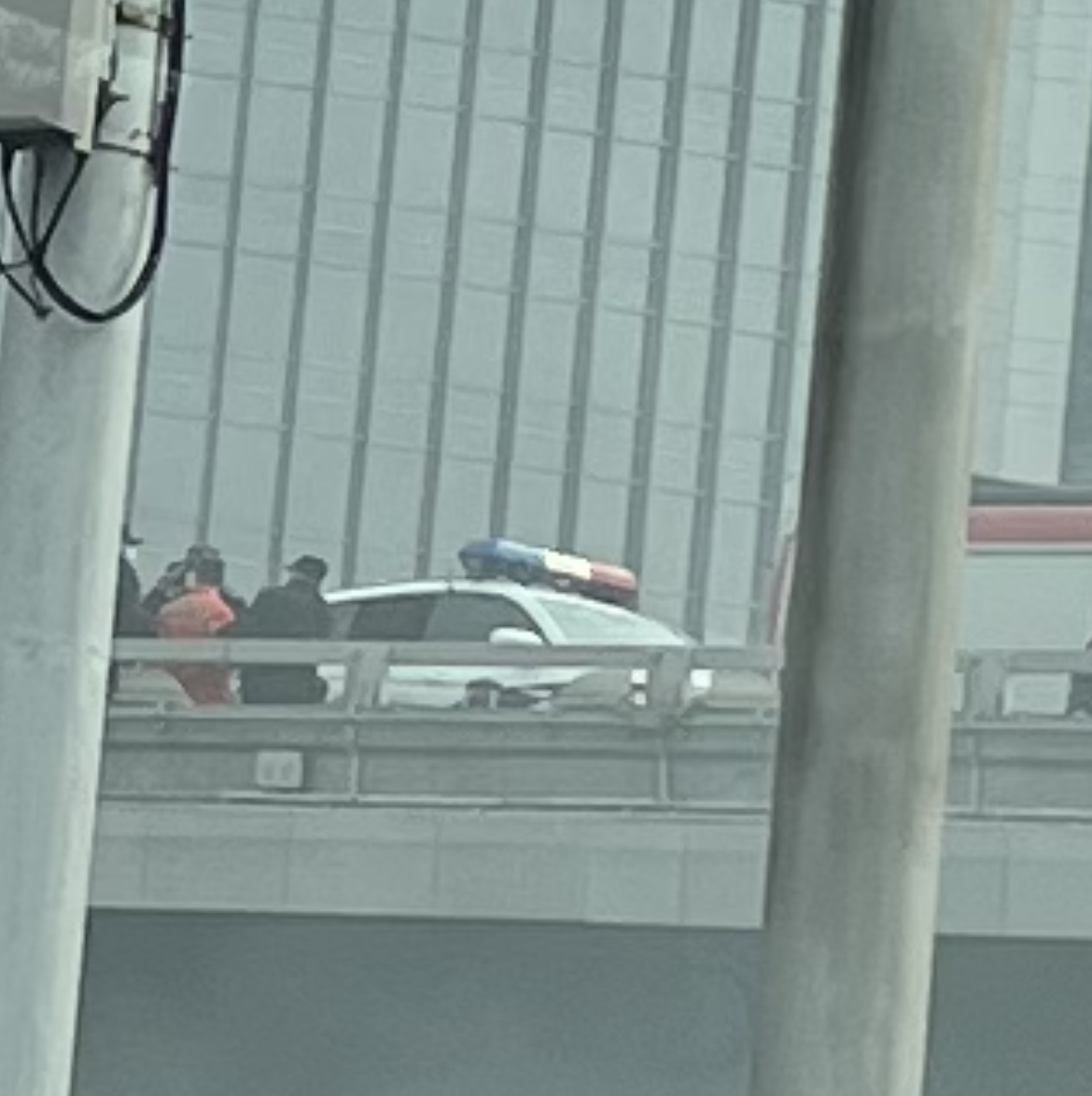
Peng (dressed in orange) was brought into a police vehicle, on Sitong Bridge.

Peng worked for an acrylic products firm called Beijing Melon Network Technology Co., Ltd. He wrote articles on electromagnetism.

On October 13, 2022, Peng initiated the Beijing Sitong Bridge protest by posting a banner on the Sitong Bridge. Peng draped protest banners from Beijing's Sitong Bridge. They unfurled to reveal exhortations against China's zero-COVID policy, calling it a violation of freedom of expression and demanding real elections and political reform.

Peng further challenged General Secretary of the Chinese Communist Party Xi Jinping on October 13, 2022, by shouting through a loudspeaker, "We want to eat. We want freedom. We want votes!." He is suspected to have been detained by the police. His slogans spread across the country with comparisons being made between Peng and the Tank Man. His act was described by BBC News as "one of the most significant acts of Chinese protest seen under Xi's rule."

Though the New York Times published an article on December 7, 2022, naming him "Peng Lifa," the protester's identity has not been confirmed. However, some believe him to be an academic physicist and have flooded a Twitter account assumed to be linked to the protester with messages of admiration. The Wall Street Journal and Radio Free Asia reported that some activists believed the protester to be Peng Lifa, also known as Peng Zaizhou, a 48-year-old physics enthusiast.

In April 2023, Peng was named to the Time 100 list of the most influential people in the world for his pro-democracy activism.

== Fate ==
As of October 2023, according to sources familiar with the case cited by VOA, Peng Lifa remained in detention at a location described as unknown.

Peng Lifa's family continues to face significant government scrutiny and control. His close family members are under constant surveillance and have not been provided with any legal documents related to his case. Despite efforts, his relatives and friends have been unable to hire a lawyer to provide him with legal assistance.

Peng Lifa's wife and daughters are under strict government surveillance, with their every move accompanied by government personnel. Their daily commutes to work and school are arranged by the authorities, and their personal cell phones have been confiscated — ostensibly for "protection" — and replaced with government-issued phones. Peng's siblings have been summoned to the local police station for questioning. His father-in-law, previously a small business owner, has been reassigned by the Public Security Bureau to work and live in a small factory, where he remains under surveillance. His mother-in-law is also believed to be under surveillance. In addition, his two sisters-in-law, the husband of one of them, and his brother-in-law have been questioned at their workplaces.

== Personal life ==
Peng was born in 1974 in Heilongjiang. As of October 2023, his wife and two daughters, both of whom have been described as minors, all reside in Beijing. His brothers and sisters are farmers in Tailai, Heilongjiang Province, and his parents have both died due to illness.

== See also ==
- List of Chinese pro-democracy activists
