= Zhonghe =

Zhonghe is the name of several places in mainland China and Taiwan. It may refer to:

== Zhonghe (中和) ==
- Zhonghe Festival, a traditional Chinese festival
- Zhonghe District, district of New Taipei City, Taiwan
- Zhonghe line, a metro branch line of Zhonghe-Xinlu Line, Taipei Metro
- Zhonghe Subdistrict (中和街道), Shuangliu District, Sichuan
- Towns named Zhonghe (中和镇)
  - Zhonghe, Chongqing, in Kaizhou District, Chongqing
  - Zhonghe, Xiuyan County, in Xiushan Tujia and Miao Autonomous County, Chongqing
  - Zhonghe, Danzhou, in Binhai District, Danzhou, Hainan
  - Zhonghe, Qinggang County, in Qinggang County, Heilongjiang
  - Zhonghe, Yanshou County, in Yanshou County, Heilongjiang
  - Zhonghe, Huojia County, in Huojia County, Henan
  - Zhonghe, Liuyang, Hunan
  - Zhonghe, Ningyuan County, in Ningyuan County, Hunan
  - Zhonghe, Meihekou, in Meihekou, Jilin
  - Zhonghe, Sandu County, in Sandu Sui Autonomous County, Guizhou
  - Zhonghe, Yuechi County, in Yuechi County, Sichuan
  - Zhonghe, Ziyang, in Ziyang, Sichuan
- Zhonghe Township (中和乡)
  - Zhonghe Township, Nanning, in Yongning District, Nanning, Guangxi
  - Zhonghe Township, Dazhu County, in Dazhu County, Dazhou, Sichuan

== Zhonghe (忠和) ==
- Zhonghe, Gaolan County (忠和镇), in Gaolan County, Lanzhou
