= Death of Hu Yaobang =

1989 death of a Chinese politician

On April 8, 1989, Hu Yaobang, the former General Secretary of the Chinese Communist Party (CCP), was hospitalized in Beijing due to a sudden heart attack. He died at 7:53 a.m. on April 15 at the age of 73. He was officially commemorated in accordance with the standards for the national leaders of the People's Republic of China, but his death also served as a catalyst for the 1989 Tiananmen Square student protests and subsequent massacre.

== Background ==
During the Spring Festival of 1989, Hu left Beijing for a vacation in Hunan. There, he developed a common cold that led to cardiovascular disease. After emergency treatment, his condition stabilized, and he was later moved to Guangxi for rest.

In early March, Hu, part of the Politburo of the Chinese Communist Party, returned to Beijing after attending the National People's Congress where he appeared noticeably thinner in public.

== Heart attack ==
On the morning of April 8, around 10:00 a.m., General Secretary Zhao Ziyang chaired an expanded meeting of the Political Bureau at the Huairen Hall in Zhongnanhai.

During the discussion on the draft of the "Decision on Education Issues by the Central Committee", Hu suddenly suffered a heart attack and raised his hand to request a break. Zhao advised Hu to stabilize himself and immediately instructed the General Office of the Chinese Communist Party to find a doctor. Jiang Zemin, Shanghai Municipal Committee of the Chinese Communist Party, took out two pills, though it remains unclear if they were actually used.

Soon after, Dr. Qian Yijian and Dr. Wang Minqing from Beijing Hospital arrived and diagnosed Hu with a myocardial infarction. By 2:00 p.m., Hu was transported to Beijing Hospital. Although he had passed the critical phase, his condition remained stable.

On the morning of April 15, he woke up, defecated, ate watermelon, and asked the staff about "the situation outside." He was in pain and could not speak. A large area of blood vessels in his left chest ruptured, causing a large area of myocardial infarction. He died at 7:53 a.m. on that day.

== Funeral ==
After Hu's death, because he had served as chairman and General Secretary, the funeral was held in accordance with the standards for the national leaders of the People's Republic of China (The actual standards were higher than those of Ye Jianying, of the Standing Committee of the National People's Congress, who had served as the head of state).

On April 22, Hu's memorial service was held in the Great Hall of the People. On the road stretching from Tiananmen Square to Babaoshan, people stood in silence on both sides. President Yang Shangkun presided over the memorial service. Zhao delivered a eulogy. Chairman of the Central Military Commission Deng Xiaoping and other party and state leaders, as well as thousands of people from all walks of life, attended the memorial service. The official obituary stated:

Comrade Hu Yaobang was a time-tested and loyal communist fighter, a great proletarian revolutionary and statesman, an outstanding political worker in our army, and an outstanding leader who held important leadership positions in the Party for a long time.

According to a request made from Hu Yaobang's wife Li Zhao to the CCP Central Committee, Hu Yaobang's ashes were transported from Beijing and buried in Gongqingcheng in Jiangxi—which he had founded during his lifetime—on December 15, 1990. Accompanied by Wen Jiabao, then-Director of the General Office of the CCP Central Committee, Hu's eldest son Hu Deping respectfully held his father's ashes and buried them in Fuhuashan Cemetery.

== Tiananmen Square ==
Civilian commemorations began almost immediately after the news of Hu Yaobang's death was made public, initially starting in universities in Beijing but gradually turning into a student movement until it was violently repressed by the military on June 4. Hu's sudden death ended up creating a strong echo among students and became the initial impetus for the people of the capital to gather.

Posters praising Hu appeared on university campuses in the days thereafter, calling on the CCP's Central Committee to re-examine Hu's views. A few days later, these calls expanded to include issues such as press freedom, democratic system and official corruption. In Shanghai, thousands of students from Fudan University and Tongji University gathered at the city government, and in Nanjing, 10,000 students mourned at Drum Tower Square, but activities soon ended peacefully.

On the campuses of major universities in Beijing, various big-character posters appeared, using the mourning of Hu to criticize the "gerontocracy" that forced Hu to step down in 1987. A small-scale spontaneous rally took place near the Monument to the People's Heroes in Tiananmen Square to mourn Hu. Based on sympathy for Hu's experience, as well as respect for his open and honest image, in addition to dissatisfaction with the serious corruption and bribery caused by the reform and opening up, young students at the time came out to mourn Hu. Such sentiments eventually led to the subsequent joint student and civil movement and the Tiananmen Square incident in 1989.

At 8:00 a.m. on April 17, the State Council sent an official to meet with student representatives Guo Haifeng and Wang Dan. During this time, the number of people expressing support continued to increase. By 9:00 p.m., about 20,000 students gathered at Tiananmen Square. On that day, more than 700 big-character posters about Hu appeared in several universities in Beijing, during which police and the public confronted each other at Xinhua Gate.

As protests progressed through April, the People's Daily published an editorial titled "How We Mourn Comrade Yaobang" which stated that incidents which undermined stability and unity were absolutely not allowed. On April 26, the People's Daily published an editorial titled "April 26 Editorial" on the front page, characterizing the student movement as turmoil. The student organizations responded by starting strikes and hunger strikes. The conflict between the two sides gradually intensified, eventually leading to the authorities using the military to expel the students from Tiananmen Square on June 4.

== Official commemoration ==
On the eve of the June 4 Tiananmen Incident, the government held various levels of mourning activities, including a high-level memorial service held in the Great Hall of the People with the participation of Deng and other leaders. Since Hu had served as the Leader of the Chinese Communist Party as Party Chairman and General Secretary, the memorial service was half a level higher than when Ye died.

In the years after June 4, the Chinese government gradually lowered the level of commemoration activities for Hu until 2005, when the then-General Secretary of the CCP Hu Jintao proposed that a higher level of commemoration be held such as the symposiums and leaders' articles in 2005 and 2010.

=== 2005 ===
On November 18, 2005, the CCP Central Committee held the Symposium to Commemorate the 90th Anniversary of the Birth of Comrade Hu Yaobang at the Great Hall of the People. This was the first high-level official commemoration of Hu after the Tiananmen Square incident. According to Xinhua News Agency:

Member of the Standing Committee of the Political Bureau of the CCP Central Committee and Premier of the State Council Wen Jiabao attended the symposium. Member of the Standing Committee of the Political Bureau of the CCP Central Committee and Vice President Zeng Qinghong delivered an important speech at the meeting. The symposium was chaired by Wu Guanzheng, member of the Standing Committee of the Political Bureau of the CCP Central Committee and Secretary of the Central Commission for Discipline Inspection.

In his speech, Zeng Qinghong highly praised Hu Yaobang's life. The beginning of his second paragraph repeated the original words of the evaluation in the CCP Central Committee's obituary: "Comrade Hu Yaobang devoted his entire life to the cause of the Party and the people. As a Marxist, his life was glorious."

At the same time, Hu Yaobang's former residence in Liuyang, Hunan was restored to its original appearance. The new Hu Yaobang Life and Achievements Exhibition Hall, located opposite the former residence, was also under intense construction and due to open on November 20.

In addition, the first volume of Hu Yaobang's biography was released on November 25. The first print run had hundreds of thousands of copies. The related Endless Missing - Recalling Father Hu Yaobang had an initial print run of 200,000 copies.The previously banned Yanhuang Chunqiu November 2005 issue were also released for publication. On December 7, China Youth Daily's Freezing Point published Hu Qili's article "Yaobang in my heart" which was the first article in the newspaper's 16 years to commemorate Hu.

=== 2010–2015 ===
On April 15, 2010, Wen—then a member of the Standing Committee of the Political Bureau of the CCP Central Committee and Premier of the State Council—published a signed article titled "Returning to Xingyi to Remember Hu Yaobang" in the People's Daily on the 21st anniversary of Hu's death. Wen, who had worked with Hu for nearly two years, said in the article:

I personally experienced Comrade Yaobang's excellent style of keeping close contact with the masses and caring about their sufferings, as well as his selfless and upright character. I witnessed with my own eyes how he devoted himself to his work day and night for the cause of the Party and the interests of the people. I have kept his earnest teachings in mind, and his words and deeds have made me dare not slack off.

The article echoed Zeng Qinghong's speech at the symposium commemorating the 90th anniversary of Hu's birth in 2005, emphasizing his selfless work, courage to reform, love for the people, and down-to-earth style of focusing on investigation and research. It also reflected the encouragement and hope of the CCP's top leaders for cadres at all levels in the context of complex social contradictions.

On January 6, 2013, a bronze statue of Hu was placed on Dachen Island in Taizhou, Zhejiang to commemorate the land reclamation activities which he had called for and led in 1956. Later, on April 15, the anniversary of Hu's death, official media in mainland China, including the Liberation Daily and the People's Daily, published articles mourning Hu, marking the first time such mourning appeared since General Secretary Xi Jinping and other new CCP Central Committee leaders came to power.

On April 11, 2014, Hu Jintao, the former General Secretary of the CCP who had stepped down for more than a year, visited Hu's former residence in Zhonghe Town, Liuyang, Hunan. He was accompanied by Xu Shousheng, Secretary of the Hunan Provincial Committee of the Chinese Communist Party, and other officials. Hu Jintao stayed there for an hour and bowed to the bronze statue of Hu. Such an event was strictly blocked in mainland China. Hu's son Hu Dehua said in an interview with Taiwanese media that Hu Jintao was just a civilian after he stepped down, and his visit to Hu's former residence had just been a personal act and therefore did not represent the official position of the Chinese government.

In November 2015, the CCP Central Committee arranged commemorative activities for the hundredth anniversary of the birth of Comrade Hu Yaobang. Xi and national leaders of the People's Republic of China personally attended the commemorative meeting on the 20th; Xi delivered a speech.

== See also ==
- Hu Yaobang's Former Residence
- Hu Yaobang's Tomb
- 1976 Tiananmen incident
