= Shidong =

Shidong may refer to the following places in China:

- Shidong Subdistrict (石洞街道), subdistrict of Longmatan District, Luzhou, Sichuan
- Shidong, Huaiji County (诗洞镇), a town in Guangdong
- Shidong, Gaolan County (石洞镇), a town in Gansu
