= China Biodiversity Conservation and Green Development Foundation =

Chinese environmental organization

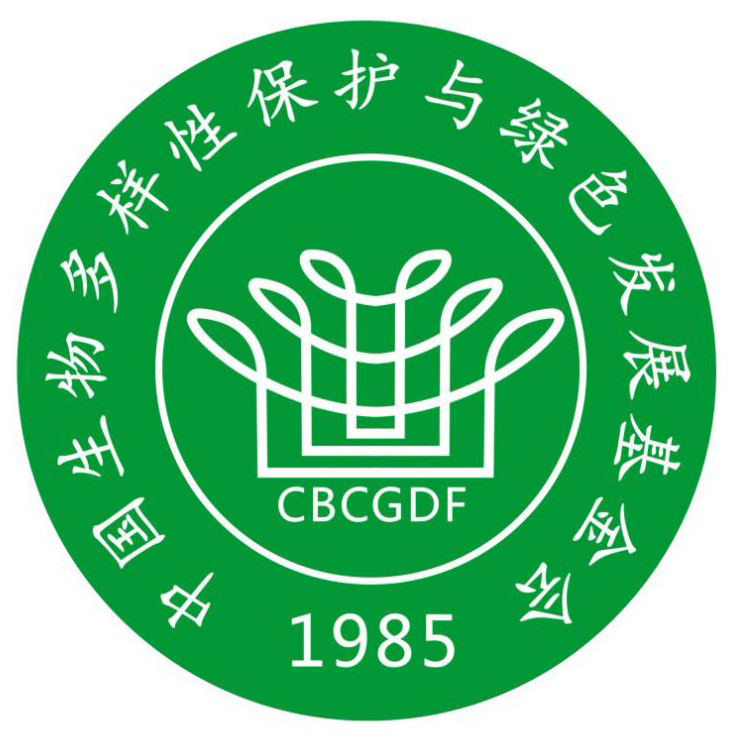
- Formation: 1985; 41 years ago
- Founders: Lu Zhengcao, Qian Changzhao, and Burhan Shahidi
- Purpose: Environmental protection, biodiversity conservation, sustainable development
- Headquarters: Haidian, Beijing, China
- Official language: Chinese
- Key people: Hu Deping (President), Zhou Jinfeng (Secretary General)
- Affiliations: China Association for Science and Technology
- Website: www.cbcgdf.org
- Formerly called: China Milu Foundation

China Biodiversity Conservation and Green Development Foundation
- Traditional Chinese: 中國生物多樣性保護與綠色發展基金會
- Simplified Chinese: 中国生物多样性保护与绿色发展基金会
Transcriptions
Standard Mandarin
- Hanyu Pinyin: Zhōngguó Shēngwù Duōyàngxìng Bǎohù Yǔ Lǜsè Fāzhǎn Jījīnhuì

Alternative Chinese name
- Traditional Chinese: 中國綠發會
- Simplified Chinese: 中国绿发会
Transcriptions
Standard Mandarin
- Hanyu Pinyin: Zhōngguó Lǜ Fā Huì

The China Biodiversity Conservation and Green Development Foundation (CBCGDF) is a Chinese state-backed environmental organization that works to protect the environment, and preserve natural resources and biodiversity in China. It was established in 1985 as the China Milu Foundation and is registered by the China Association for Science and Technology and the Ministry of Civil Affairs.

== History ==
The foundation was founded in 1985 by Lü Zhengcao, Qian Changzhao and Burhan Shahidi, the former vice-chairman of the Chinese People's Political Consultative Conference (CPPCC) National Committee, to support the breeding and popularization of endangered Père David's deer species which was reintroduced back to China at that time. And it has worked since then on a number of resource management, environmental protection and conservation projects across China. Hu Deping is the current chairman of the foundation and Zhou Jinfeng, former deputy head of the Chinese Communist Party's United Front Work Department, is its secretary general.

== Approach ==
The foundation is involved in conservation efforts in a number of ways. It engages in lobbying the conservation work to community level through its Community conservation Areas (also called CCAfa) which it established in the April 2016 having till date over 100 CCAfas in China, yet in some cases criticized as non-official. It has a number of educational initiatives to raise awareness of Environmental issues in China and to encourage sustainable practices. It works with schools and with a large network of wildlife volunteers through local initiatives in target areas to ensure safe flyways for migratory birds. The NGO labels itself as grassroots-based, and the working system sometimes bring troubles to the Beijing-based NGO.

Its scientific staff is engaged in research and management plans in reserve wildlife habitat across the country. It also advises industry and government bodies on sustainable development and environmental impacts for their projects in several cities in China.

== Species conservation ==
Endangered species the foundation focuses on include pangolin, great bustard, Yangtze River dolphin, bluefin tuna, acer pentaphyllum, etc. It is reported that the fierce battle between the foundation and the Guangxi Forestry Department opened a new reform for China's wildlife rescue system.

== Environmental public interest litigation ==
On the path of safeguarding public interests, since the revision of China's new Environmental Protection Law (2015) giving non-governmental organizations the right to sue polluters on behalf of the public, the foundation has lawsuits against polluters and habitat destroyers causing harm to the environment and the people and wildlife living around it. Famous cases include the lawsuit against Tengger Desert Pollution, the litigation against oil giants ConocoPhillips and CNOOC over Bohai Bay oil spill, and to protect old red willows from a hydropower project, on old date trees, to safeguard cultural and historic relics, to protect Giant Panda, on poisonous school running tracks, and the failed Changzhou School case, etc.

== Cultural field ==
The Foundation also promotes eco-tourism and faith-based conservation with the goal of expanding awareness of the countries natural resources and also creating economic incentives for a continued and expanded preservation.

== Partnerships ==
The CBCGDF has partnerships and international collaborations with a number of international environmental groups such World Wildlife Fund (WWF), United Nations Environment Programme (UNEP), United Nations Development Programme (UNDP), the Convention on Biological Diversity (CBD), the Convention on Migratory Species (CMS), CITES and the International Union for Conservation of Nature. In 2016, it signed a partnership agreement with the CMS making it the first Chinese organization to be partners with the CMS and in the process it also establish an initiative called the Ecological Belt and Road Initiative.
