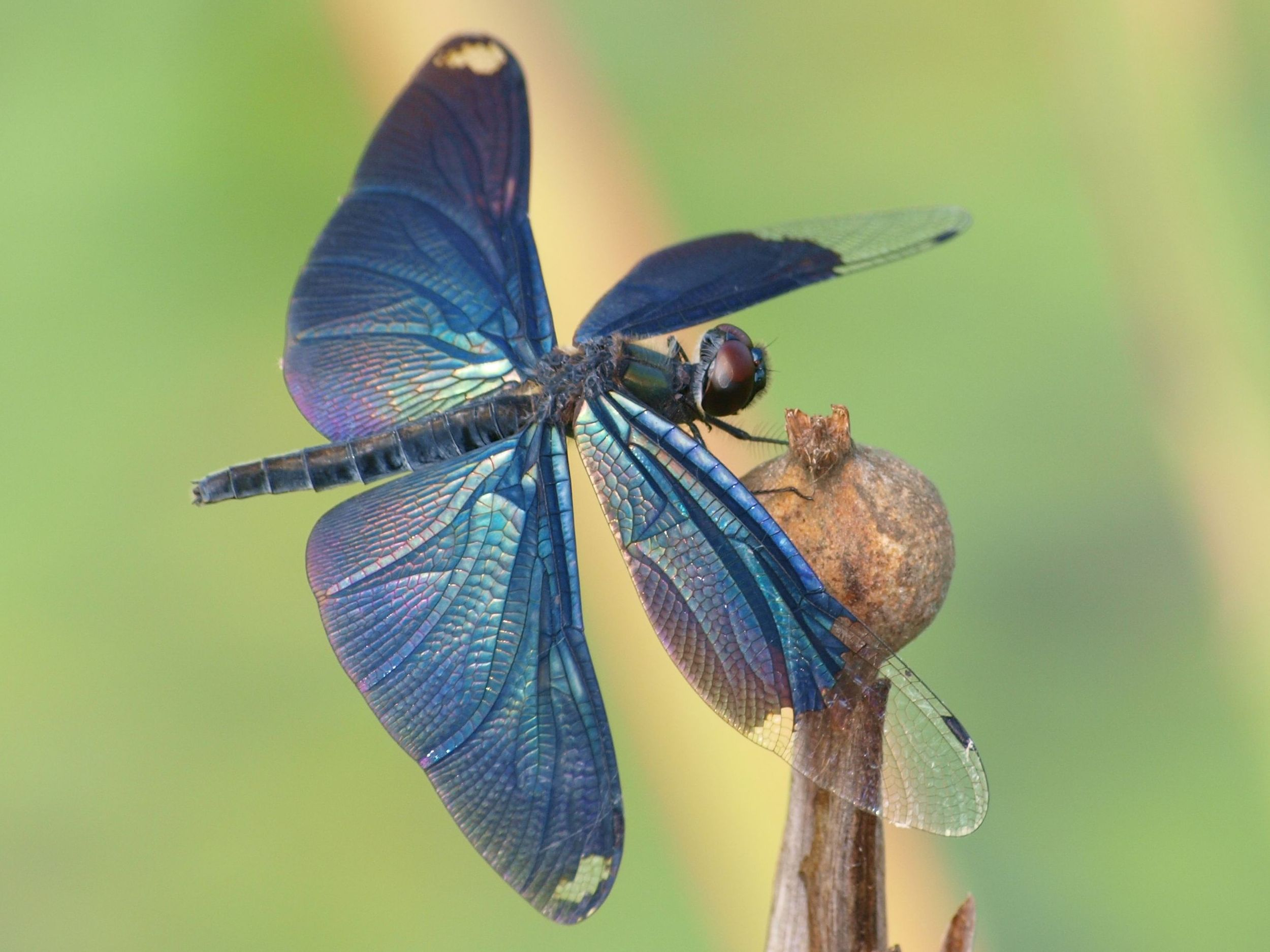
- Male

Conservation status
- Least Concern (IUCN 3.1)

Scientific classification
- Kingdom: Animalia
- Phylum: Arthropoda
- Class: Insecta
- Order: Odonata
- Infraorder: Anisoptera
- Family: Libellulidae
- Genus: Rhyothemis
- Species: R. fuliginosa

Binomial name
- Rhyothemis fuliginosa Selys, 1883

Synonyms
- Rhyothemis noshime Asahina, 1982

= Rhyothemis fuliginosa =

Butterfly dragonfly

Species of dragonfly

Rhyothemis fuliginosa, also known as the butterfly dragonfly or the butterfly flutterer, is a species of dragonfly of the family Libellulidae found throughout East Asia, in the countries of Japan, China, Taiwan, and the Korean Peninsula.

In Japan, R. fuliginosa is known as チョウトンボ (chou-tonbo, 蝶蜻蛉) which directly translates to "butterfly dragonfly." In China and Taiwan, it is known as 黑翅蜻蜓 (Hēi chì qīngtíng), meaning "black-winged dragonfly." In Korea it is also known as 나비잠자리 (Nabi jamjari) meaning "butterfly dragonfly".

Flights occur between the months of June and September. They are most active from early summer to the mid-autumn season.

== Description ==
Rhyothemis fuliginosa is a short and stout dragonfly with a body length of 32-41 millimeters in length. The wings are 30–40 mm across and patterned with a deep blue iridescent shade. Depending on the viewing angle, the dragonfly's wings can vary in color due to their light scattering properties, with some appearing golden in the light. The wing patterns are thought to be a determinant between members of the same species to avoid mating with the incorrect partner.

Males have spots on the tips of their hindwings, a feature that allows differentiation between male and female individuals. Southern Japanese specimens of R. fuliginosa feature spotted forewings and entirely pigmented hindwings.

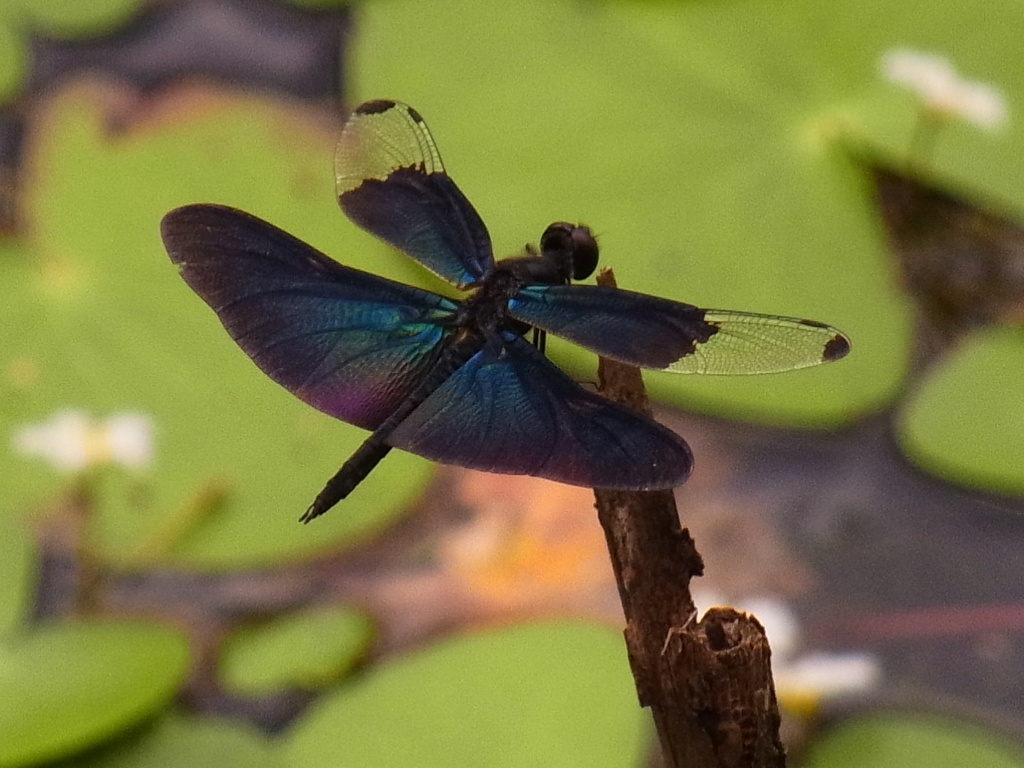
Southern Japanese variant.

== Range ==
Rhyothemis fuliginosa is found throughout East Asia, being known to have been spotted in China, Japan, Taiwan, and the Korean Peninsula. It has been known to extend its range further south into Vietnam as well.

In Japan the dragonfly is found throughout the main island of Honshu from as far north as Aomori Prefecture and can be found further south into the island of Kyushu's Kagoshima Prefecture. Overall, R. fuliginosa is found throughout the islands of Honshu, Shikoku, and Kyushu. There have been reports of sightings further north into Hokkaido as well. Its range further extends onto the offshore islands off the Japanese mainland, such as Tanegashima.

In Mainland China, R. fuliginosa is found in: Guangdong, Hebei, Henan, Hunan, Jiangsu, Jiangxi, Shaanxi, Shandong, Shichuan, and Zhejiang provinces. There are unconfirmed sightings in Hainan province as well.

It is a rare vagrant in Taiwan, with the first sighting of R. fuliginosa being recorded in 2007. Four other members of the genus Rhyothemis are found throughout the island in its absence, Rhyothemis regia, Rhyothemis severini, Rhyothemis triangularis, and Rhyothemis variegata.

== Habitat ==
The butterfly flutterer prefers inland freshwater wetlands, with a particular interest in wetland regions with aquatic plants. Habitats include: marshes, swamps, permanent freshwater lakes, permanent freshwater marshes, artificial ponds, and aquaculture ponds. Flights have been seen to occur in plains, mountainous areas, hills, and satoyama watersides. Because of their flight capabilities, R. fuliginosa adults tend to be able to venture further outside of their wetland habitats. During the evenings, adults venture into the forests to rest in the canopy.

== Ecology ==
Rhyothemis fuliginosa feeds on flying insects, with mosquitoes being favored as prey.

Mating is short, and egg laying occurs almost immediately following mating. Eggs are deposited by the female on the surface of freshwater bodies. R. fuliginosa overwinters as a larva, feeding on small insects.

It has been previously known to exhibit swarming behavior, however as a result of habitat depletion and pollution with insecticide use, there has been significant population decline within Japan. Increasing urbanization has resulted visible population decline, with the butterfly flutterer becoming less and less abundant within metropolitan areas.

== Etymology ==
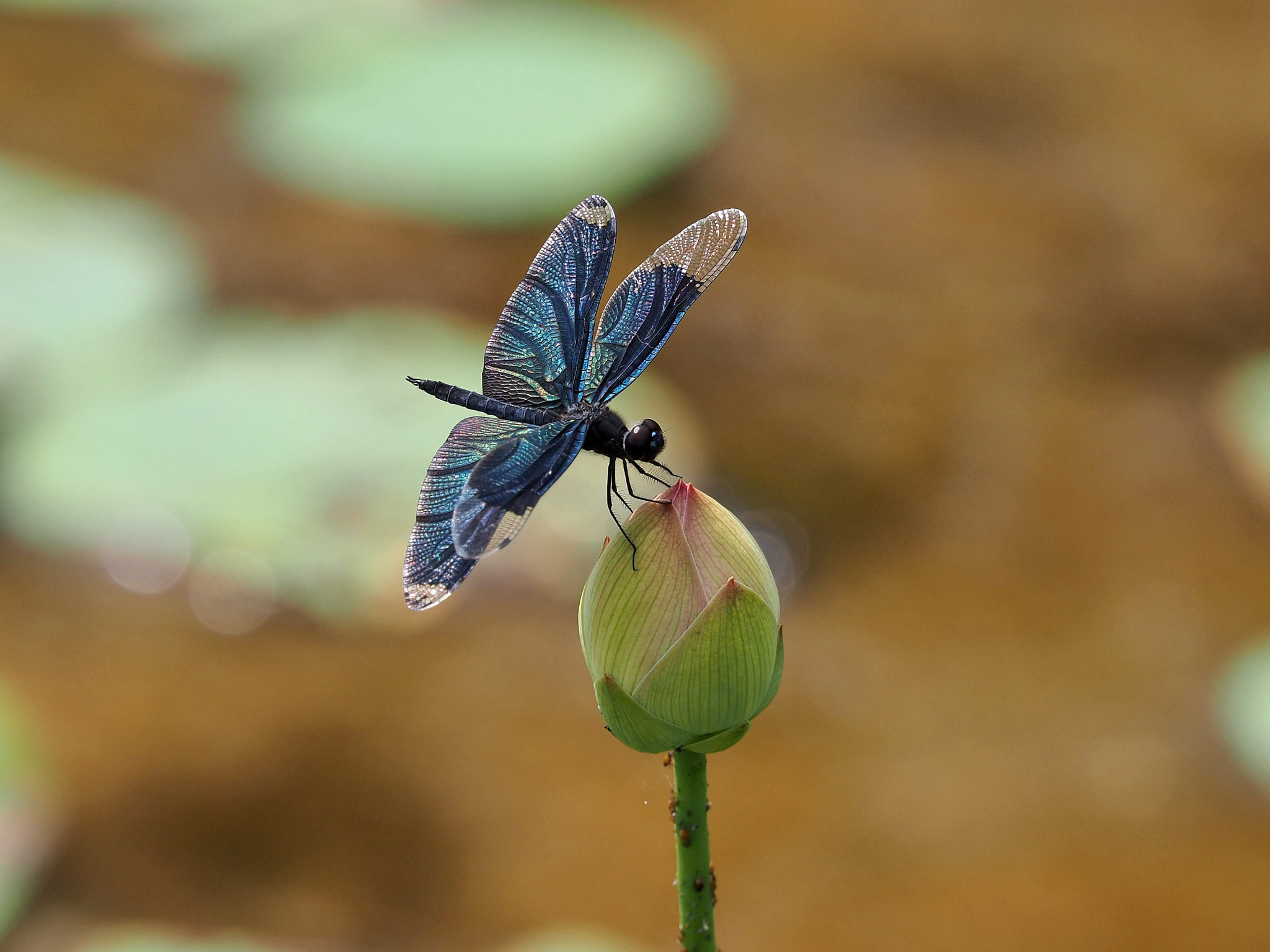
R. fuliginosa on a lotus.

The species epithet is derived from Latin fuliginosus meaning "sooty." The genus name is derived from Ancient Greek ῥυῆναι, rhyēnai, meaning "having flown," and θέμις, -themis in Ancient Greek, meaning "customary law," a name invoked in many Libellulid genera named by Hermann August Hagen (such as Erythemis or Trithemis). Along with being an epithet which is shared by the Greek goddess of the same name, Themis. Fliedner and Martins suspect during the naming of Rhyothemis by Hagen, the prefix was inspired by the (at the time) recently discovered Rhyolite, a multicolored volcanic rock resembling the iridescent wings exhibited by the genus.

The English language names refer to the Japanese language name, which directly translates to "butterfly dragonfly." The common name refers to the wide, iridescent wings along with the unique fluttering flight the species exhibits which resembles that of a butterfly. It shares this Japanese common name with the related Rhyothemis variegata, which is known as オキナワチョウトンボ (okinawa chou-tonbo, "Okinawa butterfly dragonfly").
