= Chairman Hu =

Chairman Hu may refer to:

- Hu Yaobang (1915–1989), Chairman of the Chinese Communist Party (1981–1982) and General Secretary of the Chinese Communist Party (1982–1987)
- Hu Jintao (1942–), Paramount leader of China (2002–2012), General Secretary of the Chinese Communist Party (2002–2012), President of China (2003–2013), and Chairman of the Central Military Commission (2004–2013)
