= Yonggu =

Yonggu may refer to:

- Yonggu, Guangdong, a town in Guangdong County, China
- Yonggu Mausoleum, the mausoleum of Empress Feng (442–490), in Shanxi Province, China
