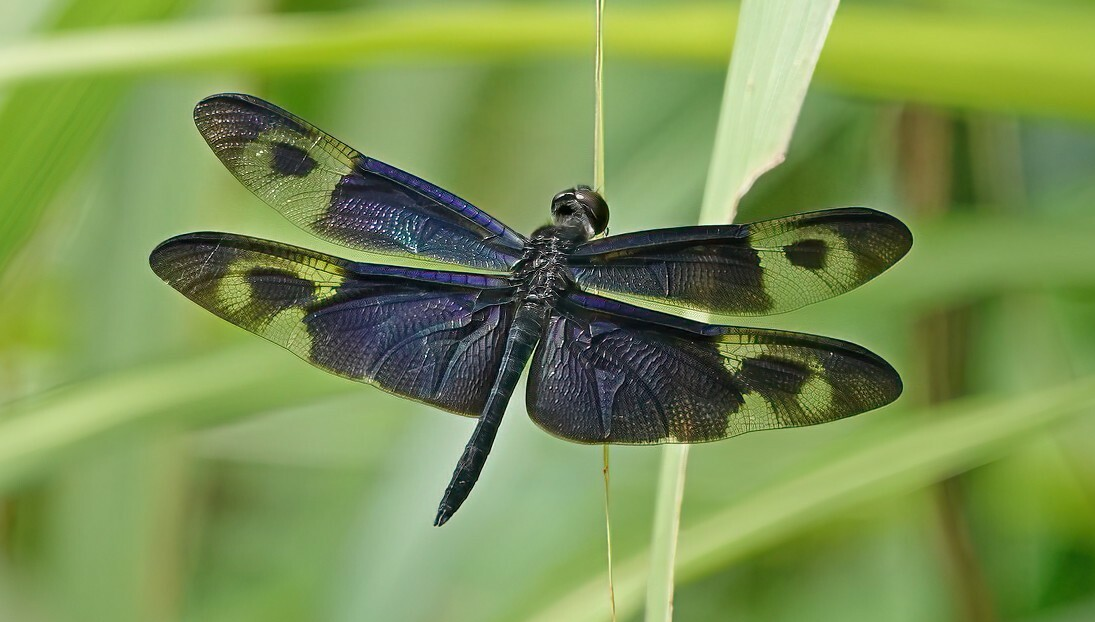
- A specimen in northeastern Taiwan

Scientific classification
- Kingdom: Animalia
- Phylum: Arthropoda
- Clade: Pancrustacea
- Class: Insecta
- Order: Odonata
- Infraorder: Anisoptera
- Superfamily: Libelluloidea
- Family: Libellulidae
- Genus: Rhyothemis
- Species: R. regia

Binomial name
- Rhyothemis regia (Brauer, 1867)

Subspecies
- (see text)

= Rhyothemis regia =

Pied sapphire flutterer

Species of dragonfly

Rhyothemis regia, sometimes called the pied sapphire flutterer, is a species of dragonfly found on islands of the Indo-Pacific region in Indonesia, New Guinea, the Philippines, Taiwan, and more remote Pacific islands such as Samoa and the Northern Mariana Islands.

== Taxonomy ==
Rhyothemis regia is placed in the genus Rhyothemis, a group of dragonflies known as "flutterers" placed in the subfamily Sympetrinae, family Libellulidae. The flutterers are known for their large wings with dark coloured markings, and are abundant, forming aggregations or swarms to feed. Rh. regia is sometimes called the "pied sapphire flutterer".

Rhyothemis regia was first scientifically described in the genus Celithemis as C. regia in 1867 by Friedrich M. Brauer. The description was published in a German article titled "Beschreibung neuer exotischer Libellen aus den Gattungen Neurothemis, Libellula, Diplax, Celithemis und Tramea" (transl. Description of new exotic dragonflies from the genera [...]). Brauer described the species' appearance in detail and gave measurements for male and female specimens. The male type specimen is stored in the Natural History Museum, Vienna.

In 1868, Braeur transferred his species to the genus Rhyothemis, described the previous year. Brauer placed the species now known as Rhyothemis regia in a group of Rhyothemis species he characterized as mainly metallic black with metallic wings either wispy or entirely black in colour. The group also included species Rh. chalcoptilon (which would later be accepted as a subspecies of Rh. regia), Rh. semihyalina, Rh. cognata, Rh. pygmaea, and Rh. fuliginosa.

== Subspecies ==
Seven subspecies as well as the nominate are recognized:

- Rh. regia regia (nominate)
- Rh. regia armstrongi Fraser, 1956
- Rh. regia chalcoptilon (Brauer, 1867)
- Rh. regia exul Ris, 1913
- Rh. regia juliana Lieftnick, 1949
- Rh. regia pretiosa Selys, 1878
- Rh. regia thisbe Lieftnick, 1953
- Rh. regia uveae Marinov, 2021

=== Rhyothemis regia pretiosa ===
Subspecies Rhyothemis regia pretiosa is found in the Moluccas, on the islands of Buru and Seram. was first described as a full species in 1878 by Edmond de Sélys Longchamps before a synonymy with Rh. r. regia was proposed in 1913. However, 1942 article by Maurits Lieftinck argued that Rh. r. pretiosa was separable and distinct; the classification as a discrete subspecies is now accepted.

=== Rhyothemis regia thisbe ===
Subspecies Rhyothemis regia thisbe is found in the islands of southeast Indonesia, being found on Sumba and Flores of the Lesser Sundas and Buru of the Moluccas. The holotype specimen is stored in the Natural History Museum, Basel.

=== Rhyothemis regia uveae ===
Subspecies Rhyothemis regia uveae is endemic to Wallis Island. The taxon was established in 2021 by New Zealand entomologist Milen Marinov; the holotype male is stored in the New Zealand Arthropod Collection, along with several paratypes. Marinov named the subspecies based on the Wallisian name for the island, uvea.

== Bibliography ==
- Brauer, Friedrich (1867). "Beschreibung neuer exotischer Libellen aus den Gattungen Neurothemis, Libellula, Diplax, Celithemis und Tramea". Verhandlungen der Kaiserlich-Königlichen Zoologisch-Botanischen Gesellschaft in Wien (in German). 17: 24–5 – via Biodiversity Heritage Library.
- Lieftinck, M.A. (1942). "The dragonflies (Odonata) of New Guinea and neighbouring islands, Part VI. Results of the Third Archbold Expedition 1938–1939 and of the Le Roux Expedition 1939 to Netherlands New Guinea (I. Anisoptera)". Treubia. 18: 441–608.
- Marinov, Milen (9 Sep 2021). "A taxonomic and biogeographic discussion on Rhyothemis regia (Brauer, 1867) from Samoa and neighbouring islands with introduction of Rhyothemis regia uveae subsp. nov. (Odonata: Libellulidae)" (PDF). Faunistic Studies in South-East Asian and Pacific Island Odonata. 35. International Dragonfly Fund.
- Steinmann, Henrik (1997). World Catalogue of Odonata II: Anisoptera. Das Tierreich. De Gruyter. ISBN 3-11-014934-6.
- Yeh, Wen-Chi (2023). "An Amendment on the Record of Rhyothemis fuliginosa Selys, 1883 in Taiwan — a Newly Discovered Gynomorphic Wing Pattern in Female R. regia regia (Brauer, 1867) (Odonata: Libellulidae)" (PDF). Taiwanese Journal of Entomological Studies. 8 (1). doi:10.5281/ZENODO.7764019.
