= Zhonghe, Gaolan County =

Zhonghe
- Town
- 忠和镇
- Interactive map of Zhonghe
- Coordinates: 36.2279601°N 103.8010283°E
- Country: China
- Province: Gansu
- Prefecture-level city: Lanzhou
- County: Gaolan

Area
  - Total: 251 km^{2} (97 sq mi)
- Elevation: 1,720 m (5,640 ft)

Population (2018)
  - Total: 17,593

Zhonghe is a town of Gaolan County, Gansu, China. It is located 15 km from Lanzhou city centre. The town has an mountainous landscape and arid climate. About half of its arable land is irrigated. Owing to its location near Lanzhou, it has been developed into a logistics base. China National Highway 109 forms the transport artery of the town.

Planning documents of Lanzhou city government indicate that Zhonghe will be fully integrated in the urban area of Lanzhou. The town may become part of Anning District. The Lanzhou Zoo is being relocated to Zhonghe.

== Administrative divisions ==
Zhonghe governs one residential community and 8 villages:

- Yanchi residential community
- Zhonghe village
- Yachuan village
- Fengdeng village
- Pingxian village
- Liuhe village
- Yanchi village
- Luoguan village
- Shuiyuan village
