= Rehabilitation of wrongful convictions =

The rehabilitation of wrongful convictions (Chinese: 平反冤假错案; pinyin: Píngfǎn yuān jiǎ cuò'àn) refers to a series of actions to rehabilitate certain cases of wrongful convictions that began after the founding of the People's Republic of China in 1949 and during the Anti-Rightist Campaign. It was part of the Boluan Fanzheng led by Deng Xiaoping, Hu Yaobang and others after the end of the Cultural Revolution, and largely concluded in 1982. According to the People's Daily, more than three million wrongful convictions were evicted nationwide since 1978.

== Background ==
A large number of wrongful convictions occurred during the Cultural Revolution. During this period, 17.5% of state cadres, and up to 75% of those holding positions of deputy ministers and above of national government, and deputy governors and above of provincinal governments were charged for offences, and nearly 100 million people were implicated. From 10 November to 15 December 1978, the Central Committee of the Chinese Communist Party held a working conference lasting 36 days, centering around addressing the aftermath of the Cultural Revolution and condemning the Two Whatevers political doctrine. The 1976 Tiananmen incident became the first case in which those implicated were rehabilitated and cleared of all charges during the meeting. Later, at the suggestion of Deng Xiaoping, Hua Guofeng, Chairman of the CCP Central Committee, announced the rehabilitation of the "wrongful convictions and miscarriages of justice" on behalf of the Politburo and transferred all cases to the Organization Department of the CCP for review.

== Result ==
In 1979, the Supreme People's Court issued a report entitled Request for Instructions on Several Issues Concerning the Successful Completion of the Review and Correction of Wrongful Convictions. The report stated that since the third plenary session of the 11th CCP Central Committee in 1978, more than 241,000 "counter-revolutionary cases" sentenced since the Cultural Revolution had been reviewed, and more than 130,000 cases had been corrected. It added that more than 570,000 ordinary criminal cases were reviewed, and more than 350,000 wrongful convictions were corrected. Later, the CCP Central Committee continued to redress some major political cases, such as the case of the "61-person traitor group", the case of Liu Zhidan, and the redressing of CCP leaders persecuted during the Cultural Revolution, including former Chairman Liu Shaoqi who was persecuted to death. According to the People's Daily article Setting an Example and Establishing a Monument published on 1 June 1989, more than 3 million cases nationwide have been redressed since 1978.
