= Tan Yubao =

Tan Yubao (Chinese: 谭余保) (1899 – January 10, 1980) was a Chinese communist. He was born in Chaling County, Zhuzhou, Hunan Province. He was chairman (1935-1937) of the communist base (Soviet) on the border of Hunan and Jiangxi Provinces. He once intervened to save the life of Hu Yaobang. He was a delegate to the 3rd (1964-1975) and 4th (1975-1978) National People's Congress and a member of the Standing Committee for the 5th (1978-1983) National People's Congress. He was a member of the Chinese People's Political Consultative Conference.
