= Huaiji County =

Huaiji 怀集县 Waitsap
- County
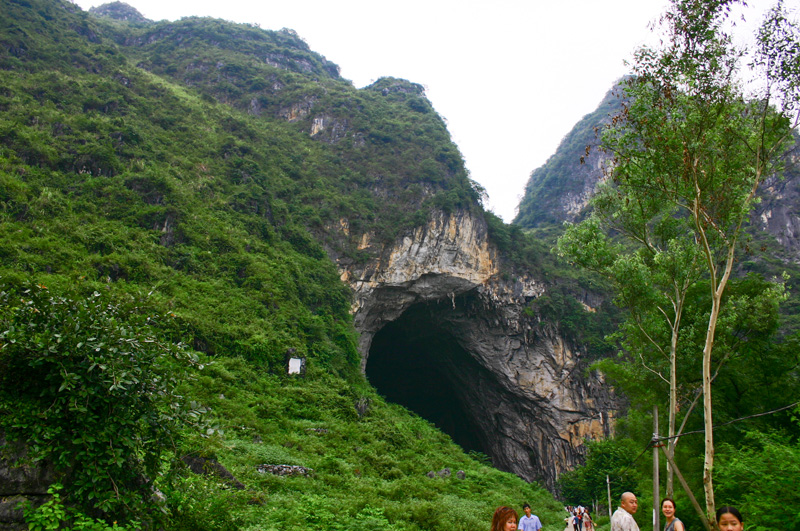

- Location of the seat in Guangdong
- Coordinates: 23°59′N 112°12′E
- Country: People's Republic of China
- Province: Guangdong
- Prefecture-level city: Zhaoqing

Area
  - Total: 3,573 km^{2} (1,380 sq mi)

Population (2020)
  - Total: 805,177
  - Density: 225.4/km^{2} (583.7/sq mi)
- Time zone: UTC+8 (China Standard)
- Division code: HJX

Huaiji County (simplified Chinese: 怀集县; traditional Chinese: 懷集縣; pinyin: Huáijí Xiàn) is a county of western Guangdong province, People's Republic of China. It is under the administration of Zhaoqing City. During the ROC period, Huaiji County was part of Guangxi Province.

== Administrative divisions ==
Name	Chinese (S)	Hanyu Pinyin	Population (2010)	Area (km^{2})
Huaicheng town	怀城镇	Huáichéng Zhèn	146,839	262.02
Zhagang town	闸岗镇	Zhágǎng Zhèn	17,665	84.83
Ao'zi town	坳仔镇	Àozǐ Zhèn	32,777	206.32
Wenlang town	汶朗镇	Wènlǎng Zhèn	16,542	86.16
Gansa town	甘洒镇	Gānsǎ Zhèn	17,429	132.21
Fenggang town	凤岗镇	Fènggǎng Zhèn	30,477	277
Qiashui town	洽水镇	Qiàshuǐ Zhèn	28,193	529
Liangcun town	梁村镇	Liángcūn Zhèn	64,952	88.9
Dagang town	大岗镇	Dàgǎng Zhèn	59,455	116
Gangping town	岗坪镇	Gǎngpíng Zhèn	30,116	53.78
Lengkeng town	冷坑镇	Lěngkēng Zhèn	95,881	160.2
Maning town	马宁镇	Mǎníng Zhèn	38,913	58
Langang town	蓝钟镇	Lánzhōng Zhèn	17,593	210
Yonggu town	永固镇	Yǒnggù Zhèn	36,709	189
Shidong town	诗洞镇	Shīdòng Zhèn	54,347	325
Qiaotou town	桥头镇	Qiáotóu Zhèn	44,647	213
Zhongzhou town	中洲镇	Zhōngzhōu Zhèn	77.1140,524	200.4
Lianmai town	连麦镇	Liánmài Zhèn	32,394	119
Shuai Township	下帅壮族瑶族乡	Xiàshuài Zhuàngzú Yáozú Xiāng	7,579	77.11

== Climate ==
Climate data for Huaiji, elevation 107 m (351 ft), (1991–2020 normals, extremes 1956–2010)
Month	Jan	Feb	Mar	Apr	May	Jun	Jul	Aug	Sep	Oct	Nov	Dec	Year
Record high °C (°F)	28.5 (83.3)	32.1 (89.8)	34.1 (93.4)	35.0 (95.0)	36.1 (97.0)	38.0 (100.4)	40.6 (105.1)	39.1 (102.4)	38.1 (100.6)	36.6 (97.9)	33.9 (93.0)	28.8 (83.8)	40.6 (105.1)
Mean daily maximum °C (°F)	16.7 (62.1)	19.2 (66.6)	21.3 (70.3)	25.6 (78.1)	30.0 (86.0)	32.2 (90.0)	33.9 (93.0)	33.9 (93.0)	32.4 (90.3)	29.1 (84.4)	24.3 (75.7)	19.0 (66.2)	26.5 (79.6)
Daily mean °C (°F)	11.7 (53.1)	14.4 (57.9)	17.2 (63.0)	21.3 (70.3)	25.2 (77.4)	27.3 (81.1)	28.4 (83.1)	28.1 (82.6)	26.8 (80.2)	23.1 (73.6)	18.2 (64.8)	13.1 (55.6)	21.2 (70.2)
Mean daily minimum °C (°F)	8.3 (46.9)	11.0 (51.8)	14.3 (57.7)	18.1 (64.6)	22.0 (71.6)	24.3 (75.7)	24.9 (76.8)	24.5 (76.1)	23.1 (73.6)	18.9 (66.0)	14.2 (57.6)	9.2 (48.6)	17.7 (63.9)
Record low °C (°F)	−3.5 (25.7)	−0.2 (31.6)	0.6 (33.1)	8.0 (46.4)	12.8 (55.0)	17.4 (63.3)	20.6 (69.1)	21.0 (69.8)	14.9 (58.8)	6.5 (43.7)	1.9 (35.4)	−2.4 (27.7)	−3.5 (25.7)
Average precipitation mm (inches)	71.4 (2.81)	68.8 (2.71)	148.9 (5.86)	204.3 (8.04)	277.8 (10.94)	298.8 (11.76)	212.7 (8.37)	190.9 (7.52)	93.9 (3.70)	54.9 (2.16)	50.8 (2.00)	46.0 (1.81)	1,719.2 (67.68)
Average precipitation days (≥ 0.1 mm)	10.4	11.7	18.1	17.3	19.7	20.1	17.8	17.2	10.5	5.4	7.0	7.3	162.5
Average snowy days	0.1	0	0	0	0	0	0	0	0	0	0	0	0.1
Average relative humidity (%)	77	79	83	82	82	83	81	81	78	74	75	74	79
Mean monthly sunshine hours	97.8	75.8	58.8	82.2	127.7	150.5	208.3	203.8	196.1	199.6	165.8	145.7	1,712.1
Percentage possible sunshine	29	24	16	22	31	37	50	51	54	56	51	44	39
Source: China Meteorological AdministrationPOR start year and all-time record low
