= Qian Changzhao =

Chinese politician

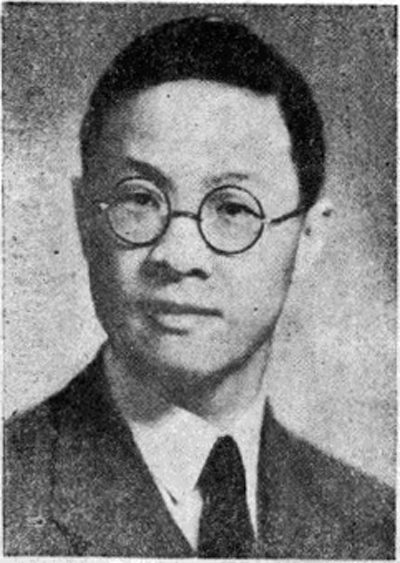
- Born: November 2, 1899
- Died: October 14, 1988 (aged 88)

Qian Changzhao (Chinese: 钱昌照; November 2, 1899 – October 14, 1988) was a Chinese politician, who served as the vice chairperson of the Chinese People's Political Consultative Conference.
