= Shichuan =

Coordinates: 36.1608339°N 104.0095927°E

Shichuan 什川镇
- Town
- Interactive map of Shichuan
- Country: China
- Province: Gansu
- Prefecture: Lanzhou
- County: Gaolan County
- Time zone: UTC+8 (China Standard Time)

Shichuan (Chinese: 什川鎮; pinyin: Shíchuān zhèn) is a town of Gaolan County, Lanzhou, Gansu Province, People's Republic of China.

The town was first historically described as a military garrison and fort, established in 1495 during the reign of the Hongzhi Emperor in the Ming Dynasty, being located in strategic position in a bend of the Yellow River. The town is known for its large ancient pear orchard, with trees up to 500 years old, and the orchard itself being established 600 years ago. The Great Wall of China crosses the Yellow River at Shichuan town as well, a few ruins of it are still visible.

== Villages ==
Shichuan administers 9 villages: Shangche, Changpo, Nanzhuang, Beizhuang, Shangniwan, Xianiwan, Hekou, Damogou and Jieguanting.
