= Former Residence of Hu Yaobang =

- 胡耀邦故居
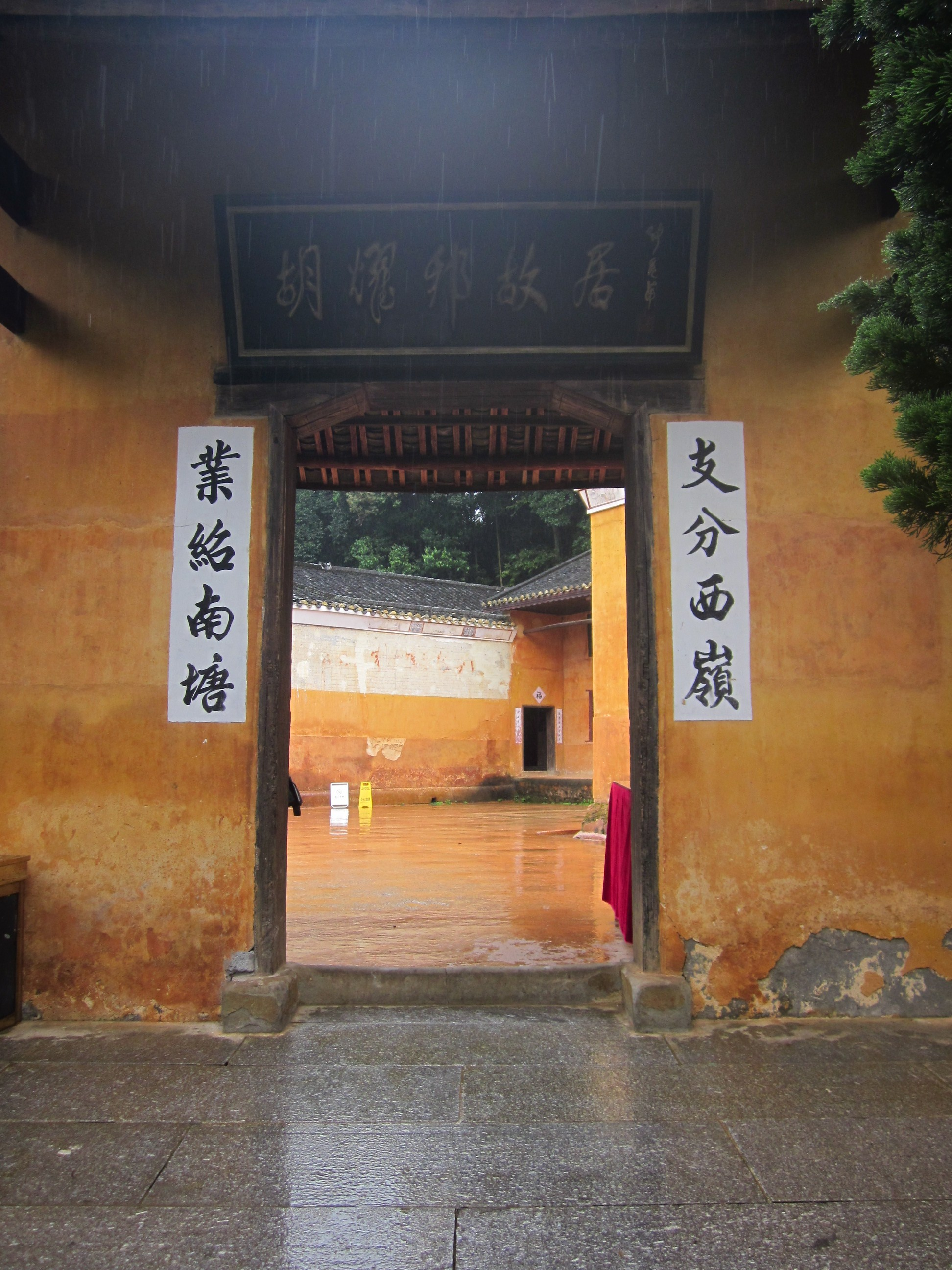
- Entrance of the Former Residence of Hu Yaobang.

- Location within Hunan

General information
- Type: Traditional folk houses
- Architectural style: Chinese architecture
- Location: Zhonghe Town, Liuyang, Hunan, China
- Coordinates: 28°04′54″N 113°53′07″E
- Completed: 1851–1862
- Owner: Government of Liuyang

Technical details
- Material: Brick and wood
- Floor area: 450 m^{2} (4,800 sq ft)

Design and construction
- Architects: Hu Mingzhong; Hu Mingjing

The Former Residence of Hu Yaobang or Hu Yaobang's Former Residence (Chinese: 胡耀邦故居; pinyin: Hú Yàobāng Gùjū) was built during the Xianfeng period of the Qing Dynasty (1851–1862) and is located in Cangfang Village, Zhonghe Town, Liuyang, Hunan. It covers a building area of about 450 square metres (4,800 sq ft) including buildings such as the old houses, Yaobang Square, the ancestral temple, the ancestral grave, the Cultural Relic Exhibition Hall, and the old well.

== History ==
The residence was built by Hu Yaobang's great-grandfather Hu Mingzhong (胡明鍾) and Hu Mingzhong's elder brother Hu Mingjing (胡明鏡) in the Qing dynasty during the reign of the Xianfeng Emperor (1851–1862).

On 13 November 1915, Hu Yaobang was born in the home. Here, he spent his childhood and youth until October 1930 when he was transferred to be the director of the Xiangdong Children's Bureau stationed in Anyuan, Jiangxi, before leaving his hometown.

In 1962, when Hu Yaobang returned home and visited it, he told his relatives not to rebuild the home. Despite this wish, the residence was rebuilt in February 1995 by the People's Government of Liuyang City. In September, Hu Yaobang's wife Li Zhao (李昭) visited the residence. The next year, the residence was listed as a Hunan Province most important culture and relics site.

In 2002, it was listed as a Provincial Patriotic Education Base. In February 2005, the Cultural Relic Exhibition Hall was built. On 6 May 2013, it was listed as a "Major National Historical and Cultural Site" by the State Council of China. On 12 April 2014, Hu Jintao visited the residence. In December 2020, it was rated as the fourth batch of national first-class museums.

== Gallery ==
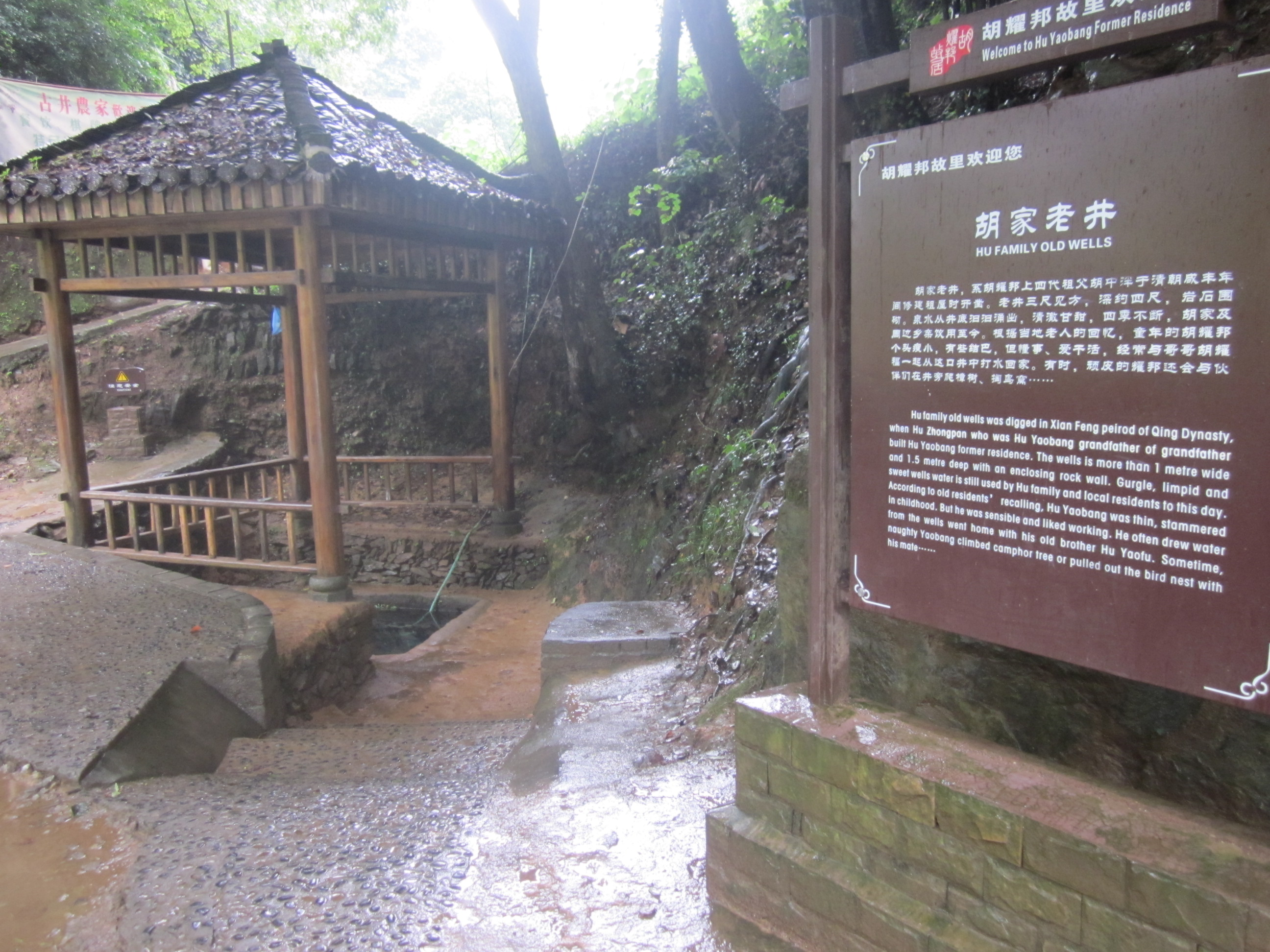
Hu Family Old Well

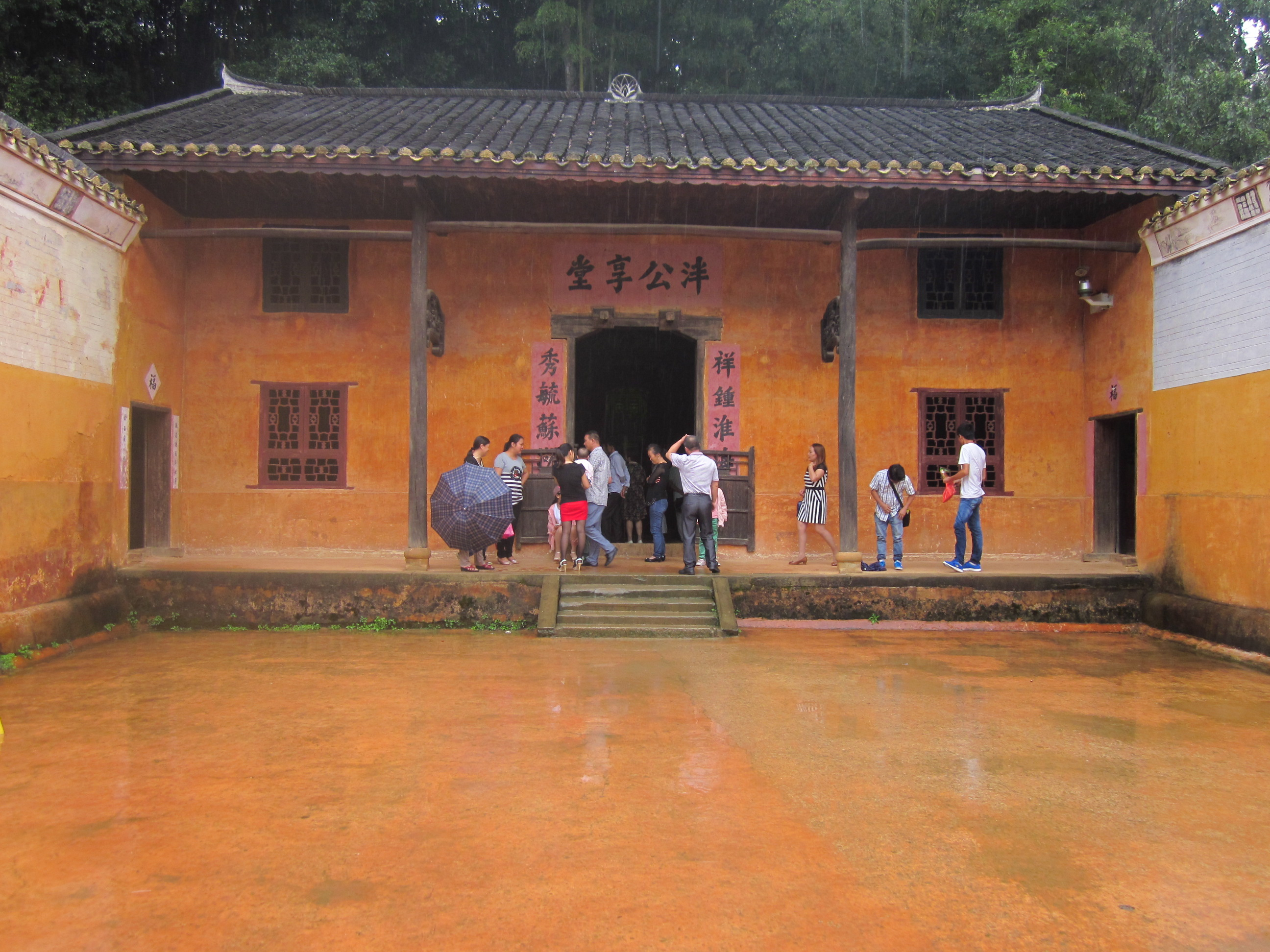
The House

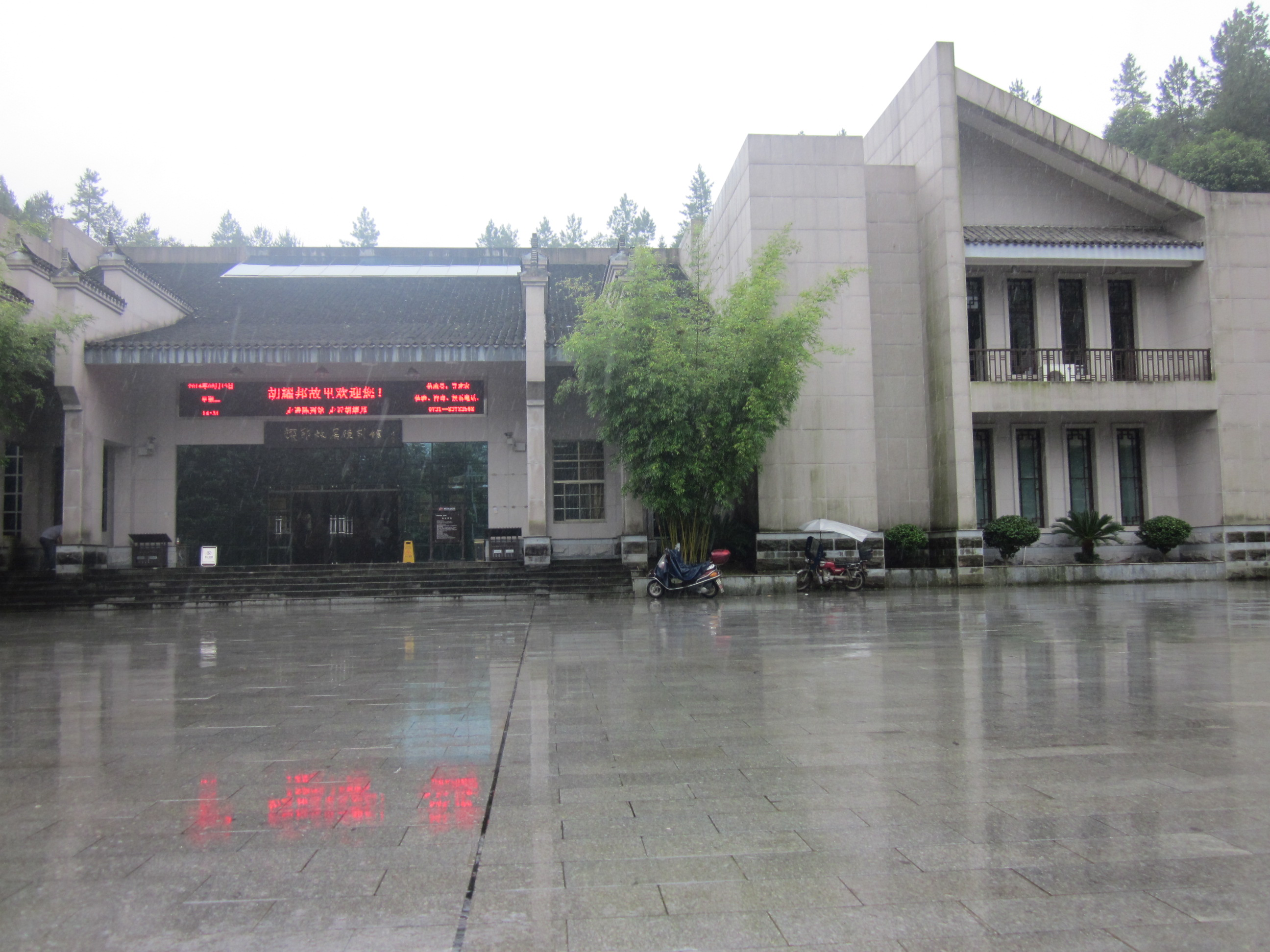
Cultural relics Exhibition Hall

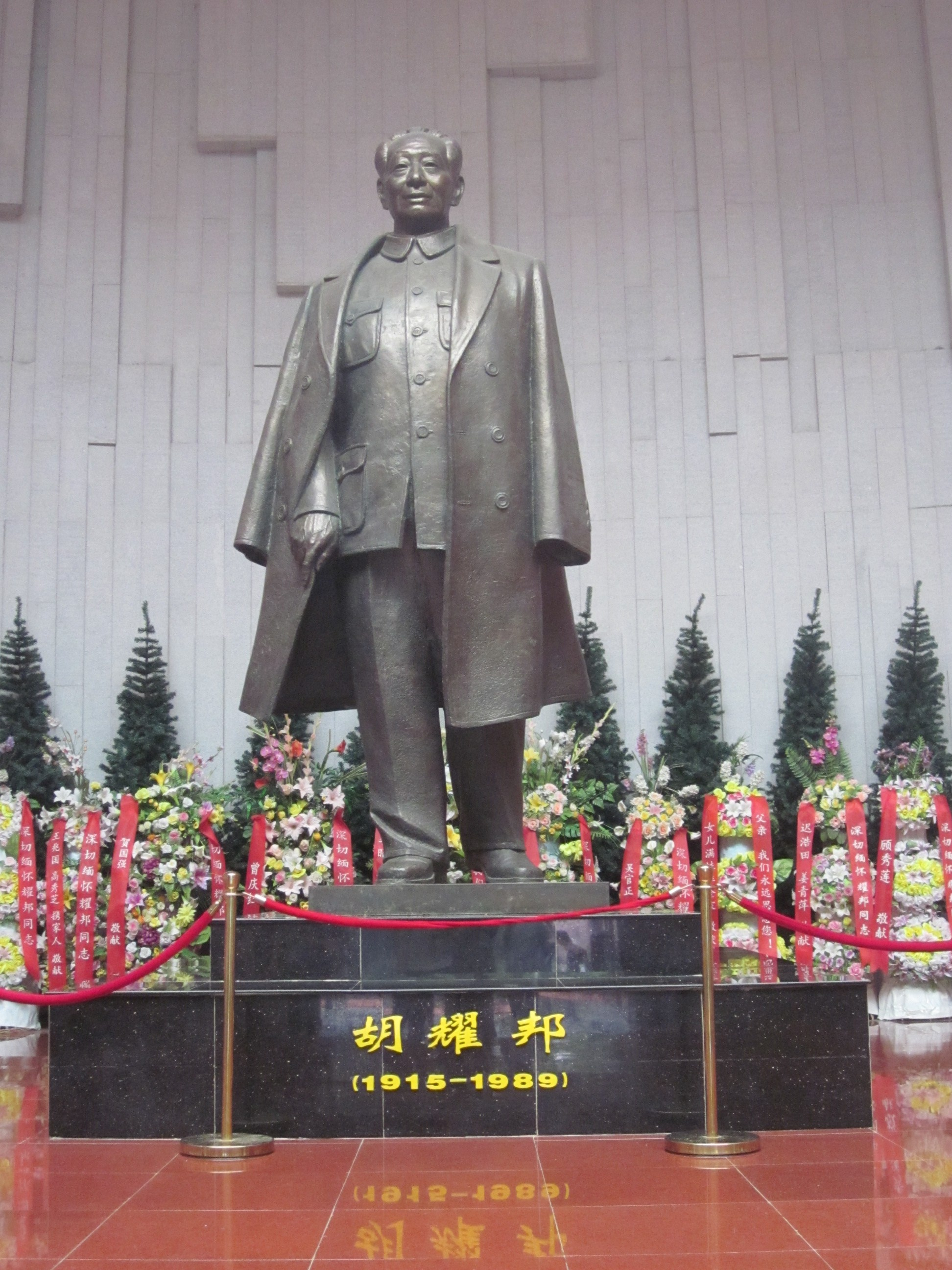
Hu's Statue

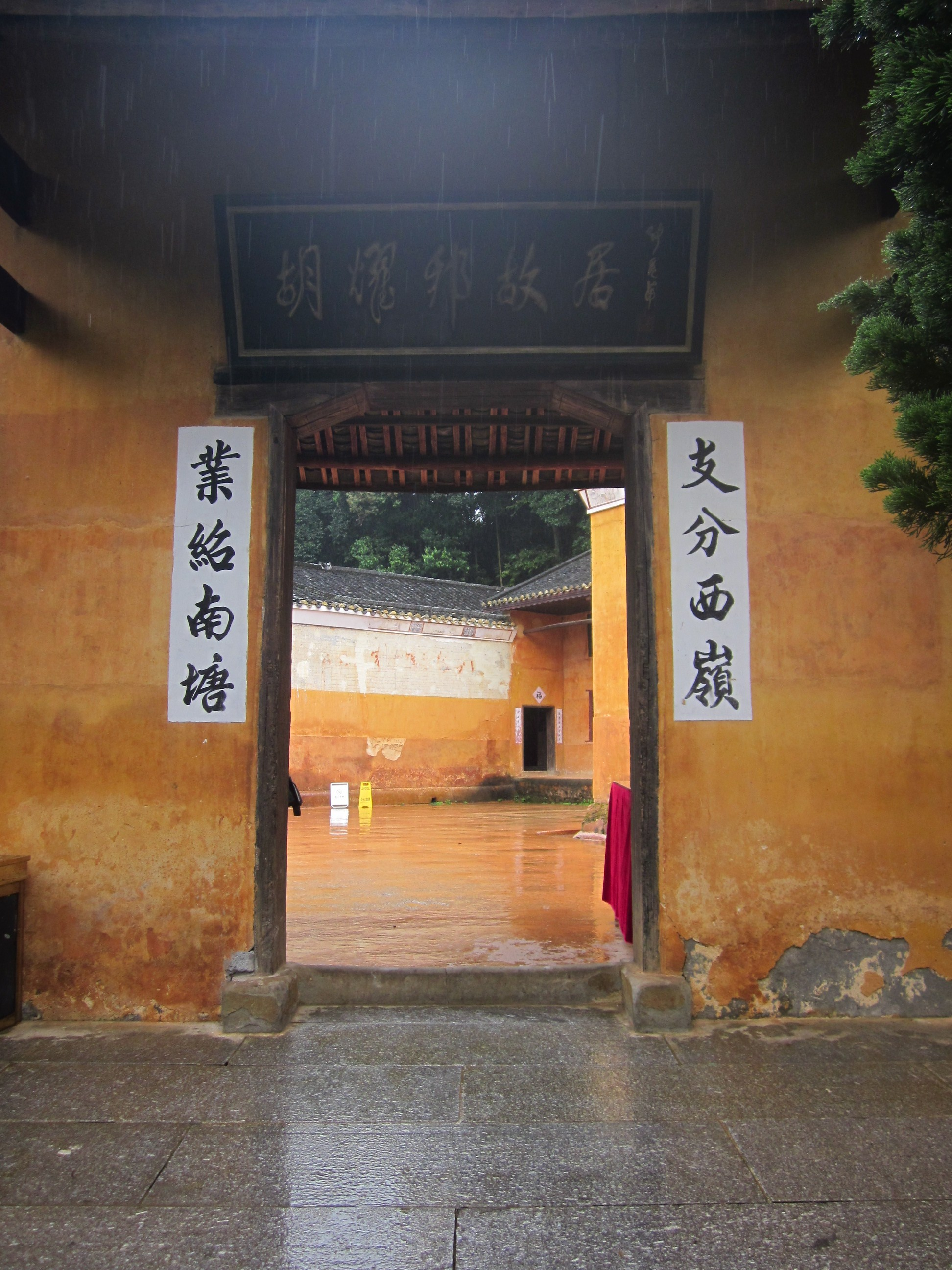
The gate.
