= Yonggu, Guangdong =

Yonggu 永固镇
- Town
- Location in Guangdong
- Coordinates: 23°43′04″N 112°04′19″E
- Country: People's Republic of China
- Province: Guangdong
- Prefecture-level city: Zhaoqing
- County: Huaiji

Area
  - Total: 189 km^{2} (73 sq mi)
- Elevation: 98 m (322 ft)

Population (2010)
  - Total: 36,709
  - Density: 194/km^{2} (503/sq mi)
- Time zone: UTC+8 (China Standard)
- Area code: 0758

Yonggu (Chinese: 永固; pinyin: Yǒnggù; Jyutping: wing^{5} gu^{3}) is a town of Huaiji County in western Guangdong province, China. The Yonggu dialect of the Biao language is spoken there.
