= Shidong, Gaolan County =

Shidong 石洞镇
- Town
- Interactive map of Shidong
- Country: China
- Province: Gansu
- Prefecture-level city: Lanzhou
- County: Gaolan

Area
  - Town: 412 km^{2} (159 sq mi)
- Elevation: 1,700 m (5,600 ft)

Population
  - Town: 51,700
  - Urban: 25,600
  - Rural: 26,100

Shidong is a town of Gaolan County, Lanzhou, China. It is also the county seat of Gaolan. The town is named after the local Shidong temple, built in the Yuan dynasty. Shidong district was established in 1949. In 1957, Shidong district became Shidong township. In 2004, Shidong merged with Chengguan town and became Shidong town. The town has a population of 51,700 residents.
