= Hu Yaobang =

Chinese politician (1915–1989)

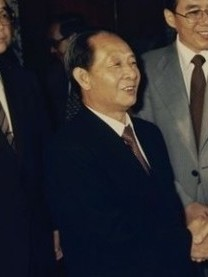
- Hu on a visit to Rome in 1985

General Secretary of the Chinese Communist Party
- In office 12 September 1982 – 15 January 1987
- Preceded by: Himself (as Chairman)
- Succeeded by: Zhao Ziyang

Chairman of the Chinese Communist Party
- In office 29 June 1981 – 12 September 1982
- Deputy: Ye Jianying
- Preceded by: Hua Guofeng
- Succeeded by: Himself (as General Secretary)

General Secretary of the Secretariat of the Chinese Communist Party
- In office 29 February 1980 – 12 September 1982
- Chairman: Hua Guofeng; Himself
- Preceded by: Deng Xiaoping (1966)
- Succeeded by: Hu Qili (First Secretary)

Personal details
- Born: 20 November 1915 Liuyang, Hunan, Republic of China
- Died: 15 April 1989 (aged 73) Beijing, People's Republic of China
- Resting place: Gongqingcheng, Jiujiang
- Party: Chinese Communist Party (1933–1989)
- Spouse: Li Zhao (m. 1941)
- Children: 4
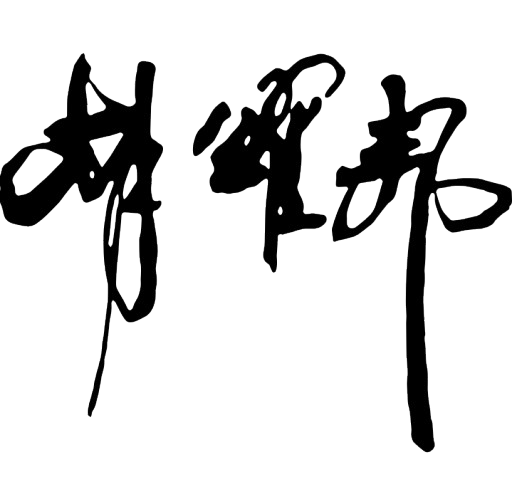
- Signature

Chinese name
- Chinese: 胡耀邦
Transcriptions
Standard Mandarin
- Hanyu Pinyin: Hú Yàobāng
- Wade–Giles: Hu^{2} Yao^{4}-pang^{1}
- IPA: [xǔ jâʊ.páŋ]
Yue: Cantonese
- Yale Romanization: Wùh Yiuh-bōng
- Jyutping: Wu4 Jiu6-bong1
- IPA: [wu˩ jiw˨ pɔŋ˥]
Southern Min
- Hokkien POJ: Hô Iāu-pang
- Central institution membership: 1980–1989: 11th, 12th, 13th Politburo Standing Committee; 1980–1989: 11th, 12th, 13th Politburo; 1980–1982: 11th Secretariat; 1972–1989: 8th, 9th, 10th, 11th, 12th, 13th Central Committee; 1954–1989: 1st, 2nd, 3rd, 4th, 5th, 6th 7th National People's Congress; Other offices held: 1978–1980: Head, Publicity Department/"Publicity Department"; 1977–1978: Head, Organization Department; 1964–1965: Party Committee Secretary, Shaanxi Province; 1953–1978: First Secretary, Communist Youth League

Hu Yaobang (Note: Chinese: 胡耀邦; pinyin: Hú Yàobāng) (20 November 1915 – 15 April 1989) was a Chinese politician who was a high-ranking official of the People's Republic of China. He held the top office of the Chinese Communist Party (CCP) from 1981 to 1987, first as Chairman from 1981 to 1982, then as General Secretary from 1982 to 1987. After the Cultural Revolution (1966–1976), Hu rose to prominence as a close ally of Deng Xiaoping, the paramount leader of China at the time.

Hu joined the CCP in the 1930s. During the Cultural Revolution, he was purged, recalled, and purged again by Mao Zedong. After Deng rose to power, following Mao's death, Hu played an important role in the Boluan Fanzheng program and oversaw the rehabilitation of wrongful convictions. Throughout the 1980s, he pursued a series of economic and political reforms under the supervision of Deng. Meanwhile, Hu's political and economic reforms also made him the enemy of several powerful Party elders, who opposed free-market and government reforms. When widespread student protests occurred across China in December 1986 and January 1987, Hu's political opponents blamed him for the disruptions and convinced Deng that Hu's tolerance of "bourgeois liberalization" had instigated the protests. Hu was forced to resign as General Secretary in early 1987, but allowed to retain his membership in the Politburo.

Hu's position as General Secretary was succeeded by his close ally Zhao Ziyang, who carried on many of Hu's economic and political reforms. A day after Hu's death in April 1989, a small-scale unofficial commemoration took place in Beijing, during which people demanded that the Chinese government reassess and recognize Hu's legacy; a week later, the day before Hu's funeral, some 100,000 students marched on Tiananmen Square, eventually leading to the 1989 Tiananmen Square protests and massacre in June. The Chinese government subsequently censored details of Hu's life, but in 2005 it commemorated him and lifted its censorships, on the occasion of his 90th birth anniversary. Hu was buried in Gongqingcheng in Jiangxi.

== Early years ==
=== Young revolutionary ===
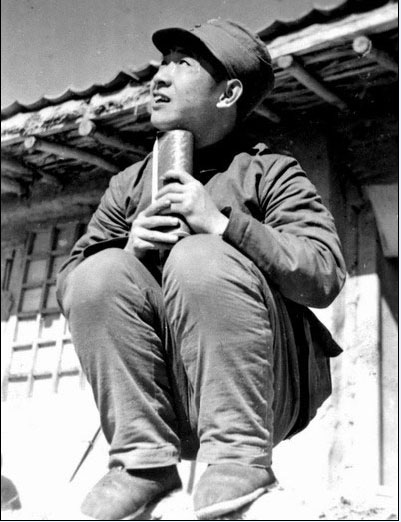
Hu Yaobang at Yan'an in the 1930s

Hu Yaobang's ancestors were Hakkas from Jiangxi. During the Ming dynasty (1368–1644) they migrated into Hunan, where Hu was born. Hu Yaobang was born into a poor peasant family. He did not receive a formal education and taught himself to read.

Hu participated in his first rebellion when he was twelve and left his family to join the Chinese Communist Party when he was only fourteen, becoming a full member of the Party in 1933. During the factional struggles that polarized the CCP during the 1930s, Hu supported Mao Zedong and opposed the 28 Bolsheviks.

Hu was one of the youngest veterans of the Long March. Once Mao was removed from power, shortly before the beginning of the Fourth Encirclement Campaign, Mao's supporters were persecuted, and Hu Yaobang was sentenced to death. Just before the beginning of the Long March, he and others were on their way to be beheaded. However, a powerful local communist commander named Tan Yubao intervened at the last minute, saving Hu's life. Because of Hu's support of Mao, he was deemed unreliable and ordered to join the Long March so that he could be placed under surveillance.

Hu Yaobang was seriously wounded in the battle of Mount Lu, near Zunyi, close to the area where Mao Zedong rose back to power via the Zunyi Conference. After Hu was wounded, the communist field medic teams chose not to help Hu, and left him in the battlefield to die on the side of the road. Hu was rescued by a childhood friend of his, a Chinese Red Army commander, who happened to pass by. Hu called out his friend's nickname to ask for help, and the friend helped him catch up with the retreating main force of the Chinese Red Army and get treatment for his wounds.

Hu was taken prisoner by the KMT during the Long March. In 1936, Hu had joined an expeditionary force led by Zhang Guotao. The objective of Zhang's 21,800+ strong force, was to cross the Yellow River, to expand the communist base west of Shaanxi, and to link up with forces from the Soviet Union or with the Xinjiang warlord Sheng Shicai, who was an ally of the communists and the Soviet Union. Zhang Guotao's forces were soundly defeated by the local Nationalist warlords, the Ma clique. Hu Yaobang, along with Qin Jiwei, became two of the thousands of prisoners-of-war captured by Ma clique's forces. Hu was one of only 1,500 prisoners-of-war whom Ma Bufang decided to use as forced labor rather than execute.

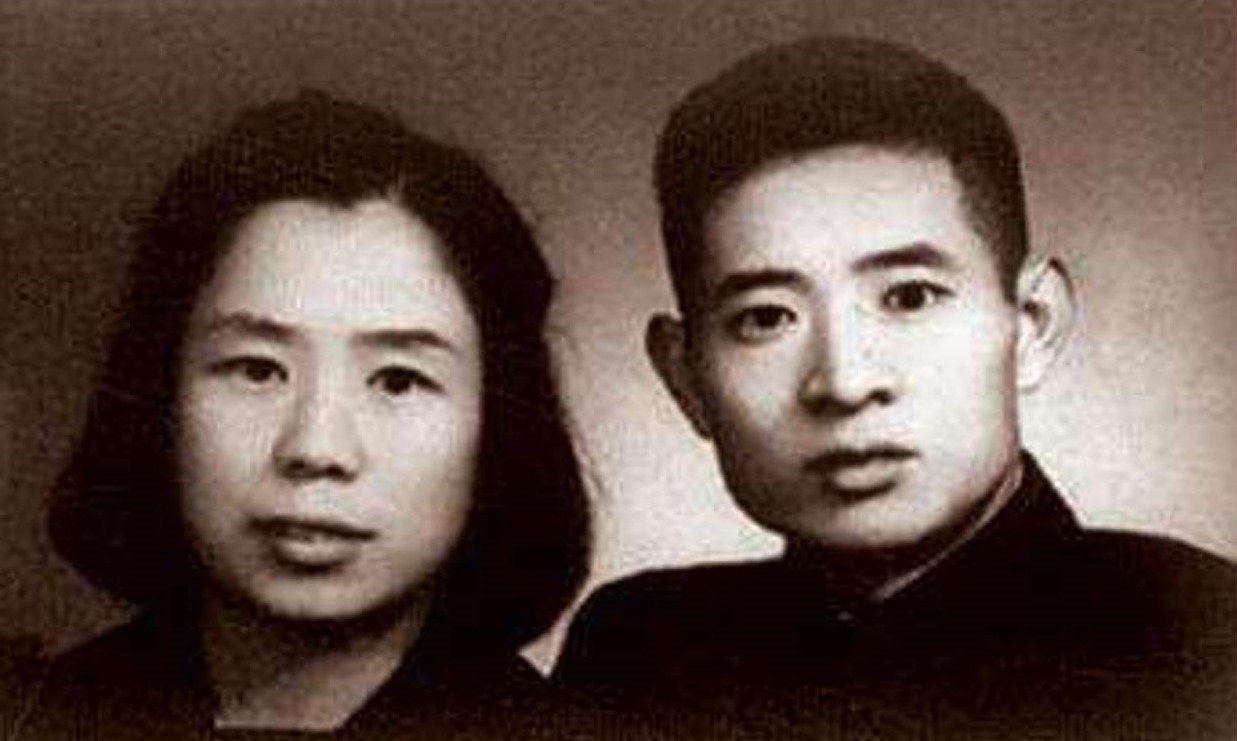
Hu Yaobang and his wife Li Zhao

Ma Bufang sent several Muslim cavalry divisions under General Ma Biao to fight against the Japanese. However Chiang Kai-shek pressured Ma Bufang to contribute even more of his troops to fight Japanese invaders, Ma Bufang decided that, instead of using more of his own troops, he would instead send the 1,500 Chinese Red Army prisoners-of-war as conscripts. Since the marching route had to pass the border of the communist base in Shaanxi, Hu Yaobang and Qin Jiwei decided to return to the Communists, and secretly organized an escape. The escape took place as planned and was a success: out of the total 1,500 POWs, more than 1,300 successfully returned to Yan'an. Mao personally welcomed these returning communists, and Hu Yaobang returned to communist forces, where he would remain for rest of his life.

After Hu arrived in Yan'an, he attended the Counter-Japanese Military School. While studying in Yan'an, Hu met and married his wife, Li Zhao, who was also a student in Yan'an. After his training, Hu worked in the political department, and was assigned to work as a member of Peng Dehuai's Third Front Army.

Hu befriended and worked closely with Deng Xiaoping in the 1930s. In the 1940s, Hu worked under Deng as a political commissar in the Second Field Army. In the final stages of the Chinese Civil War, Hu accompanied Deng to Sichuan, and communist forces successfully took control of the province from Nationalist forces in 1949.

=== Land reform movement ===
During the final round of China's land reform movement, Hu took part in the Party's efforts to restrain peasant violence against landlords, explaining that calls to "annihilate" landlords meant to take landlord property, not lives. Hu instructed Party work teams never to "use beheadings to solve problems[.]" In Hu's view, execution of "evil tyrants" (meaning the most exploitive or criminal landlords) and counterrevolutionary landlords was appropriate: "It is entirely they who force us to kill them."

=== Early PRC politician ===
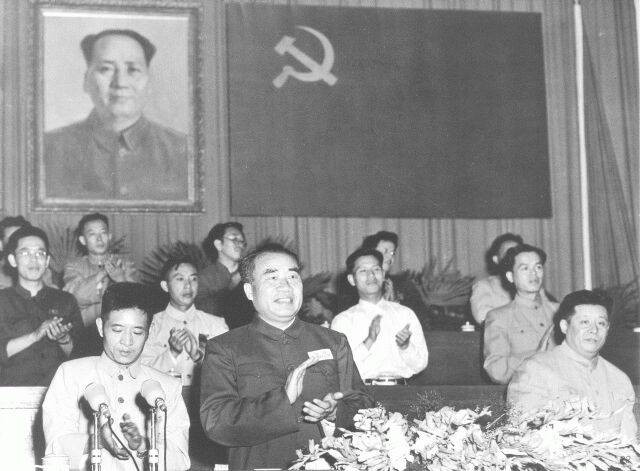
Hu Yaobang, Zhu De, and Liao Chengzhi at the National Youth Congress in 1953 (left to right)

In 1949, the CCP successfully defeated Nationalist forces on mainland China, and the communists founded the People's Republic. In 1952, Hu accompanied Deng to Beijing, and Hu became the leader of the Communist Youth League from 1952 to 1966. Hu rose rapidly up the Communist Party hierarchy, until Mao sent Hu to work as First Party Secretary of Shaanxi in 1964, saying: "He needs some practical training". Hu may have been assigned to work outside of Beijing because he was judged as being not sufficiently enthusiastic about Maoism. Unlike many of his colleagues, Hu was able to keep his membership within the Party Central Committee until the 9th Party Congress in April 1969.

During the Cultural Revolution, Hu was purged twice and rehabilitated twice, mirroring the political career of Hu's mentor, Deng Xiaoping. In 1969, Hu was recalled to Beijing to be persecuted. Hu became "number one" among the "Three Hus", whose names were vilified and who were paraded through Beijing wearing heavy wooden collars around their necks. The other two "Hus" were Hu Keshi, who was the second most senior member of the Communist Youth League, and Hu Qili, who was third most senior in the Communist Youth League and who had also become a close associate of Deng Xiaoping. After being publicly humiliated, Hu was sent to an isolated work camp to participate in "reformation through labour" under strict security. While in political exile Hu was forced to work hauling large boulders by hand.

When Deng was temporarily recalled to Beijing, from 1973 to 1976, Hu was also recalled; but, when Deng was purged again, in 1976, Hu was also purged. After his second purge, Hu was sent to herd cattle. Hu was recalled and rehabilitated a second time in 1977, shortly after Mao's death. After Hu was recalled, he was promoted to directing the Party's organizational department, and later directed Party propaganda through a department of the Politburo. Hu was one of the main leaders responsible for re-assessing the fates of people who had been persecuted during the Cultural Revolution. According to the Chinese government, Hu was personally responsible for exonerating over three million people. Hu tacitly supported the 1978 Democracy Wall protesters, and invited two of the activists to his home in Beijing. Hu opposed Hua Guofeng's "Two Whatevers" policy, and was an important supporter of Deng Xiaoping's ascent to power.

== Reformer ==
=== Public policies ===
Hu Yaobang's rise to power was supported by Deng Xiaoping, and Hu rose to the highest levels of the Party after Deng displaced Hua Guofeng as China's "paramount leader". In 1980 Hu became general secretary and was elected to the powerful Politburo Standing Committee. In 1981, Hu became CCP Chairman, but helped abolish the position of Party chairman in 1982, as part of a broader effort to distance China from Maoist politics. Most of the chairman's functions were transferred to the post of General Secretary, a post taken by Hu. Deng's displacement of Hua Guofeng marked the Party leadership's consensus that China should abandon strict Maoist economics in favor of more pragmatic policies, and Hu directed many of Deng's attempts to reform the Chinese economy. By 1982, Hu was the second most powerful person in China, after Deng. Throughout the last decade of Hu's career, he promoted the role of intellectuals as being fundamental to China's achievement of the Four Modernizations.

During the early 1980s, Deng referred to Hu and Zhao Ziyang as his "left and right hands". After advancing to the position of general secretary, Hu promoted a number of political reforms, often collaborating with Zhao. The ultimate goals of Hu's reforms were sometimes vaguely defined. Hu attempted to reform China's political system by: requiring candidates to be directly elected in order to enter the Politburo; holding more elections with more than one candidate; increasing government transparency; increasing public consultation before determining Party policy; and, increasing the degree to which government officials could be held directly responsible for their mistakes.

During his time in office, Hu tried to rehabilitate the people who were persecuted during the Cultural Revolution. Many Chinese people think that this was his most important achievement. He was also in favor of a pragmatic policy in the Tibet Autonomous Region after realising the mistakes of previous policies. He ordered the withdrawal of thousands of Han Chinese cadres from the Tibet Autonomous Region following a May 1980 visit to the region, believing that Tibetans and Uyghurs should be empowered to administer their own affairs. Hu reduced the number of Han party cadre, and relaxed social controls. Han Chinese who remained were required to learn Tibetan and Uyghur. He set out six requirements to improve 'existing conditions', including the increase of state funds to the Tibet Autonomous Region, improvements in education, and efforts to revive Tibetan and Uyghur culture. At the same time, Hu stated that "anything that is not suited to Tibet's conditions should be rejected or modified". Hu made a point of explicitly apologizing to Tibetans for China's misrule of the region during this trip. He also declared to cancel Bingtuan (soldier farmers) in Xinjiang Uyghur Autonomous Region, but he failed to do so due to Wang Zhen's opposition. Later, his ethnic policy was criticized by some high-level officials such as Deng Liqun, as well as some Han nationalists who think Hu Yaobang have given too many Social privilege to ethnic minorities.

Hu traveled widely throughout his time as general secretary, visiting 1500 individual districts and villages in order to inspect the work of local officials and to keep in touch with the common people. In 1971, Hu retraced the route of the Long March, and took the opportunity to visit and inspect remote military bases located in Tibet, Xinjiang Uyghur Autonomous Region, Yunnan, Qinghai, and Inner Mongolia.

=== Political opinions ===
Hu was notable for his liberalism and the frank expression of his opinions, which sometimes agitated other senior Chinese leaders. On a trip to Inner Mongolia in 1984, Hu publicly suggested that Chinese people might start eating in a Western way (with forks and knives, on individual plates) in order to prevent communicable diseases. He was one of the first Chinese officials to abandon wearing a Mao suit in favor of Western business suits. When asked which of Mao Zedong's theories were desirable for modern China, he reportedly replied "I think, none".

Hu was not prepared to abandon Marxism completely, but frankly expressed the opinion that Communism could not solve "all of mankind's problems". Hu encouraged intellectuals to raise controversial subjects in the media, including democracy, human rights, and the possibility of introducing legal limits to the Communist Party's influence within the Chinese government. Many party elders mistrusted Hu from the start and eventually grew to fear his influence. The ire of some of the Eight Elders ultimately contributed to his forced resignation from the post of general secretary.

Hu made sincere efforts to repair Sino-Japanese relations, but was criticized for the scope of his efforts. In 1984, when Beijing recognized the twelfth anniversary of Japan's diplomatic recognition of the People's Republic, Hu invited 3,000 Japanese youth to Beijing, and arranged for them to tour Shanghai, Hangzhou, Nanjing, Wuhan, and Xi'an. Many senior officials considered Hu's efforts extravagant, since Japan had only invited 500 Chinese youths to Japan the previous year. Hu was criticized internally for the lavish gifts that he gave to visiting Japanese officials, and for allowing his daughter to privately accompany Japanese prime minister Nakasone's son when they visited Beijing. Hu defended his actions by citing the importance of strong Sino-Japanese relations, and his belief that the atrocities committed by Japan in China during World War II were the actions of military warlords, and not ordinary citizens.

Hu alienated potential allies within the People's Liberation Army when he suggested for two consecutive years that the Chinese defense budget should be reduced, and senior military leaders began to criticize him. Military officials accused Hu of making poor choices when purchasing military hardware from Australia in 1985. When Hu visited Britain, military officials criticized him for drinking soup too loudly during a banquet hosted by Queen Elizabeth II.

Zhao and Hu began a large-scale anti-corruption programme, and permitted the investigations of the children of high-ranking Party elders, who had grown up protected by their parents' influence. Hu's investigation of Party officials belonging to this "Crown Prince Party" made Hu unpopular with many powerful Party officials. After Deng refused to support some of Hu's reforms, Hu made private comments critical of Deng Xiaoping for his indecisiveness and "old-fashioned" way of thinking, opinions of which Deng eventually became aware.

=== Resignation ===
In December 1986, a group of students organized public protests across over a dozen cities in support of political and economic liberalization. The protests began in the University of Science and Technology in Hefei, Anhui, where they were led by the activist and astrophysicist, Fang Lizhi, who was then vice president of the university. Fang talked openly about introducing political reforms which would end the influence of the Communist Party within the Chinese government. The protests were also led by two other "radical intellectuals", Wang Ruowang and Liu Binyan.

Deng Xiaoping disliked all three leaders, and ordered Hu to dismiss them from the Party in order to silence them, but Hu Yaobang refused. In January 1987, after two weeks of student protests demanding greater Western-style freedoms, a clique of Party elders, senior military officials and Deng Xiaoping forced Hu to resign on the grounds that he had been too lenient with student protesters and for moving too quickly towards free market-style economic reforms.

After Hu's forced dismissal, Deng Xiaoping promoted Zhao Ziyang to replace the liberal Hu as Party general secretary, putting Zhao in a position to succeed Deng as "paramount leader". Hu officially resigned as Party general secretary on 16 January, but retained his seat in the Politburo Standing Committee. When Hu "resigned", the Party forced him to issue a humiliating "self-criticism of his mistakes on major issues of political principles in violation of the party's principle of collective leadership". During the event, which consisted of all of the Elders, Politburo, Secretariat, and the Central Advisory Commission, all of his allies abandoned him with the exception of his close friend, Xi Zhongxun, who stood up and defended him and lashed out at everybody for Hu's treatment. Hu had to keep Xi from losing his temper, telling him "Don't worry about it, Zhongxun, I've got this." After that, Hu became more reclusive and less active in Chinese politics, studying revolutionary history and practicing his calligraphy in his spare time, and taking long walks for exercise. Hu was generally viewed as having no real power after his resignation, and he was relegated to largely ceremonial roles.

Hu's "resignation" harmed the credibility of the CCP while improving Hu's own. Among Chinese intellectuals Hu became an example of a man who refused to compromise his convictions in the face of political resistance, and who had paid the price as a result. The promotion of a conservative, Li Peng, to the position of premier after Hu's departure from executive-level positions made the government less enthusiastic to pursue reform, and upset plans of an orderly succession of power from Deng Xiaoping to any politician similar to Hu.

== Death, protests, and burial ==
(from left) Zhao Ziyang, Deng Xiaoping and Li Peng at Hu Yaobang's memorial service in the Great Hall of the People, on 22 April 1989

=== Death and public reactions ===
In October 1987, Hu retained his membership in the CCP's Central Committee at the 13th Party Congress, and was subsequently elected a member of the new Politburo by the first plenary session of the Central Committee. On 8 April 1989, Hu suffered a heart attack while attending a Politburo meeting in Zhongnanhai to discuss education reform. Hu was rushed to the hospital, accompanied by his wife. Hu died several days later, on 15 April, at age 73. Hu's last words were that he should be buried simply, without extravagance, in his hometown.

In his official obituary, Hu was described as "a long-tested and staunch communist warrior, a great proletarian revolutionist and statesman, an outstanding political leader for the Chinese army". Western reporters observed that Hu's obituary was intentionally "glowing" in order to divert suspicion that the Party had mistreated him. At the memorial service, Hu's widow Li Zhao blamed Hu's death on how harshly the party treated him, telling Deng Xiaoping "It's all because of you people!"

Although he had become a semi-retired official by the time of his death, and had been removed from positions of real power for his "mistakes", public pressure forced the Chinese government to give him a state funeral, attended by Party leaders. The eulogy at Hu's funeral praised his work in restoring political normality and promoting economic development after the Cultural Revolution. Public mourners at Hu's funeral lined up 16 kilometres (10 miles) long, a reaction which surprised China's leaders. Shortly after Hu's funeral, students in Beijing began petitioning the government to officially reverse the verdict that had led to Hu's "resignation", and to provide a more elaborate public funeral. The government then held a public memorial service for Hu in the Great Hall of the People.

On 22 April 1989, 50,000 students marched to Tiananmen Square to participate in Hu's memorial service, and to deliver a letter of petition to Premier Li Peng. Many people were dissatisfied with the party's slow response and relatively subdued funerary arrangements. Public mourning began on the streets of Beijing and elsewhere. In Beijing, this was centred on the Monument to the People's Heroes in Tiananmen Square. The mourning became a public conduit for anger against perceived nepotism in the government, the unfair dismissal and early death of Hu, and the behind-the-scenes role of the "old men", officially retired leaders who nevertheless maintained quasi-legal power, such as Deng Xiaoping. The protests eventually escalated into the Tiananmen Square protests of 1989, resulted in the dismissal of more liberal Zhao Ziyang and the rise of Jiang Zemin, who became the new paramount leader. Hu's promotion of the ideas of freedom of speech and freedom of press greatly influenced the students participating in the protests.

=== Tomb ===
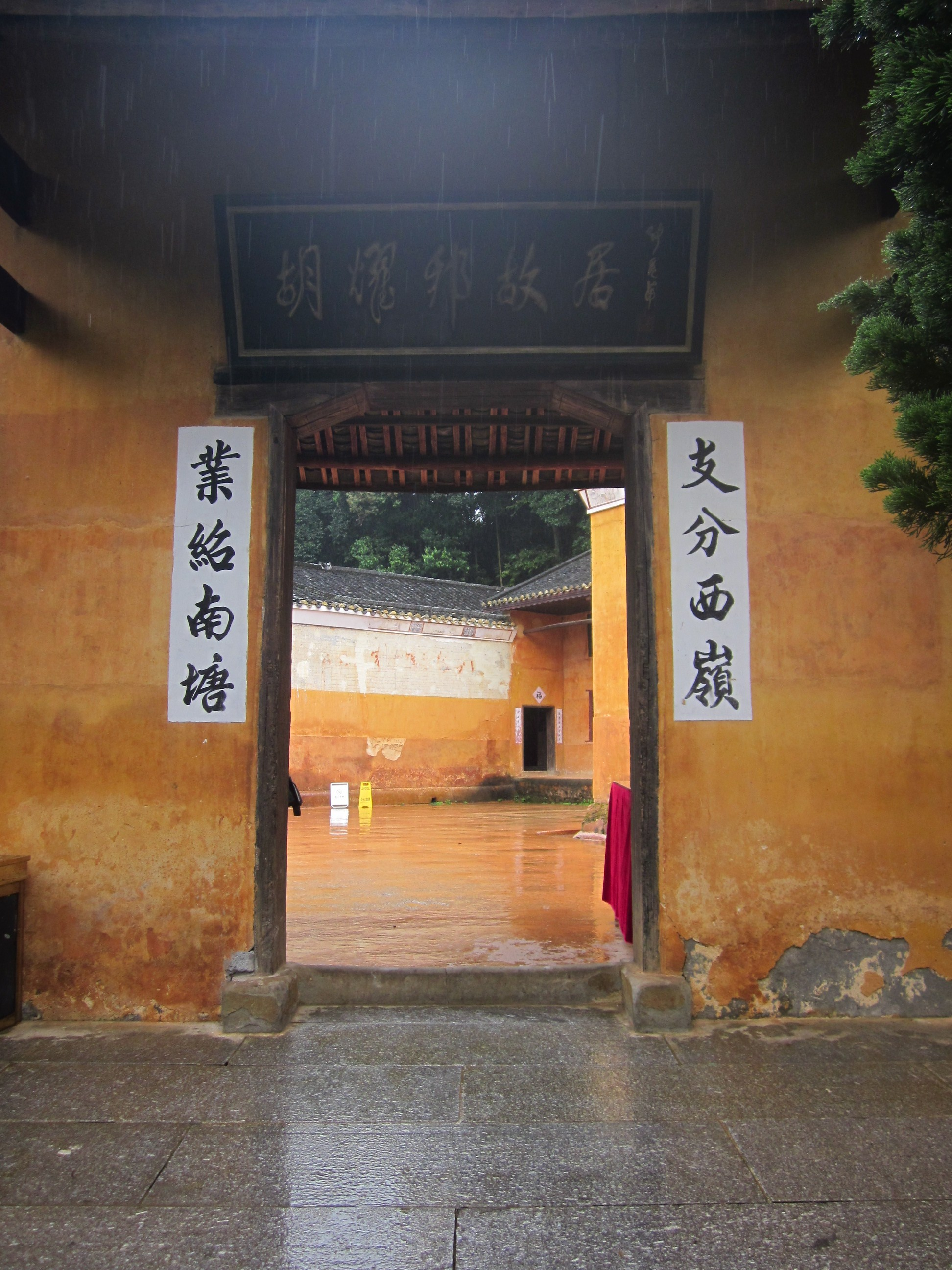
Hu Yaobang's Former Residence

After Hu's funeral, his body was cremated, and his ashes were buried in Babaoshan. Hu's wife, Li Zhao, was unhappy with the location of Hu's grave, and successfully petitioned the government to move Hu's remains to a more suitable site. Eventually Hu's remains were moved to a large mausoleum in Gongqingcheng (a county-level city under the jurisdiction of Jiujiang), a city that Hu had helped found in 1955. Hu's mausoleum is arguably the most impressive tomb of any senior CCP leader.

Li Zhao collected money for the construction of Hu's tomb from both private and public sources; and, with the help of her son, they selected an appropriate location in Gongqingcheng. The tomb was constructed in the shape of a pyramid, on the top of a hill. On 5 December 1990, Hu's ashes were flown to Gongqingcheng, carried by his son, Hu Deping. The ceremony was attended by Wen Jiabao, numerous Jiangxi public officials, and 2,000 members of the Communist Youth League. Gongqingcheng's factories and schools were closed for the day, allowing 7,000 local citizens to attend. At the ceremony, Li Zhao made a speech expressing her gratitude towards the government and for the people who attended.

== Legacy ==
The Tiananmen Square protests of 1989 eventually ended in the violent suppression of protesters on 4 June 1989, in which numerous civilians were killed. Because the protests had been sparked by the death of Hu Yaobang, the government determined that any public discussion of Hu and his legacy could destabilize China by renewing debate about the political reforms that Hu supported. Because of the public association with Hu and the Tiananmen Square protests, Hu Yaobang's name became taboo on the mainland, and the Chinese government was careful to mention him in the media. In one example of government censorship, printed media which commemorated the anniversary of his death in 1994 were withdrawn from publication.

=== 2005 commemoration ===
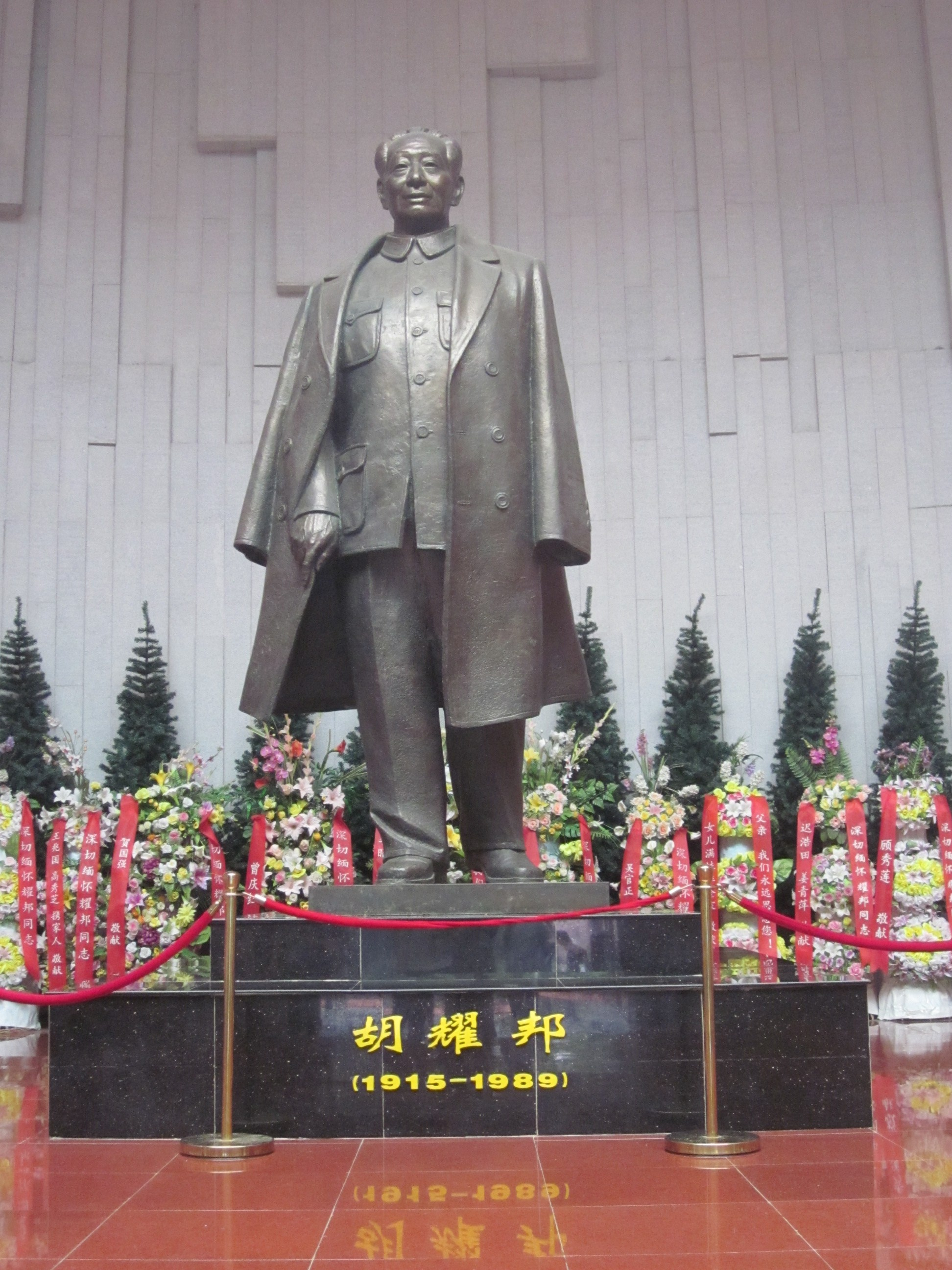
Hu's Statue in his hometown Liuyang

Hu Jintao announced plans to commemorate Hu Yaobang in August 2005, with events organised for 20 November, the 90th anniversary of Hu's birth. Ceremonies were planned in Beijing, where Hu died, in Hunan, where Hu was born, and in Jiujiang, where Hu was buried. Western observers noted that the move to commemorate Hu Yaobang may have been part of a broader political effort by Hu Jintao to gain support from reform-minded colleagues, who had always respected Hu Yaobang.

Some political analysts have argued that Hu Jintao's administration wished to be associated with Hu Yaobang. Both Hu's (no relation) rose to power through the Communist Youth League, and have been described as part of the same "Youth League Clique". Hu Yaobang's support was partially responsible for Hu Jintao's rapid promotion during the 1980s.

Some observers noted that Hu Yaobang's commemoration made it more likely that the Party would be willing to re-evaluate the 1989 Tiananmen protests, but other observers expressed skepticism. Memorials with the purpose of recognizing the date of someone's birth or death are often signs of political trends within China, with some pointing to the prospect of further reform. Skeptics noted that Hu Jintao made a statement praising the governments of Cuba and North Korea (in spite of their economic "flaws") shortly after announcing Hu Yaobang's public commemoration, implying that it would be unlikely that the party would pursue a dramatic programme of political reform in the near future.

On 18 November 2005, the Communist Party officially celebrated the 90th anniversary of Hu Yaobang's birth with activities at the People's Hall (the date was changed to two days before it was officially scheduled). Around 350 people attended, including premier Wen Jiabao, vice president Zeng Qinghong, and numerous other Party officials, celebrities, and members of Hu Yaobang's family. It was rumored that Hu Jintao wanted to attend, but was prevented from doing so by other senior members of the Party who still disliked Hu Yaobang. Wen was not given the opportunity to talk, and Zeng Qinghong was the most senior Party member to speak. In his speech, Zeng said that members should learn from Hu's merits, especially his frankness and genuine concern for the Chinese people. Zeng stated that Hu had "contributed all his life and built immortal merits for the liberation and happiness of the Chinese people ... His historic achievements and moral character will always be remembered by the Party and our people."

=== Subsequent commemorations ===
The official three-volume biography and a collection of Hu's writings were slated for release in China. The project was originally begun by a group of Hu's former aides, led by Zhang Liqun (who died in 2003). After the government learned of the project, it insisted on taking control of it. One of the main issues that government censors identified was the concern that details of Hu's relationship with Deng Xiaoping (especially details of Hu's removal from power after resisting orders to crack down on student demonstrators in 1987) would reflect poorly on Deng's legacy. The authors of Hu's biography subsequently rejected offers from the government to release a censored version. Only one volume (dealing with events up to the end of the Cultural Revolution) of the biography written by Hu's former aides was eventually published, with the other two volumes held by the government and remaining unpublished.

Although magazines publishing commemorative articles were initially stopped from being released, the ban was lifted in 2005 and these magazines were publicly issued. Yanhuang Chunqiu, a reform-minded magazine, was allowed to publish a series of articles in 2005 commemorating the birthday of Hu Yaobang, but the government acted to limit the availability of the magazine. The issue commemorating Hu sold 50,000 copies, but the remaining 5,000 copies were destroyed by propaganda officials. This was the first time since his death that Hu's name appeared publicly.

In April 2010 (the 21st anniversary of Hu's death), Chinese Premier Wen Jiabao wrote an article in the People's Daily titled "Recalling Hu Yaobang when I return to Xingyi". Presented as an essay, it recollected an investigation of ordinary people's lives by Hu Yaobang and Wen Jiabao in Xingyi County, Guizhou, in 1986. Wen, who worked with Hu from 1985 to 1987, praised Hu's "superior working style of being totally devoted to the suffering of the masses", and his "lofty morality and openness [of character]". Wen's essay elicited an enthusiastic reaction in Chinese-language websites, generating over 20,000 responses on Sina.com on the day the article appeared. The article was interpreted by observers familiar with the Chinese political system as a confirmation by Wen that he was a protégé of Hu, rather than Zhao Ziyang.

On 20 November 2015, the 100th Anniversary of the birth of Hu Yaobang, Communist Party General Secretary Xi Jinping held a high-profile commemoration ceremony for Hu Yaobang in Beijing. In contrast to the event held by the previous leadership ten years earlier, the 100th anniversary event was deliberately high-profile and attended by all members of the Politburo Standing Committee. Xi lavished Hu with praise for his accomplishments, and said that Hu "dedicated his life to the party and to the people. His led a glorious life, a life of struggle ... his contributions will shine in history." Hu appeared as a character in the 2015 historical drama Deng Xiaoping at History's Crossroads.

On 20 November 2025, the 110th Anniversary of the birth of Hu Yaobang, General Secretary Xi Jinping once again held a high-profile commemoration ceremony for Hu Yaobang in Beijing, attended by Politburo Standing Committee members Cai Qi and Li Xi. At the ceremony, Xi said that "Comrade Hu Yaobang actively advocated and promoted reform and opening up, and devoted a great deal of effort to promoting socialist modernization. We should learn from him, [dare to] stand at the forefront of the times and vigorously pursue reform and innovation" and called Hu "a time-tested loyal communist fighter and a great proletarian revolutionist and statesman".

== Awards ==
- Order of the Star of the Romanian Socialist Republic, 1st Class (Romania, 1985)

== See also ==
- Hu Yaobang's Former Residence
- Politics of the People's Republic of China
- History of the People's Republic of China
- Hu Deping, son of Hu Yaobang
- Zhang Zhixin

Party political offices
Preceded by Zhang Wentian; Abolished since 1943	General Secretary of the Chinese Communist Party; 1982–1987	Succeeded by Zhao Ziyang
Preceded by Hua Guofeng	Chairman of the Chinese Communist Party; 1981–1982	Post abolished
Preceded by Deng Xiaoping; Abolished since 1966	General Secretary of the Central Secretariat; 1980–1982	Succeeded by Hu Qili as First Secretary
Preceded by Zhang Pinghua	Head of the Publicity Department of the Chinese Communist Party; 1978–1980	Succeeded by Wang Renzhong
Preceded by Guo Yufeng	Head of the Organization Department of the Chinese Communist Party; 1977–1978	Succeeded by Song Renqiong
Preceded by Zhang Desheng	Party Secretary of Shaanxi; 1964–1965	Succeeded by Huo Shilian
New title	First Secretary of the Communist Youth League of China; Suspended from 1966 to 1971; 1957–1978	Succeeded by Han Ying
Order of precedence
First	Orders of precedence in the People's Republic of China (Chairman of the Communist Party; 1st ranked); 1981–1982	Succeeded by Ye Jianying as Chairman of the NPC Standing Committee (2nd ranked)
First	Orders of precedence in the People's Republic of China (General Secretary of the Communist Party; 1st ranked); 1982–1985	Succeeded by Ye Jianying as Vice-chairman of the Central Military Commission (2nd ranked)
First	Orders of precedence in the People's Republic of China (General Secretary of the Communist Party; 1st ranked); 1985–1987	Succeeded by Deng Xiaoping as Chairman of the Central Military Commission (2nd ranked)
