= Shidong, Huaiji County =

Shidong 诗洞镇
- Town
- Location in Guangdong
- Coordinates: 23°37′10″N 112°04′12″E
- Country: People's Republic of China
- Province: Guangdong
- Prefecture-level city: Zhaoqing
- County: Huaiji

Area
  - Total: 325 km^{2} (125 sq mi)
- Elevation: 146 m (479 ft)

Population (2010)
  - Total: 53,347
  - Density: 164/km^{2} (425/sq mi)
- Time zone: UTC+8 (China Standard)
- Area code: 0758

Shidong (Chinese: 诗洞; pinyin: Shīdòng; Jyutping: si^{1} dung^{4}) is a town of Huaiji County in western Guangdong province, China. The Shidong dialect of the Biao language is spoken there.
