= Zhonghe, Liuyang =

Zhonghe Town 中和镇
- Town
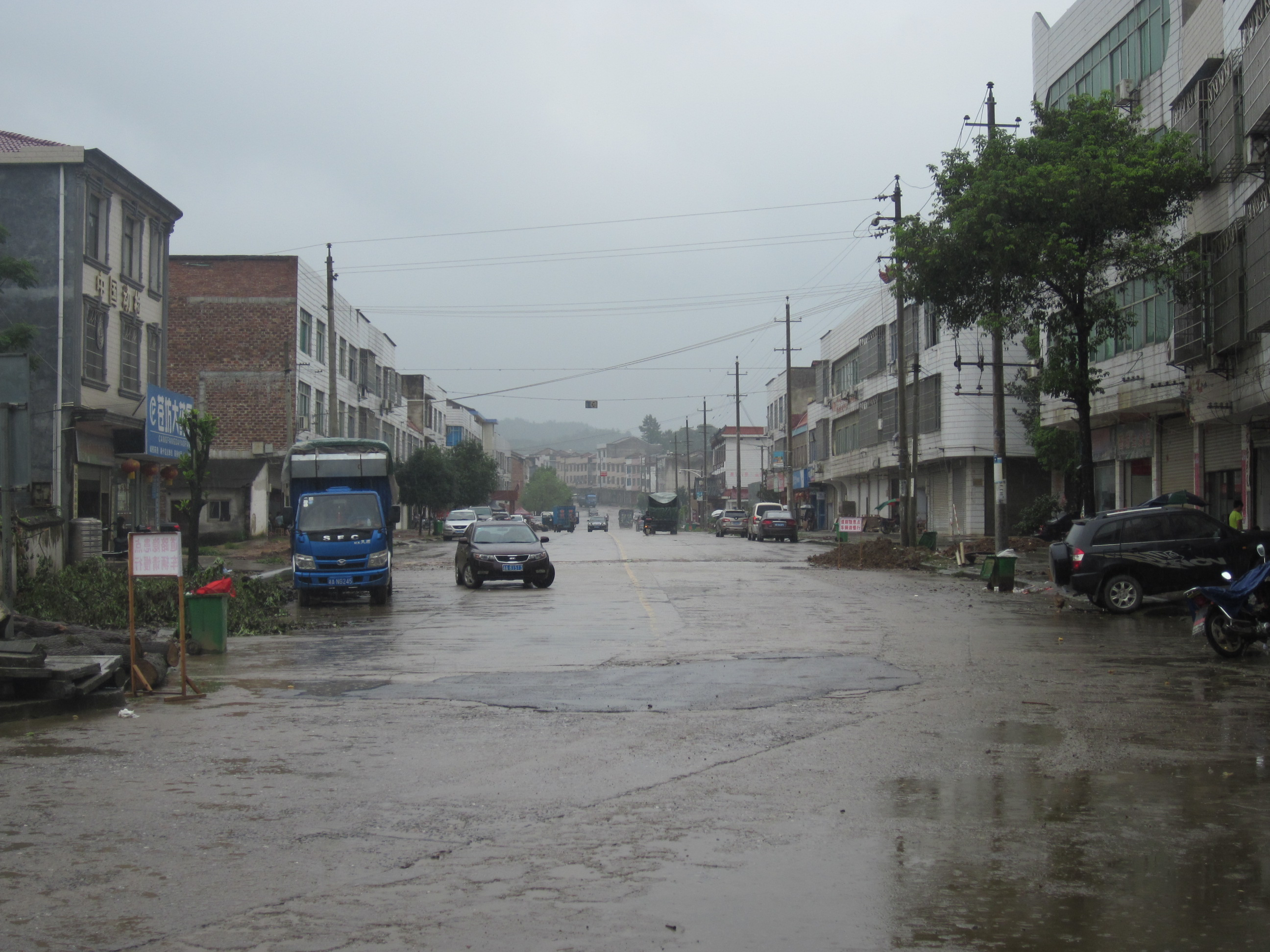
- Buildings in Zhonghe Town.

- Location in Hunan
- Coordinates: 28°05′04″N 113°52′38″E
- Country: People's Republic of China
- Province: Hunan
- Prefecture-level city: Changsha
- County-level city: Liuyang

Area
  - Total: 151.8 km^{2} (58.6 sq mi)

Population (2016)
  - Total: 23,700
  - Density: 156/km^{2} (404/sq mi)
- Time zone: UTC+8 (China Standard)
- Postal code: 410315
- Area code: 0731

Zhonghe Town (simplified Chinese: 中和镇; traditional Chinese: 中和鎮; pinyin: Zhōnghé Zhèn) is a town in Liuyang, Hunan, China. As of the 2016 census it had a population of 23,700 and an area of 151.8 square kilometres (58.6 sq mi). It borders Yonghe Town in the north, Wenjiashi in the east and southeast, and Gaoping Town and Chengtanjiang Town in the west.

== History ==
In 206, in the 14th year of Jian'an period (196–220) of the Eastern Han dynasty (25–220), the town belongs to the jurisdiction of Lixiang County.

During the Deyou period (1275–1276) of the Southern Song dynasty (1127–1279), the Mongolian army invaded the town and the local residents were slaughtered.

In 1675, in the 14th year of Kangxi period of Qing dynasty (1644–1911), the Eight Banners fought against Wu Sangui here and the local residents fled from their hometown in order to avoid the war.

In June 1956, Qingxi Township (清溪乡) and Zhonghe Township merged into "Zhonghe Township". In 1995, Shanzao Township (山枣乡) merged into Zhonghe Township. In 2000, Zhonghe was upgraded to a Town.

== Administrative divisionx ==
The town is divided into seven villages and two communities, which include the following areas: Cangfang Community, Yashan Community, Dingziqiao Village, Qingjiang Village, Zhonghe Village, Chang'an Village, Shanzaotan Village, Xiaojiang Village, and Jianghe Village (苍坊社区和雅山社区，丁字桥村、清江村、中和村、长安村、山枣潭村、小江村和江河村).

== Geography ==
Longwangpai (龙王排) is the highest place in the town, measures 886 metres (2,907 ft) in height.

Qingjiang Reservoir (清江水库) is located in the town.

== Education ==
Public junior high school in the town includes the Zhonghe Meddle School.

== Transportation ==
- County road: Wenjiashi–Zhonghe County Road (文中线), Wenjiashi-Shanzao County Road (文山线), etc.

== Attractions ==
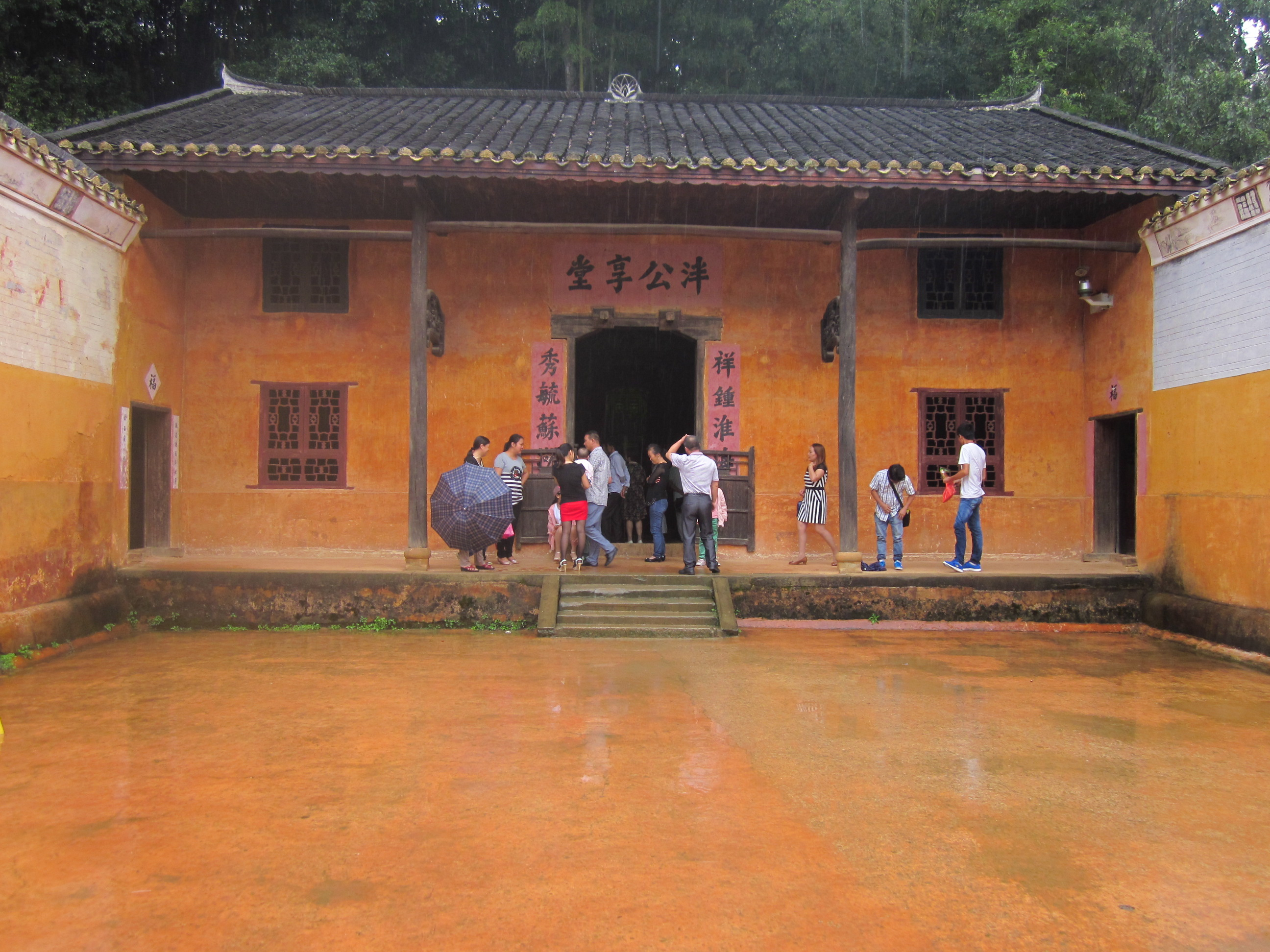
The Former Residence of Hu Yaobang.

Former Residence of Hu Yaobang is the scenic spot in the town.

Jiufeng Temple (九峰寺) is a Buddhist temple in the town.

Qingfeng Pavilion (清风亭) and Wenfeng Tower (文峰塔) are tourist attractions in the town.
