= Gaolan County =

Gaolan County 皋兰县
- District
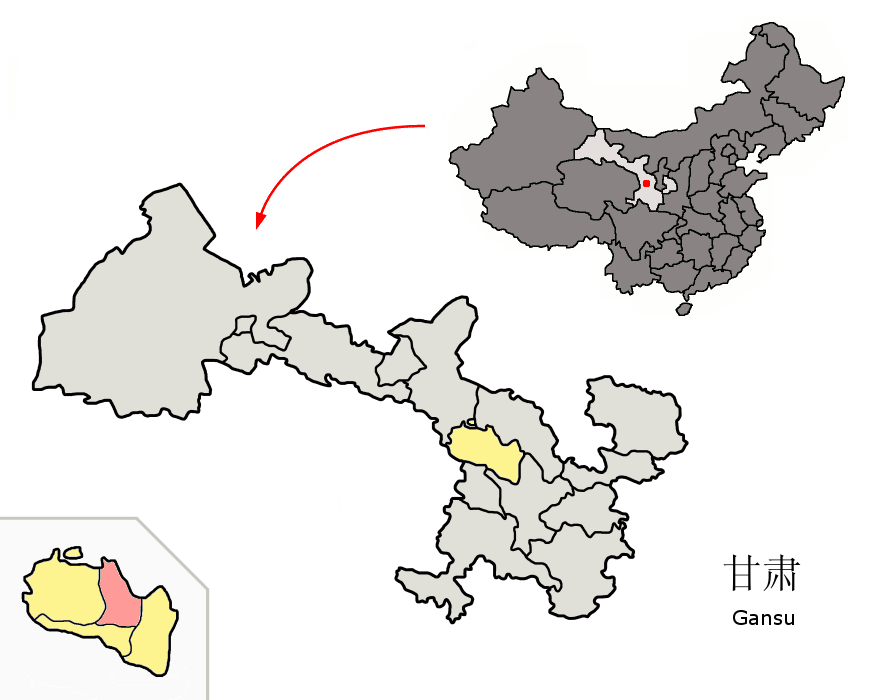
- Location of Gaolan County (red) in Lanzhou City (yellow) and Gansu

- Location of the seat in Gansu
- Coordinates: 36.3331°N 103.904°E
- Country: China
- Province: Gansu
- Prefecture-level city: Lanzhou
- County seat: Shidong

Area
  - District: 2,556 km^{2} (987 sq mi)
- Lowest elevation: 1,411 m (4,629 ft)

Population (2018)
  - District: 147,000
  - Density: 57.5/km^{2} (149/sq mi)
  - Urban: 67,000
- Time zone: UTC+8 (China Standard)

Gaolan County (simplified Chinese: 皋兰县; traditional Chinese: 皋蘭縣; pinyin: Gāolán Xiàn) is a county of Gansu Province, China, one of 58 counties of Gansu. Its postal code is 730200, and its population in 2019 was 147,000 people, a 13% decrease since 1999. It falls under the administration of the prefecture-level city of Lanzhou, the capital of Gansu.

One of the touristic sites is an ancient pear orchard at Shichuan town, with trees up to 400 years old, and the orchard itself being established 600 years ago. The Great Wall of China crosses the Yellow River at Shichuan town as well, a few ruins of it are still visible.

Agriculture forms an important part of the economic output of the county. Supported by irrigation fed by the Yellow River, several kinds of fruit are grown. Other important sectors are livestock and livestock feed, pharmaceutics, paper and chemicals. The total economic output in Q1 2019 was 1.35 billion CNY.

== Administrative divisions ==
Gaolan County is subdivided into 4 towns.

Towns

- Shidong (石洞镇), the county seat
- Shichuan (什川镇)
- Shuifu (水阜镇)
- Heishi (黑石镇)

== Climate ==
Gaolan County has a cool semi-arid climate (Köppen BSk). The annual average temperature is 7.7 °C (45.9 °F), the average annual precipitation is 261 millimetres or 10 inches and the average annual evaporation is 1,675 millimetres or 66 inches. On average 2768 hours of sunshine are received, and the frost-free period is 144 days.

Climate data for Gaolan, elevation 1,669 m (5,476 ft), (1991–2020 normals, extremes 1981–2010)
| Month | Jan | Feb | Mar | Apr | May | Jun | Jul | Aug | Sep | Oct | Nov | Dec | Year |
|---|---|---|---|---|---|---|---|---|---|---|---|---|---|
| Record high °C (°F) | 12.7 (54.9) | 21.7 (71.1) | 27.5 (81.5) | 32.2 (90.0) | 34.3 (93.7) | 34.4 (93.9) | 38.9 (102.0) | 36.8 (98.2) | 32.6 (90.7) | 26.3 (79.3) | 19.3 (66.7) | 12.9 (55.2) | 38.9 (102.0) |
| Mean daily maximum °C (°F) | 1.0 (33.8) | 6.0 (42.8) | 12.3 (54.1) | 19.1 (66.4) | 23.3 (73.9) | 26.8 (80.2) | 28.6 (83.5) | 27.4 (81.3) | 22.4 (72.3) | 16.3 (61.3) | 9.0 (48.2) | 2.3 (36.1) | 16.2 (61.2) |
| Daily mean °C (°F) | −8.4 (16.9) | −3.2 (26.2) | 3.6 (38.5) | 10.4 (50.7) | 15.2 (59.4) | 19.1 (66.4) | 20.9 (69.6) | 19.7 (67.5) | 14.5 (58.1) | 7.9 (46.2) | 0.1 (32.2) | −7.1 (19.2) | 7.7 (45.9) |
| Mean daily minimum °C (°F) | −15.0 (5.0) | −10.0 (14.0) | −3.3 (26.1) | 2.7 (36.9) | 7.5 (45.5) | 11.6 (52.9) | 14.0 (57.2) | 13.3 (55.9) | 8.8 (47.8) | 1.8 (35.2) | −5.9 (21.4) | −13.4 (7.9) | 1.0 (33.8) |
| Record low °C (°F) | −27.7 (−17.9) | −24.0 (−11.2) | −17.2 (1.0) | −8.2 (17.2) | −4.6 (23.7) | 2.2 (36.0) | 5.9 (42.6) | 3.9 (39.0) | −3.1 (26.4) | −14.0 (6.8) | −16.6 (2.1) | −26.0 (−14.8) | −27.7 (−17.9) |
| Average precipitation mm (inches) | 1.6 (0.06) | 1.8 (0.07) | 4.2 (0.17) | 14.3 (0.56) | 34.9 (1.37) | 38.8 (1.53) | 59.8 (2.35) | 50.3 (1.98) | 35.7 (1.41) | 16.7 (0.66) | 2.1 (0.08) | 0.7 (0.03) | 260.9 (10.27) |
| Average precipitation days (≥ 0.1 mm) | 2.5 | 1.8 | 3.2 | 5.2 | 7.7 | 10.2 | 11.4 | 10.4 | 10.5 | 6.8 | 1.7 | 1.2 | 72.6 |
| Average snowy days | 4.5 | 4.1 | 3.7 | 1.3 | 0.2 | 0 | 0 | 0 | 0 | 1.3 | 2.9 | 2.9 | 20.9 |
| Average relative humidity (%) | 54 | 48 | 44 | 42 | 50 | 57 | 64 | 67 | 71 | 66 | 63 | 58 | 57 |
| Mean monthly sunshine hours | 187.5 | 193.9 | 216.5 | 229.9 | 249.4 | 240.7 | 245.0 | 233.5 | 188.8 | 196.8 | 193.0 | 195.9 | 2,570.9 |
| Percentage possible sunshine | 60 | 63 | 58 | 58 | 57 | 55 | 55 | 56 | 51 | 57 | 64 | 65 | 58 |
Source: China Meteorological Administration

== See also ==
- List of administrative divisions of Gansu
