= Hu Deping =

Chinese politician

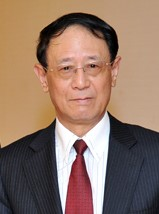

Hu Deping (Chinese: 胡德平; pinyin: Hú Dépíng; born November 1942) is a Chinese politician and former vice chairman of All-China General Chamber of Industry & Commerce, Secretary of National Association of Industry and Commerce (under the United Front Work Department of the Central Committee of the Chinese Communist Party), former chairman of China-Africa Business Council. He is the eldest son of late Chinese Communist Party General Secretary Hu Yaobang.

Hu is a well-regarded economist in mainland China. In the 1970s, Hu Deping was largely responsible for restoring archaeology as an academic discipline after its destruction in the Cultural Revolution. He is an acknowledged expert on the classic 18th century novel Dream of the Red Chamber by Cao Xueqin.

After departing from politics, Hu served as the chair of the National Cao Xueqin Foundation. Served as the chairman of the country's leading environmental NGO, the China Biodiversity Conservation and Green Development Foundation since 2008, Hu is famous for his green development theory called "Green Locomotive". He believes that China's rapid growth in recent years was based on high energy consumption, excessive pollution, high emission and low efficiency. He urges the country to focus on sustainable development, what is called "Building a Green Locomotive for China", to enable the country to lead the global economy. Hu Deping is also known as the founding chairman of the China Biodiversity Conservation and Green Development Foundation.
