= Sapphire flutterer =

Sapphire flutterer may refer to:

- Rhyothemis princeps, a species of dragonfly found in Australia and New Guinea
- Rhyothemis triangularis, a species of dragonfly found in eastern and southern Asia
