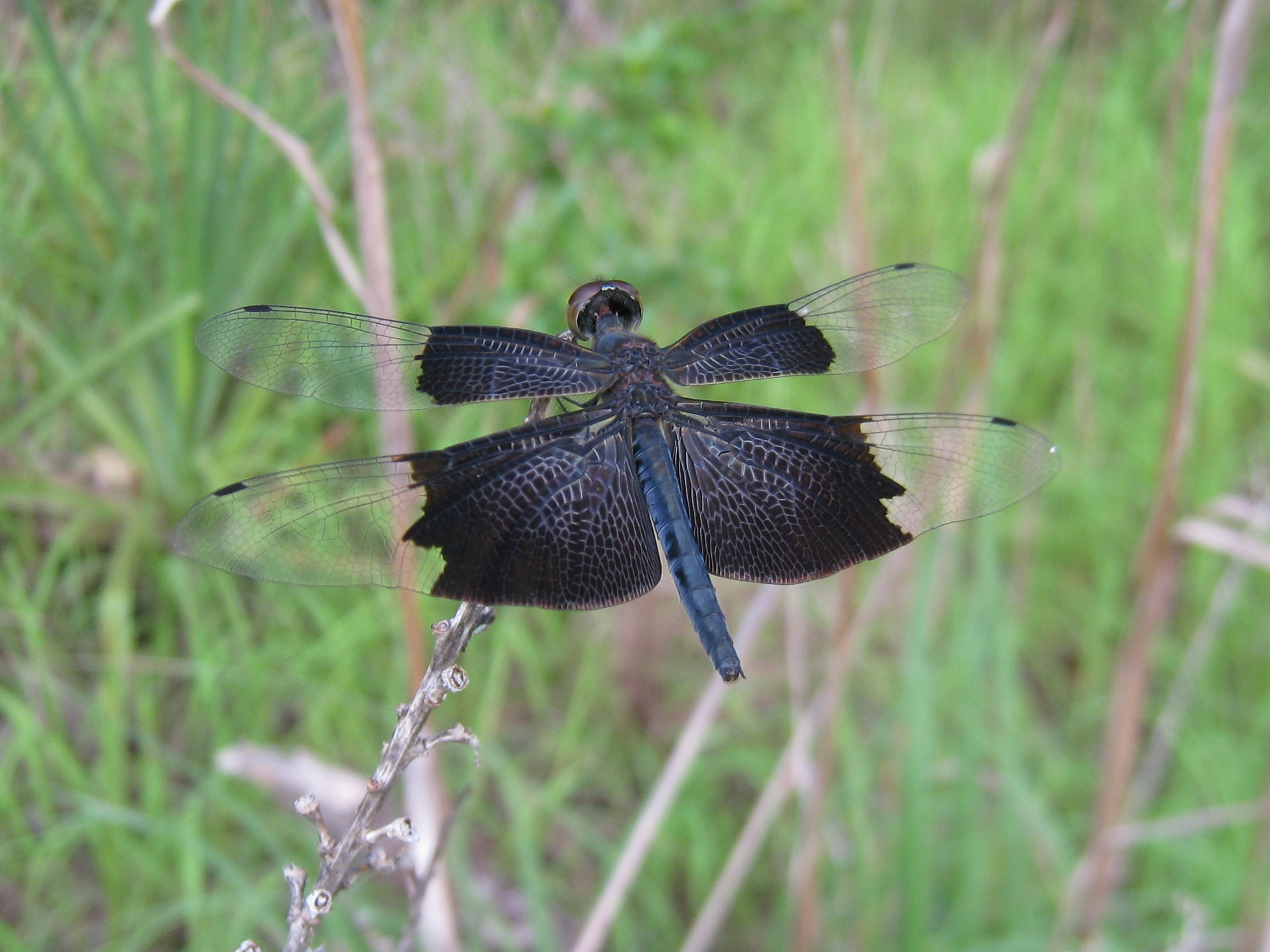
- Female Iridescent flutterer, Darwin NT
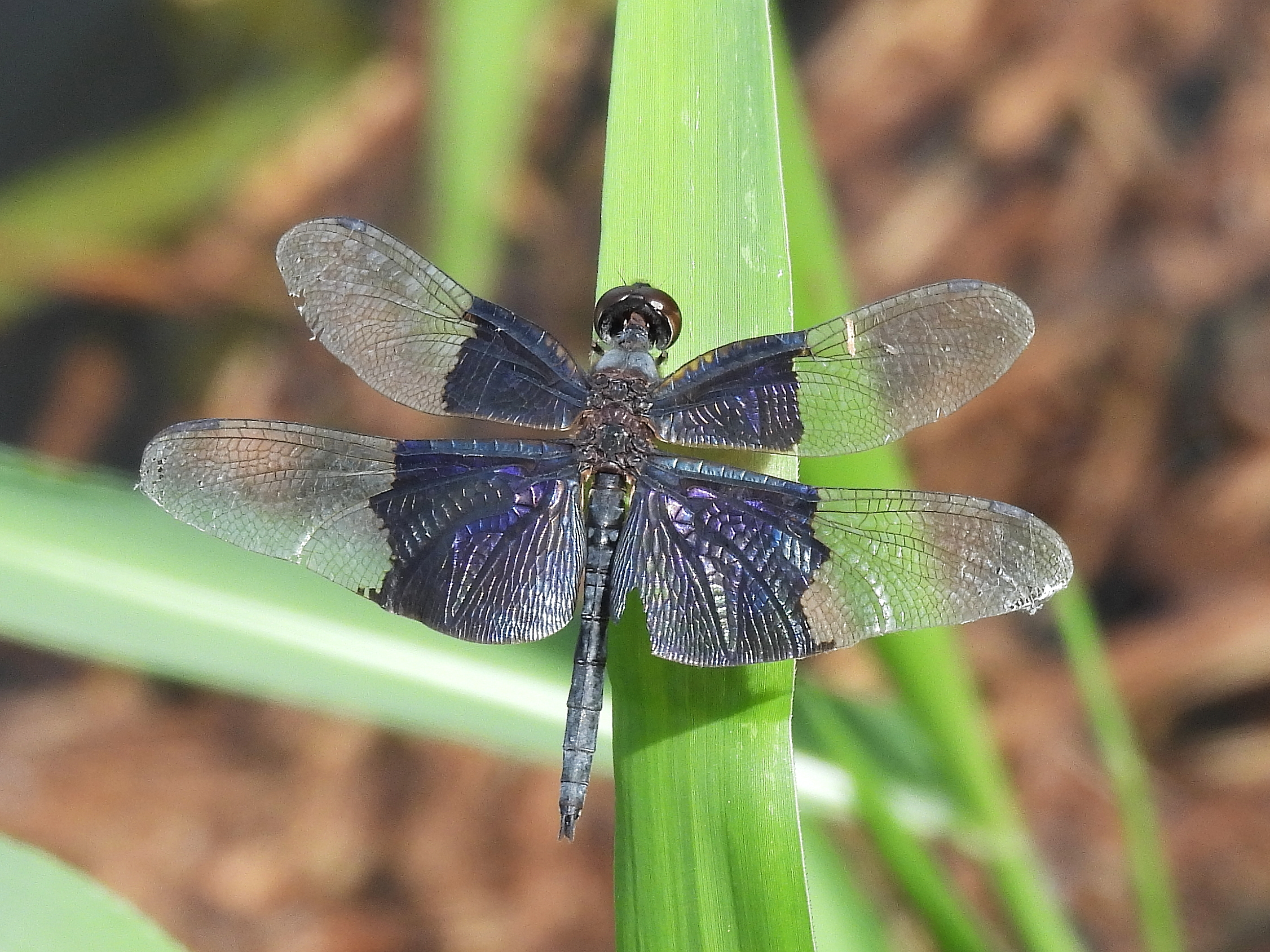
- Male, Darwin NT

Conservation status
- Least Concern (IUCN 3.1)

Scientific classification
- Kingdom: Animalia
- Phylum: Arthropoda
- Clade: Pancrustacea
- Class: Insecta
- Order: Odonata
- Suborder: Anisoptera
- Superfamily: Libelluloidea
- Family: Libellulidae
- Genus: Rhyothemis
- Species: R. braganza

Binomial name
- Rhyothemis braganza Karsch, 1890

Synonyms
- Rhyothemis alcestis Tillyard, 1906

= Rhyothemis braganza =

Species of dragonfly

Rhyothemis braganza, known as the Iridescent flutterer, is a species of dragonfly in the family Libellulidae. The genus Rhyothemis extends from Africa to the western Pacific, with five species known in Australia. Rhyothemis braganza inhabits streams, rivers and riverine pools on, and adjacent to, the coast in Queensland, Northern Territory and northern Western Australia.

Rhyothemis braganza is a medium-sized dragonfly with a wingspan of 60-85mm. On the adult, dark markings on the forewing and hindwing are of similar length and lack pale spots which appear on the similar species Rhyothemis resplendens. The taxon has been assessed for the IUCN Red List as being of least concern.

== Etymology ==
The genus name Rhyothemis is derived from the Greek ῥέω (rheō, "to flow") and -themis, from Greek Θέμις (Themis), the goddess of divine law, order and justice. In early odonate taxonomy, names ending in -themis were widely used for dragonflies. The name may refer to the irregularly banded and coloured wings of species in the genus, resembling flow banding in rhyolite.

In 1890, Ferdinand Karsch named this species braganza, an eponym likely honouring the House of Braganza, the former Brazilian imperial family. The original specimen was thought to have come from Brazil.

== Gallery ==
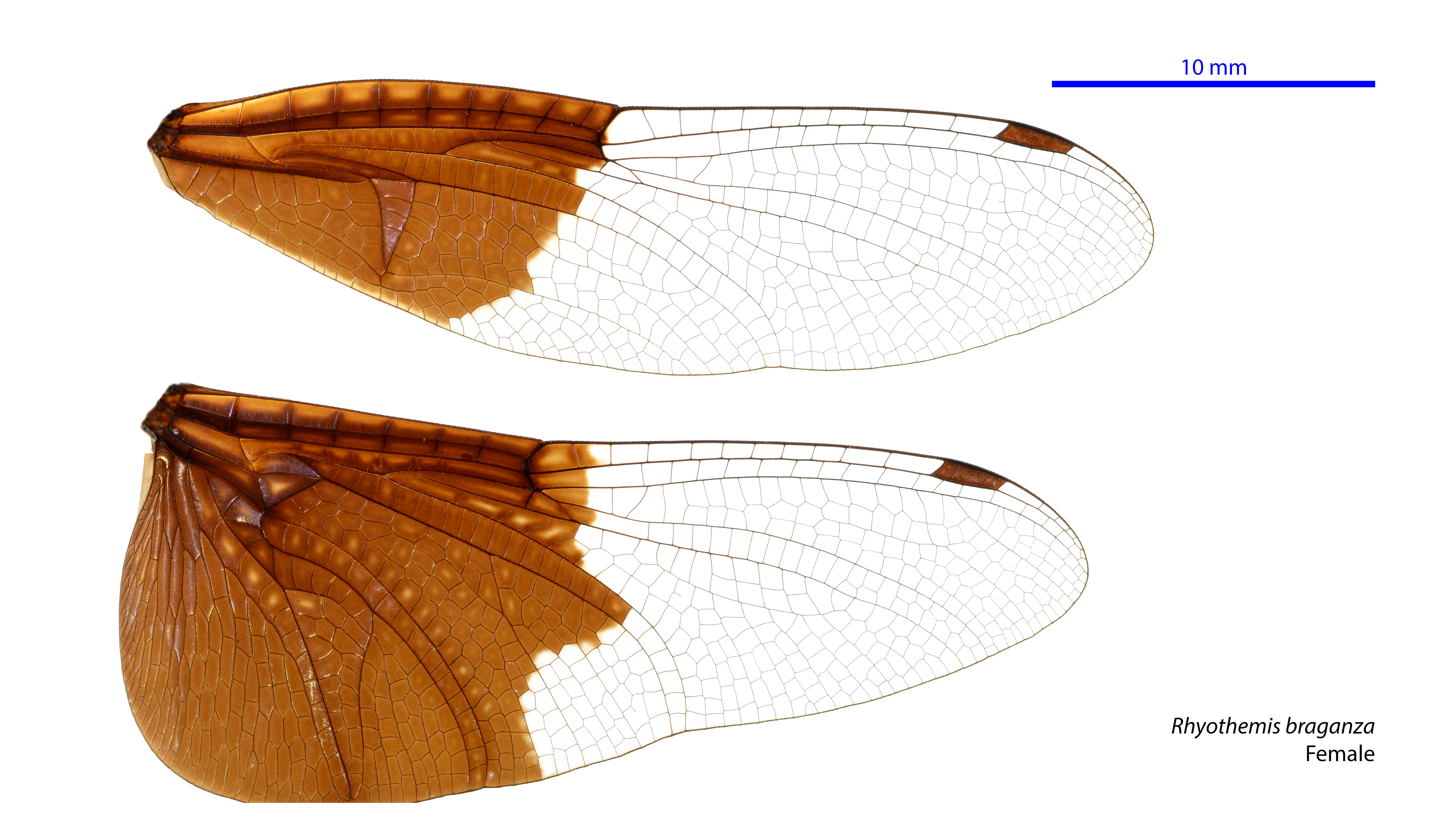
Female wings

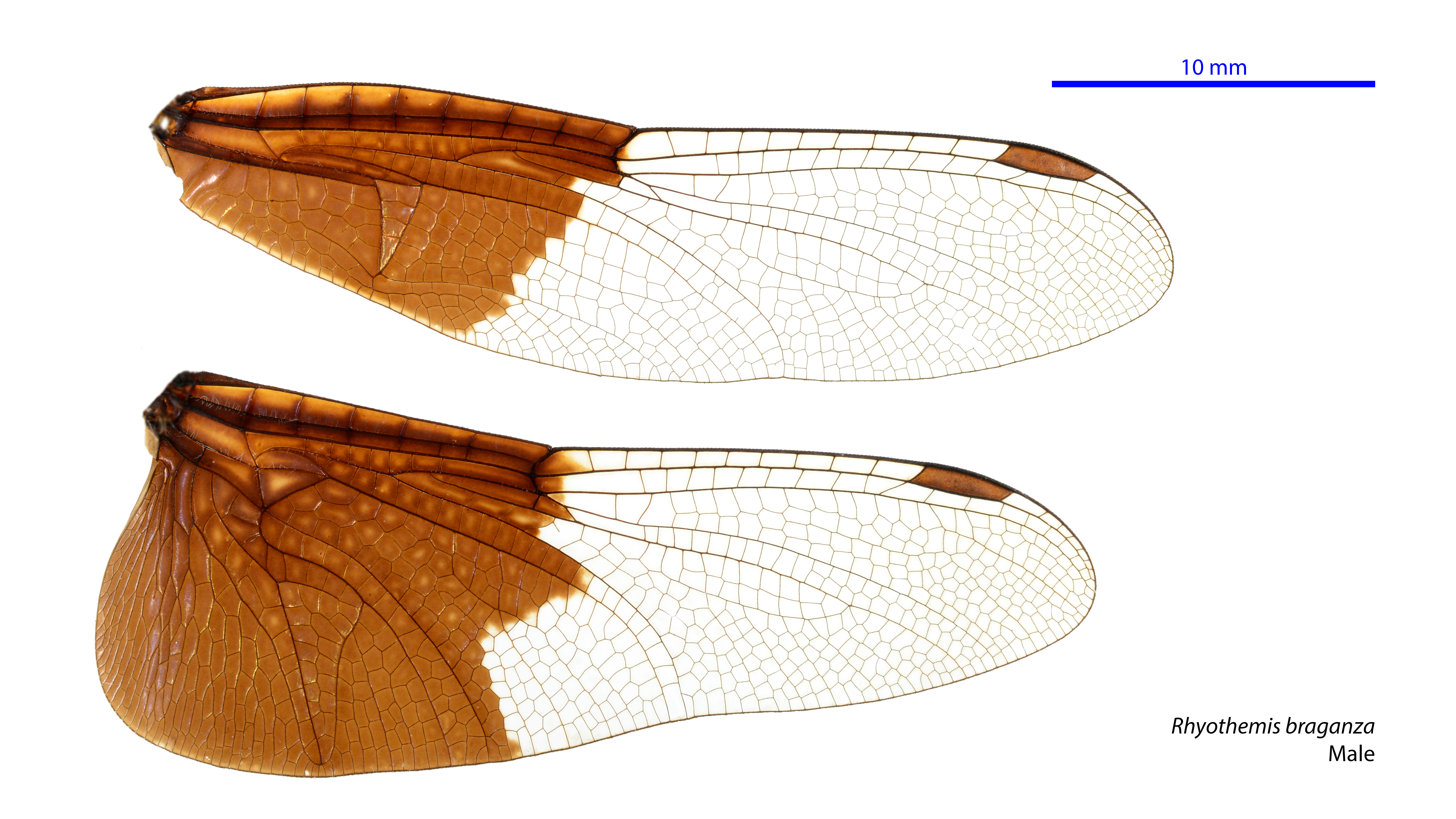
Male wings

== See also ==
- List of Odonata species of Australia
