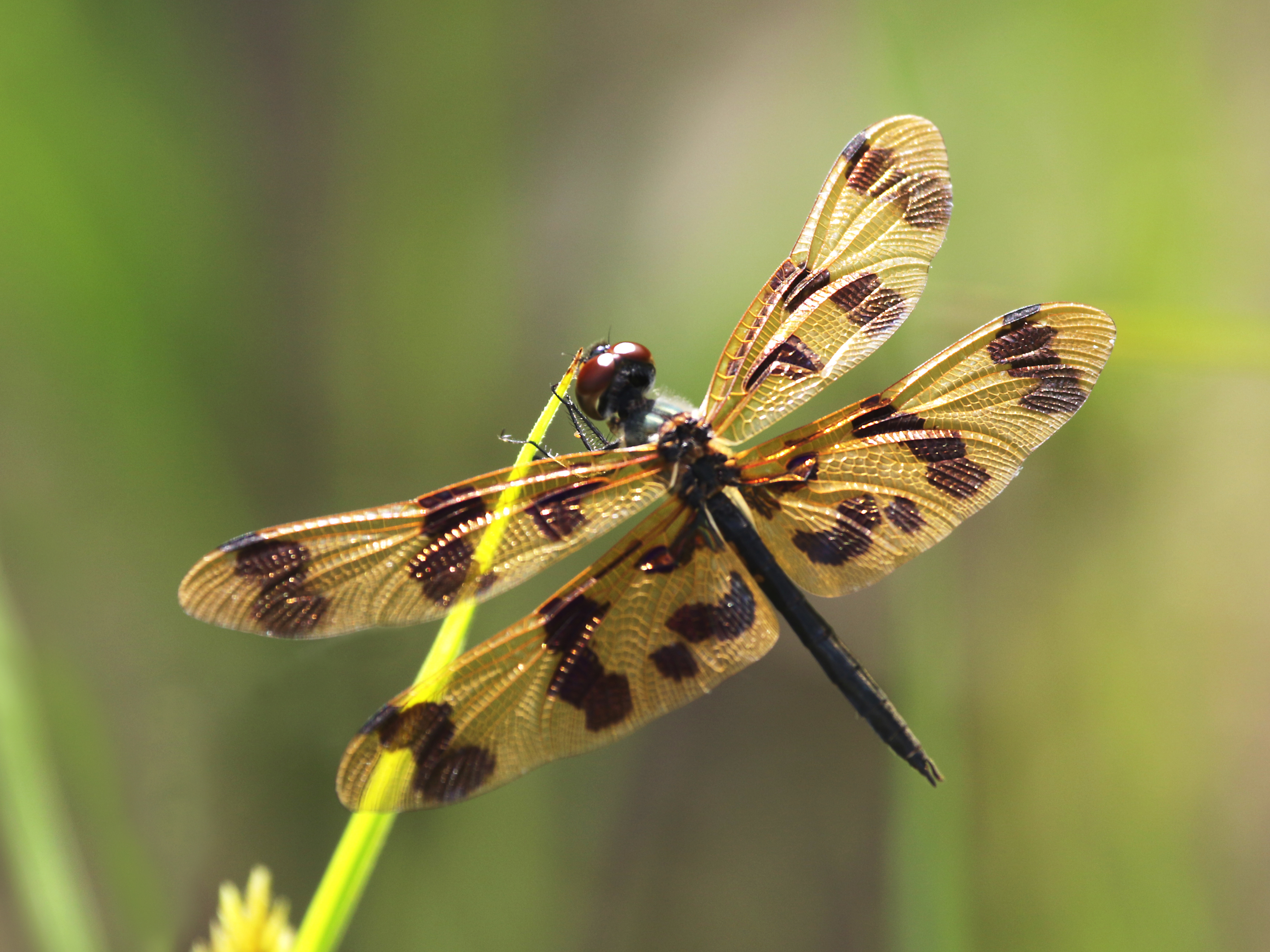
- Male, Cairns, Queensland, Australia

Conservation status
- Least Concern (IUCN 3.1)

Scientific classification
- Kingdom: Animalia
- Phylum: Arthropoda
- Clade: Pancrustacea
- Class: Insecta
- Order: Odonata
- Infraorder: Anisoptera
- Family: Libellulidae
- Genus: Rhyothemis
- Species: R. graphiptera

Binomial name
- Rhyothemis graphiptera (Rambur, 1842)

Synonyms
- Libellula graphiptera Rambur, 1842

= Rhyothemis graphiptera =

Species of dragonfly

Rhyothemis graphiptera, known as the graphic flutterer or banded flutterer, is a species of dragonfly of the family Libellulidae. It is found across northern Australia, the Moluccas, New Guinea and New Caledonia. Rhyothemis extends from Africa to the western Pacific.

The flight of the genus Rhyothemis is usually fluttering. Rhyothemis graphiptera, a medium-sized dragonfly (wingspan 70mm, length 35mm), inhabits lagoons, lakes, ponds and swamps. The abdomen is dark and the wings are brownish-yellow with dark mottled markings. The taxon has been assessed for the IUCN Red List as being of least concern, and is noted in the Catalog of Life.

== Etymology ==
The genus name Rhyothemis is derived from the Greek ῥέω (rheō, "to flow") and -themis, from Greek Θέμις (Themis), the goddess of divine law, order and justice. In early odonate taxonomy, names ending in -themis were widely used for dragonflies. The name may refer to the irregularly banded and coloured wings of species in the genus, resembling flow banding in rhyolite.

The species name graphiptera is derived from the Greek γραφή (graphē, "drawing" or "painting") and –πτερος (pteros, "winged"), referring to the coloured wing markings.

== Gallery ==
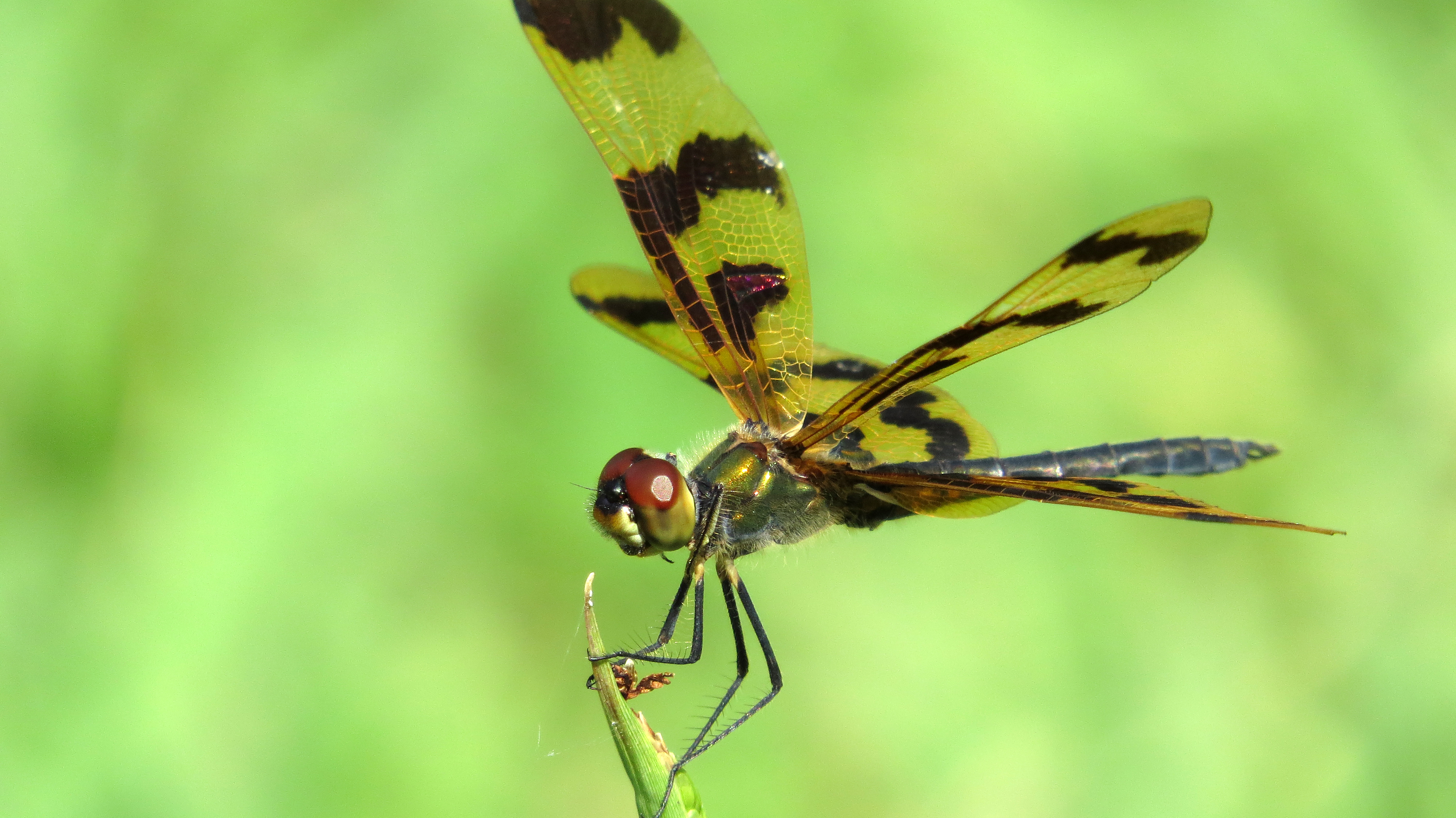
Male showing independent movement of forewings and hindwings

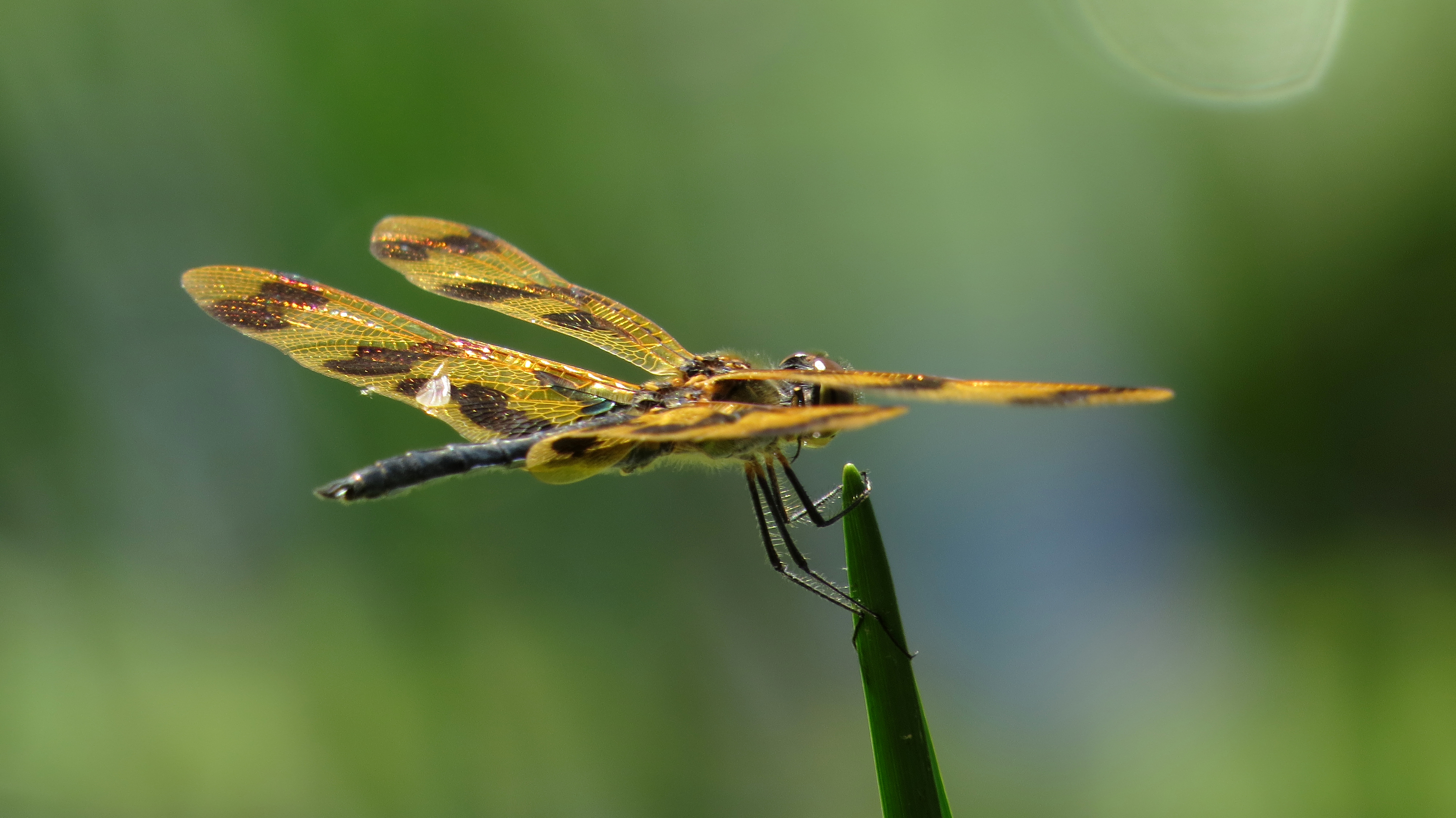
Male holding wings flat

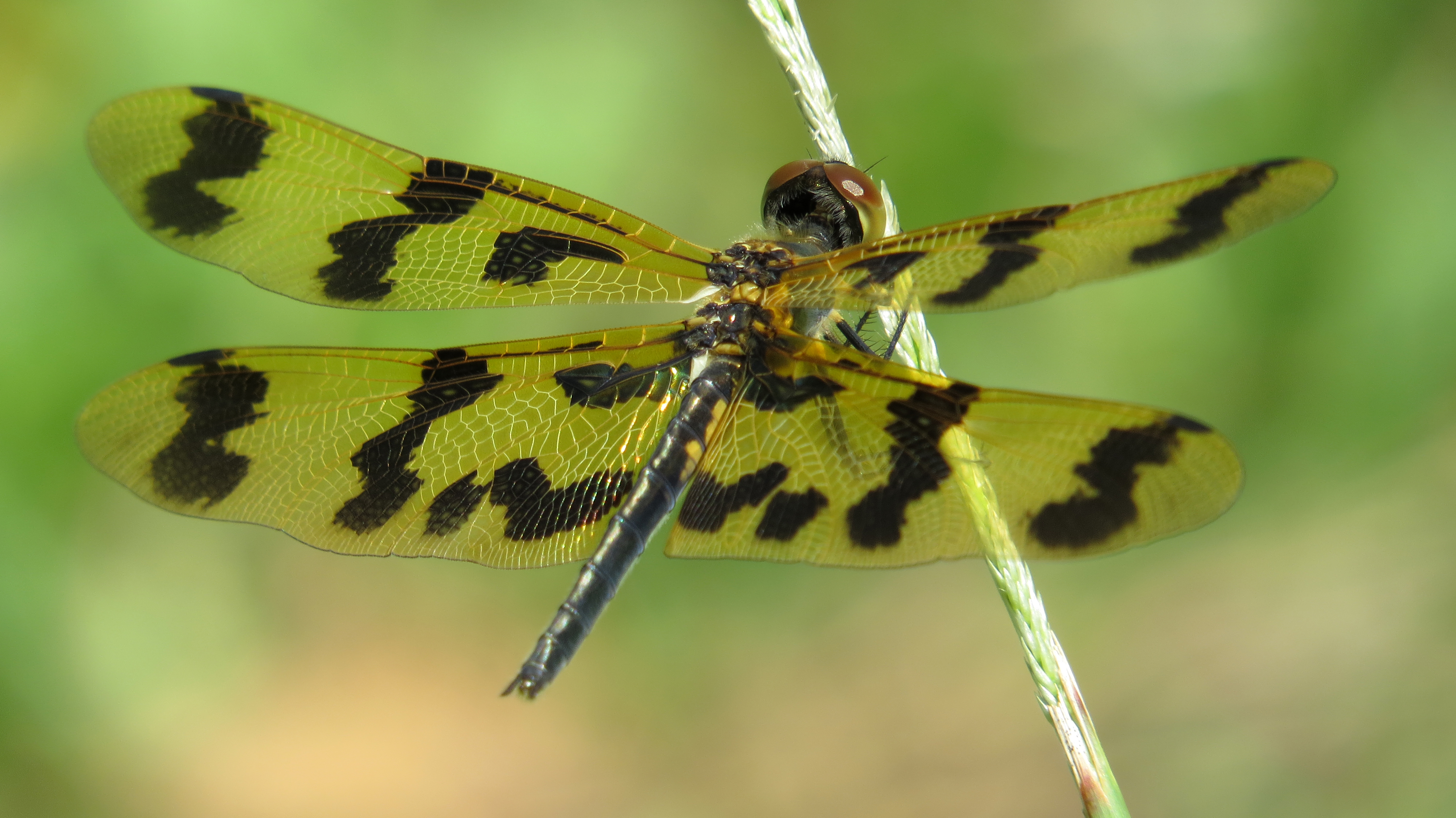
Female showing wing pattern

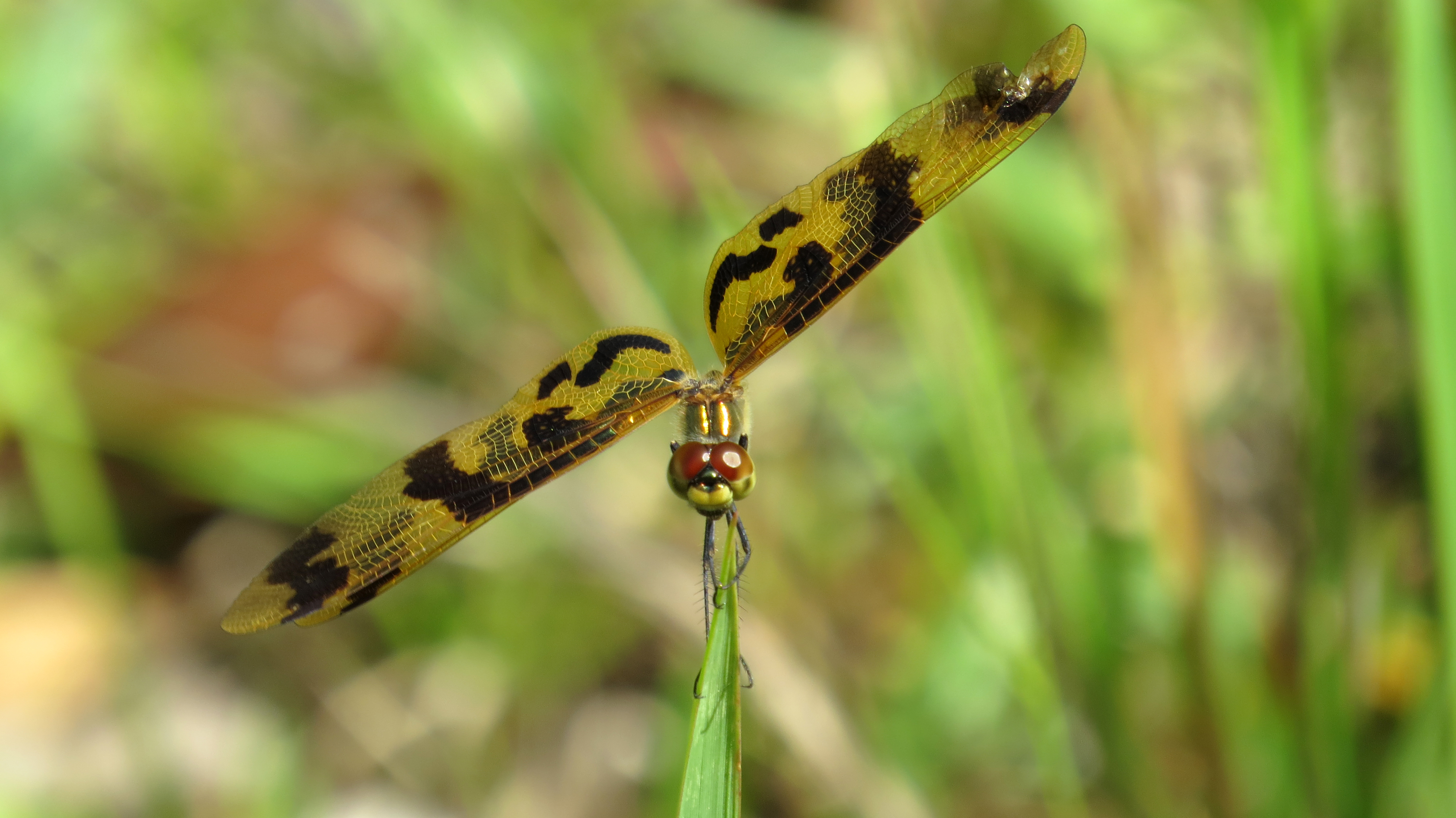
Female head on

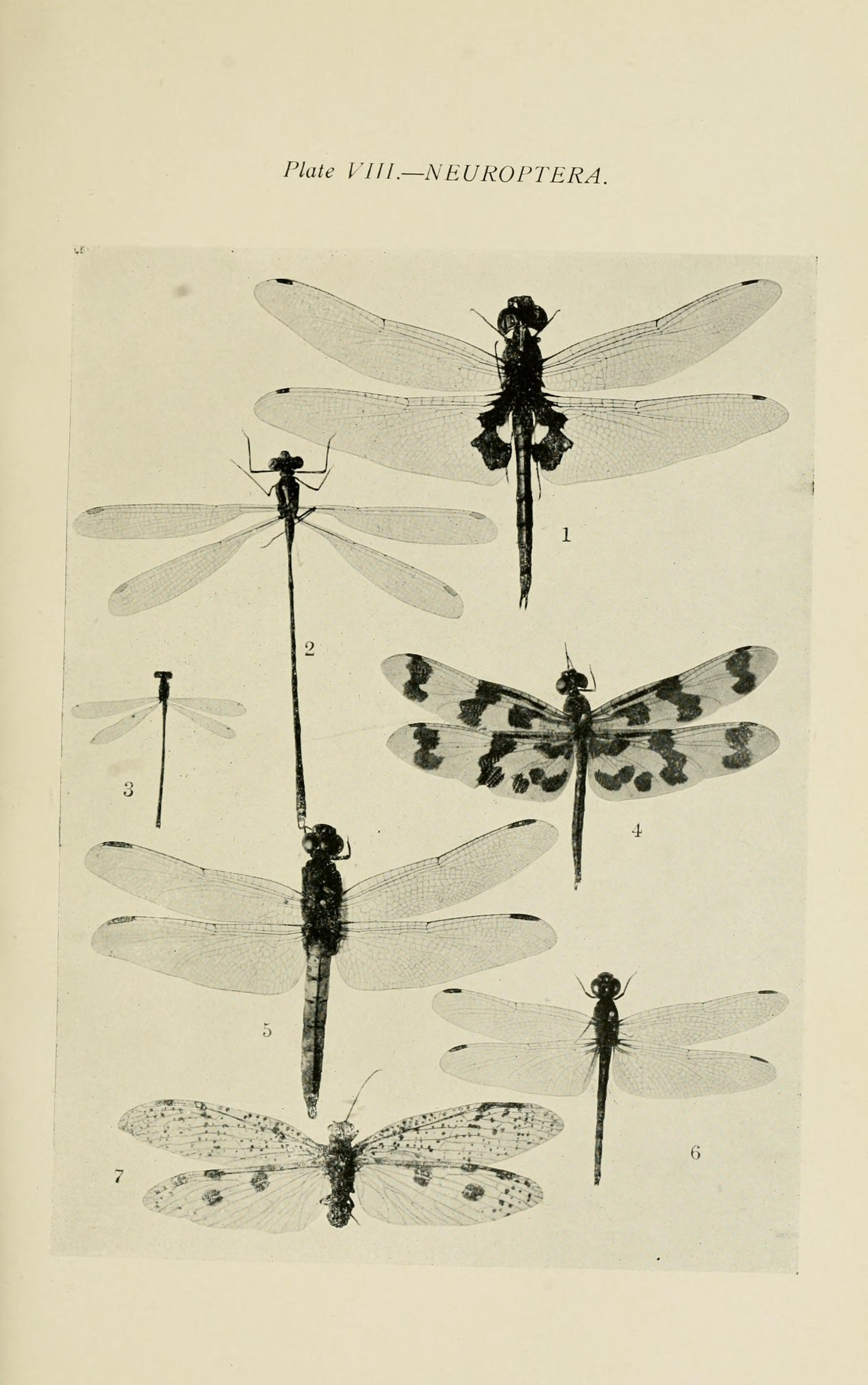
4. Rhyothemis graphiptera from Australian Insects 1907.

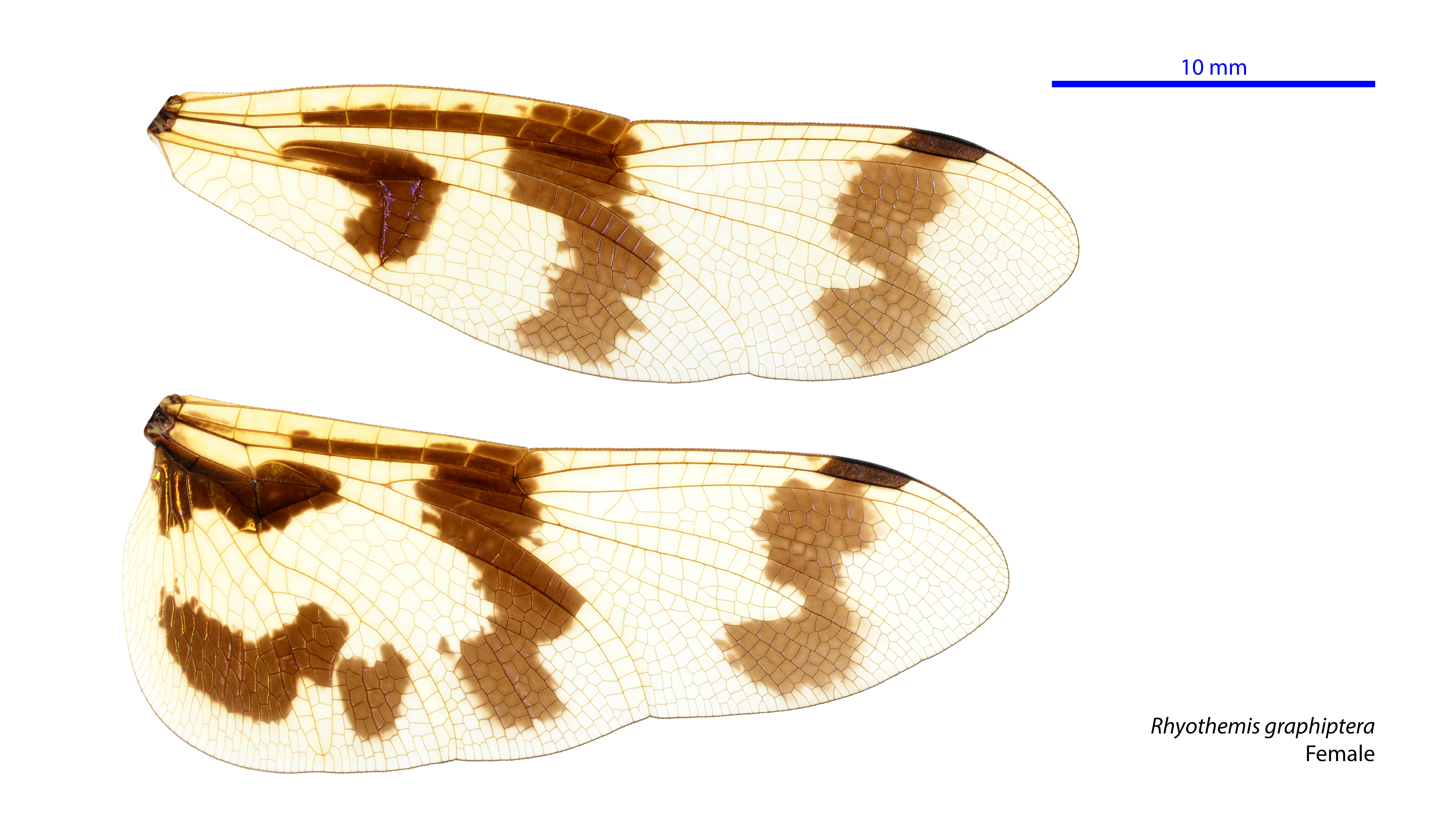
Female wings

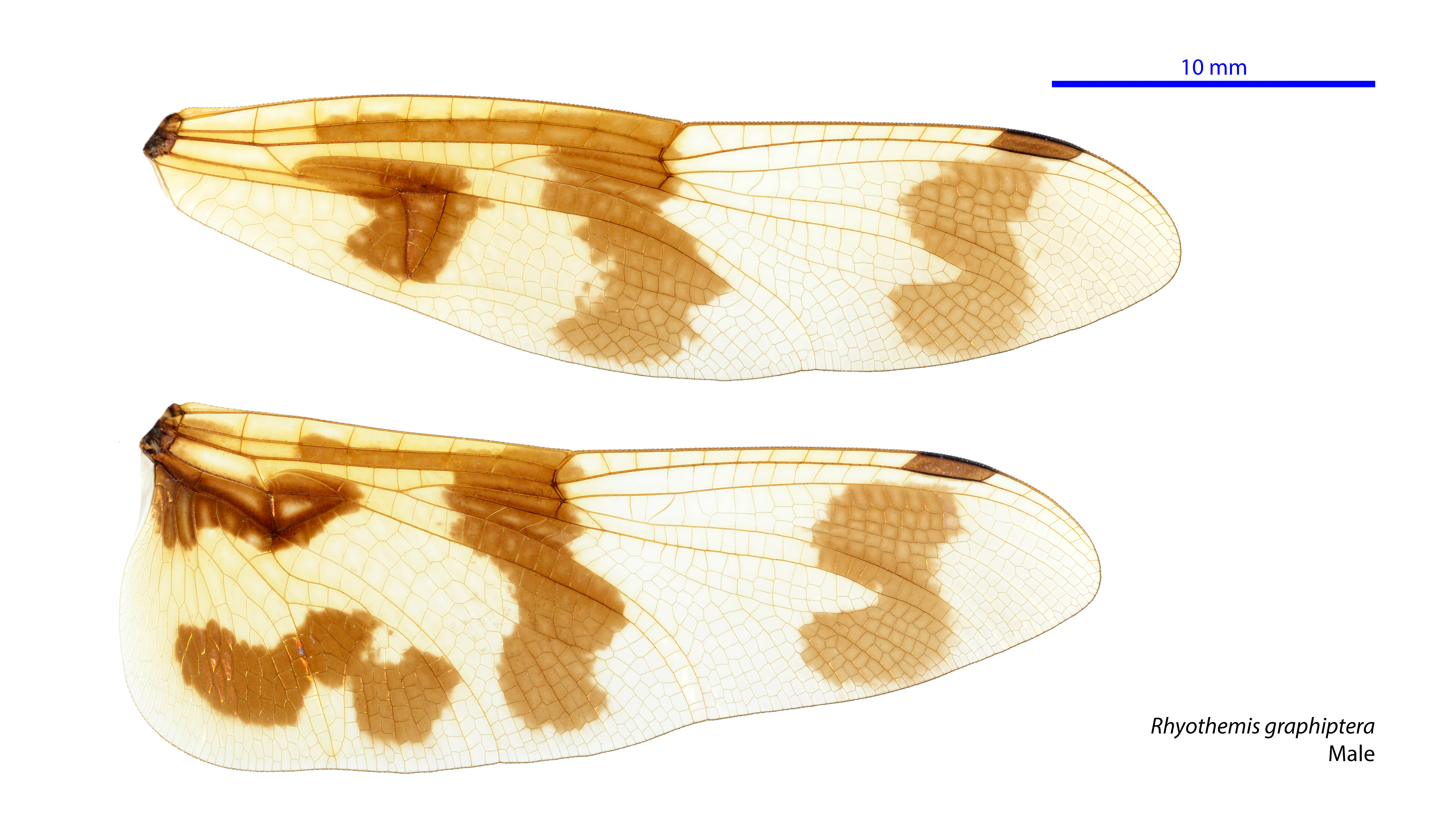
Male wings

== See also ==
- List of Odonata species of Australia
