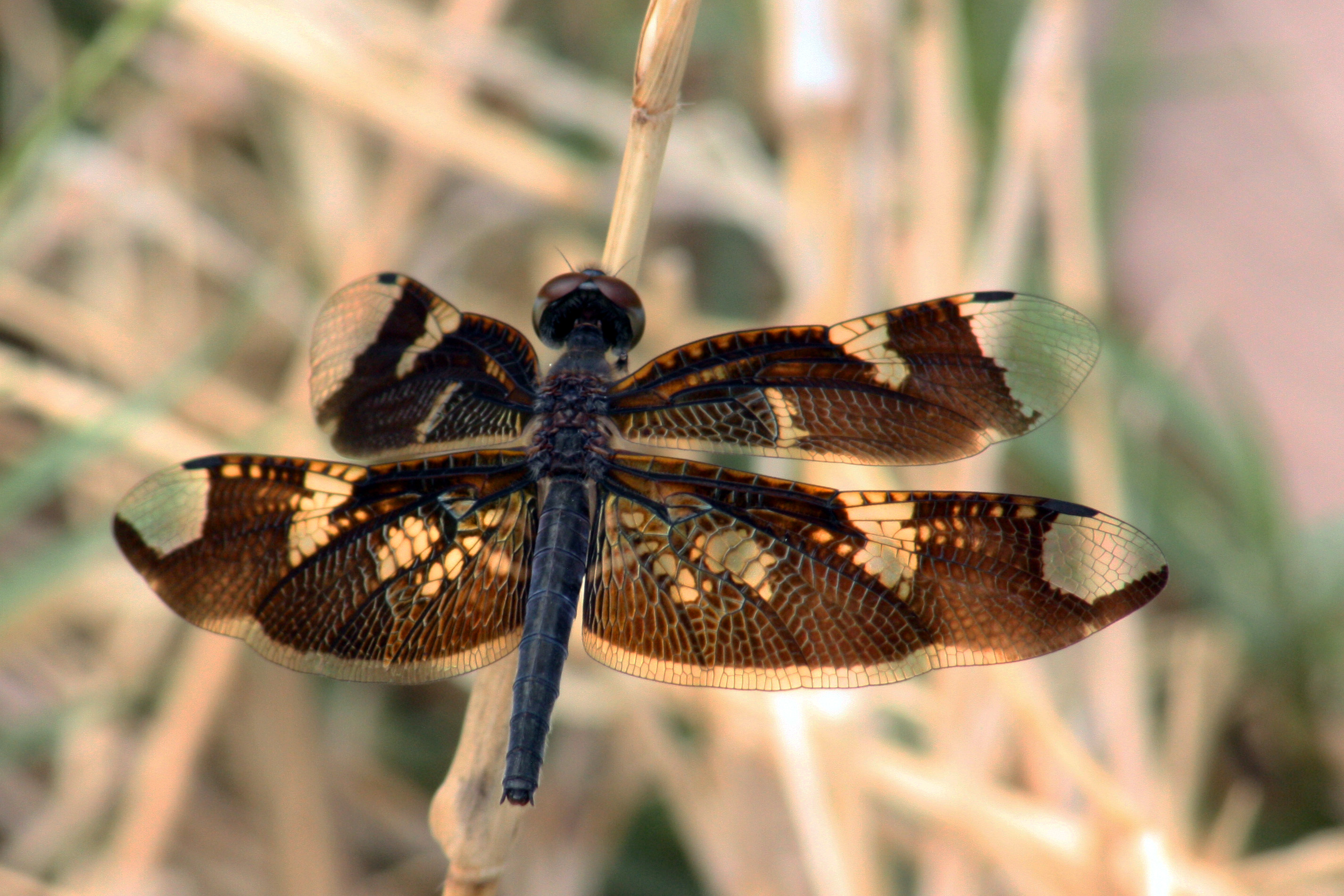
- In the Okavango Delta, Botswana

Conservation status
- Least Concern (IUCN 3.1)

Scientific classification
- Kingdom: Animalia
- Phylum: Arthropoda
- Clade: Pancrustacea
- Class: Insecta
- Order: Odonata
- Infraorder: Anisoptera
- Family: Libellulidae
- Genus: Rhyothemis
- Species: R. fenestrina

Binomial name
- Rhyothemis fenestrina (Rambur, 1842)

= Rhyothemis fenestrina =

Species of dragonfly

Rhyothemis fenestrina, known as the black-winged flutterer, golden flutterer, or skylight flutterer, is a species of dragonfly in the family Libellulidae. It is found in Angola, Botswana, the Republic of the Congo, the Democratic Republic of the Congo, Gabon, Ghana, Kenya, Liberia, Malawi, Namibia, Nigeria, Senegal, Sierra Leone, Tanzania, Uganda, Zambia, and possibly Burundi. Its natural habitats are swamps, intermittent freshwater lakes, freshwater marshes, and intermittent freshwater marshes.
