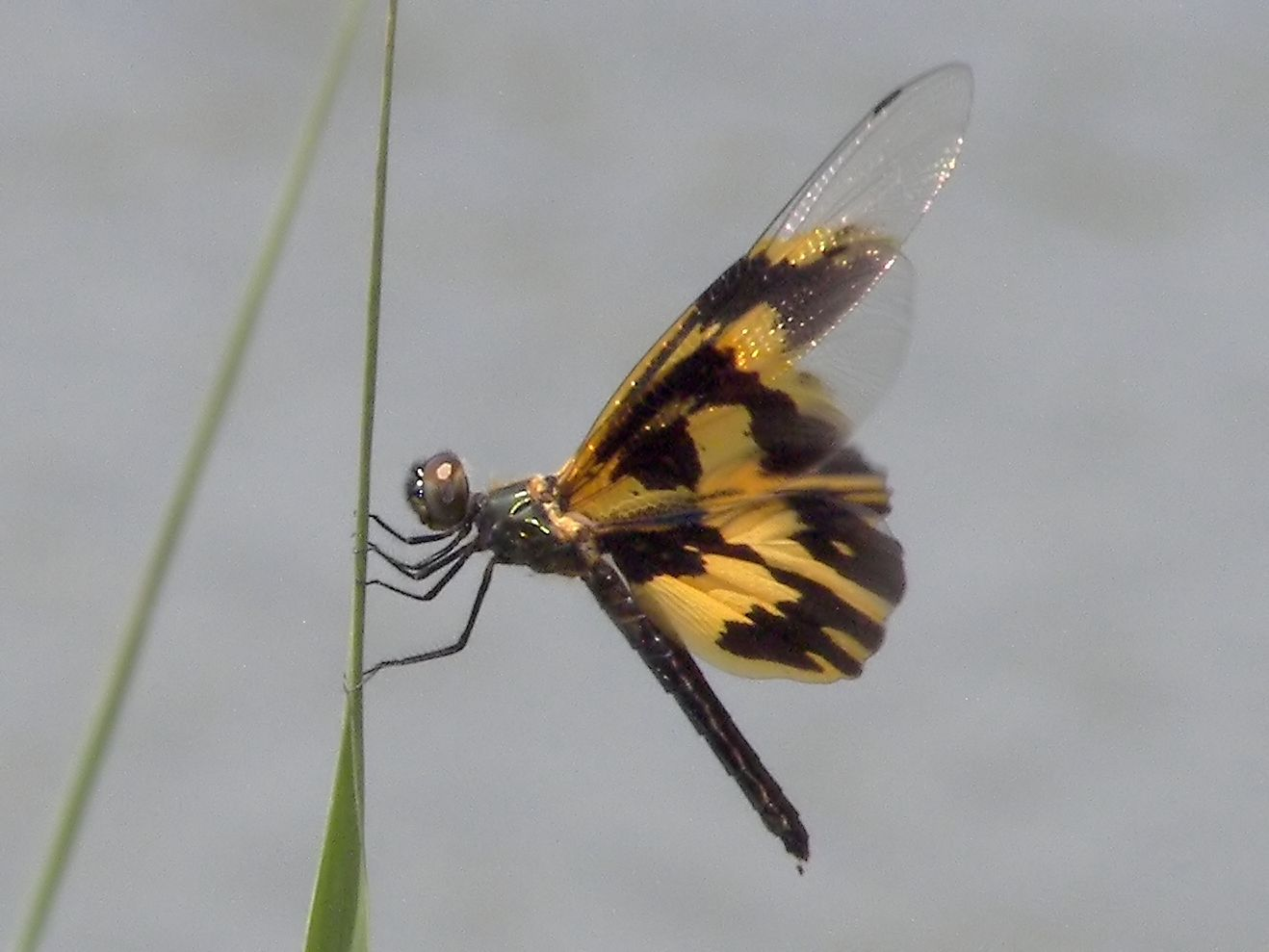
- Rhyothemis variegata

Scientific classification
- Kingdom: Animalia
- Phylum: Arthropoda
- Clade: Pancrustacea
- Class: Insecta
- Order: Odonata
- Infraorder: Anisoptera
- Family: Libellulidae
- Subfamily: Trameinae
- Tribe: Rhyothemistini
- Genus: Rhyothemis; Hagen, 1867

= Rhyothemis =

Flutterers

Genus of dragonflies

Rhyothemis is a genus of dragonfly in the family Libellulidae. They are commonly known as flutterers.

Rhyothemis species are found in Africa, Asia, Australia and the Pacific region. The flight of the genus Rhyothemis is usually fluttering, leading to the common description of "flutterer" for most species in the genus.

== Etymology ==
The genus name Rhyothemis is derived from the Greek ῥέω (rheō, "to flow") and -themis, from Greek Θέμις (Themis), the goddess of divine law, order and justice. In early odonate taxonomy, names ending in -themis were widely used for dragonflies. The name may refer to the irregularly banded and coloured wings of species in the genus, resembling flow banding in rhyolite.

== Species ==
The genus Rhyothemis includes the following species:

Male	Female	Scientific name	Common name	Distribution
		Rhyothemis aterrima Selys, 1891	Black Jewel Flutterer	Brunei Darussalam; Cambodia; Indonesia (Kalimantan, Sumatera); Malaysia (Sabah, Peninsular Malaysia, Sarawak); Thailand; Viet Nam;
		Rhyothemis braganza Karsch, 1890	Iridescent Flutterer	Australia (Western Australia, Queensland, Northern Territory)
		Rhyothemis cognata (Rambur, 1842)	Madagascar Flutterer	Madagascar
		Rhyothemis fenestrina (Rambur, 1842)	Skylight Flutterer	Angola; Benin; Botswana; Cameroon; Congo; Democratic Republic of the Congo; Côte d'Ivoire; Gabon; Ghana; Kenya; Liberia; Malawi; Namibia; Nigeria; Rwanda; Senegal; Sierra Leone; Tanzania; Uganda; Zambia
		Rhyothemis fulgens Kirby, 1889	Bornean Brown Flutterer	Brunei Darussalam; Indonesia (Kalimantan, Sumatera); Malaysia (Peninsular Malaysia, Sarawak); Singapore
		Rhyothemis fuliginosa Selys, 1883	Butterfly Flutterer	China, Korea, and Japan
		Rhyothemis graphiptera (Rambur, 1842)	Graphic Flutterer or Banded Flutterer or Small Pond Dragonfly	Australia (New South Wales, Northern Territory, Queensland, Western Australia); Indonesia (Papua, Lesser Sunda Is., Maluku); New Caledonia; Papua New Guinea
		Rhyothemis hurleyi Tillyard, 1926		Indonesia (Papua)
		Rhyothemis mariposa Ris, 1913	Mariposa Flutterer	Democratic Republic of the Congo; Zambia; Angola; Namibia
		Rhyothemis notata (Fabricius, 1781)	Veiled Flutterer	Benin; Cameroon; Central African Republic; Congo; Democratic Republic of the Congo; Gabon; Gambia; Ghana; Liberia; Nigeria; Sierra Leone
		Rhyothemis plutonia Selys, 1883	Greater Bluewing or Great Sapphire Flutterer	Bangladesh; China (Hainan); India (Assam, West Bengal); Indonesia (Sumatera); Laos; Malaysia (Peninsular Malaysia); Myanmar (mainland); Nepal; Thailand; Viet Nam
		Rhyothemis princeps Kirby, 1894	Australian Sapphire Flutterer or Zircon Flutterer	Australia (Queensland); Indonesia (Papua); Papua New Guinea (main island group)
		Rhyothemis pygmaea (Brauer, 1867)	Small Bronze Flutterer	Indonesia (Sulawesi, Maluku, Papua)
		Rhyothemis regia (Brauer, 1867)	Pied Sapphire Flutterer	American Samoa (American Samoa, Swains Is.); Indonesia (Papua, Lesser Sunda Is., Maluku); Malaysia (Sabah); Northern Mariana Islands; Philippines; Samoa; Taiwan; Tokelau; Tonga; Wallis and Futuna
		Rhyothemis resplendens Selys, 1878	Jewel Flutterer	Australia (Queensland); Indonesia (Maluku, Papua); Papua New Guinea (main island group, North Solomons, Bismarck Archipelago); Philippines; Solomon Islands (South Solomons)
		Rhyothemis rita Kovacs and Theischinger, 2016	Rita Flutterer	Indonesia (Papua)
		Rhyothemis semihyalina (Desjardins, 1832)	Phantom Flutterer	Angola (Cabinda, Angola); Azerbaijan; Benin; Botswana; Cameroon; Chad; Comoros; Democratic Republic of the Congo; Côte d'Ivoire; Eritrea; Eswatini; Ethiopia; Gabon; Gambia; Georgia; Ghana; Guinea-Bissau; Iran; Iraq; Kenya; Liberia; Madagascar; Malawi; Mauritius (main island); Mayotte; Mozambique; Namibia (main part, Caprivi Strip); Nigeria; Oman; Rwanda; Réunion; Senegal; Seychelles (Aldabra, Seychelles (main island group)); Sierra Leone; Somalia; South Africa (Free State, Gauteng, KwaZulu-Natal, Limpopo Province, Mpumalanga, North-West Province, Western Cape); South Sudan; Syria; Tanzania; Togo; Turkey (Turkey-in-Asia); Uganda; Zambia; Zimbabwe
		Rhyothemis severini Ris, 1913	Bluetip Flutterer	Taiwan
		Rhyothemis splendens Fraser, 1955	Splendid Flutterer	Democratic Republic of the Congo
		Rhyothemis triangularis Kirby, 1889	Asian Sapphire Flutterer or Lesser Bluewing	Brunei Darussalam; China (Fujian, Guangdong); Hong Kong; India (Tamil Nadu, Assam, Kerala, Karnataka); Indonesia (Kalimantan, Jawa, Sumatera); Malaysia (Sarawak, Peninsular Malaysia, Sabah); Philippines; Singapore; Sri Lanka; Taiwan; Thailand
		Rhyothemis variegata (Linnaeus, 1763)	Common Picture Wing or Variegated Flutterer	Bangladesh; Cambodia; China (Guangdong, Hainan, Fujian); Guam; Hong Kong; India (Mahé, Uttaranchal, Daman, Gujarat, Delhi, Haryana, Assam, Dadra-Nagar-Haveli, Pondicherry, Bihar, Jharkhand, Goa, Uttar Pradesh, Orissa, Arunachal Pradesh, Yanam, Darjiling, Himachal Pradesh, Sikkim, Andhra Pradesh, Karnataka, Nagaland, Chandigarh, Tripura, Manipur, West Bengal, Maharashtra, Mizoram, Chhattisgarh, Meghalaya, Madhya Pradesh, Jammu-Kashmir, Tamil Nadu, Karaikal, Punjab, Andaman Is., Kerala, Diu); Laos; Myanmar (mainland); Nepal; Sri Lanka; Taiwan; Thailand; Viet Nam
