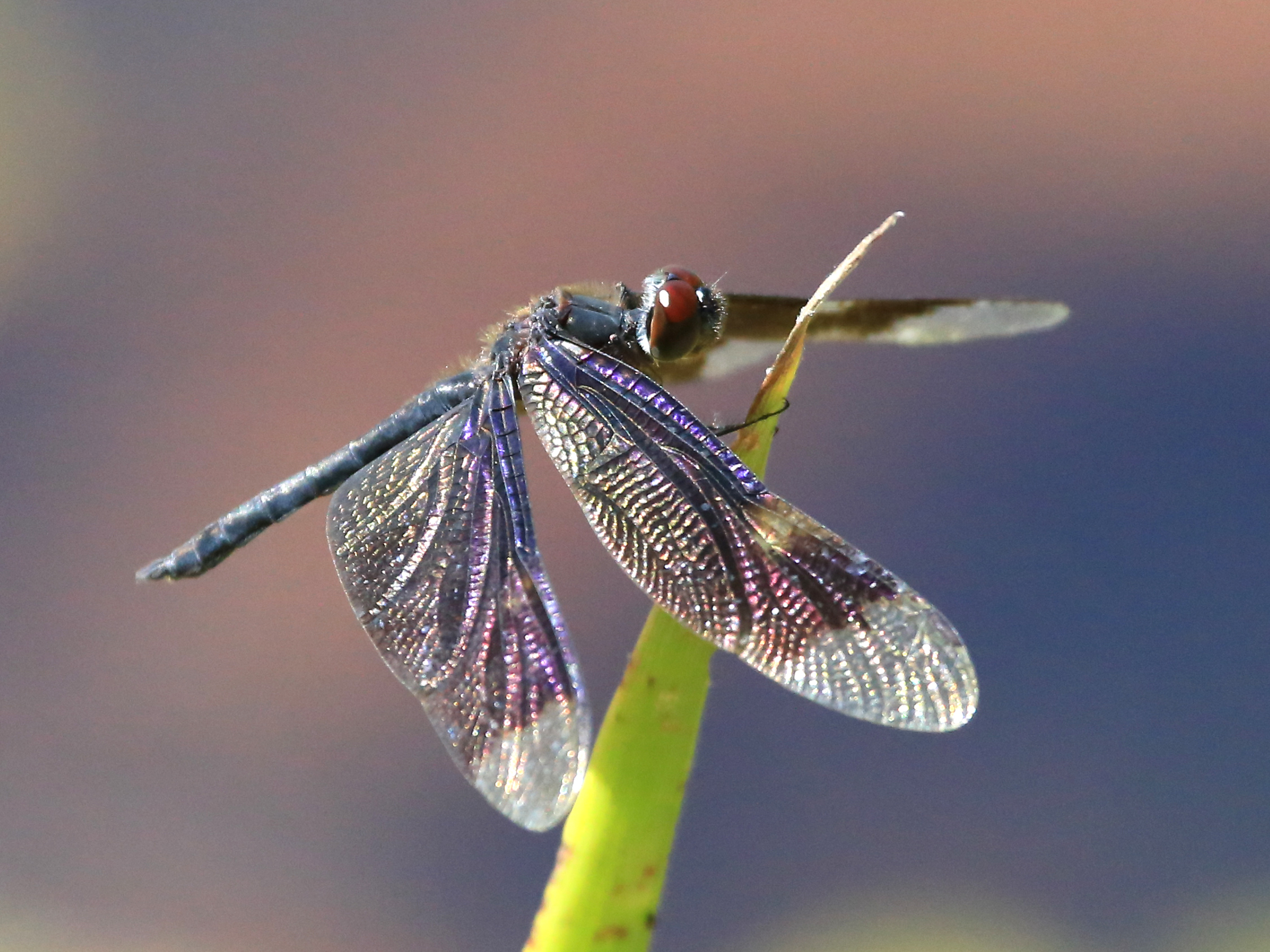
- Female
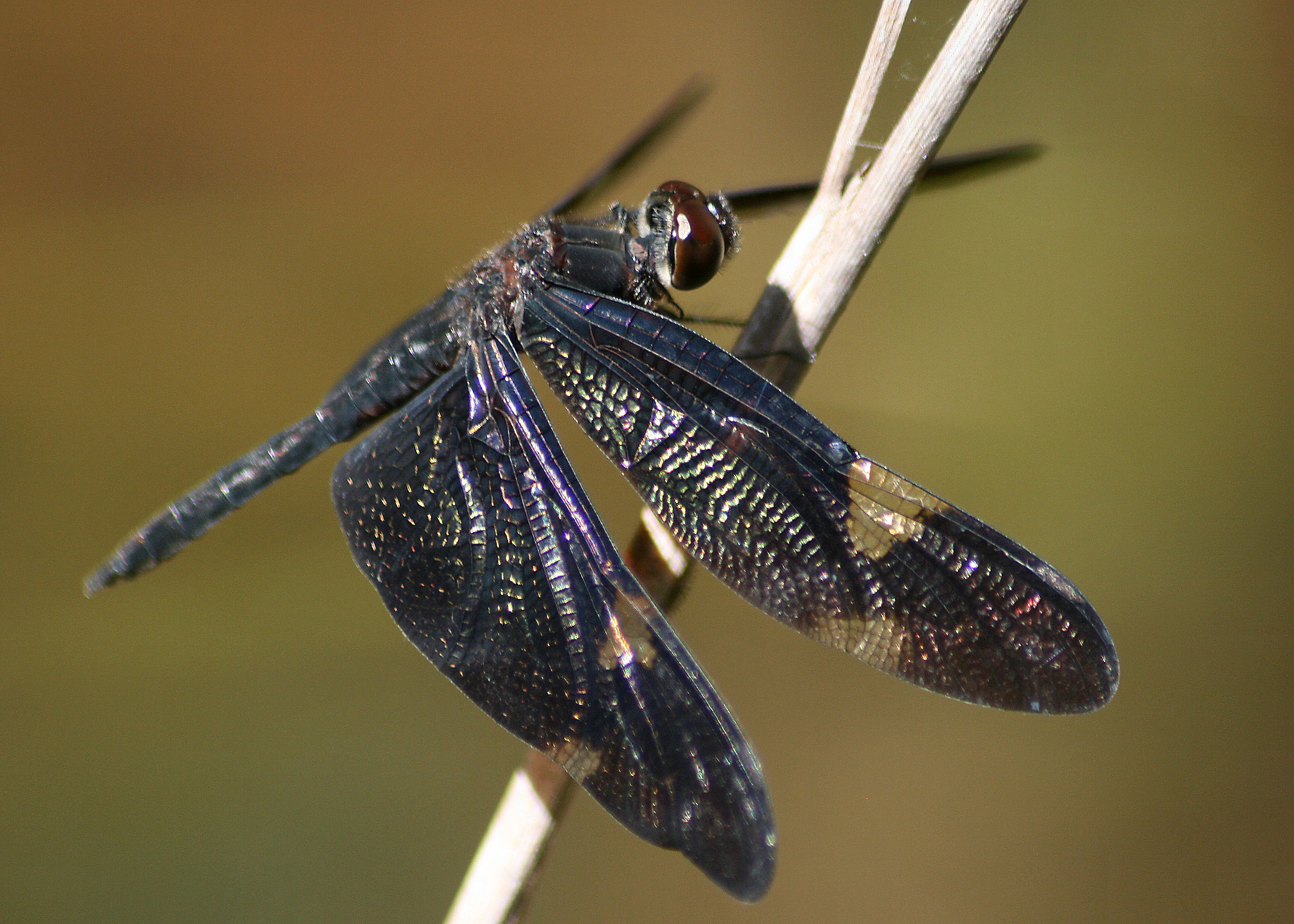
- Male

Conservation status
- Least Concern (IUCN 3.1)

Scientific classification
- Kingdom: Animalia
- Phylum: Arthropoda
- Clade: Pancrustacea
- Class: Insecta
- Order: Odonata
- Infraorder: Anisoptera
- Family: Libellulidae
- Genus: Rhyothemis
- Species: R. princeps

Binomial name
- Rhyothemis princeps Kirby, 1894

= Rhyothemis princeps =

Species of dragonfly

Rhyothemis princeps, known as the sapphire flutterer, is a species of dragonfly of the family Libellulidae. The flight of the genus Rhyothemis is usually fluttering, leading to the common description of "flutterer" for most species in the genus.

Rhyothemis princeps is found in Australia and New Guinea only. It is a medium-sized dragonfly (wingspan 70mm, length 40mm) that inhabits a variety of freshwater lakes, ponds, and swamps. It has a dark blue to black abdomen, and its wings are dark, with two or three pale patches on the outer section. Males have dark patches extending to their wingtips, whereas females have clear wingtips. In sunlight the dark colours can reflect a metallic purplish tinge. In Australia its range is limited to north-eastern Queensland from Cape York Peninsula to around Rockhampton.

== Etymology ==
The genus name Rhyothemis is derived from the Greek ῥέω (rheō, "to flow") and -themis, from Greek Θέμις (Themis), the goddess of divine law, order and justice. In early odonate taxonomy, names ending in -themis were widely used for dragonflies. The name may refer to the irregularly banded and coloured wings of species in the genus, resembling flow banding in rhyolite.

The species name princeps is Latin for "first", "chief" or "foremost", possibly comparing this species with Rhyothemis regia, where regia is Latin for "royal" or "kingly".

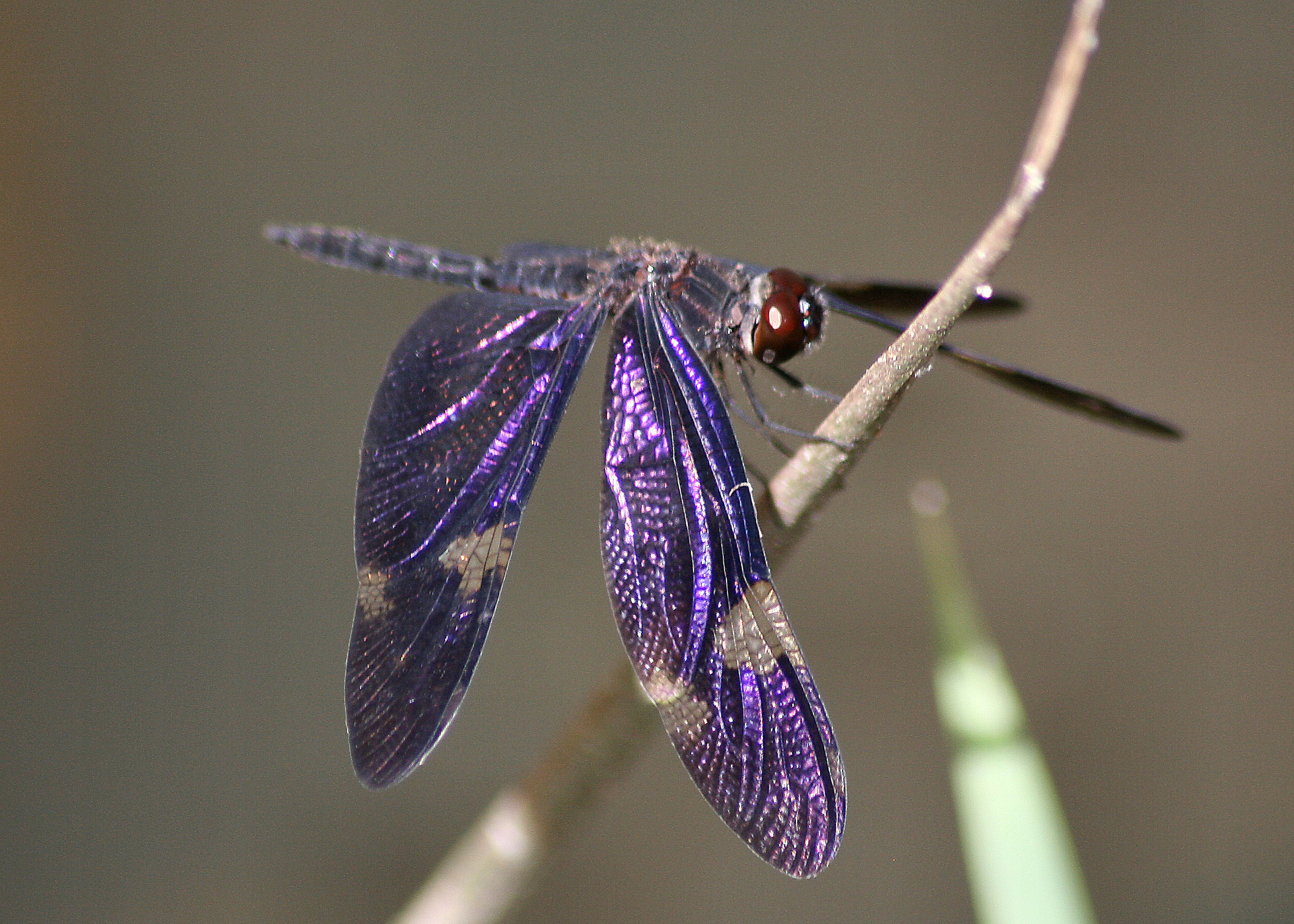
Male side view

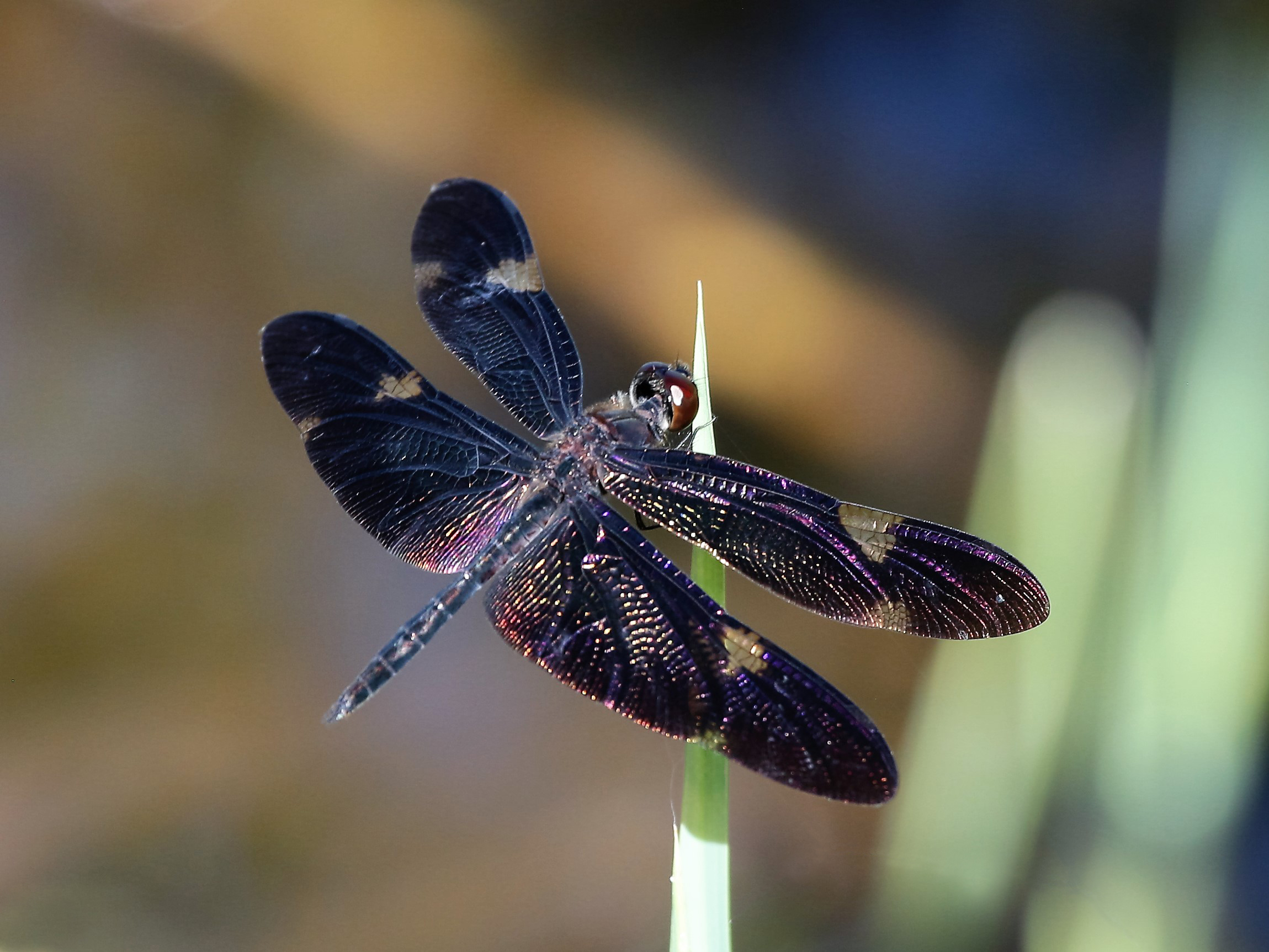
Male viewed from above

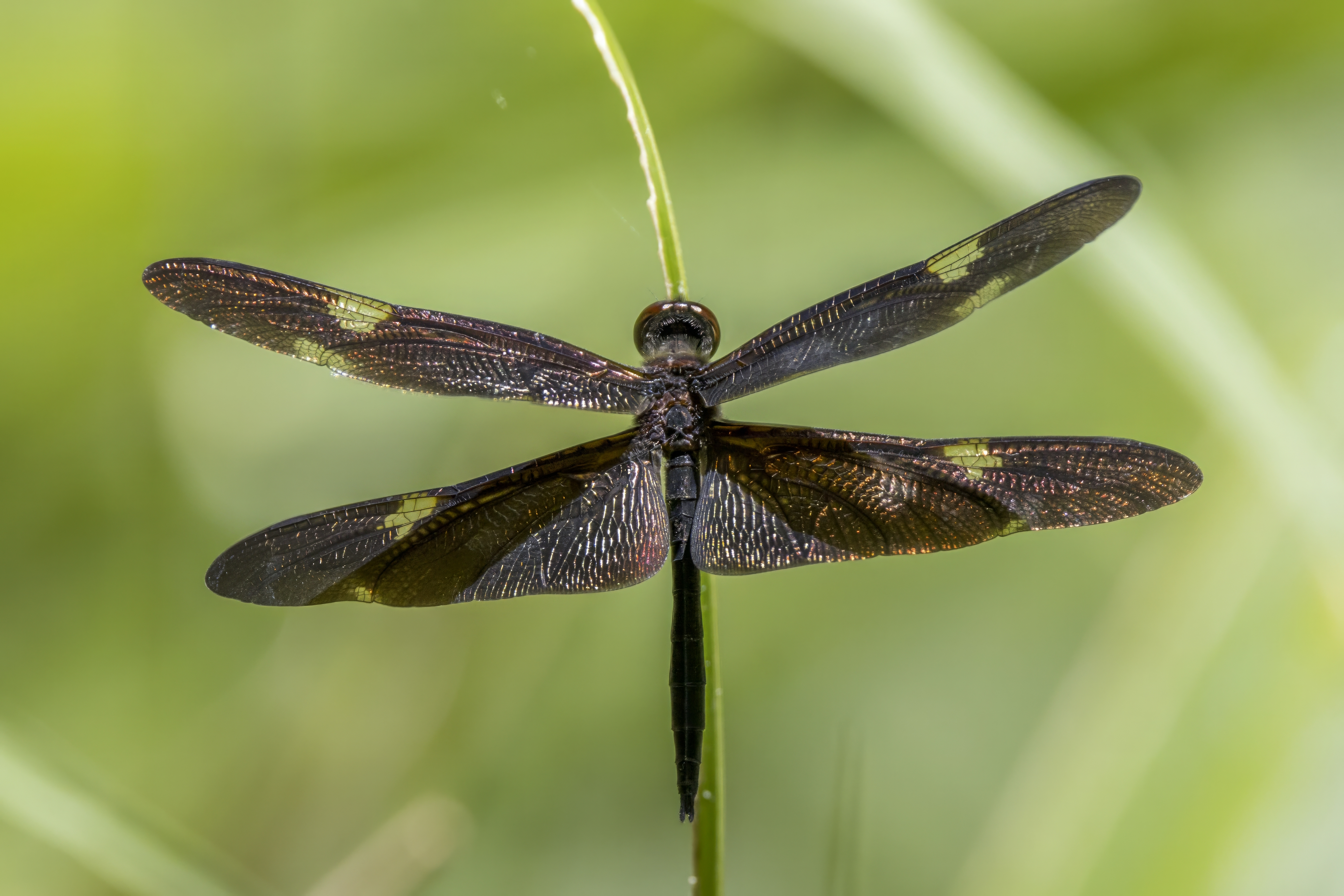
Male, Cattana Wetlands

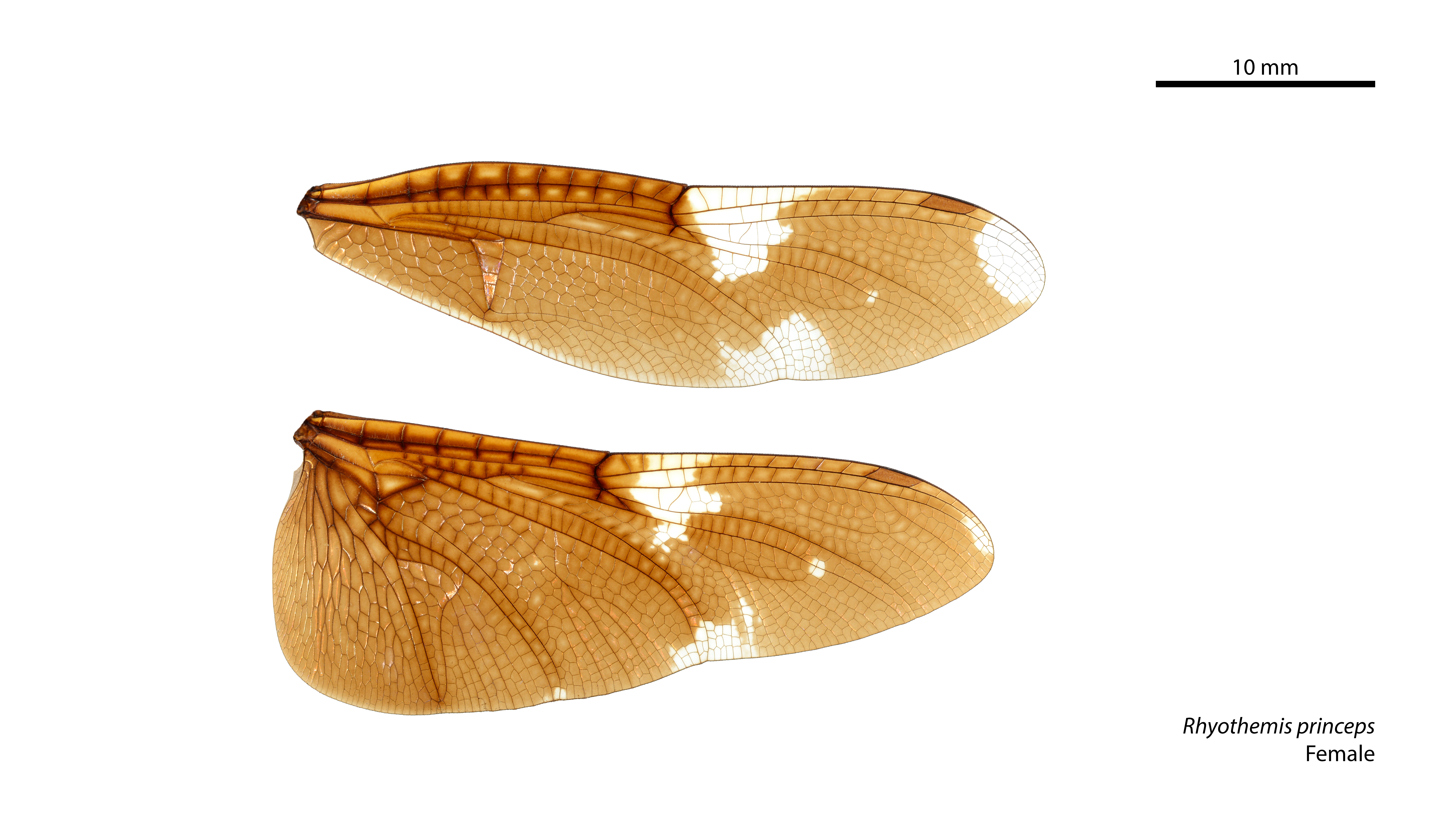
Female wings

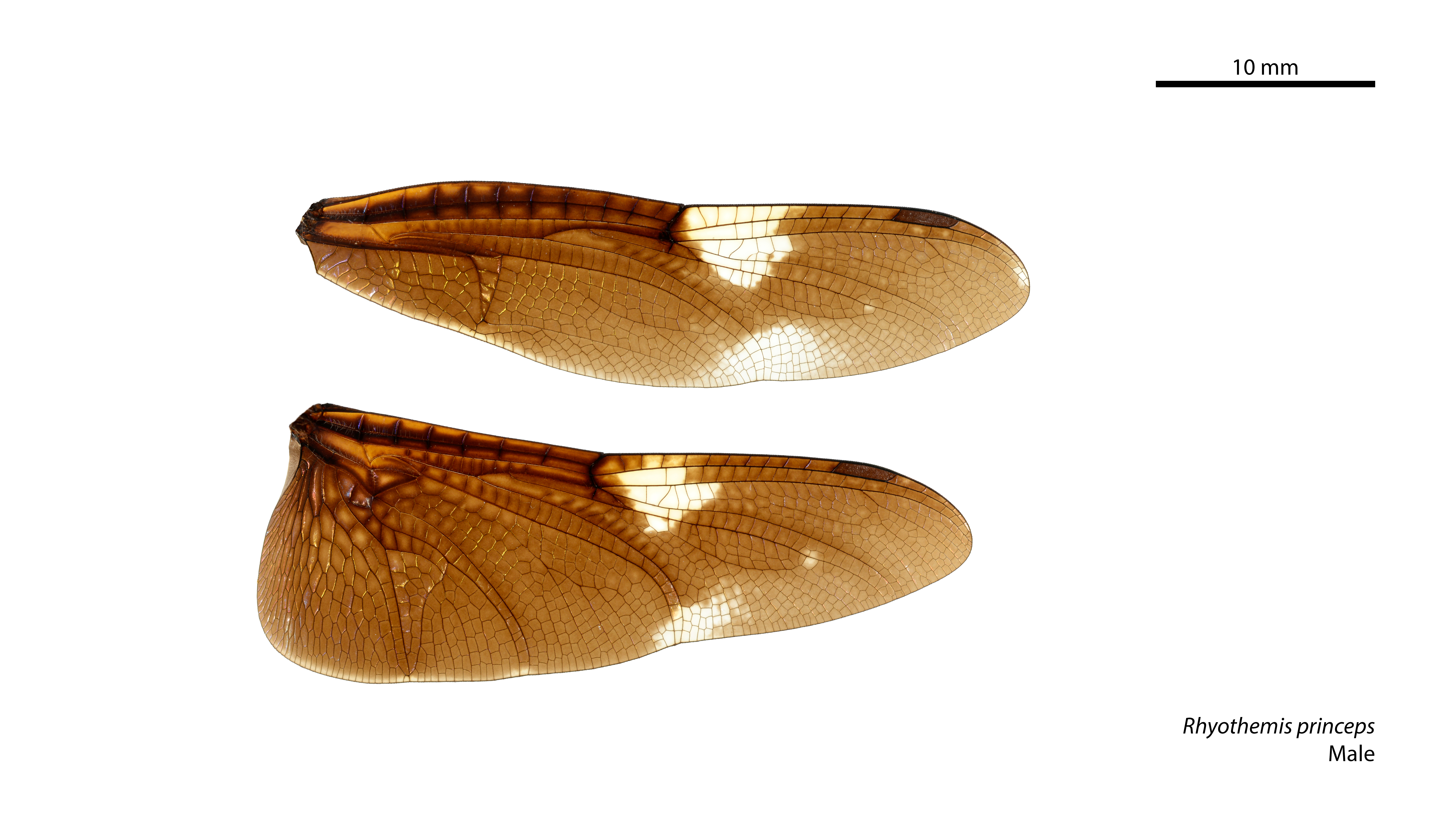
Male wings

== See also ==
- List of Odonata species of Australia
