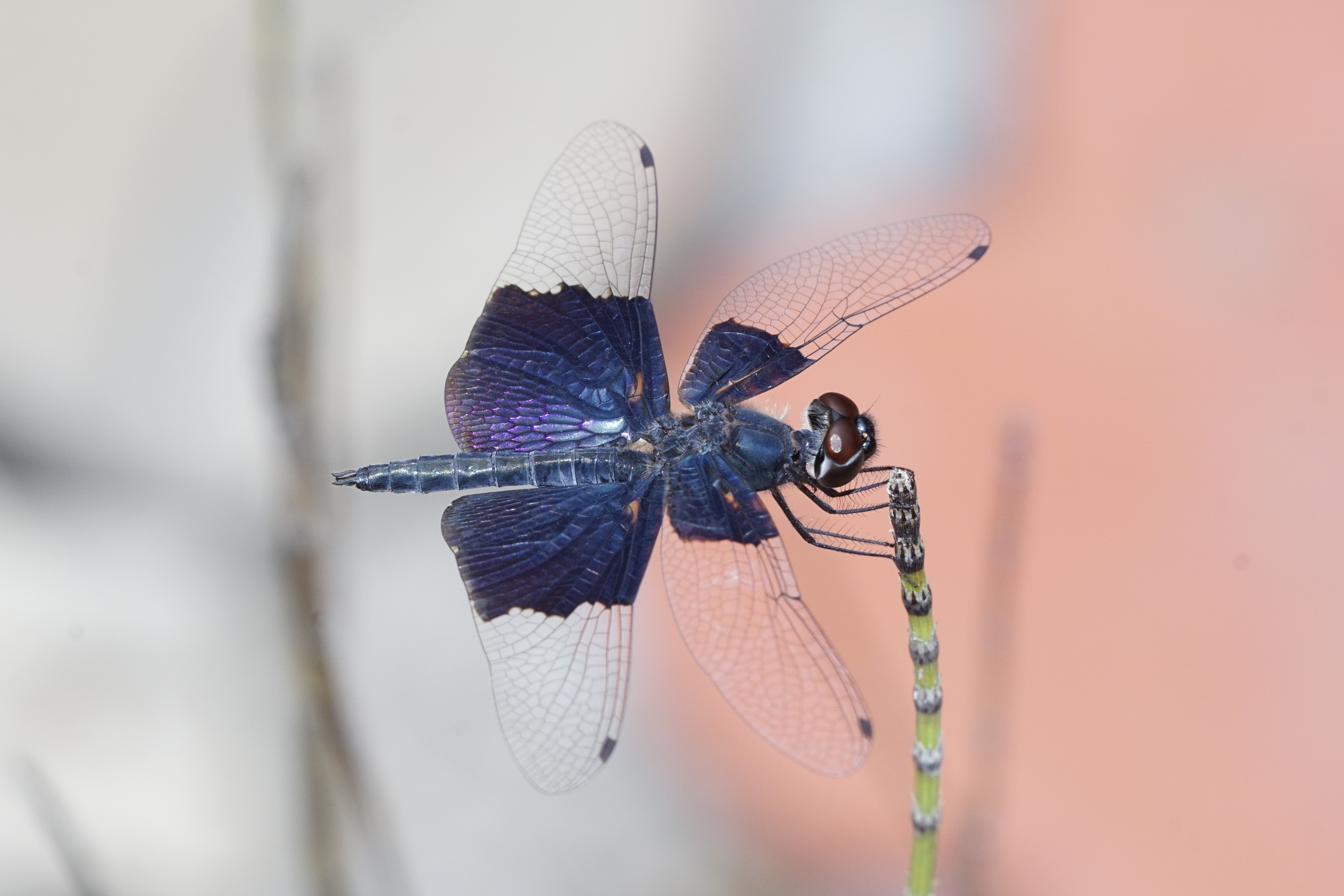
- Male
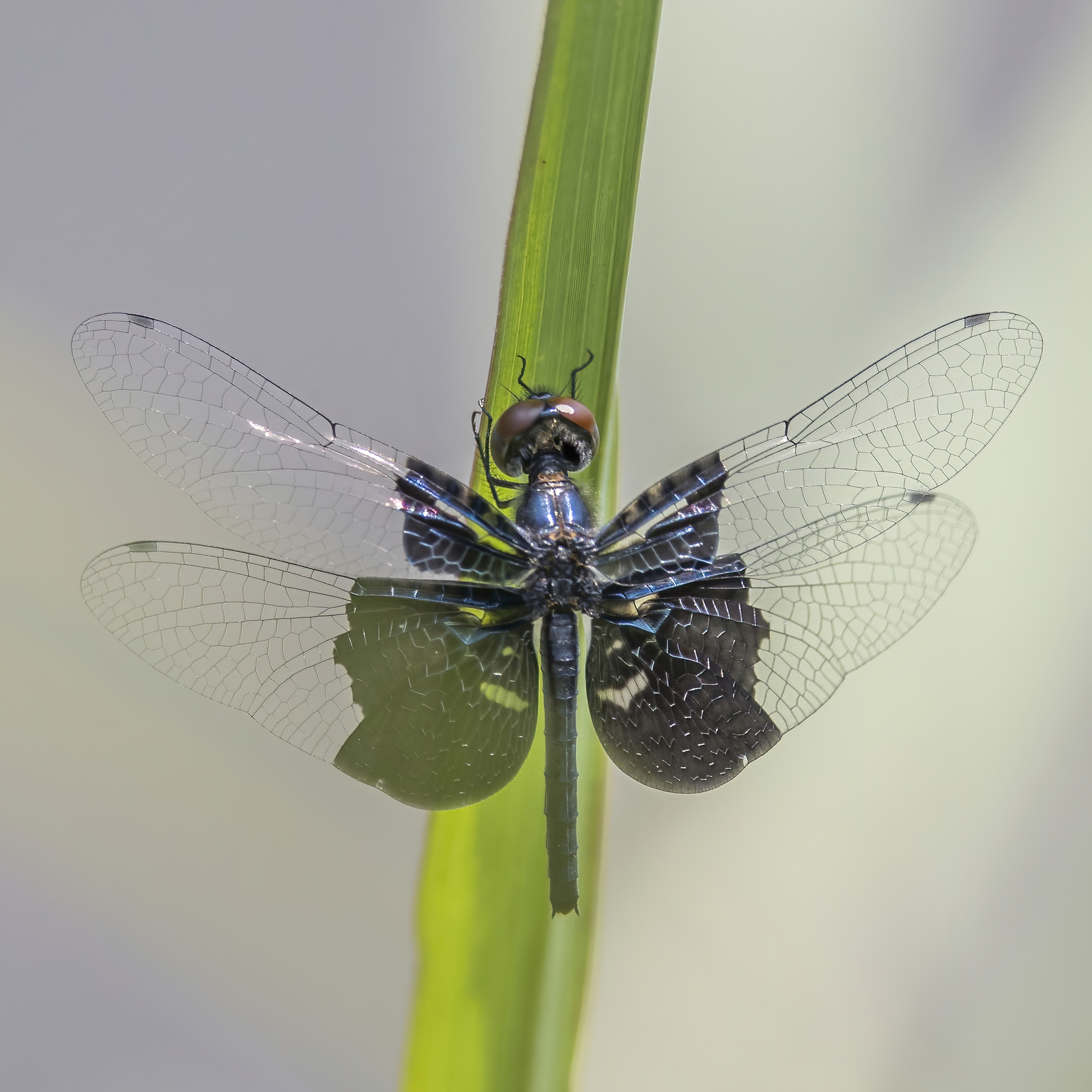
- feale

Conservation status
- Least Concern (IUCN 3.1)

Scientific classification
- Kingdom: Animalia
- Phylum: Arthropoda
- Clade: Pancrustacea
- Class: Insecta
- Order: Odonata
- Infraorder: Anisoptera
- Superfamily: Libelluloidea
- Family: Libellulidae
- Genus: Rhyothemis
- Species: R. triangularis

Binomial name
- Rhyothemis triangularis Kirby, 1889

Synonyms
- Rhyothemis bipartita Tillyard, 1906; Rhyothemis lankana Kirby, 1894

= Rhyothemis triangularis =

Sapphire flutterer

Species of dragonfly

Rhyothemis triangularis (sapphire flutterer, lesser blue wing) is a species of dragonfly in the family Libellulidae. It is widespread in eastern and southern Asia.

== Description and habitat ==
It is a small blue colored dragonfly with bases of all wings have dark metallic blue patches. This species breeds in well vegetated ponds and similar habitats. From karyotyping it is known to have 13 chromosomes.

=== See also ===
- List of odonates of Sri Lanka
- List of odonates of India
- List of odonata of Kerala
