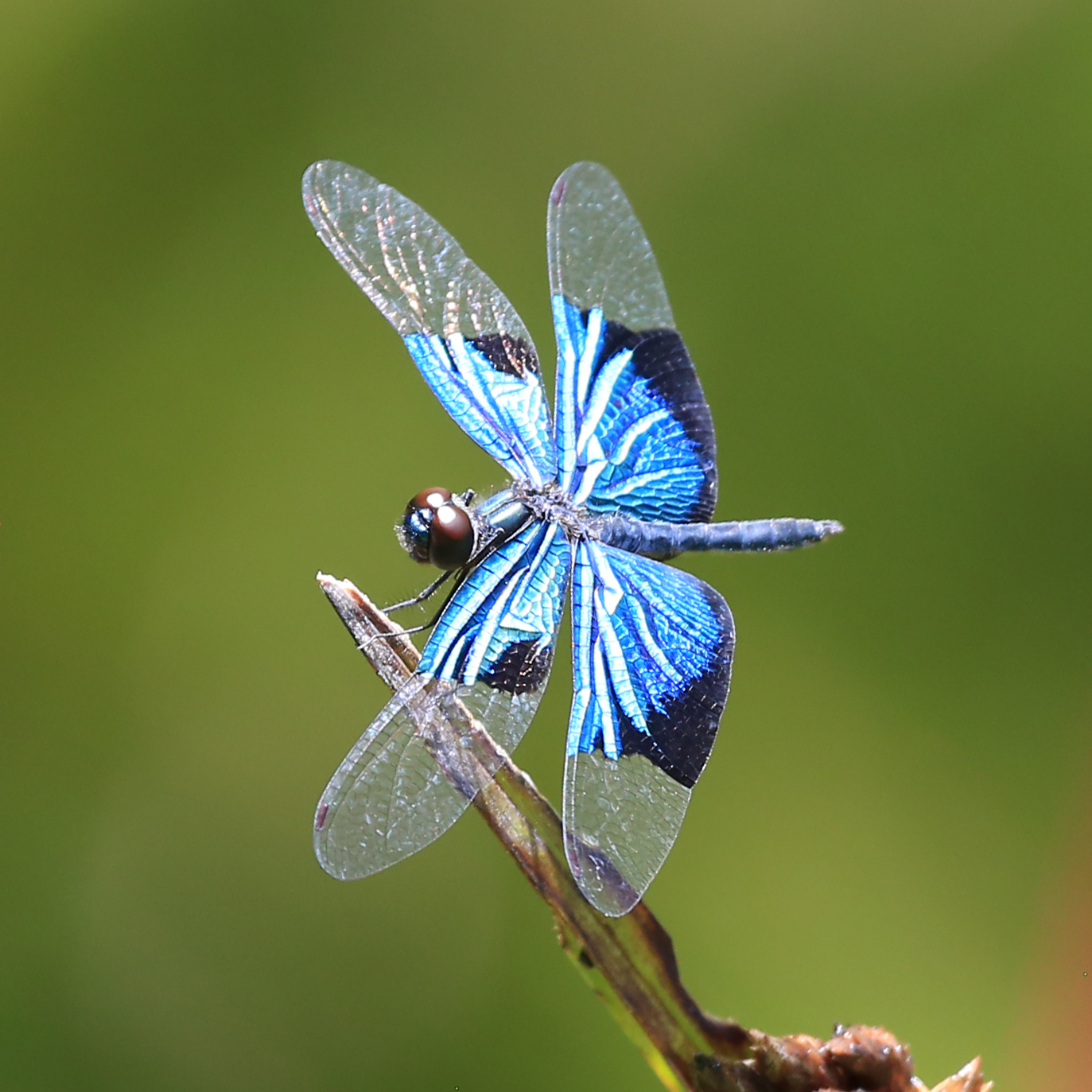
- Male, Cairns, Queensland, Australia

Conservation status
- Least Concern (IUCN 3.1)

Scientific classification
- Kingdom: Animalia
- Phylum: Arthropoda
- Clade: Pancrustacea
- Class: Insecta
- Order: Odonata
- Infraorder: Anisoptera
- Family: Libellulidae
- Genus: Rhyothemis
- Species: R. resplendens

Binomial name
- Rhyothemis resplendens Selys, 1878

Synonyms
- Rhyothemis turneri (Kirby, 1894)

= Rhyothemis resplendens =

Species of dragonfly

Rhyothemis resplendens, common name Jewel flutterer, is a species of dragonfly in the family Libellulidae. The genus Rhyothemis extends from Africa to the western Pacific, with five species known in Australia. The species Rhyothemis resplendens has blue metallic reflecting panels on both wing sets, and inhabits streams, rivers and still waters on and adjacent to coastal Queensland, from around Mackay to the northern part of Cape York Peninsula. It is a small dragonfly with a wingspan of 40-60mm and body length around 25mm. To the north of Australia it is found in the Moluccas, New Guinea and the Bismarck Archipelago. On the adult, markings on the hindwing are longer than those on the forewing. The taxon has been assessed for the IUCN Red List as being of least concern.

== Etymology ==
The genus name Rhyothemis is derived from the Greek ῥέω (rheō, "to flow") and -themis, from Greek Θέμις (Themis), the goddess of divine law, order and justice. In early odonate taxonomy, names ending in -themis were widely used for dragonflies. The name may refer to the irregularly banded and coloured wings of species in the genus, resembling flow banding in rhyolite.

The species name resplendens is Latin for "glittering" or "shining", referring to the dark blue metallic wing markings.

== Gallery ==
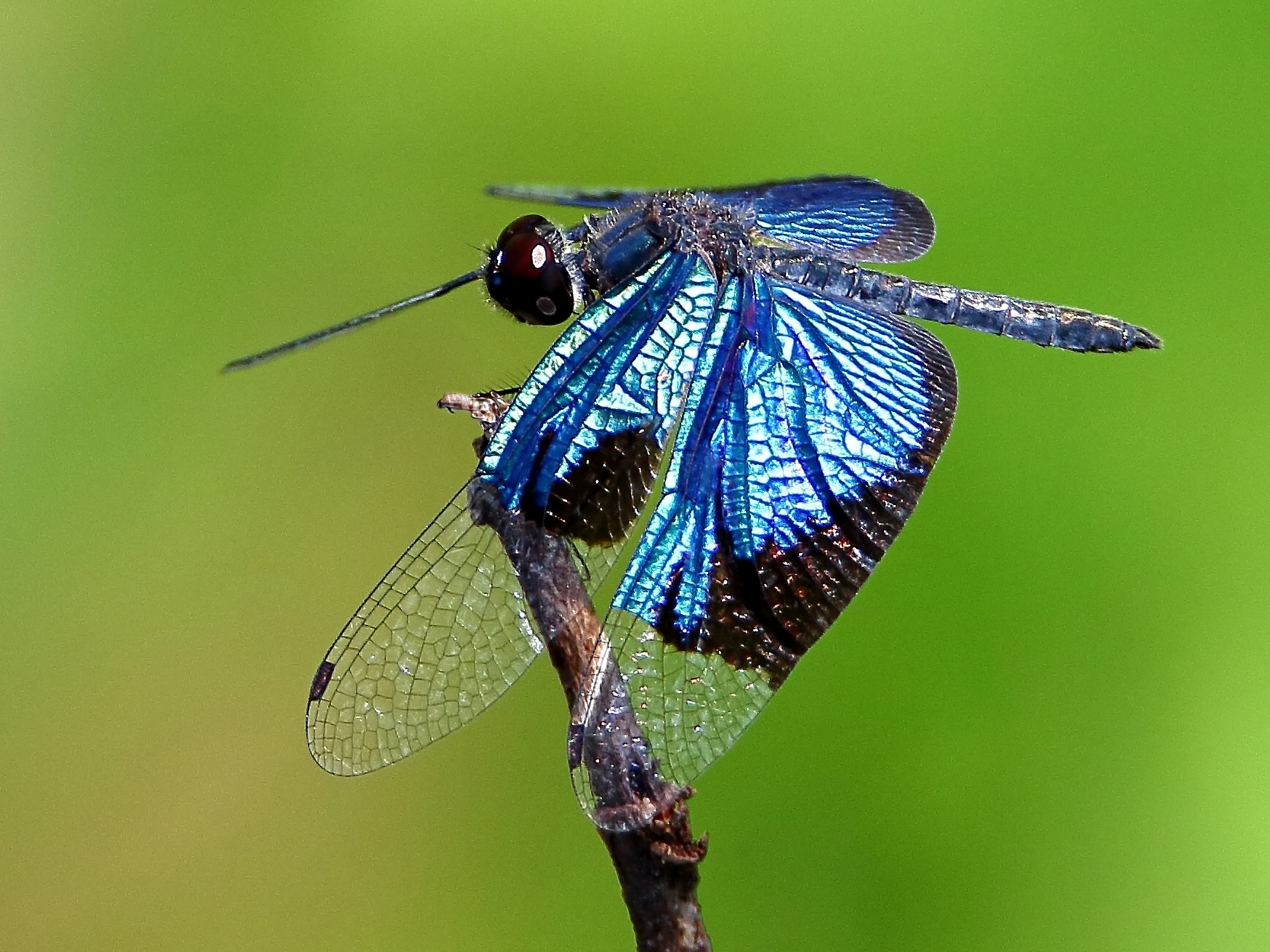
Centenary Lakes, Cairns

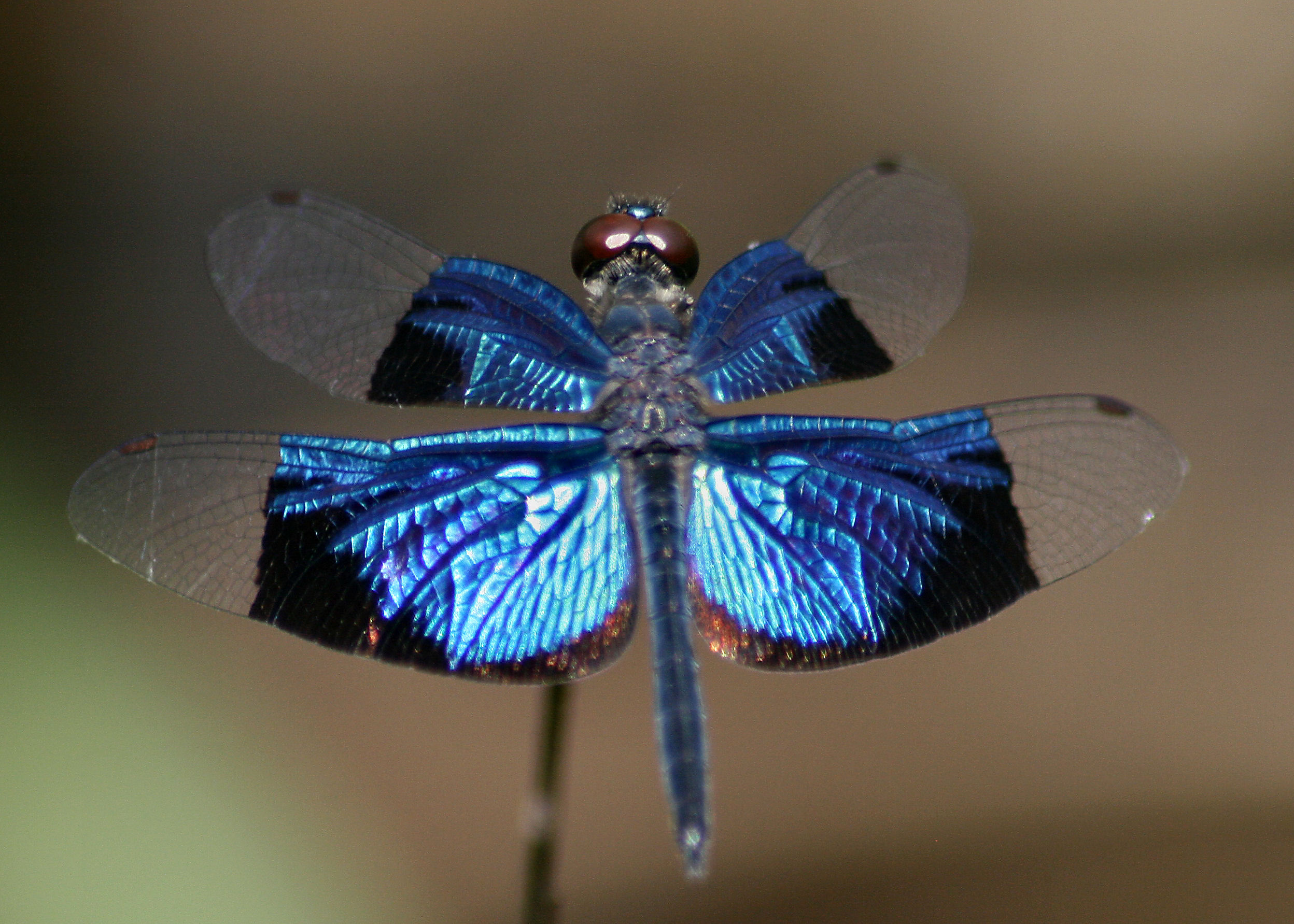
Male with wing reflections

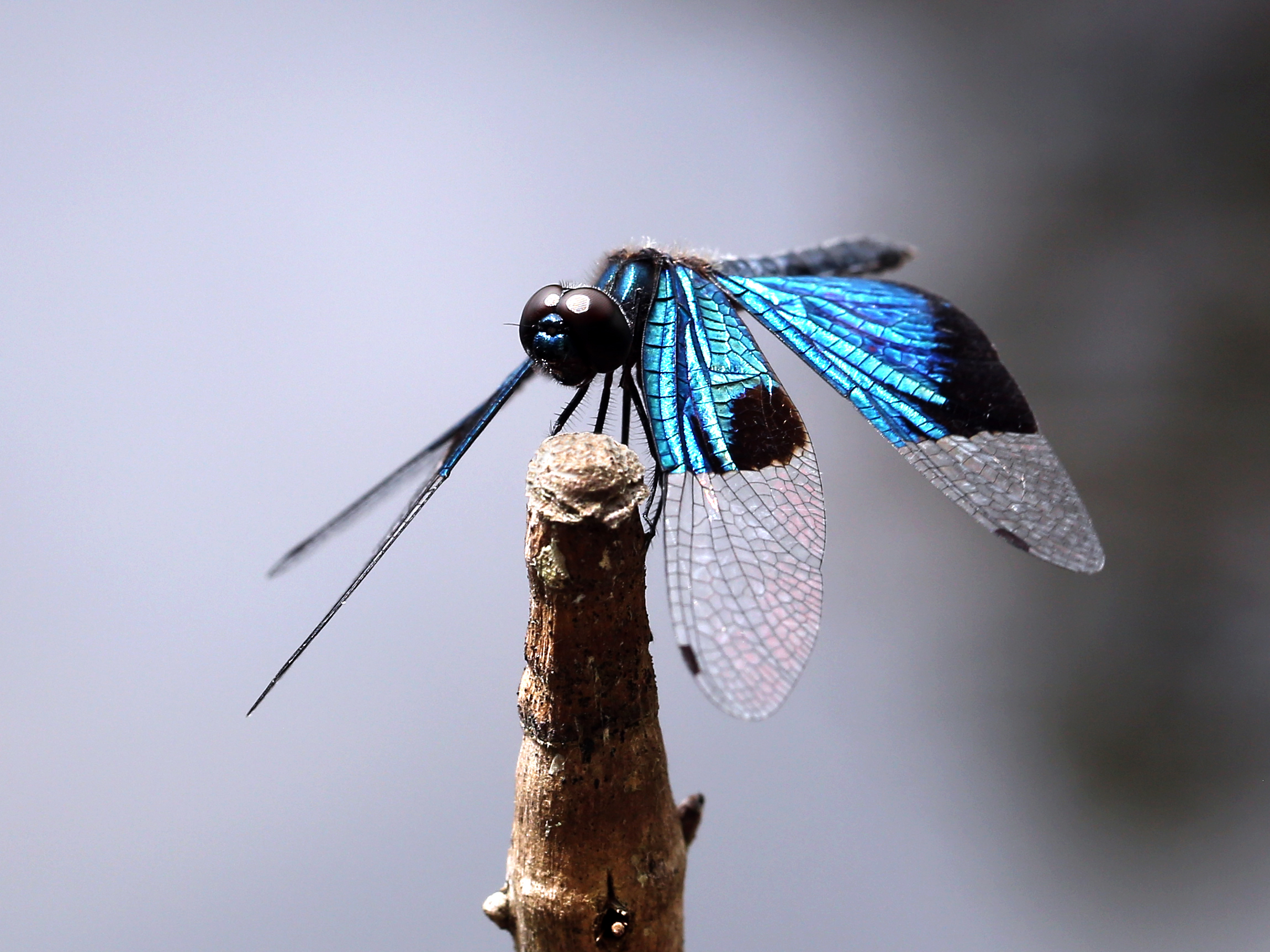
The aptly named jewel flutterer

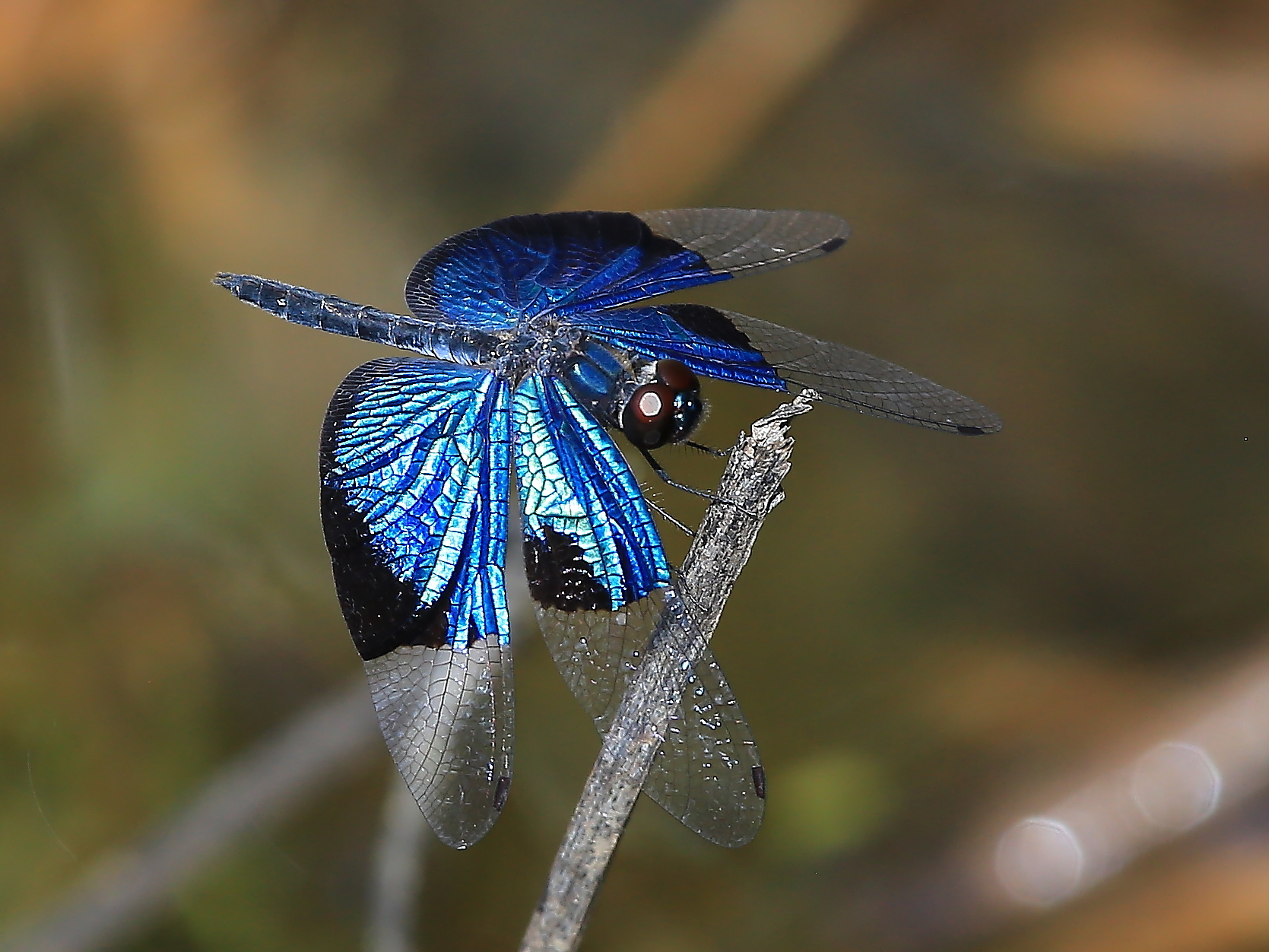
In Cairns, Queensland, Australia

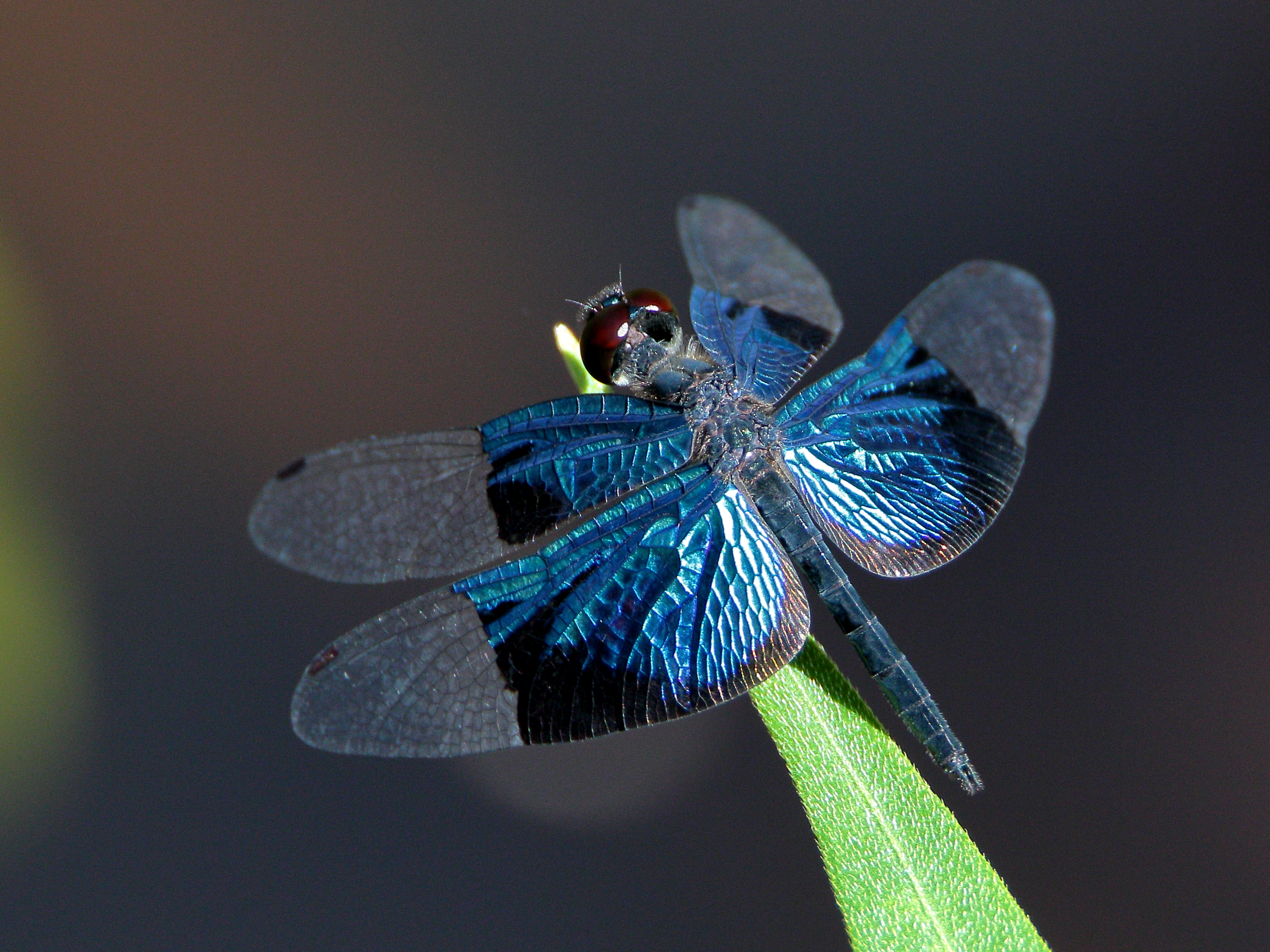
Cattana Wetlands, Cairns

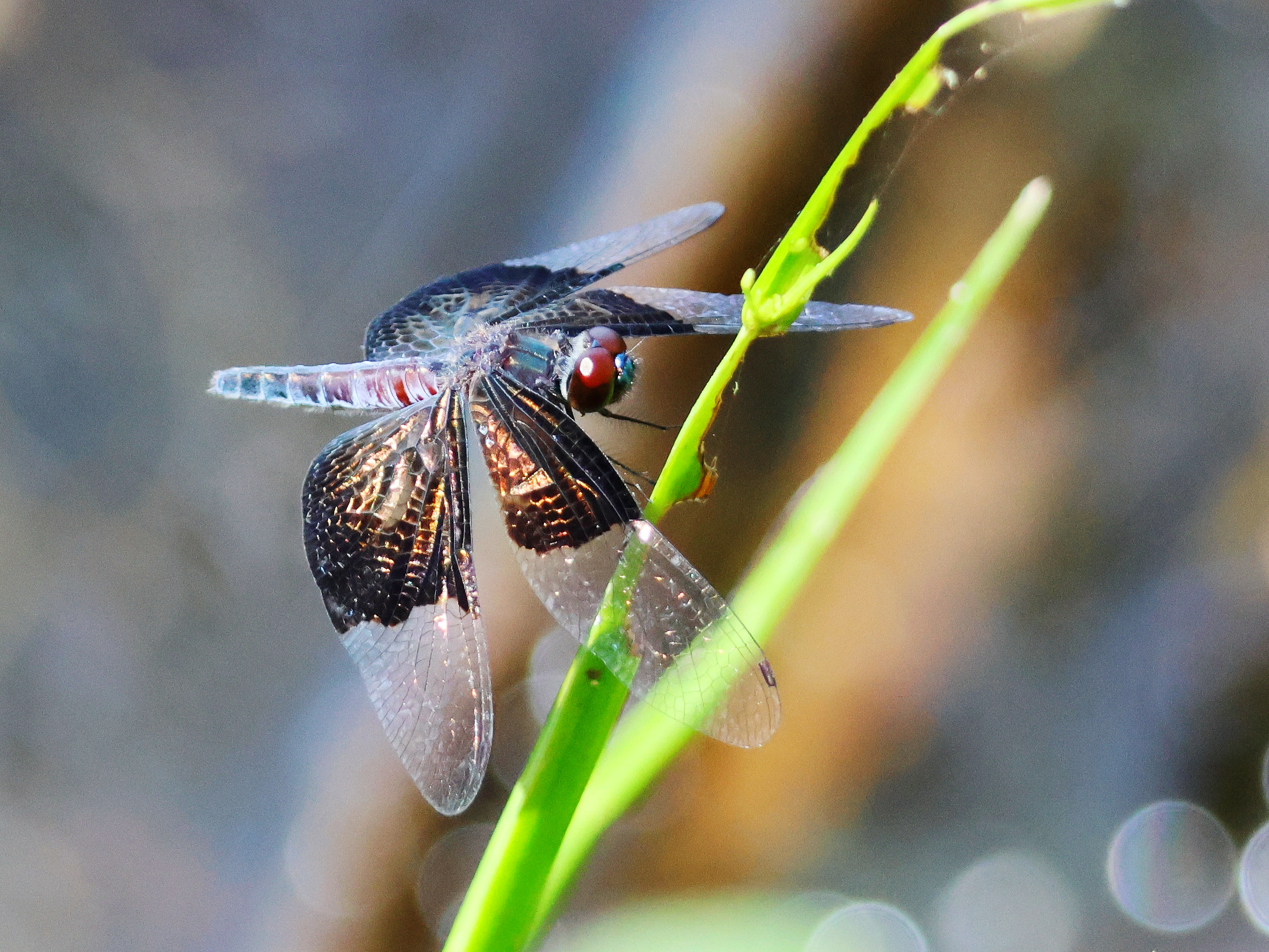
Female Cattana wetlands, Cairns

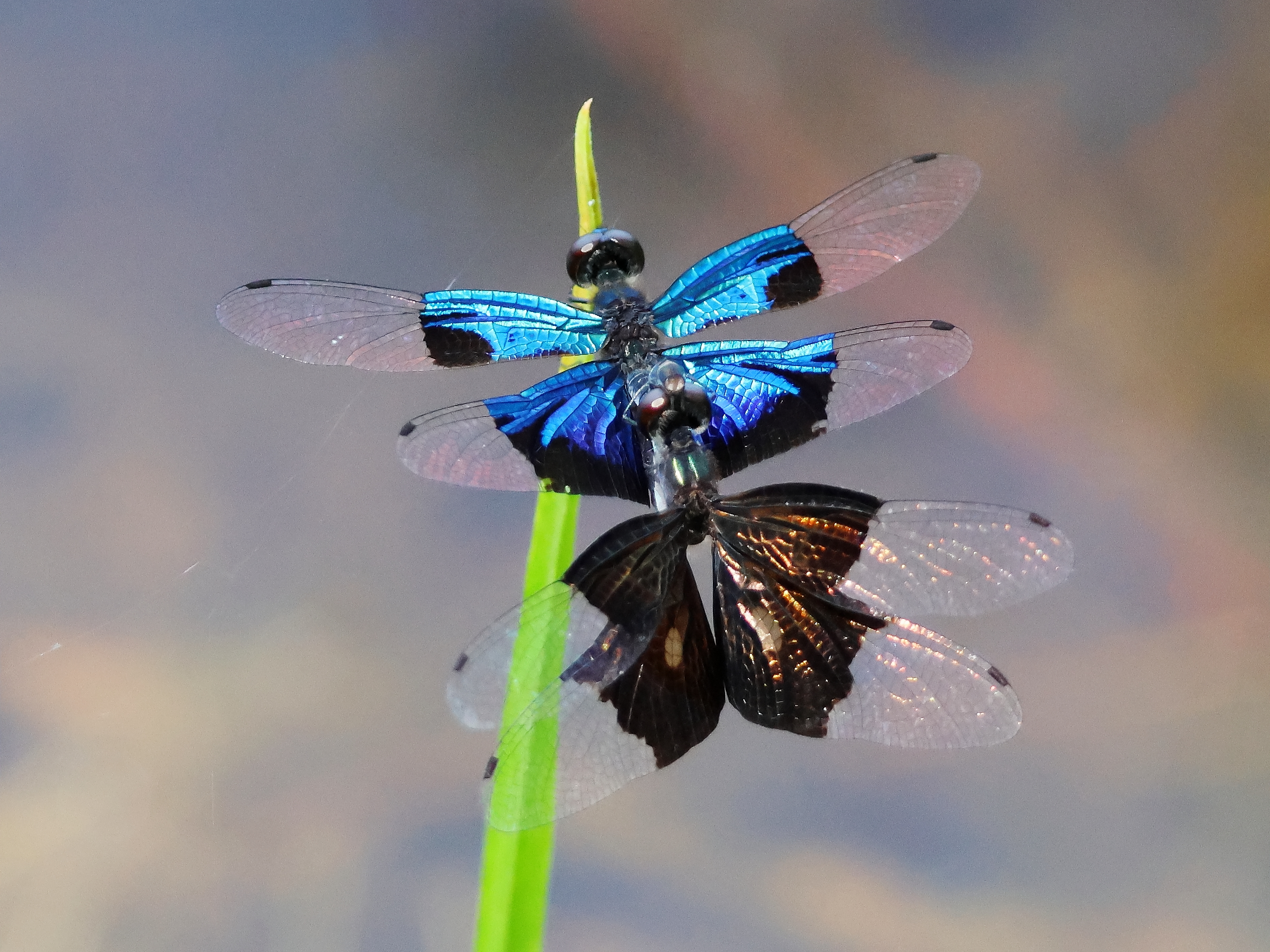
A male and female in cop. Male has blue wings, female has dark wings with a small clear patch.

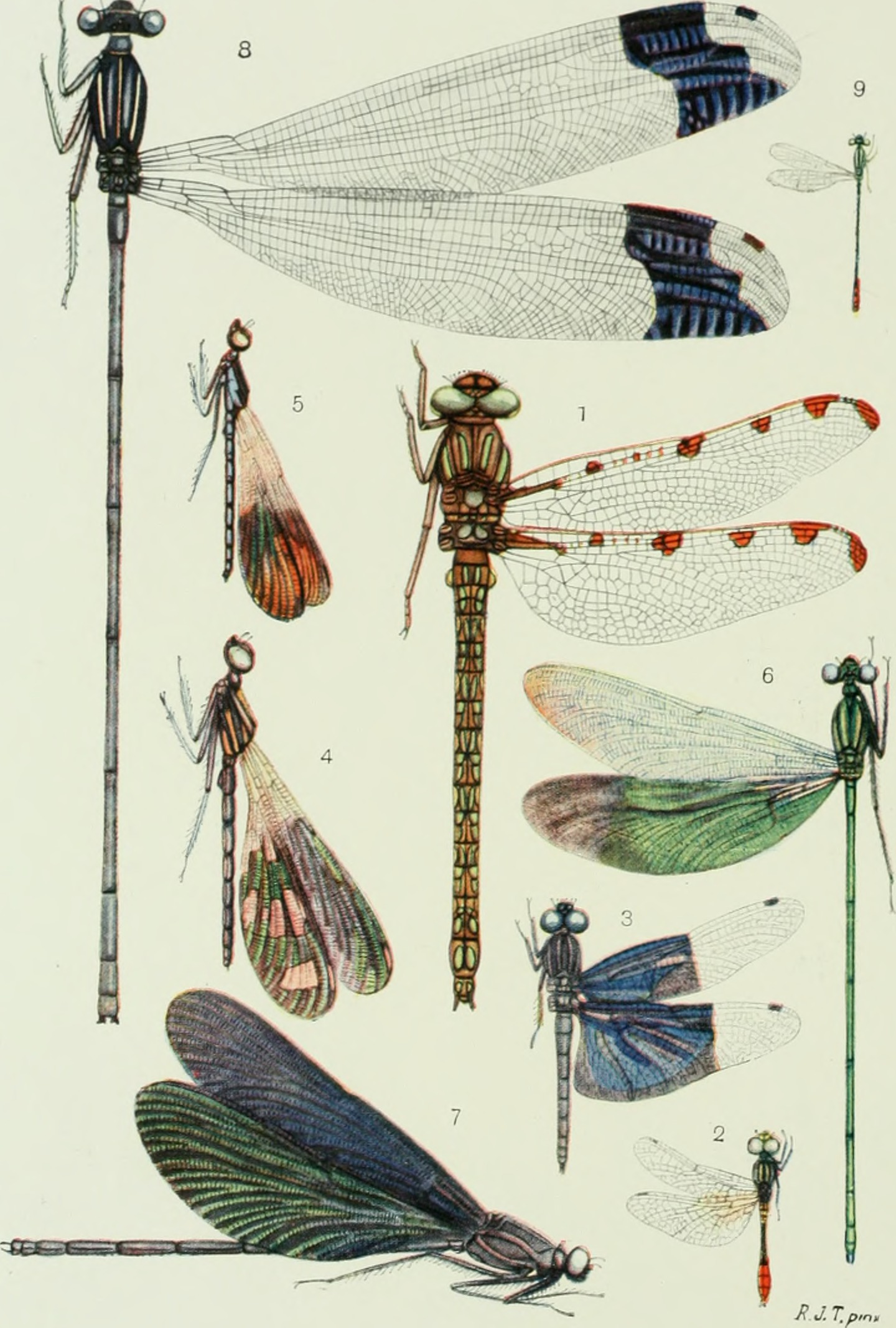
Figure 3. Male

Illustration of wing veins

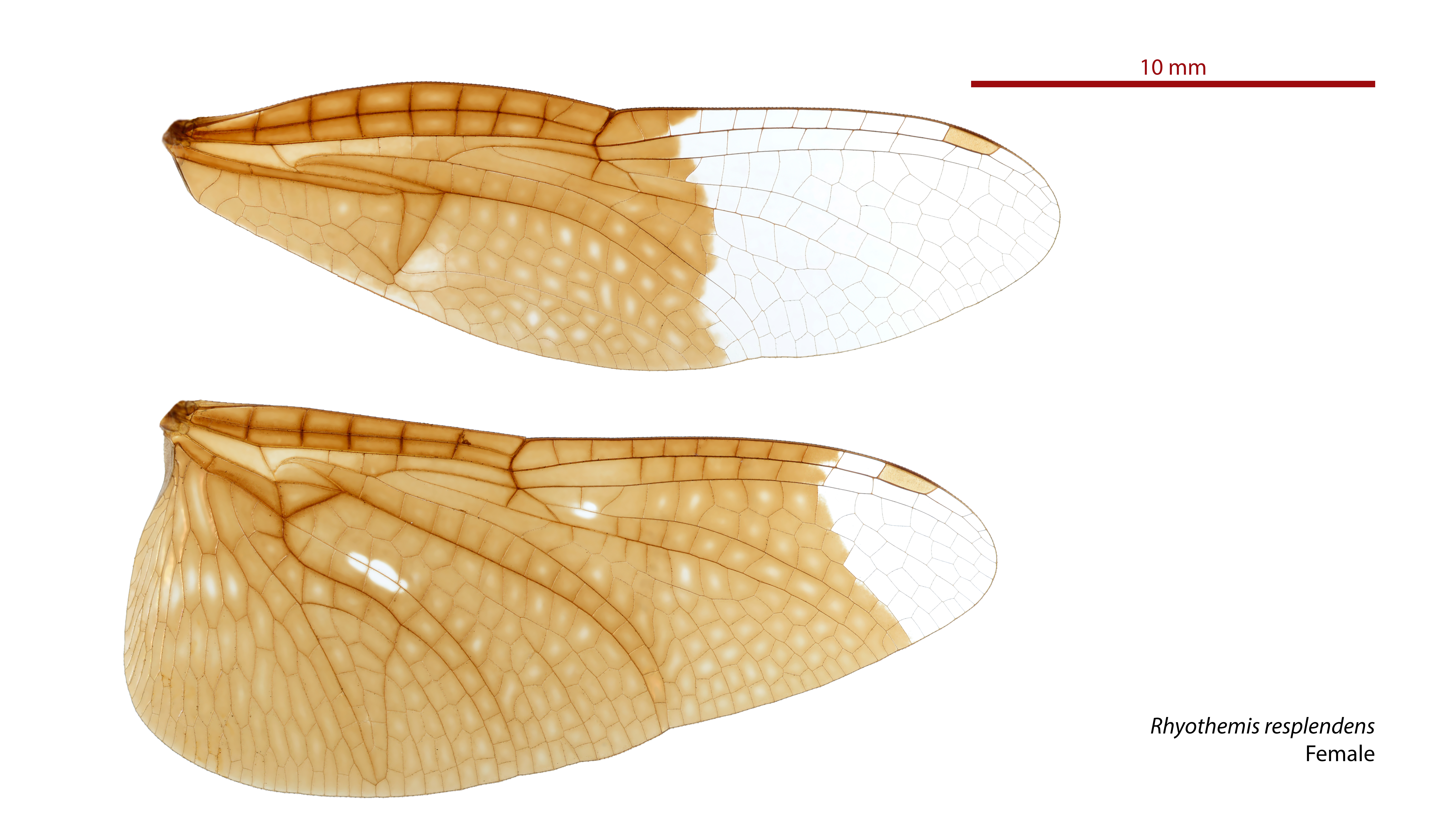
Photo of female wings

== See also ==
- List of Odonata species of Australia
