= List of leaders of the People's Republic of China =

This is a list of leaders of the People's Republic of China's Government institutions. Each institution of China is headed by a chairperson or secretary, with some being more prominent than others. The paramount leader holds the highest authority of the Chinese Communist Party (CCP) and Government of the People's Republic of China (PRC).

== Paramount leader ==
General Secretary of the Central Committee of the Chinese Communist Party
Xi Jinping	Institution	CCP Central Committee	The General Secretary is the highest-ranking official within the Chinese Communist Party, a standing member of the Politburo and head of the Secretariat. Post holders are usually the de facto leaders of the People's Republic of China. Currently, the General Secretary holds the authority of Paramount leader in China. Because China is a single-party state, the General Secretary holds the highest political position in the PRC and thus constitutes the most powerful position in China's government.
Xi Jinping	Current holder	Xi Jinping	The General Secretary is the highest-ranking official within the Chinese Communist Party, a standing member of the Politburo and head of the Secretariat. Post holders are usually the de facto leaders of the People's Republic of China. Currently, the General Secretary holds the authority of Paramount leader in China. Because China is a single-party state, the General Secretary holds the highest political position in the PRC and thus constitutes the most powerful position in China's government.
Xi Jinping	Birthplace	Beijing	The General Secretary is the highest-ranking official within the Chinese Communist Party, a standing member of the Politburo and head of the Secretariat. Post holders are usually the de facto leaders of the People's Republic of China. Currently, the General Secretary holds the authority of Paramount leader in China. Because China is a single-party state, the General Secretary holds the highest political position in the PRC and thus constitutes the most powerful position in China's government.
Xi Jinping	Constituency	Guangxi at-large	The General Secretary is the highest-ranking official within the Chinese Communist Party, a standing member of the Politburo and head of the Secretariat. Post holders are usually the de facto leaders of the People's Republic of China. Currently, the General Secretary holds the authority of Paramount leader in China. Because China is a single-party state, the General Secretary holds the highest political position in the PRC and thus constitutes the most powerful position in China's government.
Xi Jinping	Since	15 November 2012	The General Secretary is the highest-ranking official within the Chinese Communist Party, a standing member of the Politburo and head of the Secretariat. Post holders are usually the de facto leaders of the People's Republic of China. Currently, the General Secretary holds the authority of Paramount leader in China. Because China is a single-party state, the General Secretary holds the highest political position in the PRC and thus constitutes the most powerful position in China's government.

== State leaders ==
President of the People's Republic of China
Xi Jinping	Institution	Presidency	The President is legally China's state representative; he is responsible for China's image. The office is largely ceremonial, so the president cannot intervene directly in matters of the State Council. He, therefore, holds minor responsibilities such as greeting foreign dignitaries and signing the appointment of embassy staff. This position can be held whilst holding others.
Xi Jinping	Current holder	Xi Jinping	The President is legally China's state representative; he is responsible for China's image. The office is largely ceremonial, so the president cannot intervene directly in matters of the State Council. He, therefore, holds minor responsibilities such as greeting foreign dignitaries and signing the appointment of embassy staff. This position can be held whilst holding others.
Xi Jinping	Birthplace	Beijing, China	The President is legally China's state representative; he is responsible for China's image. The office is largely ceremonial, so the president cannot intervene directly in matters of the State Council. He, therefore, holds minor responsibilities such as greeting foreign dignitaries and signing the appointment of embassy staff. This position can be held whilst holding others.
Xi Jinping	Constituency	Jiangsu at-large	The President is legally China's state representative; he is responsible for China's image. The office is largely ceremonial, so the president cannot intervene directly in matters of the State Council. He, therefore, holds minor responsibilities such as greeting foreign dignitaries and signing the appointment of embassy staff. This position can be held whilst holding others.
Xi Jinping	Since	14 March 2013	The President is legally China's state representative; he is responsible for China's image. The office is largely ceremonial, so the president cannot intervene directly in matters of the State Council. He, therefore, holds minor responsibilities such as greeting foreign dignitaries and signing the appointment of embassy staff. This position can be held whilst holding others.
Premier of the State Council of the People's Republic of China
Li Qiang	Institution	State Council	The Premier is the highest administrative position in the Government of the People's Republic of China. The Premier is responsible for organizing and administering the Chinese civil bureaucracy. This includes overseeing the various ministries, departments, commissions and statutory agencies and announcing their candidacies to the National People's Congress for Vice Premiers, State Councillors and ministry offices.
Li Qiang	Current holder	Li Qiang	The Premier is the highest administrative position in the Government of the People's Republic of China. The Premier is responsible for organizing and administering the Chinese civil bureaucracy. This includes overseeing the various ministries, departments, commissions and statutory agencies and announcing their candidacies to the National People's Congress for Vice Premiers, State Councillors and ministry offices.
Li Qiang	Birthplace	Rui'an, Zhejiang	The Premier is the highest administrative position in the Government of the People's Republic of China. The Premier is responsible for organizing and administering the Chinese civil bureaucracy. This includes overseeing the various ministries, departments, commissions and statutory agencies and announcing their candidacies to the National People's Congress for Vice Premiers, State Councillors and ministry offices.
Li Qiang	Constituency	Yunnan at-large	The Premier is the highest administrative position in the Government of the People's Republic of China. The Premier is responsible for organizing and administering the Chinese civil bureaucracy. This includes overseeing the various ministries, departments, commissions and statutory agencies and announcing their candidacies to the National People's Congress for Vice Premiers, State Councillors and ministry offices.
Li Qiang	Since	11 March 2023	The Premier is the highest administrative position in the Government of the People's Republic of China. The Premier is responsible for organizing and administering the Chinese civil bureaucracy. This includes overseeing the various ministries, departments, commissions and statutory agencies and announcing their candidacies to the National People's Congress for Vice Premiers, State Councillors and ministry offices.
Chairman of the Standing Committee of the National People's Congress
Li Zhanshu	Institution	NPC	The Chairman of the Standing Committee of the National People's Congress presides over the plenary of Congress. The Chairman also chairs the Standing Committee of the National People's Congress as well as representing the speaker of Congress.
Li Zhanshu	Current holder	Zhao Leji	The Chairman of the Standing Committee of the National People's Congress presides over the plenary of Congress. The Chairman also chairs the Standing Committee of the National People's Congress as well as representing the speaker of Congress.
Li Zhanshu	Birthplace	Xining, Qinghai	The Chairman of the Standing Committee of the National People's Congress presides over the plenary of Congress. The Chairman also chairs the Standing Committee of the National People's Congress as well as representing the speaker of Congress.
Li Zhanshu	Constituency	Sichuan at-large	The Chairman of the Standing Committee of the National People's Congress presides over the plenary of Congress. The Chairman also chairs the Standing Committee of the National People's Congress as well as representing the speaker of Congress.
Li Zhanshu	Since	10 March 2023	The Chairman of the Standing Committee of the National People's Congress presides over the plenary of Congress. The Chairman also chairs the Standing Committee of the National People's Congress as well as representing the speaker of Congress.
Chairman of the National Committee of the Chinese People's Political Consultative Conference
Wang Huning	Institution	CPPCC	The Chairman of the National Committee of the Chinese People's Political Consultative Conference oversees the Conference. In practice, its role and powers are somewhat analogous to a speaker of a legislative upper house, and there have been occasional proposals to formalize this role in the PRC Constitution.
Wang Huning	Current holder	Wang Huning	The Chairman of the National Committee of the Chinese People's Political Consultative Conference oversees the Conference. In practice, its role and powers are somewhat analogous to a speaker of a legislative upper house, and there have been occasional proposals to formalize this role in the PRC Constitution.
Wang Huning	Birthplace	Shanghai	The Chairman of the National Committee of the Chinese People's Political Consultative Conference oversees the Conference. In practice, its role and powers are somewhat analogous to a speaker of a legislative upper house, and there have been occasional proposals to formalize this role in the PRC Constitution.
Wang Huning	Constituency	Guizhou at-large	The Chairman of the National Committee of the Chinese People's Political Consultative Conference oversees the Conference. In practice, its role and powers are somewhat analogous to a speaker of a legislative upper house, and there have been occasional proposals to formalize this role in the PRC Constitution.
Wang Huning	Since	10 March 2023	The Chairman of the National Committee of the Chinese People's Political Consultative Conference oversees the Conference. In practice, its role and powers are somewhat analogous to a speaker of a legislative upper house, and there have been occasional proposals to formalize this role in the PRC Constitution.
Chairman of the Central Military Commission of the People's Republic of China
Xi Jinping	Institution	PLA	The Chairman of the Central Military Commission of the People's Republic of China directs the armed forces of the country according to the Constitution.
Xi Jinping	Current holder	Xi Jinping	The Chairman of the Central Military Commission of the People's Republic of China directs the armed forces of the country according to the Constitution.
Xi Jinping	Birthplace	Beijing, China	The Chairman of the Central Military Commission of the People's Republic of China directs the armed forces of the country according to the Constitution.
Xi Jinping	Constituency	Jiangsu At-large	The Chairman of the Central Military Commission of the People's Republic of China directs the armed forces of the country according to the Constitution.
Xi Jinping	Since	14 March 2013	The Chairman of the Central Military Commission of the People's Republic of China directs the armed forces of the country according to the Constitution.
President of the Supreme People's Court of the People's Republic of China
Zhang Jun	Institution	SPC	The President of the Supreme People's Court of the People's Republic of China oversees the highest court in the mainland area of the People's Republic of China, not including Hong Kong or Macau.
Zhang Jun	Current holder	Zhang Jun	The President of the Supreme People's Court of the People's Republic of China oversees the highest court in the mainland area of the People's Republic of China, not including Hong Kong or Macau.
Zhang Jun	Birthplace	Boxing County, Shandong	The President of the Supreme People's Court of the People's Republic of China oversees the highest court in the mainland area of the People's Republic of China, not including Hong Kong or Macau.
Zhang Jun	Constituency	Hebei at-large	The President of the Supreme People's Court of the People's Republic of China oversees the highest court in the mainland area of the People's Republic of China, not including Hong Kong or Macau.
Zhang Jun	Since	11 March 2023	The President of the Supreme People's Court of the People's Republic of China oversees the highest court in the mainland area of the People's Republic of China, not including Hong Kong or Macau.
Procurator-General of the Supreme People's Procuratorate of the People's Republic of China
Ying Yong	Institution	Supreme People's Procuratorate	The Procurator-General of the Supreme People's Procuratorate of the People's Republic of China oversee the highest agency at the national level responsible for both prosecution and investigation in the People's Republic of China.
Ying Yong	Current holder	Ying Yong	The Procurator-General of the Supreme People's Procuratorate of the People's Republic of China oversee the highest agency at the national level responsible for both prosecution and investigation in the People's Republic of China.
Ying Yong	Birthplace	Xianju County, Zhejiang	The Procurator-General of the Supreme People's Procuratorate of the People's Republic of China oversee the highest agency at the national level responsible for both prosecution and investigation in the People's Republic of China.
Ying Yong	Constituency	Anhui at-large	The Procurator-General of the Supreme People's Procuratorate of the People's Republic of China oversee the highest agency at the national level responsible for both prosecution and investigation in the People's Republic of China.
Ying Yong	Since	11 March 2023	The Procurator-General of the Supreme People's Procuratorate of the People's Republic of China oversee the highest agency at the national level responsible for both prosecution and investigation in the People's Republic of China.
Director of the National Supervisory Commission of the People's Republic of China
	Institution	National Supervisory Commission	The Director of the National Supervisory Commission of the People's Republic of China oversee the highest agency at the national level responsible for supervision and anti-corruption
	Current holder	Liu Jinguo	The Director of the National Supervisory Commission of the People's Republic of China oversee the highest agency at the national level responsible for supervision and anti-corruption
	Birthplace	Changli County, Hebei	The Director of the National Supervisory Commission of the People's Republic of China oversee the highest agency at the national level responsible for supervision and anti-corruption
	Constituency	Ningxia at-large	The Director of the National Supervisory Commission of the People's Republic of China oversee the highest agency at the national level responsible for supervision and anti-corruption
	Since	11 March 2023	The Director of the National Supervisory Commission of the People's Republic of China oversee the highest agency at the national level responsible for supervision and anti-corruption

== Vice President ==
Vice President of the People's Republic of China
Han Zheng	Institution	Presidency	The Vice President's duties include assisting the President and replacing him should he resign or die in office. In reality, the position of the Vice President is basically ceremonial, and only until Hu Jintao, recent vice presidents have been members of the Politburo Standing Committee, China's main decision makers.
Han Zheng	Current holder	Han Zheng	The Vice President's duties include assisting the President and replacing him should he resign or die in office. In reality, the position of the Vice President is basically ceremonial, and only until Hu Jintao, recent vice presidents have been members of the Politburo Standing Committee, China's main decision makers.
Han Zheng	Birthplace	Shanghai	The Vice President's duties include assisting the President and replacing him should he resign or die in office. In reality, the position of the Vice President is basically ceremonial, and only until Hu Jintao, recent vice presidents have been members of the Politburo Standing Committee, China's main decision makers.
Han Zheng	Constituency	Shandong at-large	The Vice President's duties include assisting the President and replacing him should he resign or die in office. In reality, the position of the Vice President is basically ceremonial, and only until Hu Jintao, recent vice presidents have been members of the Politburo Standing Committee, China's main decision makers.
Han Zheng	Since	10 March 2023	The Vice President's duties include assisting the President and replacing him should he resign or die in office. In reality, the position of the Vice President is basically ceremonial, and only until Hu Jintao, recent vice presidents have been members of the Politburo Standing Committee, China's main decision makers.

== Vice Premiers ==
Portrait	Information		Posts
Ding Xuexiang	Rank	1st	Member of the Politburo Standing Committee (6th Ranked) Development and reform, education, science and technology, finance, ecology and environment, statistics, and intellectual property
Ding Xuexiang	Name	Ding Xuexiang	Member of the Politburo Standing Committee (6th Ranked) Development and reform, education, science and technology, finance, ecology and environment, statistics, and intellectual property
Ding Xuexiang	Constituency	Liaoning At-large	Member of the Politburo Standing Committee (6th Ranked) Development and reform, education, science and technology, finance, ecology and environment, statistics, and intellectual property
Ding Xuexiang	Birthplace	Nantong, Jiangsu	Member of the Politburo Standing Committee (6th Ranked) Development and reform, education, science and technology, finance, ecology and environment, statistics, and intellectual property
Ding Xuexiang	Took office	12 March 2023	Member of the Politburo Standing Committee (6th Ranked) Development and reform, education, science and technology, finance, ecology and environment, statistics, and intellectual property
He Lifeng	Rank	2nd	Member of the Politburo Public finance, natural resource management, housing and urban development, transportation, commerce
He Lifeng	Name	He Lifeng	Member of the Politburo Public finance, natural resource management, housing and urban development, transportation, commerce
He Lifeng	Constituency	Inner Mongolia At-large	Member of the Politburo Public finance, natural resource management, housing and urban development, transportation, commerce
He Lifeng	Birthplace	Xingning, Guangdong	Member of the Politburo Public finance, natural resource management, housing and urban development, transportation, commerce
He Lifeng	Took office	12 March 2023	Member of the Politburo Public finance, natural resource management, housing and urban development, transportation, commerce
Zhang Guoqing	Rank	3rd	Member of the Politburo Industry and information technology, emergency management, and state-owned enterprises
Zhang Guoqing	Name	Zhang Guoqing	Member of the Politburo Industry and information technology, emergency management, and state-owned enterprises
Zhang Guoqing	Constituency	Tibet At-large	Member of the Politburo Industry and information technology, emergency management, and state-owned enterprises
Zhang Guoqing	Birthplace	Luoshan County, Henan	Member of the Politburo Industry and information technology, emergency management, and state-owned enterprises
Zhang Guoqing	Took office	12 March 2023	Member of the Politburo Industry and information technology, emergency management, and state-owned enterprises
Liu Guozhong	Rank	4th	Member of the Politburo Agriculture and rural affairs, health, poverty alleviation, and meteorology
Liu Guozhong	Name	Liu Guozhong	Member of the Politburo Agriculture and rural affairs, health, poverty alleviation, and meteorology
Liu Guozhong	Constituency	Henan At-large	Member of the Politburo Agriculture and rural affairs, health, poverty alleviation, and meteorology
Liu Guozhong	Birthplace	Wangkui County, Heilongjiang	Member of the Politburo Agriculture and rural affairs, health, poverty alleviation, and meteorology
Liu Guozhong	Took office	12 March 2023	Member of the Politburo Agriculture and rural affairs, health, poverty alleviation, and meteorology

== Historic office holders ==
Year	Paramount leader	President	Premier	NPCSC Chairman	NC CPPCC Chairman	CCP CMC Chairman	SPC President	SPP Procurators-General
1949	1: Mao Zedong		1: Zhou Enlai		1: Mao Zedong		1: Shen Junru	1: Luo Ronghuan
1950	1: Mao Zedong		1: Zhou Enlai		1: Mao Zedong		1: Shen Junru	1: Luo Ronghuan
1951	1: Mao Zedong		1: Zhou Enlai		1: Mao Zedong		1: Shen Junru	1: Luo Ronghuan
1952	1: Mao Zedong		1: Zhou Enlai		1: Mao Zedong		1: Shen Junru	1: Luo Ronghuan
1953	1: Mao Zedong		1: Zhou Enlai		1: Mao Zedong		1: Shen Junru	1: Luo Ronghuan
1954	1: Mao Zedong	1: Mao Zedong	1: Zhou Enlai	1: Liu Shaoqi	1: Mao Zedong	1: Mao Zedong	2: Dong Biwu	2: Zhang Dingcheng
1955	1: Mao Zedong	1: Mao Zedong	1: Zhou Enlai	1: Liu Shaoqi	2: Zhou Enlai	1: Mao Zedong	2: Dong Biwu	2: Zhang Dingcheng
1956	1: Mao Zedong	1: Mao Zedong	1: Zhou Enlai	1: Liu Shaoqi	2: Zhou Enlai	1: Mao Zedong	2: Dong Biwu	2: Zhang Dingcheng
1957	1: Mao Zedong	1: Mao Zedong	1: Zhou Enlai	1: Liu Shaoqi	2: Zhou Enlai	1: Mao Zedong	2: Dong Biwu	2: Zhang Dingcheng
1958	1: Mao Zedong	1: Mao Zedong	1: Zhou Enlai	1: Liu Shaoqi	2: Zhou Enlai	1: Mao Zedong	2: Dong Biwu	2: Zhang Dingcheng
1959	1: Mao Zedong	1: Mao Zedong	1: Zhou Enlai	1: Liu Shaoqi	2: Zhou Enlai	1: Mao Zedong	3: Xie Juezai	2: Zhang Dingcheng
1960	1: Mao Zedong	2: Liu Shaoqi	1: Zhou Enlai	2: Zhu De	2: Zhou Enlai	1: Mao Zedong	3: Xie Juezai	2: Zhang Dingcheng
1961	1: Mao Zedong	2: Liu Shaoqi	1: Zhou Enlai	2: Zhu De	2: Zhou Enlai	1: Mao Zedong	3: Xie Juezai	2: Zhang Dingcheng
1962	1: Mao Zedong	2: Liu Shaoqi	1: Zhou Enlai	2: Zhu De	2: Zhou Enlai	1: Mao Zedong	3: Xie Juezai	2: Zhang Dingcheng
1963	1: Mao Zedong	2: Liu Shaoqi	1: Zhou Enlai	2: Zhu De	2: Zhou Enlai	1: Mao Zedong	3: Xie Juezai	2: Zhang Dingcheng
1964	1: Mao Zedong	2: Liu Shaoqi	1: Zhou Enlai	2: Zhu De	2: Zhou Enlai	1: Mao Zedong	3: Xie Juezai	2: Zhang Dingcheng
1965	1: Mao Zedong	2: Liu Shaoqi	1: Zhou Enlai	2: Zhu De	2: Zhou Enlai	1: Mao Zedong	4: Yang Xiufeng	2: Zhang Dingcheng
1966	1: Mao Zedong	2: Liu Shaoqi	1: Zhou Enlai	2: Zhu De	2: Zhou Enlai	1: Mao Zedong	4: Yang Xiufeng	2: Zhang Dingcheng
1967	1: Mao Zedong	2: Liu Shaoqi	1: Zhou Enlai	2: Zhu De	2: Zhou Enlai	1: Mao Zedong	4: Yang Xiufeng	2: Zhang Dingcheng
1968	1: Mao Zedong	2: Liu Shaoqi	1: Zhou Enlai	2: Zhu De	2: Zhou Enlai	1: Mao Zedong	4: Yang Xiufeng	2: Zhang Dingcheng
1969	1: Mao Zedong	2½: Song Qingling & Dong Biwu (acting)	1: Zhou Enlai	2: Zhu De	2: Zhou Enlai	1: Mao Zedong	4: Yang Xiufeng	2: Zhang Dingcheng
1970	1: Mao Zedong	2½: Song Qingling & Dong Biwu (acting)	1: Zhou Enlai	2: Zhu De	2: Zhou Enlai	1: Mao Zedong	4: Yang Xiufeng	2: Zhang Dingcheng
1971	1: Mao Zedong	2½: Song Qingling & Dong Biwu (acting)	1: Zhou Enlai	2: Zhu De	2: Zhou Enlai	1: Mao Zedong	4: Yang Xiufeng	2: Zhang Dingcheng
1972	1: Mao Zedong	2½: Song Qingling & Dong Biwu (acting)	1: Zhou Enlai	2: Zhu De	2: Zhou Enlai	1: Mao Zedong	4: Yang Xiufeng	2: Zhang Dingcheng
1973	1: Mao Zedong	2½: Dong Biwu (acting)	1: Zhou Enlai	2: Zhu De	2: Zhou Enlai	1: Mao Zedong	4: Yang Xiufeng	2: Zhang Dingcheng
1974	1: Mao Zedong	2½: Dong Biwu (acting)	1: Zhou Enlai	2: Zhu De	2: Zhou Enlai	1: Mao Zedong	4: Yang Xiufeng	2: Zhang Dingcheng
1975	1: Mao Zedong	2½: Dong Biwu (acting)	1: Zhou Enlai	2: Zhu De	2: Zhou Enlai	1: Mao Zedong	5: Jiang Hua	
1976	2: Hua Guofeng	Abolition	2: Hua Guofeng	2½: Song Qingling (acting)		2: Hua Guofeng	5: Jiang Hua	
1977	2: Hua Guofeng	Abolition	2: Hua Guofeng	2½: Song Qingling (acting)		2: Hua Guofeng	5: Jiang Hua	
1978	3: Deng Xiaoping	Abolition	2: Hua Guofeng	3: Ye Jianying	3: Deng Xiaoping	2: Hua Guofeng	5: Jiang Hua	3: Huang Huoqing
1979	3: Deng Xiaoping	Abolition	2: Hua Guofeng	3: Ye Jianying	3: Deng Xiaoping	2: Hua Guofeng	5: Jiang Hua	3: Huang Huoqing
1980	3: Deng Xiaoping	Abolition	2: Hua Guofeng	3: Ye Jianying	3: Deng Xiaoping	2: Hua Guofeng	5: Jiang Hua	3: Huang Huoqing
1981	3: Deng Xiaoping	2½: Song Qingling (honorary)	3: Zhao Ziyang	3: Ye Jianying	3: Deng Xiaoping	3: Deng Xiaoping	5: Jiang Hua	3: Huang Huoqing
1982	3: Deng Xiaoping		3: Zhao Ziyang	3: Ye Jianying	3: Deng Xiaoping	3: Deng Xiaoping	5: Jiang Hua	3: Huang Huoqing
1983	3: Deng Xiaoping	3: Li Xiannian	3: Zhao Ziyang	4: Peng Zhen	3: Deng Yingchao	3: Deng Xiaoping	6: Zheng Tianxiang	4: Yang Yichen
1984	3: Deng Xiaoping	3: Li Xiannian	3: Zhao Ziyang	4: Peng Zhen	3: Deng Yingchao	3: Deng Xiaoping	6: Zheng Tianxiang	4: Yang Yichen
1985	3: Deng Xiaoping	3: Li Xiannian	3: Zhao Ziyang	4: Peng Zhen	3: Deng Yingchao	3: Deng Xiaoping	6: Zheng Tianxiang	4: Yang Yichen
1986	3: Deng Xiaoping	3: Li Xiannian	3: Zhao Ziyang	4: Peng Zhen	3: Deng Yingchao	3: Deng Xiaoping	6: Zheng Tianxiang	4: Yang Yichen
1987	3: Deng Xiaoping	3: Li Xiannian	3: Zhao Ziyang	4: Peng Zhen	3: Deng Yingchao	3: Deng Xiaoping	6: Zheng Tianxiang	4: Yang Yichen
1988	3: Deng Xiaoping	4: Yang Shangkun	4: Li Peng	5: Wan Li	5: Li Xiannian	3: Deng Xiaoping	7: Ren Jianxin	5: Liu Fuzhi
1989	4: Jiang Zemin	4: Yang Shangkun	4: Li Peng	5: Wan Li	5: Li Xiannian	4: Jiang Zemin	7: Ren Jianxin	5: Liu Fuzhi
1990	4: Jiang Zemin	4: Yang Shangkun	4: Li Peng	5: Wan Li	5: Li Xiannian	4: Jiang Zemin	7: Ren Jianxin	5: Liu Fuzhi
1991	4: Jiang Zemin	4: Yang Shangkun	4: Li Peng	5: Wan Li	5: Li Xiannian	4: Jiang Zemin	7: Ren Jianxin	5: Liu Fuzhi
1992	4: Jiang Zemin	4: Yang Shangkun	4: Li Peng	5: Wan Li		4: Jiang Zemin	7: Ren Jianxin	5: Liu Fuzhi
1993	4: Jiang Zemin	5: Jiang Zemin	4: Li Peng	6: Qiao Shi	6: Li Ruihuan	4: Jiang Zemin	7: Ren Jianxin	6: Zhang Siqing
1994	4: Jiang Zemin	5: Jiang Zemin	4: Li Peng	6: Qiao Shi	6: Li Ruihuan	4: Jiang Zemin	7: Ren Jianxin	6: Zhang Siqing
1995	4: Jiang Zemin	5: Jiang Zemin	4: Li Peng	6: Qiao Shi	6: Li Ruihuan	4: Jiang Zemin	7: Ren Jianxin	6: Zhang Siqing
1996	4: Jiang Zemin	5: Jiang Zemin	4: Li Peng	6: Qiao Shi	6: Li Ruihuan	4: Jiang Zemin	7: Ren Jianxin	6: Zhang Siqing
1997	4: Jiang Zemin	5: Jiang Zemin	4: Li Peng	6: Qiao Shi	6: Li Ruihuan	4: Jiang Zemin	7: Ren Jianxin	6: Zhang Siqing
1998	4: Jiang Zemin	5: Jiang Zemin	5: Zhu Rongji	7: Li Peng	6: Li Ruihuan	4: Jiang Zemin	8: Xiao Yang	7: Han Zhubin
1999	4: Jiang Zemin	5: Jiang Zemin	5: Zhu Rongji	7: Li Peng	6: Li Ruihuan	4: Jiang Zemin	8: Xiao Yang	7: Han Zhubin
2000	4: Jiang Zemin	5: Jiang Zemin	5: Zhu Rongji	7: Li Peng	6: Li Ruihuan	4: Jiang Zemin	8: Xiao Yang	7: Han Zhubin
2001	4: Jiang Zemin	5: Jiang Zemin	5: Zhu Rongji	7: Li Peng	6: Li Ruihuan	4: Jiang Zemin	8: Xiao Yang	7: Han Zhubin
2002	5: Hu Jintao	5: Jiang Zemin	5: Zhu Rongji	7: Li Peng	6: Li Ruihuan	4: Jiang Zemin	8: Xiao Yang	7: Han Zhubin
2003	5: Hu Jintao	6: Hu Jintao	6: Wen Jiabao	8: Wu Bangguo	6: Jia Qinglin	4: Jiang Zemin	8: Xiao Yang	8: Jia Chunwang
2004	5: Hu Jintao	6: Hu Jintao	6: Wen Jiabao	8: Wu Bangguo	6: Jia Qinglin	5: Hu Jintao	8: Xiao Yang	8: Jia Chunwang
2005	5: Hu Jintao	6: Hu Jintao	6: Wen Jiabao	8: Wu Bangguo	6: Jia Qinglin	5: Hu Jintao	8: Xiao Yang	8: Jia Chunwang
2006	5: Hu Jintao	6: Hu Jintao	6: Wen Jiabao	8: Wu Bangguo	6: Jia Qinglin	5: Hu Jintao	8: Xiao Yang	8: Jia Chunwang
2007	5: Hu Jintao	6: Hu Jintao	6: Wen Jiabao	8: Wu Bangguo	6: Jia Qinglin	5: Hu Jintao	8: Xiao Yang	8: Jia Chunwang
2008	5: Hu Jintao	6: Hu Jintao	6: Wen Jiabao	8: Wu Bangguo	6: Jia Qinglin	5: Hu Jintao	9: Wang Shengjun	9: Cao Jianming
2009	5: Hu Jintao	6: Hu Jintao	6: Wen Jiabao	8: Wu Bangguo	6: Jia Qinglin	5: Hu Jintao	9: Wang Shengjun	9: Cao Jianming
2010	5: Hu Jintao	6: Hu Jintao	6: Wen Jiabao	8: Wu Bangguo	6: Jia Qinglin	5: Hu Jintao	9: Wang Shengjun	9: Cao Jianming
2011	5: Hu Jintao	6: Hu Jintao	6: Wen Jiabao	8: Wu Bangguo	6: Jia Qinglin	5: Hu Jintao	9: Wang Shengjun	9: Cao Jianming
2012	6: Xi Jinping	6: Hu Jintao	6: Wen Jiabao	8: Wu Bangguo	6: Jia Qinglin	6: Xi Jinping	9: Wang Shengjun	9: Cao Jianming
2013	6: Xi Jinping	7: Xi Jinping	7: Li Keqiang	9: Zhang Dejiang	7: Yu Zhengsheng	6: Xi Jinping	10: Zhou Qiang	9: Cao Jianming
2014	6: Xi Jinping	7: Xi Jinping	7: Li Keqiang	9: Zhang Dejiang	7: Yu Zhengsheng	6: Xi Jinping	10: Zhou Qiang	9: Cao Jianming
2015	6: Xi Jinping	7: Xi Jinping	7: Li Keqiang	9: Zhang Dejiang	7: Yu Zhengsheng	6: Xi Jinping	10: Zhou Qiang	9: Cao Jianming
2016	6: Xi Jinping	7: Xi Jinping	7: Li Keqiang	9: Zhang Dejiang	7: Yu Zhengsheng	6: Xi Jinping	10: Zhou Qiang	9: Cao Jianming
2017	6: Xi Jinping	7: Xi Jinping	7: Li Keqiang	9: Zhang Dejiang	7: Yu Zhengsheng	6: Xi Jinping	10: Zhou Qiang	9: Cao Jianming
2018	6: Xi Jinping	7: Xi Jinping	7: Li Keqiang	10: Li Zhanshu	7: Wang Yang	6: Xi Jinping	10: Zhou Qiang	10: Zhang Jun
2019	6: Xi Jinping	7: Xi Jinping	7: Li Keqiang	10: Li Zhanshu	7: Wang Yang	6: Xi Jinping	10: Zhou Qiang	10: Zhang Jun
2020	6: Xi Jinping	7: Xi Jinping	7: Li Keqiang	10: Li Zhanshu	7: Wang Yang	6: Xi Jinping	10: Zhou Qiang	10: Zhang Jun
2021	6: Xi Jinping	7: Xi Jinping	7: Li Keqiang	10: Li Zhanshu	7: Wang Yang	6: Xi Jinping	10: Zhou Qiang	10: Zhang Jun
2022	6: Xi Jinping	7: Xi Jinping	7: Li Keqiang	10: Li Zhanshu	7: Wang Yang	6: Xi Jinping	10: Zhou Qiang	10: Zhang Jun
2023	6: Xi Jinping	7: Xi Jinping	8: Li Qiang	11: Zhao Leji	8: Wang Huning	6: Xi Jinping	11: Zhang Jun	11: Ying Yong
2024	6: Xi Jinping	7: Xi Jinping	8: Li Qiang	11: Zhao Leji	8: Wang Huning	6: Xi Jinping	11: Zhang Jun	11: Ying Yong

== See also ==
- Generations of Chinese leadership
- Leadership core
- List of Chinese leaders
- List of leaders of the Republic of China
- List of national leaders of the People's Republic of China
- List of presidents of China
- List of state representatives of the People's Republic of China
- Succession of power in China
