= Zou Yu =

Chinese politician (born 1920)

- 邹瑜
- Born: 10 October 1920 (age 105); Bobai County, Guangxi, China
- Occupation: Politician
- Political party: Chinese Communist Party

Zou Yu (simplified Chinese: 邹瑜; traditional Chinese: 鄒瑜; pinyin: Zōu Yú; born 10 October 1920) is a politician of the People's Republic of China.

== Biography ==
Zou Yu joined the Chinese Communist Party in 1938. In 1978, Zou Yu assumed the role of Director of the China Earthquake Administration. He subsequently became a member of the Central Political and Legal Affairs Commission of the Central Committee of the Chinese Communist Party, serving as Deputy Secretary-General; Vice-Minister of Justice, and was elevated to Minister of Justice in 1983. In 1984, he concurrently held the position of President of the China University of Political Science and Law, before resigning from both roles in 1988. That same year, he assumed the role of Vice-Chairman of the Committee on Internal and Judicial Affairs (Chinese: 内务司法委员会) of the National People's Congress, and in 1991, he became President of the China Law Society, a position he maintained until 1997.

Zou turned 100 on 10 October 2020.

== Sources ==
- (in Chinese) Biography of Zou Yu

Government offices
Preceded by Liu Fuzhi	Minister of Justice; 1983–1988	Succeeded by Cai Cheng
Academic offices
Preceded by Liu Fuzhi	President of China University of Political Science and Law; 1984–1988	Succeeded by Jiang Ping
Preceded by Wang Zhongfang	President of China Law Society; 1991–1997	Succeeded by Ren Jianxin
