= Cai Dingjian =

Chinese constitutional law scholar

Cai Dingjian (Chinese: 蔡定剑; pinyin: Cài Dìngjiàn; October 9, 1956 – November 22, 2010) was a Chinese constitutional law scholar.

== Biography ==
Cai received his Bachelor of Laws degree from the China University of Political Science and Law in 1983, and Master of Laws degree and Doctor of Laws degree from Peking University in 1986 and 1998.

Cai was a professor at the China University of Political Science and Law and was selected as one of the "Ten Outstanding Young Jurists" by the China Law Society in 2002.
