= Commissioner General (China) =

Senior most police rank in China

Commissioner General or General Commissioner (Chinese: 总警监; pinyin: zǒng jǐng jiān) is the highest police rank in the People's Police of China. The Premier of the State Council confers the rank on individuals appointed at the ministerial level.

The uniform shirt of a Commissioner General is white, as with other senior ranks of the People's Police, and the emblem on the shoulder boards is that of the national emblem of China surrounded by olive branches.

== Use ==
Since Tao Siju, successive Ministers of Public Security and Ministers of State Security have been awarded the rank of Commissioner General upon entry into office.

== List of Commissioners General ==
1. Tao Siju – Awarded in September 1992, then Minister of Public Security
2. Gu Linfang – Awarded in September 1992, he served as Secretary-General of the Central Political and Legal Affairs Commission and Executive Vice Minister of the Ministry of Public Security
3. Jia Chunwang – Awarded in September 1992, then Minister of State Security
4. Xu Yongyue – Awarded in March 1998, then Minister of State Security
5. Zhou Yongkang – Awarded in December 2002, when he was a member of the Politburo of the Chinese Communist Party, deputy secretary of the Central Political and Legal Affairs Commission, and Minister of Public Security. Expelled from the CCP in December 2014, imprisoned for life.
6. Meng Jianzhu – Awarded in October 2007, then Minister of Public Security
7. Geng Huichang – Promoted in 2008, then Minister of State Security
8. Guo Shengkun – Awarded in December 2012, then Minister of Public Security
9. Chen Wenqing – awarded in November 2016, then Minister of State Security
10. Zhao Kezhi – Awarded in November 2017, then Minister of Public Security
11. Wang Xiaohong – Awarded in June 2022, then and current Minister of Public Security
12. Chen Yixin – Awarded in October 2022, then and current Minister of State Security

== See also ==
- Commissioner general
