= Tong Jianming =

Chinese politician

- 童建明
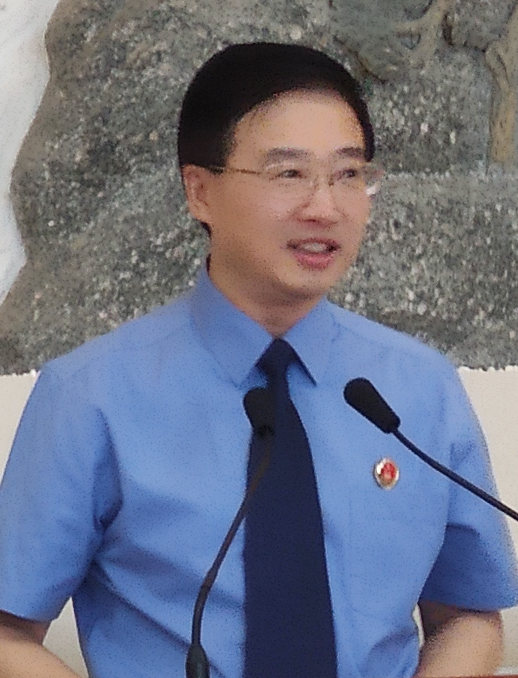
- Tong in 2019

Executive Deputy Procurator of the Supreme People's Procuratorate
- Incumbent
- Assumed office 20 May 2020
- Procurator: Zhang Jun
- Preceded by: Qiu Xueqiang

Personal details
- Born: June 1963 (age 63) Chun'an County, Zhejiang, China
- Party: Chinese Communist Party
- Education: Renmin University of China

Tong Jianming (Chinese: 童建明; pinyin: Tóng Jiànmíng; born June 1963) is a Chinese procurator and politician, currently serving as executive deputy procurator of the Supreme People's Procuratorate.

He is a member of the 20th Central Committee of the Chinese Communist Party.

== Biography ==
Tong was born in Chun'an County, Zhejiang, in June 1963. In 1980, he entered the Renmin University of China, where he majored in law. He joined the Chinese Communist Party (CCP) in November 1985.

After university in 1986, Tong was despatched to the Supreme People's Procuratorate, where he successively worked as assistant director, deputy director, and director of Public Office.

In December 2012, Tong was transferred to north China's Hebei province and was named acting procurator of the Hebei Provincial People's Procuratorate in January 2013, and confirmed in February. He was appointed secretary-general of the CCP Hebei Provincial Committee in July 2017 and was admitted to member of the Standing Committee of the CCP Hebei Provincial Committee, the province's top authority.

In June 2018, Tong was recalled as deputy procurator of the Supreme People's Procuratorate, and was elevated to executive deputy procurator in May 2020.

== Book ==
- Tong Jianming; Wan Chun (万春) (2008). 中国检察体制改革论纲 [On the Reform of China's Procuratorial System] (in Chinese). Beijing: China Prosecutorial Publishing House. ISBN 9787801859105.

Party political offices
Preceded by Zhang Deli (张德利)	Procurator of the Hebei Provincial People's Procuratorate; 2013–2017	Succeeded by Ding Shunsheng
Preceded by Qiu Xueqiang	Executive Deputy Procurator of the Supreme People's Procuratorate; 2020–	Incumbent
Party political offices
Preceded by Shang Liguang	Secretary-General of the Hebei Provincial Committee of the Chinese Communist Party; 2017–2018	Succeeded by Gao Zhili
