= Qiu Xueqiang =

- 邱学强

Deputy Chief Procurator of the Supreme People's Procuratorate
- In office June 2001 – October 2007
- Chief Procurator: Han Zhubin; Jia Chunwang

Personal details
- Born: August 1957 (age 68) Shen County, Shandong, China
- Party: Chinese Communist Party
- Education: Qinghai Radio and Television University; Central Party School of the Chinese Communist Party

Chinese name
- Simplified Chinese: 邱学强
- Traditional Chinese: 邱學強
Transcriptions
Standard Mandarin
- Hanyu Pinyin: Qiū Xuéqiáng

Qiu Xueqiang (Chinese: 邱学强; born August 1957) is a Chinese prosecutor and politician. He was a representative of the 16th, 17th, and 19th National Congress of the Chinese Communist Party. He was an alternate of the 16th Central Committee of the Chinese Communist Party. He was a member of the Standing Committee of the 17th and 18th Central Commission for Discipline Inspection. He is a member of the 19th Central Committee of the Chinese Communist Party. He is a member of the 13th National Committee of the Chinese People's Political Consultative Conference.

== Biography ==
Qiu was born in Shen County, Shandong, in August 1957. In July 1975, he became a secretary for the CCP Yushu Tibetan Autonomous Prefecture Committee. He joined the People's Procuratorate of Yushu Tibetan Autonomous Prefecture in November 1978 and rose to become its deputy chief procurator in June 1986. He joined the Chinese Communist Party (CCP) in December 1980. In October 1987, he was made deputy director of the Office of Combating Economic Crimes of the CCP Qinghai Provincial Committee, he remained in that position until January 1989, when he was assigned to the Qinghai Provincial People's Procuratorate. In July 1991, he became secretary-general of the Political and Legal Commission of CCP Qinghai Provincial Committee, but having held the position for only two years.

He was transferred to the Supreme People's Procuratorate in December 1993, where he was promoted to director of the Political Department in February 2000 and to deputy chief procurator in June 2001. In May 2020, he took office as vice chairperson of the Social and Legal Affairs Committee of the Chinese People's Political Consultative Conference.
