= Law Yearbook of China =

The Law Yearbook of China (Chinese: 中国法律年鉴; pinyin: Zhōngguō Fǎlǜ Niánjiàn) is a yearbook published by China Law Society, the official organization of the legal academic profession in the People's Republic of China.

Since it was first published in 1987, the Law Yearbook of China has been published for 19 volumes. It collected the information about the legislation, administrative regulations, judicial interpretation, and information about the development of the law of the People's Republic of China.

The content of the Yearbook is provided by the General Office of the Standing Committee of the National People's Congress, the Supreme People's Court, the Supreme People's Procuratorate, the Ministry of Public Security, the Ministry of Justice, the Legal Office of the State Council, and other departments of the national and local governments.
