= Wang Xiaoya =

Chinese television host

- 王小丫
- Born: January 22, 1968 (age 58); Zhaojue County, Sichuan, China
- Education: Sichuan University; Communication University of China
- Occupation: Host
- Years active: 1997–present
- Known for: Quiz Show
- Television: China Central Television (CCTV)
- Spouses: Lv Chenggong (m. 1996–2001) Cao Jianming (m. 2009)
- Awards: Golden Mike Award; 2003

Wang Xiaoya (Chinese: 王小丫; pinyin: Wāng Xiǎoyā; born 22 January 1968) /ʃaʊɪə/ is a Chinese television host and media personality.

She won the Golden Mike Award in 2003.

== Biography ==
Wang was born in Zhaojue County, Sichuan in January 1968. Her father was an editor in Liangshan Daily (凉山日报).

She entered Sichuan University in 1986, majoring in economics, where she graduated in 1990.

After graduation, she worked as a journalist in Sichuan Gaige Newspaper Office (四川改革报社) for six years. She resigned and studied at Communication University of China in 1996.

Wang joined the China Central Television in 1997, she hosted Golden Land (金土地) and Quiz Show (开心辞典).

== Awards ==
- 2003 Golden Mike Award

== Personal life ==
Wang was married to Chinese businessman Lu Chenggong (吕成功) in 1996, the couple divorced in 2001.

Wang remarried in July 2009 to Cao Jianming, a Chinese politician who is the former Procurator-General of the Supreme People's Procuratorate and the current Vice Chairperson of the National People's Congress.
