= CUPL Faculty of International Law =

The Faculty of International Law, CUPL (Chinese: 中国政法大学国际法学院) is a school of the China University of Political Science and Law. The school offers LL.B., LL.M. and Ph.D. degrees in Chinese and English. CUPL Faculty of International Law has over 49 faculty members and this makes it the largest faculty in Chinese universities that specializes in international law.
