= Wang Fang (politician) =

Chinese politician

- 王芳

Minister of Public Security
- In office 11 April 1987 – 28 December 1990
- Premier: Zhao Ziyang; Li Peng
- Preceded by: Ruan Chongwu
- Succeeded by: Tao Siju

Party Secretary of Zhejiang
- In office March 1983 – March 1987
- Preceded by: Tie Ying
- Succeeded by: Xue Ju

Personal details
- Born: 1920 Xintai, Shandong, China
- Died: 2009 (aged 88–89)
- Party: Chinese Communist Party

Wang Fang (Chinese: 王芳; pinyin: Wáng Fāng; 1920–2009) was a politician of the People's Republic of China, who most notably served as Communist Party Secretary of Zhejiang Province from March 1983 to April 1987, and then Minister of Public Security from April 1987 to November 1990.

== Biography ==
A native of Xintai, Shandong, Wang joined the Fourth Detachment of the Shandong People's Anti-Japanese Guerrillas of the Eighth Route Army in early 1938, during the Second Sino-Japanese War, and the Chinese Communist Party in April of the same year. In August 1942, he served as the head of the "enemy work area" (responsible for sabotage and assassinations behind the Japanese lines) of the Luzhong Military Region. In June 1945, he served as the director of the Political Department of the Independent Brigade of the Shandong Military Region.

During the Chinese Civil War, he was director of the Security Department of the Central Shandong Military Region. After March 1947, he successively served as head of the Organization Department and of the Security Department of the Eighth Column of the Third Field Army, and director of the Security Department of the Seventh Corps of the Third Field Army.

After the founding of the People's Republic of China, he successively served as the deputy director of the Public Security Department of the Hangzhou Military Control Commission, director of the Hangzhou Public Security Bureau, and deputy director of the Zhejiang Provincial Public Security Department. In November 1952, he served as director of the Zhejiang Provincial Public Security Department.

In September 1964, he became Deputy Governor of Zhejiang Province.

During the Cultural Revolution he was removed from all positions, arrested and labeled as a "capitalist roader", but after the fall of the Gang of Four he was one of the special prosecutors in the trial that convicted them.

After resuming work in 1977, he successively served as secretary of the Ningbo Municipal Committee of the Chinese Communist Party, director of the Ningbo Regional Revolutionary Committee, first secretary of the Ningbo Municipal Committee of the Chinese Communist Party, secretary of the Political and Legal Committee of the Zhejiang Provincial Party Committee, and Secretary-General of the Standing Committee of the Provincial CPPCC.

From March 1983 to April 1987 he was Communist Party Secretary of Zhejiang Province, and then served as Minister of Public Security from April 1987 to November 1990.

He played an active role in crushing the 1989 Tiananmen Square Protests, and, together with the Minister of State Security, Jia Chunwang, worked to dismantle and liquidate the foundations that George Soros had established in China.

Wang Fang was a full member of the 12th CPC Central Committee from 1982 to 1987, and then a member of the Central Advisory Commission from 1987 to 1992.

Military offices
| Preceded by Luo Qingtao | Political Commissar of the Zhejiang Military District; 1983–1986 | Succeeded by Ma Jiliang |
Party political offices
| Preceded by Tie Ying | Party Secretary of Zhejiang; 1983–1987 | Succeeded by Xue Ju |
Government offices
| Preceded by Ruan Chongwu | Minister of Public Security; April 1987 – November 1990 | Succeeded by Tao Siju |
