= Jiang Ping =

Chinese legal scholar (1930–2023)

- 江平
- Born: 28 December 1930; Dalian, Kwantung Leased Territory, Empire of Japan
- Died: 19 December 2023 (aged 92); Beijing, China
- Occupation: Jurist

Academic background
- Education: Yenching University; Moscow State University (graduated 1956)

Academic work
- Discipline: Jurisprudence
- Sub-discipline: Roman law, civil law, commercial law, corporate law
- Institutions: China University of Political Science and Law (1956–1990)

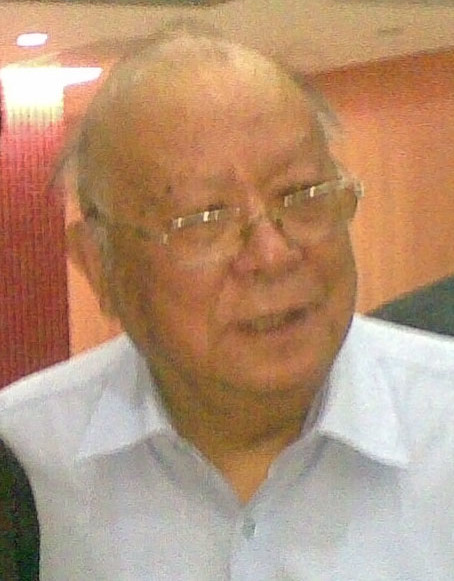

Jiang Ping (Chinese: 江平; pinyin: Jiāng Píng; 28 December 1930 – 19 December 2023) was a Chinese legal scholar. He was the President of China University of Political Science and Law, and a member of the Standing Committee of the National People's Congress.

== Biography ==
Jiang Ping was born in Ningbo, Zhejiang Province, on 28 December 1930. He was admitted to Yenching University in 1948 and in 1951, he went to Soviet Union to study law science and graduated from Moscow State University in 1956. After graduation, Jiang Ping joined the faculty of Beijing College of Political Science and Law.

Jiang became the President of China University of Political Science and Law in 1988. He resigned from the office in 1990 for his pro-student position in the 1989 Tiananmen Square protests and massacre. Jiang Ping was the Lifetime Professor of China University Of Political Science And Law, and his professional affiliations included the head of Beijing Arbitration Commission, the adviser, the arbitrator, the member of committee of experts of China International Economic and Trade Arbitration Commission. He had been to Belgium, Ghent University, the University of Hong Kong, University of Rome II in Italy, Japan's Aoyama Gakuin University, and Columbia University of the United States to give lectures. He was awarded an honorary Doctor of Laws from the University of Ghent, Belgium, Catholic University of Peru and served as Honorary Professor of Law. He also was awarded the outstanding middle-aged and young experts, the honorary title of outstanding teachers nationwide.

Jiang was a chief expert in making civil code ("General Principles of Civil law"), Administrative Litigation Law, Property Law, Trust Law and other fundamental laws in China during the legislation booming in the 1990s. After leaving the post as Vice-Chairman of the Law Committee of 7th National People's Congress in 1993, Jiang Ping resumed his professorship in China University of Political Science and Law. He is also regarded as the conscience of China's lawyers due to his consistent efforts in Rule of Law advocacy. Jiang Ping is an expert on civil law, especially Roman law.

Through his efforts, Re-education through labor, one of the administrative detention systems considered unreasonable in People's Republic of China, was abolished in 2013.

Jiang died at the China-Japan Friendship Hospital in Beijing, on 19 December 2023, at the age of 92.

== See also ==
- Law of the People's Republic of China

Academic offices
Preceded by Zou Yu	President of China University of Political Science and Law; 1988–1990	Succeeded by Chen Guangzhong
