= Chinese Journal of International Law =

- Discipline: International law
- Language: English
- Edited by: Wang Tieya; Sienho Yee

Publication details
- History: 2002–present
- Publisher: Oxford University Press in association with the Chinese Society of International Law and the Institute of International Law, Wuhan University
- Frequency: Quarterly
- Impact factor: 0.857 (2016)

Standard abbreviations
- ISO 4: Chin. J. Int. Law

Indexing
- ISSN: 1540-1650 (print); 1746-9937 (web)
- LCCN: 2002214223
- OCLC no.: 729879087

Links
- Journal homepage; Online access; Online archive

The Chinese Journal of International Law is a quarterly peer-reviewed law journal covering international law. Since 2005 it is published by Oxford University Press in association with the Chinese Society of International Law and the Institute of International Law (Wuhan University). The journal was established in 2002. The founding editors-in-chief are Wang Tieya and Sienho Yee. In 2005 Oxford University Press started to act as publisher. It is abstracted and indexed in the Social Sciences Citation Index since 2008. According to the Journal Citation Reports, the journal has a 2015 impact factor of 1.186; 2016 impact factor of 0.857.

The Chinese JIL has published papers on the core areas of public international law, including debates on jurisprudence of the International Court of Justice, the South China Sea arbitration, and identification of customary international law.

Each year the Chinese JIL publishes a long survey on the Chinese practice in public international law, and also, more recently, in private international law.
