= Cao Haibo =

Chinese politician

Cao Haibo (Chinese: 曹海波)

First Vice President of the University of Science and Technology of China
- In office 1961–1962

Personal details
- Born: 1915 Feixiang, Hebei, China
- Died: 12 July 2009 (aged 93–94)

Cao Haibo (Chinese: 曹海波; 1915 – 12 July 2009) was a Chinese political figure and educator. He served as Party Secretary and President of Beijing College of Political Science (now China University of Political Science and Law), First Vice President of the University of Science and Technology of China, and Vice President of the China Law Society. He later acted as an adviser to both the China Law Society and the Internal and Judicial Affairs Committee of the National People's Congress.

== Biography ==
Cao Haibo was born in 1915 in Feixiang, Hebei Province. He joined the Communist Youth League of China in 1930 and became a member of the Chinese Communist Party in 1933. From 1936 to June 1937, he served as Secretary of the CPC Feixiang Central County Committee and Secretary of the county's Communist Youth League Committee. In 1937, he studied in the thirteenth branch of the Central Party School and subsequently held several roles at the Northern Shaanxi Public School, including team leader, Party branch secretary, and political officer. He later served as a member of the Third Prefectural Committee of the CCP Jinan District and worked in both its publicity and organization departments. He also served as the Party branch secretary in the second division of the Central Party School.

After 1945, Cao held several political and administrative positions, including Standing Committee member and head of the Organization Department of the CCP Hanan Prefectural Committee, as well as Secretary of the Party Committee for directly affiliated organizations of the Harbin Special Municipal Committee. After the establishment of the People's Republic of China in 1949, he served as Party Secretary of the Transportation Department of the Central South Bureau and as Party Secretary and President of Wuhan Institute of Water Transport Engineering. In 1961, Cao became the Second Party Secretary and First Vice President of the University of Science and Technology of China. During the Cultural Revolution, he was persecuted.

Following his rehabilitation in 1979, Cao resumed prominent academic and political roles, serving as Party Secretary and President of Beijing College of Political Science (now China University of Political Science and Law), professor, Vice President and Party Leadership Group member of the China Law Society, and later as adviser to both the China Law Society and the Internal and Judicial Affairs Committee of the National People's Congress. Cao Haibo died on 12 July 2009.
