= Ren Jianxin =

Chinese jurist and politician (1925–2024)

- 任建新

Vice Chairman of the Chinese People's Political Consultative Conference
- In office 13 March 1998 – 13 March 2003
- Chairman: Li Ruihuan

President of the Supreme People's Court
- In office 9 April 1988 – 17 March 1998
- Preceded by: Zheng Tianxiang
- Succeeded by: Xiao Yang

Secretary of the Central Political and Legal Affairs Commission
- In office September 1992 – March 1998
- General Secretary: Jiang Zemin
- Preceded by: Qiao Shi
- Succeeded by: Luo Gan

Personal details
- Born: 5 August 1925 Xiangfen County, Shanxi, China
- Died: 21 September 2024 (aged 99) Beijing, China
- Party: Chinese Communist Party
- Spouse: Niu Lizhi (牛立志)

Ren Jianxin (Chinese: 任建新; pinyin: Rén Jiànxīn; 5 August 1925 – 21 September 2024) was a Chinese jurist and politician. He most notably served as president of the Supreme People's Court from 1988 to 1998, after having held the position of vice president since 1983, and as Secretary of the Central Political and Legal Affairs Commission of the Chinese Communist Party from 1992 to 1998, overseeing all police, intelligence, and judicial agencies.

== Biography ==
Ren Jianxin was born in Xiangfen County, Shanxi, in 1925. He studied chemical engineering at Peking University, graduating in 1948. During his studies, he was an underground communist activist, and officially joined the Chinese Communist Party (CCP) in June 1948. Then, he served as Secretary of the Secretary's Office of the North China People's Government, responsible for assisting Dong Biwu, Chairman of the North China People's Government. In 1949, he became the secretary of the General Office of the Central Political and Law Commission (Chinese: 中央政法委员会) and Secretary of the Legislative Affairs Commission of the Central People's Government (Chinese: 中央人民政府法制委员会).

He thus served, from 1949 to 1959, as an administrative employee in the Legislative Bureau of the Central People's Government, the Political and Legal Commission of the Central Committee of the Chinese Communist Party, the State Council Bureau of Legislative Affairs, as well as the State Council's General Office. In 1959, he served as Section Chief and then Director of the Department of Legal Affairs of the China Council for the Promotion of International Trade. When the Cultural Revolution broke out in 1966, Ren was persecuted, imprisoned, then sent down to work in the May 7 Cadre School.

Restored to his position in 1971, from that year to 1981 he was the Director of Legal Affairs in the China Council for the Promotion of International Trade (CCPIT), and, importantly, Secretary-General in its Maritime Arbitration Commission. This position became significant with the start of the reform and opening up, and Ren dealt with globally key maritime players, such as Greek ship-owners. In November 1973, Ren Jianxin headed a Chinese Government delegation, including Lu Long, Wang Zhengfa, and Yang Bo, to Geneva as an observer for the Fourth Series of Meetings of the Governing Bodies of the World Intellectual Property Organization (WIPO). On 3 March 1980, China presented its applications to WIPO, which became effective for China on 3 June 1980.

In 1983, Ren entered the Supreme People's Court of China as Executive Vice President for five years until 1988, and then President for the next 10 years from 1988 to 1998. It was during this time that he also advanced in the CCP, serving as a full member of the CCP's 13th and 14th Central Committees (1987–1997) and was chosen to become a member of the Secretariat of the Chinese Communist Party (1983–1992) and later also the Secretary of the Central Political and Legal Affairs Commission, from 1992 to 1998. In 1982, 1984, and 1990, the three pillars of China's intellectual property laws—the Trademark Law, the Patent Law, and the Copyright Law—were enacted as a result of Ren's coordination and initiative.

Finally, from 1998 to 2003 he was a Vice Chairman of the Chinese People's Political Consultative Conference.

Ren Jianxin died on 21 September 2024, at the age of 99.

== Honors and awards ==
- 1997–1999 President of the National Judges College
- 1997–2003 President of China Law Society

== See also ==
- Cao Jianming – Vice-president of the People's Supreme Court (1999–) Vice-president, People's Supreme Court
- Wan Exiang – Vice-president of the People's Supreme Court (Grade 2 Judge) (2000–) and vice-president of the People's Supreme Court

Legal offices
Preceded by Zheng Tianxiang	President of the Supreme People's Court; 1988–1998	Succeeded by Xiao Yang
Party political offices
Preceded by Qiao Shi	Secretary of Central Political and Legal Affairs Commission; 1992–1997	Succeeded by Luo Gan
Academic offices
Preceded by Zou Yu	President of China Law Society; 1997–2003	Succeeded by Han Zhubin
