= Liu Fuzhi =

Chinese politician (1917–2013)

- 刘复之

Procurator-General of the Supreme People's Procuratorate
- In office 9 April 1988 – 28 March 1993
- Preceded by: Yang Yichen
- Succeeded by: Zhang Siqing

Minister of Public Security
- In office 21 June 1983 – 6 September 1985
- Premier: Zhao Ziyang
- Preceded by: Zhao Cangbi
- Succeeded by: Ruan Chongwu

Minister of Justice
- In office 4 May 1982 – 20 June 1983
- Premier: Zhao Ziyang
- Preceded by: Wei Wenbo
- Succeeded by: Zou Yu

Personal details
- Born: March 1917 Mei County, Guangdong, China
- Died: 25 August 2013 (aged 96) Beijing, People's Republic of China
- Party: Chinese Communist Party
- Education: Moscow Automotive College

Liu Fuzhi
- Traditional Chinese: 劉復之
- Simplified Chinese: 刘复之
Transcriptions
Standard Mandarin
- Hanyu Pinyin: Liú Fùzhī
Yue: Cantonese
- Jyutping: Lau4 Fuk6 Ji1

Liu Fuzhi (March 1917 – 25 August 2013) was a politician of the People's Republic of China. He served as the Procurator-General of the Supreme People's Procuratorate, Minister of Public Security, and Minister of Justice.

== Biography ==
Liu was born in Mei County, Guangdong province in 1917.

In 1937, he entered the Yan'an North Shaanxi Public School and joined the Chinese Communist Party the following year. He served as Secretary-General of the Eighth Route Army Commander Zhu De, Director of the 129th Division of the Eighth Route Army, Secretary of the Political Commissar Deng Xiaoping, Chief of the Department of Political Affairs of the 129th Division of the Political Department of the 129th Division, Director of the Social Department of the Central Committee of the Shanxi-Hebei Central Committee, Director of the Social Affairs Department of the North China Bureau of the Central Committee of the Chinese Communist Party, and Central Military Commission Deputy Director of the General Office of the Ministry of Public Security.

After the founding of the People's Republic of China, he served as director of the General Office of the Ministry of Public Security and deputy director of the Ministry of Public Security. From January 1964 to December 1977, Liu was imprisoned due to the Cultural Revolution. He then served as Vice Minister of Culture, National People's Congress Deputy Director of the Legal Committee of the Standing Committee, Secretary General of the Political and Legal Committee of the CCP Central Committee, Minister of the Ministry of Justice, Minister of Public Security (April 1983–September 1985), First Political Commissar of the Chinese People's Armed Police Force, Deputy Secretary of the Political and Legal Committee of the CCP Central Committee, and Procurator-General of the Supreme People's Procuratorate (1988–1993). He was a member of the 12th and 13th Central Committee of the CCP, a representative of the 13th National Congress of the CCP, and a member of the Central Advisory Committee.

Liu died of an illness on 25 August 2013 at the age of 96. He is buried in Babaoshan Revolutionary Cemetery.

== Notes ==
Government offices
Preceded by Wei Wenbo	Minister of Justice; 1982–1983	Succeeded by Zou Yu
Preceded by Zhao Cangbi	Minister of Public Security; 1983–1985	Succeeded by Ruan Chongwu
Preceded by Yang Yichen	Procurator-General of the Supreme People's Procuratorate; 1988–1993	Succeeded by Zhang Siqing
Academic offices
Preceded by Cao Haibo	President of China University of Political Science and Law; 1983–1984	Succeeded by Zou Yu
