= Minister of Public Security (China) =

Office in the People's Republic of China

Minister of Public Security of the People's Republic of China
- 中华人民共和国公安部部长
- National Emblem of China

- Flag of China

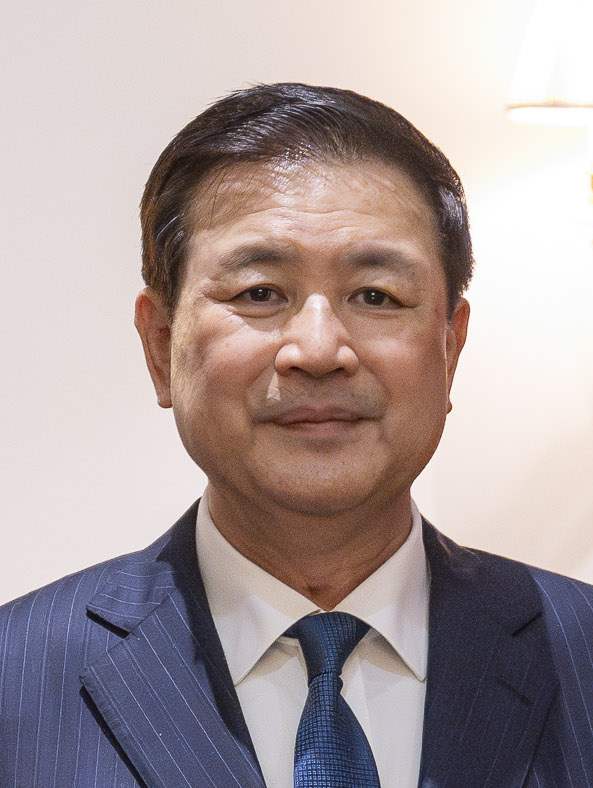
- Incumbent; Wang Xiaohong since 24 June 2022
- Ministry of Public Security of the People's Republic of China
- Status: Provincial and ministerial-level official
- Member of: Plenary Meeting of the State Council
- Seat: Ministry of Public Security Building, Xicheng District, Beijing
- Nominator: Premier (chosen within the Chinese Communist Party)
- Appointer: President with the confirmation of the National People's Congress or its Standing Committee
- Formation: 19 October 1949; 76 years ago
- First holder: Luo Ruiqing
- Deputy: Vice Minister of Public Security

The minister of public security is a member of the State Council of China and the head of the Ministry of Public Security (MPS). The position reports directly to the head of the Central Political and Legal Affairs Commission (CPLC) of the Chinese Communist Party. Within the State Council, the position is eight in order of precedence.

Officially, the minister is nominated by the premier of the State Council, who is then approved by the National People's Congress or its Standing Committee and appointed by the president. The minister is tasked with overseeing the public security police forces throughout the country. The minister concurrently serves as the director of the MPS Special Duty Bureau, responsible for protecting high-ranking political leaders. The ministers are each awarded the police rank of Commissioner General. The minister also usually serves as a state councillor and as the deputy secretary of the CPLC.

The minister is assisted by several vice ministers. Vice ministers generally serve as the director of the National Immigration Administration, director of the Beijing Municipal Public Security Bureau, director of the Legal System Bureau and director of the Political Security Protection Bureau.

== History ==
The Ministry of Public Security of the Central People's Government was established on 1 October 1949, and Luo Ruiqing became the first minister of public security on 19 October 1949. The ministry was renamed to the Ministry of Public Security of the PRC in September 1954; the office was also renamed. On 22 June 1970, the CCP Central Committee approved of the establishment of a Revolutionary Committee in the MPS, the director became the leader of the ministry. The ministerial system was restored in January 1975.

== List of ministers ==
No.	Portrait	Name (Birth–Death)	Term of office			Important offices held during tenure	Premier	Ref.
No.	Portrait	Name (Birth–Death)	Took office	Left office	Term	Important offices held during tenure	Premier	Ref.
Minister of Public Security of the Central People's Government
1		Luo Ruiqing 罗瑞卿 (1906–1978)	19 October 1949	28 September 1954	4 years, 344 days	Deputy Director of the Political and Legal Committee of the State Council; Commander of the People's Liberation Army Public Security Force; Political Commissar of the People's Liberation Army Public Security Force	Zhou Enlai	
Minister of Public Security of the People's Republic of China
1		Luo Ruiqing 罗瑞卿 (1906–1978)	28 September 1954	17 September 1959	4 years, 354 days	Deputy Director of the Political and Legal Committee of the State Council; Commander of the People's Liberation Army Public Security Force; Political Commissar of the People's Liberation Army Public Security Force Vice Premier of the State Council	Zhou Enlai	
2		Xie Fuzhi 谢富治 (1909–1972)	17 September 1959	22 June 1970	10 years, 278 days	Commander of the People's Liberation Army Public Security Force; Political Commissar of the People's Liberation Army Public Security Force; Vice Premier of the State Council; Secretary of the CCP Secretariat; Director of the Beijing Revolutionary Committee; Political Commissar of the Beijing Military Region; Political Commissar of the PLA Beijing Garrison	Zhou Enlai	
Director of the Revolutionary Committee of the Ministry of Public Security
3		Li Zhen 李震 (1914–1973)	22 June 1970	21 October 1973	3 years, 121 days	Head of the Party Core Group of the Ministry of Public Security	Zhou Enlai	
Vacant; 21 October 1973 – 17 January 1975
Minister of Public Security of the People's Republic of China
4		Hua Guofeng 华国锋 (1921–2008)	17 March 1975	5 March 1978	2 years, 353 days	Premier of the State Council; Chairman of the Central Military Commission	Zhou Enlai ↓ Hua Guofeng	
5		Zhao Cangbi 赵苍璧 (1916–1993)	5 March 1978	21 June 1983	5 years, 108 days	Secretary of the Party Leadership Group of the Ministry of Public Security; Member of the Central Political and Legal Affairs Commission; Political Commissar of the People's Armed Police	Hua Guofeng ↓ Zhao Ziyang	
6		Liu Fuzhi 刘复之 (1917–2013)	21 June 1983	6 September 1985	2 years, 77 days	Secretary of the Party Leadership Group of the Ministry of Public Security; Political Commissar of the People's Armed Police; Deputy Secretary of the Central Political and Legal Affairs Commission	Zhao Ziyang	
7		Ruan Chongwu 阮崇武 (born 1933)	6 September 1985	11 April 1987	1 year, 217 days	Secretary of the Party Leadership Group of the Ministry of Public Security; Political Commissar of the People's Armed Police	Zhao Ziyang	
8		Wang Fang 王芳 (1920–2009)	11 April 1987	28 December 1990	3 years, 261 days	Secretary of the Party Leadership Group of the Ministry of Public Security; Political Commissar of the People's Armed Police; State Councillor; Director of the National Narcotics Control Commission	Zhao Ziyang ↓ Li Peng	
9		Tao Siju 陶驷驹 (1935–2016)	28 December 1990	19 March 1998	7 years, 81 days	Secretary of the Party Leadership Group of the Ministry of Public Security; Political Commissar of the People's Armed Police	Li Peng	
10		Jia Chunwang 贾春旺 (born 1938)	19 March 1998	28 December 2002	4 years, 284 days	Secretary of the Party Leadership Group of the Ministry of Public Security; Political Commissar of the People's Armed Police	Zhu Rongji	
11		Zhou Yongkang 周永康 (born 1942)	28 December 2002	28 October 2007	4 years, 304 days	Secretary of the Party Leadership Group of the Ministry of Public Security; Political Commissar of the People's Armed Police; State Councillor; Secretary of the CCP Secretariat; Deputy Secretary of the Central Political and Legal Affairs Commission	Zhu Rongji ↓ Wen Jiabao	
12		Meng Jianzhu 孟建柱 (born 1947)	28 October 2007	28 December 2012	5 years, 61 days	Secretary of the Party Leadership Group of the Ministry of Public Security; Political Commissar of the People's Armed Police; State Councillor; Secretary of the Central Political and Legal Affairs Commission	Wen Jiabao	
13		Guo Shengkun 郭声琨 (born 1954)	28 December 2012	4 November 2017	4 years, 311 days	Secretary of the Party Leadership Group of the Ministry of Public Security; Political Commissar of the People's Armed Police; State Councillor; Secretary of the CCP Secretariat; Deputy Secretary of the Central Political and Legal Affairs Commission	Wen Jiabao ↓ Li Keqiang	
14		Zhao Kezhi 赵克志 (born 1953)	4 November 2017	24 June 2022	5 years, 219 days	Secretary of the Party Leadership Group of the Ministry of Public Security; State Councillor; Deputy Secretary of the Central Political and Legal Affairs Commission	Li Keqiang	
15		Wang Xiaohong 王小洪 (born 1957)	24 June 2022	Incumbent	4 years, 76 days	Secretary of the Party Leadership Group of the Ministry of Public Security; Political Commissar of the People's Armed Police; State Councillor; Deputy Secretary of the Central Political and Legal Affairs Commission	Li Keqiang ↓ Li Qiang	
