= Campaign to the North of Baoding =

1947 military campaign

- Part of Chinese Civil War
| Date | June 25, 1947 – July 6, 1947 |
| Location | Hebei, China |
| Result | Communist victory |

Belligerents
| Flag of the National Revolutionary Army National Revolutionary Army | PLA People's Liberation Army |

Commanders and leaders
| unknown | Yang Dezhi; Luo Ruiqing |

Strength
| 70,000 | 60,000 |

Casualties and losses
| 8,200 | 3,000 |

Campaign to the North of Baoding consisted of several battles fought between the Nationalists and the Communists in the region north of Baoding during the Chinese Civil War in the post-World War II era and resulted in a Communist victory.

== Prelude ==
By the mid of June 1947 the Nationalists had given up any attempt to reinforce Northeast China by sending the 43rd Division of the 94th Army. Instead, the 43rd Division was deployed to the south of Tianjin along with other Nationalist units, including the 16th Army, the Reorganized 62nd Division and the 142nd Division of the 92nd Army. In the region north of Baoding, the Nationalists had six divisions and two regiments, including the Independent 95th Brigade, the 2nd Security Division and the 3rd Security Division stationed at Baoding. For the region along the railway from Gaobei Hotel (Gao Bei Dian, 高碑店) to Xushui (徐水) and the regions of Yi (易) county and Laishui (涞水), the garrisons were from the 5th Division and 121st Division of the 94th Army, the 7th Security Division and a regiment of the 109th Division of the 16th Army. The Communists decided to launch an offensive against the Nationalists in the region north of Baoding in accordance with the Communist Summer Offensive of 1947 in Northeast China.

== Order of battle ==
Nationalist order of battle:

- The 16th Army stationed at Baoding
- The 94th Army
  - The 5th Division
  - The 43rd Division
  - The 121st Division
- The Independent 95th Brigade
- The 2nd Security Division
- The 3rd Security Division
- The 7th Security Division
- Local Security Regiments

Communist order of battle:

- The 2nd Column
- The 3rd Column
- The 4th Column

== Campaign ==
On June 25 the Communist 2nd Column attacked the town of Xushui (徐水), and the bulk of the Communist force of the 3rd Column attacked the town of Solid City (Gu Cheng, 固城) and Northern River Hotel (Bei He Dian, 北河店), while the majority of the Communist 4th Column attacked the region of the Source of the Cao River (Cao He Tou, 漕河头) and the region of Xu River Bridge (Xu He Qiao, 徐河桥). Meanwhile, detachments from the Communist 3rd and 4th Columns were deployed to stop any Nationalist reinforcements. By the evening of June 26 the Communist 2nd Column succeeded in taking Xushui (徐水) and completely annihilated the local garrison consisted of a regiment of the 109th Division of the 16th Army. In addition, Nationalist strongholds along the railway from Xushui (徐水) to Tian's Village Shop (Tian Cun Pu, 田村铺) had fallen into enemy hands. On June 27 the Communist 4th Column succeeded in taking regions that included Twenty-Mile Shop (Er Shi Li Pu, 二十里铺), Source of the Cao River (Cao He Tou, 漕河头), Xu River Bridge (Xu He Qiao, 徐河桥) and Sun's Village (Sun Zhuang, 孙庄), badly mauling the local garrison that consisted of the 2nd and 3rd Security Divisions in the process. The Communist success forced the Nationalists to send out reinforcements: the 16th Army and the 43rd Division of the 94th Army reached an area south of Liang Township (Liang Xiang, 良乡) via the Beijing–Hankou railroad, and the 5th Division and the 121st Division of the 94th Army reached the region of Northern River Hotel (Bei He Dian, 北河店), from Dingxing (定兴). Little did the Nationalists know that the enemy was waiting to ambush them.

On June 28 a portion of the 6th Brigade of the Communist 2nd Column and the 7th and 8th Brigades of the 3rd Column stopped the Nationalist reinforcements at Shiwuji (十五汲), the region south of Northern River Hotel (Bei He Dian, 北河店), while the bulk of the 6th Brigade of the communist 2nd Column attempted to outflank the reinforcements from behind. After being ambushed from the flank, the Nationalists immediately withdrew to the north of Northern River Hotel (Bei He Dian, 北河店), thus successfully avoiding besiegement, but in doing so their attempts to reinforce were doomed. As a result, by the evening of June 28 the Communist 3rd Column took Solid City (Gu Cheng, 固城); the local garrison of the town, consisting of a regiment of the 121st Division of the 94th Army, was completely annihilated. In addition, in a stretch from the region of Tian's Village Shop (Tian Cun Pu, 田村铺) to the region of Northern River Hotel (Bei He Dian, 北河店), all Nationalist strongholds along the railway had fallen into enemy hands. In order to lure out the Nationalists in Baoding for an ambush, from July 4–6 the Communist 4th Column took regions including Horse Factory (Ma Chang, 马厂), Xie's Village (Xie Zhuang, 谢庄), Northern and Southern Strange Villages (Nan – Bei Qi Cun, 南北奇村) west of Baoding, and wiped out the 1,000 Nationalist reinforcements, consisting of security regiments from Full City (Man Cheng, 满城) and Completed County (Wan Xian, 完县). The Nationalists in Baoding refused to be lured out and the campaign thus concluded with a Communist victory.

== Outcome ==
The defeated Nationalists suffered more than 8,200 casualties and the critical communication / transportation line of the Beijing–Hankou railroad was cut by the enemy as a result.

== See also ==
- Outline of the Chinese Civil War
- National Revolutionary Army
- History of the People's Liberation Army
- Chinese Civil War
