= Standing Committee of the 15th Central Commission for Discipline Inspection =

The 15th Standing Committee of the Central Commission for Discipline Inspection (CCDI) was elected at the 1st Plenary Session of the 15th CCDI and then endorsed by the 1st Plenary Session of the 15th Central Committee on 18 September 1997.

== Members ==
Name (birth–death)	Took office	Left office	Duration
Mao Wen (born ?)	18 September 1997	15 November 2002	5 years, 58 days
Liu Liying (born 1939)	18 September 1997	15 November 2002	5 years, 58 days
Qi Peiwen (born ?)	18 September 1997	15 November 2002	5 years, 58 days
Li Zhilun (1942–2007)	18 September 1997	15 November 2002	5 years, 58 days
Li Dengzhu (born ?)	18 September 1997	15 November 2002	5 years, 58 days
He Yong (born 1940)	18 September 1997	15 November 2002	5 years, 58 days
Zhou Ziyu (born 1935)	18 September 1997	15 November 2002	5 years, 58 days
Zhao Hongzhu (born 1947)	18 September 1997	15 November 2002	5 years, 58 days
Yuan Chunqing (born 1952)	18 September 1997	15 November 2002	5 years, 58 days
Xia Zanzhong (born 1939)	18 September 1997	15 November 2002	5 years, 58 days
Cao Qingze (born ?)	18 September 1997	15 November 2002	5 years, 58 days
Wei Jianxing (1931–2015)	18 September 1997	15 November 2002	5 years, 58 days
Peng Gang (born ?)	18 September 1997	15 November 2002	5 years, 58 days
Han Zhubin (born 1932)	18 September 1997	15 November 2002	5 years, 58 days
Fu Jie (born ?)	18 September 1997	15 November 2002	5 years, 58 days
