= Tao Siju =

Chinese politician

- 陶驷驹

Minister of Public Security
- In office 28 December 1990 – 19 March 1998
- Premier: Li Peng
- Preceded by: Wang Fang
- Succeeded by: Jia Chunwang

Personal details
- Born: April 1935 Jingjiang, Jiangsu, China
- Died: April 18, 2016 (aged 80–81) Beijing, China
- Party: Chinese Communist Party
- Education: China Foreign Affairs University

Tao Siju (simplified Chinese: 陶驷驹; traditional Chinese: 陶駟駒; pinyin: Táo Sìjū; April 1935 – April 18, 2016) was the Minister of Public Security of the People's Republic of China between 1990 and 1998.

== Biography ==
Tao was born in Jingjiang, Jiangsu. In 1950 he was admitted to the Shanghai Textiles College (later merged into Donghua University). A year later he was admitted to the People's Public Security University of China, and began pursuing a career in policing. Tao received his associate degree in English from China Foreign Affairs University in 1959. He worked at the Ministry of Public Security until 1968, when he was purged during the Cultural Revolution. He was sent down to a May Seventh Cadre School.

In October 1975, Tao returned to work, first at the Chinese Academy of Sciences, then as secretary to General Luo Ruiqing. In July 1983 Tao was named Vice-Minister of Public Security. Tao was the Minister of Public Security from 1990 to 1998. During his tenure he was known for pioneering the "110" hotline for reporting crimes to the police in large cities. He also streamlined the police ranking system. He left active politics in 1998 and began sitting on the National People's Congress Internal and Judicial Affairs Committee. He retired in June 2009.

Tao was the member of the 14th and 15th Central Committee of the Chinese Communist Party from 1992 to 2002.

Tao died on April 18, 2016. Xi Jinping, Li Keqiang, Hu Jintao, and Zhu Rongji sent their condolences. His funeral was attended by Meng Jianzhu and Guo Shengkun.

== Quote ==
- "The members of triads are not always gangsters. As long as they are patriots, concerned with maintaining the prosperity of Hong Kong, we should respect them."

Government offices
Preceded by Wang Fang	Minister of Public Security; 1990–1998	Succeeded by Jia Chunwang
