= Zhao Cangbi =

Chinese politician

- 赵苍璧

Minister of Public Security
- In office 5 March 1978 – 21 June 1983
- Premier: Hua Guofeng; Zhao Ziyang
- Preceded by: Hua Guofeng
- Succeeded by: Liu Fuzhi

Political Commissar of the People's Armed Police
- In office January 1983 – July 1983
- Preceded by: Office established
- Succeeded by: Liu Fuzhi

Personal details
- Born: March 12, 1916 Qingjian County, Shaanxi, Republic of China
- Died: May 11, 1993 (aged 77) Beijing, China
- Party: Chinese Communist Party
- Spouse: Hui Yuxiu

Zhao Cangbi (Chinese: 赵苍壁; Pinyin: Zhào Cāngbì; 1916–1993) was a Chinese official, Minister of Public Security from 1978 to 1983.

== Biography ==
Zhao was born in Qingjian County, Shaanxi in 1916. He joined the Chinese Communist Party in 1935. From 1935 to 1937, he studied in the Northwest Security Bureau Training Class and served as an inspector of the Northwest Security Bureau. From 1937 to 1939, he served as the director of the inspection team of the Security Department of the Shaanxi-Gansu-Ningxia Border Region, the head of the third section of the Security Department, the deputy commander of the Security Command of the Trilateral Division of the Shaanxi-Gansu-Ningxia Border Region, the Special Commissioner of the North Red Army, and the Special Commissioner of the Jingheng Command.

From 1939 to 1940, he served as the head of the training class of the Security Department of the Shaanxi-Gansu-Ningxia Border Region and studied in the training class of the Central Social Affairs Department (SAD). From 1940 to 1942, he served as the captain of the plainclothes team of the Security Department of the Shaanxi-Gansu-Ningxia Border Region. From 1942 to 1945, he served as the director of the Security Department of Longdong Prefecture. Since 1945, he has served as deputy director of the Security Department of the Shaanxi-Gansu-Ningxia Border Region. From 1948 to 1949, he served as Director of the Social Department of the Central Committee of the Chinese Communist Party and Director of the Third Division of the Public Security Bureau of Beijing.

From 1949 to 1954, he served as deputy director of the Nanjing Public Security Bureau, deputy director of the Public Security Department of the Southwest Military and Political Commission and dean of the Southwest Public Security College, and deputy director of the Public Security Bureau of the Southwest Administrative Commission. From April 1955 to September 1959, he served as Director of the Sichuan Provincial Public Security Department. Since April 1955, he has served as Director of the Political and Legal Office of the Sichuan Provincial People's Committee. From February 1956, he served as a member of the Standing Committee of the Sichuan Provincial Committee of the Chinese Communist Party.

From September 1959 to January 1967, he served as the Secretary of the Secretariat of the Sichuan Provincial Committee of the Chinese Communist Party; from November 1956 to January 1967, he served as the Deputy Governor of Sichuan Province. During this period: from March 1959 to November 1962, concurrently served as the dean of the Sichuan Provincial Institute of Political Science, Law and Public Security; from September 1959 to January 1967, concurrently served as the secretary of the Sichuan Provincial Committee Ethnic Minorities Work Committee of the Chinese Communist Party; from August 1962 to June 1964, concurrently served as Sichuan Dean of the School of Administration.

During the Cultural Revolution, Zhao was imprisoned.

From 1972 to 1974, he served as the group leader and deputy director of the Political Department of the Sichuan Provincial Revolutionary Committee.

From December 1974 to March 1977, he served as the deputy secretary of the Sichuan Provincial Party Committee of the Chinese Communist Party.

From March 1977 to April 1983, he served as Minister of Public Security. From January 1980 to July 1983, he also was a member of the Political and Legal Committee of the Central Committee of the Chinese Communist Party. From January to July 1983, he concurrently served as political commissar of the Chinese People's Armed Police Force.

Full member of the 11th CPC Central Committee from 1977 to 1982 and the 12th CPC Central Committee from 1982 to 1987 and of the Central Advisory Commission from 1987 to 1992.

He died in Beijing on May 11, 1993, at the age of 77. After his death, he was officially eulogized as "an excellent member of the Communist Party of China, a long-tested loyal communist fighter, one of the outstanding leaders of the public security front of the party".

Government offices
Preceded by Hua Guofeng	Minister of Public Security; 1977–1983	Succeeded by Liu Fuzhi
