= Li Senmao =

Chinese politician

Li Senmao (Chinese: 李森茂; pinyin: Lǐ Sēnmào) (1929 – June 18, 1996) was a politician of the People's Republic of China, and a Minister of Railways of China.

Government offices
Preceded by Ding Guangen	Minister of Railways of the People's Republic of China; 1988–1992	Succeeded by Han Zhubin
