= Wang Zhongfang =

Chinese politician

Wang Zhongfang (January 1921 – January 14, 2017, Chinese: 王仲方) was a politician in the People's Republic of China from Wuhu, Anhui Province. He served as president of the China Law Society and deputy director of the Legislative Affairs Committee of the National Committee of the Chinese People's Political Consultative Conference (CPPCC).

== Biography ==
In 1936, Wang Zhongfang attended the Zhejiang Provincial People's Experimental School, where he engaged in the progressive student movement and founded the "Jingshan Common Learning Society," serving as its president. In December 1937, he was presented by the Wuhan Office of the Eighth Route Army and subsequently enrolled in the 10th squad of the 3rd phase of the Counter-Japanese Military and Political University in Yan'an, where he became a member of the Chinese Communist Party in February 1938. In March 1938, Wang Zhongfang enrolled in the Central Stenographic Training Class (Chinese: 中央速记训练班). In August, he assumed the role of stenographer for the Central Publicity Department and was among the inaugural group of stenographers educated by the stenographic class. In November, he assumed the role of chief instructor for the Anwu Youth Training Class and was appointed captain of the class. In May 1940, he assumed the position of chief of the teaching section at the Zedong School of Youth Cadres. In September 1941, he assumed the role of chief of the education section and class master at the Yanan College of Nationalities (Chinese: 延安民族学院). In May 1943, he assumed the position of chief of the cadres at the Counter-Japanese Military and Political University.

Following the Second Sino-Japanese War, Wang Zhongfang held the position of political instructor at the Jinji Luyu Military and Political University. From July 1947, he was appointed as the head of the secretarial section and the material section of the Social Department of the Central Bureau of the Jinji Luyu Central Committee. In June 1948, he became the political secretary of the Social Department of the North China Bureau, as well as the deputy head and subsequently the head of the research section. In August 1949, he held the position of deputy head of the Secretariat of the Preparatory Committee for the New CPPCC. He contributed to the organization of the New Chinese People's Political Consultative Conference and the significant arrangements for the Proclamation of the People's Republic of China.

From October 1949 to December 1950, Wang held the position of deputy director of the Research Office and director of the Secretariat of the General Office of the Ministry of Public Security. Beginning in 1951, he served as the political secretary to Luo Ruiqing. In May 1953, he was appointed deputy director of the General Office of the Ministry of Public Security. In May 1961, he transitioned to the Provincial Party Committee of Qinghai Province, where he successively assumed the roles of Deputy Secretary General, secretary general, and head of the Leading Group of Provincial Political and Legal Affairs. In July 1964, he was appointed Deputy Secretary General of the Qinghai Provincial Party Committee. In July 1964, he joined the Standing Committee of the CCP Qinghai Provincial Committee.

In September 1975, Wang Zhongfang was appointed as a member of the party group, deputy secretary-general of the Chinese Academy of Social Sciences, and director of the Institute of Law inside CASS. In February 1979, he assumed the role of director of the General Office of the Publicity Department of the Chinese Communist Party. In March 1981, he assumed the position of deputy director of the Commission for Cultural Contact with Foreign Countries of the People's Republic of China. In December 1982, he assumed the role of executive vice-president of the China Law Society.

In August 1985, he assumed the presidency of the China Law Society; in October 1987, he was elected as a delegate to the 13th National Congress of the Chinese Communist Party; in April 1988 and February 1993, he was elected as a member of the Seventh and Eighth National Committees of the Chinese People's Political Consultative Conference, serving as deputy director of the Legislative Affairs Committee of the CPPCC and as an advisory member of the Ministry of Public Security; in January 2000, he resigned from his position to recuperate.

Wang Zhongfang died in Beijing on January 14, 2017, at the age of 96.
