= Zhang Siqing =

Chinese politician (1932–2022)

- 张思卿

Vice Chairman of the Chinese People's Political Consultative Conference
- In office 13 March 1998 – 13 March 2008
- Chairperson: Li Ruihuan; Jia Qinglin

Procurator-General of the Supreme People's Procuratorate
- In office 28 March 1993 – 17 March 1998
- Preceded by: Liu Fuzhi
- Succeeded by: Han Zhubin

Personal details
- Born: August 1932 Luoyang County, Hunan, China
- Died: 17 June 2022 (aged 89) Beijing, China
- Party: Chinese Communist Party

Chinese name
- Simplified Chinese: 张思卿
- Traditional Chinese: 張思卿
Transcriptions
Standard Mandarin
- Hanyu Pinyin: Zhāng Sīqīng

Zhang Siqing (Chinese: 张思卿; pinyin: Zhāng Sīqīng; August 1932 – 17 June 2022) was a Chinese politician and magistrate.

== Biography ==
Zhang was born in Luoyang, Henan, China, in 1932. He joined the Chinese Communist Party (CCP) in 1952.

He was the President of Hubei High People's Court and Head of Hubei Public Security Bureau, and the Secretary of the Zhengfa Committee of the CCP Hubei Committee from 1983 to 1985.

Zhang entered the Supreme People's Procuratorate in 1985 and became an associate procurator. He was elected by the National People's Congress as the procurator-general of the Supreme People's Procuratorate from 1993 to 1998.

He died from an illness in Beijing on 17 June 2022, at the age of 89.

Legal offices
Preceded by Gu Wancai (顾万才)	President of Hubei Higher People's Court; 1983–1984	Succeeded by Ma Liang (马良)
Preceded by Liu Fuzhi	Procurator-General of the Supreme People's Procuratorate; 1993–1998	Succeeded by Han Zhubin
