= Cao Jianming =

Chinese politician (born 1955)

- 曹建明
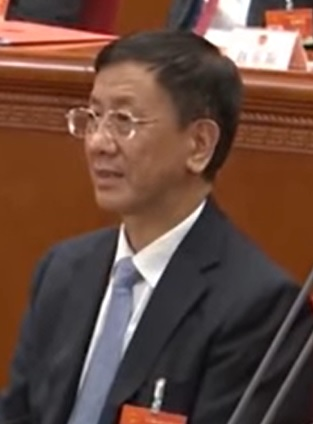

Vice Chairman of the Standing Committee of the National People's Congress
- In office 17 March 2018 – 10 March 2023
- Chairman: Li Zhanshu

Procurator-General of the Supreme People's Procuratorate
- In office 16 March 2008 – 18 March 2018
- Preceded by: Jia Chunwang
- Succeeded by: Zhang Jun

Vice President of the Supreme People's Court
- In office 16 March 2003 – 16 March 2008
- President: Xiao Yang

Personal details
- Born: September 24, 1955 (age 70) Shanghai
- Party: Chinese Communist Party
- Spouse: Wang Xiaoya
- Education: East China University of Political Science and Law

Cao Jianming (Chinese: 曹建明; pinyin: Cáo Jiànmíng; born September 24, 1955, in Shanghai) is a Chinese retired politician who served as a vice chairman of the Standing Committee of the National People's Congress from 2018 to 2023. Previously, he was the procurator-general of the Supreme People's Procuratorate.

== Biography ==
He received his LL.B and LL.M degrees from East China University of Political Science and Law in 1983 and 1986.

After graduation, Cao joined the faculty of the same university. He was the President of this university from 1997 to 1999 and became the President of the National Judges College in 1999.

He studied in Ghent University in Ghent, Belgium, in Europe from 1989 to 1990.

Cao was appointed Vice President of the Supreme People's Court in 1999.

On March 16, 2008, Cao was elected procurator-general of the Supreme People's Procuratorate. He was elected as the Vice Chairperson of the Standing Committee of the National People's Congress in March 2018.

Cao was a member of the 17th, 18th, and 19th Central Committees of the Chinese Communist Party. He was an alternate of the 16th Central Committee.

On 7 December 2020, pursuant to Executive Order 13936, the United States Department of the Treasury imposed sanctions on the entire 14 Vice Chairpersons of the National People's Congress, including Cao, for "undermining Hong Kong's autonomy and restricting the freedom of expression or assembly."

Legal offices
Preceded by Jia Chunwang	Procurator-General of the Supreme People's Procuratorate; 2008 – 2018	Succeeded by Zhang Jun
Educational offices
Preceded by Shi Huanzhang	President of East China University of Political Science and Law; 1997 – 1999	Succeeded by He Qinhua
