= Procurator-General of the Supreme People's Procuratorate =

Chinese government position

Procurator-General of the Supreme People's Procuratorate of the People's Republic of China
- 中华人民共和国 最高人民检察院检察长
- Emblem of the Supreme People's Procuratorate

- Incumbent; Ying Yong since 11 March 2023
- Supreme People's Court
- Status: Deputy national-level official
- Member of: Supreme People's Court
- Reports to: National People's Congress and its Standing Committee
- Seat: Beijing
- Nominator: Presidium of the National People's Congress
- Appointer: National People's Congress
- Term length: Five years, renewable once consecutively
- Constituting instrument: Constitution of China
- Formation: 1 October 1949; 77 years ago
- First holder: Luo Ronghuan
- Deputy: Deputy Procurator-General

Procurator-General of the Supreme People's Procuratorate
- Simplified Chinese: 中华人民共和国最高人民检察院检察长
- Traditional Chinese: 中華人民共和國最高人民檢察院檢察長
Transcriptions
Standard Mandarin
- Hanyu Pinyin: Zhōnghuá Rénmín Gònghéguó Zuìgāo Rénmín Jiǎncháyuàn Jiǎncházhǎng

Alternative Chinese name
- Simplified Chinese: 最高人民检察院检察长
- Traditional Chinese: 最高人民檢察院檢察長
Transcriptions
Standard Mandarin
- Hanyu Pinyin: Zuìgāo Rénmín Jiǎncháyuàn Jiǎncházhǎng

The procurator-general of the Supreme People's Procuratorate is the head of the Supreme People's Procuratorate and is the highest-ranking prosecutor in China. The procurator-general leads the SPP and oversees its work. Under the current constitution, the procurator-general is appointed by and serves at the pleasure of the National People's Congress (NPC), the legislature. The incumbent procurator-general is Ying Yong, who took office on 11 March 2023.

== History ==
The Supreme People's Procuratorate of the Central People's Government was established on 1 October 1949. Luo Ronghuan served as the first procurator-general by the first plenary session of the Chinese People's Political Consultative Conference.

On 27 September 1954, the SPP of the Central People's Government was replaced with the SPP of the People's Republic of China.

== Selection ==
According to the Organic Law of the National People's Congress (NPC), constitutionally China's supreme organ of state power, the prosecutor general is nominated by the NPC Presidium, the Congress's executive organ. However, the nomination is effectively made by the Chinese Communist Party, with the decisions being made among Party leaders. Candidates for top positions including the procurator-general are first approved first by the CCP's Politburo Standing Committee, and then by its Politburo, then approved in a special plenary session the Central Committee just before the NPC session for election by the Congress, with the Presidium presenting the nominee during the NPC session. Although the Presidium could theoretically nominate multiple candidates for the presidency, leading the election to be competitive, it has always nominated a single candidate for the office.

After the nomination, the prosecutor general is elected by the NPC, which also has the power to remove him and other state officers from their office. Elections and removals are decided by majority vote only in a NPC plenary session. The length of the prosecutor general's term of office is the same as the NPC, which is 5 years, and the prosecutor general is restricted to two consecutive terms of office. Since 2018, the new or returning prosecutor general is required to recite the constitutional oath of office before assuming office.

== List of procurators-general ==
No.	Chairperson	NPC term	Took office	Left office	Political Party
1	Luo Ronghuan 罗荣桓	N/A	October 1, 1949	September 27, 1954	Chinese Communist Party (CCP)
2	Zhang Dingcheng 张鼎丞	1st	September 27, 1954	April 27, 1959	Chinese Communist Party (CCP)
2	Zhang Dingcheng 张鼎丞	2nd	April 27, 1959	January 3, 1965	Chinese Communist Party (CCP)
2	Zhang Dingcheng 张鼎丞	3rd	January 3, 1965	January 17, 1975	Chinese Communist Party (CCP)
From 17 January 1975 to 5 March 1978, the post of Procurator-general of the Supreme People's Procuratorate was abolished.
3	Huang Huoqing 黄火青	5th	March 5, 1978	June 20, 1983	Chinese Communist Party (CCP)
4	Yang Yichen 杨易辰	6th	June 20, 1983	April 9, 1988	Chinese Communist Party (CCP)
5	Liu Fuzhi 刘复之	7th	April 9, 1988	March 28, 1993	Chinese Communist Party (CCP)
6	Zhang Siqing 张思卿	8th	March 28, 1993	March 17, 1998	Chinese Communist Party (CCP)
7	Han Zhubin 韩杼滨	9th	March 17, 1998	March 16, 2003	Chinese Communist Party (CCP)
8	Jia Chunwang 贾春旺	10th	March 16, 2003	March 16, 2008	Chinese Communist Party (CCP)
9	Cao Jianming 曹建明	11th	March 16, 2008	March 15, 2013	Chinese Communist Party (CCP)
9	Cao Jianming 曹建明	12th	March 15, 2013	March 18, 2018	Chinese Communist Party (CCP)
10	Zhang Jun 张军	13th	March 18, 2018	March 11, 2023	Chinese Communist Party (CCP)
11	Ying Yong 应勇	14th	March 11, 2023	Incumbent	Chinese Communist Party (CCP)
