= Chinese Society of International Law =

Chinese Society of International Law (Chinese: 中国国际法学会) founded by in 1980 and has more than 800 registered members from all over the country engaged in teaching and research institutions of international law, state organs and other practical work departments. Chinese Society of International Law in China is the center of international academic exchange. Conducts promotion of international law in China, research, practice, dissemination and development, play an important role and impact.

== Journal ==
The Chinese Journal of International Law is an independent, peer-reviewed journal published in association with The Chinese Society of International Law, Beijing, and Wuhan University Institute of International Law, Wuhan, China by Oxford University Press.

== Other publications ==
CSIL also publishes in Chinese the Chinese Yearbook of International Law and The Chinese Society of International Law Newsletter.

== See also ==
- China Law Society
