= Zheng Tianxiang =

Chinese politician

- 郑天翔

President of the Supreme People's Court
- In office 20 June 1983 – 9 April 1988
- Preceded by: Jiang Hua
- Succeeded by: Ren Jianxin

Minister of Aerospace Industry
- In office 1978–1982
- Premier: Hua Guofeng; Zhao Ziyang
- Preceded by: Song Renqiong
- Succeeded by: Zhang Jun

Personal details
- Born: September 9, 1914 Inner Mongolia
- Died: October 10, 2013 (aged 99)
- Party: Chinese Communist Party

Zheng Tianxiang (simplified Chinese: 郑天翔; traditional Chinese: 鄭天翔; pinyin: Zhèng Tiānxiáng; September 9, 1914 – October 10, 2013) was a Chinese politician and was the president of the Supreme People's Court.

== Biography ==
Zheng was born in Inner Mongolia. He was educated at Tsinghua University from 1935 to 1937. He was a member of the Central Advisory Commission from 1982 to 1992 and was the president of the Supreme People's Court from 1983 to 1988.

Legal offices
Preceded by Jiang Hua	President of the Supreme People's Court; 1983–1988	Succeeded by Ren Jianxin
