= Luo Ruiqing =

Chinese military officer (1906–1978)

- Born: May 31, 1906; Nanchong, Sichuan, China
- Died: August 3, 1978 (aged 72); Heidelberg, West Germany
- Military career
- Allegiance: China
- Branch: People's Liberation Army
- Service years: 1928–1966
- Rank: Grand General
- Nickname: Luo the Tall
- Commands: Commander-in-chief of the 2nd Army Group, North China, Chief of Joint Staff
- Conflicts: Northern Expedition; Long March; Hundred Regiments Offensive; Chinese Civil War; Campaign to the North of Baoding; Korean War; Sino-Indian War
- Awards: Order of Bayi (First Class Medal); Order of Independence and Freedom (First Class Medal); Order of Liberation (China) (First Class Medal); Hero of Democratic People's Republic of Korea
- Other work: Politician, Writer

Luo Ruiqing
- Traditional Chinese: 羅瑞卿
- Simplified Chinese: 罗瑞卿
Transcriptions
Standard Mandarin
- Hanyu Pinyin: Luó Ruìqīng
- Wade–Giles: Lo^{2} Jui^{4}-ch'ing^{1}

Luo Ruiqing (simplified Chinese: 罗瑞卿; traditional Chinese: 羅瑞卿; pinyin: Luó Ruìqīng; May 31, 1906 – August 3, 1978), formerly romanized as Lo Jui-ch'ing, was a Chinese army officer and politician, general of the People's Liberation Army. As the first Minister of Public Security from 1949 to 1959, he established the security and police apparatus of the People's Republic of China after the Communist victory in the civil war, and then served as the Chief of the Joint Staff from 1959 to 1965, achieving military victory in the Sino-Indian War.

Despite being a close associate and supporter of Mao Zedong for decades, Luo was targeted, purged, and severely beaten during the Cultural Revolution, which he opposed from the beginning.

== Biography ==
Luo Ruiqing was born in Nanchong, Sichuan in 1906 and joined the Chinese Communist Party in 1928 at the age of 22. He was the eldest son of a wealthy landlord named Luo Chunting (罗春庭), who had a total of six children. However, Luo Chunting was an opium addict and lost all his wealth due to his addiction, and the entire family had to rely on Luo Ruiqing's mother, who left no first name, but only her surname Xian (鲜). Despite the decline in family wealth, Luo's family was still able to afford the large sum of money needed for his education, and this fact was used by the Red Guards to attack Luo during the Cultural Revolution. Luo's early life was deliberately ignored in official Chinese records until the 1990s because his petty bourgeois background did not fit into the political environment until the end of the 20th century.

Luo participated in the Long March and held several security posts in the People's Liberation Army. He was transferred to Shaanxi to oversee the training of young cadres. He led several purges of supporters of former General Secretary Wang Ming. He was then put in charge of eliminating the faction loyal to Zhang Guotao, Mao Zedong's rival in the Fourth Front Army, shortly after his political defeat.

After the founding of the People's Republic of China, Luo was appointed Minister of Public Security and a member of the Central Military Commission. As such, he was responsible for consolidating the new system against its internal enemies; in 1950, at a conference in Beijing, he supported the establishment of a paramilitary force under his ministry, similar to the Soviet MVD.

Luo fought in the Korean War from 1950 to 1953. In 1955, he was decorated as Da Jiang, or General of the Army, the highest rank of general in the People's Liberation Army.

At the Eighth National Congress of the Chinese Communist Party in 1956, he was elected a member of the Central Committee and its Secretariat, and Secretary-General of the Central Military Commission. He was also elected a Vice-Premier of the State Council in 1959.

After Huang Kecheng was removed from his posts along with Peng Dehuai in 1959, Luo replaced him as chief of the Joint Staff. However, Luo began to drift away from Lin Biao, drawing closer to He Long, and eventually to his ally Liu Shaoqi, whom Mao increasingly distrusted. In order to remove Liu, Mao needed to wrestle the military away from Liu's supporters, and exploited the dissatisfaction of other military leaders with a distribution of power that favoured Luo Ruiqing, who by 1965 occupied thirteen important positions within the People's Liberation Army.

During the early stages of the Cultural Revolution, he was branded as part of the "Peng-Luo-Lu-Yang Anti-Party Clique" (with Peng Zhen, Lu Dingyi, and Yang Shangkun). In October 1968, Luo was relieved of all his posts. After criticism sessions, he attempted suicide by jumping from the third floor of a building in the Jingxi Hotel, leaving behind a suicide note that declared the correctness of the party. However, he survived with both legs broken. This was seen as proof of his guilt, and he received further public criticism after he recovered. He was hospitalized several times in the following years and had his left leg amputated in 1969.

Luo was rehabilitated by Mao during a meeting of the Central Military Commission in 1975, when Mao realized that Lin Biao had fabricated a case against the former general. In 1977, Luo was elected to the 11th Central Committee and regained his post as CMC Secretary-General.

Luo died on August 3, 1978, while in West Germany for medical treatment.

== See also ==
- Campaign to Suppress Counterrevolutionaries

Political offices
New title	Minister of Public Security of the People's Republic of China; 1949–1959	Succeeded by Xie Fuzhi
Military offices
Preceded by Huang Kecheng	Head of the Joint Staff Department of the Central Military Commission; 1959–1965	Succeeded by Yang Chengwu
