= China Law Society =

- 中国法学会
- Formation: July 1982
- Type: People's organization
- Headquarters: No. 4 Zaojun Temple, Haidian, Beijing
- President: Chen Wenqing
- Party Secretary: Wang Hongxiang
- Website: www.chinalaw.org.cn

China Law Society
- Simplified Chinese: 中国法学会
- Traditional Chinese: 中國法學會
Transcriptions
Standard Mandarin
- Hanyu Pinyin: Zhōngguó Fǎxuéhuì

The China Law Society is the official people's organization of Chinese legal academic professionals. It was established in 1982 and has sub-institutions of different fields of law, such as jurisprudence, constitutional law, civil law, criminal law, etc.

In 2015, the China Law Society established the Leading Group for Drafting Civil Code, led by society vice president Zhang Mingqi.

== List of presidents ==
- Wu Xinyu (武新宇): July 1982 – November 1983
- Zhang Youyu (张友渔): November 1983 – August 1985
- Wang Zhongfang (王仲方): August 1985 – May 1991
- Zou Yu (邹瑜): May 1991 – January 1997
- Ren Jianxin (任建新): January 1997 – November 2003
- Han Zhubin (韩杼滨): November 2003 – November 2013
- Wang Lequan (王乐泉): November 2013 – March 2019
- Wang Chen (王晨): March 2019 – January 2025
- Chen Wenqing (陈文清): January 2025 – (incumbent)

== See also ==
- Law Yearbook of China
- Chinese Society of International Law
