= Han Zhubin =

Chinese politician (born 1932)

- 韩杼滨

President of the China Law Society
- In office November 2003 – November 2013
- Preceded by: Ren Jianxin
- Succeeded by: Wang Lequan

Procurator-General of the Supreme People's Procuratorate
- In office 17 March 1998 – 16 March 2003
- Preceded by: Zhang Siqing
- Succeeded by: Jia Chunwang

Minister of Railways
- In office September 1992 – March 1998
- Premier: Li Peng
- Preceded by: Li Senmao
- Succeeded by: Fu Zhihuan

Personal details
- Born: February 1932 (age 94) Harbin
- Party: Chinese Communist Party

Han Zhubin (simplified Chinese: 韩杼滨; traditional Chinese: 韓杼濱; pinyin: Hán Zhùbīn; born February 1932) is a Chinese retired politician who was the procurator-general of the Supreme People's Procuratorate from March 1998 to March 2003, and the president of China Law Society from November 2003 to November 2013.

== Biography ==
A native to Harbin, Heilongjiang, Han Zhubin joined the Chinese Communist Party in 1950.

Han worked in the railway system since 1946. He was the Minister of Railways from 1992 to 1998, and the Procurator-General of the Supreme People's Procuratorate from 1998 to 2003.

Han served as a Deputy Secretary of the Central Commission for Discipline Inspection (CCDI) and as a member of the 15th CCDI Standing Committee in the period 1997–2002.

Legal offices
Preceded by Zhang Siqing	Procurator-General of the Supreme People's Procuratorate; 1998–2003	Succeeded by Jia Chunwang
Government offices
Preceded by Li Senmao	Minister of Railways; 1992–1998	Succeeded by Fu Zhihuan
Academic offices
Preceded by Ren Jianxin	President of China Law Society; 2003–2013	Succeeded by Wang Lequan
