= Zhang Jun (politician) =

Chinese politician

Chief Justice Zhang Jun
- 张军
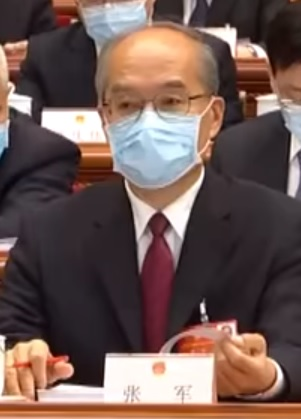
- Zhang in 2020

President of the Supreme People's Court and Chief Justice of the People's Republic of China
- Incumbent
- Assumed office 11 March 2023
- Preceded by: Zhou Qiang

Procurator-General of the Supreme People's Procuratorate
- In office March 2018 – 11 March 2023
- Preceded by: Cao Jianming
- Succeeded by: Ying Yong

Minister of Justice
- In office 24 February 2017 – 19 March 2018
- Premier: Li Keqiang
- Preceded by: Wu Aiying
- Succeeded by: Fu Zhenghua

Personal details
- Born: October 1956 (age 69–70) Boxing County, Shandong, China
- Party: Chinese Communist Party
- Education: Jilin University (UG); Renmin University (LLM); Wuhan University (LLD)

Zhang Jun (Chinese: 张军; pinyin: Zhāng Jūn; born October 1956) is a Chinese lawyer and politician who has been serving as President of the Supreme People's Court and Chief Justice of the People's Republic of China since March 2023.

He served as the Procurator-General of the Supreme People's Procuratorate from 2018 and 2023 and as Minister of Justice of China from 2017 to 2018. He formerly served as vice minister of Justice and vice president of China's Supreme People's Court.

== Biography ==
Zhang was born in Boxing County, Shandong province, and joined the Chinese Communist Party (CCP) in May 1974.

Zhang graduated from Jilin University's department of law in 1982. He received a Master of Law in criminal law from the Renmin University of China in 1985 and a Doctor of Law in criminal law from Wuhan University in 2006.

Zhang joined the Changchun municipal propaganda department under the Communist Youth League of China in 1975. In 1978, with the restoration of state exams, he was able to join the Jilin University's faculty of law. He started working in the Supreme People's Court in 1985.

During his tenure in the Supreme People's Court, Zhang served as clerk of the criminal office, deputy director and later director of the criminal department, deputy director of research and other roles, receiver of special government allowances in 2000. In 2001, Zhang had briefly served as executive vice president of the Beijing Municipal Higher People's Court; and upon his return to the Supreme People's Court, he was promoted to vice president of the higher courts, membership in the trial committee and was made a judge.

In July 2003, he transferred to serve as vice minister of Justice. From April 2008 onward, he served as deputy party group secretary of the Supreme People's Court, becoming a minister-level official. In November 2011, Zhang was promoted to judge of the first grade.

In October 2012, Zhang resigned his posts in the Supreme People's Court and in the 8th session of the Seventeenth Chinese Communist Party Central Commission for Discipline Inspection, he was selected as deputy secretary. In November 2012, Zhang extended his term as deputy secretary of the CCDI during the first session of the 18th Central Commission for Discipline Inspection.

In February 2017, Zhang was appointed as the Minister of Justice by the Standing Committee of the National People's Congress.

In March 2018, Zhang was elected as the procurator-general of the Supreme People's Procuratorate.

In March 2023, Zhang was appointed as the president of the Supreme People's Court, making him the only person to have ever served as head of both the highest institutions of judiciary and prosecution to date.

== Academia ==
- Vice President of China's Criminal Law Research Society

Government offices
Preceded by Wu Aiying	Minister of Justice; 2017–2018	Succeeded by Fu Zhenghua
Legal offices
Preceded by Cao Jianming	Procurator-General of the Supreme People's Procuratorate; 2018–2023	Succeeded by Ying Yong
Preceded by Zhou Qiang	President of the Supreme People's Court; 2023–present	Incumbent
