= National Judges College =

University in Beijing, China

Coordinates: 39.9129°N 116.6220°E

- 国家法官学院
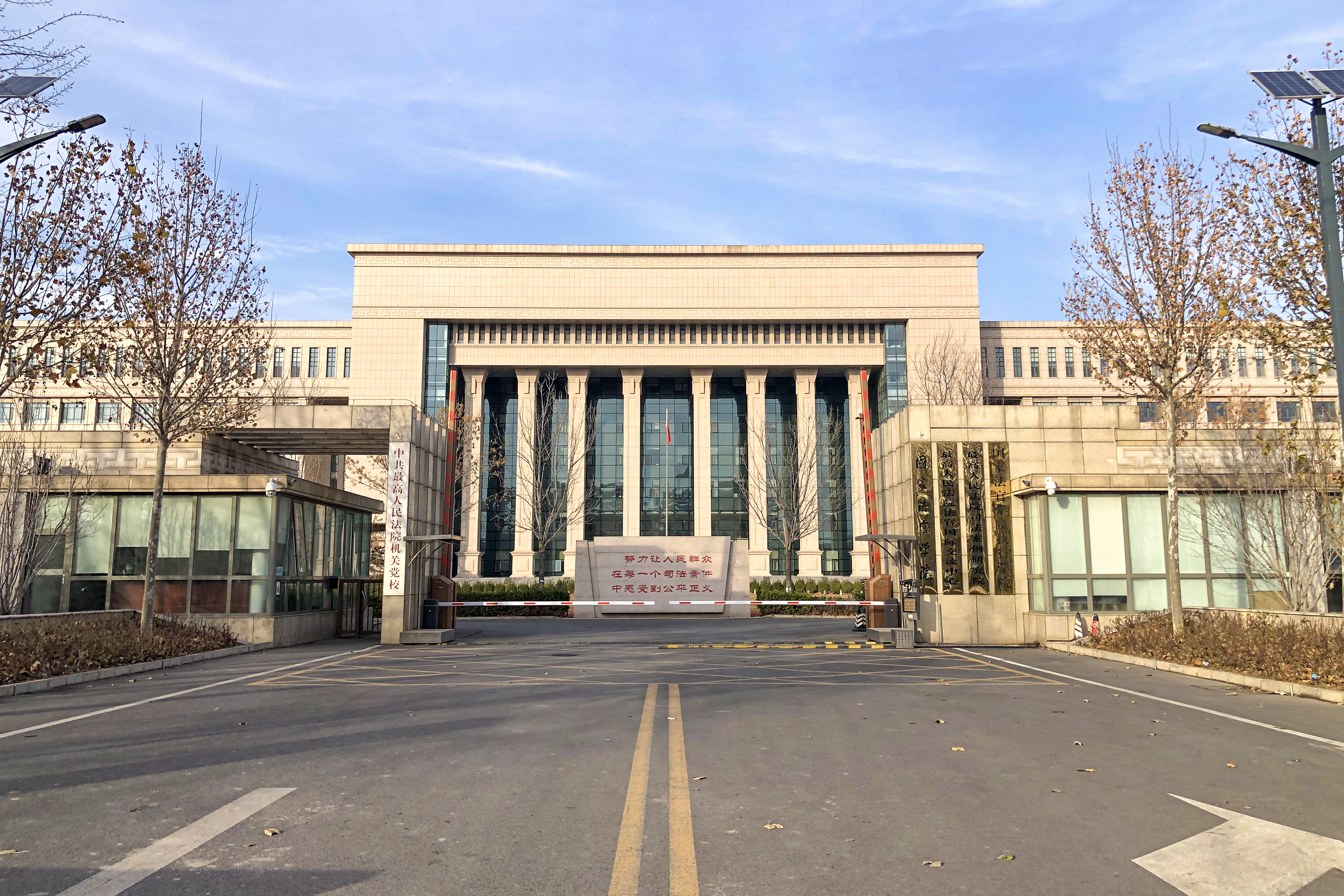
- Type: Public
- Established: 1997
- Location: Beijing, China
- Campus: Urban
- Website: njc.chinacourt.org

National Judges College (Chinese: 国家法官学院; pinyin: Guójiā Fǎguān Xuéyuàn) is an educational institute in Beijing under the Supreme People's Court. It is responsible for training the judges of the People's Republic of China. It was established in 1997 and has 12 branches in the high people's courts in Beijing, Shanghai, Tianjin, Inner Mongolia, Sichuan, Shandong, Heilongjiang, Henan, Gansu, Guangdong, Guangxi, and Jiangsu.
