= Jia Chunwang =

Chinese politician (born 1938)

- 贾春旺
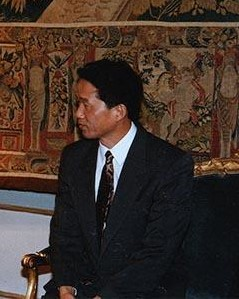
- Jia at a meeting with Italian president Oscar Luigi Scalfaro in 1992

Procurator-General of the Supreme People's Procuratorate
- In office 7 March 2003 – 5 March 2008
- Preceded by: Han Zhubin
- Succeeded by: Cao Jianming

Minister of Public Security
- In office 19 March 1998 – 28 December 2002
- Premier: Zhu Rongji
- Preceded by: Tao Siju
- Succeeded by: Zhou Yongkang

Minister of State Security
- In office 1 September 1985 – 1 March 1998
- Premier: Li Peng
- Preceded by: Ling Yun
- Succeeded by: Xu Yongyue

Personal details
- Born: May 1938 (age 88) Beijing, Republic of China
- Party: Chinese Communist Party
- Spouse: Yu Jingzhi
- Education: Beijing No. 8 High School
- Alma mater: Tsinghua University

Jia Chunwang (simplified Chinese: 贾春旺; traditional Chinese: 賈春旺; pinyin: Jiǎ Chūnwàng; born May 1938) is a Chinese politician, intelligence officer, and prosecutor who held top positions in both the security apparatus and judiciary of the People's Republic of China. He served as Minister of State Security for 13 years (1985–1998), as Minister of Public Security (1998–2002) and finally as the procurator-general of the Supreme People's Procuratorate (2003–2008).

The longest-serving Minister of State Security to date, he is also regarded as the most influential, greatly expanding the size, budget and capabilities of the MSS during a pivotal time, which saw tactical collaboration with the American Central Intelligence Agency in arming, training and funding Afghan guerrillas against the Soviets, the 1989 Tiananmen Square protests and massacre, the end of the Cold War and the subsequent establishment of good relations with Russia, and the handover of Hong Kong from British to Chinese control.

== Biography ==
Jia, a native of Beijing, was born in May 1938 and studied at Tsinghua University, graduating with a degree in nuclear physics. He joined the Chinese Communist Party in 1962, and in 1964 he began teaching physics at Tsinghua University, while at the same time being active in the Communist Party branch within the university, called being a "double-load cadre". In some foreign newspaper articles during the 1980s and 1990s, he was incorrectly referred to as an engineer; for example, in 1991 the New York Times described him thus: "the nation's spymaster, Jia Chunwang, who is Minister of State Security, is a 53-year-old English-speaking engineer". This confusion derived from the fact that the Tsinghua faculty from which Jia graduated was called the "Department of Engineering Physics", although Jia actually completed the nuclear physics program.

In 1966, at the start of the Cultural Revolution, he was attacked and beaten up by Red Guards, dismissed from the university, and sent to work in rural farms. In 1972 he returned to Tsinghua and became a professor of physics, as well as secretary of the university's Communist Youth League. In 1983 Jia was one of the young officials chosen for senior positions when Deng sidelined older cadre. His prospects improved when he became an acolyte of vice premier Qiao Shi. He steadily rose within the Communist Party and was eventually named Party Secretary of Beijing's Haidian District. In 1984, he became Secretary of the Beijing branch of the powerful Central Commission for Discipline Inspection, the Party's internal watchdog.

In 1985, he was appointed Minister of State Security, thus overseeing China's most important intelligence and security agency, responsible for foreign intelligence, counter-intelligence and regime protection. He remained on this post for 13 years, until 1998, the longest tenure in the Ministry's history so far. In 1998, he was moved to the Ministry of Public Security (supervising regular police and security forces) where he remained until 2002, while also being named Political Commissar of the People's Armed Police.

Finally, he served as deputy procurator–general (2002–2003) and procurator–general (2003–2008) of the Supreme People's Procuratorate, thus being China's highest-ranked prosecutor. In 2006, he was elected President of the International Association of Anti-Corruption Authorities.

Jia was described as low-key and self-effacing; his wife, Yu Jingzhi, is also a professor at Tsinghua University.

Jia Chunwang was a member of the 13th, 14th, 15th, and 16th Communist Party Central Committees, from 1987 to 2007.

== Afghanistan ==
As Minister of State Security, Jia Chunwang continued and expanded the close collaboration with the American CIA and with Pakistan in training Afghan guerrillas against the Soviets. Beginning in February 1980, Chinese intelligence, led at the time by Luo Qingchang, had started offering small arms and financial support to Afghan resistance groups. From 1980 to 1984 the cost of Chinese support totaled approximately $400 million. When Jia Chunwang became head of the MSS, support expanded to include heavy machine guns, mortars, recoilless rifles, rocket launchers and anti-aircraft artillery; the MSS, in collaboration with the Intelligence Bureau of the PLA General Staff, provided these weapons to a number of Afghan resistance groups established by the Chinese themselves, including "Victory", "Guards", "Immortal Flame" and "Paikar". The Afghans were trained in two networks of secret military camps, both in Xinjiang; one network of camps was in the vicinity of Kashgar, the other in the vicinity of Hotan. Hundreds of Chinese advisers also worked in Pakistani training camps, along the Afghanistan-Pakistan border.

== Tiananmen crackdown and expulsion of George Soros foundations ==
As Minister of State Security, Jia Chunwang played a major role in expelling from China all foundations and organizations funded by, or collaborating with, Hungarian-American billionaire George Soros. Soros began working in China in spring 1986, by funding research for strengthening China's reform and opening up. Then, in October 1986, Soros collaborated with Li Xianglu of the "Association of Young Chinese Economists" to establish a Beijing office for his foundations, and Zhao Ziyang (then Premier) approved. Soon thereafter Soros sent a message that he was interested in establishing personal relations with senior Communist Party leaders to exchange views on problems of economic reform in China. By May 1989 Soros had spent millions of dollars in China, working in four areas: travel expenses for Chinese scholars to visit the United States, the purchase of Western books on the social sciences for Chinese universities, establishment of political reform associations, and certain cultural activities.

Jia Chunwang and the MSS were closely watching the activities of Soros the whole time, and in fact, the head of the Beijing office that Soros established was actually an MSS agent posing as an economic reformer. On 23 May 1989 (just before the 1989 Tiananmen Square crackdown) all Soros-related foundations and organizations were forcibly dissolved and shut down, and Soros himself was warned that "he was not welcome" in China anymore. Soros was only allowed to visit China again 12 years later in 2001.

Jia was also instrumental in the actual crackdown and military suppression of the Tiananmen protests. On 1 June 1989, three days before the massacre, an MSS report written mostly by Jia himself and titled "On ideological and political infiltration into our country from the United States and other international political forces", was delivered to every single member of the Politburo, and to senior Party elders, including Deng Xiaoping, Li Xiannian and Chen Yun, advocating for immediate military action and placing responsibility for the protests and the turmoil on foreign, hostile Western forces:

"The great socialist country of China has always been a major target for the peaceful evolution methods of the Western capitalist countries headed by the United States. Since the founding of the People's Republic of China and after the failure of U.S. armed intervention, each American administration has pursued the same goal of peaceful evolution and has done a great deal of mischief aimed at overthrowing the Communist Party and sabotaging the socialist system. Carter preached "peace diplomacy"; Reagan promoted "democratic movements"; and Bush emphasizes "human rights diplomacy". The phraseology may vary, but the essence remains the same: to cultivate so-called democratic forces within socialist countries and to stimulate and organize political opposition using catchwords like "democracy", "liberty", and "human rights". These people also try to win over or split off wavering elements within the Party in hopes of fomenting peaceful evolution inside the Party, thereby causing, or forcing, changes in the nature of political power in our Socialist State.

...

Every night for four weeks, a ranking official of the U.S. Embassy in China, who said that "the American government is extremely concerned about this significant movement", met with participants in the student movement. The Director of the Beijing office of the U.S.-based Committee on Scholarly Communication with the PRC invited students from Peking University, People's University, and the Beijing Foreign Languages Institute to his residence many times for discussions, thereby exerting influence on them. American students studying at Peking University, People's University, Beijing Language Institute, and nine other universities went everywhere fanning the flames. American journalists in Beijing maintained close contact with the leaders of the AFS. Journalists from the Associated Press and Newsweek told Wuerkaixi and others that the United States would, if necessary, provide asylum for them or help them go to the United States to study. And not only all this, they also tried to build counterrevolutionary armed forces in China. The China Study Group of the U.S. State Department submitted a report in May claiming that the democracy movement in China was part of the world democracy movement.

...

Many facts demonstrate that the international monopoly capitalists and hostile, reactionary foreign forces have not abandoned for a moment their intent to destroy us. It is now clear, that murderous intent has always lurked behind their protestations of peace and friendship. When the opportunity arises they will remove the façade and reveal their true colors. They have only one goal: to annihilate socialism.

Legal offices
Preceded by Han Zhubin	Procurator-General of the Supreme People's Procuratorate; 2003–2008	Succeeded by Cao Jianming
Government offices
Preceded by Tao Siju	Minister of Public Security; 1998–2002	Succeeded by Zhou Yongkang
Preceded by Ling Yun	Minister of State Security; 1985–1998	Succeeded by Xu Yongyue
