= Supreme People's Procuratorate =

Chinese national legal agency

Supreme People's Procuratorate of the People's Republic of China
- 中华人民共和国最高人民检察院
- Emblem of the People's Procuratorate of the People's Republic of China

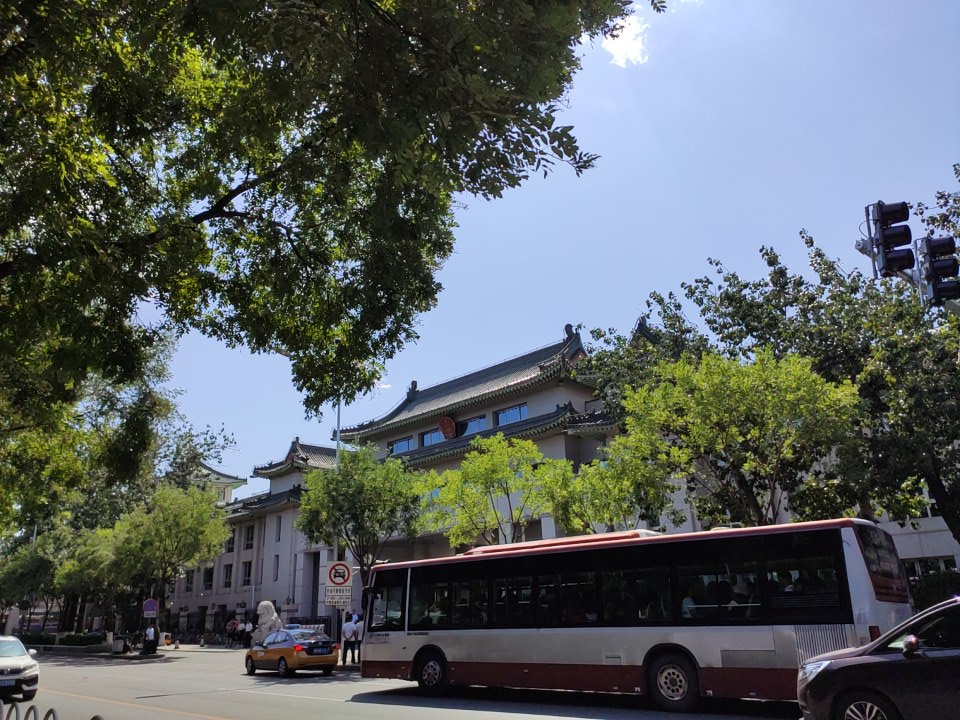
- External gate of the Supreme People's Procuratorate

Agency overview
- Formed: 27 September 1954; 71 years ago
- Type: China's highest legal supervision agency
- Jurisdiction: People's Republic of China
- Headquarters: Beijing
- Agency executives: Ying Yong, Prosecutor-General; Tong Jianming, Executive Deputy Prosecutor-General; Sun Qian, Deputy Prosecutor-General; Zhang Xueqiao, Deputy Prosecutor-General; Chen Guoqing, Deputy Prosecutor-General; Liu Wei, Head of the Disciplinary Inspection and Supervision Team; Pan Yiqin, Director of the Political Department; Gong Ming, Deputy Prosecutor-General; Zhang Zhijie, Deputy Prosecutor-General
- Parent agency: National People's Congress
- Website: www.spp.gov.cn

Supreme People's Procuratorate
- Traditional Chinese: 中華人民共和國最高人民檢察院
- Simplified Chinese: 中华人民共和国最高人民检察院
Transcriptions
Standard Mandarin
- Hanyu Pinyin: Zhōnghuá rénmín gònghéguó zuìgāo rénmín jiǎncháyuàn

Commonly abbreviated as
- Traditional Chinese: 中國檢察
- Simplified Chinese: 中国检察
Transcriptions
Standard Mandarin
- Hanyu Pinyin: Zhōngguó Jiǎnchá

Also abbreviated as
- Traditional Chinese: 最高檢
- Simplified Chinese: 最高检
Transcriptions
Standard Mandarin
- Hanyu Pinyin: Zuìgāo Jiǎn

The Supreme People's Procuratorate of the People's Republic of China (SPP) is the country's highest national agency responsible for prosecutorial investigation and legal prosecution. The SPP reports to the National People's Congress (NPC). The Procuratorate acts as a public prosecutor for criminal cases, conducting both the relevant investigations and prosecutions of such cases. The agency also reviews the legal rulings of the local and special procuratorates, the lower people's courts, and issues judicial interpretations.

Conceived initially in 1949 as the Supreme People's Prosecutor's Office, the agency was renamed the Supreme People's Procuratorate in 1954. The Procuratorate was abolished during the Cultural Revolution, before being re-instated in 1978. Between the 1990s and 2010s, the agency experienced a host of reforms pertaining to its selection of personnel, internal organization and role in the management of corruption. In March 2018, the Supreme People's Procuratorate's initial investigation of corruption cases by government officials was transferred to the newly formed National Supervisory Commission.

The Supreme People's Procuratorate is organized into ten specialized prosecutor's offices, which operate under the direction of a Procuratorial Committee. Led by a Prosecutor-General, the Procuratorate is also composed of several Deputy Prosecutors-General and additional prosecutors. The Prosecutor-General is appointed by the NPC, which also elects the other members of the Supreme People's Procuratorate at the Prosecutor-General's recommendation. The current Prosecutor-General of the People's Republic of China is Ying Yong.

== History ==
=== Origins ===
The most rudimentary version of the Supreme People's Procuratorate was established in September 1949 with the promulgation of the Organic Law of the Central People's Government. Initially titled the "People's Prosecutor-General's Office", the Supreme People's Procuratorate was the first national agency tasked with the supervision of the law in the newly founded People's Republic of China.

The responsibilities of the initial Procuratorate were formalized in the 1951 Statutes. As described by academics Ginsburgs and Stahnke, the agency's powers encompassed:

- Overseeing the abidance of the law by all individuals, public organizations and state agencies;
- The investigation of individuals who breach the law or state interests;
- The ability to reject judgements made by lower judicial bodies;
- The supervision of legal abidance in the nation-wide prison system;
- The ability to review and reopen cases dropped by lower procuratorates when petitioned;
- Serving as a legal representative for the Party's interests in civil and administrative lawsuits.

Alongside these functions, the Procuratorate was able to prosecute anyone deemed suspicious and warranting investigation and could request information from other state organs to assist with the prosecutorial process. The Procuratorate also had the ability to establish an office in each local government area to supervise and lead the judicial system in the locality. However, the Procuratorate was largely inactive following its inception. This changed in 1953 when investigation departments within the body were created.

=== Rise and early years ===
In 1954, the People's Prosecutor-General's Office was renamed the "Supreme People's Procuratorate" at the first session of the First National People's Congress. The new Procuratorate was formally enacted in the 1954 State Constitution subsequently adopted by the Congress, retaining its legal supervisory role. The jurisdiction of the Procuratorate was established as encompassing all government bodies, public functionaries and citizens of China, except the Central People's Government, which oversaw the agency's operation.

=== Cultural Revolution ===
During the Cultural Revolution of 1966 – 1976, the people's procuratorates lost favor as they were perceived as an interference to the ideology of the Chinese Communist Party. Reflecting this sentiment, the Supreme People's Procuratorate was abolished from the 1975 State Constitution alongside all other procuratorates. Following its dissolution, the Procuratorate's powers of legal supervision over the state and individuals were transferred to the police. The Supreme People's Procuratorate was subsequently re-established in 1978 via the reinstatement of the Organic Law of the People's Procuratorates in the 1978 State Constitution. Its renewal served as a mechanism for the Party to oversee and prevent misconduct within the administration.

In 1980, the Supreme People's Procuratorate established a Special Procuratorate to investigate and prosecute the Lin Biao and Jiang Qing "counter-revolutionary cliques." In a trial led by the serving Prosecutor-General Huang Huoqing, the defendants were found guilty of plotting a coup to overthrow the leaders of the Chinese Communist Party during the Cultural Revolution.

=== Development and reform ===
In the 1990s, major reforms were made to the Chinese judicial system, including the people's courts and procuratorates. These changes occurred primarily in response to the reform and opening up as a socialist market economy, a development instigated by Deng Xiaoping's southern tour in 1992. In 1995, the Procurator's Law was introduced to "professionalize the judicial personnel" by raising the stringency of the requirements used to select procurators and other procuratorate personnel. Emphasis was placed on the selection of prosecutors and personnel based on merit, performance and experience in legal practice.

Further reform of the Procuratorate accompanied the adoption of the "Implementing Opinions of the Three-Year Procuratorial Reform" in January 2000. This reform affirmed the hierarchy of the procuratorates and formalised the role of the higher procuratorates supervising and directing procuratorates located beneath them. Alongside the reform, a new training program for procurators was introduced from 2001–2005 to manage workforce performance within the Procuratorate.

In December 2018, major alterations were made to the internal organization of the Supreme People's Procuratorate through the restructuring of existing departments and the establishment of ten new prosecutor's offices. Four of these offices were established to handle the prosecution of various types of criminal cases. The remaining six departments oversee "civil, administrative, public interest and juvenile cases, complaints handling, and investigation into duty crimes committed by judicial personnel," respectively, as reported by Xinhua News Agency, China's official state-run media agency.

In November 2020, the Intellectual Property Prosecution Office of the Supreme People's Procuratorate was established to handle the investigation and prosecution of intellectual property rights infringements.

=== Anti-corruption enforcement ===
In 1979, the Supreme People's Procuratorate began its involvement in the investigation and prosecution of corruption by establishing a specialized department to investigate economic crimes. Further pressure from student activists and Party members alike in the early 1990s led to the people's procuratorates developing more stringent protocols to manage corruption. Anti-corruption enforcement by the Supreme People's Procuratorate's grew in 1995 with the introduction of three new departments to manage corruption: the Anti-Corruption and Bribery Bureau, the Corruption Prevention Department, and the Anti-Dereliction of Duty and Infringement of Citizens' Rights Department. However, the Procuratorate's supervision of corruption was later streamlined by legislation from the National People's Congress in late 2014, which resulted in the amalgamation of the agency's three anti-corruption departments into a single anti-corruption authority.

In May 2017, the Supreme People's Procuratorate's Anti-Corruption Bureau and Alibaba "to create a clean, credible, rule-of-law market environment." Pursuant to the memorandum, the Bureau provides Alibaba and Ant Group with access to criminal records from bribery cases and Alibaba and Ant Group query those records including during verification of Taobao sellers and in connection with anti-money laundering initiatives and financial risk controls.

The management of corruption by the Chinese Communist Party was broadly transformed in 2018. At the March meeting of the 13th National People's Congress, a new anti-corruption agency titled the National Supervisory Commission was formally installed to consolidate the various anti-corruption authorities which existed under the Party, including those of the Procuratorate. The Supreme People's Procuratorate role in anti-corruption enforcement was largely rescinded, with all these responsibilities directly transferred to the new National Supervisory Commission. The Procuratorate's anti-corruption personnel saw a similar transition.

== Powers and jurisdiction ==
The Supreme People's Procuratorate serves as the highest prosecutorial power in the People's Republic of China, overseeing the nation's local and special procuratorates. As determined by the Organic Law, the primary function of the Procuratorate is to suppress illegal activities, particularly those which undermine the interests of China's ruling party, the Chinese Communist Party.

The jurisdiction of the Procuratorate encompasses all cases related to criminal law, public and state security, people's courts, prisons, detention centers and labour institutions within the People's Republic of China. The agency does not oversee the prosecution of cases from the special administrative regions of Hong Kong or Macau, except those that are investigated by the Office for Safeguarding National Security of the Central People's Government of the People's Republic of China in the Hong Kong Special Administrative Region.

As specified in the Constitution of China, the Supreme People's Procuratorate nominally exerts its powers independently, without interference from "any administrative organ, social organization or individual." However, like the Supreme People's Court, the Supreme People's Procuratorate must report to the National People's Congress, the highest state body in China.

=== Prosecution and litigation ===
The Supreme People's Procuratorate acts as a public prosecutor by handling both the investigation and prosecution of criminal cases in court, thus functioning as a civil law inquisitorial system. Such systems are also seen in Japan and socialist legal systems. Within the Procuratorate, criminal prosecution is overseen by four specialized departments that oversee "regular crimes, serious crimes, duty crimes, and new-type crimes," respectively. The agency reviews and arbitrates on which criminal suspects should be investigated and which criminal cases should be taken to a public prosecution. It may also initiate public interest litigation.

Further guidance refines prosecutorial obligations toward defense counsel. In 2023, justice agencies issued the Ten Opinions on Protecting Lawyers’ Practice Rights in Accordance With Law, which in American and British would translate to Guidelines for Prosecutorial Conduct Toward Defense Counsel. The guidelines require prosecutors to use a centralized case-management system to administer attorney access to clients and discovery requests, provide notice to defense counsel of procedural actions, and ensure a right to be hear, particularly before pretrial detention or plea decisions. They also provide for internal oversight and complaint procedures, including a prosecutor liaison or on-site office in detention facilities and expedited timelines for attorney access complaints, which are incorporated into performance evaluations linked to compliance with attorney access policies and may lead to disciplinary sanctions for prosecutorial staff who violate attorney or defendant rights.

In addition to its prosecutorial authority, the agency has also developed prosecutorial tools to influence how corporate defendants are administered. In 2022, the chief prosecutor's office issued the Measures on Compliance Establishment, Assessment, and Review for Enterprises Involved in Criminal Cases (Provisional), which in American and British English translate to the Criminal Corporate Compliance Remediation, Assessment, and Review Interim Procedures. The procedures specify how prosecutors should use corporate compliance remediation to inform criminal case disposition. Under these procedures, independent compliance monitors assess whether an implicated entity has effectively ceased illegal conduct, uses internal compliance policies, and mitigated risks. Prosecutors then review the assessment reports. Where the assessment meets the provided criteria, the prosecutor's office may lawfully take the compliance results into account in deciding whether to arrest, modify pretrial restrictions, decline to prosecute, or recommend more lenient sentencing or administrative penalties.

=== Legal supervision ===
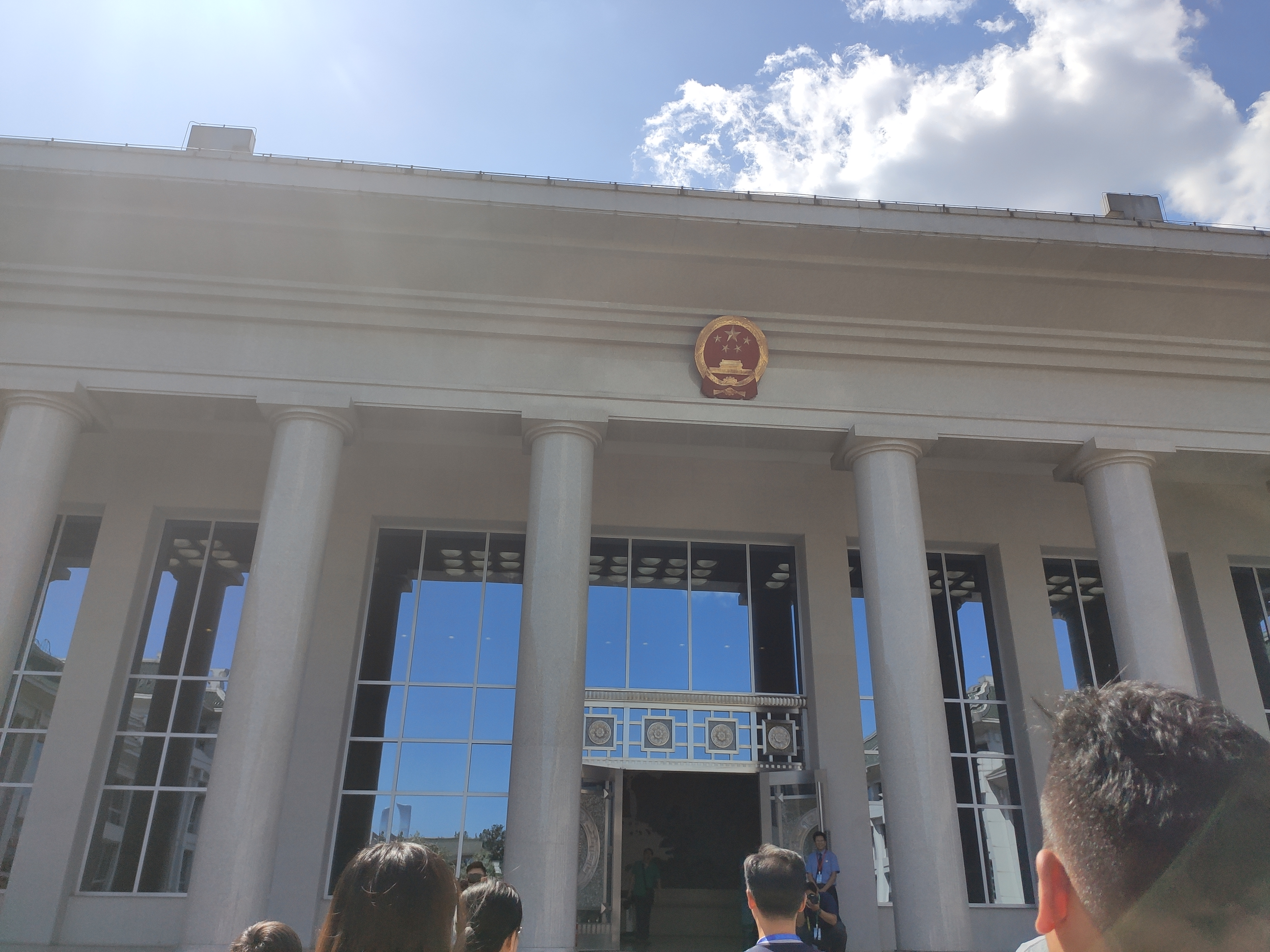
Exterior view of the Supreme People's Procuratorate headquarters

The Supreme People's Procuratorate conducts reviews of rulings and investigations performed by local and special procuratorates. Additionally, for all types of cases, the Procuratorate may protest any rulings of the lower people's courts that it deems inappropriate or flawed by lodging a formal appeal with the Supreme People's Court. For civil and administrative cases, including intellectual property cases, this intervention mainly occurs after the court has handed down a legally binding and enforceable decision. The Procuratorate may act in this manner by choice or when petitioned by a litigant involved in a given case.

=== Judicial interpretations ===
The Procuratorate, either independently or in conjunction with the Supreme People's Court, may also issue judicial interpretations, which are official and legally binding interpretations of the law. These interpretations may serve as "replies" to individual cases, reminiscent of Roman law, or apply more broadly. Despite theoretically possessing less legal authority than the law, academics C.H. van Rhee and Yulin Fu perceive the Procuratorate's judicial interpretations as being "almost as effective as law" in court.

=== Supervision of the state ===
Between the 1980s to the early 2010s, the Supreme People's Procuratorate investigated and prosecuted corruption and bribery through its anti-corruption departments. The Supreme People's Procuratorate also assisted the Central Commission for Discipline Inspection with the prosecution of party members relegated to a form of extralegal detention known as Shuanggui. Shuanggui is a procedure used to extract evidence and confessions from CCP members under investigation. Material obtained using Shuanggui was passed onto the Procuratorate and used in the prosecution of party members.

As of March 2018, the Supreme People's Procuratorate no longer performs these responsibilities. These powers have instead been assumed by the National Supervisory Commission, which campaigns against corruption in conjunction with the Central Commission for Discipline Inspection – the anti-graft agency of the Chinese Communist Party. Some academics prompted that these changes have reduced the overall power of the Procuratorate.

== Organisation ==
The Supreme People's Procuratorate is led by a Procurator-General, who serves as the Chief Grand Prosecutor and President of the Procuratorate. The office of the Prosecutor-General serves a five-year term, corresponding with the term length of the National People's Congress. Each Prosecutor-General may serve a maximum of two terms. The Prosecutor-General of the Supreme People's Procuratorate is elected by the National People's Congress, in accordance with the Procurators Law of the People's Republic of China. The National People's Congress also carries the executive ability to remove a serving Prosecutor-General from power.

In addition to the Prosecutor-General, the Supreme People's Procuratorate is also composed of multiple Deputy Prosecutors-General, members of the Procuratorial Committee and additional procurators. All other members of the Procuratorate are appointed by the Standing Committee of the National People's Congress at the Prosecutor-General's recommendation. Likewise, members may be removed from the Procuratorate at the will of the People's Congress and the Prosecutor-General.

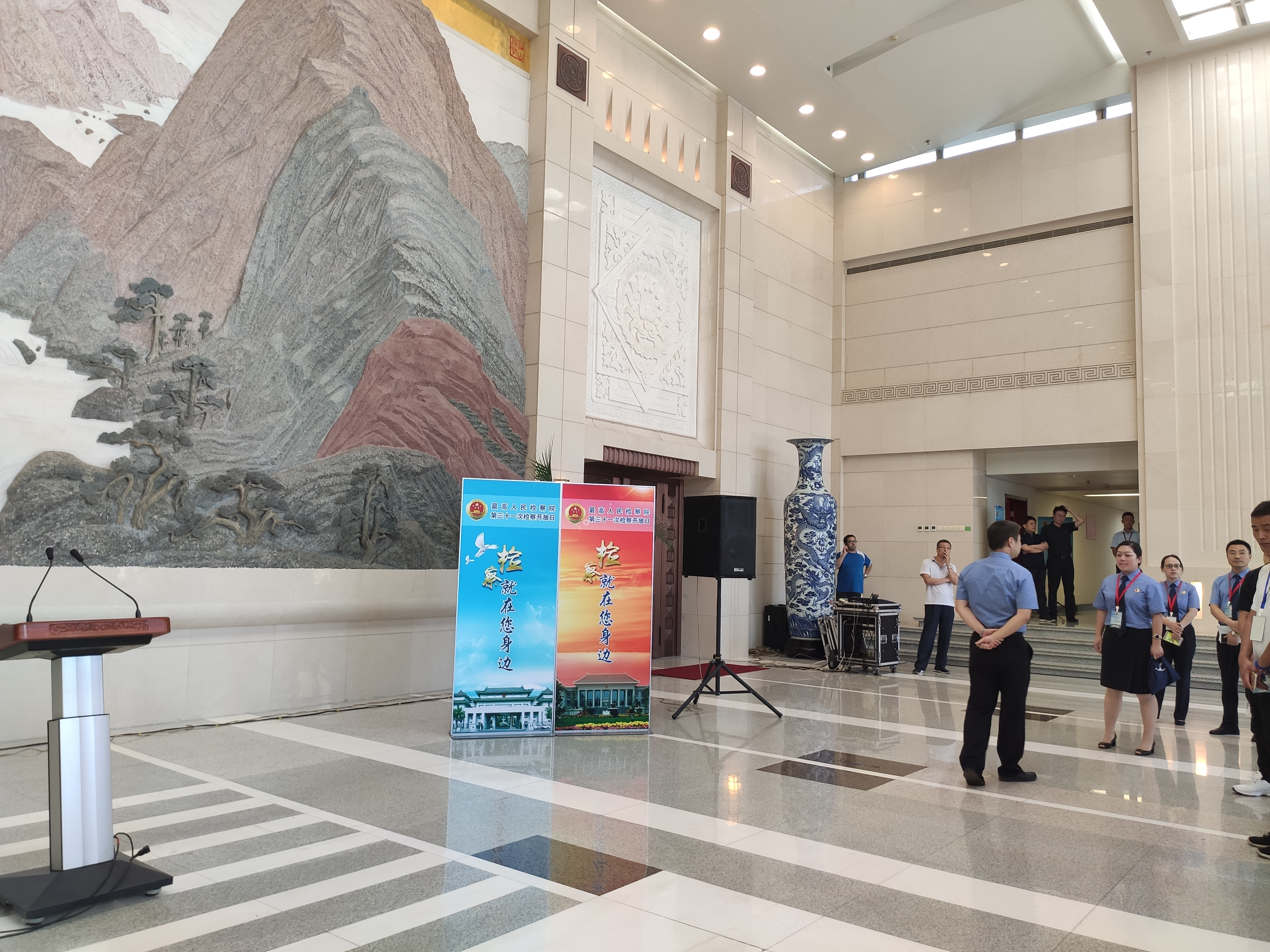
The lobby of the main building of the Supreme People's Procuratorate

The Supreme People's Procuratorate is led by a Procuratorial Committee, which oversees the operation of the Procuratorate under the direction of the Procurator-General. The agency is further organized into ten prosecutor's offices, which each oversee a specific type of crime or litigation. Various additional departments, such as the Political Work Department, also exist within the Procuratorate, to oversee additional affairs. Several subordinate institutions are also directly affiliated with the Procuratorate. The organisation of the Supreme People's Procuratorate is detailed below:

=== Executive bodies ===
- Procuratorial Committee of the Supreme People's Procuratorate
  - Office of the Prosecutor General
- Disciplinary Committee Against Procurators of the Supreme People’s Procuratorate

=== Internal departments ===
- General Affairs Office (Press Office)
- Political Work Department
- The First Prosecutor's Office (Regular Crime Prosecutor's Office)
- The Second Prosecutor's Office (Serious Crime Prosecutor's Office)
- The Third Prosecutor's Office (Occupational Crime Prosecutor's Office)
- The Fourth Prosecutor's Office (Economic Crime Prosecutor's Office, Intellectual Property Prosecution Office)
- Fifth Prosecutor's Office (Judicial Personnel Crime Prosecutor's Office)
- Sixth Prosecutor's Office (Civil Prosecutor's Office)
- Seventh Prosecutors' Office (Administrative Prosecutors' Office)
- The Eighth Prosecutor's Office (Public Interest Litigation Prosecutor's Office)
- The Ninth Procuratorate (Juvenile Case Prosecutor's Office)
- Tenth Prosecutor's Office (Complaint and Appeal Prosecutor's Office)
- Legal Policy Research Office
- International Cooperation Bureau
- Planning, Financial and Equipment Bureau
- Procuratorial Affairs Inspection Bureau
- Reporting and Charges Center
- Bureau of Retired Officers

=== Subordinate institutions ===
- Supreme People's Procuratorate Service Center
- The Procuratorate Daily (newspaper)
- China Procuratorate Publishing House
- Procuratorate Technology Information Research Center
- Procuratorate Theory Research Institute
- State Procurators College

== See also ==
- Supreme People's Court
- Supreme Prosecutors Office
- Director of Public Prosecutions
