= China University of Political Science and Law =

Public university in Beijing, China

- 中国政法大学
- Motto: 厚德、明法、格物、致公
- Type: Public university
- Established: 1952; 74 years ago
- President: Ma Huaide (马怀德)
- Location: Beijing, China; 39.9638°N 116.3447°E
- Website: cupl.edu.cn

The China University of Political Science and Law (CUPL; Chinese: 中国政法大学), also translated as Zhengfa University, is a national public university in Beijing, China. It is affiliated with the Ministry of Education and co-sponsored with the Beijing Municipal People's Government. The university is part of the prestigious Project 211 and the Double First-Class Construction.

The university focuses on the fields of law, politics, economics, management, sociology, history, and philosophy. CUPL has two campuses, one in Haidian as the original campus of the university, and the other located in Changping. At present, Haidian campus only conducts postgraduate education while undergraduates study on the larger Changping campus. In 2015, CUPL comprises 13 schools, with 15,833 students and 951 faculty members, of whom 290 are professors. CUPL maintains a broad international exchange program, with approximately 1000 foreign students from many countries.

== Rankings ==
University rankings

Regional – Overall
- QS Asia: =267 (2025)

The university features in the top 10 Asia universities in "Law and Legal Studies" as ranked by the QS World University Rankings by Subjects. As of 2023, it ranked 38th globally in "Law and Legal Studies" by the QS World University Rankings by Subjects. Also, it is consistenly ranked the best in China among universities specialized in "Political Science and Law" in the recognized Best Chinese Universities Ranking.
