= Central Comprehensive Law-based Governance Commission =

Body of the Central Committee of the Chinese Communist Party

- 中央全面依法治国委员会
- Emblem of the Chinese Communist Party

Agency overview
- Formed: March 2018
- Type: Policy coordination and consultation body
- Jurisdiction: Chinese Communist Party
- Headquarters: Beijing
- Agency executives: Xi Jinping, Director; Li Qiang, Deputy Director; Zhao Leji, Deputy Director; Wang Huning, Deputy Leader; Chen Wenqing, Office Director
- Parent agency: Central Committee of the Chinese Communist Party
- Child agency: Office

Central Comprehensive Law-based Governance Commission
- Simplified Chinese: 中央全面依法治国委员会
Transcriptions
Standard Mandarin
- Hanyu Pinyin: Zhōngyāng Quánmiàn Yīfǎ Zhìguó Wěiyuánhuì

The Central Comprehensive Law-based Governance Commission is an agency of the Central Committee of the Chinese Communist Party responsible for coordinating legal policy development.

== History ==
In 2014, the Chinese Communist Party (CCP) formally adopted a policy of constructing a "socialist rule of law with Chinese characteristics." In October 2017, CCP General Secretary Xi Jinping proposed in his report to the 19th CCP National Congress that a central leading group for "comprehensively governing the country according to the law" be established to strengthen the CCP's leadership over the construction of law efforts in China.

The commission was established in March 2018 as part of the deepening the reform of the Party and state institutions. The first meeting of the Commission set out the official legislative agenda, which was subsequently adapted by the National People's Congress.

== Functions ==
The Central Comprehensive Law-based Governance Commission is the CCP's top body regarding development of China's legal and regulatory systems, promoting Xi's efforts at "law-based governance". The commission is tasked with leading law-based governance efforts at the top level through setting the legislative agenda and through administrative reforms. It outranks the Central Political and Legal Affairs Commission, which remains in charge of the day-to-day work of the country's judiciary, law-enforcement and security organs. Its office is housed in the Ministry of Justice.

== Membership ==
=== 20th Central Committee ===
- Director
  - Xi Jinping, General Secretary of the Chinese Communist Party, President of China, Chairman of the Central Military Commission
- Deputy Directors
  - Li Qiang, Premier of China, member of the Politburo Standing Committee of the Chinese Communist Party
  - Zhao Leji, Chairman of the Standing Committee of the National People's Congress, member of the Politburo Standing Committee of the Chinese Communist Party
  - Wang Huning, Chairman of the Chinese People's Political Consultative Conference, member of the Politburo Standing Committee of the Chinese Communist Party

=== Office leaders ===
==== Directors ====
- Guo Shengkun (2018 – 2023)
- Chen Wenqing (2023 – present)

==== Deputy Directors ====
- Fu Zhenghua (April 2018 – April 2020)
- Chen Yixin (March 2018 – March 2023)
- Tang Yijun (April 2020 – February 2023)
- He Rong (February 2023 – present)
- Ting Bai (March 2023 – present)
