= Cai Cheng =

Chinese politician

- 蔡诚

Minister of Justice of the People's Republic of China
- In office 12 April 1988 – 29 March 1993
- Preceded by: Zou Yu
- Succeeded by: Xiao Yang

Personal details
- Born: November 1927 Puning, Jieyang, Guangdong, Republic of China
- Died: 2 September 2009 (aged 81) Beijing, People's Republic of China
- Party: Chinese Communist Party (1945-2009)

Chinese name
- Traditional Chinese: 蔡誠
- Simplified Chinese: 蔡诚
Transcriptions
Standard Mandarin
- Hanyu Pinyin: Cài Chéng
Yue: Cantonese
- Jyutping: Coi^{3} Sing^{4}
Southern Min
- Teochew Peng'im: Cua^{3} Sêng^{5}

Birth name
- Traditional Chinese: 伍毅鴻
- Simplified Chinese: 伍毅鸿
Transcriptions
Standard Mandarin
- Hanyu Pinyin: Wǔ Yìhóng
Yue: Cantonese
- Jyutping: Ng^{5} Ngai^{6}-hung^{4}
Southern Min
- Teochew Peng'im: Ngou^{2} Ngi^{5}-hong^{5}

Cai Cheng (simplified Chinese: 蔡诚; traditional Chinese: 蔡誠; pinyin: Cài Chéng (November 1927 – September 2, 2009), was a politician of the People's Republic of China, born in Puning, Jieyang, Guangdong. His birth name was Wu Yihong. (Chinese: 伍毅鸿)

== Biography ==
He was the minister of Justice from 1988 to 1993.

Cai Cheng was the 13th CPC Central Committee member from 1987 to 1992.

Cai's son, Cai Xiaohong, was a Lieutenant Colonel in the People's Liberation Army, working in Jiefang Daily as an editor. Xiaohong worked for the Liaison Office of the Central People's Government in Hong Kong and its predecessor since the late 1990s and was promoted to Secretary-General of the Liaison Office in 2001. During this period, he was caught leaking important confidential information to British intelligence agencies for millions of Hong Kong dollars. This led to Xiaohong receiving a 15-year jail sentence.

Government offices
| Preceded by Zou Yu | Minister of Justice; 1988–1993 | Succeeded by Xiao Yang |
