= Shen Deyong =

Chinese politician and grand justice

- 沈德咏

Chairperson of the Committee for Social and Legal Affairs
- In office 16 March 2018 – 20 March 2022
- Chairman: Wang Yang
- Preceded by: Meng Xuenong
- Succeeded by: Xu Lingyi

Executive Vice-President of the Supreme People's Court
- In office April 2008 – June 2018
- Preceded by: Cao Jianming
- Succeeded by: He Rong

Secretary of Shanghai Discipline Inspection Committee of the Chinese Communist Party
- In office November 2006 – April 2008
- Preceded by: Luo Shiqian
- Succeeded by: Dong Junshu

Personal details
- Born: March 12, 1954 (age 72) Xiushui County, Jiangxi, China
- Party: Chinese Communist Party (expelled)
- Education: Jiangxi Normal University; China University of Political Science and Law; Central Party School of the Chinese Communist Party

Chinese name
- Traditional Chinese: 沈德詠
- Simplified Chinese: 沈德咏
Transcriptions
Standard Mandarin
- Hanyu Pinyin: Shěn Déyǒng

Shen Deyong (Chinese: 沈德咏; born March 12, 1954) is a Chinese politician and judge who served as the chairperson of the Committee for Social and Legal Affairs (CPPCC). At the height of his political career, he served as executive vice-president of the Supreme People's Court, the highest level of China's judiciary. Shen formally resigned from the government in June 2018, which was a shock to the news media.

He began work in December 1977 and joined the Chinese Communist Party (CCP) in May 1972. Shen was a member of the 18th and 19th CCP Central Committee. He was a delegate to the 19th National Congress of the Chinese Communist Party. He was also a member of the 16th and 17th Central Commission for Discipline Inspection of the Chinese Communist Party. He is a member of the 13th Standing Committee of the CPPCC.

== Biography ==
Shen was born in Xiushui County, Jiangxi in March 1954. After high school in 1975, he studied, then taught, at what is now Jiangxi Normal University, where he majored in English. In September 1980, he was accepted to China University of Political Science and Law.

After graduating in 1983, Shen was assigned to Nanchang, capital of Jiangxi province, as an official in the Provincial Commission of Politics and Law. In September 1988 he was transferred to Jiangxi Higher People's Court, where he was vice-president between 1993 and 1997. He became the deputy secretary of Jiangxi Provincial Discipline Inspection Committee of the Chinese Communist Party in February 1997, and served until October 1998.

In October 1998, Shen was transferred to Beijing and he was promoted to become vice-president of the Supreme People's Court, the highest level of court in China. He was secretary of Shanghai Municipal Discipline Inspection Committee of the Chinese Communist Party in November 2006, and held that office until April 2008. Then he was promoted again to become executive vice-president of the Supreme People's Court, a position at ministerial level. He became chairperson of the Committee for Social and Legal Affairs (CPPCC) in March 2018, serving in the post until his formally resignation from office in June 2018. On June 22, 2018, he published a farewell article on the internet and teased himself as an old cadre.

=== Downfall ===
On March 21, 2022, Shen has been placed under investigation for "serious violations of discipline and laws" by the Central Commission for Discipline Inspection (CCDI), the CCP's internal disciplinary body, and the National Supervisory Commission, the highest anti-corruption agency of China. On September 7, he was expelled from the CCP. On September 28, he was arrested by the Supreme People's Procuratorate for suspected bribe taking. On December 27, he was indicted on suspicion of accepting bribes.

On 11 May 2023, Shen stood trial at the Intermediate People's Court of Ningbo on charges of taking bribes over 64.56 million yuan. On August 4, he was eventually sentenced to a 15-year jail and fined 6 million yuan for taking bribes.

Party political offices
Preceded by Luo Shiqian (罗世谦)	Secretary of Shanghai Municipal Discipline Inspection Committee of the Chinese Communist Party; 2006–2008	Succeeded by Dong Junshu
Legal offices
Preceded by Cao Jianming	Executive Vice-President of the Supreme People's Court; 2008–2018	Succeeded by He Rong
Assembly seats
Preceded by Meng Xuenong	Chairperson of the Committee for Social and Legal Affairs; 2018–2022	Succeeded by Xu Lingyi
