= Seven Bottom Lines =

Chinese Communist Party slogan

- Simplified Chinese: 七条底线
Transcriptions

The Seven Bottom Lines is a Chinese government political slogan first proposed by Lu Wei, deputy head of the Publicity Department of the Chinese Communist Party and director of the State Internet Information Office, at the China Internet Conference on 15 August 2013. They serve as the bottom lines that internet users and social media companies in China must adhere to, with content violating them being forbidden.

== Background ==
In January 2013, the Chinese government started holding celebrities such as Ren Zhiqiang and Yi Nengjing for "invitation to tea". On 9 January 2013, Google China former president Kai-fu Lee posted on Weibo saying "This tea is hard to swallow!" and added "From now on, [I will] only discuss East, West, and North, and only discuss Monday through Friday". In July 2013, famous female singer Wu Hongfei was punished with 10 days of administrative detention for writing "I want to bomb the Construction Committee" on Weibo.

== History ==
On 10 August 2013, Lu Wei, director of the State Internet Information Office, convened a meeting with Weibo and internet celebrities to discuss six hopes for the social responsibility of internet celebrities. He also reached a consensus with the internet celebrities present on adhering to the Seven Bottom Lines. At the same time, Lu Wei hoped that celebrities would assume social responsibility, act as positive energy, and contribute to the realization of the Chinese Dream. The internet celebrities who attended the meeting that day included Ji Lianhai, Liao Hong, Chen Li, Pan Shiyi, Victor Koo, Chen Tong, Zhou Xiaoping, Charles Xue, Xu Shiping, Qi Xiangdong, Sun Jian, Hu Yanping, Zhang Guoqing, Gao Long, Xu Xiaoping, and Li Weining.

== Description ==
The Seven Bottom Lines are:

1. Laws and regulations
2. The socialist system
3. The national interest
4. Citizens' legal rights and interests
5. Social order
6. Moral norms
7. Factual information

On 13 August 2013, a government-run website in Sichuan published an article titled the "The Seven Bottom Lines That Every Internet User Should Observe", which placed "the nation" and "national interest" as the top consideration, saying China should "forge a patriotic online culture". Regarding the socialist system, it said "This is our fundamental institution, a bottom line we cannot neglect. Whether in real life on the internet, we eat and live socialism. We cannot undermine ourselves".

== Implementation ==
On 20 August 2013, the public security organs of China launched the Special Campaign to Combat and Rectify Cybercrime. Qin Huohuo and others were arrested for spreading rumors online. By September 2013, a special section at the People's Daily Online was created to aggregate articles and reports regarding the phrase. On 13 November 2013, the Beijing Youth Daily reported that at least 100,000 Weibo accounts had been "handled" in accordance with the policy. On 7 August 2014, the State Internet Information Office published the Interim Rules on the Development and Administration of Instant Messaging Tools and Public Information Services, which covered anyone "employing instant messaging tools as public information services" including "public accounts". It mandates that companies require their users to enter into terms of service whereby each user needs to commit to abide by the Seven Bottom Lines, which led to companies like Tencent implementing the policy.
