= Huang Ermei =

Chinese judge ( born 1951)

Huang Ermei (Chinese: 黃爾梅; born December 1951) is a Chinese politician from Zhongshan, Guangdong. She graduated from Peking University Law School with a Bachelor in Laws specialising in criminal law. She once served as the vice-president of the Supreme People's Court, a member of the Adjudication Committee of the Supreme People's Court, a Justice of the Second Rank, and a member of the 12th National Committee of the Chinese People's Political Consultative Conference. Huang is the second female vice-president of the Supreme People's Court in its history.

== Life ==
Huang Ermei joined the Chinese Communist Party in June 1976. After more than 10 years of living in rural areas, military camps, and factories, Huang was admitted into Peking University Law School. In 1983, Huang graduated with a bachelor's degree and was assigned to work in the Supreme People's Court. Huang later returned to Peking University to pursue a part-time postgraduate degree and worked in the court system ever since, once serving as executive vice president of the Beijing High People's Court.

In 2000, Huang Ermei returned to the Supreme People's Court, serving as the deputy chief judge of the Judicial Supervision Division, chief judge of the Case-Filing Division, a member of the Adjudication Committee, chief judge of the First Criminal Division, and a Standing Member of the Adjudication Committee. In February 2007, Huang was appointed as a Justice of the Second Rank. On 29 October, 2011, in the 23rd meeting of the Standing Committee of the 11th National People's Congress, Huang was appointed as the vice-president of the Supreme People's Court, becoming the second female vice-president after Ma Yuan. In December 2015, in the 18 Standing Committee of the 12th National People's Congress voted to remove Huang of her duties as vice-president of the Supreme People's Court, a member of the Adjudication Committee, and judge.

Legal offices
Previous: Nan Ying	Chief judge of the First Criminal Division of the Supreme People's Court; October 2004-August 2009	Succeeded by Zhou Feng
