= Xiao Yang =

Xiao Yang or Yang Xiao may refer to:

== People surnamed Xiao ==
- Xiao Yang (governor) (1929–1998), Chinese politician, governor of Sichuan
- Xiao Yang (judge) (1939–2019), President of the Supreme Court of China
- Yang Xiao (scientist) (born c. 1967), Chinese-born computer scientist at the University of Alabama
- Xiao Yang (director) (born 1980), Chinese actor-director, a member of the duo Chopstick Brothers
- Sonny Xiao or Xiao Yang, vice-president of Nenking Group

== People surnamed Yang ==
- Yang Xiao (rower) (born 1964), Chinese rower
- Yang Xiao (Jin Yong character), a character from The Heaven Sword and Dragon Saber
