= Zhang Shiping (born 1954) =

Chinese politician (born 1954)

- 张世平

Vice chairperson of the Committee for Social and Legal Affairs of the Chinese People's Political Consultative Conference
- In office February 2014 – March 2018

Vice Chairwoman of the All-China Federation of Trade Unions
- In office January 2011 – October 2013

Vice Chairwoman of the All-China Women's Federation
- In office November 2011 – October 2013

Personal details
- Born: September 1954 (age 72) Beijing, China
- Party: Chinese Communist Party (1973-2026, expelled)
- Education: Beijing Normal University; Central Party School; Peking University

Zhang Shiping (Chinese: 张世平; born September 1954) is a former Chinese female politician, who served as the vice chairwoman of the All-China Federation of Trade Unions and the vice chairwoman of the All-China Women's Federation from 2008 to 2013.

== Career ==
Zhang was born in Beijing in September 1954. In July 1970, she enrolled to Xicheng District Automobile Depot and served as a repairwoman, material worker and an official of the political work group. She joined the Chinese Communist Party in May 1973. In 1973, she served as the member and deputy secretary of the Communist Youth League Committee of Xicheng District Transportation Bureau. In 1974, she served as the standing member of the Party Committee of Xicheng District Transportation Bureau, the deputy secretary of the Party Branch and the deputy director of the Revolutionary Committee of the Second Automobile Depot. In 1977, she served as the official of Xicheng District Party Committee Office and Industry and Transportation Group.

In 1979, Zhang was transferred to the All-China Women's Federation, and served as the official of the Secretariat Office, Cadre Education Division of the Publicity Department, the deputy director and director of the Education Division. She also studied in Beijing Normal University night school from 1980 to 1985, and in the Central Party School from 1992 to 1993.

In 1996, Zhang was served as the deputy director of the Publicity Department and the director of the Social and Cultural Division of the ACWF. She was served as the deputy director of the Urban and Rural Work Department in 1997, and promoted to the director in 1998. She also concurrently served as the director of the Women's Development Department. In 2002, she served as the director of the General Office.

In 2003, Zhang was served as the secretary of the Secretariat of the ACWF. She was served as the director of the Financial Review Committee of the All-China Federation of Trade Unions in 2008.

In January 2011, Zhang was elected as the vice chairwoman and the secretary of the Secretariat of the ACFTU. She also was elected as the vice chairwoman of the ACWF in November.

In February 2014, Zhang was appointed as the vice chairperson of the Committee for Social and Legal Affairs of the Chinese People's Political Consultative Conference. She was retired in 2018. After retiring, she was focused on population issue in China, especially population ageing.

== Investigation ==
On 30 December 2025, Zhang was put under investigation for alleged "serious violations of discipline and laws" by the Central Commission for Discipline Inspection (CCDI), the party's internal disciplinary body, and the National Supervisory Commission, the highest anti-corruption agency of China. Zhang was expelled from the party on 27 July 2026.
