= Fu Zhenghua =

Chinese politician

- 傅政华
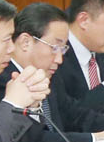
- Fu in 2016

Minister of Justice
- In office 19 March 2018 – 29 April 2020
- Premier: Li Keqiang
- Preceded by: Zhang Jun
- Succeeded by: Tang Yijun

Executive Vice Minister of Public Security
- In office August 2013 – March 2018
- Premier: Li Keqiang
- Minister: Guo Shengkun
- Preceded by: Yang Huanning
- Succeeded by: Wang Xiaohong

Director of Beijing Municipal Public Security Bureau
- In office February 2010 – August 2013
- Mayor: Guo Jinlong; Wang Anshun
- Preceded by: Ma Zhenchuan
- Succeeded by: Wang Xiaohong

Personal details
- Born: 13 March 1955 (age 71) Luan County, Hebei, China
- Party: Chinese Communist Party (1973–2022; expelled)
- Education: Peking University

Chinese name
- Simplified Chinese: 傅政华
- Traditional Chinese: 傅政華
Transcriptions
Standard Mandarin
- Hanyu Pinyin: Fù Zhènghuá

Fu Zhenghua (Chinese: 傅政华; born March 1955) is a former Chinese politician and public security officer. He was convicted of taking bribes and bending the law for personal gain in September 2022, and was sentenced to life imprisonment.

Previously, Fu served as deputy director of the Committee for Social and Legal Affairs of the CPPCC National Committee from 2020 to 2021, 11th Minister of Justice of China from 2018 to 2020, deputy party secretary and executive deputy minister of public security from 2015 to 2018, deputy minister of public security from 2013 to 2015, and director of Beijing Municipal Public Security Bureau from 2010 to 2013. From 2015 to 2018, Fu served concurrently as the head of the 610 Office.

== Early life and education ==
Fu was born in Luan County, Hebei. In March 1955, he graduated from Peking University.

== Career ==
Fu became involved in politics in December 1970, and he joined the Chinese Communist Party in September 1973.

He had a career in the Beijing police (Beijing Municipal Public Security Bureau) as an investigator. He took part in solving a number of high-profile cases, including the "1996 Beijing Cash Truck Robbery case", the "1997 Bai Baoshan case", the "attack on Mentougou police" case, and the "Huang Guangyu case".

In January 2010, he was promoted to become secretary of Beijing Municipal Public Security Bureau, a position he held until 2013.

In February 2010, he was appointed director of Beijing Municipal Public Security Bureau, essentially the chief of police of the Chinese capital; he remained in that position until August 2013, when he was appointed the deputy minister of Public Security.

In May 2010, Fu closed down the Tianshang Renjian Night Club (Chinese: 天上人间夜总会); his action was well received.

In the second half of 2013, Fu launched the Special Campaign Against Network Illegal Crimes, he arrested Charles Xue, Qin Huohuo and Fu Xuesheng (Chinese: 付学胜).

In February 2014, Chinese media reported that Fu launched the Cleaning the Web campaign. Since December 2014, Fu has been a member of the Central Political and Legal Affairs Commission. In September 2015, it was revealed during Yu Zhengsheng's trip to Xinjiang that Fu was named the head of the 610 Office, founded to oversee the suppression of Falun Gong.

In March 2018, Fu was appointed as the minister of Justice, and held the position for two years.

On May 19, 2020, he became a member of the Social and Legal Affairs Committee of the National Committee of the Chinese People's Political Consultative Conference.

== Downfall ==
The Central Commission for Discipline Inspection announced on October 2, 2021, that it was investigating him for "serious violations of discipline and national laws". On October 27, he was dismissed from public office and was removed from membership of China's top political advisory body, the Chinese People's Political Consultative Conference.

On March 31, 2022, he was expelled from the Chinese Communist Party and dismissed from public office. On April 21, he was arrested by the Supreme People's Procuratorate. On July 28, he stood trial at the Intermediate People's Court of Changchun on charges of bribe-taking and bending the law for personal gain. Prosecutors accused Fu of taking advantage of his official authority or position to seek gains for others regarding business operations, official positions and legal cases, in return for which he illegally accepted money and gifts worth 117 million yuan (about 17.36 million U.S. dollars) either by himself or through some of his close relatives. On September 22, he was handed a suspended death sentence that will be commuted to life imprisonment after two years, with no possibility of parole, for taking bribes and bending the law for personal gains. He was deprived of political rights for life and all his properties were also confiscated.

Government offices
Preceded by Ma Zhenchuan	Director of Beijing Municipal Public Security Bureau; 2010-2013	Succeeded by Wang Xiaohong
Preceded by Yang Huanning	Executive Deputy Minister of Public Security; 2013-2018	Succeeded by Wang Xiaohong
Preceded by Zhang Jun	Minister of Justice; 2018-2020	Succeeded by Tang Yijun
