= RedNote =

Chinese social media and e-commerce platform

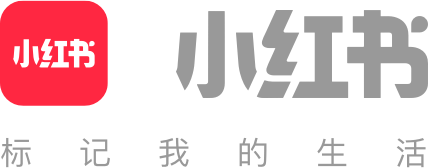

- "Explore" page on the international version of the RedNote Android app
- Developers: Xingyin Information Technology (Shanghai) Co., Ltd.
Stable release
- iOS/iPadOS: 9.28 / 24 April 2026; 6 months ago
- Android (via Tencent Appstore): 8.99.1 / 5 September 2025; 14 months ago
- Android (via Google Play): 9.26.0 / 15 April 2026; 7 months ago
- HarmonyOS NEXT: 8.88.1 / 19 June 2025; 17 months ago
- Operating system: iOS 12 and later; iPadOS 12 and later; Android; HarmonyOS NEXT
- Available in: Simplified Chinese, Traditional Chinese, English
- License: Proprietary
- Website: www.xiaohongshu.com

RedNote
- Simplified Chinese: 小红书
- Traditional Chinese: 小紅書
- Literal meaning: Little Red Book
Transcriptions
Standard Mandarin
- Hanyu Pinyin: Xiǎohóngshū
- Bopomofo: ㄒㄧㄠˇ ㄏㄨㄥˊ ㄕㄨ
- Gwoyeu Romatzyh: Sheauhorngshu
- Wade–Giles: Hsiao^{3}-hung^{2}-shu^{1}
- Yale Romanization: Syǎu-húng-shū
- IPA: [ɕjàʊxʊ̌ŋʂú]
Wu
- Romanization: Xiau5 ghon6 sy1
Yue: Cantonese
- Jyutping: Siu2 hung4 syu1
other Yue
- Taishanese: Siu4 hung4 si1
Southern Min
- Hokkien POJ: Sio4 ang5 zu1
- Teochew Peng'im: Sio5 ang5 ze1

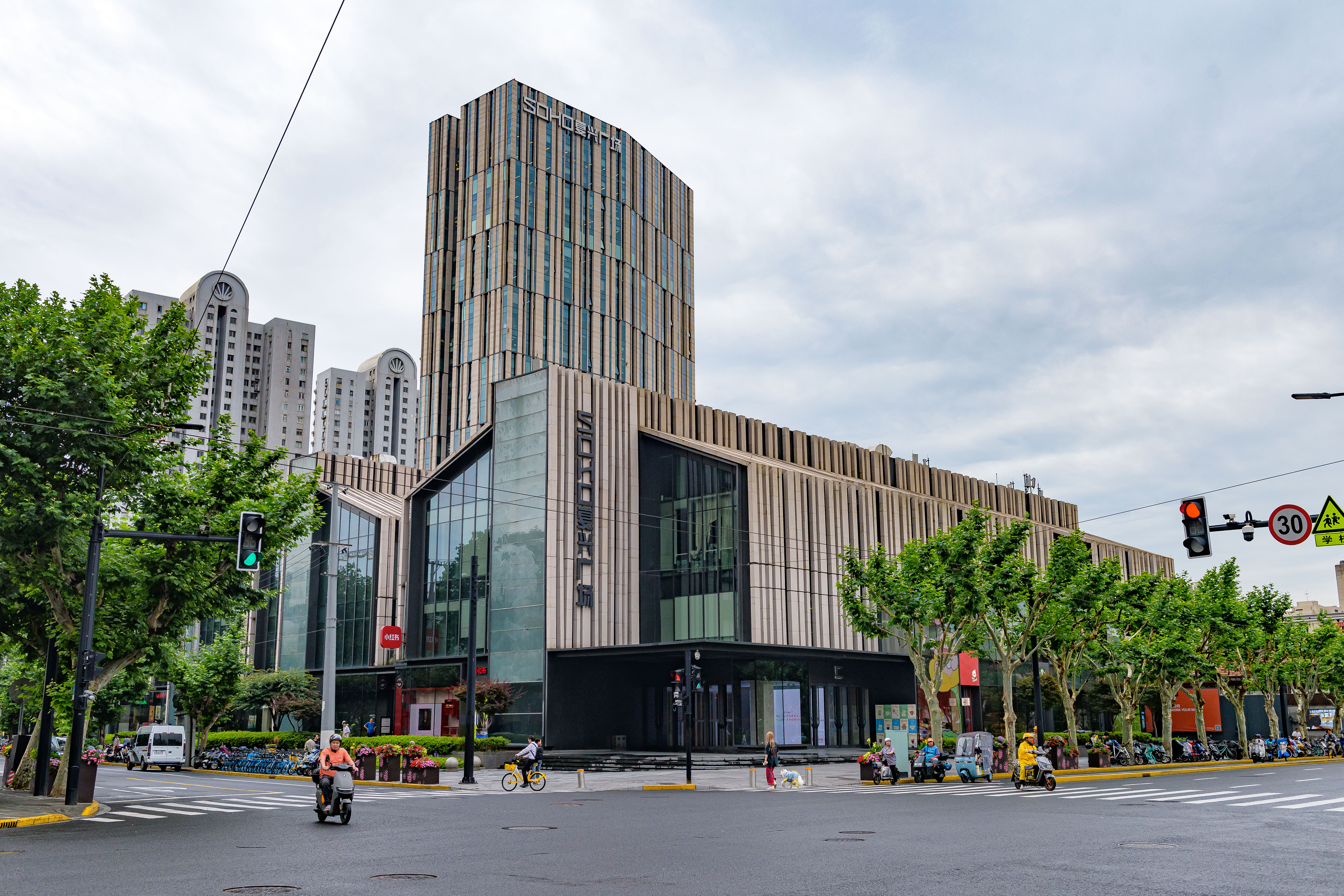
RedNote headquarters at SOHO Fuxing Plaza, Shanghai

RedNote (XHS or Xiaohongshu; Chinese: 小红书; pinyin: Xiǎohóngshū; lit. 'little red book') is a Chinese social networking and e-commerce platform. It is known for combining user-generated "notes" (posts mixing text, images, and short videos) with product discovery and social commerce features.

As of 2020, 70% of the platform's users are reportedly born after 1990, and nearly 70% of them are female. The South China Morning Post described RedNote as "China's answer to Instagram". In January 2025, the app briefly gained an influx of new users labelled as "TikTok refugees" from the United States and other parts of the world due to the anticipated shutdown of TikTok's U.S. operations, though the app's popularity overseas quickly faded soon after that. RedNote subsequently implemented measures to separate Chinese users from non-Chinese users on the platform.

Like all other social media apps in China, RedNote operates under the strict content moderation requirements from the Cyberspace Administration of China, with content criticizing the Chinese Communist Party (CCP) or CCP general secretary Xi Jinping being forbidden.

== Etymology ==
The app was initially called "Hong Kong Shopping Guide" and targeted Chinese tourists. According to co-founder Mao Wenchao, the name Xiaohongshu (lit. 'little red book') was inspired by his career at Bain & Company and education at the Stanford Graduate School of Business; both institutions feature red as their main color. "Little Red Book" is also the English nickname for the 1964 Quotations from Chairman Mao Tse-tung, known during the Cultural Revolution as 红宝书 (pinyin: Hóngbǎoshū; lit. 'Red Treasured Book'). The company has stated that the platform's name is not a reference to the compilation book.

Internationally, the app was branded as RED from 2022 through 2023, then listed under the name REDnote on the Google Play store beginning in September 2024. The latter name is often used by many US users. Since January 20, 2025, the app has been styled rednote on both the App Store and Google Play.

== History ==
RedNote was founded by Miranda Qu and Charlwin Mao in 2013 as an online tour guide for Chinese shoppers, providing a platform for users to review products and share their shopping experiences with the community. In 2015, RedNote set up its warehouses in Shenzhen, Guangdong and Zhengzhou, Henan.

On 6 June 2017, RedNote held a shopping festival to celebrate its fourth anniversary, which saw the sales revenue exceed CN¥100 million in two hours, while the app ranked in first place in the iOS App Store under the "Shopping" category that day.

In June 2018, the Alibaba Group and Tencent invested US$300 million in RedNote , with a valuation of US$3 billion.

Due to the platform's early focus on fashion and beauty trends, RedNote's user base was predominantly female in its early years. 90% of RedNote users were women, according to a report published in April 2021. The app had attracted affluent Gen Z female users in urban China as an alternative to Instagram, which is blocked in the country. RedNote subsequently adjusted its corporate strategy to attract more male users to maintain its growth. In 2021, it announced that the platform would promote male user content. By 2022, 30% of RedNote users were male. There was criticism that the strategy, as well as RedNote's algorithm, increased harassment on the platform and made women feel less welcome. An external advertising agency marketed RedNote on other websites as a place to see "Beautiful ladies... without spending any money!" and "Sexy, beautiful car models and stylish beauties", which the company later apologized for.

In 2021, RedNote applied for an initial public offering in the United States. However, it decided to transfer the IPO from the United States to Hong Kong in the same year. According to a Bloomberg News report in July, this included requiring all companies holding the data of more than 1 million users to submit a cyber security review, which was one of the reasons for the suspension of RedNote's listing in the United States. Reuters reported that the US IPO was cancelled after Chinese regulators voiced concern over the listing venue.

In 2023, Sequoia China bought the RedNote shares in multiple transactions at a valuation of $14 billion.

On 18 April 2019, the Chinese Communist Party (CCP) Branch of Xingyin Information Technology (Shanghai) Co., Ltd. (Xiaohongshu) was established in Shanghai. On 15 May 2024, the Xiaohongshu (Beijing) Branch Committee of the CCP was established.

According to the Financial Times, RedNote completed a round of stake sales of existing shares to new and former investors around July 2024 that valued the company at around $17 billion. This round saw participation from prominent venture capital investors, including DST Global, HongShan (formerly Sequoia China), Hillhouse Investment, Boyu Capital, and CITIC Capital. The platform, which already has significant backing from Chinese tech giants Tencent and Alibaba, achieved profitability in 2023 with a net profit of $500 million on revenues of $3.7 billion. Despite having a large user base of over 300 million monthly active users with high engagement, its total revenue remains significantly lower than Douyin's.

In January 2025, amid uncertainty over the future of TikTok in the United States, a noticeable number of U.S. users began migrating to RedNote as an alternative platform. Reuters reported that the influx reached over 700,000 new users in roughly two days, alongside a sharp rise in U.S. downloads and visibility on app download charts. Commentators described the episode as cross-platform migration influenced by regulatory uncertainty and platform governance. American users described the move to RedNote both as a way to preserve a TikTok-like community and as a kind of protest against U.S. government pressure on TikTok. It also gave Chinese users a chance to interact with a large number of English speakers. With state broadcaster China Central Television (CCTV) supporting the influx, most Chinese citizens warmly welcomed U.S. users, while some Chinese nationalist bloggers warned against American influence. NYU Shanghai professors Anna Greenspan and Bogna Konior cite the influx of "TikTok refugees" to RedNote as an example of how "West[ern] fears, scepticism, and punitive approach ... has paradoxically helped to enable the development of a distinct and competitive Chinese media environment." In March 2026, RedNote implemented measures to separate Chinese users from non-Chinese users on the platform. RedNote's popularity in overseas quickly faded soon after January 2025, with most foreign accounts that joined having stopped posting after that time.

On 11 September 2025, the Cyberspace Administration of China ordered "warnings and strict punishment" to RedNote over content, warning "Responsible individuals" failed to "fulfil its main responsibility of content management" and that RedNote had "numerous posts hyping celebrities’ personal dynamics and trivial matters and other negative content frequently populating the hot search list". RedNote replied by saying "We sincerely accept this, (and will) profoundly learn lessons", stating it launched a "special rectification working group" to improve its search results.

In February 2025, Bloomberg News reported that the China Securities Regulatory Commission told RedNote that bringing a state-owned investor would make negotiations for approving an initial public offering easier. In June 2026, it was reported that RedNote was preparing confidentially file for an initial public offering in Hong Kong. The Wall Street Journal reported the state-owned China International Capital Corporation would be among the investors.

== Features ==
=== Grass-planting ===
Users can share, search and bookmark product reviews and introductions to travel destinations, known as grass-planting (Chinese: 种草, slang for "sharing and recommending a product") notes, while selling and purchasing goods. By sharing their product experiences, while influencers and users encourage others to make purchases based on their recommendations, they spread information on the platform and help users with various needs to find what they need or plan for. Research on RedNote has linked note-sharing and perceived authenticity to users' purchase intentions.

=== Search ===
As RedNote focuses on lifestyle topics, the ecosystem has given it a growing advantage in competition with traditional Chinese search engines, making it a new generation search engine and earning it the reputation of "National Lifestyle Guide". Search and recommendation features play a central role in how users discover content on the platform. In 2025, RedNote introduced Diandian, an AI-powered search tool aimed at improving content discovery. RedNote recorded almost 600 million daily search queries in Q4 2024, reportedly half that of Baidu and doubled over the past year.

=== Shopping ===
Upon its launch, RedNote's initial focus was to provide overseas shopping advice to people through digital community interaction. Later, RedNote launched the function of posting shopping notes in the community to provide customers with more timely shopping information. RedNote provides international logistics services to third-party merchants. The Financial Times reported that RedNote's quarterly sales exceeded US$1 billion in the first quarter of 2024.

=== Business model ===
RedNote generates revenue primarily through advertising and marketing services, particularly from consumer brands such as cosmetics and lifestyle products. The platform combines user-generated content with product discovery and social commerce features. Reports have noted that users often purchase recommended products on other marketplaces such as Taobao and Tmall, which can limit RedNote's direct e-commerce conversion.

In addition to advertising, RedNote has been described as relying on influencer-driven content and brand partnerships as part of its broader social commerce approach. During periods of increased international attention, media coverage has highlighted the platform's efforts to expand its content moderation capacity, including recruitment for English-language moderation.

== Content moderation and censorship ==
Like all social media platforms in China, RedNote operates under the strict content moderation requirements from the Cyberspace Administration of China. RedNote terms of service state that content that "violate[s], incite[s] resistance or undermine[s] the implementation of the Constitution of the People's Republic of China", "endanger[s] the national unity, the integrity of the sovereignty and territory of the People's Republic of China", "leak[s] state secrets", "damage[s] the national dignity, honor, and interests of the People's Republic of China", "defam[es] the excellent Chinese cultural traditions" or incites ethnic or religious conflict, "endanger[s] social morality", "disrupt[s] social order" or "undermin[es] social stability" of the People's Republic of China, promotes obscenity, gambling or drug abuse, or violates the Seven Bottom Lines is forbidden. Additionally, content criticizing the Chinese Communist Party or CCP general secretary Xi Jinping is strictly forbidden. Only state news organizations can obtain licences to publish original news content. Harmless, non-sensitive and non-political content face less censorship.

RedNote strictly prevents advertising and linking to external websites or apps. Actions such as sending WeChat contacts in posts or DMs or inquiring about prices of goods can lead to account suspension.

In 2022, China Digital Times published leaked documents showing how RedNote's content moderation teams censor or limit posts about topics sensitive to the Chinese Communist Party (CCP), including mentions of derogatory nicknames for Xi Jinping, and discussion of events such as labor strikes, geographic discrimination, student suicides and criticism of the CCP. Users noted that topics such as the 1989 Tiananmen Square protests and massacre or Free Hong Kong are censored on the platform.

Following the growth in users from the United States, RedNote was said to be exploring adjustments to its content review processes as American influencers began sharing posts. According to Wired and The Beijing News, RedNote announced an urgent recruitment of English content moderators to expand its content moderation team. On 14 January 2025, RedNote announced that it would direct users to more "positive" content in line with a November 2024 directive from the Cyberspace Administration of China. That same month, when asked about the platform's censorship in a press briefing, China's foreign ministry spokesperson Guo Jiakun replied that "no matter what platforms you use, it's a personal choice" further adding that the Chinese government encourages and supports "person-to-person exchanges". The Wall Street Journal reported that officials have instructed RedNote to make it less likely for Chinese users to see politically sensitive posts from overseas users, according to "people familiar" with the matter. Most Americans on RedNote did not touch on such taboos, although some accounts were flagged or suspended for reasons such as wearing revealing clothes.

== Reception ==
In October 2021, RedNote received criticism for condoning heavily filtered, stylized photographs and perfectly captured imagery that was becoming increasingly common on the platform's feeds. On 17 October 2021, the platform issued a statement on WeChat to acknowledge that there was a problem of travel influencers posting "overly beautified" photos of scenic spots. According to the statement, RedNote issued an apology and indicated that because "bloggers did not clearly label their works as creative photography, people interpreted them as part of travel guides. Users who visited the locations were disappointed by the differences between their expectations and reality".

In December 2021, in response to loss of public trust towards the authenticity of content hosted on its platform, RedNote formed a dedicated team to identify and remove fraudulent content. A system that uses algorithms and human checks to block falsified content was also implemented. Since then, the platform has banned 81 brands and merchants, deleted 172,600 fake reviews, and disabled 53,600 accounts, according to the company.

On 19 January 2022, an announcement was made by RedNote indicating that the company had filed a lawsuit against four companies behind several ghostwriting broker sites in an attempt to restore consumer trust. In an official statement made by RedNote, the company alleged that the four companies had set up marketplaces for merchants and gig writers to carry out fraudulent practices, including the production of fake reviews and click farming. RedNote asked for US$1.57 million in compensation for damage to its reputation and the infringement of consumer rights on its platform.

On 25 January 2022, reports emerged that RedNote has received a fine totaling ¥300,000 from local authorities in Shanghai for failing to remove content that was deemed harmful to minors. The fine relates to a violation of cybersecurity law that guarantees protection for minors after an earlier media report was made by state broadcaster CCTV in December 2021, that it found videos posted on RedNote showing underage girls in various states of undress, featured in advertisements for underwear brands.

In January 2025, Texas governor Greg Abbott prohibited the app on all government devices. In September 2025, the Cyberspace Administration of China announced that it had directed the Shanghai Cyberspace Administration to penalize RedNote, which was accused of frequently featuring "negative content" on its top search lists, such as sensationalizing the personal lives of celebrities.

In March 2026, RedNote was removed from the Google Play and Apple App Store in India, following allegations in 2025 by Indian intelligence agencies that the app was being used to spread anti-India propaganda and disinformation targeting users in northeastern India, prompting the Government of India to consider banning the app on national security grounds.

=== In Taiwan ===
In December 2022, the government of Taiwan banned public sector employees from using RedNote on official devices due to national security concerns. Taiwan's Mainland Affairs Council referred to the app as a vector for united front propaganda. By 2025, RedNote had 3 million users in Taiwan, accounting for one seventh of its population.

In November 2025, Taiwan's Ministry of Education has warned against the harmful impact of RedNote and related app TikTok on body image and ensuing self harm related to weight loss especially in teenagers. Civil society groups warn that these apps push users down "rabbit holes" and then surround them in an "information cocoon". In December 2025, the Taiwanese government announced a one-year suspension of access to the app in the country, citing fraud concerns. The Criminal Investigation Bureau claimed the app poses risks to users' personal data and was involved in 1,706 fraud cases since 2024. The move was criticized by many, including the opposition Kuomintang, as government censorship that would damage Taiwan's reputation for internet freedom. It additionally prompted some Taiwanese users to download virtual private networks to bypass the ban.

== See also ==
- Bilibili
- Zhihu
