= 2023 Cathay Pacific discrimination scandal =

2023 scandal

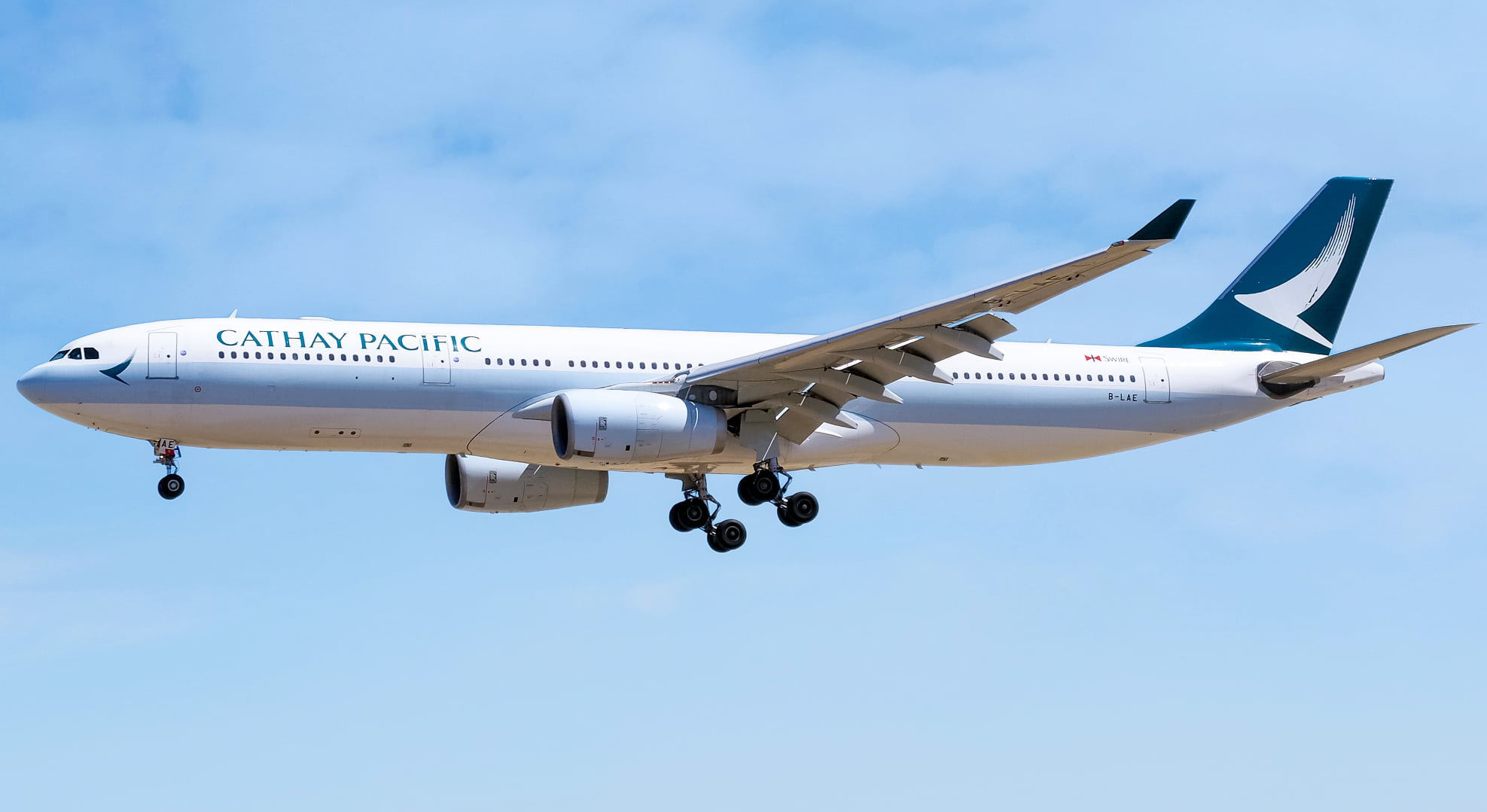
- B-LAE, the Airbus A330-300 aircraft involved in the scandal
- Date: 21 May 2023
- Location: China Hong Kong

The Cathay Pacific discrimination scandal (also known ironically as the Carpet Pacific Discrimination Scandal) refers to a series of alleged discrimination incidents by the flight attendants against multiple passengers aboard Cathay Pacific Flight 987, flying from Chengdu Tianfu International Airport to Hong Kong International Airport on 21 May 2023.

== Timeline ==
On 23 May 2023, an audio recording was posted to the internet in which Cathay Pacific flight attendants could allegedly be heard making fun of a passenger based on their lack of English proficiency. Later that day, after being criticized by Chinese media and tens of thousands of netizens, Cathay Pacific apologised on Chinese social media sites for their flight attendants’ discriminatory actions against non-English speakers, by saying that the airlines has "suspended the flight attendants concerned and launched an internal investigation", where any "inappropriate words and deeds" that violated its rules and professional ethics would be dealt with seriously once confirmed. The company emphasized the importance of the incident and promised to conduct a serious investigation. They reiterated their commitment to providing high-quality service to their passengers.

However, many mainland netizens considered it to be 'insincere' and 'painless' because the statement was not stamped. Some even changed Cathay Pacific's English name to 'Carpet Pacific' as a form of ridicule.

As for public reaction, many mainland Chinese netizens were not convinced by Cathay's apology. Some questioned why the apology was posted from Beijing instead of Hong Kong. Others criticised Cathay for only posting the apology in simplified Chinese on Weibo, and demanded Cathay to publish a global apology in both Chinese and English on their official website, Facebook, and Instagram.

On the 23rd, the poster of the original Xiaohongshu post stated that the director of customer service at Cathay Pacific's headquarters had contacted her to further understand the situation. She insisted that her intention was to ensure an apology from the flight attendants for their discriminatory remarks and for Cathay Pacific to apologize to any passengers who had an unpleasant experience. She stated she would not delete her posts until the flight attendants apologized.

In the afternoon, under the pressure of public opinion, Cathay Pacific issued a statement on Weibo again, 'formally apologizing' for the incident. The statement stated that the crew members involved in the incident had been suspended, an internal investigation was underway, and the results would be made public within three days.

Due to the rising discontentment, Cathay Pacific apologised for the third time, saying that the airlines dismissed the three flight attendants who made inappropriate acts against non-English speaking passengers. CEO Ronald Lam apologized on behalf of the airlines and promised that he himself will lead a cross-departmental working group to conduct a comprehensive review and re-examination of the airline's service process, personnel training and related systems to avoid similar incidents from happening again.

On the afternoon of the 23rd, a user posted personal attacks towards the poster of the original complaint post in Cantonese on Xiaohongshu, calling the incident as "a small matter that reveals the fragility of many." The user cussed the whistleblower for "shamelessly recording audio," and pointed out that "one of the recorded flight attendants was not from Hong Kong and that English was not her mother tongue", asking "why do you guys demand her to use Mandarin". In stark contrast to the Cathay Pacific's official apology statement, the post raised doubts among netizens about Cathay Pacific's sincerity in handling the incident.

The whistleblower later posted a thread on Xiaohongshu in response to the insults, stating that she "never mentioned the nationality of the flight attendants or crew in the original thread". However, the cussing post stated the nationality and mother tongue of them. Therefore, the whistleblower suggested that the user who posted the insulting thread "is very likely to be" one of the involved flight attendants and criticized the user for still not realizing the discriminatory elements in the recording and the malicious intention expressed.

== Reactions ==
On 24 May 2023, when being asked of the incident, Hong Kong chief executive John Lee said the incident had "hurt the feelings of compatriots in Hong Kong and the mainland". And at this time, CEO Ronald Lam apologized again, but in Mandarin, by saying that he will personally lead a taskforce to conduct a review into the company's code of conduct.
