= Minister of Justice (China) =

Minister of the People's Republic of China

Minister of Justice of the People's Republic of China
- 中华人民共和国司法部部长
- Logo of the Justice Administrative Organs of China

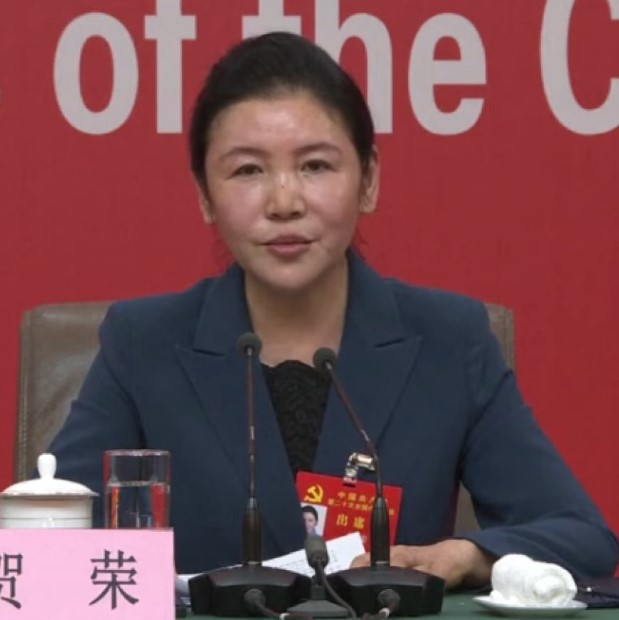
- Incumbent; He Rong since 24 February 2023
- Ministry of Justice
- Status: Provincial and ministerial-level official
- Member of: Plenary Meeting of the State Council
- Seat: Ministry of Justice Building, Xicheng District, Beijing
- Nominator: Premier (chosen within the Chinese Communist Party)
- Appointer: President with the confirmation of the National People's Congress or its Standing Committee
- Precursor: Minister of Justice of the Republic of China
- Formation: 19 October 1949; 76 years ago
- First holder: Shi Liang
- Deputy: Vice Minister of Finance
- Website: www.moj.gov.cn/jgsz/jgszbldjs/

The minister of justice of the People's Republic of China is the head of the Ministry of Justice of the People's Republic of China and a member of the State Council. Within the State Council, the position is eleventh in order of precedence. The minister is responsible for leading the ministry, presiding over its meetings, and signing important documents related to the ministry. Officially, the minister is nominated by the premier of the State Council, who is then approved by the National People's Congress or its Standing Committee and appointed by the president.

The current minister is He Rong, the third woman to serve in the post.

== History ==
The Ministry of Justice of the Central People's Government was established on 1 October 1949, and Shi Liang was appointed as minister of Justice on 19 October. In September 1954, the ministry was reorganized to the Ministry of Justice of the PRC; the office was also renamed. On 28 April 1959, the Ministry of Justice was abolished, and its functions transferred to the Supreme People's Court. On 13 September 1979, the Ministry of Justice was re-established.

== List of ministers ==
No.	Portrait	Name (Birth–Death)	Term of office			Important offices held during tenure	Premier	Ref.
No.	Portrait	Name (Birth–Death)	Took office	Left office	Term	Important offices held during tenure	Premier	Ref.
Minister of Justice of the Central People's Government (19 October 1949 – 28 September 1954)
1		Shi Liang 史良 (1900–1985)	19 October 1949	28 September 1954	4 years, 344 days	Vice Chairwoman of the All-China Women's Federation; Member of the Standing Committee of the CPPCC National Committee; Vice Chairwoman of the China Democratic League	Zhou Enlai	
Minister of Justice of the People's Republic of China (28 September 1954 – 28 April 1959)
1		Shi Liang 史良 (1900–1985)	28 September 1954	28 April 1959	4 years, 212 days	Vice Chairwoman of the All-China Women's Federation; Member of the Standing Committee of the CPPCC National Committee; Vice Chairwoman of the China Democratic League	Zhou Enlai	
From 28 April 1959 to 13 September 1979, the post of Minister of Justice was abolished.
Minister of Justice of the People's Republic of China (13 September 1979 – present)
2		Wei Wenbo 魏文伯 (1905–1987)	13 September 1979	4 May 1982	2 years, 233 days	Secretary of the Party Leadership Group of the Ministry of Justice; Deputy Secretary of the Central Commission for Discipline Inspection; Member of the Central Advisory Commission	Hua Guofeng ↓ Zhao Ziyang	
3		Liu Fuzhi 刘复之 (1917–2013)	4 May 1982	20 June 1983	1 year, 47 days	Secretary of the Party Leadership Group of the Ministry of Justice; President of the China University of Political Science and Law; Secretary-General of the Central Political and Legal Affairs Commission	Zhao Ziyang	
4		Zou Yu 邹瑜 (born 1920)	20 June 1983	12 April 1988	4 years, 297 days	Secretary of the Party Leadership Group of the Ministry of Justice; President of the China University of Political Science and Law; President of the All China Lawyers Association	Zhao Ziyang ↓ Li Peng	
5		Cai Cheng 蔡诚 (1927–2009)	12 April 1988	29 March 1993	4 years, 351 days	Secretary of the Party Leadership Group of the Ministry of Justice	Li Peng	
6		Xiao Yang 肖扬 (1938–2019)	29 March 1993	19 March 1998	4 years, 355 days	Secretary of the Party Leadership Group of the Ministry of Justice; Deputy Procurator-General of the Supreme People's Procuratorate; Member of the Central Political and Legal Affairs Commission; Member of the Central Comprehensive Management of Public Security Committee	Li Peng	
7		Gao Changli 高昌礼 (born 1937)	19 March 1998	28 December 2000	2 years, 284 days	Secretary of the Party Leadership Group of the Ministry of Justice; Member of the Central Political and Legal Affairs Commission	Zhu Rongji	
8		Zhang Fusen 张福森 (born 1940)	28 December 2000	1 July 2005	4 years, 185 days	Secretary of the Party Leadership Group of the Ministry of Justice	Zhu Rongji ↓ Wen Jiabao	
9		Wu Aiying 吴爱英 (born 1951)	1 July 2005	24 February 2017	11 years, 238 days	Secretary of the Party Leadership Group of the Ministry of Justice	Wen Jiabao ↓ Li Keqiang	
10		Zhang Jun 张军 (born 1956)	24 February 2017	19 March 2018	1 year, 23 days	Secretary of the Party Leadership Group of the Ministry of Justice	Li Keqiang	
11		Fu Zhenghua 傅政华 (born 1955)	19 March 2018	29 April 2020	2 years, 41 days	Deputy Secretary of the Party Leadership Group of the Ministry of Justice	Li Keqiang	
12		Tang Yijun 唐一军 (born 1961)	29 April 2020	24 February 2023	2 years, 301 days		Li Keqiang	
13		He Rong 贺荣 (born 1962)	24 February 2023	Incumbent	3 years, 196 days	Secretary of the Party Leadership Group of the Ministry of Justice; Deputy Director of the Office of the Central Commission for the Central Comprehensive Law-Based Governance Commission	Li Keqiang ↓ Li Qiang	
