= Fifth Circuit Court of the Supreme People's Court =

Court in People's Republic of China

The Fifth Circuit Court of the Supreme People's Court of People's Republic of China was opened on December 29, 2016 in Chongqing. It acts in the same authority as the Supreme People's Court and has jurisdiction in Chongqing, Sichuan, Guizhou, Yunnan and Xizang.
