= Second Circuit Court of the Supreme People's Court =

Court in People's Republic of China

The Second Circuit Court of the Supreme People's Court of the People's Republic of China (中华人民共和国最高人民法院第二巡回法庭), is a circuit court created in December 2014 and opened on January 31, 2015, in Shenyang, China. It is one of the six circuit courts established by the Supreme People's Court. It has jurisdiction in the provinces of Liaoning, Jilin, and Heilongjiang.

Differing from a circuit court in a common law jurisdiction, the Second Circuit is part of a pilot program to establish circuit courts of the Supreme People's Court outside Beijing, the seat of the national government, with the same level of jurisdiction of the supreme court, i.e. cases decided by the circuit courts are deemed finally decided by the supreme court itself. The pilot program is carried out in an effort to avoid local influences.

The court decided its first case on March 10, 2015, ruling in favor of Lishan branch of Agricultural Bank of China in an economic dispute between the branch and Anshan City's power authority. The Court's chief judge is Junior Justice Hu Yunteng.

== See also ==
- Judicial system of China
