= Huang Songyou =

Huang Songyou (Chinese: 黄松有; pinyin: Huáng Sōngyǒu; born December 1957) was the vice-president of the Supreme People's Court of the People's Republic of China.

== Biography ==
Huang was born in Shantou, Guangdong in December 1957. He received his Bachelor of Laws degree from Southwest University of Political Science & Law in 1982.

After graduation, Huang worked as a judge in Guangdong High People's Court. He was elected as the President of Zhanjiang Intermediate People's Court in 1997.

Huang was appointed by the Standing Committee of the National People's Congress as the Head of the Civil Law Tribunal of the Supreme People's Court and member of its Judicial Committee on June 28, 1999. He was appointed by the Standing Committee of the National People's Congress as the Vice President of the Supreme People's Court on December 28, 2002.

On or about October 16, 2008, Huang was reportedly detained by Communist Party discipline officials in connection with a corruption scandal. He was removed from the office of the Supreme Court vice presidency on October 28, 2008.

In early 2010, he was sentenced to life imprisonment for receiving over 3.9 million RMB (about $570,000) in bribes while sitting as a Supreme People's Court judge, and for embezzling funds while serving as a judge in Guangdong.
