= Legal Daily =

Chinese Communist Party newspaper

Legal Daily (Chinese: 法制日报; pinyin: fǎzhì rìbào) is a People's Republic of China state-owned newspaper under the supervision of the Chinese Communist Party's Central Political and Legal Affairs Commission that is published in the PRC and primarily covers legal developments, such as important court rulings. Before 2001, Legal Daily was an organ of the Ministry of Justice of the People's Republic of China.

== Content ==
The newspaper, like most other similar papers in China, also produces two neican editions (internal reference editions); one version is often sent to officials nationwide to keep them up-to-date on legal developments, and a more-restricted version is distributed more selectively to individual government officials who may be related to the topic at hand. Neican editions are produced whenever deemed necessary.

Legal Daily generates revenue by publishing two market-oriented newspapers, one aimed at legal workers and the other for the general public, and a monthly magazine.
