= Ministry of Justice (China) =

Chinese government agency overseeing law-related matters

Ministry of Justice of the People's Republic of China
- 中华人民共和国司法部
- Emblem of the People's Republic of China

- Logo of the Justice Administrative Organs of the PRC

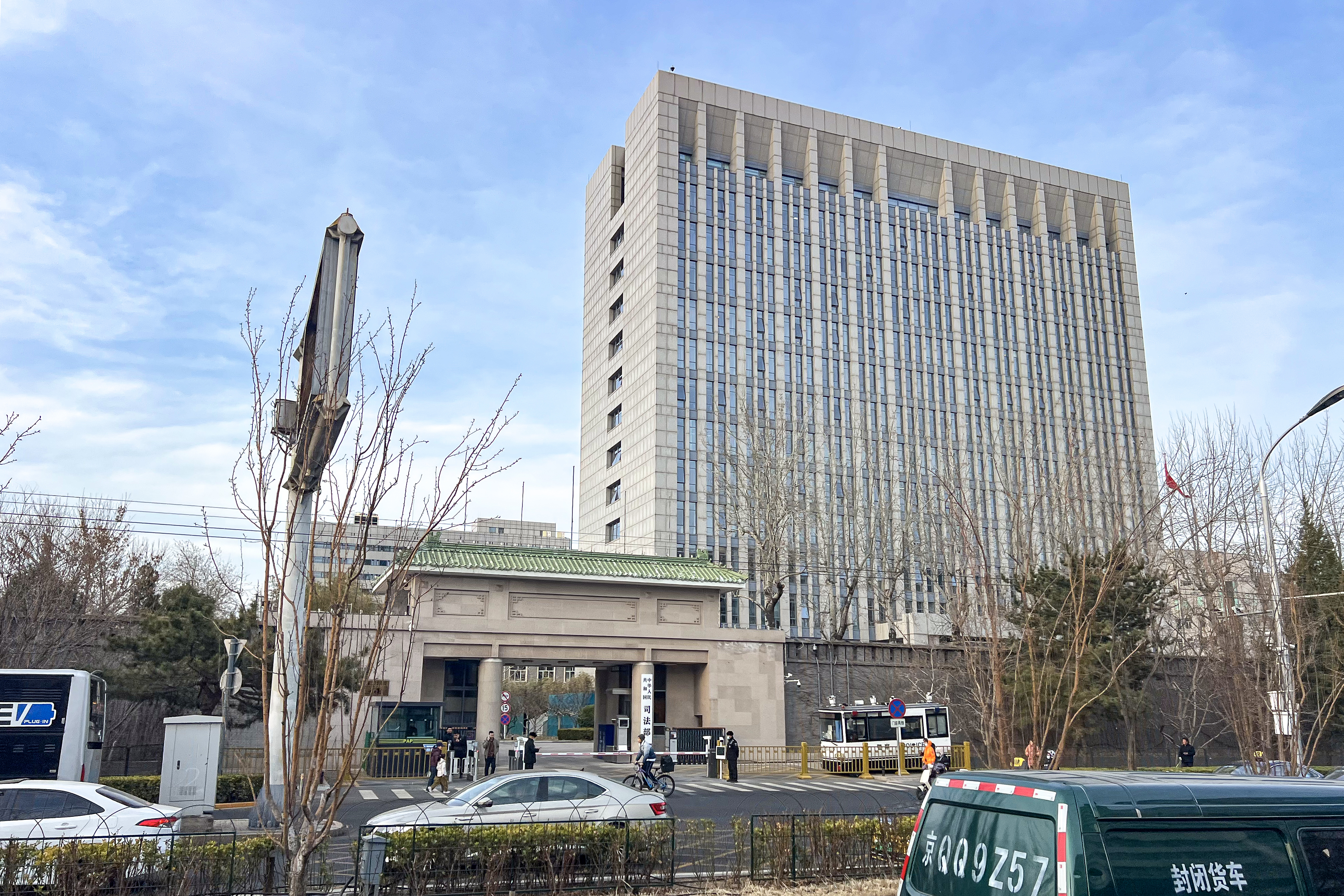
- The Ministry of Justice building in Beijing

Agency overview
- Formed: September 1954; 72 years ago
- Type: Constituent Department of the State Council (cabinet-level)
- Jurisdiction: Government of China
- Headquarters: 41 Ping'anli West Street, Xicheng District, Beijing
- Minister responsible: He Rong, Minister of Justice
- Parent agency: State Council
- Website: moj.gov.cn chinalaw.gov.cn

The Ministry of Justice of the People's Republic of China is a government ministry under the State Council responsible for legal affairs.

The Central People's Government established the Ministry of Justice in October 1949. The ministry assumed its current form in September 1954. In 1959, the Ministry of Justice, along with judicial administrative organs, was abolished. It was restored in 1979. The ministry's range of responsibilities include judicial process, drafting legislation, developing legal framework, participating in national and international treaties, prosecution and sentencing.

== History ==
On October 30, 1949, the Ministry of Justice of the Central People's Government was established; in September 1954, it was transformed into the Ministry of Justice of the People's Republic of China in accordance with the Constitution of China adopted at the first session of the 1st National People's Congress. In 1959, the judicial administrative organs were abolished. In 1979, the Standing Committee of the 5th National People's Congress decided to re-establish the Ministry of Justice. In March 2018, the Legislative Affairs Office of the State Council was absorbed into the MOJ as part of the deepening the reform of the Party and state institutions.

== Functions ==
The range of responsibilities of the Ministry of Justice include judicial process, drafting legislation, developing legal framework, participating in national and international treaties, prosecution and sentencing. The ministry also ensures the maintenance and improvement of China's system of law and justice and its national security.

Per the 2010 People's Mediation Law formalized people's mediation practices, the Ministry's justice administrative organs (JAOs) supervise the local mediation committees.

== Organization ==
The executive head of the ministry is the Minister of Justice. The MOJ houses the Office of the Central Comprehensive Law-based Governance Commission. The MOJ Bureau of Prison Administration (司法部监狱管理局) operates national prisons in China, except the Qincheng Prison, which is administered by the Ministry of Public Security. As of 2024, Fan Lübing (范履冰) is the head of the department.

=== Organizational structure ===
Components
Legal Aid Center of the Ministry of Justice
Crime Prevention Institute of the Ministry of Justice
Judicial Research Institute of the Ministry of Justice
Institute of Forensic Science of the Ministry of Justice
Central College for Judicial Officers
Institute of Judicial Administration
Publishing House of Legal Daily
Publishing House of Law
All China Lawyers' Association
China Public Notary Association
MOJ Bureau of Prison Administration
All China People's Mediators' Association
China Legal Aid Foundation
International Legal Cooperation Center

== See also ==
- Chinese law
- Judicial system of China
- Law of the People's Republic of China
- Law enforcement in China
- Legal Daily
- Legal history of China
- National Unified Legal Professional Qualification Examination
