= Wu Aiying =

Chinese politician

- 吴爱英
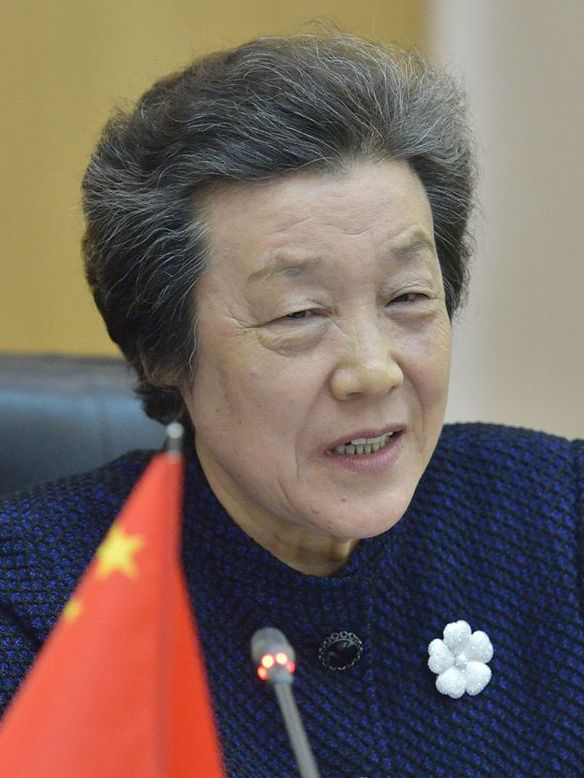

Minister of Justice
- In office 1 July 2005 – 24 February 2017
- Premier: Wen Jiabao; Li Keqiang
- Preceded by: Zhang Fusen
- Succeeded by: Zhang Jun

Personal details
- Born: December 1951 (age 74) Changle, Shandong, China
- Party: Chinese Communist Party (expelled)
- Education: Shandong University

Wu Aiying (simplified Chinese: 吴爱英; traditional Chinese: 吳愛英; pinyin: Wú Àiyīng; born December 1951) is a former Chinese politician who served as the minister of Justice of China from 2005 to 2017, in the cabinets of Premiers Wen Jiabao and Li Keqiang. Previously she held numerous political positions in her native Shandong province. She was investigated for corruption and expelled from the Chinese Communist Party (CCP) in 2017.

== Biography ==
Wu was born 1951 in Changle County, Shandong province, to an ordinary family of peasants, the youngest of three sisters. She was selected as a prospective party member at a very young age. She was educated in Shandong University from 1971 to 1973. After graduating, she returned to her home county to serve as a political instructor, and leader of a local production commune. By 1976, she had become the deputy party secretary of Changle County, at a mere age of 25. In 1978, she began serving in the Communist Youth League; by 1982 she had risen to become deputy provincial secretary of the Shandong Communist Youth League organization. In July 1993, she was named Vice Governor of Shandong.

In Shandong, Wu oversaw legal affairs, including jurisdiction of the courts, prosecution agencies, and law enforcement. Her work with the Jinan traffic police won praise from the central authorities. In 1998, Wu was promoted to Deputy Party Secretary of Shandong province, the third highest political position in the province. In 2002, she was named Chair of the Chinese People's Political Consultative Conference of Shandong province, ascending to full provincial-level status.

In November 2003, Wu was named vice minister of Justice. By July 2005, she ascended to minister of Justice at age 53. She became the second female minister of Justice in the history of the People's Republic, after Shi Liang.

She was an alternate of the 14th, 15th, and 16th Central Committee, and a member of the 17th and the 18th CCP Central Committee.

Sing Tao Daily of Hong Kong reported in June 2017 that Wu was implicated in a credentials fraud case involving fellow Shandong native Lu Enguang, and that she had been expelled from the party in addition to being demoted to a futingji (sub-department) "non-leading" position. On October 11, 2017, the 7th Plenary Session of the 18th CCP Central Committee confirmed Wu's expulsion from the CCP. Wu became the only female full member of the 18th Central Committee to be expelled from the party.

Government offices
| Preceded by Zhang Fusen | Minister of Justice; 2005–2017 | Succeeded by Zhang Jun |
Political offices
| Preceded by Han Xikai | Chairman of the CPPCC Shandong Committee; 2002–2004 | Succeeded by Sun Shuyi |
