= Special Campaign to Combat and Rectify Cybercrime =

2013 Chinese government campaign

The Special Campaign to Combat and Rectify Cybercrime was a concentrated crackdown on cybercrime in China in 2013. It was deployed by the Ministry of Public Security (MPS) and the Vice Ministers Fu Zhenghua and Chen Zhimin were responsible for the specific operation and implementation.

The campaign included what the authorities called online rumors, online prostitution, online pyramid schemes and online extortion. The campaign lasted from June to December 2013. In mid-August, the MPS began to "deepen" the special campaign to combat and rectify cybercrime. The main contents were: "focusing on combating cybercrime; rectifying the order of Internet security management; and establishing a long-term mechanism for combating cybercrime."

The operation escalated further in late August, with the Qin Huohuo case, the Charles Xue ase, and the Fu Xuesheng case all erupting. Some media outlets believe this is related to the fact that Fu Zhenghua, the director of the Beijing Municipal Public Security Bureau, concurrently served as the vice minister of the MPS in August. This has sparked controversy regarding freedom of speech and civil rights. This operation mainly targeted those who spread rumors among the public, with few officials being punished. Luo, the deputy director of the Housing and Urban-Rural Development Bureau of Yueyang City, Hunan Province, was the first official to be criminally detained for spreading rumors.

== Campaign ==
=== Anhui ===
On August 31, 2013, the Suzhou Municipal Committee and Municipal Government of Anhui Province held a meeting to launch the "Clean Internet" campaign. Xu Guangbin, member of the Standing Committee of the Suzhou Municipal Committee and Secretary of the Political and Legal Committee, presided over the meeting. Representatives from the publicity departments and public security bureaus of various districts and counties participated. The Suzhou Municipal Committee of the Chinese Communist Party made comprehensive arrangements for the "Clean Internet" campaign in Suzhou, focusing on cracking down on online rumor-mongering.

Anhui Province reported the results of the action: "381 criminal cases involving the Internet were handled, 427 people were criminally detained, 208 people were arrested, 143 people were given administrative penalties, and 29 criminal gangs were dismantled; 513 websites lacking operating qualifications were guided to be shut down by IDCs; 19 websites were warned and punished in accordance with relevant administrative regulations on network management, 97 websites were ordered to rectify within a time limit, 2 websites were shut down for rectification, and 7 websites were shut down from the Internet. The number of illegal information decreased by 36% and 48% year-on-year in July and August, respectively, and the Internet order gradually improved."

=== Beijing ===
On August 19, the police searched Beijing Erma Interactive Marketing Planning Co., Ltd. and arrested six people, including Qin Huohuo and Li Erchai Si, the main members of the company, on charges of fabricating and spreading more than 3,000 rumors, deliberately creating and spreading rumors online, maliciously infringing on the reputation of others, and illegally seizing economic benefits.

On August 25, Liu Hu, a reporter from the New Express, was detained by the Yubei District Public Security Bureau of Chongqing Municipality on suspicion of "spreading rumors". The police also took away his computer. On July 29, Liu Hu filed a real-name report against Ma Zhengqi, deputy director of the State Administration for Industry and Commerce, claiming that Ma Zhengqi was suspected of serious dereliction of duty in the reform of state-owned enterprises during his tenure in Chongqing, resulting in the misappropriation of 10 million yuan of state-owned assets. The State Administration for Industry and Commerce did not respond to this matter.

On September 5, the 1589th meeting of the Judicial Committee of the Supreme People's Court and the 9th meeting of the 12th Procuratorial Committee of the Supreme People's Procuratorate on September 2, 2013, adopted the "Interpretation on Several Issues Concerning the Application of Law in Handling Criminal Cases of Defamation and Other Crimes Committed Through Information Networks" and promulgated it the following day. It officially came into effect on September 10.

=== Gansu ===
On September 17, the Public Security Bureau of Zhangjiachuan County, Tianshui City, Gansu Province detained Yang, a junior high school student from Zhangjiachuan Hui Autonomous County, Gansu Province. The police said that on the afternoon of September 14, Yang spread rumors on his Weibo and QQ space, such as "the police argued with the masses and beat the family of the deceased", "the murderer police knew about it beforehand", and "it seems that a march must be held". Moreover, the number of reposts exceeded the limit of 500 times stipulated by the Supreme People's Court of the People's Republic of China. "Spreading rumors and inciting the masses to march seriously disrupted the social management order and brought great passivity to the public security organs in handling the case of Gao's abnormal death, causing a bad social impact."

In March 2014, the benzene content in the tap water supplied to Lanzhou City by Lanzhou Veolia Water Group Co., Ltd. in Gansu Province was seriously excessive, and the tap water had a strong odor. Citizens of Lanzhou complained about this water quality problem that seriously threatened the lives of the people on the Internet and in the streets. At that time, the Lanzhou Municipal Government took advantage of the opportunity of the "2013 Special Action of the People's Republic of China to Combat and Rectify Network Illegal and Criminal Activities" to arbitrarily arrest people who talked about the "tap water safety problem" and said that these people's claim that there was a problem with the tap water in Lanzhou City was pure "rumor". On April 12, 2014, the mayor of Lanzhou City was forced to apologize to the people of the city for the "tap water problem".

=== Guangdong ===
On August 26, 2013, Shenzhen police arrested two people, Tan and Li, for distorting and sensationalizing online hot topics and placed them under administrative detention for "picking quarrels and provoking trouble". On August 27, 2013, Guangzhou police arrested a netizen surnamed Zhang for "defaming" the CCP martyrs " Five Heroes of Langya Mountain," claiming that they had bullied ordinary people with guns and that the people had told the Imperial Japanese Army about their whereabouts. He was given seven days of administrative detention.

=== Hebei ===
On August 26, 2013, the Public Security Bureau of Qinghe County, Xingtai City, Hebei Province, administratively detained a 20-year-old woman named Zhao. Zhao posted a message on the Baidu Tieba "Qinghe Bar" saying, "I heard that a murder occurred in Louzhuang. Does anyone know the truth?"

=== Henan ===
Pingdingshan City, Henan Province, launched a six-month campaign to crack down on "criminal activities that use the Internet to incite subversion of state power, overthrow of the socialist system, incite secession of the country, and undermine national unity; and illegal and criminal activities that use the Internet to steal or leak state secrets, intelligence and military secrets, which endanger national security and social stability." On August 23, Pingdingshan officials said: "There were 88 cases of online illegal and criminal activities, 64 people were criminally detained, 45 people were given administrative penalties, and 27 people were arrested."

=== Hubei ===
Police in Wuhan, Hubei Province, have busted a company that spread rumors online, arresting 27 people. The company had 600 "50-cent party" members who were rewarded with 50 cents for each post. They were distributed across 28 provinces and cities and included 312 "big V" accounts.

=== Hunan ===
On August 26, 2013, the Hunan Provincial Internet Propaganda Office stated that since May 2013, the Hunan Provincial Party Committee and Provincial Government have responded to the "Special Action for Concentrated Crackdown on Internet Crime" launched by the Central People's Government of the People's Republic of China and launched the "Special Action for Concentrated Governance of Internet Rumors". More than 10 websites were investigated, more than 320 Weibo accounts suspected of "fraud, pyramid schemes, etc." were shut down, more than 6,700 pieces of information were intercepted and filtered, and 4,560 pieces of irregular information were corrected.

On the third day of the third lunar month in 2012, rumors circulated in many parts of Changsha that "herb vegetables are poisonous." The Changsha Center for Disease Control and Prevention refuted the rumors and subsequently arrested those who spread the rumors via "text messages." In September 2012, Zhao, a college student in Changsha, spread the message "A girl in Changsha was gang-raped by three patriotic youths " in a QQ group. The Changsha Public Security Bureau arrested Zhao, reprimanded him, ordered him to write a guarantee, and asked him to apologize and clarify the facts in the QQ group.

In 2013, a Weibo post claimed that "the driver of bus route 168 in Changsha turned off the engine and got off the bus to smoke because passengers refused to buy tickets. A woman from the passengers 'came out', sat in the driver's seat, started the engine, closed the door, and started the bus in one go. The bus sped along with the passengers until she got off at the stop she wanted. The woman turned off the engine, opened the door, and got off the bus. The driver then took a taxi and chased after her. Everyone on the bus was stunned... Changsha, a city you can't mess with!" The Changsha Public Security Bureau investigated the Weibo post and found that it had spread all over China, only changing the city and bus route, but no one was arrested for spreading the rumor. At the same time, there was a Weibo and WeChat post that claimed that "156 girls in Changsha KTVs have AIDS, and seven or eight in a certain hotel! And it has spread to ordinary people. Yesterday alone, 13 people born in the 1990s were diagnosed with AIDS." On August 2, the Changsha Center for Disease Control and Prevention said that the Weibo post was a rumor and the content was untrue. It had also appeared in various parts of China, only the location had changed to Changsha.

On August 23, 2013, the People's Court of Linli County, Changde City, ordered the couple who fabricated the rumors to apologize in person to Liu Jun (pseudonym), the deputy director of the local bureau, and to apologize on Weibo. The incident was caused by the daughter of Liu Jun, the deputy director of a bureau in Linli County, hitting the couple's son with her car. Liu Jun's family delayed paying 5,000 yuan in medical expenses. Helpless, the couple posted on Sina Weibo that "the deputy director hit someone". In fact, it was the deputy director's daughter who hit someone. In September 2013, Luo, deputy director of the Yueyang Municipal Housing and Urban-Rural Development Bureau, was criminally detained for spreading rumors that a certain fish restaurant used swill oil.

=== Jiangsu ===
Jiangsu Provincial Public Security Bureau arrested Zhou Lubao on suspicion of "online extortion." In June 2011, while traveling in Yangshuo, Guilin, Guangxi, Zhou Lubao saw several people donating several hundred yuan to Jianshan Temple. Suspecting fraudulent activities, he posted an article online titled "Monks Eat People Without Spitting Out Bones, Who Shames?" On August 3, 2011, the abbot of Jianshan Temple transferred 40,000 yuan to Zhou Lubao's account. On August 8, Zhou Lubao posted another article, "Guilin Jianshan Temple Faces 'Internet Affairs' Directly, Achieving Online Supervision," in which he expressed "deep apology." In mid-August, Zhou Lubao posted about Xiuzhen Temple in Wuzhen, Zhejiang, reporting that the temple "forced guests to burn incense and charged exorbitant incense fees." He also repeatedly called the abbot, who transferred 68,000 yuan to Zhou Lubao's account on August 22. In 2012, a conflict arose between a local government and a developer over land acquisition and residents. The residents disagreed with the land sale and sought help from Zhou Lubao. The residents collectively raised 220,000 yuan and paid 60,000 yuan to Zhou Lubao in advance. Zhou Lubao then posted on the Internet criticizing the local government and the developer. The local government and the developer were forced to negotiate with Zhou Lubao about the land acquisition and paid him 800,000 yuan to keep quiet. After receiving the money, Zhou Lubao posted a message praising the local government and the developer for "facing the problem head-on and improving the problem."

=== Ningxia ===
On June 26, the Public Security Department of Ningxia Hui Autonomous Region held a "Television and Telephone Conference on the Special Campaign to Combat and Rectify Cybercrime", involving ten departments including public security, publicity, courts, procuratorates, civil affairs, industry and commerce, communications management, the People's Bank of China, the China Banking Regulatory Commission, and radio and television. The campaign will last for six months from June to December.

=== Qinghai ===
On July 26, Qinghai Province issued the "Work Plan for the Special Campaign to Combat and Rectify Illegal and Criminal Activities on the Internet". The Qinghai Provincial People's Government stated that after the campaign, the online order and online public opinion environment have significantly improved.

=== Shanxi ===
Netizens "Li Junpeng" and "Jianghu Xiaohualu" were criminally detained in Jinzhong City, Shanxi Province for spreading rumors. They were criminally detained for five days in accordance with Article 25 of the Law of the People's Republic of China on Penalties for Administration of Public Security.

=== Shaanxi ===
Shaanxi police handled a total of 6 cases of cybercrime, rectified 283 internet companies, and arrested 22 cybercrime suspects.

=== Shanghai ===
On August 20, Fu Xuesheng, president of an information company, was arrested on suspicion of "spreading rumors". His Weibo posts mainly claimed that "the deputy district head embezzled more than 2 billion yuan and kept more than 10 mistresses" and "a female director of Sinopec accepted sexual bribes from an 'African gigolo'". The police said that he "composite pictures, made up stories, hired 50-cent party members, and hyped it up".
