= First Circuit Court of the Supreme People's Court =

Court in People's Republic of China

The First Circuit Court of the Supreme People's Court of the People's Republic of China (中华人民共和国最高人民法院第一巡回法庭) is a circuit court created in December 2014 and opened on January 28, 2015, in Shenzhen, China. It has jurisdiction in the provinces of Guangdong, Guangxi, and Hainan.

Differing from a circuit court in a common law jurisdiction, the First Circuit is part of a pilot program to establish circuit courts of the Supreme People's Court outside Beijing, the seat of the national government, with the same level of jurisdiction of the supreme court, i.e. cases decided by the circuit courts are deemed finally decided by the supreme court itself. The pilot program is carried out in an effort to avoid local influences.

== See also ==
- Judicial system of China
