= Mao Wenchao =

CEO and co-founder of Xiaohongshu

- 毛文超
- Born: 1985 (age 40–41); Wuhan, Hubei, China
- Other name: Charlwin Mao
- Citizenship: Chinese
- Education: Shanghai Jiao Tong University; Stanford University
- Occupations: CEO and co-founder of Xiaohongshu

Mao Wenchao, also known as Charlwin Mao, is the CEO and co-founder of Xiaohongshu (Red Note), a Shanghai-based social media and e-commerce platform. He was born in Hubei Province of China. He attended Shanghai Jiao Tong University beginning in 2003, majoring in Mechatronics. He participated in exchange programs with overseas universities and university entrepreneurship competitions. Mao later attended Stanford University for his MBA studies. Mao graduated in 2007 with a degree in Computer Science and Engineering and went on to work at Bain & Company.

Mao co-founded Xiaohongshu along with his colleague Miranda Qu in 2013, which as of December 2025, has over 300 million users. At the age of 36, he was listed as one of the Top 10 Chinese business elites under 40 when in 2020 along with Xiaohongshu co-founder Qu Fang. In 2023, Xiaohongshu's revenue surpassed CNY 10 billion (USD 1.4 billion).

== Education ==
Mao was born in Hubei Province of China. In 2003, he was admitted to Shanghai Jiao Tong University majoring in Mechatronics. He participated in international exchange programs, including MBA studies at Stanford University's Graduate School of Business, focusing on business and technology. He graduated in 2007 with a Bachelor's degree in Computer Science and Engineering.

== Career ==
After graduating, he went on to work for Bain and Company and Bain Capital, management consulting and private equity firms. Mao Wenchao spent a lot of time traveling and within a few years of leaving college, he had visited an excess of 20 countries. He has stated his travels inspired him to start a business that gave shopping advise to Chinese tourists that were traveling abroad.

In 2013 he co-founded Xiaohongshu with Qu Feng, also known as Miranda Qu, who Forbes has reported to have a net worth of approximately $1.3 billion. The name "Xiohongshu" translates to "Little Red Book". The phrase is a title for a book of quotations by People's Republic of China founder Mao Zedong. Mao Wenchao has stated the color scheme's inspiration came from the colors of Stanford University and Bain Capitol, which he viewed as American business icons, and is largely apolitical.

The app quickly gained a large user base and has approximately 300 million active monthly users in 2024 and a valuation of $20 billion USD. In 2020, Mao was listed by China Daily as one of China's Top 10 business elites under 40 when he was 36 years old. Xiaohongshu is now owned by Xingyin Information Technology, a Shanghai-based company, with Mao listed as CEO.

At the office, Mao has implemented a mix of both progressive and professional work culture. On Fridays, the staff are allowed to bring their dogs and cats to the office. Corporate nicknames are also used. Mao goes by Seiya, and Qu was given the nickname 'Mulan', after the historical folk heroine. Alternatively, Mao has been known to interview potential new hires late at night to test their level of commitment.
