= Xi Xiaoming =

Chinese judge

Xi Xiaoming 奚晓明

Vice-President of the Supreme People's Court
- In office June 2004 – July 2015
- President: Wang Shengjun → Zhou Qiang

Personal details
- Born: June 1954 (age 72) Changzhou, Jiangsu, China
- Party: Chinese Communist Party (expelled)
- Education: Jilin University; Peking University; University of London

Xi Xiaoming (Chinese: 奚晓明; pinyin: Xī Xiǎomíng; born June 1954) is a disgraced Chinese judge, who served as Vice President of the Supreme People's Court, the top court and a fourth-ranked judge in China, between June 2004 and July 2015. In July 2015, he was abruptly removed from office by the Communist Party's top disciplinary body, suspected of corruption.

== Life and career ==
Xi Xiaoming was born in Changzhou, Jiangsu, in June 1954. He graduated from Jilin University in January 1982, majoring in law. He received his Master of Laws from Peking University in 1993. From September 1991 to September 1992 he studied at the University of London as a part-time student.

He joined the workforce in January 1972 and joined the Chinese Communist Party in September 1975. During the Cultural Revolution, he worked as a policeman in Heping District of Shenyang, from January 1972 to March 1978.

After graduation, he was assigned to the Supreme People's Court and over a period of 22 years worked his way up to the position of vice-president.

On July 12, 2015, he was being investigated by the Central Commission for Discipline Inspection of the Chinese Communist Party for "serious violations of laws and regulations". Xi was expelled from the Communist Party on September 29, 2015.

On February 16, 2017, Xi was sentenced to life in prison for taking bribes worth 114 million yuan (~$16.72 million) by the Second Intermediate People's Court in Tianjin.
