= 1996 Beijing Cash Truck Robbery =

1996 armed robbery in Beijing

The 1996 Beijing Cash Truck Robbery was an armed robbery that took place on February 8, 1996, at the Ganshiqiao ICBC bank branch located in Beijing.

== Event ==
At 9:50 a.m. on February 8, 1996, the staff at the Ganshiqiao ICBC branch in Beijing had finished loading a secure box of bank notes into an armored car parked outside. A masked armed assailant then emerged from a nearby blue sedan and opened fire. A security guard and an armored car staff member were hit by bullets, both of whom died on the scene. The masked man then grabbed the box containing the bank notes and fled. The box contained 1,160,000 CNY in bank notes (approximately US$140,000 at contemporary exchange rates)

== Aftermath ==
The suspected assailant was Lu Xianzhou (鹿宪州) a convicted criminal who had escaped from jail in 1994 after being imprisoned there for armed robbery. He got together with some gang members following his escape and went on a spree of robberies during the years 1994–1996. Following his success in the cash truck robbery, Lu Xianzhou again robbed two more armoured cars on June 3 and August 26 of the same year. He reportedly had set a goal for himself to steal at least 20,000,000 RMB.

At midnight September 8, 1996, he went to a restaurant in Beijing and the police laid an ambush for him outside. The police opened fire on him as he left and wounded him. He was taken to hospital and died from his wounds in November. Eight others were arrested in connection with him and his gang, four of whom were sentenced to execution and four of whom were sentenced to prison.

One of the investigators in the Beijing police who worked on the case at the time was Fu Zhenghua, who later became the minister of justice in Xi Jinping's government.
