= Third Circuit Court of the Supreme People's Court =

Court in People's Republic of China

The Third Circuit Court of Supreme People's Court of People's Republic of China opened on December 28, 2016, in Nanjing. It acts in the same authority as the Supreme People's Court and has jurisdiction in Jiangsu, Zhejiang, Fujian, Jiangxi, and Shanghai.

== Judges ==
Chief Judge

- Jiang Bixin (江必新) (also branch secretary of the Party) (since December 2016)

Deputy Judges

- Li Chengyu (李成玉) (also deputy branch secretary of the Party) (since December 2018)
- He Shu (何抒) (also branch member of the Party) (since December 2018)
- Liu Yalin (刘雅玲) (since December 2018)

Judges

The court has 16 judges.

== Facility and access ==
The court sits at 88 North Puzhu Rd, Pukou, Nanjing, Jiangsu 210031 (江苏省南京市浦口区浦珠北路88号). It is open to public from Monday to Thursday 08:30-11:30, 14:30-17:30. Appeal requests and trial files can be mailed to the same address.

== See also ==
- Supreme People's Court
