= Fourth Circuit Court of the Supreme People's Court =

Court in People's Republic of China

The Fourth Circuit Court of the Supreme People's Court of People's Republic of China was opened on December 28, 2016 in Zhengzhou. It acts in the same authority as the Supreme People's Court and has jurisdiction in Henan, Shanxi, Anhui, and Hubei provinces.
