= Sixth Circuit Court of the Supreme People's Court =

Court in People's Republic of China

The Sixth Circuit Court of the Supreme People's Court of People's Republic of China was opened on December 29, 2016 in Xi'an. It acts with the same authority as the Supreme People's Court and has jurisdiction over Shaanxi, Gansu, Qinghai, Ningxia and Xinjiang.
