= Xiao Yang (judge) =

Chief Justice of the Supreme People's Court of China

Chief Justice Xiao Yang
- 肖扬

President of the Supreme People's Court
- In office 17 March 1998 – 16 March 2008
- Preceded by: Ren Jianxin
- Succeeded by: Wang Shengjun

Minister of Justice
- In office 29 March 1993 – 19 March 1998
- Premier: Li Peng
- Preceded by: Cai Cheng
- Succeeded by: Gao Changli

Personal details
- Born: 1 August 1938 Heyuan, China
- Died: 19 April 2019 (aged 80) Beijing, China
- Party: Chinese Communist Party

Chinese name
- Traditional Chinese: 蕭揚
- Simplified Chinese: 肖扬
Transcriptions
Standard Mandarin
- Hanyu Pinyin: Xiāo Yáng
- Wade–Giles: Hsiao^{1} Yang^{2}
- IPA: [ɕjáʊ jǎŋ]
Hakka
- Romanization: Xiau^{1} Yong^{2}
- Pha̍k-fa-sṳ: Sêu Yòng
Yue: Cantonese
- Yale Romanization: Chiu Yèuhng
- Jyutping: Ciu3 Joeng4
- IPA: [tsʰiw˧ jœŋ˩]

Xiao Yang (Chinese: 肖扬; 1 August 1938 – 19 April 2019) was a Chinese judge and politician. He served as minister of Justice from 1993 to 1998 and president of the Supreme People's Court from 1998 to 2008. His tenure as China's Chief Justice was marked by the implementation of major reforms. A key reform was his restoration of the Supreme Court's right of final review for capital punishment cases, which resulted in a sharp reduction in the number of executions in China after 2006. Another of his reforms was to professionalize the rank of judges by requiring most new judges to pass the National Judicial Examination. He also advocated judicial independence in the country, but was ultimately unsuccessful.

== Early life ==
Xiao was born in August 1938 in Heyuan, Guangdong, China. He entered the Department of Law of the Renmin University of China in 1957 and graduated in 1962.

== Career ==
=== Guangdong ===
In 1962, Xiao taught at the Political Science and Law School of Xinjiang for a few months before returning to his home province of Guangdong to work in the government of Qujiang County of Shaoguan. He joined the Chinese Communist Party (CCP) in 1966.

Xiao served as Party Committee Secretary of Wujiang District, Shaoguan from 1981 to 1983. He became deputy procurator-general of Guangdong Province in 1983, and was promoted to procurator-general in 1986. In that capacity, he reformed Guangdong's judiciary system and created China's first anti-corruption bureau in the province. He also established a center for economic crimes in Shenzhen.

=== Deputy Procurator-general and Minister of Justice ===
In 1990, Xiao was transferred to the national government to serve as deputy procurator-general of the Supreme People's Procuratorate. Three years later, he was appointed minister of Justice in the cabinet of Premier Li Peng. He initiated a number of reforms, including the establishment of a legal aid system in China. He also promoted the rule of law, which was officially adopted in 1997 as a governing principle by the Communist Party.

=== Reforms as Chief Justice of the Supreme People's Court ===
In March 1998, Xiao was elected President (Chief Justice) of the Supreme People's Court, succeeding Ren Jianxin. He was re-elected in March 2003 for a second term.

Starting in 1999, he initiated a series of reforms, the most important being the restoration of the Supreme Court's right of review for capital punishment. In the 1980s, the National People's Congress had passed legislation to grant provincial high courts the final say in death-penalty cases. Provincial judges, many of whom were former police or military officers without formal legal training, often imposed overly harsh punishments. This resulted in high numbers of executions, including some that later proved to be wrongful. Xiao's proposal to reduce executions met significant opposition, as capital punishment enjoyed wide support both within the government and among the general public in China. One of Xiao's tactics was to encourage the use of death sentence with reprieve (which is typically commuted to life sentence) as an alternative to death sentence. He also seized upon the signature rhetoric, "Harmonious Society", of then-CCP general secretary Hu Jintao, and argued that a harmonious society called for fewer executions. In 2006, he won a key change in the law that restored the Supreme Court's right of final review for death penalty. With the implementation of Xiao's reform in 2007, the number of death sentences plunged by 30% in that year, and many cases were sent back to provincial courts for retrial. The number of executions in China has been further reduced since then, by half to two-thirds in some provinces as of 2019, compared with before the reform.

Another reform by Xiao was to professionalize China's rank of judges, who were formerly appointed like normal politicians, with little regard to their education and experience in law. Xiao's efforts resulted in the National Congress amending the Judges Law in 2001 to require all new judges to pass the National Judicial Examination. Except for presidents of the courts, who remain political appointees, all other judges are henceforth required to have legal qualifications.

Other reforms implemented by Xiao include opening most trials to the general public (since 1998), and some trials were even televised. He also advocated but failed to make the court independent from political influence. Despite his efforts, the Communist Party retains absolute control of China's judicial system, and after his retirement in 2008, none of his successors have advocated judicial independence again.

Xiao was a member of the 15th and the 16th Central Committees of the Chinese Communist Party.

== Death ==
Xiao died of an illness in Beijing on 19 April 2019, at the age of 80 (81 in East Asian age reckoning).

Legal offices
Preceded by Ren Jianxin	President of the Supreme People's Court; 1998–2008	Succeeded by Wang Shengjun
Government offices
Preceded by Cai Cheng	Minister of Justice; 1993–1998	Succeeded by Gao Changli
