= Gao Changli =

Chinese politician

Gao Changli (simplified Chinese: 高昌礼; traditional Chinese: 高昌禮; pinyin: Gāo Chānglǐ; born July 1937 in Yutai County, Jining, Shandong) is a politician of the People's Republic of China.

== Biography ==
He joined the Chinese Communist Party in 1956.

Gao graduated from Renmin University of China in 1963.

In 1993, Gao was a senior member of China's Supreme People's Court. He was the minister of Justice from 1998 to 2000.

Some accounts stated that Gao was under investigation by the Chinese government for corruption. In 2000, reports from newspapers in Hong Kong and the West, basing from ministry sources, stated that Gao was detained for questioning about his economic wrongdoings.

Gao was an alternate of the 15th Central Committee of the Chinese Communist Party.

Government offices
Preceded by Xiao Yang	Minister of Justice; 1998–2000	Succeeded by Zhang Fusen
