= Committee for Social and Legal Affairs =

Special Committee of the CPPCC National Committee

- 中国人民政治协商会议全国委员会 社会和法制委员会
- Formation: June 9, 1988; 38 years ago
- Type: Special committee of the CPPCC
- Location: Beijing
- Chairperson: Xu Lingyi
- Parent organization: National Committee of the Chinese People's Political Consultative Conference

Chinese name
- Simplified Chinese: 中国人民政治协商会议全国委员会社会和法制委员会
- Traditional Chinese: 中國人民政治協商會議全國委員會社會和法制委員會
Transcriptions
Standard Mandarin
- Hanyu Pinyin: Zhōngguó Rénmín Zhèngzhì Xiéshāng Huìyì Quánguó Wěiyuánhuì Shèhuì Hè Fǎzhì Wěiyuánhuì

Shortest form
- Simplified Chinese: 全国政协社会和法制委员会
- Traditional Chinese: 全國政協社會和法制委員會
Transcriptions
Standard Mandarin
- Hanyu Pinyin: Quánguó Zhèngxié Shèhuì Hè Fǎzhì Wěiyuánhuì

The Committee for Social and Legal Affairs is one of ten special committees of the National Committee of the Chinese People's Political Consultative Conference, China's top political advisory body and a central part of the Chinese Communist Party's united front system.

== History ==
The Social and Legal Affairs Committee was created in June 1988 during the 7th National Committee of the Chinese People's Political Consultative Conference.

== List of chairpersons ==
No.	Chairpersons	Took office	Left office	Notes
7th	Ma Wenrui	June 1988	21 May 1993	
7th	Kang Keqing	June 1988	21 May 1993	
8th	Hua Liankui	21 May 1993	16 March 1998	
8th	Guan Tao	21 May 1993	16 March 1998	
8th	Qian Zhengying	21 May 1993	16 March 1998	
9th	Wang Senhao	16 March 1998	15 March 2003	
10th	Li Qiyan	15 March 2003	15 March 2008	
11th	Zhang Fusen	15 March 2008	13 March 2013	
12th	Meng Xuenong	13 March 2013	16 March 2018	
13th	Shen Deyong	16 March 2018	22 June 2022	
14th	Xu Lingyi	13 March 2023	Incumbent	

== See also ==
- Social Development Affairs Committee of the NPC
- NPC Constitution and Law Committee
- NPC Supervisory and Judicial Affairs Committee
