= Tencent Appstore =

Chinese app distribution platform

- Developer: Tencent
- Initial release: 2012; 14 years ago, in China
- Platform: Android (open-source), Microsoft Windows
- Type: app store, digital distribution, mobile game store
- Website: sj.qq.com

Tencent Appstore (Chinese: 應用寶, romanized: Yīngyòngbāo) is a Chinese app distribution platform developed and operated by Tencent. It primarily serves users of Android devices in the Chinese market, where Google Play Store has limited availability due to government restrictions.

== History ==
Tencent Appstore was launched in 2012. It has gained users in part due to its integration with the rest of Tencent's social media, including WeChat and QQ. In 2017, it was approved by the Ministry of Industry and Information Technology as a "trusted" application store. As of 2024, Tencent Appstore had 187 million monthly active users.

== See also ==
- List of mobile app distribution platforms
- Google Play
- Huawei AppGallery
