= Yang Xiao (scientist) =

American computer scientist

Yang Xiao (Chinese: 肖杨; pinyin: Xiāo Yáng) is a professor of computer science at the University of Alabama.

== Biography ==
Yang Xiao (Fellow, IEEE) received the B.S. and M.S. degrees in computational mathematics from Jilin University, Changchun, China, in 1989 and 1991, respectively, and the M.S. and Ph.D. degrees in computer science and engineering from Wright State University, Dayton, OH, USA, in 2000 and 2001, respectively. He is a Full Professor at the Department of Computer Science, The University of Alabama, Tuscaloosa, AL, USA. He directed over 20 doctoral dissertations and supervised more than 20 M.S. theses/projects. His research interests include cyber-physical systems, the Internet of Things, security, wireless networks, smart grids, and telemedicine. He has published more than 600 papers (400+ SCI-indexed journal papers (including 80+ IEEE/ACM Transactions) and 200+ conference papers or book chapters) with more than 32K+ citations and h-index=89 by Google Scholar. His research had been supported by the U.S. National Science Foundation (NSF), the U.S. Army Research, Fleet & Industrial Supply Center San Diego (FISCSD), the University of Alabama's Research Grants Committee, etc.

He was a Voting Member of the IEEE 802.11 Working Group from 2001 to 2004, involved in the IEEE 802.11 (Wi-Fi) standardization work. He is a Fellow of IEEE, IET, and AAIS. He holds the Certificate of Senior Software Engineer issued by the State Council of China in 1991. He served as a Guest Editor more than 40 times for different international journals, including the IEEE Transactions on Cybernetics (TCYB), IEEE Journal on Selected Areas in Communications (JSAC) in 2022-2023, IEEE Transactions on Network Science and Engineering (TNSE) in 2021, IEEE Transactions on Green Communications and Networking in 2021, IEEE Network in 2007 and 2024, IEEE Wireless Communications in 2006 and 2021, IEEE Communications Standards Magazine in 2021 and 2024, and Mobile Networks and Applications (MONET) (ACM/Springer) in 2008. He has been serving as an Editorial Board Member or an Associate Editor for 20 international journals, including the IEEE TNSE since 2022, the IEEE TCYB since 2020, IEEE Transactions on Systems, Man, and Cybernetics: Systems from 2014 to 2015, IEEE Transactions on Vehicular Technology from 2007 to 2009, and IEEE Communications Surveys and Tutorials from 2007 to 2014. He has served as a Member of the Technical Program Committee for over 300 conferences. He received the IEEE TNSE Excellent Editor Award in 2022 and 2023.
