= Dong Junshu =

Chinese politician

Dong Junshu (Chinese: 董君舒, born 1949), is the current Secretary General of the Discipline Inspection Commission for Shanghai Municipality. He is also a member of newly elected Central Commission for Discipline Inspection of the Chinese Communist Party, and a Standing Committee of the Shanghai Municipal Party Committee.

== Biography ==
Born in Fenghua City, Ningbo, Zhejiang Province in January 1949, Dong graduated from Hangzhou University (current Zhejiang University), obtained a bachelor's degree on economic science. He joined the Chinese Communist Party in January 1981.

In March 1997, Dong became the vice mayor of Shaoxing City, Zhejiang Province. In November 1997, he was promoted to be the acting mayor of Shaoxing. Dec. 1998, he became the Secretary-in-General (party chief) of Shaoxing.

In October 2001, Dong was transferred to the neighbouring Jiangxi Province, and became one of the party chiefs there. In December 2006, he became the Secretary-in-General of the Jiangxi Provincial Commission for Discipline Inspection.

According to the latest news, Dong was transferred to Shanghai Municipality, and now is in charge of the Shanghai's discipline inspection. After landing on Shanghai, he first appeared at the Pudong New District for inspection.
