= Zhang Fusen =

Chinese politician

Zhang Fusen (simplified Chinese: 张福森; traditional Chinese: 張福森; pinyin: Zhāng Fúsēn; born March 1940 in Shunyi, Beijing) is a politician of the People's Republic of China.

== Biography ==
He joined the Chinese Communist Party (CCP) in 1958 and graduated from Tsinghua University in 1965.

Zhang was the minister of Justice from December 2000 to July 2005. He was on the 14th, 15th, and 16th CCP Central Committee from 1992 to 2007.

Government offices
Preceded by Gao Changli	Minister of Justice; 2000–2005	Succeeded by Wu Aiying
