= National Unified Legal Professional Qualification Examination =

National bar examination of China

The National Unified Legal Professional Qualification Examination (国家统一法律职业资格考试), commonly abbreviated as Legal Exam, is the national bar examination of the People's Republic of China. This examination is administered by the Ministry of Justice. According to the law, those who serve as judges, prosecutors, lawyers, notaries, legal advisors, legal arbitrators, and those in government departments who are engaged in the review of administrative penalty decisions, administrative reconsideration, and administrative rulings are required to pass the legal professional qualification examination.

Since the exam was established and first administered in 2018, the annual pass rate has remained at 10% to 15%. Before the 2018 legal examination reform, the examination was known as the National Judicial Examination (国家司法考试), which was administered annually from 2002 to 2017.

== Examination eligibility ==
According to the Ministry of Justice of China, individuals meeting all of the following criteria may register for the exam:

- Possess the nationality of the People's Republic of China;
- Uphold the Constitution of the People's Republic of China, and have the right to vote and stand for election;
- Possess sound political and professional qualities as well as good moral character;
- Possess full capacity for civil conduct; and
- Hold a full-time bachelor's degree (or higher) in law from a regular institution of higher education; OR hold a full-time bachelor's degree (or higher) in a non-law discipline from a regular institution of higher education and possess a Master of Laws (LL.M.) or Juris Master (J.M.) degree (or higher); OR hold a full-time bachelor's degree (or higher) in a non-law discipline from a regular institution of higher education and have engaged in legal work (Note: Similar to legal apprenticeship arrangements in many other jurisdictions.) for at least three years.

Individuals falling under any of the following circumstances are ineligible to register for the exam:

- Having received a criminal penalty for an intentional crime;
- Having been dismissed from public office, or having had their lawyer's practicing license or notary's practicing license revoked;
- Having had their legal professional qualification license revoked;
- Being subject to a penalty barring registration (Note: This measure, which imposes a ban on exam registration for either a limited or indefinite period, is intended to penalize individuals for cheating or repeated cheating, respectively, in the legal examination.) for the National Unified Legal Professional Qualification Examination for a period of two years (where the penalty period has not yet expired) or being subject to a lifetime ban on registering for the National Unified Legal Professional Qualification Examination (or the National Judicial Examination);
- Being designated as a subject for joint disciplinary action due to serious acts of dishonesty (Note: This measure is used to penalize individuals for certain dishonesty-related unresolved legal matters, including being listed by a civil court as a dishonest judgment debtor due to outstanding debts and intentionally transferring assets in violation of court orders, significant tax evasion, serious arrears in migrant workers' wages, and industry-specific crimes causing serious consequences in food safety or workplace safety.) by relevant state authorities and included in the national credit information sharing platform; or
- Being subject to a lifetime ban on practicing in the legal profession due to other circumstances.

== Examination content ==
=== Subjects ===
The legal exam is composed of an Objective Test and a Subjective Test. The Objective Test is taken first, and after successfully passing the test, candidates can take the subsequent Subjective Test.

The Objective Test is divided into Paper 1 and Paper 2. The test subjects are:

- Paper 1: Socialist legal theory with Chinese characteristics, jurisprudence, constitution, Chinese legal history, international law, judicial system and legal professional ethics, criminal law, criminal procedure law, administrative law and administrative procedure law;
- Paper 2: Civil law, intellectual property law, commercial law, economic law, environmental resources law, labor and social security law, private international law, international economic law, civil procedure law (including arbitration system).

The Subjective Test consists of one paper. The main subjects are: socialist legal theory with Chinese characteristics, jurisprudence, constitution, criminal law, criminal procedure law, civil law, commercial law, civil procedure law (including arbitration system), administrative law and administrative procedure law, judicial system and legal professional ethics.

=== Scope ===
The legal examination implements a national unified proposition. The range of propositions is based on the "National Unified Legal Professional Qualification Examination Outline" formulated and published by the Ministry of Justice of the People's Republic of China.

=== Device ===
The Objective Test takes the form of a closed-book, computerized examination. The computerized examination questions, answer requirements, and answer interface are all displayed on the computer display screen. Candidates should use the computer mouse or keyboard to answer directly on the computer answering interface.

The Subjective Test is a computer-based exam. Each candidate’s terminal is equipped with an electronic compilation of laws and regulations. Candidates who find it difficult to take computer exams due to health, age, or other reasons may apply to take the test on paper when they confirm their registration to take the Subjective Test; the test questions and answer requirements are displayed on the computer monitor and the test takers answer on an answer sheet.

For legal examinations held in ethnically autonomous areas, the test can be administered in the primary language of the ethnic minority group.

=== Score ===
The Objective Test consists of two papers - Paper 1 and Paper 2. Each paper has 100 questions and is worth 150 points. There are 50 single-choice questions, worth 1 point each, and a total of 50 multiple-choice and indefinite-choice questions, worth 2 points each. The total score of the two papers is 300 points.

The Subjective Test consists of one paper, which includes case analysis questions, legal document questions, essay questions, and other types of questions. The total score is 180 points.

== See also ==
- All China Lawyers Association
