= Supreme People's Court =

Highest court in the People's Republic of China

Supreme People's Court of the People's Republic of China
- 中华人民共和国最高人民法院
- Supreme People's Court Emblem

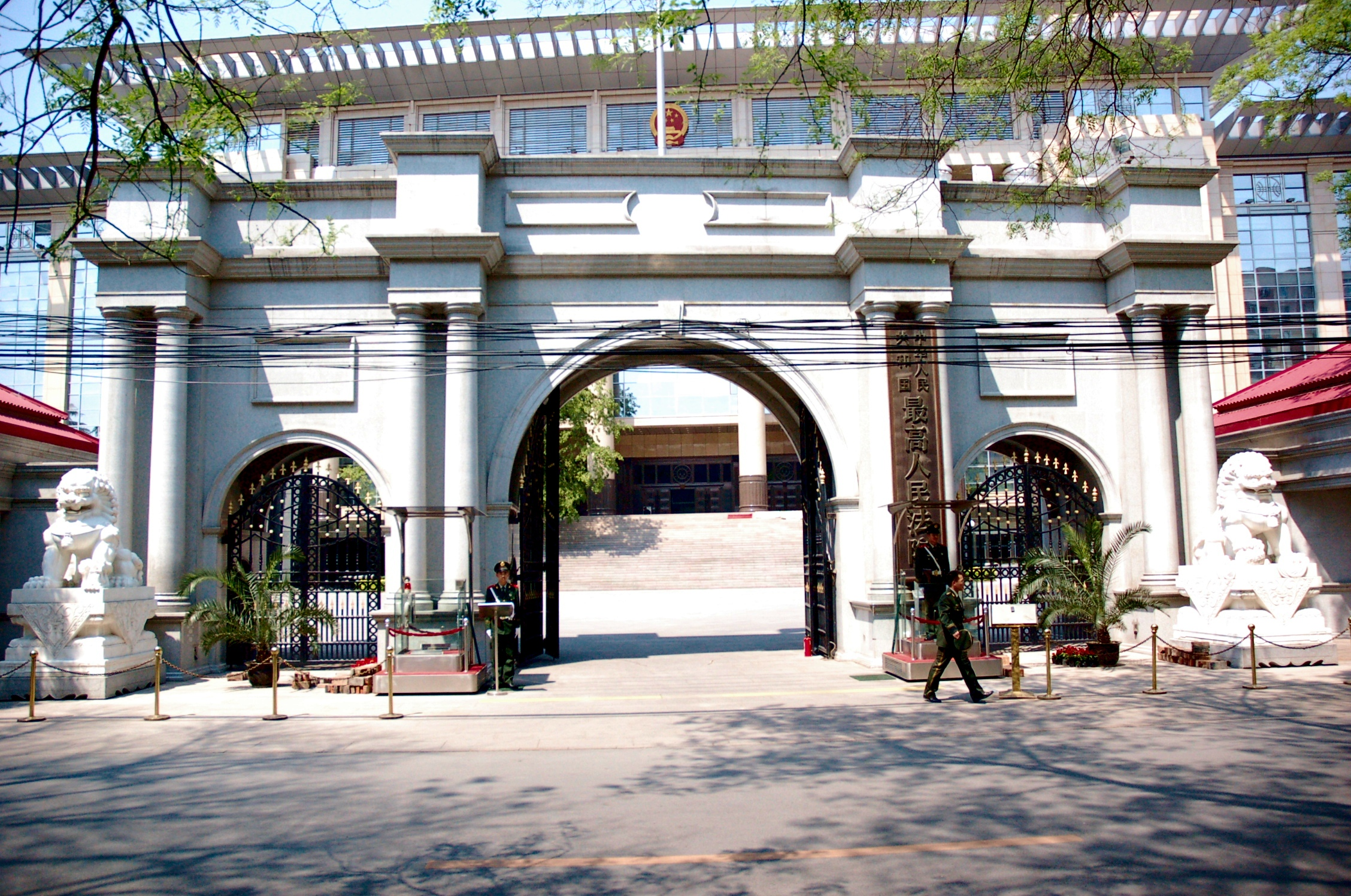
- Main gate
- Interactive map of Supreme People's Court of the People's Republic of China
- 39°54′10.7″N 116°24′18.9″E
- Established: 22 October 1949
- Location: Beijing, China
- Coordinates: 39°54′10.7″N 116°24′18.9″E
- Composition method: Presidential selection with National People's Congress approval
- Authorised by: Constitution of China
- Judge term length: 5 years
- Website: english.court.gov.cn

President and Chief Justice
- Currently: Zhang Jun
- Since: 11 March 2023

Executive Vice President
- Currently: Deng Xiuming
- Since: 5 July 2023

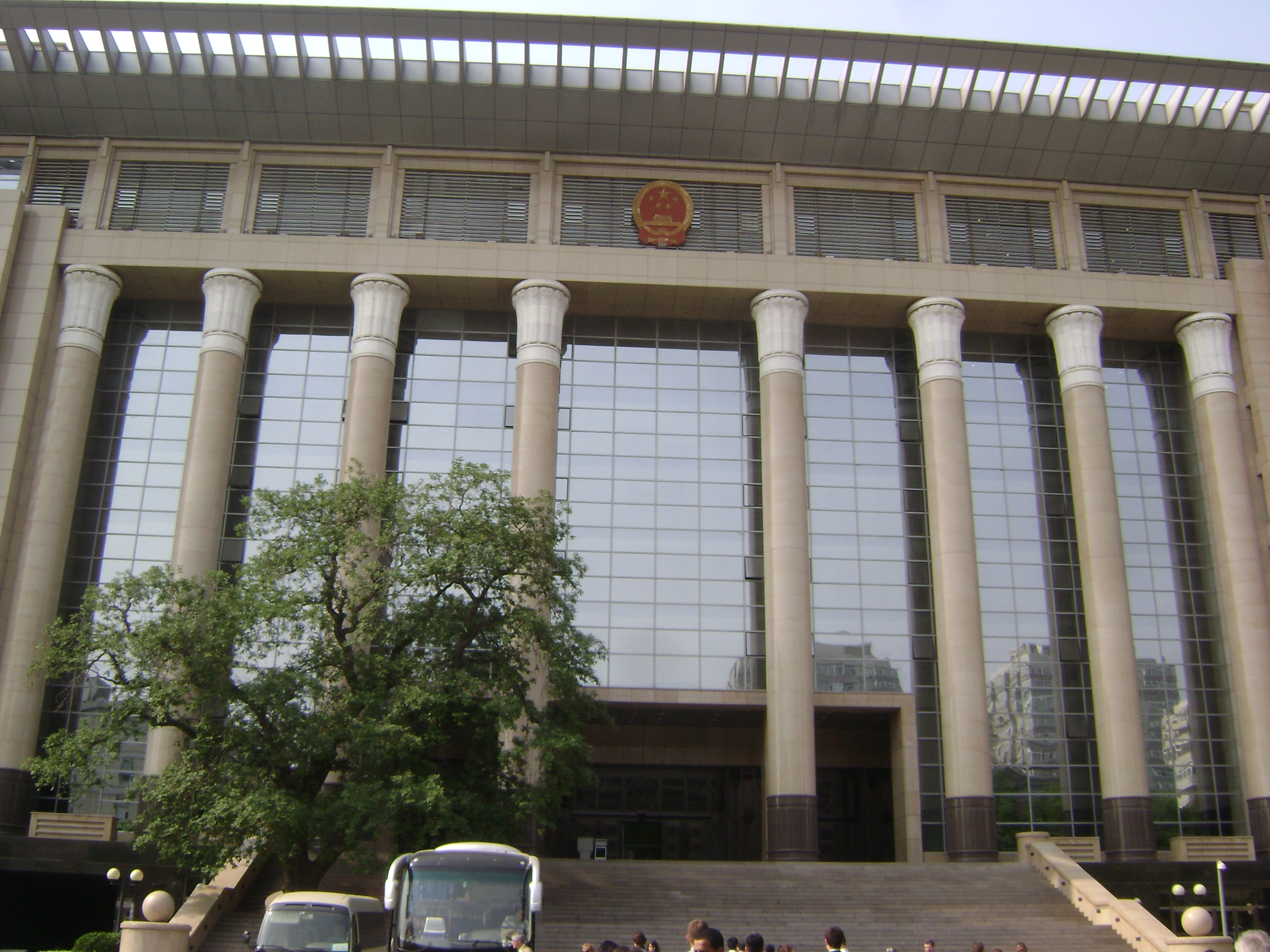
The front facade of the Supreme People's Court in Beijing.

Supreme People's Court
- Simplified Chinese: 中华人民共和国最高人民法院
- Traditional Chinese: 中華人民共和國最高人民法院
Transcriptions
Standard Mandarin
- Hanyu Pinyin: Zhōnghuá rénmín gònghéguó zuìgāo rénmín fǎyuàn
Yue: Cantonese
- Jyutping: zung1waa4 jan4man4 gung6wo4gwok3 zeoi3gou1 jan4man4 faat3jyun2

Commonly abbreviated as
- Simplified Chinese: 最高法院
- Traditional Chinese: 最高法院
Transcriptions
Standard Mandarin
- Hanyu Pinyin: Zuìgāo fǎyuàn
Yue: Cantonese
- Jyutping: zeoi3gou1 faat3jyun2

Further abbreviated as
- Simplified Chinese: 最高院
- Traditional Chinese: 最高院
Transcriptions
Standard Mandarin
- Hanyu Pinyin: Zuìgāo yuàn
Yue: Cantonese
- Jyutping: zeoi3gou1 jyun2

The Supreme People's Court of the People's Republic of China (SPC) is the highest court of the People's Republic of China. It hears appeals of cases from the high people's courts and is the trial court for cases about matters of national importance.

The Supreme People's Court was established in October 1949, and its functions were first outlined in 1954. During the Cultural Revolution, the court was occupied by the People's Liberation Army from 1968 to 1973. During the period of reform and opening up, the court began to focus on legal issues.

According to the country's constitution, the Supreme People's Court is accountable to the National People's Congress. The court has about 400 judges and more than 600 administrative personnel. The court serves as the highest court for the People's Republic of China and also for cases investigated by the Office for Safeguarding National Security in Hong Kong. The special administrative regions of Hong Kong and Macau have separate judicial systems based on British common law traditions and Portuguese civil law traditions respectively, and are out of the jurisdiction of the Supreme People's Court.

== History ==
The Supreme People's Court was established on 22 October 1949 and began operating in November 1950. At least four members of the first court leadership did not come from a legal background, and most of its first staff were assigned from the People's Liberation Army to the Court. The functions of the court was first outlined in the Chinese constitution in its 1954 version, which said the court has the power of independent adjudication and is accountable to the National People's Congress.

During the Cultural Revolution, the 1975 constitution removed the provision that said courts were to decide cases independently and required them to report to revolutionary committees. Most staff members of the court were sent to the countryside, and the People's Liberation Army occupied the court from 1968 to 1973.

Following the end of the Cultural Revolution in 1976, the Supreme People's Court began to focus on legal issues, especially those related to civil and commercial law, because of China's reform and opening up under new leader Deng Xiaoping. The independent power of adjudicate cases returned to the constitution with the 1982 amendment, which explicitly states the courts' right of adjudication cannot be influenced by administrative organs, social organizations and individuals.

In 2005, the Supreme People's Court announced its intent to "[take] back authority for death penalty approval" over concerns about "sentencing quality", and the National People's Congress officially changed the Organic Law on the People's Courts to require all death sentences to be approved by the Supreme People's Court on 31 October 2006. A 2008 report stated that since the new review process, the court has rejected 15 percent of the death sentences decided by lower courts.

As part of an effort to build judicial credibility through more effective enforcement of court orders, the SPC in 2013 promulgated a blacklist composed of Chinese citizens and companies that refuse to comply with court orders (typically court orders to pay a fine or to repay a loan) despite having the ability to do so. As of 2023, the SPC's blacklist is one of its most important enforcement tools and its use has resulted in the recovery of tens of trillions of RMB for fines and delinquent repayments.

In 2015, the Supreme People's Court issued its Opinions on Comprehensively Deepening the Reform of the People's Courts, which detailed measures to restructure the judiciary. These included the Judicial Centralization Reform and the Judicial Accountability Reform, which sought to increase judicial independence from local governments and to reduce influence on lower level judges from higher judicial authorities.

On 1 January 2019, the Intellectual Property Tribunal of the Supreme People's Court was established to handle all second instance hearings from cases heard in the first instance by the Intellectual Property Courts.

== Functions ==
According to the country's constitution, the Supreme People's Court is accountable to the National People's Congress. It is also subservient to the Chinese Communist Party (CCP). The court has about 400 judges and more than 600 administrative personnel.

=== Adjudication ===
The Supreme People's Court exercises its original jurisdiction over cases placed with the court by laws and regulations and those the court deems within its jurisdiction. It is generally selective in the matters it hears, focusing on those with the potential to impact future similar cases. It also reviews appeals or protests against trial decisions or verdicts of high people's courts and special people's courts, as well as appeals against court judgments lodged by the Supreme People's Procuratorate according to trial supervision procedures. When the court has discovered errors in the rulings and verdicts of lower courts that are already enforced, it investigates or appoints a lower court to rehear the case.

The court also approves death sentences and suspended death sentences handed down by lower courts. It also approves verdicts on crimes not specifically stipulated in the criminal law.

=== Legal interpretation ===
The court explains the application of laws in specific cases during a trial. Further details about this were described by Zhou Qiang as:

The reply is a request for a specific case. Its legal binding force is limited to the case itself and does not have universal legal effect. In other cases, the judge cannot directly use the above reply as the basis for the judgment. For documents that have universal effectiveness and guide courts at all levels, the Supreme People's Court generally publishes it in the form of judicial interpretation and can make inquiries in newspapers and on the Internet.

While the Chinese constitution does not state that courts have the power to review laws for their constitutionality (see constitutional review), the Supreme People's Court can request the Standing Committee of the National People's Congress to evaluate whether an administrative rule, local regulation, autonomous regulation or separate regulation contravenes the constitution or a national law. However, the Supreme People's Court has never made such request.

=== Supervision of lower courts ===
The Supreme People's Court is also responsible for supervising the adjudication of lower courts and specialized courts.

== Organization ==
Divisions within the Supreme People's Court

- Case-Filing Division
- Criminal Divisions (5)
- Civil Divisions (4)
- Environment and Resources Division
- Administrative Division
- Judicial Supervision Division

Departments within the Supreme People's Court

- State Compensation Division
- Enforcement Department (Enforcement Command Center)
- General Office
- Political Department
- Research office
- Adjudication Management Office
- Discipline and Supervision Department
- International Cooperation Department
- Judicial Administration and Equipment Management Department
- Party-Related Affairs Department
- Retirees' Affairs Department
- Information Department

Circuit and other courts of the Supreme People's Court

1. First Circuit (established in Shenzhen, December 2014)
2. Second Circuit (established in Shenyang, December 2014)
3. Third Circuit
4. Fourth Circuit
5. Fifth Circuit
6. Sixth Circuit
7. First International Commercial
8. Second International Commercial
9. Intellectual Property Court

== President/Chief Justices and Vice Presidents of the Court ==
1. 1949–1954: Supreme People's Court of the Central People's Government
  - President: Shen Junru
2. 1954–1959: Supreme People's Court of the People's Republic of China under the 1st National People's Congress
  - President: Dong Biwu
  - Vice Presidents: Gao Kelin, Ma Xiwu, Zhang Zhirang
3. 1959–1965: 2nd National People's Congress
  - President: Xie Juezai
  - Vice Presidents: Wu Defeng, Wang Weigang, Zhang Zhirang
4. 1965–1975: 3rd National People's Congress
  - President: Yang Xiufeng
  - Vice Presidents: Tan Guansan, Wang Weigang, Zeng Hanzhou, He Lanjie, Xing Yimin, Wang Demao, Zhang Zhirang
5. 1975–1978: 4th National People's Congress
  - President: Jiang Hua
  - Vice Presidents: Wang Weigang, Zeng Hanzhou, He Lanjie, Zheng Shaowen
6. 1978–1983: 5th National People's Congress
  - President: Jiang Hua
  - Vice Presidents: Zeng Hanzhou, He Lanjie, Zheng Shaowen, Song Guang, Wang Huaian, Wang Zhanping
7. 1983–1988: 6th National People's Congress
  - President: Zheng Tianxiang
  - Vice Presidents: Ren Jianxin, Song Guang, Wang Huaian, Wang Zhanping, Lin Huai, Zhu Mingshan, Ma Yuan
8. 1988–1993: 7th National People's Congress
  - President: Ren Jianxin
  - Vice Presidents: Hua Liankui, Lin Huai, Zhu Mingshan, Ma Yuan, Duan Muzheng
9. 1993–1998: 8th National People's Congress
  - President: Ren Jianxin
  - Vice Presidents: Zhu Mingshan, Xie Anshan, Gao Changli, Tang Dehua, Liu Jiachen, Luo Haocai, Li Guoguang, Lin Huai, Hua Liankui, Duan Muzheng, Wang Jingrong, Ma Yuan
10. 1998–2003: 9th National People's Congress
  - President: Xiao Yang
  - Vice Presidents: Zhu Mingshan, Li Guoguang, Jiang Xingchang, Shen Deyong, Wan Exiang, Cao Jianming, Zhang Jun, Huang Songyou, Jiang Bixin
11. 2003–2007: 10th National People's Congress
  - President: Xiao Yang
  - Vice Presidents: Cao Jianming, Jiang Xingchang, Shen Deyong, Wan Exiang, Huang Songyou, Su Zelin, Xi Xiaoming, Zhang Jun, Xiong Xuanguo
12. 2008–2013: 11th National People's Congress
  - President: Wang Shengjun
  - Vice Presidents: Shen Deyong (Executive), Zhang Jun, Wan Exiang, Jiang Bixin, Su Zelin, Xi Xiaoming, Nan Ying, Jing Hanchao, Huang Ermei
13. 2013–2018: 12th National People's Congress
  - President: Zhou Qiang
14. 2018—2023: 13th National People's Congress
  - President: Zhou Qiang
  - Vice Presidents: He Rong (Executive), Jiang Wei, Tao Kaiyuan, Gao Jinghong, Yang Wanming, Yang Linping, He Xiaorong, Shen Liang
15. 2023—present: 14th National People's Congress
  - President: Zhang Jun

== See also ==
- Judicial system of China
- Supreme People's Procuratorate – China's highest prosecutor's office
- Three Supremes
