= Beijing High People's Court =

Court in Beijing, China

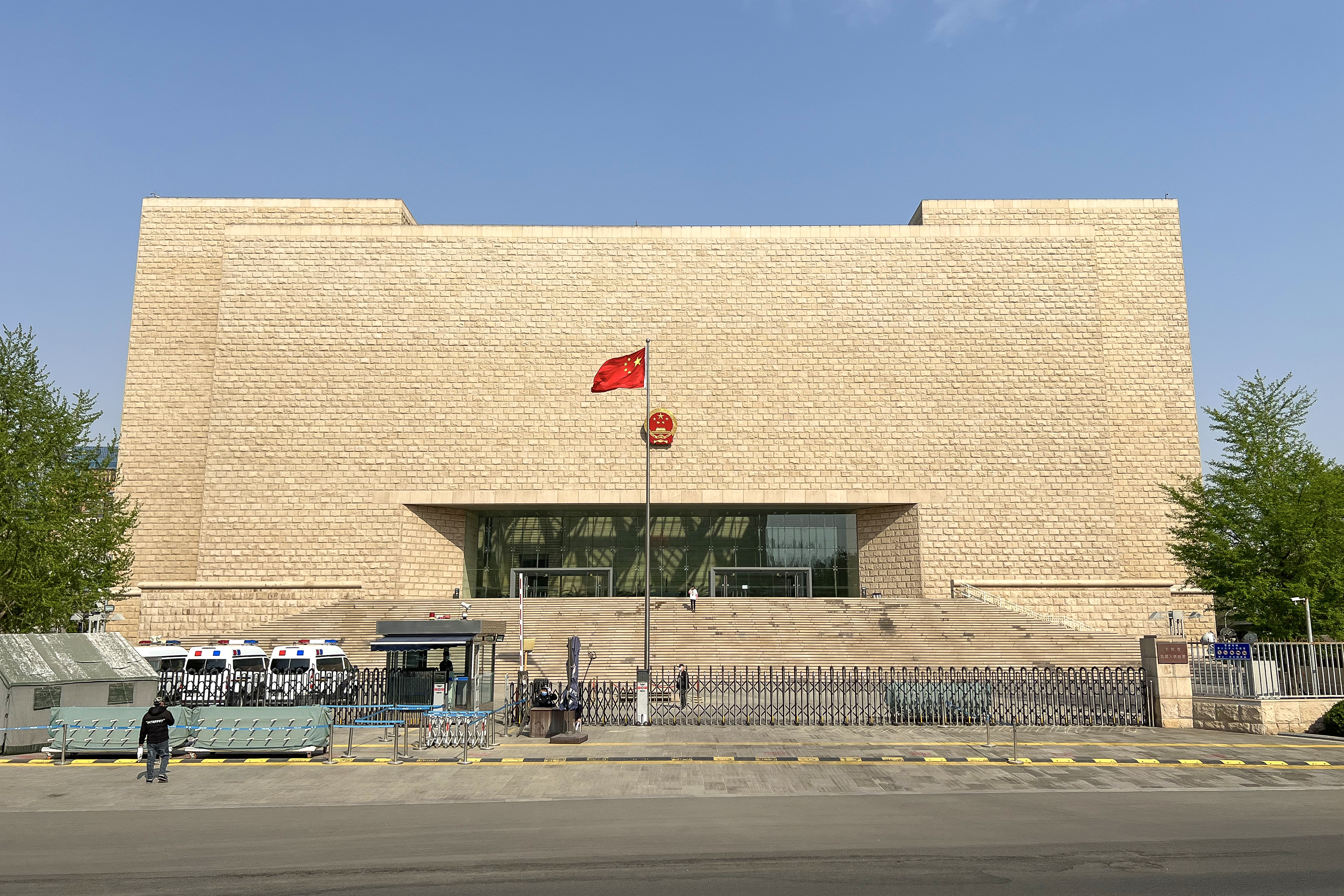
High People's Court of Beijing Municipality

The Beijing High People's Court, officially called High People's Court of Beijing Municipality, is the high people's court for Beijing, China.

== Area of authority ==
The Beijing High People's Court has authority over Beijing municipality, as well as the Beijing Railway Bureau.

== Presidents ==
- Chi Qiang (January 2008 to January 2013)
- Ge Ping (January 2013 to January 2016)
- Yang Wanming (January 2016 to present)
