= Tang Yijun =

Chinese politician (born 1961)

- 唐一军

Chairman of the Jiangxi Provincial Committee of the Chinese People's Political Consultative Conference
- In office 14 January 2023 – 29 May 2024
- Preceded by: Yao Zengke
- Succeeded by: Song Fulong

Minister of Justice
- In office 29 April 2020 – 24 February 2023
- Premier: Li Keqiang
- Preceded by: Fu Zhenghua
- Succeeded by: He Rong

Governor of Liaoning
- In office 30 October 2017 – 11 May 2020
- Preceded by: Chen Qiufa
- Succeeded by: Liu Ning

Deputy Party Secretary of Zhejiang
- In office May 2017 – October 2017
- Preceded by: Yuan Jiajun
- Succeeded by: Zheng Shanjie

Party Secretary of Ningbo
- In office 24 August 2016 – 28 October 2017
- Preceded by: Liu Qi
- Succeeded by: Zheng Shanjie

Personal details
- Born: March 1961 (age 65) Ju County, Shandong, China
- Party: Chinese Communist Party (1985–2024; expelled)
- Education: Zhejiang Provincial Party School; Central Party School

Chinese name
- Traditional Chinese: 唐一軍
- Simplified Chinese: 唐一军
Transcriptions
Standard Mandarin
- Hanyu Pinyin: Táng Yījūn

Tang Yijun (Chinese: 唐一军; pinyin: Táng Yījūn; born March 1961) is a Chinese politician who has been under an anti-corruption investigation by the Central Commission for Discipline Inspection and the National Supervisory Commission since April 2024.

Previously, he served as chairman of the CPPCC Jiangxi Provincial Committee from 2023 to 2024, the 12th Minister of Justice of China from 2020 to 2023, governor of Liaoning Province from 2017 to 2020, and party secretary of Ningbo City from 2016 to 2017.

== Career ==
Tang is considered native to Ju County, Shandong, but spent most of his life in Zhejiang. He joined the workforce in July 1977, working for communes in Qingtian County, Yongkang County, and Lishui County, shortly after the death of Mao. Between 1980 and 1984, shortly after economic reforms began, Tang was a clerical worker at the Lishui party school. From September 1984 to July 1986, he studied political economics in the theoretical undergraduate program of the Zhejiang Provincial Party School. He was assigned work in the theory division of publicity department of Zhejiang Provincial Party Committee.

In October 1985, Tang joined the Chinese Communist Party. In 1991, Tang began working for the General Office of the Zhejiang party committee under Li Zemin. In July 1997, he became secretary-general of the Zhoushan party organization. In June 2002, he was named secretary-general of the Zhejiang Commission for Discipline Inspection. From September 2003 to July 2006, he studied economics and management in the on-the-job graduate program of the Correspondence College of the Central Party School. In June 2005, he was named deputy party chief and Discipline Inspection secretary of Ningbo. In February 2010, he became the chief of the Political and Legal Affairs Commission of Ningbo. In February 2011, he was named chairman of the Ningbo People's Political Consultative Conference.

In May 2016, Tang became acting mayor of Ningbo. In August 2016, he became Communist Party Secretary of Ningbo and a member of the Zhejiang provincial party standing committee. In May 2017, Tang was named deputy party chief of Zhejiang province. He served in the role for five months before being appointed as acting governor of Liaoning in October 2017.

On 29 April 2020, he was appointed Minister of Justice, succeeding Fu Zhenghua. Despite being a minister, he failed to become a member of the CCP Central Committee after the 20th CCP National Congress in October 2022.

Tang was elected as chairman of the Jiangxi Provincial Committee of the Chinese People's Political Consultative Conference on 14 January 2023. Succeeded by executive vice president of the Supreme People's Court He Rong, Tang was removed from the office of Minister of Justice of China on 24 February 2023.

=== Downfall ===
On 2 April 2024, Tang was suspected of "serious violations of laws and regulations" by the Central Commission for Discipline Inspection (CCDI), the party's internal disciplinary body, and the National Supervisory Commission, the highest anti-corruption agency of China. The Chairman's Meeting of the 14th National Committee of the CPPCC approved of a decision to expel Tang from the CPPCC National Committee on 29 April. On 29 May, he was removed as the chairman of the Jiangxi Provincial Committee of the CPPCC. He was expelled from the CPPCC National Committee on 6 June. Tang was expelled from the Communist Party, dismissed from public office and removed as a delegate to the 20th CCP National Congress on 7 October 2024.

On 2 February 2026, Tang was sentenced to life imprisonment for bribery in 137 million yuan.

Assembly seats
Preceded by Wang Zhuohui	Chairman of the Ningbo Municipal Committee of the Chinese People's Political Consultative Conference; 2011–2016	Succeeded by Yang Xubiao
Preceded by Yao Zengke	Chairman of the Jiangxi Provincial Committee of the Chinese People's Political Consultative Conference; 2023–2024	Succeeded by Song Fulong
Government offices
Preceded by Lu Ziyue	Mayor of Ningbo; 2016–2017	Succeeded by Qiu Dongyao
Previous: Fu Zhenghua	Minister of Justice; 2020–2023	Next: He Rong
Preceded by Chen Qiufa	Governor of Liaoning; 2017–2020	Next: Liu Ning
Party political offices
Preceded by Liu Qi	Communist Party Secretary of Ningbo; 2016–2017	Succeeded by Zheng Shanjie
Preceded by Yuan Jiajun	Deputy Communist Party Secretary of Zhejiang; 2017-2017	Succeeded by Zheng Shanjie
