= He Rong =

Chinese jurist

- 贺荣
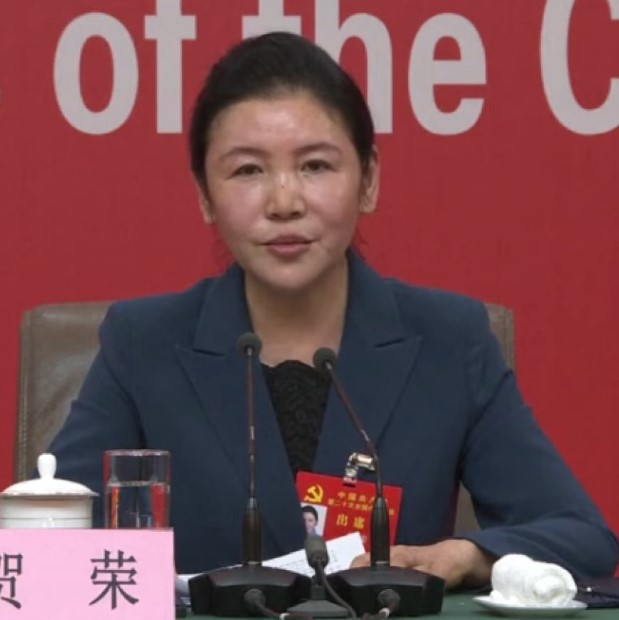
- He in 2022

Minister of Justice
- Incumbent
- Assumed office 24 February 2023
- Premier: Li Keqiang; Li Qiang
- Preceded by: Tang Yijun

Personal details
- Born: 12 October 1962 (age 63) Linyi County, Shandong, China
- Party: Chinese Communist Party
- Education: China University of Political Science and Law (LLB, LLD); University of Technology Sydney (LLM)

He Rong (Chinese: 贺荣; pinyin: Hè Róng; born 12 October 1962) is a Chinese jurist and politician who has been serving as the 13th Minister of Justice of China since February 2023. She previously served as executive vice president of the Supreme People's Court of China from 2020 to 2023 and deputy party secretary of Shaanxi province from 2018 to 2020.

== Early life and education ==
He Rong was born in Linyi County, Dezhou, Shandong, China.

He Rong received a Bachelor of Law with a major in economic law from the China University of Political Science and Law in 1984, a Master of Laws in civil and commercial law from the University of Technology Sydney in 2004, and a Doctor of Law in procedural law from the China University of Political Science and Law in 2006.

== Career ==
She joined the Chinese Communist Party in June 1984. A law school graduate, she joined the Beijing Municipal Higher People's Court in August 1984 as an assistant judge of the court's First Criminal Tribunal and a clerk of its Research Office. She then worked at the Higher People's Court as a tribunal clerk, assistant judge, researcher, judge, director of the research office, and member of the court's judicial committee until July 2001.

She served as deputy president of the Beijing Municipal Higher People's Court from 2001 to 2007, president of the Beijing Municipal Second Intermediate People's Court from 2007 to 2010, and deputy president and deputy party secretary of the Beijing Municipal Higher People's Court from 2010 to 2011.

In December 2011, she began serving on the Supreme People's Court as part of the court jury. She served as vice president of the Supreme People's Court from 2013 to 2017. In March 2017, He was named a member of the Shaanxi provincial party standing committee and then in March 2018, she was named deputy party secretary of Shaanxi province. He returned to Beijing in 2020 and served as executive vice president of the Supreme People's Court from 2020 to 2023.

In February 2023, succeeding Tang Yijun, He was appointed as the Minister of Justice of China by the Standing Committee of the National People's Congress.

Party political offices
Preceded by Guo Yongping	Secretary of Shaanxi Discipline Inspection Committee; 2017–2018	Succeeded by Wang Xingning
Preceded by Mao Wanchun	Deputy Communist Party Secretary of Shaanxi; 2018–2020	Succeeded by Hu Henghua
Government offices
New title	Director of Shaanxi Provincial Supervision Commission; 2018	Succeeded by Wang Xingning
Preceded by Tang Yijun	Minister of Justice; 2023–present	Incumbent
Legal offices
Preceded by Shen Deyong	Executive Vice President of the Supreme People's Court; 2020–2023	Succeeded by Deng Xiuming
