= Xu Lingyi =

Chinese politician (born 1958)

- 徐令义

Deputy Director of the National Supervisory Commission
- Incumbent
- Assumed office 21 March 2018
- Director: Yang Xiaodu

Deputy Secretary of the Central Commission for Discipline Inspection
- Incumbent
- Assumed office October 2017
- Secretary: Zhao Leji

Personal details
- Born: 12 April 1958 (age 68) Quzhou, Zhejiang, China
- Party: Chinese Communist Party
- Education: Wenzhou University; Central Party School of the Chinese Communist Party

Chinese name
- Traditional Chinese: 徐令義
- Simplified Chinese: 徐令义
Transcriptions
Standard Mandarin
- Hanyu Pinyin: Xú Lìngyì

Xu Lingyi (Chinese: 徐令义; born 12 April 1958) is a Chinese politician and the current deputy secretary of the Central Commission for Discipline Inspection and deputy director of the National Supervisory Commission.

== Biography ==
Xu was born in Quzhou, Zhejiang in April 1958. At the end of the Cultural Revolution, he was conscripted into military service in March 1976. He taught at a middle school in Chetang Township of his hometown shortly before going to study at Wenzhou Normal College (now Wenzhou University) in September 1981.

After college, he was assigned to the Publicity Department of CCP Wenzhou Municipal Committee, where he was deputy secretary-general and office director between November 1991 and July 1994. In July 1994 he was transferred to Yongjia County as Communist Party Secretary, the top political position in the county. In June 1997 he was promoted to become Communist Party Secretary of Leqing and chairman of Standing Committee of the Municipal People's Congress, and held that offices until August 2001. In August 2001 he was promoted again to become deputy director of Publicity Department of CCP Zhejiang Provincial Committee and director of Provincial Civilization Office. He was deputy secretary-seneral of CCP Zhejiang Provincial Committee and director of Zhejiang Provincial Letters and Complaints Bureau from August 2005 to August 2008.

In August 2008 he was transferred to Beijing, capital of China, and was appointed deputy director of the State Bureau for Letters and Calls. In January 2014 he became deputy director of the CCP Central Committee on Spiritual Civilization Construction, but having held the position for only one year. In March 2015 he was assigned to the Central Commission for Discipline Inspection, the Communist Party's top internal disciplinary body, where he was appointed its deputy secretary in October 2017. In March 2018 he concurrently served as deputy director of the National Supervisory Commission, the highest anti-corruption agency of China. On July 30, 2018, he was sent to Xi'an, capital of northwest China's Shaanxi province, to deal with illegal construction in Qinling Mountains.
