= Qin Huohuo =

Chinese internet hoaxer (born 1983)

- 秦火火
- Born: Qin Zhihui (秦志晖); December 1983 (age 42); Hengnan County, Hunan, China
- Education: High School
- Occupation: Network push hand
- Years active: 2012-2013
- Organization(s): Beijing Erma Interactive Marketing and Planning Co., Ltd. (北京尔玛互动营销策划有限公司)
- Criminal charges: Defamation, Rogue
- Criminal penalty: Sentenced to 3 years

Qin Zhihui (Chinese: 秦志晖, born December 1983), also known under the pseudonym Qin Huohuo (Chinese: 秦火火; lit. 'Fire Fire Qin'), is an internet celebrity infamous as a rumormonger. He has been accused of fabricating and spreading rumors online via the Sina Weibo microblogging website, and is the first person to appear in court on rumormongering charges since the Ministry of Public Security vowed to target those who spread online rumors in August 2013.

== Biography ==
Qin Zhihui was born in Hengnan County, in Hunan, China. After high school, he went to work in Guangzhou. He was a text checker in Northern China, then moved back to Hunan to study in 2004. In 2005, he went to Beijing to work for Huayi Baichuang (华艺百创公司). He joined brand management company Erma (尔玛中国) in 2010 and left in 2011.

== Creating rumors ==
Qin was found guilty of spreading rumors about several celebrities including popular television hostess Yang Lan, as well as China's former Ministry of Railways, via Sina Weibo, China's Twitter-like service, from 2012 to 2013. Prosecutors said that Qin's widely spread posts included one claiming that Beijing had granted 30 million euros (41 million U.S. dollars) in compensation to a foreigner who died in a train crash in east China's Zhejiang Province in 2011. The rumor was reposted 11,000 times and commented on 3,300 times, with Qin's fabrication inciting anger over apparent disparities in how foreigners and Chinese were compensated after the accident.

According to officials, Qin created and reposted rumors 3,000 times on Sina Weibo. The important rumors are:

1. Wenzhou train collision: The weibo is "After just got the news, Railway Ministry has train accident victims in Italy Sissy agreement compensation thirty million euros (equivalent to nearly 200 million yuan), it is the Ministry of Railways with reference to European law provisions relating to personal accident, had to agree to the compensation agreement. If this is true compensation agreement, will create China's foreign personal accident up to record." (刚得到消息，铁道部已向动车事故中意大利遇难者茜茜协议赔偿三千万欧元（折合人民币接近两亿），据悉，这是铁道部参照欧洲法律中有关人身意外伤害条款后，不得不同意此赔偿协议。若此赔偿协议属实，将开创中国对外个人意外最高赔偿纪录。)
2. Make Lei Feng luxury life: The weibo is "Lei Feng in 1959 for his purchase of a leather jacket, wool pants, black shoes and so full of high-end line head, leather jacket, wool pants, shoes, then add about 90 yuan, while Lei's wage was only six yuan a month." (雷锋1959年为自己添置的皮夹克、毛料裤、黑皮鞋等全套高档行头，皮夹克、毛料裤、皮鞋加起来当时在90元左右，而当时雷锋一个月才六块钱。)
3. Hype Guo Meimei incident (郭美美事件)
4. Created rumor about donation by Red Cross.
5. Created rumor about Zhang Haidi (张海迪) has Japanese Citizenship. The weibo is "Once a generation idol Zhang Haidi, please answer the following several questions: Why was your sister renamed Zhang Nuowei? Billionaire, Shandong Ruisen Construction Engineering Co., Ltd. Chairman Zhang Nuowei, has Chinese nationality? Ruisen whether to undertake projects about CDPF? Please use facts to prove you are not supercilious look wolf, then we do not want to love the results kept a supercilious look wolf." (曾经的一代偶像张海迪，请你回答以下这几个问题：你的妹妹张海燕为何更名叫张挪威？亿万富翁、山东瑞森建筑工程有限公司董事长张挪威，还是中国国籍吗？山东瑞森建筑工程有限公司是否承接过残联的工程项目？请用事实证明你们不是白眼狼，我们不想当年的爱心结果养了一头白眼狼。)
6. Created rumor about Luo Yuan and Kong Qingdong.

On August 19, 2013, police searched the Erma Company, and Qin was arrested on the same day.

== Trial ==
On April 11, 2014, Beijing Chaoyang People's Court heard Qin's cases.

Three days later, the court found him guilty on defamation and rogue, sentencing him to 3 years in jail on defamation charges and another year for affray. The court held that Qin's actions impacted society and seriously harmed social order, but said it used leniency in the sentence taking into consideration his attitude in confessing truthfully about what he did.

Qin has been released from prison in June 2016 after his 3-year sentence expired.

== See also ==
- Charles Xue
- Internet censorship in China
