= National security of China =

China's national security

The national security of the People's Republic of China is the coordination of a variety of organizations, including law enforcement, military, paramilitary, governmental, and intelligence agencies that aim to ensure country's national security.

== Conceptual development ==
The Chinese Communist Party (CCP) and its military strategists in the People's Liberation Army (PLA) have often viewed national security through a fear and avoidance of encirclement, and have viewed the first island chain as part of a cordon sanitaire by the U.S. and its allies to surround the country and limit its strategic depth and maritime security.

Until 1961, the PLA focused on planning for the possibility of a United States ground incursion which leadership theorized could come through the Korean Peninsula, Taiwan, or Vietnam. Chinese leadership assumed that a US incursion would also include US attempts to bomb Chinese cities with nuclear weapons.

Anticipating risks of US or Soviet invasions, China launched the Third Front campaign to enhance its strategic depth by developing industrial and military facilities in the country's interior, where it would be less vulnerable to attack.

The Sino-Soviet border clashes and the concentration of Soviet military forces near the border between the two countries meant that after 1969, Chinese leadership viewed a Soviet incursion as China's biggest security threat.

=== Xi Jinping ===
General Secretary of the Chinese Communist Party Xi Jinping has devoted a large amount of work towards national security, introducing the holistic security concept in 2014, which he defined as taking "the security of the people as compass, political security as its roots, economic security as its pillar, military security, cultural security, and cultural security as its protections, and that relies on the promotion of international security." The holistic security concept also emphasizes the need for energy security. Xi called for a holistic national security architecture that encompasses "all aspects of the work of the party and the country." Xi created CCP's National Security Commission (NSC), which focuses on holistic security and addresses both external and internal security matters. Since its establishment, the NSC has been chaired by CCP General Secretary Xi Jinping. Since its creation by Xi, the National Security Commission has established local security committees, focusing on dissent.

Xi has championed the Fengqiao experience, calling on officials to contain and resolve conflicts at the grassroots level without needing to involve higher legal bodies. Xi's government has passed numerous laws including the Counterespionage Law in 2014, the National Security Law and the Counterterrorism Law in 2015, the Cybersecurity Law and the Law on Administration of Foreign NGOs' Activities within China in 2016, the National Intelligence Law in 2017, and the Data Security Law in 2021. With regard to Chinese abroad, China's 2015 National Security Law states that China will take necessary measures to protect the security and interests "of Chinese citizens, organizations, and bodies abroad." Under Xi, China's mass surveillance network has dramatically grown, with comprehensive profiles being built for each citizen. Grid-style social management, which involves subdividing China's counties into smaller zones, and assigning each zone to a person that reports all activity to the local government on a regular basis, has risen in prominence under Xi. Public security spending has increased significantly under Xi, reaching $210 billion in 2020, more than double from the decade prior; this was accompanied by a significant decrease in crime. Xi's leadership has also seen a more prominent role taken by the Ministry of State Security, which expanded its public profile.

At the 2022 meeting of Boao Forum for Asia, Xi proposed the Global Security Initiative. It identifies six commitments: (1) common, comprehensive, cooperative, and sustainable security; (2) respect for sovereignty and territorial integrity of all countries; (3) abiding by the purpose and principles of the UN Charter; (4) taking the security concerns of all countries seriously; (5) peacefully resolving disputes between countries through dialogue; and (6) maintaining security in both traditional and non-traditional fields. The principles outlined by the Global Security Initiative are long-standing elements of China's security policy. As of 2023, articulations of the Global Security Initiative have primarily focused on broad principles and included little operational detail.

== Concepts ==
Per the 2015 National Security Law, national security "refers to the relative absence of international or domestic threats to the state's power to govern, sovereignty, unity and territorial integrity, the welfare of the people, sustainable economic and social development and other major national interests, and the ability to ensure a continued state of security". It further specifies that the "state persists in the leadership of the Chinese Communist Party".

Cultural security refers to protecting Chinese society from "cultural infiltration by hegemonic powers, Westernization and cultural decay". It is intertwined with ideological security, which involves threats such as "Western-style democracy, Western cultural hegemony, the diversified dissemination of Internet information and public opinion, and religious infiltration". Food security refers to food self-sufficiency. Human security in China refers to the security of the collective humankind.

== Armed forces overview ==
The armed forces of China are composed of the People's Liberation Army (PLA), the People's Armed Police (PAP), the reserves, and the militia. The PLA has four services: the Army, Navy, Air Force, and Rocket Force; the Rocket Force is responsible for land-based nuclear and conventional missiles. The paramilitary PAP performs internal and - in wartime - rear-area security missions; it also controls the China Coast Guard.

The Chinese Communist Party (CCP) Central Military Commission (CMC) is responsible for creating PLA policy. The CMC is led by the Chairman, who serves as the commander-in-chief of the PLA. The commission has two to three vice chairmen, each of whom is a general in the PLA ground forces, and seven other members representing other various branches of the PLA. Operational control of the PLA is administered by the CCP Central Military Commission and the Ministry of National Defense. The PLA headquarters are categorized into four departments: General Staff Department, General Political Department, General Logistics Department and General Armaments Department.

In 2005, China announced that it had downsized its military by 200,000 troops in order to optimize force structures and increase combat capabilities. The number of active-duty soldiers decreased to 2.3 million from as high as 3.2 million in 1987. The changes included eliminating layers in the command hierarchy, reducing non-combat units, such as schools and farms, and reprogramming officer duties. The ground forces were reduced in numbers, while the navy, air force, and rocket forces were strengthened. Reservists number an estimated 500,000 to 600,000 and paramilitary forces in the PAP number an estimated 1.5 million.

The Central Military Commission of the People's Republic of China is differentiated from the Central Military Commission of the CCP. According to Article 93 of the state constitution, the CMC directs the armed forces of the country and is composed of a chairman, vice chairmen, and members whose terms run concurrently with the National People's Congress. The commission is responsible to the National People's Congress and its Standing Committee.

=== Defense budget ===
Military expenditure of China, Russia and U.S. in constant 2021 US$ billions

The military budget of the People's Republic of China is the portion of the overall government budget that is allocated for the funding of the People's Liberation Army. This military budget finances employee salaries and training costs, the maintenance of equipment and facilities, support of new or ongoing operations, and development and procurement of new weapons, equipment, and vehicles. Every March, as part of its annual state budget, China releases a single overall figure for national military expenditures. As of 2026, the official military budget was announced to be 1.90 trillion yuan (US$277 billion), the second largest in the world behind the US.

=== Paramilitary forces ===
The paramilitary forces of the People's Republic of China are the military units and formations apart from the People's Liberation Army, the principal military force of the People's Republic of China. They are composed of three main forces, the People's Liberation Army Reserve Force, the People's Armed Police (PAP), and the Militia, and they act as auxiliaries to the active forces of the People's Liberation Army. They generally perform a wide range of roles.

== Police and internal security ==
China's internal security apparatus is made up of the Ministry of State Security (MSS) and the Ministry of Public Security (MPS), the PAP, the PLA, and the state judicial, procuratorial, and penal systems. The Ministry of Public Security oversees all domestic police activity in China. The ministry is responsible for police operations and has dedicated departments for internal political, economic, and communications security. Its lowest organizational units are public security stations, which maintain close day-to-day contact with the public. The PAP, which sustains an estimated total strength of 1.5 million personnel, is organized into 45 divisions: internal security police, border defense personnel, guards for government buildings and embassies, and police communications specialists.

The Ministry of State Security was established in 1983 to ensure "the security of the state through effective measures against enemy agents, spies, and counterrevolutionary activities designed to sabotage or overthrow China's socialist system." The ministry is guided by a series of laws enacted in 1993, 1994, and 1997 that replaced the "counter-revolutionary" crime statutes. The ministry's operations include intelligence collection, both domestic and foreign.

China has developed an efficient, well-funded internal security apparatus which is tasked with stability maintenance, or "weiwen". According to a study conducted by Tsinghua University, based on published police budgets, $77 billion, (514 billion yuan) was appropriated for internal security in 2009, a budget item which is rapidly increasing.

== Hong Kong ==
The Hong Kong Special Administrative Region is considered a part of China, so it has a responsibility to protect national security of China. In Hong Kong, national security law (to fulfill Hong Kong Basic Law Article 23) has not been passed yet. It was attempted in 2003 but withdrawn due to mass demonstrations. Since the major social movements in 2014 and 2019–20, the Central Government of China has had concerns about national security, and has highlighted foreign forces interfering in domestic affairs. The Chinese Government has pressured Hong Kong to enact national security laws many times. Since some Hong Kong legislators refuse to pass any bills related to China, it is unlikely that a national security law will be passed in the foreseeable future. To block the national security loophole in Hong Kong, in 2020, China's National People's Congress passed a National Security Law for Hong Kong which bypasses Hong Kong's local legislation.

== Macau ==
A Macau national security law was passed in 2009.

== See also ==
- Law enforcement in China
- Public safety network
