= General secretaryship of Xi Jinping =

Historical period of China since 2012

New Era of Socialism with Chinese Characteristics
- 2012–present
History of China (2002–2012)
- Xi Jinping in 2026
- Location: People's Republic of China
- CCP General Secretary (Paramount leader): Xi Jinping
- President(s): Hu Jintao; Xi Jinping
- Prime Minister(s): Wen Jiabao; Li Keqiang; Li Qiang
- Key events: Anti-corruption campaign Battle against poverty China–United States trade war 2019–2020 Hong Kong protests COVID-19 pandemic 2022 Winter Olympics

Since 2012, the People's Republic of China has officially referred to its present era as the New Era of Socialism with Chinese Characteristics, which started when Xi Jinping succeeded Hu Jintao as general secretary of the Chinese Communist Party (CCP) following the 18th National Congress of the Chinese Communist Party. In 2016, Xi was proclaimed the CCP's fourth leadership core, following Mao Zedong, Deng Xiaoping, and Jiang Zemin.

While overseeing China's domestic policy, Xi has introduced far-ranging measures to enforce party discipline and strengthen internal unity. His anti-corruption campaign led to the downfall of prominent incumbent and retired CCP officials, including former PSC member Zhou Yongkang. For the sake of promoting "common prosperity", Under Xi, China has enacted a series of policies designed to increase equality, overseen targeted poverty alleviation programs as part of the battle against poverty, and directed a broad crackdown in 2021 against the tech sector, as well as drastically curtailing the tutoring industry and reducing homework burdens. Furthermore, China has expanded support for state-owned enterprises (SOEs), emphasized advanced manufacturing and tech development, advanced military-civil fusion, and attempted to reform the country's property sector. Following the onset of the COVID-19 pandemic in mainland China, the country initially responded with a zero-COVID policy from January 2020 to December 2022 before ultimately shifting towards a mitigation strategy after widespread protests occurred. In foreign policy, Xi emphasizes the Community of Common Destiny. He seeks to increase China's ability to shape international norms in emerging policy areas (described as "new frontiers") like space and the internet, where China can position itself as an early entrant. Xi also seeks to increase China's discourse power, which he frames as China's "right to speak." Since Xi came to power, China has pursued a more hardline foreign policy particularly with regard to China's relations with the United States, the nine-dash line in the South China Sea, and the Sino-Indian border dispute. Additionally, for the sake of advancing Chinese economic interests abroad, China has sought to expand its influence in Africa and Eurasia by championing the Belt and Road Initiative.

Relations between Beijing and Taipei deteriorated under Taiwanese president Tsai Ing-wen, successor of Ma Ying-jeou whom Xi met in 2015. In 2020, a national security law in Hong Kong was passed, which clamped down on political opposition in the city, especially pro-democracy activists. Since Xi came to power, China has witnessed a significant increase in censorship and mass surveillance, a deterioration in human rights (including the persecution of Uyghurs), the rise of a cult of personality, the removal of term limits for the presidency in 2018, as well as an increased role for the CCP in society. Xi's political ideas and principles, known as Xi Jinping Thought, have been incorporated into the party and national constitutions. As the central figure of the fifth generation of leadership of the PRC, Xi has centralized institutional power by taking on multiple positions, overseen significant reforms of Party, state and military bodies, while also increasing the CCP's influence over the state bodies.

== Terminology ==
The Chinese Communist Party (CCP) has described the historical period starting from 2012 as the "New Era of Socialism with Chinese Characteristics" (中国特色社会主义新时代). The term is generally abbreviated as "New Era" (新时代). The CCP says that the new era is "both consistent with and significantly different from the development of the past nearly 40 years of reform and opening up".

== Politics ==
=== Political developments ===
Declaring that the "government, the military, society and schools, north, south, east and west – the party leads them all", Xi has taken measures to significantly increase the role of the CCP in public life. In January 2013, the Politburo made a decision to tighten standards for CCP membership. Consequently, the annual increase in the total numbers of new party members dropped from 2.5 percent in 2012 to 1.1 percent in 2014, 0.7 percent in 2016, and 0.1 percent in 2017, before rising to 1.2 percent in 2018. He oversaw a revival of party life meetings, where party members engage in criticism and self-criticism. Under Xi's tenure, the CCP's membership has grown from 85.13 million in 2012 to 100.27 million in 2024.

In November 2013, at the conclusion of the third plenum of the 18th Central Committee, the Communist Party adopted the Decision on Several Major Issues Concerning Comprehensively Deepening Reform, a far-reaching reform agenda that alluded to changes in both economic and social policy. The Central Leading Group for Comprehensively Deepening Reforms—another ad hoc policy coordination body led by Xi upgraded to a commission in 2018—was also formed to oversee the implementation of the reform agenda. Termed "comprehensive deepening reforms", they were said to be the most significant since Deng Xiaoping's 1992 Southern Tour. The plenum also announced economic reforms and resolved to abolish the laogai system of "re-education through labour", which was largely seen as a blot on China's human rights record. The system faced significant criticism for years from domestic critics and foreign observers.

Xi's administration took a number of changes to the structure of the CCP and state bodies. These reforms have been characterized by the integration of CCP and state bodies. Beginning in 2013, the CCP under Xi has created a series of Central Leading Groups: supra-ministerial steering committees, designed to bypass existing institutions when making decisions, and ostensibly make policy-making a more efficient process. Xi was also believed to have diluted the authority of premier Li Keqiang, taking authority over the economy which has generally been considered to be the domain of the premier. February 2014 oversaw the creation of the Central Leading Group for Cybersecurity and Informatization with Xi as its leader. The State Internet Information Office (SIIO), previously under the State Council Information Office (SCIO), was transferred to the central leading group and renamed the Cyberspace Administration of China (CAC) in English. As part of managing the financial system, the Financial Stability and Development Committee, a State Council body, was established in 2017. Chaired by vice premier Liu He during its existence, the committee was disestablished by the newly established Central Financial Commission during the 2023 Party and state reforms. Xi has increased the role of the Central Financial and Economic Affairs Commission at the expense of the State Council.

Observers have said that Xi has seriously diluted the influence of the once-dominant Tuanpai, also called the Youth League Faction, CCP officials who rose through the Communist Youth League (CYLC). He criticized the cadres of the CYLC, saying that "[these cadres] can't talk about science, literature and art, work or life [with young people]. All they can do is just repeat the same old bureaucratic, stereotypical talk."

In January 2015, Xi started the practice of "personally listen[ing] to reports from Standing Committee of National People's Congress, the State Council, Chinese People's Political Consultative Conference, the Supreme People's Court and the Supreme People’s Procuratorate". In 2015, Xi announced the Four Comprehensives, namely comprehensively build a moderately prosperous society, deepening reform, governing the nation according to law, and strictly governing the Party; in 2021, at the 100th anniversary of the CCP, Xi declared that China achieved its goal of building a moderately prosperous society in all respects. In 2015, Xi oversaw the revamping of the National Honor System.

Xi has had a cult of personality constructed around himself since entering office with books, cartoons, pop songs and dance routines honouring his rule. Xi's cult of personality has been especially pronounced in Xinjiang. In 2016, Xi was proclaimed the CCP's fourth leadership core, following Mao Zedong, Deng Xiaoping, and Jiang Zemin. Following Xi's ascension to the leadership core of the CCP, he had been referred to as Xi Dada (习大大, Uncle or Papa Xi), though this stopped in April 2016. The village of Liangjiahe, where Xi was sent to work, is decorated with propaganda and murals extolling the formative years of his life. The CCP's Politburo named Xi Jinping lingxiu (领袖), a reverent term for "leader" and a title previously only given to Mao Zedong and his immediate successor Hua Guofeng. He is also sometimes called the "pilot at the helm" (领航掌舵).

Xi was re-elected as general secretary and CMC chairman by the 19th Central Committee after the 19th Party National Congress, held between 18 and 24 October 2017; the 19th Politburo was noted for containing no potential successor. A Politburo meeting in October 2017 after the first plenary session of the 19th Central Committee stipulated that all Politburo members must make an annual written presentation to the general secretary and the Central Committee. It also stipulated that the CCP Secretariat, the Central Commission for Discipline Inspection, the Leading Party Members Group of the Standing Committee of the National People's Congress, the Leading Party Members Group of the State Council, the Leading Party Members Group of the Chinese People's Political Consultative Conference, the Leading Party Members Group of the Supreme People's Court and the Leading Party Members Group of the Supreme People's Procuratorate must report their work to the Politburo and its Standing Committee every year.

In March 2018, the first session of the 13th National People's Congress passed constitutional amendments including removal of term limits for the president and vice president, the creation of a National Supervisory Commission, as well as enhancing the central role of the CCP. Xi was reappointed as president, now without term limits, while Li Keqiang was reappointed premier. According to the Financial Times, Xi expressed his views of constitutional amendment at meetings with Chinese officials and foreign dignitaries. Xi explained the decision in terms of needing to align two more powerful posts—general secretary of the CCP and chairman of the CMC—which have no term limits. However, Xi did not say whether he intended to be party general secretary, CMC chairman and state president, for three or more terms. The first session of the 13th NPC also adopted the deepening the reform of the Party and state institutions. In that year, several central leading groups including reform, cyberspace affairs, finance and economics, and foreign affairs were upgraded to commissions. The powers of the Central Publicity Department was strengthened, which now oversaw the newly established China Media Group (CMG). Two State Council departments. one dealing with overseas Chinese, and other one dealing with religious affairs, were merged into the United Front Work Department of the CCP while another commission dealing with ethnic affairs was brought under formal UFWD leadership. On 25 December 2019, the Politburo officially named Xi as "People's Leader" (人民领袖; rénmín lǐngxiù), a title only Mao had held previously. In 2020, all elections at all levels of the people's congress system and NPC were mandated to adhere to the leadership of the CCP.

Xi Jinping and other members of the 20th Politburo Standing Committee meeting the press, October 2022

In its sixth plenary session in November 2021, CCP adopted the Resolution on the Major Achievements and Historical Experience of the Party over the Past Century, which evaluated the party's historical legacy from its foundation in 1921 until its 100th anniversary in 2021. This was the third of historical resolution after ones adopted by Mao Zedong and Deng Xiaoping. In comparison with the other historical resolutions, Xi's one did not herald a major change in how the CCP evaluated its history. To accompany the historical resolution, the CCP promoted the terms Two Establishments and Two Upholds, calling the CCP to unite around and protect Xi's core status within the party. The 20th Party National Congress, held between 16 and 22 October 2022, has overseen amendments in the CCP constitution, with the overall result of the Congress further strengthening Xi's power. Xi was subsequently re-elected as general secretary of the CCP and chairman of the CMC for a third term during the first plenary session of the 20th Central Committee held on 23 October 2022, held immediately after the Party Congress. Xi's re-election made him the first party leader since Mao Zedong to be chosen for a third term. The new Politburo Standing Committee elected by the Central Committee was filled almost completely with people close to Xi, with four out of the seven members of the previous PSC stepping down. Xi was unanimously re-elected as the president and chairman of the PRC Central Military Commission on 10 March 2023 during the first session of the 14th National People's Congress. At the same time, Xi ally Li Qiang succeeded Li Keqiang as the Premier.

2023 has seen further reforms to the CCP and state bureaucracy called the plan on reforming Party and state institutions, which included the strengthening of Party control over the financial and technology domains. This included the creation of two CCP bodies for overseeing finance; the Central Financial Commission (CFC), as well as the revival of the Central Financial Work Commission (CFWC) that was previously dissolved in 2002. Additionally, a new CCP Central Science and Technology Commission would be established to broadly oversee the technology sector, while a newly created Society Work Department was tasked with CCP interactions with several sectors, including civic groups, chambers of commerce and industry groups, as well as handling public petition and grievance work. Regulatory bodies saw large overhauls. Several regulatory responsibilities were also transferred from the People's Bank of China (PBC) to another regulatory body, while the PBC reopened offices around the country that were closed in a previous reorganization.

=== Anti-corruption ===
Xi called for a crack down on corruption immediately after he ascended to power, starting an anti-corruption campaign. In his inaugural speech as general secretary, Xi mentioned that fighting corruption was one of the toughest challenges for the party. A few months into his term, Xi outlined the Eight-point Regulation, listing rules intended to curb corruption and waste during official party business; it aimed at stricter discipline on the conduct of officials. Xi vowed to root out "tigers and flies", that is, high-ranking officials and ordinary party functionaries. He also launched the Party's Mass Line Education and Practice Activities, aiming CCP cadres to use mass line and instill Party discipline. The campaign lasted from 2013 to 2014.

Xi's anti-corruption campaign has led to the downfall of prominent incumbent and retired CCP officials, including members of the PSC. Xi initiated cases against former CMC vice chairmen Xu Caihou and Guo Boxiong, former PSC member and security chief Zhou Yongkang and former CCP General Office director Ling Jihua. Xi has overseen significant reforms of the Central Commission for Discipline Inspection (CCDI), CCP's highest internal control institution. He and CCDI Secretary Wang Qishan further institutionalized CCDI's independence from the day-to-day operations of the CCP, improving its ability to function as a bona fide control body. Along with Wang Qishan, Xi's administration spearheaded the formation of "centrally-dispatched inspection teams". These were cross-jurisdictional squads whose task was to gain understanding of the operations of provincial and local party organizations, and enforce party discipline mandated by Beijing. Work teams had the effect of identifying and initiating investigations of high-ranking officials. Over one hundred provincial-ministerial level officials were implicated during a nationwide anti-corruption campaign. These included former and current regional officials, leading figures of state-owned enterprises and central government organs, and generals. Within the first two years of the campaign alone, over 200,000 officials received warnings, fines, and demotions. As of 2023, approximately 2.3 million government officials have been prosecuted.

According to The Wall Street Journal, anti-corruption punishment to officials at or above the vice ministerial level need approval from Xi. In 2017, the campaign led to the downfall of Chongqing Party Secretary and Politburo member Sun Zhengcai. In March 2018, the National Supervisory Commission was established as the highest state supervisory and anti-corruption authority in an effort to aid the CCDI. In January 2018, Xi launched a three-year Special Campaign to Crack Down on Organized Crime and Eliminate Evil that lasted until 2020. After the special campaign exposed problems in the legal system, the CCP announced a campaign to educate and rectify the political and legal teams in July 2020. Especially since 2023, Xi has also overseen significant anti-corruption efforts in the military, with some targets involving those that rose to prominence under his leadership. Those targeted included former defense ministers Li Shangfu and Wei Fenghe, CMC vice chairmen He Weidong and Zhang Youxia, and CMC member Miao Hua. In addition, former Xinjiang Party Secretary and Politburo member Ma Xingrui was put under investigation in 2026. Bloomberg News estimated that as October 2025, at least 14 generals out of 79 appointed under Xi's leadership have been ousted. Xi has introduced stringent restrictions on naked officials, CCP officials with spouses or children residing abroad, eventually culminating in a 2025 campaign to require cadres of vice-ministerial rank or above being required to either repatriate family members or resign from office.

=== Ideology ===
Xi and CCP ideologues coined the phrase "Chinese Dream" to describe his overarching plans for China as its leader. Xi first used the phrase during a high-profile visit to the National Museum of China on 29 November 2012, where he and his Politburo Standing Committee colleagues were attending a "national revival" exhibition. Since then, the phrase has become the signature political slogan of the Xi era. The origin of the term "Chinese Dream" is unclear. While the phrase has been used before by journalists and scholars, some publications have posited the term likely drew its inspiration from the concept of the American Dream. The Economist noted the abstract and seemingly accessible nature of the concept with no specific overarching policy stipulations may be a deliberate departure from the jargon-heavy ideologies of his predecessors. Xi has linked the "Chinese Dream" with the phrase "great rejuvenation of the Chinese nation".

Under Xi, China has emphasized the Core Socialist Values, which was first articulated during the 18th National Congress in 2012. Xi's tenure has been marked with a tightening of ideology. The Document Number Nine leaked in 2013 warned of seven dangerous Western values, namely Western constitutional democracy, universal values, civil society, neoliberalism, the West's idea of journalism, historical nihilism and the questioning of reform and opening up and the socialist nature of socialism with Chinese characteristics. The document quickly set the ideological tone of the Xi administration. In August 2013, Xi gave what became known as the "August 19 speech" at the National Conference on Publicity and Ideological Work, where he emphasized ideological work, the guiding role of Marxism, and dangers posed by ideological infiltration. "Xi Jinping Thought on socialism with Chinese characteristics for a new era" was formally launched at the 19th National Congress of the Chinese Communist Party having gradually been developed since 2012, when Xi became general secretary of the Chinese Communist Party.

In his political discourse, Xi incorporates historical examples and themes. He describes history as "the best teacher" and "the best textbook". Especially since the COVID-19 pandemic, Xi encourages the Chinese people to develop "historical self-confidence". Xi includes ancient history in his political discourse, characterizing China as a "splendid civilization" and highlighting its five thousand years of history. He often cites the Four Great Inventions as a source of national pride and China's contribution to humanity. In his discourse for foreign audiences regarding China's peaceful rise, Xi quotes the Confucian saying, "If you do not want to have it yourself, you should not want to impose it on others." In his discourse on the community of shared future, Xi cites the third century scholar Chen Shou's saying that "delicious soup is made by combining different ingredients."

=== Military ===
Reform of China's defense and military structure began after Xi Jinping became the General Secretary of the Chinese Communist Party and the Chairman of the Central Military Commission in 2012. Under Xi's administration, China created the CCP National Security Commission and established an air defense identification zone in the East China Sea in 2013. In 2014, Xi told the CCP Politburo that the PLA should operate by integrating multiple services.

In January 2014, Chinese senior military officers said that the People's Liberation Army (PLA) was planning to reduce the number of military regions from seven to five Theater Commands to have joint command with the ground, naval, air and rocket forces. This is planned to change their concept of operations from primarily ground-oriented defense to mobile and coordinated movements of all services and to enhance offensive air and naval capabilities. The coastal areas would be turned into three military regions, each with a joint operations command (Jinan, Nanjing and Guangzhou) for projecting power into the Yellow Sea, East China Sea and South China Sea. The four other inland military regions (Shenyang, Beijing, Chengdu and Lanzhou) will be streamlined into two military areas mainly for organizing forces for operations. The change was projected to occur through 2019.

Xi announced a reduction of 300,000 troops from the PLA in September 2015, bringing its size to 2 million troops. Xi described this as a gesture of peace, while analysts such as Rory Medcalf have said that the cut was done to reduce costs as well as part of PLA's modernization. Around half of the 300,000 troops were officers, and most were from the People's Liberation Army Ground Force. The "deepening national defense and military reform" was announced in November 2015 at a plenary session of the Central Military Commission (CMC)'s Central Leading Group for Military Reform. They were expected to be long and extensive that aimed at turning the PLA into a modern military on par with international standards. Before the reforms were announced, Xi said the CMC should directly control the military and new regional commands be created. On 1 January 2016, the CMC issued its "Deepening National Defense and Military Reform" document, which called for major restructuring of the military with the goal of modernizing and enhancing the military's operational capabilities.

=== National security ===
Xi has devoted a large amount of work towards national security, calling for the establishment of a holistic national security concept that encompasses "all aspects of the work of the party and the country." He introduced the concept in 2014, which he defined as taking "the security of the people as compass, political security as its roots, economic security as its pillar, military security and cultural security as its protections, and that relies on the promotion of international security." A new National Security Commission was formed in 2014 with Xi at its helm, centralizing national security decision-making. Since its creation by Xi, the National Security Commission has established local security committees, focusing on dissent. In 2015, 15 April was declared as National Security Education Day.

Believing it to be an important foundation of national security, Xi's administration has prioritized efforts to establish food security by pushing for as much as self-sufficiency in food as possible, while launching the Clean Plate campaign in 2013 and 2020 to combat food waste. He has additionally given priority to energy security; China is the world's largest energy consumer, having consumed more energy than the United States, the European Union and Japan combined in 2024. China has made heavy investments in its energy grid and designed policies to lessen dependence on foreign energy imports by investing in renewable energy as well as coal.

Xi has championed the Fengqiao experience, calling on officials to contain and resolve conflicts at the grassroots level without needing to involve higher legal bodies. In the name of national security, Xi's government has passed numerous laws including the Counterespionage Law in 2014, the National Security Law and the Counterterrorism Law in 2015, the Cybersecurity Law and the Law on Administration of Foreign NGOs' Activities within China in 2016, the National Intelligence Law in 2017, and the Data Security Law in 2021. Under Xi, China's mass surveillance network has dramatically grown, with comprehensive profiles being built for each citizen. Grid-style social management, which involves subdividing China's counties into smaller zones, and assigning each zone to a person that reports all activity to the local government on a regular basis, has risen in prominence under Xi. Public security spending has increased significantly under Xi, reaching $210 billion in 2020, more than double from the decade prior; this was accompanied by a significant decrease in crime. Xi's leadership has also seen a more prominent role taken by the Ministry of State Security, which expanded its public profile.

=== Legal system ===
Judicial policies during the general secretaryship of Xi Jinping have highlighted increased professionalization of the judiciary and autonomy in routine cases, while maintaining the subordination of the judiciary to the CCP.

In January 2014, Xi told a political legal work conference to "Stop worrying about the harm and blowback that the current rectification of mistakes may bring us. We know about the unjust, false, and wrong cases. Let’s worry more about the harm and impact these cases have exacted on the people and on the credibility of our judiciary work. The rectification of mistakes—it’s better late than never". The party under Xi announced a raft of legal reforms at the fourth plenary session of the 18th Central Committee held in the fall 2014, and he called for "Chinese socialistic rule of law" immediately afterwards. The party aimed to reform the legal system, which had been perceived as ineffective at delivering justice and affected by corruption, local government interference and lack of constitutional oversight. The plenum, while emphasizing the absolute leadership of the party, also called for a greater role of the constitution in the affairs of state and a strengthening of the role of the National People's Congress Standing Committee in interpreting the constitution. It also called for more transparency in legal proceedings, more involvement of ordinary citizens in the legislative process, and an overall "professionalization" of the legal workforce. The party also planned to institute cross-jurisdictional circuit legal tribunals as well as giving provinces consolidated administrative oversight over lower level legal resources, which is intended to reduce local government involvement in legal proceedings. Xi's reforms have attempted to see that CCP officials operate within the law without challenging party leadership.

There have been several reforms to the court system under Xi, including transferring the authority over local court finance and personnel from local governments to the provincial-level, establishing a personnel quota system, emphasizing "lifetime accountability" for judges for their judicial decisions, and specification of case transferring procedures between various courts. The practice of party decisions being implemented with or without legislative approval was replaced with the requirement that they have legal authorization. In 2014, China started efforts to pass a unified Civil Code, which was eventually adopted in 2020. An Anti-Domestic Violence Law was passed in 2015. In the same year, the death penalty was removed for nine more crimes. Efforts were expanded to increase the educational credentials of the judges. A two-year pilot reform to select juries randomly rather than having them chosen through recommendations by local authorities, while efforts were made to increase the independence of judiciary from the local political-legal committees.

In 2015, Xi's administration oversaw the establishment of two circuit courts under the Supreme People's Court, followed by four other circuit courts being established in 2016. Hangzhou Internet Court was established as a court of special jurisdiction in 2017, followed by the establishment of Beijing Internet Court and Guangzhou Internet Court. Shanghai Financial Court was established in 2018 as a specialized financial court.

Under Xi, an increasing share of laws passed by the NPC explicitly affirmed the leadership of the CCP, with the share increasing from 4% in 2018 to nearly 70% in 2024. In 2020, the doctrine of the Three Supremes was expanded with the "Eleven Upholds" as part of Xi Jinping Thought on the Rule of Law. In 2024, the CCP's role was strengthened further with the Organic Law of the State Council amended to add a clause about following CCP ideology and policies.

China's ranking in the World Bank's Worldwide Governance Indicator "Rule of Law score" improved from the 35th percentile in 2012 at the beginning of Xi's tenure to the 53rd percentile in 2023.

== Foreign relations ==
During the Xi Jinping administration, China seeks to shape international norms and rules in emerging policy areas where China has an advantage as an early participant. Xi describes such areas as "new frontiers," and they include policy areas such as space, deep sea, polar regions, the Internet, nuclear safety, anticorruption, and climate change.

In his effort to build additional institutional capacity for foreign policy coordination, Xi Jinping created the National Security Commission (NSC), which absorbed the NSLG. The NSC's focus is holistic national security and it addresses both external and internal security matters. Xi introduced the holistic security concept in 2014, which he defined as taking "the security of the people as compass, political security as its roots, economic security as its pillar, military security, cultural security, and cultural security as its protections, and that relies on the promotion of international security."

During the Xi Jinping era, the Community of Common Destiny has become China's most important foreign relations formulation. In his foreign policy discourse, Xi cites the examples of "foreign friends of China" to acknowledge other countries' sacrifices to assist in China's national liberation, particularly with regard to the Second Sino-Japanese war. For example, during diplomatic visits to other countries, Xi has praised the contributions of people like Claire Lee Chennault, Norman Bethune, Dawarkanath Kotnis, and Soviet pilots.

Xi emphasizes his desire to increase China's discourse power in international matters, often characterizing this in terms of China's "right to speak".

During Xi's administration, China has often extended state-backed loans for energy and infrastructure-building in exchange for natural resources in regions like Central Asia and Africa.

In 2017, state councillor Yang Jiechi incorporated the term "great changes unseen in a century" into political discourse, describing it as a guiding tenet of Xi Jinping Thought on Diplomacy. Xi then used the phrase in a speech to the 2018 Central Foreign Affairs Work Conference. Xi stated:

China now finds itself in the best period for development it has seen since the advent of the modern era; [simultaneously], the world faces great changes unseen in a century. These two [trends] are interwoven, advancing in lockstep; each stimulates the other. Now, and in the years to come, many advantageous international conditions exist for success in foreign affairs.

The China–United States trade war, begun under US president Donald Trump, resulted in increased economic ties between China and the European Union, largely resulting from shifts in commodity flows.

== Economy ==
China became the world's second largest economy in 2012. In 2013, it became a middle-income country. Xi Jinping has set three overarching goals for China's economy. First, to increase China's capacity for innovation so that it will be able to more actively shape global economic rules. Second, to enhance order and security in China's domestic market. Third, creating common prosperity and increasing wealth distribution to the poor. China's economy has grown under Xi, more than doubling from CN¥54.8 trillion (US$8.7 trillion) in 2012 to CN¥140.2 trillion (US$20.1 trillion) in 2024, while China's nominal GDP per capita increased from CN¥40,431 (US$6,408) in 2012 to CN¥99,665 (US$14,318) in 2025, surpassing the world average in 2021, though growth has slowed from 7.9% in 2012 to 5% in 2024.

Xi has formulated the new concept for development, stressing the importance of high-quality development rather than "inflated growth". He has stated China has abandoned a growth-at-all-costs strategy which Xi refers to as "GDP heroism". Instead, Xi said other social issues such as environmental protection are important. In 2017, Xi stated the primary contradiction of China's conditions in the new era as "the contradiction between the people's ever-growing need for a better life and unbalanced and inadequate development." In this context, "unbalanced" refers to rural-urban inequalities, regional inequalities, inequalities between the rich and poor, and structural imbalances in the economy. "Inadequate" refers to household income share. Xi has overseen regional economic development initiatives within China such as the Coordinated Development of the Beijing-Tianjin-Hebei Region, Strategy for Integrated Development of the Yangtze River Delta and the Guangdong–Hong Kong–Macao Greater Bay Area. Xi has been involved in the development of Xiong'an, a new area announced in 2017, planned to become a major metropolis near Beijing; the relocation aspect is estimated to last until 2035 while it is planned to developed into a "modern socialist city" by 2050. During the Xi Jinping administration, China has emphasized an economic strategy of dual circulation. First, it seeks to rely more on China's domestic consumers. Second, it seeks to innovate more domestically developed technology and thereby reduce China's reliance on western technology. Xi has prioritized boosting productivity.

China met the first of its Two Centenaries goals, becoming an upper-middle income country and eliminating absolute poverty according to the World Bank criteria in 2020. By 2020, China became the largest trading partner of more than 120 countries. At the end of that year, China signed major free trade agreements with the European Union as well as fifteen different Asia-Pacific countries. As of at least 2023, China is the world's largest exporter, a status it has maintained continuously since 2010. China's was the only major world economy to experience GDP growth in 2020, when its GDP increased by 2.3%. In 2021, China's GDP growth reached 8.1% (its highest in a decade) and its trade surplus reached an all-time high $687.5 billion. By 2025, China's trade surplus reached a record $1.2 trillion.

=== Economic reforms ===
The Decision of the third plenary session of the 13th Central Committee announced "market forces" would begin to play a "decisive" role in allocating resources. This meant that the state would gradually reduce its involvement in the distribution of capital, and restructure state-owned enterprises (SOEs) to allow further competition, potentially by attracting foreign and private sector players in industries previously highly regulated. This policy aimed to address the bloated state sector that had unduly profited from re-structuring by purchasing assets at below-market prices, assets no longer being used productively. However, by 2017, Xi's promise of economic reforms was said to have stalled by external observers. In 2015, the Chinese stock market bubble popped, which led Xi to use state forces to fix it. In November 2015, Xi proposed the supply-side structural reform concept to reform the Chinese economy by reducing supply that would bring down debt and promote efficiency. These included cutting steel and production targets. In 2018, he promised to continue reforms but warned nobody "can dictate to the Chinese people." Xi has increased state control over the economy, voicing support for SOEs, while also supporting the private sector. CCP control of SOEs has increased, while limited steps towards market liberalization, such as increasing mixed ownership of SOEs were undertaken. From 2016, China encouraged bigger and competitive SOEs to streamline themselves. Under Xi, an increasing number of private companies have established Party branches.

From 2012 to 2022, the share of the market value of private sector firms in China's top listed companies increased from 10% to over 40%. He has overseen the relaxation of restrictions on foreign direct investment (FDI) and increased cross-border holdings of stocks and bonds. His administration made it easier for banks to issue mortgages, increased foreign participation in the bond market, and increased the national currency renminbi's global role, helping it to join IMF's basket of special drawing right. Additionally, there have been moves to increase the liberalization of interest rates as well as tax cuts to encourage industries. Xi launched the Shanghai Free-Trade Zone in 2013. In 2018, Xi announced the Shanghai Stock Exchange STAR Market, which opened in 2019. He also proposed the establishment of the Hainan Free Trade Port. In 2020, The Wall Street Journal reported that Xi ordered a halt to Ant Group's initial public offering (IPO), in reaction to its founder Jack Ma criticizing government regulation in finance. Xi opened a new stock exchange in Beijing targeted for small and medium enterprises (SMEs). Under Xi, government guidance funds, public-private investment funds set up by or for government bodies, have raised more than $900 billion for early funding to companies that work in sectors the government deems as strategic. Xi's administration has overseen a decrease in offshore IPOs by Chinese companies, with most Chinese IPOs taking place either in Shanghai or Shenzhen as of 2022, and has increasingly directed funding to IPOs of companies that works in sectors it deems as strategic, including electric vehicles, biotechnology, renewable energy, artificial intelligence, semiconductors and other high-technology manufacturing.

=== Poverty and inequality ===
Common prosperity is an essential requirement of socialism and a key feature of Chinese-style modernization. The common prosperity we are pursuing is for all, affluence both in material and spiritual life, but not for a small portion nor for uniform egalitarianism.

— Xi Jinping during a speech in 2021

Xi has made eradicating extreme poverty through targeted poverty alleviation a key goal. In 2015, he launched the battle against poverty. The campaign concluded by 2021, when Xi declared a "complete victory" over extreme poverty at the National Poverty Alleviation Summary and Commendation Conference, saying nearly 100 million have been lifted out of poverty under his tenure, though some experts said China's poverty threshold was lower than that of the World Bank. In 2020, premier Li Keqiang, citing the National Bureau of Statistics (NBS) said that China still had 600 million people living with less than 1000 yuan ($140) a month, although The Economist said the methodology NBS used was flawed. When Xi took office in 2012, 58% of people in China were living on less than $8.30 per day, in 2022 this had fallen to 21%.

Income inequality decreased in the 2010s, and China's Gini coefficient was 0.36 in 2022, down from 0.42 in 2012. Since 2021, Xi has promoted the term common prosperity, which he defined as an "essential requirement of socialism", described as affluence for all and said entailed reasonable adjustments to excess incomes. Common prosperity has been used as the justification for large-scale crackdowns and regulations towards the perceived "excesses" of several sectors, most prominently tech and tutoring industries. Actions taken include fining large tech companies and passing laws such as the Data Security Law. China introduced severe restrictions on private tutoring in the name of promoting social equality, effectively eliminating the private education industry and enacting the Double Reduction Policy. The push for common prosperity has also included salary and bonus cuts, especially across the financial sector, as well as crackdowns on wealth flaunting.

=== Industrial policy ===
Xi has heavily emphasized the role of advanced manufacturing and technology development to drive China's future economic growth. Since 2015, the CCP has issued several industrial plans designed to emphasize high-tech innovation and digital development. These industrial plans include Made in China 2025, the "Action Outline for Promoting the Development of Big Data", and the "Three-Year Action Plan to Promote the Development of a New Generation of Artificial Intelligence Industry". Although publicly China de-emphasized this plan due to the outbreak of a China–United States trade war, majority of the goals of Made in China 2025 were considered achieved by 2024. China's 13th and 14th Five-Year Plans have also emphasized high-tech and innovative development.

Since shortly after taking office as General Secretary, Xi emphasized the use of industrial policy to increase domestic innovation and reduce reliance on foreign technology. In 2015, Xi's administration launched the Double First-Class Construction, a higher education development and sponsorship scheme intended to replace the previous programs Project 211 and Project 985. Since the outbreak of the trade war in 2018, Xi has further pushed calls for "self-reliance", especially on technology. China's domestic spending on R&D has significantly increased, surpassing the European Union (EU) and reaching a record $564 billion in 2020, up from $120 billion in 2012. The Chinese government has supported technology companies like Huawei through grants, tax breaks, credit facilities and other assistance, enabling their rise, leading to US countermeasures. In 2023, Xi put forward new productive forces, this refers to a new form of productive forces derived from continuous sci-tech breakthroughs and innovation that drive strategic emerging and future industries in a more intelligent information era.

Under Xi, China made rapid advances in key technological areas, becoming a world leader in tech such as electric vehicles, lithium batteries and solar panels. Adoption of electric vehicles throughout the country has been especially rapid since 2020. Plug-in electric vehicle (BEV and PHEV) sales were 47.9% of the overall automotive sales in China in 2024, up from 2020 when they accounted for only 6.3% of total sales.

=== Property sector ===
Xi has attempted to reform the property sector to combat the steep increase in prices and cut the economy's dependence on it. In the 19th CCP National Congress, Xi declared "houses are for living, not for speculation." In 2020, Xi's government formulated the "three red lines" policy that aimed to deleverage the heavily indebted property sector. Xi has supported a property tax, for which he has faced resistance from members of the CCP. His administration pursued a debt-deleveraging campaign, seeking to slow and cut the unsustainable amount of debt China has accrued during its growth. Since 2021, China has faced a property sector crisis, with decreasing house prices, shrinking of the real estate sector and bankruptcies of many property developers, partially as a result of Xi's efforts to decrease the sector's role in the Chinese economy. According to Bloomberg Economics estimates, the sector contributed to about 19% of China's GDP in 2024, down from a peak of 24% in 2018. According to the National Bureau of Statistics, the share of real estate and related industries as a share of China's GDP dropped from 14.45% in 2021 to 12.94% in 2024, while the share of real estate alone dropped from 7.7% to 6.27%.

== Society ==
=== Social life ===
Through previously foreign brands were preferred, Chinese consumers have increasingly shifted towards preferring local companies under Xi.

The urbanization rate has continued to increase under Xi, increasing from 53% in 2012 to 66% in 2024. In January 2016, a two-child policy replaced the one-child policy, which was in turn was replaced with a three-child policy in May 2021. In July 2021, all family size limits as well as penalties for exceeding them were removed. Since abandoning population control restrictions, China has pursued pro-natalist policies in an attempt to boost the birth rate.

=== Mass culture ===
Under Xi, China has intervened extensively in mass culture through censorship and propaganda, promoting patriotism and nationalism, traditional culture, family values and pronatalist policies while suppressing LGBTQ, feminism, and youth cultures perceived as socially disengaged or subversive, such as hip-hop, DINK, tang ping, and rùn.

Since the 2010s, China has cracked down on unlicensed foreign content on streaming platforms and then disbanded fan-subtitling groups, the primary importer of unlicensed foreign content. In 2015, shortly before International Women's Day, the Feminist Five were arrested in what became a turning point for China's feminist movement. Following the MeToo movement, authorities suppressed several high-profile cases and intensified crackdowns on "extreme feminism" and "gender antagonism." Since 2016, LGBTQ content has been banned from film and television, with restrictions subsequently extended to dangai—works adapted from LGBTQ source material without explicit same-sex content—and to actors appearing in such productions; authors of boys' love and slash fiction were also arrested for "producing and distributing obscene content".

Censors and state media have often targeted or banned tattoos, body piercings, hip-hop, dyed hair, flamboyant dress, immodest female dress, and men deemed effeminate or heavily made-up. Celebrities and fan culture are subject to both co-optation for state messaging and heavy regulation. Celebrities are expected to toe the party line on sensitive issues, such as the South China Sea Arbitration, Xinjiang cotton, and Taiwan question, typically by reposting state media content or boycotting offending international companies. Certain forms of private conducts—from adultery to irreverent jokes about party leaders—may result in official blacklisting.

The official promotion of traditional culture has fueled the Hanfu movement—a modern revival and largely imaginative reconstruction of historical Chinese dress popularized through cosplay and costume dramas—amid a broader surge in Han nationalist sentiment. These trends sit in contrast to the Party policy of ethnic harmony, which has manifested more concretely through censorship: references to ethnic conflict in both new productions and older works have been revised or removed. New adaptations of Jin Yong's wuxia novels illustrate this pattern: The Heaven Sword and Dragon Saber (2019) removed references to Persia; The Deer and the Cauldron (2021) excised portrayals of Tibetans and Russians; and The Legend of the Condor Heroes (2025) deleted a filmed storyline depicting the fictional Chinese hero leading the Mongol invasion of the Khwarazmian Empire. Streaming versions of older Jin Yong adaptations have similarly been subject to retrospective censorship.

Amid the burgeoning development of video game industry, in 2014, China partially eased the restrictions on video game hardware by allowing game consoles to be manufactured in the Shanghai Free-Trade Zone (FTZ) and sold in the rest of China subject to cultural inspections. In July 2015, the ban on video game consoles within the country was completely lifted. In 2018, the process of getting gaming licenses became more stringent. By December 2018, the Chinese government formed the Online Game Ethics Committee falling under the National Radio and Television Administration. The government placed a freeze on new video games during periods of 2018 and 2019, and also placed restrictions on the amount of time minors can play video games, first in 2019 to 90 minutes per day on weekdays and three hours on weekends, and then to only one hour per day on weekends by 2021. In March 2021, Xi claimed that video games could have a bad influence on the minds of children who are psychologically immature. The government also banned the live streaming of unapproved games in April 2022. The gaming industry returned to growth by 2024, along with the launch of China's first AAA game Black Myth: Wukong.

In November 2016, China passed a film law banning content deemed harmful to the "dignity, honor and interests" of the People's Republic of China and encouraging the promotion of core socialist values, approved by the National People's Congress Standing Committee. Since 2017, the industry is regulated by the Film Industry Promotion Act. In 2018, responsibility for press, publishing, and film was transferred from the State Administration of Press, Publication, Radio, Film and Television under the State Council to the Central Propaganda Department, marking a tightening of Party control over these specific sectors.

Under Xi, China has moved toward greater self-sufficiency in film by increasingly marginalizing Hollywood imports. In 2020, China's market for films surpassed the U.S. market to become the largest such market in the world. The domestic share of box office receipts rose to 88.8 percent in 2025, up from 47.6 percent in 2012. Notable Chinese films released during this period reflect a shift toward nationalist themes, traditional culture, and family values, include Wolf Warrior 2 (2017), The Wandering Earth (2019), Hi, Mom (2021), The Battle at Lake Changjin (2021) and Ne Zha 2 (2025). In addition, since the early 2020s, duanju (short vertical dramas) have grown rapidly, accelerated by pandemic lockdowns. In 2024, industry reports indicated that the duanju market surpassed the national film box office for the first time, generating over ¥50 billion compared to ¥47 billion for traditional cinema. This shift reflects evolving viewing habits, especially among younger audiences.

=== Education ===
In 2014, the Party General Office and State Council issued guidance on strengthening ideological education in colleges and universities. Xi has emphasized that tertiary education must "firmly uphold the correct political direction" in December 2016, calling on both professors and students to be loyal to the CCP. During Xi Jinping's tenure, numerous colleges and universities have established schools of Marxism. In 2012, there were about a hundred such schools nationwide; as of 2021, there were more than 1,440. Master's degree and Doctoral programs in Marxism have increased significantly since 2016. Xi has implemented a number of education reforms. Schools are required to adjust their opening hours to be consistent with work hours in their area so that parents can pick-up their children directly after work (in order to reduce reliance on private classes for adult supervision after school hours). Schools must also promote health by requiring outdoor physical education classes daily and providing eye examinations twice per term. Educational reforms have also limited the amount of homework students can be assigned.

As part of Xi's 2021 directive on "double lessening" (reducing excessive off-campus tutoring and reducing homework burdens), schools may not assign homework to children to grades one and two, homework is limited to no more than 60 minutes for children in grades three to six, and no more than 90 minutes for middle school children. In July 2021, China enacted a series of rules designed to shutdown the private tutoring sector. The government's rationale was that rising educational costs were antithetical to the goals of common prosperity. Shutting down private tutoring was intended to narrow the education gap between rich and poor.Rules issued in July 2021 prohibits new registration of private tuition tutoring centers and required existing centers to re-organize as non-profits. Tuition centers are prohibited from being listed on the stock market or receiving "excessive capital." They are no longer permitted to offer tutoring on the weekends or during public holidays. Since September 2021, private schools providing compulsory education can no longer be controlled by foreign entities or individuals. Only Chinese nationals may serve on their boards of directors.

In 2018, Xi warned that "various hostile forces have never stopped implementing strategies to Westernize and divide our country", while continuing by saying "fight over the youth is long-term and difficult, we cannot lose, and cannot afford to lose". In mid-2021, the Ministry of Education announced that Xi Jinping Thought would be taught to Chinese students beginning at the primary school level as part of ideological and political education, and announced the Outline for the Study of Xi Jinping Thought on Socialism with Chinese Characteristics for a New Era textbook. In August 2023, the Introduction to Xi Jinping Thought on Socialism with Chinese Characteristics for a New Era was added as a textbook for ideological and political education in colleges and universities. In 2023, the Patriotic Education Law of the People's Republic of China was adopted, codifying the mandatory patriotic education program in the country.

Chinese society has become increasingly educated since 2012. By 2023, more than 90% of preschool-age children in China were enrolled in kindergarten, up 26.6% from 2012. Higher education enrollment rates have increased from 29% in 2012 to 72% in 2022. Studying abroad has become less popular in the 2020s; from 2019 to 2025, the number of Chinese students abroad dropped from 703,500 to 570,600.

=== Environment ===
In 2015 China declared a “war” on pollution, bringing a significant decrease in air pollution in the 2010s. In September 2020, Xi announced that China will "strengthen its 2030 climate target (NDC), peak emissions before 2030 and aim to achieve carbon neutrality before 2060." If accomplished, this would lower the expected rise in global temperature by 0.2–0.3 °C – "the biggest single reduction ever estimated by the Climate Action Tracker." Xi mentioned the link between the COVID-19 pandemic and nature destruction as one of the reasons for the decision, saying that "Humankind can no longer afford to ignore the repeated warnings of nature." On 27 September, Chinese scientists presented a detailed plan how to achieve the target. In September 2021, Xi announced that China will not build "coal-fired power projects abroad", which was said to be potentially "pivotal" in reducing emissions. The Belt and Road Initiative did not include financing such projects already in the first half of 2021.

=== Human rights ===
According to the Human Rights Watch, Xi has "started a broad and sustained offensive on human rights" since he became leader in 2012. The HRW also said that repression in China is "at its worst level since the Tiananmen Square massacre." Since taking power, Xi has cracked down on grassroots activism, with hundreds being detained. He presided over the 709 crackdown on 9 July 2015, which saw more than 200 lawyers, legal assistants and human rights activists being detained. His term has seen the arrest and imprisonment of activists such as Xu Zhiyong, as well as numerous others who identified with the New Citizens' Movement. Prominent legal activist Pu Zhiqiang of the Weiquan movement was also arrested and detained.

In 2017, the local government of the Jiangxi province told Christians to replace their pictures of Jesus with Xi Jinping as part of a general campaign on unofficial churches in the country. According to local social media, officials "transformed them from believing in religion to believing in the party." According to activists, "Xi is waging the most severe systematic suppression of Christianity in the country since religious freedom was written into the Chinese constitution in 1982," and according to pastors and a group that monitors religion in China, has involved "destroying crosses, burning bibles, shutting churches and ordering followers to sign papers renouncing their faith."

==== Ethnic minorities ====
Under Xi, the CCP has embraced assimilationist policies towards ethnic minorities, scaling back affirmative action in the country by 2019, and scrapping a wording in October 2021 that guaranteed the rights of minority children to be educated in their native language, replacing it with one that emphasized teaching the national language. In 2014, Xi called to foster a sense of community for the Chinese nation among ethnic minorities. In 2020, Chen Xiaojiang was appointed as head of the National Ethnic Affairs Commission, the first Han Chinese head of the body since 1954. On 24 June 2022, Pan Yue, another Han Chinese, became the head of the commission, with him reportedly holding assimilationist policies toward ethnic minorities. Xi outlined his official views relations between the majority Han Chinese and ethnic minorities by saying "[n]either Han chauvinism nor local ethnic chauvinism is conducive to the development of a community for the Chinese nation." Xi's policies toward ethnic minorities were codified in the Law on Promoting Ethnic Unity and Progress in 2026.

==== Xinjiang ====
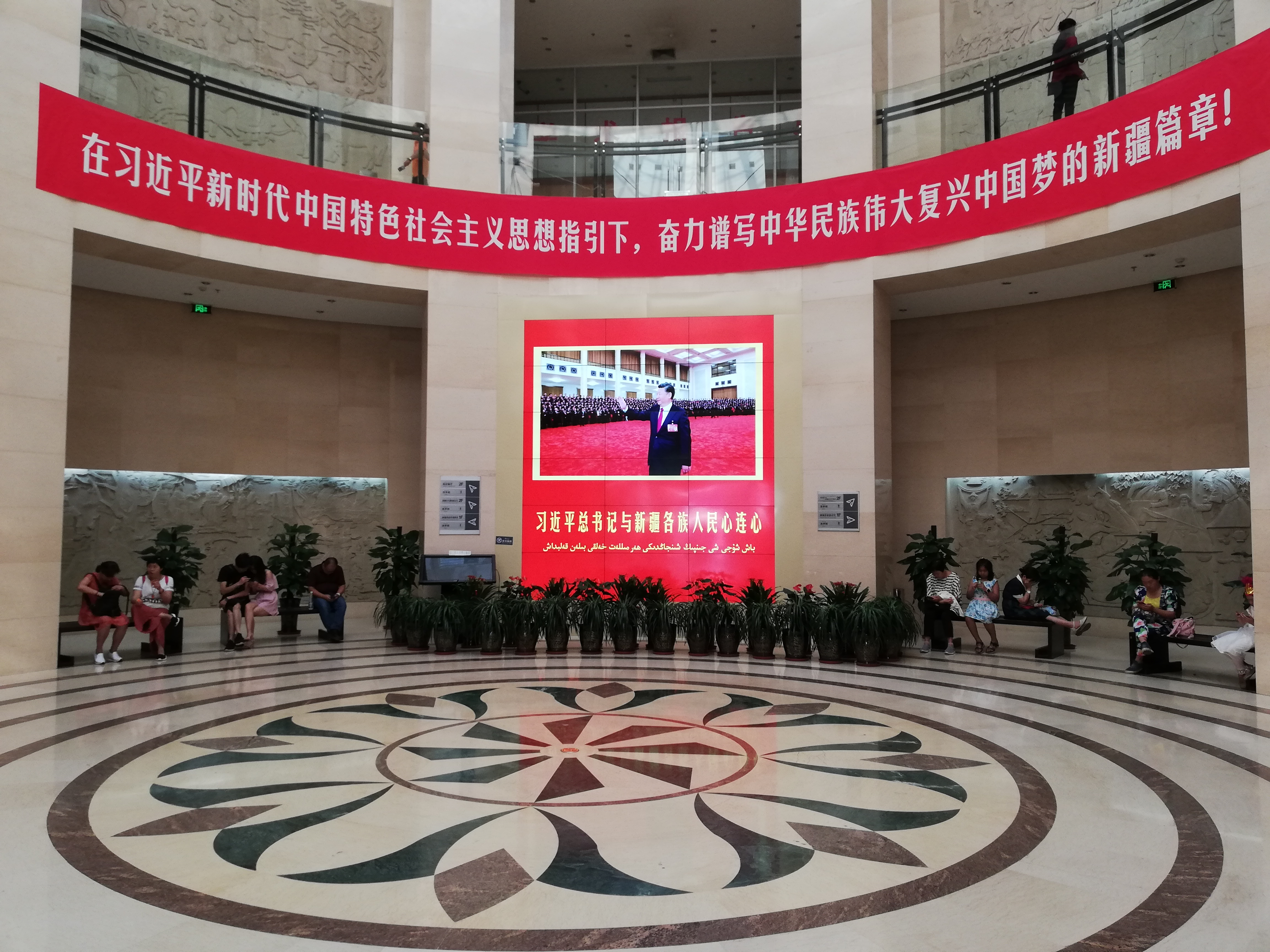
Xi Jinping's picture at the entrance hall of the Xinjiang Museum in Ürümqi, August 2018

There were several terrorist attacks in Xinjiang in 2013 and 2014; an attack in Ürümqi in April 2014 occurred just after the conclusion of a visit by Xi Jinping to Xinjiang. Following these attacks, CCP leaders held a secret meeting to find a solution to the attacks, leading to Xi to launch the Strike Hard Campaign Against Violent Terrorism in 2014, which involved mass detention, and surveillance of ethnic Uyghurs there. The campaign included the detainment of 1.8 million people in re-education camps, mostly Uyghurs but also including other ethnic and religious minorities, by 2020, and a birth suppression campaign that led to a large drop in the Uyghur birth rate by 2019. Human rights groups and former inmates have described the camps as "concentration camps", where Uyghurs and other minorities have been forcibly assimilated into China's majority ethnic Han society. This program has been called a genocide by some observers, while a report by the UN Human Rights Office said they may amount to crimes against humanity.

Internal Chinese government documents leaked to the press in November 2019 showed that Xi personally ordered a security crackdown in Xinjiang, saying that the party must show "absolutely no mercy" and that officials use all the "weapons of the people's democratic dictatorship" to suppress those "infected with the virus of extremism." The papers also showed that Xi repeatedly discussed about Islamic extremism in his speeches, likening it to a "virus" or a "drug" that could be only addressed by "a period of painful, interventionary treatment." However, he also warned against the discrimination against Uyghurs and rejected proposals to eradicate Islam in China, calling that kind of viewpoint "biased, even wrong." Xi's exact role in the building of re-education camps has not been publicly reported, though he's widely believed to be behind them and his words have been the source for major justifications in the crackdown in Xinjiang.

During a four-day visit to Xinjiang in July 2022, Xi urged local officials to always listen to the people's voices and to do more in preservation of ethnic minority culture. He also inspected the Xinjiang Production and Construction Corps and praised its "great progress" in reform and development. During another visit to Xinjiang in August 2023, Xi said in a speech that the region was "no longer a remote area" and should open up more for tourism to attract domestic and foreign visitors.

=== Media ===
Since Xi became general secretary, censorship has stepped up. Under his leadership, propaganda has become more prevalent and homogeneous in media. Xi has overseen the increased coordination and consolidation of censorship authorities, raising their efficiency, and under his leadership censorship practices have tightened. Xi has called on for more positive energy at Chinese media, referring to the need for uplifting messages as opposed to critical or negative ones. The Marxist view of journalism was developed under his leadership, describing the governance of journalism according to Party ideology. In 2015, Xi and the Central Leading Group for Comprehensively Deepening Reforms published the Guiding Opinion on Promoting Convergent Development of Traditional Media and New Media, where he urged for the creation of a "new mainstream media", which would be established with the converge of traditional and digital media and lead to the formation of "new-form media groups". He visited the People’s Liberation Army Daily in December 2015, where he said communication technologies were "undergoing profound change". At the Symposium on News Reporting and Public Opinion in 2016, Xi stated that "party and government-owned media must hold the family name of the party" and that the state media "must embody the party's will, safeguard the party's authority". In the same year, the liberal Yanhuang Chunqiu was temporarily closed before a new management team with pro-government editors was installed.

At Xi's urging, numerous local and regional media groups started establishing multimedia content production and distribution centers. In September 2020, the CCP General Office and the State Council released the Opinion on Accelerating the Development of Deep Media Convergence, which called on more positive energy in the Chinese media. In October 2021, the National Development and Reform Commission published rules restricting private capital in "news-gathering, editing, broadcasting, and distribution." 2020s also saw the establishment of international communication centers throughout China.

=== Internet ===
Xi's tenure marked the first time a majority of Chinese people were connected to the Internet. From 2012 to 2025, the percent of Chinese people using the Internet increased from 42 percent to 92 percent. Xi's administration has overseen more Internet restrictions imposed, and is described as being "stricter across the board" on speech than previous administrations. The State Internet Information Office summoned influential bloggers to a seminar to instruct them to avoid writing about politics, the CCP, or making statements contradicting official narratives. Many bloggers stopped writing about controversial topics, and Weibo went into decline, with much of its readership shifting to WeChat users speaking to limited social circles. The SIIO also formulated the Seven Bottom Lines, which serve as the bottom lines that internet users and social media companies in China must adhere to. In September 2013, the Supreme People's Court authorized a three-year prison term for bloggers who shared more than 500 times any content considered "defamatory".

In 2014, the Chinese government launched the Cleaning the Web campaign, aiming to crack down on pornographic, vulgar, and politically questionable content. It also launched Operation Qinglang campaigns since 2016 to "clean up" the Chinese internet. China under Xi has taken a strong stand to control internet usage inside China, including Google, Facebook and Wikipedia, advocating Internet censorship under the concept of internet sovereignty. Likewise, the situation for users of Weibo has been described as a change from fearing one's account would be deleted, to fear of arrest. Under Xi's administration, China started enforcing an Internet real-name system for online platforms, requiring them to collect users' real names, ID numbers, and other information when providing services. The Provisions on the Governance of the Online Information Content Ecosystem, which came into effect in 2020, defined the scope of legal expression for service platforms and content creators. Chairing the 2018 China Cyberspace Governance Conference, Xi committed to "fiercely crack down on criminal offenses including hacking, telecom fraud, and violation of citizens' privacy." China has grappled with new forms of Internet scams in the 2020s, including human trafficking cases in countries like Myanmar and Cambodia as well as pig butchering scams.

=== Religion ===
Religious sinicization (from "sinicize", meaning somebody or something modified under Chinese influence) usually refers to "the indigenisation of religious faith, practice, and ritual in Chinese culture and society". Since Xi Jinping took office as the General Secretary of the Chinese Communist Party in 2012, the officially atheist Chinese Communist Party (CCP) has tightened restrictions on religion in the People's Republic of China.

The ruling CCP requires its members to be atheists or face expulsion from the party. After the proclamation of the People's Republic of China in 1949, CCP leaders viewed religion as a potential threat, associating it with foreign influence, feudalism, and superstition. During the Cultural Revolution (1966–1976), CCP Chairman Mao Zedong undertook a campaign to eliminate religion, which led to the widespread destruction of religious sites and persecution of believers. Under Deng Xiaoping, the CCP shifted to a regulatory policy, aimed at managing religion and using its influence to achieve other party objectives, as well as to suppress any threat it might present to the party's authority. Given the apparent expansion of religion in Chinese society in recent decades, CCP leaders have responded with a combination of regulations and repression.

The Xi general secretaryship has broadly followed a similar approach to religion and continued policies initiated by its predecessors. However, religious policy under Xi Jinping can be distinguished from that of the Hu Jintao era in four key ways: a set of new, more restrictive legal instruments has been introduced, religious persecution targets have broadened, there is increased state interference in daily religious practices, and there are new forms of technological surveillance.

In May 2015, sinicization entered the official discourse when Xi Jinping declared, at the Central United Front Work Conference, that religion in China should be adapted to align with socialist values and must adhere to the path of sinicization. The theme of religious sinicization has grown more prominent in official discourse. He further emphasized his strategy of religious Sinicisation in a speech in 2016. This was followed up in 2018 by the National People's Congress and Chinese People's Political Consultative Conference (CPPCC) approving the administrative, ideological, and legal frameworks for the policy of Sinicisation, with these measures coming into force on the 1st of February 2020.

The CCP's policy is an attempt to bring religions under state control and align them with Chinese culture. The campaign particularly affects religions deemed 'foreign', such as Christianity and Islam. Xi Jinping perceives these religions as susceptible to 'Western values' and extremism, which he considers to be a threat to his objectives.

The religious sinicization policy has three main focuses for the CCP to monitor and manage religion in China: bureaucratically, the CCP streamlines oversight of religion; ideologically, it reinforces Party influence over religious beliefs and practices; and legally, it provides the juridical framework to monitor and control the growth of religion and its influence in China. Religious Sinicization requires patriotic education and public displays of loyalty to the CCP in churches, mosques, and temples. The leaders of Christianity and Islam are expected to "align their teachings and customs with Chinese traditions and 'pledge loyalty' to the state". Thus, rather than adapting religion to Chinese culture and traditions, it is about making religions subservient to CCP ideology.

=== COVID-19 pandemic ===
On 20 January 2020, Xi commented for the first time on the emerging COVID-19 pandemic in Wuhan, and ordered "efforts to curb the spread" of the virus. He gave premier Li Keqiang some responsibility over the COVID-19 response, in what has been suggested by The Wall Street Journal was an attempt to potentially insulate himself from criticism if the response failed. The government initially responded to the pandemic with a lockdown and censorship, with the initial response causing widespread backlash within China. He met with Tedros Adhanom Ghebreyesus, the director-general of the World Health Organization (WHO), on 28 January. Der Spiegel reported that in January 2020 Xi pressured Tedros Adhanom to hold off on issuing a global warning about the outbreak of COVID-19 and hold back information on human-to-human transmission of the virus, allegations denied by the WHO. On 5 February, Xi met with Cambodian prime minister Hun Sen in Beijing, the first foreign leader allowed into China since the outbreak. After the COVID-19 outbreak got under control in Wuhan, Xi visited the city on 10 March.

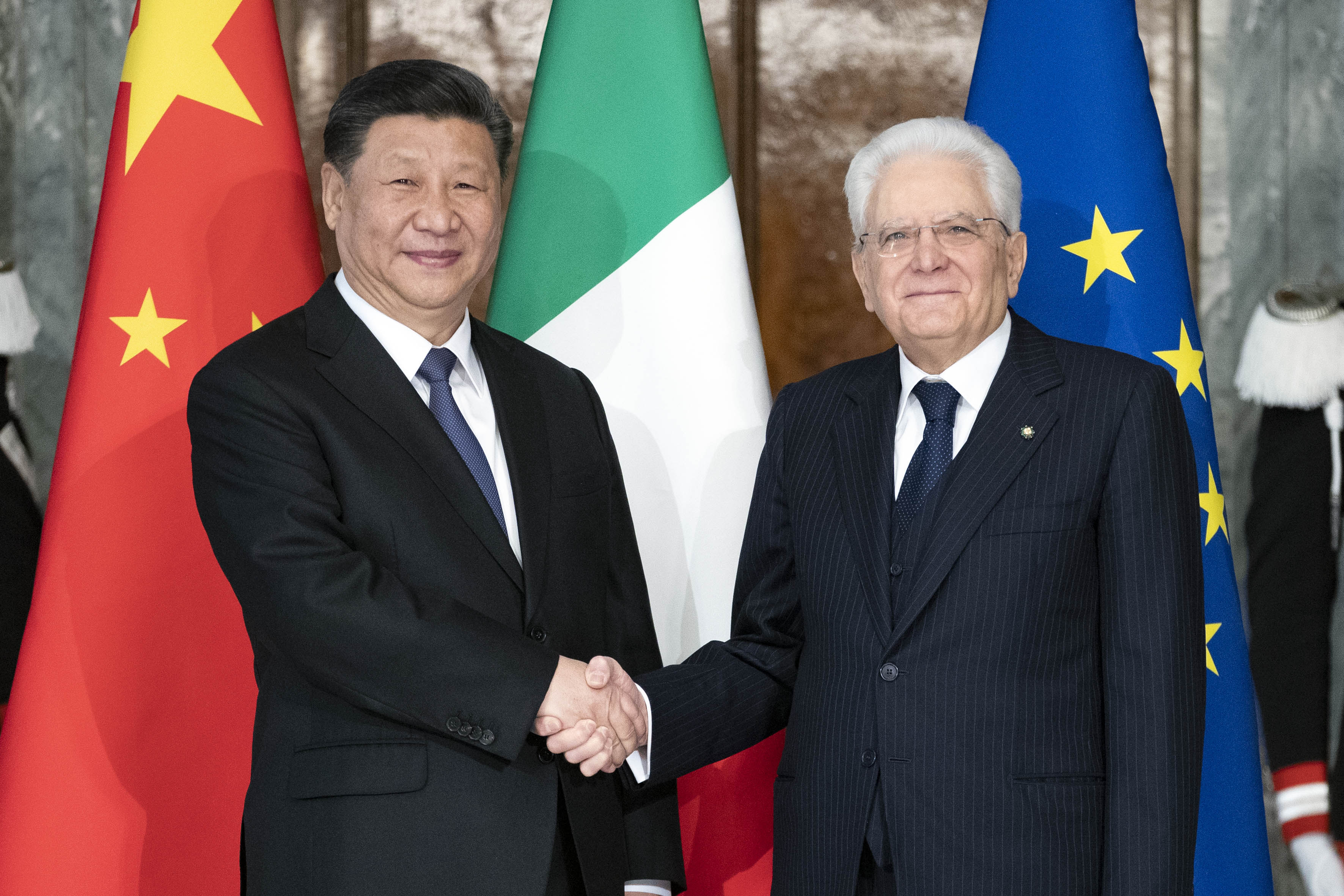
Italian president Sergio Mattarella with Xi in March 2019

After getting the outbreak in Wuhan under control, Xi has favoured what has officially been termed "dynamic zero-COVID policy" that aims to control and suppress the virus as much as possible within the country's borders. This has involved local lockdowns and mass-testing. While initially credited for China's suppression of the COVID-19 outbreak, the policy was later criticized by foreign and some domestic observers for being out of touch with the rest of the world and taking a heavy toll on the economy. This approach has especially come under criticism during a 2022 lockdown on Shanghai, which forced millions to their homes and damaged the city's economy. Conversely, Xi has said that the policy was designed to protect people's life safety. On 23 July 2022, the National Health Commission reported that Xi and other top leaders have taken the local COVID-19 vaccines.

At the 20th CCP Congress, Xi confirmed the continuation of the zero-COVID policy, stating he would "unswervingly" carry out "dynamic zero-COVID" and promising to "resolutely win the battle", though China started a limited easing of the policies in the following weeks. In November 2022, protests broke out against China's COVID-19 policies, with a fire in a high-rise apartment building in Ürümqi being the trigger. The protests were held in multiple major cities, with some of the protesters demanding the end of Xi's and the CCP's rule. The protests were mostly suppressed by December, though the government further eased COVID-19 restrictions in the time since. On 7 December 2022, China announced large-scale changes to its COVID-19 policy, including allowing quarantine at home for mild infections, reducing of PCR testing, and decreasing the power of local officials to implement lockdowns, effectively ending the zero-COVID policy.

=== Science ===
Under Xi, a series of scientific advances took place. In 2013, the Yutu rover was successfully deployed on the Moon after the Chang'e 3 lander landed on the Moon. In 2015, Tu Youyou became the first Chinese citizen (mainland) to win the Nobel Prize in Physiology or Medicine. In December 2015, the Dark Matter Particle Explorer, China's first space observatory, was successfully launched. The Tiangong-2 space laboratory was successfully launched in 2016, and in the same year the Five-hundred-meter Aperture Spherical Telescope (FAST) was built in Guizhou.
