= New type of international relations =

Concept in Chinese diplomacy

New type of international relations (Chinese: 新型国际关系; pinyin: Xīnxíng guójì guānxì) is a term used in the diplomacy of the People's Republic of China (PRC). It was proposed by the Central Committee of the Chinese Communist Party in 2013.

According to the CCP, its goal is to establish a new type of international relations with "win-win cooperation" as its core, in order to maintain world peace and promote common development. This is a generalization of the "new type of major power relations" between China and the United States proposed in 2010. The government of China claims that the new type of major power relations is a major power relationship of "no conflict, no confrontation, mutual respect, and win-win cooperation". In particular, this concept is based on the transformation of the world diplomatic landscape after the Cold War. According to the PRC, it is also a new way for rising powers and established powers to deal with conflicts and contradictions, avoiding the pattern in human history where old powers are challenged by new powers and ultimately resolve the issue through ideological confrontation or war.

== Background ==
=== New type of major power relations ===
In 2005, an article about the peaceful rise of mainland China published in the Study Times of the Central Party School mentioned the "new type of major power relations". The author described the connotation of the "new type of major power relations" as "non-alignment, non-confrontation, and non-targeting third countries."

In May 2010, during the second round of the U.S.–China Strategic and Economic Dialogue, State Councilor Dai Bingguo proposed that China and the United States should "create a new type of major power relationship in which countries with different social systems, cultural traditions and development stages respect each other, live in harmony and cooperate for mutual benefit in the era of globalization." This was the first time that China proposed the establishment of a "new type of major power relations." In February 2012, Vice President Xi Jinping visited the United States, where he proposed to "promote the China-United States cooperative partnership to make new progress and strive to shape the two countries' cooperative partnership into a new type of major power relationship in the 21st century".

=== Responses from the United States ===
Reactions from the United States to the term was not positive. U.S. officials did not take the initiative to use the term, and the meaning seemed to be different from what China expressed. During the Barack Obama administration, the United States was deeply suspicious of China's "new type of major power relationship" and wanted to keep a distance from it. U.S. officials believed that there were differences in the recognition of core interests between the two sides, and pointed out that the United States could not know exactly whether the scope of China's core interests included only sovereignty claims over Taiwan, Tibet and Xinjiang, or included sovereignty disputes with Japan in the East China Sea and sovereignty disputes with Southeast Asian countries in the South China Sea. The United States believed that the subtext of China's proposal of a "new type of major power relationship" was to ask the United States to recognize China's great power status, and even to "stand on an equal footing" with the United States to some extent. If the United States accepted China's proposal, it might lead to a "downgrading" of relations with other countries.

== New type of international relations ==
On March 23, 2013, General Secretary and President Xi Jinping delivered a speech entitled "Following the Trend of the Times and Promoting World Peace and Development" at the Moscow State Institute of International Relations during his visit to Russia. In his speech, Xi proposed "establishing a new type of international relations with win-win cooperation at its core". He said: "The world trend is unstoppable. If we follow it, we will prosper; if we go against it, we will perish. To keep up with the pace of the times, we cannot have our bodies in the 21st century while our minds remain in the past, in the old era of colonial expansion, in the old framework of Cold War thinking and zero-sum games . All countries should jointly promote the establishment of a new type of international relations with win-win cooperation at its core, and the people of all countries should work together to safeguard world peace and promote common development."

At the Central Foreign Affairs Work Conference held in November 2014, Xi Jinping said: "We must adhere to win-win cooperation, promote the establishment of a new type of international relations with win-win cooperation at the core, adhere to an open strategy of mutual benefit and win-win, and embody the concept of win-win cooperation in all aspects of foreign cooperation such as politics, economy, security, and culture." This was a clear statement of this concept at the country's highest-level foreign affairs work conference.
