= Data Security Law of the People's Republic of China =

Standing Committee of the National People's Congress
- Long title: Data Security Law of the People's Republic of China
- Citation: Data Security Law of the PRC (English)
- Territorial extent: People's Republic of China but excludes China's Special Administrative Regions.
- Enacted by: 13th National People's Congress
- Enacted: June 10, 2021
- Commenced: September 1, 2021

Related legislation
- National Intelligence Law, Cybersecurity Law, National Security Law (China)

Summary
- A law is formulated in order to standardize data handling activities, ensure data security, promote data development and use, protect the lawful rights and interests of individuals and organizations, and safeguard national sovereignty, security, and development interests.

Keywords
- Cybersecurity, National Security, Cyber sovereignty
- Status: In force

The Data Security Law of the People's Republic of China (Chinese: 中华人民共和国数据安全法; pinyin: Zhōnghuá rénmín gònghéguó shùjù ānquán fǎ; referred to as the Data Security Law or DSL) governs the creation, use, storage, transfer, and exploitation of data within China. The law is seen to be primarily targeted at technology companies which have grown increasingly powerful in China over the years. The law is part of a series of interlocking but related national security legislation including the National Security Law of the People's Republic of China, Cybersecurity Law and National Intelligence Law, passed during Xi Jinping's administration as part of efforts to strengthen national security.

== Background ==
In 2018, the United States adopted the CLOUD Act, which allows United States law enforcement to obtain data stored by United States-based companies outside of the United States. Numerous countries responded with measures to keep data located in their own borders. In China, the Data Security Law was part of the response to the extraterritorial reach of the CLOUD Act or similar foreign laws.

== Provisions ==
The Data Security Law classifies data into different categories and establishes corresponding levels of protection. The law protects core data with data localization requirements, and broadly defines core data to include data related to national and economic security, citizens' welfare, significant public interests, and important data. The Data Security Law mandates that data transfer to foreign law enforcement or judicial agencies requires official approval.

In addition, foreign judicial authorities are prohibited from requesting data on Chinese citizens without first seeking permission from Chinese authorities.

Article 36: The competent authorities of the PRC are to handle foreign justice or law enforcement institution requests for the provision of data, according to relevant laws and treaties or agreements concluded or participated in by the PRC, or in accordance with the principle of equality and reciprocity. Domestic organizations and individuals must not provide data stored within the mainland territory of the PRC to the justice or law enforcement institutions of foreign countries without the approval of the competent authorities of the PRC.

The law directs state agencies to "standardize data transaction behavior, and cultivate a data transaction market".

On September 28, 2023, the Cyberspace Administration of China (CAC) issued draft Provisions on the Regulation and Promotion of Cross-Border Data Flows. In the draft, CAC stated no government oversight is needed for data exports if regulators haven't stipulated that it qualifies as "important."

The Provisions on Promoting and Regulating Cross-Border Data Flows became effective in March 2024. These provisions aim to integrate obligations across the Cybersecurity Law, the Data Security Law, and the Personal Information Protection Law. Among other measures, it in certain circumstances it requires a CAC-led review of data exports across China's borders.

== Reactions ==
Carolyn Bigg of law firms DLA Piper Hong Kong stated that the law represents: "another important piece in the overall data protection regulatory jigsaw in China", making it: "complex" and "increasingly onerous" for international businesses to navigate through. Chinese technology company stocks fell in reaction to the passing of the law while tech companies such as Meituan, Alibaba and Ant Financial were all placed under regulatory scrutiny prior to its passing. The law is seen to have wide-ranging implications and is seen as another step in the increasing lawfare between China and the United States in areas of trade, intellectual property and national security since the beginning of the US-China trade war which began in 2016.

The German Research Foundation, the Swedish Research Council, and the Swiss National Science Foundation have all avoided co-funding projects in China since the law went into effect in 2021 due to fears of breaching what some consider the law's vaguely defined provisions.

== See also ==
- Personal Information Protection Law of the People's Republic of China
- Cybersecurity Law of the People's Republic of China
