= Hosuk Lee-Makiyama =

Swedish diplomat

Hosuk Lee-Makiyama is a Brussels-based economist, trade lawyer and foreign policy commentator. He has written on subjects primarily relating to international trade, digital economy, intellectual property, World Trade Organization (WTO) and European Union-Asia relations, especially with China, Japan and Korea.

Lee-Makiyama has publicly supported the EU's attempt to conclude bilateral free trade agreements with large trading blocs, and with economies in Asia. He is also renowned as an authority on electronic commerce, and was the first author to question the legality of internet censorship under WTO rules, and so far the only scholar to have argued the case in a Chinese academic journal. Lee-Makiyama was nominated in 2012 by the readers of The Guardian newspaper as 'one of the 20 most influential people in the open internet's history'. He has also proposed a new trade agreement, International Digital Economy Agreement (IDEA), to replace the WTO's Information Technology Agreement (proposed by the European Commission to the WTO members in 2012).

He is currently active as director of the European Centre for International Political Economy (ECIPE). He also served as an advisor of the Swedish Ministry of Foreign Affairs, and represented the EU member states in the WTO and the United Nations.

He regularly comments in European, US and Chinese media.
