= National Security Education Day =

- Observed by: China
- Significance: Day to enhance the national security awareness
- Date: 15 April
- Next time: 15 April 2026
- Frequency: Annual
- First time: 1 July 2015

National Security Education Day is a holiday in China established in order to enhance the awareness of the citizens of the People's Republic of China on safeguarding national security. On 1 July 2015, the Standing Committee of the National People's Congress passed the new National Security Law of the People's Republic of China, Article 14 of which stipulates that April 15 of each year is the National Security Education Day.

== History ==
Since Xi Jinping became the general secretary of the Chinese Communist Party and the top leader in November 2012, he has attached great importance to national security. He established the National Security Commission, which is led by the Party General Secretary himself. At the first plenary meeting of the National Security Commission, he put forward the holistic national security concept. Subsequently, the NPC Standing Committee actively promoted the legislation of the new National Security Law to replace the old National Security Law passed in 1993. In order to better publicize and promote the holistic national security concept, the NPCSC stipulated that April 15 of each year would be the National Security Education Day when formulating the new National Security Law.

== Hong Kong ==
On 15 April 2021, the first National Security Education Day, Hong Kong's disciplined forces marched together in Chinese style for the first time

15 April 2021 was the first "National Security Education Day" after the implementation of the Hong Kong National Security Law. The opening ceremony of the "National Security Education Day 2021" was held in the Grand Hall of the Hong Kong Convention and Exhibition Centre on the morning of the same day. The education day was hosted by the Committee for Safeguarding National Security and the theme was "National Security, Protecting Our Homeland - Improving the Electoral System and Implementing Patriots Governing Hong Kong". It aimed to "enhance the national security awareness of all Hong Kong citizens, create a strong atmosphere for safeguarding national security, and enhance the ability to prevent and resist security risks". The Hong Kong National Security Law stipulates that Hong Kong has the constitutional responsibility to safeguard national security and should perform its duties to safeguard national security, and that it should carry out national security education to enhance the national security awareness and law-abiding awareness of Hong Kong residents.

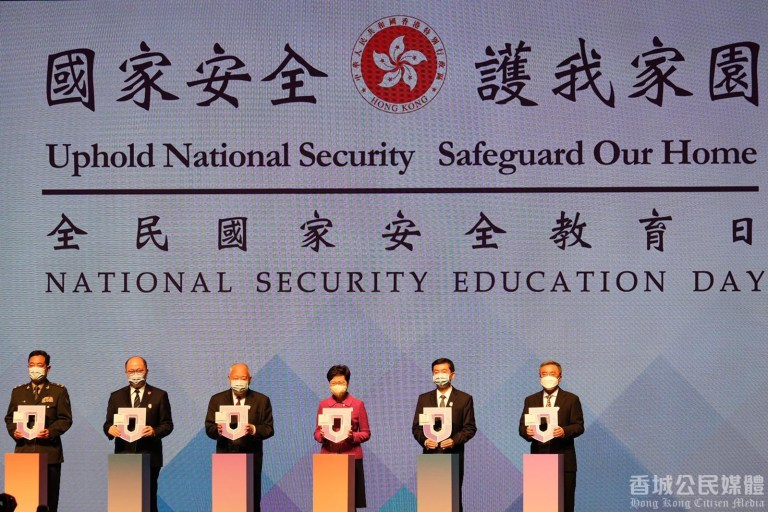
National Security Education Day in Hong Kong, 2021
