= China's core interests =

Chinese Communist Party slogan

China's core interests (Chinese: 中国核心利益; pinyin: Zhōngguó Héxīn Lìyì) is a term used by the Chinese Communist Party (CCP) to signify issues that are non-negotiable parts of foreign and domestic policy of the People's Republic of China.

== History ==
The term was first coined by the Chinese Communist Party (CCP) in 2003 in a discussion of Taiwan independence. The term's definition was expanded to include Tibet and Xinjiang in 2006. In July 2009, CCP's Central Foreign Affairs Leading Group Office Director Dai Bingguo gave remarks at the U.S.–China Strategic and Economic Dialogue, expanding the definition to define the primary goals that determine the country's foreign policy choices. The core interests are: maintaining the power of the Chinese Communist Party, continuing China's social and economic growth, and preservation of China's sovereignty and territorial integrity. China also views these core interests as red lines that other countries' behavior should not cross.

White Paper on China's Peaceful Development, released by the Chinese government in 2011, also confirmed the expanding definition. The white paper defined China's core interests as national sovereignty, national security, territorial integrity, national unity, stability of the political system and society in line with the constitution, and sustainable socio-economic development. The National Security Law of the People's Republic of China, which took into effect in 2015, defined the core interests as "the political regime; the sovereignty, unity and territorial integrity of the nation; and people’s livelihoods, sustainable economic development of society and other major interests". The new definition also includes any sovereignty issues of importance such as the South China Sea, the Arunachal Pradesh and the Senkaku Islands dispute as a "core interest". China considers the Taiwan question to be the core of China's core interests.
