= National Security Law of the People's Republic of China =

Chinese law

Standing Committee of the National People's Congress
- Long title: National Security Law of the People's Republic of China
- Citation: National Security Law (English)
- Territorial extent: People's Republic of China but excludes China's Special Administrative Regions.
- Enacted by: Standing Committee of the National People's Congress
- Enacted: July 1, 2015
- Commenced: July 1, 2015

Related legislation
- National Intelligence Law, Cybersecurity Law, Hong Kong National Security Law, Anti-Secession Law

Summary
- A law formulated on the basis of the Constitution to maintain national security, the people's democratic dictatorship, the socialist system with Chinese characteristics, the fundamental interests of the people, ensure the smooth implementation of reform and opening up, establishment of socialist modernization and the realization of the great rejuvenation of the Chinese nation

Keywords
- National Security, Intelligence
- Status: In force

National Security Law of the People's Republic of China
- Simplified Chinese: 中华人民共和国国家安全法
- Traditional Chinese: 中華人民共和國國家安全法
Transcriptions
Standard Mandarin
- Hanyu Pinyin: Zhōnghuá Rénmín Gònghéguó Guójiā'ānquán Fǎ

The National Security Law of the People's Republic of China (中华人民共和国国家安全法) is a law of China issued on July 1, 2015. It is part of a series of laws implemented under Chinese Communist Party General Secretary Xi Jinping's administration as part of efforts to strengthen national security. In July 2020, a similar law, the Hong Kong national security law, took effect.

== History ==
The law was enacted by the Standing Committee of the National People's Congress on July 1, 2015, and implemented on the same date. The law is part of a series of laws implemented under Chinese Communist Party General Secretary Xi Jinping's administration as part of efforts to strengthen national security. After its passage, Alan Leong, a pro-democracy lawmaker in Hong Kong, told the broadcaster RTHK that the law "can be considered as giving pressure to Hong Kong" to enact its own security law.

== Content ==
In Article 2, the National Security Law states that the protection of national security means the protection of national unity. It defines China's core interests and specifies that "national security refers to the relative absence of international or domestic threats to the state’s power to govern, sovereignty, unity and territorial integrity, the welfare of the people, sustainable economic and social development and other major national interests, and the ability to ensure a continued state of security".

Article 14 stipulates that April 15 of each year is the National Security Education Day. Article 15 states that "the State persists in the leadership of the Chinese Communist Party". Article 23 addresses the concept of cultural security. According to article 23, the state shall develop advanced socialist culture, practice socialist core values, resist harmful culture, maintain its ideological dominance, and increase its cultural competitiveness.

== Reactions ==
Annette Lu, the former vice president of Taiwan, said that the law is an offense to Taiwan, and some people from Hong Kong have expressed concern about their safety while in the mainland China after it was issued.

== See also ==
- National Security Commission of the Chinese Communist Party
