= Counterespionage Law of the People's Republic of China =

2014 law in China

Standing Committee of the National People's Congress
- Passed by: Standing Committee of the National People's Congress
- Passed: 1 November 2014
- Commenced: 1 November 2014

Legislative history
- Introduced by: State Council
- First reading: 25–31 August 2014
- Second reading: 27 October–1 November 2014

Repeals
- National Security Law of the People's Republic of China
- Status: In force

Counterespionage Law of the People's Republic of China
- Simplified Chinese: 中华人民共和国反间谍法
- Traditional Chinese: 中華人民共和國反間諜法
Transcriptions
Standard Mandarin
- Hanyu Pinyin: Zhōnghuá Rénmín Gònghéguó Fǎn Jiàndié Fǎ

The Counterespionage Law of the People's Republic of China was passed by the Standing Committee of the National People's Congress on 1 November 2014 came into effect on that day. It was revised on 26 April 2023, which came into effect on 1 July 2023.

== Legislative history ==
The draft of the Counterespionage Law of the People's Republic of China was first reviewed at the 10th meeting of the Standing Committee of the 12th National People's Congress on August 25, 2014; the draft was reviewed again at the 11th meeting of the NPCSC on October 28 of the same year. The law was formally passed at the 11th meeting of the NPCSC on November 1 of the same year. This is the first time that China has legally identified specific espionage activities.

Counterespionage Law of the People's Republic of China

On April 10, 2017, the Beijing Municipal State Security Bureau issued and implemented the "Measures for Rewarding Citizens for Reporting Spy Activities" in accordance with this law. "Those who play a particularly important role in preventing and stopping espionage activities or solving espionage cases and provide particularly outstanding clues will be awarded a reward of 100,000 to 500,000 yuan." The term "walking 500,000" derived from this is also used by the Central Committee of the Communist Youth League of China to refer to spies. On 22 November 2017, the State Council promulgated the Implementation Rules of the Counterespionage Law of the People's Republic of China.

On 26 April 2023, the Second Session of the Standing Committee of the 14th National People's Congress adopted the revised Counterespionage Law of the People's Republic of China, which came into effect on 1 July 2023.

== Provisions ==
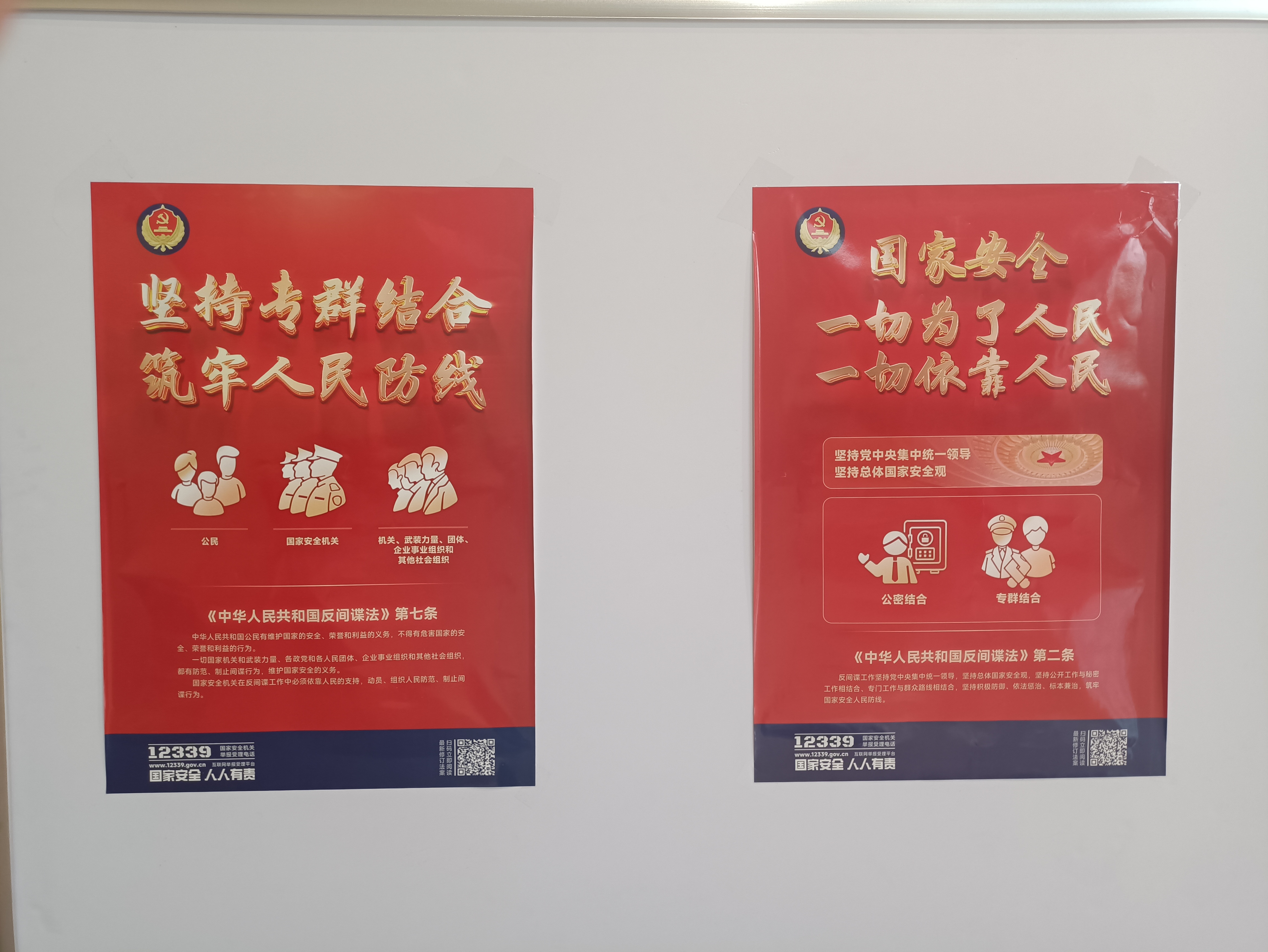
An advertisement for the Counterespionage Law of the People's Republic of China posted by Xiamen Library

The law defines six types of activities as espionage activities:

1. Activities endangering national security, domestically or abroad, that are instigated, supported, or carried out by espionage organizations or their collaborators.
2. Participation in an espionage organization or accepting tasks from one; or seeking to align with an espionage organization.
3. Attempts to illegally obtain or share state secrets, intelligence, or other data, materials, or items related to national security or national interests, which are carried out by or for foreign elements other than espionage organizations.
4. Network attacks, intrusions, or disruptions targeting critical information infrastructure or entities involved with secrets.
5. Identifying targets for enemies.
6. Other acts of espionage.

Article 8 states that "All citizens and organizations shall support and assist counter-espionage efforts in accordance with law, and shall protect state secrets and secrets of counter-espionage efforts that they are aware of." Article 28 allows state security bodies to summon individuals for questioning. Article 33 authorizes the Ministry of State Security to prohibit the exit of Chinese or foreign individuals who endanger national security.
