= Grid-style social management in China =

Police state system in China

Grid-style social management (Chinese: 社会网格化管理; pinyin: Shèhuì Wǎnggé Huà Guǎnlǐ) is a mass surveillance system used in China for what the Chinese Communist Party (CCP) terms "stability maintenance."

Launched in 2004, grid-style social management covers all of China. The grid-style social management process consists in subdividing a country's counties into smaller zones, and assign each zone to a person that reports all activity to the local government on a regular basis. The grid-style social manager is expected to report on the population size in the area, housing and facilities, social organizations, among other things, as well as mediate local disputes, take on social responsibilities and ensure social stability.

== History ==
Grid-style social management in China was first mentioned in Shanghai in 2004, promoted by then Shanghai CCP Committee Secretary Chen Liangyu. The China National Grid project (CNGrid) was first implemented as a trial in Dongcheng District, Beijing in 2004, and coincided with the abolition of the agricultural tax in 2004 which reduced the power of local governments in China. The pilot project was launched in the Dongcheng District, where the district's 205 communities were subdivided into 589-part grid. 120,000 community watchers were enrolled. In December 2005, the authorities launched the China Grid Computing Center was officially formed to lead and manage the CNGrid. Eventually, test watchers were equipped with mobile devices designed for reporting and communications. Authorities also started to apply a multi-layer model in areas with denser populations.

From 2004 to 2007, the program was rolled out to 51 new areas. In 2011, China pre-launched the program nationwide to monitor sensitive areas and ensure social stability. Grid-style management further increased into prominence under Xi Jinping. In 2015, the grid-style social management system was rolled out to the whole country. It is perceived as a substitute to the former community-driven social compounds composing the country's social order that faded away with the growth of the country's mega-cities. The Chinese government response to COVID-19 entailed a major expansion of grid-style social management. During the pandemic, Chinese authorities revealed more than 4.5 million grid workers were engaged in implementing the quarantine rules.

== Functions ==
The grid-style social management process consists in subdividing a country's counties into smaller zones, and assign each zone to a person that reports all activity to the local government on a regular basis. China is divided into a nearly million separate grids. This model is applied in rural areas and cities. In cities, a person may be assigned to a specific number of households. The grid-style social manager is expected to report on the population size in the area, housing and facilities, social organizations, among other things. They are also tasked with patrolling residential areas and documenting security hazards and damage, conducting license and safety checks on business enterprises, cracking down on illegal parking, keeping records on residents and supporting the police in joint checks on residents and businesses, mediating disputes between complaints and neighbors, organizing public education on regulations, important events and new ideological campaigns, and checking on "residents of interest". This system aims to solve issues ranging from welfare, administrative services, dispute mediation, monitoring residents and reporting on suspicious activities and political dissent directly at the administrative level, as locally as possible.

The number of grid-style social management people is regulated to ensure it is three times the size of local governments in human resources. The reporters are paid by their local government, usually between ¥2,000 and ¥4,000 a month (and rewards for exceptional reporting), though richer localities pay between ¥5,400 and ¥5,600. Managers become beneficiaries of the state insurance, but receive no specific training, though they should theoretically get training courses and be supported by volunteers. In rural areas, taxi drivers and sanitation workers are often hired as watchers. Grid-style social management watchers wear a red armband. The grid-style social management system is connected to the authorities' CCTV cameras and police databases to achieve enhanced surveillance. The China Grid Computing Center divides 25.38 square kilometers into 1,652 single geographic grid cells of 100 square meters. Each single cell is assigned a unique 14-digit code.

== Analysis ==
Despite its advanced technological surveillance systems, the CCP relies on its grid-style social management system to identify new threats, an area where technology is still shy compared to human surveillance. It has been described by Wu Qiang as a model for a contemporary police state. When implementing the grid-style social management network, the Chinese government did not develop a community-outreach strategy to make its local agents part of the local life. Thus locals tend to perceive grid-style social managers as spies of the central government. Some scholars have also expressed their concerns regarding the right to personal privacy, and the potential risks of giving untrained individuals extralegal authority. Officials reply that the system is legal, and that its watchers' report are genuinely true.

Humanitarian NGOs are also concerned about the implementation of the grid-style social management system in regions such as Tibet where the Chinese government has been historically oppressive. The situation also became critical in Xinjiang where humanitarian NGOs have reported that a biological database to track Uyghurs' DNA had been developed by the authorities and integrated within its grid-style surveillance system.

== See also ==
- Grid plan
- Mass line
- Neighborhood watch
- Village (Taiwan)
