= Eastern Theater Command's Military Court =

Military court of China

People's Liberation Army's Military Court (中国人民解放军东部战区军事法院)
- Established: 2016
- Jurisdiction: Chinese Armed Forces
- Location: Nanjing
- Authorised by: Organic Law of the People's Courts of the People's Republic of China
- Appeals to: Military High Court
- Website: www.chinacourt.org/article/dfg/type/military/ismilitary/1.shtml

People's Liberation Army Eastern Theater Command Military Court
- 中国人民解放军东部战区军事法院
- PLA's Emblem
- Founded: 2016
- Country: People's Republic of China
- Branch: Jurisdiction over all military branches within the Eastern Theater Command
- Role: Military Justice administration

Commanders
- Court President: Jiang Liuqing (蒋柳清)

The Military Court of the Eastern Theater Command of the Chinese People's Liberation Army, normally called the ETC Court is an intermediate military court of division grade of the People's Liberation Army, in charge of military justice in the Eastern Theater. It is subordinate to the Military High Court and located in Nanjing.

== History ==
The precursor of the ETC Court was the Military Court of the Nanjing Military Region of the Chinese People's Liberation Army, classified as a "large unit military court". The Military Court of the Nanjing Military Region heard some serious criminal and civil cases in first instance and heard in second instance cases involving the forces, colleges and universities, and other units of the Nanjing Military Region. In civil cases, it heard complaints, and supervised lower level trials and the enforcement of judgments.

In November 2015, Xi Jinping requested at the Military Commission Reform Work Conference that "a new Military Commission should be formed, the military judicial system should be adjusted, and military courts and procuratorates should be set up in each region, ensuring that they exercise their powers independently and impartially in accordance with the law." On February 1, 2016, the Eastern Theater Command was established, which included the former Nanjing Military Region. On June 29, 2016, the Supreme People's Court of the People's Republic of China issued the "Notice on Rewriting and Publishing the Hierarchy of Military Courts" (Law No. 142), which established that the Military Court of the Eastern Theater is an Intermediate Military Court with the code "Military 01" (军01).

== Functions ==
The ETC Military Court of the Chinese People's Liberation Army has a case-filing division that does the initial review, induction, and preliminary hearings of new cases. The criminal chamber hears in first instance cases liable to sentences over 15 years of imprisonment or death; and hears appeals against criminal judgments and rulings of primary military courts. The civil division carries out trial supervision, and hears cases and complaints when the defendants are military units, and the suit is over 30 million yuan; and hears appeals against primary court judgments and rulings in civil cases. The civil division is also responsible for the enforcement of judgments in civil cases.

== Organizational structure ==
- Case-filing Division (立案庭)
- Civil Division (民事审判庭)
- Criminal Division (刑事审判庭)
- Judicial Supervision Division (审判监督庭)

== Leadership ==
Court president:

- Jiang Liuqing (蒋柳清) Sr Col（2016年—）

Court Vice-president

- [[]]（2016年—）

== Subordinate primary military courts ==
- Shanghai Military Court
- Nanjing Military Court
- Hangzhou Military Court
- Hefei Military Court
- Fuzhou Military Court

== See also ==
- Judicial system of China
