= Military court (China) =

People's Liberation Army's Military Court (中国人民解放军军事法院)
- Established: 1952
- Jurisdiction: Chinese Armed Forces
- Location: Beijing
- Authorised by: Organic Law of the People's Courts of the People's Republic of China
- Appeals to: Supreme People's Court
- Website: www.chinacourt.org/article/dfg/type/military/ismilitary/1.shtml

People's Liberation Army Military High Court
- 中国人民解放军军事法院
- PLA's Emblem
- Founded: 1952
- Country: People's Republic of China
- Branch: Unified jurisdiction over all branches of the PLA and the PAP
- Role: Military Justice administration

Commanders
- Chief Judge: Rear Admiral Cheng Dongfang (程东方)

The Military Court of the People's Liberation Army (also referred to as the Military High Court of the PLA) is the highest level military court of the Chinese armed forces (including the PLA and the People's Armed Police). It is a Deputy Theater grade (副战区级) unit organized under dual subordination: administratively under the direct supervision of the Political and Legal Commission of the Central Military Commission, and operationally as a Specialized People's Court under the jurisdiction of the Supreme People's Court.

== History ==
=== Before 1954 ===
On September 1, 1931, the Soviet Government of the EYUAN District promulgated the Provisional Regulations of the Revolutionary Military Tribunal, which stated that "the Revolutionary Military Tribunal is the military law enforcement organ of the Revolutionary Armed Forces, and shall deal with any breach of discipline and military administration of the Chinese Red Army (all revolutionary armed forces)." On February 1, 1932, the Central Executive Committee of the Chinese Soviet Republic unified and promulgated the Provisional Regulations on the Organization of the Military Courts of the Chinese Soviet Republic, which provided that "the troops of the Red Army at all levels and the local armed commands shall organize military courts to try criminal cases in the Red Army."

After the outbreak of the Second Sino-Japanese War and the reorganization of the Chinese Workers and Peasants Red Army into the Eighth Route Army in August 1937, the Military Inquisition was changed to the Military Justice Division, which was set up within the Political Department of the Eighth Route Army. In 1939, the Political Department of the Eighth Route Army issued the Draft Regulations on the Work of the Military Justice Division, which stipulated that the Military Justice Division was to be established within the political departments of divisions, brigades, military districts, military subdivisions, and rear garrisons.

During the Chinese Civil War, military law offices continued to be established in the army, generally in the command or political department of troops above the brigade (sub-district), with the chief of staff, the director of the political department, or the chief of the defense department (division), or in some cases, the military and political chief of the army. At the beginning of the founding of the People's Republic of China, troops continued to have a Military Law Division, and when the troops were integrated in 1952, the Military Law Division was placed in a separate sequence, led by both the CCP Committee and the military and political chiefs at the same level, and under the leadership of the Military Law Division at a higher level.

=== 1954-1969 ===
In January 1954, the People's Revolutionary Military Commission of the Central People's Government decided to establish the Military Tribunal of the PLA to unify the management of military trials throughout the army. Chen Qihan was appointed by the Central Military Commission as the President of the Military Tribunal of the PLA. in September 1954, the First Session of the 1st National People's Congress adopted the 1954 Constitution of China and the Organic Law of the People's Courts of the People's Republic of China, which provided for the establishment of specialized people's courts. In accordance with the above-mentioned laws, on November 1, 1954, the Military Commission of the Central Committee of the Chinese Communist Party (CCP) promulgated the establishment table of military courts, renaming the Military Tribunal of the PLA as the Military Court of the PLA. on August 31, 1955, in accordance with the Constitution of the People's Republic of China and the Organic Law of the People's Courts of the People's Republic of China, the Ministry of National Defense issued the Notice on the Change of the Name of the Military Law Offices at All Levels of the Army The Notice on the Change of Military Law Offices at All Levels of the Army to Military Courts", which renamed the Military Law Offices at all levels of the PLA as Military Courts, thus incorporating them into the national judiciary system and stipulating that the Military Courts were organizationally part of the military establishment and led by the CCP Committee of the Army; and were under the supervision of the Supreme People's Court in terms of judging work. Military courts are set up at four levels: (1) military courts of the PLA; (2) military courts of major military regions, naval forces, air forces, public security forces, railway troops, and PLA General Headquarters; (3) military courts of armies, provincial military districts, police districts, military air forces, and naval fleets; and (4) military courts of divisions and the equivalent of divisions of various military branches, services, military subdivisions, and bases.

At the 92nd meeting of the CCP Central Military Commission on December 6, 1956, on the recommendation of the Supreme People's Court, it was decided that the Military Court of the PLA would be renamed the Military Trial Chamber of the Supreme People's Court. on April 3, 1957, the 55th meeting of the Standing Committee of the 1st National People's Congress appointed Chen Qihan as Vice President of the Supreme People's Court and Zhong Hanhua as Military Trial Chamber, and Yuan Guang as vice president.

In June 1957, the General Political Department of the PLA, in accordance with the decision of the enlarged meeting of the Military Commission of the CCP Central Committee and with the consent of the Supreme People's Court, stipulated that military courts at all levels, in addition to being supervised by higher courts in accordance with the law, were under the leadership of the political departments of the same level within the army. In 1958, under the slogan of Anti-Rightist Movement, Encourage Energy, and Promote Great Leap Forward in Military Justice Work," the military justice system continued to crack down on a wide range of cases, and the conviction rate increased sharply. After 1958, according to the "Regulations on Strengthening Collaboration among the Three Departments of Defense, Military Prosecution and Military Justice" formulated and issued by the Defense Department of the General Political Department of the PLA, the Military Trial Chamber of the Supreme People's Court, and the Military Prosecutor's Office of the Supreme People's Procuratorate, during the "Great Leap Forward" campaign, the military trial work During the "Great Leap Forward" movement, the system of division of responsibilities among the defense, military prosecution, and military justice departments, mutual cooperation, and mutual restraint was replaced by "one chief in place of three chiefs" (any one of the three chiefs of the defense, prosecution, and military justice departments could act for the other two chiefs), "one member in place of three members" (any one of the scouts, prosecutors, and judges could act for the other two chiefs), and "one member in place of three members" (the scouts, prosecutors, and judges). This is the same trend as the local trial work of the Public Security Bureau, the Procuratorate, and the courts, which were responsible for the division of labor, cooperation, and mutual restraint, was replaced by "one chief for three chiefs" and "one member for three members". In some military trials, court trials were combined with mass criticism, and defendants were completely deprived of their right to defense. These practices have led to great problems in military trials.

On January 16, 1961, the General Political Department of the PLA issued the Notice on the Co-location of the Three Departments of Defense, Military Prosecution, and Military Justice, in which the three departments of defense, military prosecution, and military justice at all levels of the army were reduced to one office each, following the model of the co-location of the Ministry of Public Security, the Supreme People's Court, and the Supreme People's Procuratorate of the People's Republic of China, and were placed under the control of the defense department, while still retaining the names of the three departments externally. On May 24, 1962, the Ministry of National Defense issued the "Table of the Basic Organizational System of the Major Military Regions", which separated the military courts from the defense department and restored them to a separate organization. On September 3, 1962, the three departments of defense, military prosecution, and military justice were officially separated. Later, Tan Furen was appointed by the Central Military Commission as the head of the Military Trial Court of the Supreme People's Court. By the end of 1964, the military judiciary was basically restored, and on May 29, 1965, the Military Court of the Supreme People's Court was renamed the "Military Court of the Chinese People's Liberation Army". There were four levels of military courts: (1) military courts of the PLA; (2) military courts of major military regions, navy, air force, and public security forces; (3) military courts of military air forces and naval fleets; (4) military courts of provincial military districts, field armies and military-level (corps-level) bases, fortress districts, police (garrison) districts and air force and naval bases, and military subdivisions of border defense.

=== 1969-1978 ===
During the Cultural Revolution, the system and principles of the military court system were again criticized. in November 1968, the military courts of the PLA were placed under military control. at the end of 1969, the military courts of the PLA and military courts at all levels throughout the army were abolished one after another. The authority of the military courts was exercised by the defense departments in the name of the military courts. The security departments of units above the military level all held an official seal of the military court with the same number as the unit. In cases where penalties were to be imposed, the defense department would report the verdict in the name of the military court and publish it after verification and approval by the CCP committee.

=== 1978-2016 ===
In January 1978, the Central Military Commission of the CCP issued the "Adjustment Plan for the Military System" and decided to rebuild the Military Court of the PLA and the military courts of major units. In November 1979, with the approval of the CCP Central Military Commission, the General Staff Department and the General Political Department of the PLA jointly issued a circular deciding to re-establish military courts and military procuratorates at the corps and military levels, with their establishment in the political department. In September 1982, the Central Military Commission issued a notice on the streamlining and integration program of the military system reform, in order to make the system of military courts and military prosecutors the same as that of local courts and prosecutors. same, it was stipulated that military courts and military procuratorates were reorganized into three levels: (1) military courts of the PLA and military procuratorates of the PLA; (2) military courts and military procuratorates of major military districts, naval forces, and air forces; and (3) military courts and military procuratorates of provincial military districts, naval fleets, and air forces in military districts. In 1985, in the midst of the Million Disarmament, the military courts and military procuratorates of military-level units of the army were abolished and replaced by the setting up of grassroots military courts and military procuratorates of the army by piece, according to the notice of the General Staff Department of the PLA.

The 1982 Constitution of China and the 1983 Organic Law of the People's Courts of the People's Republic of China provide that the state establishes military courts within the PLA. There are three levels of military courts: military courts of the PLA, military courts of military district-level units, and military courts of corps and military-level units. The military courts of the PLA are responsible to the Central Military Commission of the People's Republic of China and the General Political Department of the PLA, and the military courts of other levels are responsible to the political organs at their own levels. The trial work of military courts at all levels is supervised by the Supreme People's Court of the People's Republic of China, and the trial work of military courts at lower levels is supervised by military courts at higher levels. The President of the Military Court of the PLA shall be appointed and removed by the President of the Supreme People's Court upon request of the Standing Committee of the National People's Congress.

In January 1983, the Military Affairs Department of the General Staff Department and the Organization Department of the General Political Department of the PLA issued the Circular on the Establishment of Primary Courts, which provided that the military courts of provincial military districts had jurisdiction over criminal cases occurring within all troops stationed in the province. on June 10, 1983, the Central Military Commission issued the Regulations on the Authority to Grant Arrests and Trials, which provided that the military courts of provincial military districts had jurisdiction over persons below the rank of battalion to be In 1983, the CCP Central Committee issued the Decision on Strictly Combating Criminal Activities, and the Second Session of the Standing Committee of the Sixth National People's Congress adopted the Decision on Strictly Punishing Criminals Who Seriously Endanger Social Security and the Decision on Procedures for Speedy Trial of Criminals Who Seriously Endanger Social Security In addition, the military courts at all levels, together with the defense and procuratorial organs, carried out the "strict crackdown" policy proposed by the CCP Central Committee, which was "to deal with the seriousness and speed of the crime and to eliminate it in one go".

In 2012, the Supreme People's Court issued and implemented the Regulations on Certain Issues of Civilian Cases under the Jurisdiction of Military Courts. In 2013, the Military Court of the PLA issued the Opinions on Several Issues of Jurisdiction of Military Courts over Civil Cases, which stipulates that civil cases of first instance shall in principle be heard by the basic military courts, but the subject amount of 30 million RMB or more, or the subject amount of 20 million RMB or more, shall be considered by the military courts. or above, or cases with a subject matter of RMB 20 million or more and in which the parties belong to different large units, shall be heard by the military court of the large unit.

On May 25, 1996, in accordance with the instructions of the Central Military Commission, the People's Armed Police established two levels of military courts and military procuratorates. on July 23, 1996, the Hong Kong Garrison established military courts and military procuratorates. on October 24, 1997, the Central Military Commission approved the establishment of the Second Military Court of the General Command of the PLA and the Second Military Procuratorate of the General Command. in October 1998, the According to the provisions of the Central Military Commission documents, the establishment system and posts of military courts and military procuratorates at all levels of the army were adjusted, and there were three levels of military courts and military procuratorates in the army: (1) military courts and military procuratorates of the PLA; (2) military courts and military procuratorates of military regions, naval forces, air forces, and general direct subordinate units; and (3) basic-level military courts and military procuratorates. in July 2004, the army The establishment system and posts of military courts and military procuratorates at all levels were further adjusted, and some of the basic-level military courts and military procuratorates were abolished. In March 2014, the Second Artillery Military Court was established, exercising the authority of large-unit military courts and accepting the leadership of the Political Department of the Second Artillery and the Military Court of the PLA. Prior to January 14, 2015, Liu Jixing, president of the Military Court of the PLA, was promoted from the previous rank of full military to the rank of deputy major military region.

Before the reform in January 2016, there were 13 military courts of the People's Liberation Army corresponding to large units: the Navy, Air Force, Second Artillery, Shenyang Military Region, Beijing Military Region, Lanzhou Military Region, Jinan Military Region, Nanjing Military Region, Guangzhou Military Region, Chengdu Military Region, People's Armed Police, General Direct Subsidiaries, and the Second Military Court of General Direct Subsidiaries. Among them, the Military Court of the General Headquarters has jurisdiction over the General Office of the Military Commission, the General Political Department, the General Logistics Department, the General Equipment Department, the Second Artillery (after March 2014, the Second Artillery is no longer under the jurisdiction of the Military Court of the General Headquarters), the colleges and universities directly under the Military Commission, and other large units and their subordinate units, and the Second Military Court of the General Headquarters has jurisdiction over the General Staff Department and its subordinate units.

After the reforms, the military court system was streamlined into six circuits of primary and intermediate courts corresponding to each Theater Command (except the Western Command, which has two circuits), plus one "at large" directly subordinate circuit of primary and intermediate courts.

== Duties ==
1. To try in first instance cases of crimes committed by persons of full divisional rank or above.
2. To try foreign-related military criminal cases.
3. To try in first instance those cases authorized or designated by the Supreme People's Court, and other criminal cases that the court deems should be tried by itself.
4. To hear all appeals from lower military courts, and carry out retrials.

== Organization ==
Prior to the 2016 reform, the Military Court included three full divisional-level bodies.

1. The First Trial Division: hears appeal cases and death penalty review cases against the verdicts of military courts of major units of the military. Deadly criminal cases are also reported to the Supreme People's Court for approval after being reviewed by the Military Court of the PLA.
2. Second Trial Division: Hearing appeals against the legal effect of the judgments of the military courts of major units of the army, letters and visits, and trial supervision.
3. Civilian Trial Division: hearing cases of appeal against the judgment of the military court of major units of the army, as well as appeal cases of civil judgments that have taken legal effect; undertaking the execution of the judgment of civil cases of the army.

== Past Directors ==
President of the Military Tribunal of the PLA

1. Chen Qihan (February 1954 - November 1954)

President of the Military Court of the PLA

1. General Chen Qihan (November 1954-April 1957, part-time)

President of the Military Trial Chamber of the Supreme People's Court

1. Zhong Hanhua Lieutenant General (April 1957-January 1961)
2. Gan Weihan Lieutenant General (January 1961-May 1964, part-time; from January 1961-September 1962, head of military justice in the combined office of defense, military prosecution and military justice at the General Political Department)
3. Lieutenant General Tan Furen (December 1964-May 1965)

President of the Military Court of the PLA

1. Major General Jin Rubai (June 1965-February 1968, part-time)
2. Hao Su (September 1978-July 1981)
3. Tian Jia (September 10, 1981 - August 23, 1982)[12]
4. Liu Jiguang (August 23, 1982 - June 18, 1985)[13]
5. Major General Meng Zhongren (June 18, 1985 – June 28, 1990)
6. Major General Hou Gu (June 28, 1990 - September 2, 1993)
7. Major General Quan Zengde (September 2, 1993 - July 3, 1997)
8. Major General Jiang Jichu (July 3, 1997 - April 28, 2001)
9. Major General Qu Dacheng (April 28, 2001 - April 29, 2006)
10. Major General Su Yong (April 29, 2006 - August 26, 2011)
11. Liu Jixing Lieutenant General (August 26, 2011 - June 22, 2018)
12. Liu Ligeng Major General (June 22, 2018-)

== Subordinate Intermediate and Primary Military Courts ==
1. Eastern Theater Command's Military Court (东部战区军事法院)（军-01). Based in Nanjing
  1. Shanghai Military Court（军-0101)
  2. Nanjing Military Court（军-0102）
  3. Hangzhou Military Court (军-0103）
  4. Hefei Military Court（军0104）
  5. Fuzhou Military Court（军0105）
2. Southern Theater Command's Military Court（军02), based in Guangzhou
  1. Changsha Military Court（军0201）
  2. Guangzhou Military Court（军0202）
  3. Nanning Military Court（军0203）
  4. Haikou Military Court（军0204）
  5. Kunming Military Court（军0205）
  6. PLA Military Court in Hong Kong（军0206）
3. Western Theater Command's First Court（军03), based in Chengdu
  1. Chengdu Military Court（军0301）
  2. Lhasa Military Court（军0302）
4. Western Theater Command Second Court（军04), based in Lanzhou
  1. Lanzhou Military Court（军0401）
  2. Xining Military Court（军0402）
  3. Urumqi Military Court（军0403）
5. Northern Theater Command's Military Court（军05), based in Shenyang
  1. Hohhot Military Court（军0501）
  2. Shenyang Military Court（军0502）
  3. Harbin Military Court（军0503）
  4. Jinan Military Court 中国人民解放军济南军事法院（军0504）
6. Central Theater Command's Military Court（军06), based in Beijing
  1. Beijing Military Court（军0601）
  2. Shijiazhuang Military Court（军0602）
  3. Zhengzhou Military Court（军0603）
  4. Wuhan Military Court（军0604）
  5. Xi'an Military Court（军0605）
7. PLA's General Directly Subordinate Military Court（军07), based in Beijing
  1. Directly Subordinate Military Primary Court（军0701）

== Notable cases ==
1. 1989-1990: Major General Xu Qinxian, former commander of the 38th Group Army of the PLA, was sentenced to 5 years in prison for refusing to carry out the June 4 clearance order and served his sentence in Qincheng Prison and Public Security Hospital.
2. 1999: Major General Liu Liankun, former head of the Armament Department of the General Logistics Department (retired deputy military rank), for providing intelligence to Taiwan (death by lethal injection)
3. 1999: Senior Colonel Shao Zhengzong, former head of a division of the Armament Department of the General Logistics Department, provided intelligence spies to Taiwan (death penalty)
4. 2004: Major General Liu Guangzhi, former Director of the Air Force Command College (serving at full military rank) Providing intelligence to Taiwan (death by lethal injection)
5. 2006: Former Vice Commander of the Navy Wang Shouye, Lieutenant General of the Navy (deputy military region position) bribery case (suspended death sentence)
6. 2015: Former Vice Minister of the PLA General Logistics Department Gu Junshan Lieutenant General (Vice Military Region position) embezzlement, bribery, misappropriation of public funds, and abuse of power (death sentence suspended)
7. 2019: Former Chief of Staff of the Joint Staff Department of the former Central Military Commission, General Fang Fenghui (full military region position) case of bribery, bribery, and large amount of property of unknown origin (life imprisonment)

== See also ==
- Judicial system of China
