= Legal history of China =

The origin of the current law of the People's Republic of China can be traced back to the period of the early 1930s, during the establishment of the Chinese Soviet Republic. In 1931 the first supreme court was established. Though the contemporary legal system and laws have no direct links to traditional Chinese law, their impact and influence of historical norms still exist.

In the period between 1980 and 1987, important progress was made in replacing the rule of men with the rule of law. Laws originally passed in 1979 and earlier were amended and augmented, and law institutes and university law departments that had been closed during the Cultural Revolution were opened to train lawyers and court personnel. It was only a beginning, but important steps had been taken in developing a viable legal system and making the government and the courts answerable to an invisible standard.

== Imperial era ==
Contemporary social control is rooted in the Confucian past. The teachings of Confucius have had an enduring effect on Chinese life and have provided the basis for the social order through much of the country's history. Confucians believed in the fundamental goodness of man and advocated rule by moral persuasion in accordance with the concept of li (propriety), a set of generally accepted social values or norms of behavior. Li was enforced by society rather than by courts. Education was considered the key ingredient for maintaining order, and codes of law were intended only to supplement li, not to replace it (see Hundred Schools of Thought).

Confucians held that codified law was inadequate to provide meaningful guidance for the entire panorama of human activity, but they were not against using laws to control the most unruly elements in the society. The first criminal code was promulgated sometime between 455 and 395 BCE. There were also civil statutes, mostly concerned with land transactions.

Legalism, a competing school of thought during the Warring States period (475-221 BCE), maintained that man was by nature evil and had to be controlled by strict rules of law and uniform justice. Legalist philosophy had its greatest impact during the first imperial dynasty, the Qin (221–207 BCE).

The Han dynasty (206 BCE – CE 220) retained the basic legal system established under the Qin but modified some of the harsher aspects in line with the Confucian philosophy of social control based on ethical and moral persuasion. Most legal professionals were not only lawyers but all around legal professionals trained in philosophy and literature. The first recorded professional who served as a lawyer was Deng Xi (c.545BC - c.501BC), a criminologist who also published the "Bamboo Law", which was one of the earliest statutes in history. The local, classically trained, Confucian gentry played a crucial role as arbiters and handled all but the most serious local disputes.

In the final years of the Qing dynasty (1644–1911), reform advocates in the government implemented certain aspects of the modernized Japanese legal system, itself originally based on German judicial precedents (see Hundred Days' Reform). These efforts were short-lived and largely ineffective. China was also a site of experimentation in extraterritoriality, including via the Shanghai Mixed Court (1864–1927).

== Republican China ==
Following the overthrow of the Qing dynasty in 1911, China came under the control of rival warlords and had no government strong enough to establish a legal code to replace the Qing code. Finally, in 1927, Chiang Kai-shek's Nationalist forces were able to suppress the warlords and gain control of most of the country (see Republican China). Established in Nanjing, the Nationalist government attempted to develop Western-style legal and penal systems. Few of the Kuomintang codes, however, were implemented nationwide. Although government leaders were striving for a Western-inspired system of codified law, the traditional Chinese preference for collective social sanctions over impersonal legalism hindered constitutional and legal development. The spirit of the new laws never penetrated to the grass-roots level or provided hoped-for stability. Ideally, individuals were to be equal before the law, but this premise proved to be more rhetorical than substantive. In the end, most of the new laws were discarded as the Nationalist government became preoccupied with the Communist forces and Japanese invasion.

== Communist areas during ROC era ==
The practice of "people's mediation" in the 1920s in the Chinese Communist Party (CCP)'s rural base areas which lacked developed judicial infrastructure. The practice of people's mediation continued after Mao Zedong's 1949 proclamation of the People's Republic of China.

In the Yan'an Soviet, the CCP also developed a new form of legal practice known as "Ma Xiwu's Way". This practice emphasized the usage of both mediation and adjudication in local civil cases, through a process of soliciting community opinion, making court accessible and open to the whole community, and making decisions based on mass opinion and approval, under the guidance of a revolutionary judge.

Generally, the legal system in Yan'an favored rehabilitation more than punishment for crimes deemed non-political. For crimes deemed "most heinous", such as traitors, the CCP held public trials with a jury composed of local government officials. These public trials typically had audiences of thousands of locals. The penalty in these most serious cases was usually execution. The CCP would publicize these trials throughout the Yan'an Soviet.

== Development after 1949 ==
According to Chinese Communist Party (CCP) ideology, the party controlled the state and created and used the law to regulate the masses, realize socialism, and suppress counterrevolutionaries. Since it was the CCP's view that the law and legal institutions existed to support party and state power, law often took the form of general principles and shifting policies rather than detailed and constant rules. The Communists wrote laws in simple enough language that every individual could understand and abide by them. Technical language and strict legal procedures for the police and the courts were dispensed with so as to encourage greater popular appreciation of the legal system.

Moreover, Mao Zedong maintained that revolution was continuous, and he opposed any legal system that would constrain it. Whereas Western law stressed stability, Mao sought constant change, emphasized the contradictions in society, and called for relentless class struggle. In this milieu, the courts were instruments for achieving political ends, and criminal law was used by the party to conduct class struggle. The emphasis was shifting constantly, and new "enemies" were often identified. Mao believed it unwise to codify a criminal law that later might restrain the party.

The Maoists wanted the administration of justice to be as decentralized as possible in order to be consistent with the "mass line." Neighborhood committees and work units, supervised by local officials, used peer pressure to handle most legal problems in consonance with current central policies. The police and courts were left to handle only the most serious cases. In both traditional and contemporary China, political and legal theory tended to support such methods. Mao was unconcerned that a person contesting the result of a group decision had nowhere to go for redress.

After 1949, the CCP also greatly altered the character of the legal profession. A number of law schools were closed, and most of the teachers were retired. Legal work was carried on by a handful of Western-trained specialists and a large number of legal cadres hastily trained in China. From the beginning these two groups disagreed over legal policy, and the development of the legal system reflected their continuous debate over both form and substance.

The Western-trained specialists were Kuomintang-era lawyers who chose to cooperate with the Communists. Because they were considered politically unreliable, the CCP initially ignored most of their arguments for a modern legal system. As the 1950s progressed, however, this group was instrumental in China's adoption of a legal system based on the system of the Soviet Union. In general, the specialists wanted codified law, enforced by a strict Soviet-style legal bureaucracy. Without such procedures, they felt, there would be too much arbitrariness, and eventually the legal system would become ineffective. Many of these specialists passed from the scene when the Soviet model was abandoned in the late 1950s, but some became CCP members and gained influential positions.

In the first thirty years of the People's Republic, the new legal cadres—chosen more for their ideological convictions than legal expertise—conducted the day-to-day legal work. These cadres favored the Maoist system of social and political control and regarded themselves as supervisors of the masses who subscribed to a common set of communist values. The new cadres saw this common ideology as providing better overall direction than strict legal controls could. They believed that China was too large to be governed by any single set of fixed rules or a legal bureaucracy. They preferred to administer justice by simplified directives tailored to the needs of local communities so that the people (and the new cadres) could participate fully in their implementation. As part of this plan, the cadres organized "study groups" to familiarize every citizen with current directives and circulars.

Most cultures agree that the purpose of criminal law is to control deviancy—the Chinese traditionally have sought to do so through peer groups rather than through the courts. This practice continued after 1949. Ideally, peers helped the deviant through criticism or shuofu (persuading by talking). The stress was on education and rehabilitation, a policy linked to the Confucian and Maoist tenet that, with patience and persuasion, a person can be reformed.

== Early years of the People's Republic (1949–1953) ==
In 1949, the CCP abolished all Kuomintang laws and judicial organs and established the Common Program, a statement of national purposes adopted by a September 1949 session of the Chinese People's Political Consultative Conference, as a provisional constitution. Under the Common Program, 148 mainly experimental or provisional laws and regulations were adopted to establish the new socialist rule. The most important and farreaching of these laws dealt with marriage, land reform, counterrevolutionaries, and corruption. A three-level, single appeal court system was established, and the Supreme People's Procuratorate and local people's procuratorates were instituted. The procuratorates were established to ensure that government organs at all levels, persons in government service, and all citizens strictly observed the Common Program and the policies, directives, laws, and decrees of the people's government. They also were to investigate and prosecute counterrevolutionary and other criminal cases; to contest illegal or improper judgments rendered by judicial organs at every level; and to investigate illegal measures taken by places of detention and labor-reform organs anywhere in the country. They were to dispose of cases submitted by citizens who were dissatisfied with the decision of "no prosecution" made by the procuratorial organs of lower levels and to intervene in important civil cases and administrative legal actions affecting the national interest.

The period 1949-52 was one of national integration in the wake of decades of disunity, turmoil, and war, and included efforts to bring the diverse elements of a disrupted society into line with the new political direction of the state. The land reform movement of 1949-51 was accompanied, in 1950, by the movement to suppress counterrevolutionaries. In 1952 the san fan ("three anti") movement opposed corruptions, waste, and bureaucratism, while the wu fan ("five anti") movement rallied against bribery, tax evasion, theft of state assets, cheating on government contracts, and theft of state economic secrets (see Three-anti/five-anti campaigns). During this period, few cases were brought to court. Instead, administrative agencies, especially the police, conducted mass trials with large crowds of onlookers shouting accusations. Hundreds of thousands were executed as a result of those "trials," and many more were sent to prison or to labor camps. In the relatively few cases that were tried in formal courts, court records gave little indication as to what laws were used as a basis for the judgment.

In 1952 the authorities launched a nationwide judicial reform movement "to rectify and purify the people's judicial organs at every level politically, organizationally, and ideologically, and to strengthen the party's leadership of judicial work." Kuomintang-era judges were purged from the courts, and those who remained, having been tacitly cleared of charges of "flagrant counterrevolution" and sworn to uphold the mass line in judicial work, continued to press for a more regularized Soviet-style legal system. These judges were confident that the mass movements shortly would end and that the communist-run government eventually would see that it needed a more formal judicial structure. Indeed, at the instigation of the legal specialists, in 1953 the state began to promulgate separate criminal laws.

== Legal system under the 1954 Constitution ==
The state constitution promulgated in September 1954 attempted to set down in legal form the central tasks of the country in the transition period of the mid-1950s and to regulate China's strides toward socialism. The state constitution provided the framework of a legal system much like that in effect in the Soviet Union from 1921 to 1928. Much of the Soviet legal code was translated into Chinese, and Soviet legal experts helped rewrite it to suit Chinese conditions.

The 1954 state constitution gave the Standing Committee of the National People's Congress the power to appoint and dismiss judicial personnel and to enact legal codes. The state constitution protected individuals from arrest and detention unless approved by the people's procuratorates, and it granted citizens freedom of speech, correspondence, demonstration, and religious belief. Citizens could vote and could run for election. They also acquired the right to an education, work, rest, material assistance in old age, and the ability to lodge complaints with state agencies. Each citizen was granted the right to a public trial and to offer a defense aided by a "people's lawyer." Citizens were granted equality before the law, and women were guaranteed equal legal rights. Under the 1954 state constitution, local procuratorates that had been responsible both to the procuratorate at the next higher level and to the government at the corresponding level were responsible only to the procuratorate at the next higher level. Technically, the judiciary became independent, and the Supreme People's Court became the highest judicial organ of the state.

Additionally, a law codification commission was set up to draft the first criminal code of the People's Republic and to describe criminal liability in detail. A set of rules for the proper conduct for police and judicial personnel was established, and it became the "political task" of the courts to determine what was or was not an offense. A criminal law, a code of criminal procedure, and a civil code were drafted, but none of these were enacted until twenty-five years later.

To cope with the anticipated need for more lawyers, law schools expanded and revamped their curricula. A large quantity of legal books and journals reappeared for use by law students. Although all lawyers were supposed to be conversant in the current ideology, many developed into "legal specialists" with more concern for the law than for ideology. Although this viewpoint would be condemned in 1957 when the Soviet-style legal system was rejected, in 1954 it appeared that China had taken a first step toward an orderly administration of justice.

Between 1954 and 1957, much effort was expended to make the legal system work, but the underlying conflict between the specialists and the cadres, who were more concerned about ideology than the legal system, remained. By 1956 the situation had polarized. The specialists argued that the period of intense class struggle was over and that all people should now be considered equal before the law and the state constitution. The cadres, on the other hand, contended that class struggle would never end and that separate standards should be applied to class enemies. They saw the specialists as obstructing the revolution—trying to subvert the new state and restore the rights of old class enemies.

In 1956 Mao personally launched a mass movement under the classical slogan "Let a hundred flowers bloom, let the hundred schools of thought contend." His essay "On the Correct Handling of Contradictions among the People," published in early 1957, encouraged people to vent their criticisms as long as they were "constructive" ("among the people") rather than "hateful and destructive" ("between the enemy and ourselves"). Mao was anxious to defuse the potential for a backlash against communist rule such as had occurred in Hungary and Poland.

The legal specialists were among the most vociferous critics of CCP and government policies. They complained that there were too few laws and that the National People's Congress was slow in enacting laws already drafted. They felt that legal institutions were maturing too slowly and that the poorly qualified cadres were obstructing the work of these institutions to suit their own political ends. The legal experts also spoke out against those, especially party members, who thought themselves above the law.

By August 1957 the criticisms of CCP and state policies were too broad and penetrating to be ignored. Mao and his supporters labeled the critics "rightists" and launched a campaign against them. Among the first victims of the Anti-Rightist Campaign were the specialists and their legal system. Mao objected to this system for several reasons—among them, his views that the Soviet model was too Westernized for China and that the judicial system was too constraining.

The specialists' proposals for a judiciary free from party and political interference were denounced and ridiculed. Mao did not want a judiciary that stood as an impartial arbiter between the CCP and anyone else. The principle of presumption of innocence was spurned, as was the notion that the law always should act "in the interest of the state and the people" rather than the party.

Many specialists were transferred to nonjudicial jobs and replaced by CCP cadres. All codification commissions stopped work, and no new laws were drafted. The number of law schools dropped sharply as most universities shifted their curriculum to more politically acceptable subjects. Later, during the Cultural Revolution (1966–76), almost all the remaining law schools were closed.

With the Anti-Rightist Campaign of mid-1957 and the Great Leap Forward (1958–60), a new mass line emerged. The Anti-Rightist Campaign halted the trend toward legal professionalism, which was seen as a threat to CCP control. The party leadership resolutely declared its power absolute in legal matters. The Great Leap Forward sought to rekindle revolutionary spirit among the people. The mass line, as it affected public order, advocated turning an increasing amount of control and judicial authority over to the masses. This meant greater involvement and authority for the neighborhood committees and grass-roots mass organizations.

The Anti-Rightist Campaign put an end to efforts that would have brought about some degree of judicial autonomy and safeguards for the accused, and the country moved toward police domination. By 1958 the police were empowered to impose sanctions as they saw fit. The CCP gave low priority to the courts, and, as many judicial functions were turned over to local administrative officials, few qualified people chose to stay with the still-operating courts. The number of public trials decreased, and by the early 1960s the court system had become mostly inactive. One unexpected by-product of the shift from formal legal organs to local administrative control was that criminal sentences became milder. Persons found guilty of grand theft, rape, or manslaughter were sentenced to only three to five years' imprisonment, and the death penalty rarely was imposed.

During the Great Leap Forward, the number of arrests, prosecutions, and convictions increased as the police dispensed justice "on the spot" for even minor offenses. Still, the excesses of the Great Leap Forward were milder than those of the 1949-52 period, when many of those arrested were summarily executed. Persons found guilty during the Great Leap Forward were regarded as educable. After 1960, during a brief period of ascendancy of the political moderates, there was some emphasis on rebuilding the judicial sector, but the Cultural Revolution nullified most of the progress that had been made under the 1954 state constitution.

== Legal system under the 1975 Constitution ==
The state constitution adopted in January 1975 overwhelmingly drew its inspiration from Mao Zedong Thought. It stressed party leadership and reduced the power of the National People's Congress. The streamlined document (30 articles compared with 106 in 1954) reduced even further the constitutional restraints on the Maoists. The sole article in the new state constitution that pertained to judicial authority eliminated the procuratorate and transferred its functions and powers to the police. The marked increase in police power suited the radical leaders in the CCP hierarchy who wanted public security forces to have the power to arrest without having to go through other judicial organs.

The National People's Congress theoretically was still empowered to enact laws, select and reject state officials, and direct the judiciary. The party, however, was the ultimate arbiter, and the Supreme People's Court was no longer designated the highest judicial body in the land but was only mentioned in passing as one of the courts exercising judicial authority.

Equality before the law, a provision of the 1954 state constitution, was eliminated. Moreover, people no longer had the right to engage in scientific research or literary or artistic creation nor the freedom to change residences. Some new rights were added, including the freedom to propagate atheism and to practice religion. Citizens also gained the "four big rights": the right to speak out freely, air views fully, hold great debates, and write big-character posters. These "new" forms of socialist revolution along with the right to strike were examples of radical political activism popularized during the Cultural Revolution that were revoked in 1979.

Under the 1975 state constitution, Socialist legality was characterized by instant, arbitrary arrest. Impromptu trials were conducted either by a police officer on the spot, by a revolutionary committee (the local government body established during the Cultural Revolution decade), or by a mob. Spur-of-the-moment circulars and party regulations continued to take the place of a code of criminal law or judicial procedure. For example, during demonstrations in Beijing's Tiananmen Square in early 1976, three demonstrators were seized by police and accused of being counterrevolutionaries in support of Deng Xiaoping. The three were "tried" by the "masses" during a two-hour "struggle meeting," a session where thousands of onlookers shouted their accusations. After this "trial," during which the accused were forbidden to offer a defense (even if they had wished to), the three were sentenced to an unspecified number of years in a labor camp. In contrast to the milder sentences of the 1957 period, sentencing under the state constitution of 1975 was severe. Death sentences were handed down frequently for "creating mass panic," burglary, rape, and looting.

Following the death of Mao in September 1976 and the arrest of the Gang of Four less than a month later, the government took its first steps to set aside the 1975 state constitution and restore the pre-Cultural Revolution legal system. In January 1977 Premier Hua Guofeng directed legal experts to begin rebuilding judicial institutions in the spirit of the 1954 state constitution. The Chinese press began to carry stories about the virtues of the 1954 document and the Gang of Four's abuse of it. Later in the year, Hua announced that China had eight important tasks to fulfill, among them the reconstruction of formal legal institutions.

During the fall of 1977, the People's Liberation Army (PLA) and militia began turning over the responsibility for public security to the civilian sector. Judicial and public security workers held meetings to seek ways "to strengthen the building of the legal forces... and socialist legal systems." A theoretical study group from the Supreme People's Court affirmed that the courts and the public security organs were solely responsible for maintaining public order, and they called on the people to accept the views of superior authorities.

The government set out to reorganize completely all judicial procedures and establish codes of criminal law and judicial procedure as quickly as possible. Law schools were reopened, professors were rehired to staff them, and legal books and journals reappeared. By the end of 1977, the legal system and the courts reportedly were stronger than at any time since the 1954-56 period.

== 1978-1981 ==
A new constitution intended to provide a structural basis for the return to socialist legality was adopted at the Fifth National People's Congress in March 1978. Legal reform was deemed essential not only to prevent a return to power of the radicals but also to provide the legal structure for the economic development of the country envisioned by the CCP leadership.

The 1978 state constitution reaffirmed the principle—deleted in the 1975 state constitution—of the equality of all citizens before the law. It guaranteed the right to a public trial, except in cases involving national security, sex offenses, or minors, and reaffirmed a citizen's right to offer a defense—also omitted in 1975.

The National People's Congress called for new criminal, procedural, civil, and economic codes as quickly as possible, using the new state constitution as a guide. The delegates quoted Mao as having said in 1962 that "we not only need a criminal code but also a civil code," and they invoked Mao's authority against those who viewed regularizing the legal system as counter-revolutionary.

In November 1978 the Law Institute of the Chinese Academy of Social Sciences, working in conjunction with the Legal Affairs Commission of the National People's Congress proposed strengthening the socialist legal system, which, it explained, was based on democracy, socialist principles, and the worker-peasant alliance. The institute added that the system should be formulated, enforced, and used by the people for economic development and against groups such as the Gang of Four. The 1978 state constitution gave the National People's Congress sole authority to interpret, promulgate, and change laws. It also reestablished the people's procuratorates and made them responsible both to the procuratorate at the next higher level and to the people's government at the same level, as they had been before 1954.

Sweeping reforms in China's legal system were announced at the Second Session of the Fifth National People's Congress held in June and July 1979. The changes, effective as of January 1, 1980, reflected the leadership's conviction that if economic modernization was to succeed, the people—who had suffered through the humiliations, capricious arrests, and massive civil disorders of the Cultural Revolution (1966–76)—had to be assured that they no longer would be abused or incarcerated on the basis of hearsay or arbitrary political pronouncements.

In mid-1979 China promulgated a series of new statutes that included the country's first criminal law, the first criminal procedure law, and updated laws on courts and procuratorates. Extensive preparations preceded the announcements. Beginning in early 1979, for example, the media hosted debates on subjects such as judicial independence, presumption of innocence, and equality of all citizens before the law. A national conference of procuratorates in January 1979 stressed the need for thorough investigations in all cases and respect for evidence. The participants in the conference warned that extorted confessions would no longer be accepted and that the police could not make arrests without procuratorate approval. If circumstances did not permit prior approval, the approval had to be obtained after the fact or the detainee had to be released.

Judicial work conferences were held throughout China to make recommendations to the National People's Congress concerning an independent judiciary. According to the recommendations, Chinese courts in the future would base their judgments on the law, while continuing to "work under unified leadership of the local party committees." In short, party policy no longer would be the equivalent of the law, but judicial independence in China could still be modified by party guidance.

Peng Zhen, director of the Legal Affairs Commission and active in the reform efforts of the early 1960s, announced the new laws in June 1979 and had them published shortly thereafter. According to Peng's announcement, the laws were based on 1954 and 1963 drafts and provided a foundation for the socialist legal system and, ultimately, social democracy. He affirmed that the judiciary would be independent and subject only to the law; that all individuals, no matter how senior, would be equal before the law; and that party members and cadres would have to forego special treatment and set an example for the people. In November 1979 Peng was appointed secretary general of the Standing Committee of the Fifth National People's Congress, a position from which he could control the reconstruction of the legal system.

Among the laws approved by the Second Session of the Fifth National People's Congress to take effect January 1, 1980, was the Organic Law of the Local People's Congresses and the Local People's Governments. The revolutionary committees, which had assumed judicial authority in the 1967-76 period, were eliminated; their authority was assumed by local people's governments, and judicial responsibility was returned to the appropriate courts.

The Electoral Law for the National People's Congress and Local People's Congresses, also to take effect January 1, 1980, provided for the direct election of some procurators and judges. The Organic Law of the People's Courts was designed to create a more orderly environment and to assure the people that the chaotic years of the Cultural Revolution, with no courts and no legal guarantees, were over. The law, a revised version of 1954 drafts, guaranteed the accused equality before the law regardless of race, nationality, sex, social background, or religious beliefs and gave people the right to a lawyer. In certain cases, the lawyer would be court-appointed. The law called for independence of the judiciary from political interference. Courts were free to establish judicial committees to assist them in difficult cases, and there were provisions for citizens to be elected as assessors to participate with judges in adjudicating cases. The local language was to be the medium for conducting court proceedings and writing court decisions. Cases involving the death penalty were to be reviewed by the Supreme People's Court, and all defendants were entitled to appeal to the next higher court.

The Organic Law of the People's Procuratorates, an amended version of a 1954 law, made procurators responsible for supervising law enforcement by the police, courts, and administrative agencies. The procuratorate was linked to China's past in that it functioned like the censorial system of imperial China. It served as the eyes and ears of the government, just as the censorial system was the watchdog for the emperor.

The procurators were elected by local people's congresses and approved by the next higher procuratorial level to handle only criminal cases. The independence of the procuratorates was constitutionally guaranteed. Still, their responsibilities were difficult, especially in any case involving a high party official. According to the new law, procuratorates at all levels had to establish procuratorial committees, practice democratic centralism, and make decisions through discussion. Ideally, a procuratorate at a lower level would be led, rather than dictated to, by one at the next higher level. Each procuratorate was responsible to the standing committee of the people's congress at the corresponding level.

People's congresses have been re-established at all levels, charged with the work of enacting law. The use of mediation committees – informed groups of citizens who resolve about 90 percent of China's civil disputes and some minor criminal cases at no cost to the parties – is one innovative device. There are more than 800,000 such committees in both rural and urban areas. The primary motivation has been to limit arbitrary behavior by powerful officials and to provide standards for managing social, economic and political relationships, including foreign investment. Law has been perceived as a key element of regime legitimacy as it serves to institutionalize economic reform.

The 1980 Criminal Law was intended to protect state property as well as the personal and property rights of citizens against unlawful infringement by any person or institution. It safeguarded the fundamental rights stipulated in the 1978 state constitution and prescribed penalties for counterrevolutionary activities (crimes against the state) and other criminal offenses. Prevention of crime and rehabilitation through education (taking into account actual conditions in China in 1979) were stressed. Illegal incarcerations, fabrications, prosecutions, and intimidation were forbidden, but the provisions of the law did not apply retroactively.

The Criminal Law contained a provision prohibiting the criminal prosecution of a person who had "reactionary," that is, antiparty, ideas but who had committed no "reactionary" actions. As Peng Zhen pointed out in late 1979, because "most contradictions were among the people," involving constructive criticism not antagonistic to the party or state, punishment was inappropriate (see Chinese intellectualism). As in some other areas of the law, the actual judicial disposition appeared at times to be at variance with this particular principle.

The law defined criminal acts and distinguished between actual crimes and accidents. It also established a statute of limitations both to demonstrate the "humanitarian spirit" of the penal code and to permit law enforcement officials to concentrate on crimes for which evidence was still available. The law retained the important legal principle of analogy, according to which acts not specifically defined might be considered crimes. Criminal charges could not be brought unless there was evidence that a crime had been committed; the sole basis for prosecution was verifiable evidence. The law also defined basic understandable rules of evidence. The death penalty could be imposed for flagrant counterrevolutionary acts and for homicide, arson, criminal intent in causing explosions, and other offenses of this nature. The 1983 revision of the law considerably increased the number of offenses punishable by the death penalty.

The Law on Criminal Procedure was promulgated to reform judicial procedures in enforcing the Criminal Law. It was designed to educate citizens, establish judicial jurisdictions, and streamline judicial appeal and review. The law described the relationship between public security organs (investigations and provisional apprehensions), the procuratorates (arrest approvals, possible procuratorial investigations, prosecutions and supervision of the police and penal institutions), and the courts (trials and sentencing). It also guaranteed the accused the right to make a defense at a public trial with an advocate present.

The public security organs, procuratorates, and courts had to base their judgments on verified evidence using the law as a measure. There were strict time limits on court and police actions to prevent overly lengthy detention.

From the perspective of the leaders of the CCP, moreover, codified laws and a strengthened legal system were seen as important means of preventing a possible return of radical policies and a repetition of the era when the Gang of Four ruled by fiat and inconsistent party regulations. Aside from establishing a legal code that would be more difficult for corrupt officials to manipulate, the new laws made the courts responsible for applying all but minor sanctions and made the police answerable to the courts. Procuratorates, which had fallen into disuse during the Cultural Revolution, were reinstituted to prosecute criminal cases, review court decisions, and investigate the legality of actions taken by the police and other government organizations. A greater role for the courts and independent investigations were expected to make it more difficult to introduce politically colored testimony into the courtrooms.

The adoption of a modern legal system has been driven by the central government in Beijing. While economic reforms were welcomed by most of the population, the new legal institutions, are still unsupported. Even in the marketplace, where customary normative frameworks are weak from decades of socialist suppression, the weakness of mechanisms of enforcement still preclude observance of law.

== Legal reforms under the 1982 Constitution ==
In late 1982 the National People's Congress adopted a new state constitution. The 1982 state Constitution incorporates many provisions of the laws passed since 1978 and distinguishes between the functions of the state and of the CCP, mandating that "no organization or individual may enjoy the privilege of being above the Constitution and the law" (Article 5). This article had been interpreted by Chinese observers to include CCP leaders. The state Constitution also delineated the fundamental rights and duties of citizens, including protection from defamation of character, illegal arrest or detention, and unlawful search.

The National People's Congress and the local people's congresses continued to enact legislation to meet the juridical and other needs of their jurisdictions. The draft Law on Civil Procedure, in force from October 1982, provided guidelines for hearing civil cases. These cases constituted the majority of lawsuits in China, and in the 1980s the number was growing rapidly. In some of the lower courts almost all cases were civil.

A major problem in implementing new criminal and civil laws was a critical lack of trained legal personnel. In August 1980 the Standing Committee of the National People's Congress had sought to remedy this shortage by passing the Provisional Act on Lawyers of the People's Republic of China, which took effect on January 1, 1982. Before the law went into effect, there were only 1,300 legal advisory offices and 4,800 lawyers in China. By mid-1983 the number had increased to 2,300 legal advisory offices staffed by more than 12,000 lawyers (approximately 8,600 full-time and 3,500 part-time). To meet the growing demand for lawyers, law institutes and university law departments that had been closed during the Cultural Revolution were reopened, and additional ones were established. By mid-1985 approximately 3,000 lawyers per year were graduating from the 5 legal institutes and 31 university law departments located throughout the country.

The law also established legal advisory offices at every level of government and established the duties, rights, and qualifications of lawyers. Any Chinese citizen with the right to vote who has passed a professional competency test after formal training or after two to three years of experience in legal work could qualify as a lawyer. Lawyers were expected to act as legal advisers to government and nongovernment organizations and as both public and private litigants in civil suits, to defend the accused in criminal cases on request of the defendant or upon assignment of the court, and to offer legal advice at a nominal charge to anyone requesting it. The 1982 law guaranteed that in carrying out these duties lawyers would be permitted to meet and to correspond with their clients without interference from any organization or individual. The law seemed to have had a positive effect. Although there was a serious shortage of lawyers and great disparity in professional competence among those practicing, China in the mid-1980s was making progress in developing a corps of lawyers to meet its legal needs.

Legal reform slowed down after the 1989 Tiananmen Square protests and massacre but became a government priority again after Deng Xiaoping's tour of southern China in 1992. Important laws have been enacted in relation to commercial transactions, administrative litigation, and the judiciary system. When it did, the legal reform did what it could.

To a large extent legal reform has been driven by economic liberalization. Whilst there has been resistance to politically sensitive legal concepts in non-commercial or public laws, changes have filtered from commerce-related laws. For example, the Administrative Penalty Law (1996) and Administrative Procedure Law (1990) were enacted to stop government interference in state enterprises. The same laws allow citizens to sue officials for abuse of authority or malfeasance.

In addition, the reformed 1997 criminal law and the criminal procedures laws were amended to introduce significant reforms. The criminal law amendments abolished the crime of "counter-revolutionary" activity but only on paper. In fact the term changed into "crimes of endangering national security" but international scholars agree, that the new headline covers largely the same provisions as in the 1979 criminal law.

Criminal procedures reforms also encouraged establishment of a more transparent, adversarial trial process. Minor crimes such as prostitution and drug use are sometimes dealt with under re-education through labor laws.

In some cases, China was willing to adopt whole sectors of a foreign legal system. Examples are the banking and securities system (heavily influenced by the United States) and industrial property laws (a copy of the German system).

They have contributed to establishing the legal order of the domestic market, attracting foreign investment and converging the domestic market with the international market.

== Commercial law ==
To advance its policy of market-based reforms, China adopted foreign approaches to legal regulation, particularly in the area of commercial law. China has now established a comprehensive scheme of legislation, including national laws, administrative regulations, and local rules.

The Sino-Foreign Equity Joint Venture Law, the first law governing foreign investment, was passed in 1980. Since then, more than 300 laws and regulations, most of them in the economic area, have been promulgated.

== Modernization of China’s legal practices ==
After China's Reform and Opening Up, the CCP emphasized the rule of law as a basic strategy and method for state management.

Since the establishment of China's current legal system in 1978–81, the Chinese bar exam has been instrumental in increasing the quality of China's lawyers. The current passing rate for China's bar exam is only 10 percent. Additionally, as a developing nation, China has been worried about the negative impact of opening up its legal services sector to foreign competition. However, the entry of foreign lawyers to China has increased legal expertise of Chinese lawyers on international practices.

Foreign lawyers have accompanied foreign capital and their clients to China. In the early 1980s, the Ministry of Economy and Trade, the predecessor of today's Ministry of Foreign Trade and Economic Cooperation (MOFTEC), promulgated a regulation permitting the establishment of consulting firms to serve foreign trade. As a result, many foreign law firms incorporated consulting firms in their home countries or Hong Kong and then set up subsidiaries in Beijing or Shanghai to provide legal services.

On July 1, 1992, in order to meet growing demand, the Chinese government opened the legal services market to foreign law firms allowing them to establish offices in China when the Ministry of Justice and the State Administration of Industry and Commerce (SAOIC) issued the Provisional Regulation of Establishment of Offices by Foreign Law Firms regulation.

Jiang Zemin called for establishing a socialist rule of law at the 15th National Congress of the Chinese Communist Party in 1997.

Judicial policies during the general secretaryship of Xi Jinping have highlighted increased professionalization of the judiciary and autonomy in routine cases, while maintaining the subordination of the judiciary to the CCP. Xi has emphasized eliminating "judicial corruption and court decisions influenced by money, power, and personal connection." In 2014, Xi announced Comprehensive Law-Based Governance as a major banner of state legal policy.

In 2014, the CCP formally adopted a policy of constructing a "socialist rule of law with Chinese characteristics." Xi Jinping opposes Western views of the rule of law, such as the requirement of judicial independence. Xi describes the leadership of the CCP as essential to upholding the socialist rule of law. Xi states that the two fundamental aspects of the socialist rule of law are: (1) that the political and legal organs (including courts, the police, and the procuratorate) must believe in the law and uphold the law, and (2) all political and legal officials must follow the CCP.Xi's view of the rule of law tends to equate the rule of law with the development of legislation. In his writings on socialist rule of law, Xi has emphasized traditional Chinese concepts including people as the root of the state (mingben), "the ideal of no lawsuit" (tianxia wusong), "respecting rite and stressing law" (longli zhongfa), "virtue first, penalty second" (dezhu xingfu), and "promoting virtue and being prudent in punishment" (mingde shenfa).

In 2015, the Supreme People's Court issued its Opinions on Comprehensively Deepening the Reform of the People's Courts, which detailed measures to restructure the judiciary. These included the Judicial Centralization Reform and the Judicial Accountability Reform, which sought to increase judicial independence from local governments and to reduce influence on lower level judges from higher judicial authorities.

Since 2017, an initiative of the Supreme People's Court and the Ministry of Justice has made free legal counsel available in non-summary trial to almost all criminal defendants.

== See also ==
- Court system of the People's Republic of China
- Law enforcement in the People's Republic of China
- Ministry of Justice of the People's Republic of China
- Penal system in China
