= Zhang Yuhuan case =

Chinese criminal murder case

An interview with Zhang Yuhuan, he said the environment has changed dramatically and he is like a little boy

The Zhang Yuhuan case (Chinese: 张玉环案) is a Chinese criminal murder case. Zhang Yuhuan (born September 18, 1967) was accused of killing two children in a village in Jiangxi.

== Trial ==
In the trial, Nanchang Intermediate People's Court sentenced Zhang to death with reprieve. After multiple processes, on August 4, 2020, the Jiangxi High People's Court made a judgement saying this case lacks sufficient evidence to prove Zhang guilty and he was freed. He had stayed in prison for 9778 days, nearly 27 years. This case led to many controversies about human rights and wrongful convictions in China.

Zhang and his lawyer, Luo Jinshou sued for about 22.34 million yuan (3.3 million dollars). He received about 4.96 million yuan (738 thousand dollars) from the Jiangxi high people's court for the wrong judgement.
