= Intermediate people's court =

Level of court in the People's Republic of China

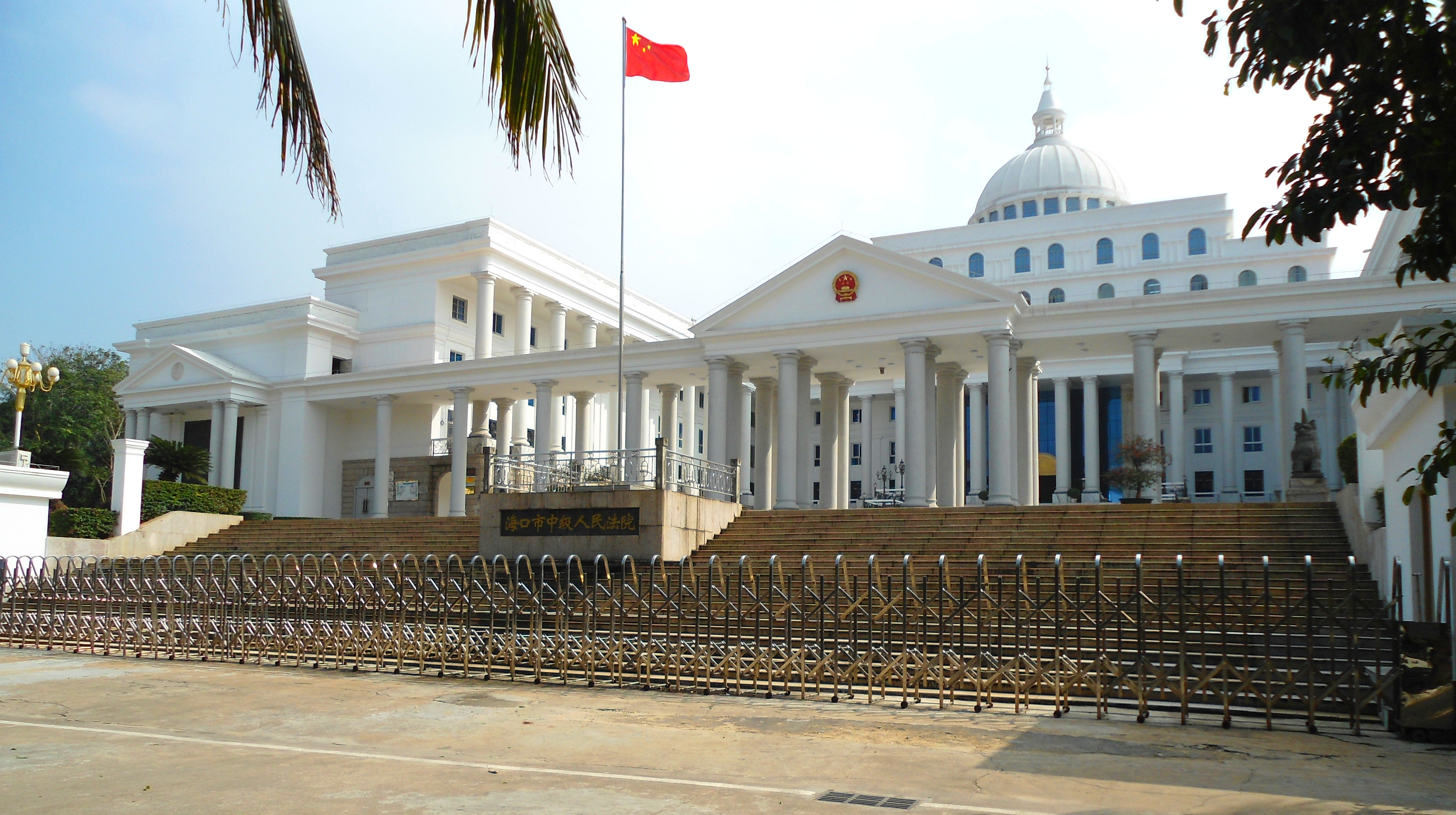
A picture of Haikou Intermediate People's Court in Haikou, Hainan Province, People's Republic of China

An intermediate people's court (Chinese: 中级人民法院) is the second-lowest local people's court in China. According to the Organic Law of the People's Courts of the People's Republic of China, the intermediate people's courts handle relevant important local cases in the first instance and hear appeal cases from the basic people's courts.

== Jurisdiction ==
=== Criminal cases ===
According to article 21 of Criminal Procedure Law of the People's Republic of China, intermediate people's courts have original jurisdiction over the following kinds of criminal cases:

1. Cases concerning activities endangering national security and terrorism;
2. Cases whose potential penalties include life imprisonment or death penalty.

=== Civil cases ===
According to article 19 of Civil Procedure Law of the People's Republic of China, intermediate people's courts have original jurisdiction over the following kinds of civil cases:

1. High-impact cases involving foreign nationals;
2. Cases with significant impact in the area of jurisdiction of the court;
3. Cases assigned to the court by the Supreme People's Court.

=== Administrative cases ===
According to article 15 of Administrative Procedure Law of the People's Republic of China, intermediate people's courts have original jurisdiction over the following kinds of administrative cases:

1. Cases brought against official actions of the State Council or local governments on the town level or above;
2. Cases against official actions of the customs authority;
3. Important or complex cases in the jurisdiction of the court;
4. Other cases assigned to intermediate people's courts by law.

== List of Intermediate Courts ==
Intermediate people's court are found at the level of prefectures, autonomous prefectures, and municipalities across China, excluding Macau and Hong Kong:

- Aba Tibetan and Qiang Autonomous Prefecture Intermediate People's Court (Sichuan)
- Ankang Intermediate People's Court
- Anshan Intermediate People's Court
- Anshun City Intermediate People's Court (Guizhou)
- Anyang City Intermediate People's Court
- Baoding City Intermediate People's Court (Hebei)
- Baoji City Intermediate People's Court
- Baotou City Intermediate People's Court (Inner Mongolia)
- Bazhong City Intermediate People's Court (Sichuan)
- Beihai City Intermediate People's Court
- Beijing No 1 Intermediate People's Court (Beijing)
- Beijing No 2 Intermediate People's Court (Beijing)
- Bengbu Intermediate People's Court
- Benxi Intermediate People's Court
- Bijie Intermediate People's Court (Guizhou)
- Bose Intermediate People's Court
- Cangzhou Intermediate People's Court (Hebei)
- Changchun Intermediate People's Court
- Changde Intermediate People's Court
- Changsha Intermediate People's Court
- Chaoyang City Intermediate People's Court
- Chengde City Intermediate People's Court (Hebei)
- Chengdu Intermediate People's Court (Sichuan)
- Chengdu Jinjiang Intermediate People's Court (Sichuan)
- Chenzhou Intermediate People's Court
- Chifeng Intermediate People's Court (Inner Mongolia)
- Chongqing No.1 Intermediate People's court
- Chongzuo Intermediate People's Court
- Daqing City Intermediate People's Court (Heilongjiang)
- Daxinganling area Intermediate People's Court (Heilongjiang)
- Deyang City Intermediate People's Court (Sichuan)
- Dongying Intermediate People's Court
- Erdos Intermediate People's Court (Inner Mongolia)
- Fangchenggang City Intermediate People's Court
- Fushun Intermediate People's Court
- Fuxin City Intermediate People's Court
- Fuzhou Intermediate People's Court
- Fuzhou Intermediate People's Court
- Ganzhou City Intermediate People's Court
- Ganzi Tibetan Autonomous Prefecture Intermediate People's Court (Sichuan)
- Guangyuan Intermediate People's Court (Sichuan)
- Guigang City Intermediate People's Court
- Guilin Intermediate People's Court
- Guiyang Intermediate People's Court (Guizhou)
- Han River Intermediate People's Court
- Handan Intermediate People's Court (Hebei)
- Hanzhong Intermediate People's Court
- Harbin Intermediate People's Court (Heilongjiang)
- Hebi Intermediate People's Court
- Hechi City Intermediate People's Court
- Hegang City Intermediate People's Court (Heilongjiang)
- Heihe City Intermediate People's Court (Heilongjiang)
- Hengshui Intermediate People's Court (Hebei)
- Hengyang Intermediate People's Court
- Hezhou Intermediate People's Court
- Huaihua Intermediate People's Court
- Ji'an City Intermediate People's Court
- Jiamusi City Intermediate People's Court (Heilongjiang)
- Jiangxi Yichun City Intermediate People's Court
- Jiaozuo Intermediate People's Court
- Jilin City Intermediate People's Court
- Jinan Intermediate People's Court
- Jingdezhen City Intermediate People's Court
- Jingmen Intermediate People's Court
- Jiujiang Intermediate People's Court
- Jixi City Intermediate People's Court (Heilongjiang)
- Jiyuan Intermediate People's Court
- Kaifeng City Intermediate People's Court
- Kunming Intermediate People's Court
- Laibin Intermediate People's Court
- Langfang Intermediate People's Court
- Leshan City Intermediate People's Court (Sichuan)
- Liaoyang City Intermediate People's Court
- Lijiang City Intermediate People's Court
- Liupanshui City Intermediate People's Court (Guizhou)
- Liuzhou Intermediate People's Court
- Longyan City Intermediate People's Court
- Loudi Intermediate People's Court
- Luohe City Intermediate People's Court
- Luoyang Intermediate People's Court
- Luzhou City Intermediate People's Court (Sichuan)
- Matsubara City Intermediate People's Court
- Meishan City Intermediate People's Court (Sichuan)
- Mianyang City Intermediate People's Court (Sichuan)
- Miao and Dong Autonomous Prefecture Intermediate People's Court (Guizhou)
- Mudanjiang City Intermediate People's Court (Heilongjiang)
- Nanchang Intermediate People's Court
- Nanchong City Intermediate People's Court (Sichuan)
- Nanning Intermediate People's Court
- Nanyang Intermediate People's Court
- Neijiang City Intermediate People's Court (Sichuan)
- Ningbo Intermediate People's Court
- Ningde Intermediate People's Court
- Panjin Intermediate People's Court
- Panzhihua City Intermediate People's Court (Sichuan)
- Pingdingshan Intermediate People's Court
- Pingxiang Intermediate People's Court
- Putian City Intermediate People's Court
- Puyang City Intermediate People's Court
- Qiannan Intermediate People's Court (Guizhou)
- Qianxinan Intermediate People's Court (Guizhou)
- Qinhuangdao Intermediate People's Court (Hebei)
- Qinzhou Intermediate People's Court
- Qiqihar City Intermediate People's Court (Heilongjiang)
- Qitaihe City Intermediate People's Court (Heilongjiang)
- Quingdao Intermediate People's Court
- Qujing Intermediate People's Court
- Sanmenxia Intermediate People's Court
- Shanghai No.1 Intermediate People's Court
- Shangluo Intermediate People's Court
- Shangqiu City Intermediate People's Court
- Shangrao Intermediate People's Court
- Shaoyang City Intermediate People's Court
- Shenyang Intermediate People's Court
- Shenzhen Intermediate People's Court of Guangdoug Province
- Shijiazhuang Intermediate People's Court (Hebei)
- Shiyan Intermediate People's Court
- Shuangyashan City Intermediate People's Court (Heilongjiang)
- Suihua City Intermediate People's Court (Heilongjiang)
- Suining Intermediate People's Court (Sichuan)
- Suqian Intermediate People's Court
- Taiyuan Intermediate People's Court
- Tangshan Municipal Intermediate People's Court (Hebei)
- Tianjin No 1 Intermediate People's Court (Tianjin)
- Tianjin No 2 Intermediate People's Court (Tianjin)
- Tongchuan Intermediate People's Court
- Tongren Prefecture Intermediate People's Court (Guizhou)
- Tujia and Miao Autonomous Prefecture Intermediate People's Court
- Weihai Intermediate People's Court
- Weinan City Intermediate People's Court
- Wuhan City Intermediate People's Court
- Wulanchabu City Intermediate People's Court (Inner Mongolia)
- Wuxi Intermediate People's Court
- Wuzhou Intermediate People's Court
- Xi'an Intermediate People's Court
- Xiangfan Intermediate People's Court
- Xiangtan Intermediate People's Court
- Xianyang Intermediate People's Court
- Xiaogan Intermediate People's Court
- Xingtai Intermediate People's Court (Hebei)
- Xingxiang Intermediate People's Court
- Xinju Intermediate People's Court
- Xinyang Intermediate People's Court
- Xuchang Intermediate People's Court
- Xuzhou City Intermediate People's Court
- Ya'an Intermediate People's Court (Sichuan)
- Yaan City Intermediate People's Court (Sichuan)
- Yibin Municipal Intermediate People's Court (Sichuan)
- Yichang Intermediate People's Court
- Yichun City Intermediate People's Court (Heilongjiang)
- Yinchuan Intermediate People's Court
- Yingkou Intermediate People's Court
- Yingtan Intermediate People's Court
- Yiyang Intermediate People's Court
- Yongzhoui Intermediate People's Court
- Yueyang Intermediate People's Court
- Yulin City Intermediate People's Court
- Yulin Intermediate People's Court
- Zhangjiajie Intermediate People's Court
- Zhangjiakou City Intermediate People's Court (Hebei)
- Zhangye City Intermediate People's Court
- Zhengzhou Intermediate People's Court
- Zhoukou Intermediate People's Court
- Zhumadian City Intermediate People's Court
- Zhuzhou City Intermediate People's Court
- Zigong City Intermediate People's Court (Sichuan)
- Ziyang City Intermediate People's Court (Sichuan)
- Zunyi City Intermediate People's Court (Guizhou)

Outside of regional level there are other intermediate courts for railways and forestry:

- Beijing Railway Transportation Intermediate Court
- Chengdu Railway Transportation Intermediate Court (Sichuan)
- Forest Intermediate People's Court in Heilongjiang Province
- Harbin Railway Transportation Intermediate Court (Heilongjiang)
- Nanning Railway Transportation Intermediate Court
- Zhengzhou Railway Transportation Intermediate Court

== See also ==
- Judicial system of China
  - Local people's court
