= Comprehensive Law-Based Governance =

Chinese Communist Party term

- Simplified Chinese: 全面依法治国
Transcriptions
Standard Mandarin
- Hanyu Pinyin: Quánmiàn yīfǎ zhìguó

Comprehensive Law-Based Governance is a Chinese Communist Party term popularized during the general secretaryship of Xi Jinping to promote judicial regularity and emphasize the political leadership of the CCP.

== History ==
The term Law-Based Governance (Chinese: 依法治国; pinyin: Yīfǎ zhìguó) arose in Chinese political discourses in the early decades of Reform and Opening Up. Pro-reform officials often used the phrase to draw a contrast to the personalist governance style of the Mao Zedong era and the lack of law during the Cultural Revolution. Jiang Zemin made the phrase a formal part of the party-state's governance style in the mid-1990s. Jiang, and then Hu Jintao, used the phrase to describe various reforms of China's legal system to bring it more in line with the general global norms.

In 2014, the fourth plenary session of the 18th Central Committee of the Chinese Communist Party was themed on comprehensively deepening law-based governance. Objectives included insulating courts from improper interferences, preventing cadre from influencing disciplinary activities and mandating discipline for violations. Describing the characteristics of comprehensive law-based governance, Xi stated:

To fully advance Comprehensive Law-Based Governance, the most critical factors are whether the direction is correct and whether the political guarantees are strong. Specifically, it is essential to uphold the leadership of the Party ... The leadership of the Party is ... the most fundamental guarantee of socialist rule of law.

In March 2018, as part of a series of institutional reforms, the phrase was further codified with the establishment of the Central Comprehensive Law-based Governance Commission to coordinate legal policy development. The first Central Conference on Comprehensively Promoting the Rule of Law was held from November 16 to 17, 2020. Xi Jinping Thought on the Rule of Law was also established during the conference as the guiding doctrine for law in the country.

The campaign required agency heads to personally appear in court when their agencies were sued. Academic Yueduan Wang writes that this was "a symbolic but impactful measure aimed at reinforcing the judiciary's authority in administrative litigation."

Adherence to the campaign's principles became a key performance criterion for the CCP's evaluation of government officials. It became increasingly common for officials to be disciplined, or sometimes demoted, if courts rejected agency actions challenged in court and the agency lost an administrative lawsuit as a result.

== See also ==
- Judicial system of China
- Law of the People's Republic of China
- Ideology of the Chinese Communist Party
