= Judicial system of China =

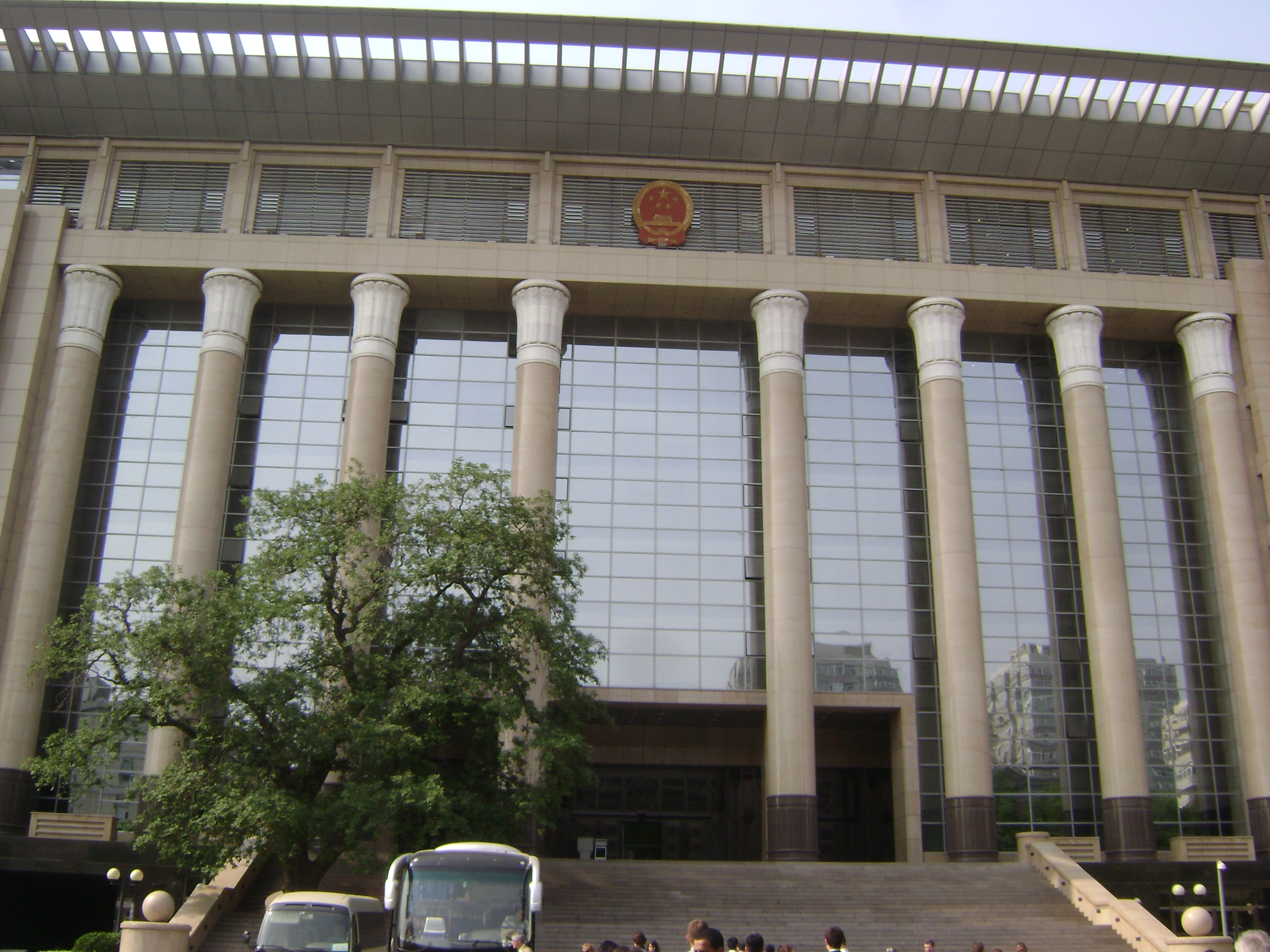
The front facade of the Supreme People's Court of the People’s Republic of China

The judiciary of the People's Republic of China (PRC) is organized under the principle of unified state power of the National People's Congress (NPC) and is represented by its two primary judicial organs, the Supreme People's Court and the Supreme People's Procuratorate. These organs are constitutionally inferior and accountable to the NPC as the supreme state organ of power, and implement its political will.

Judicial independence and judicial review are nonexistent, as courts do not have power beyond what is granted to them by the NPC. The Chinese Communist Party's Central Political and Legal Affairs Commission maintains effective control over the court system and its personnel. Hong Kong and Macau have separate court systems in accordance with the "one country, two systems" doctrine.

== Court structure ==
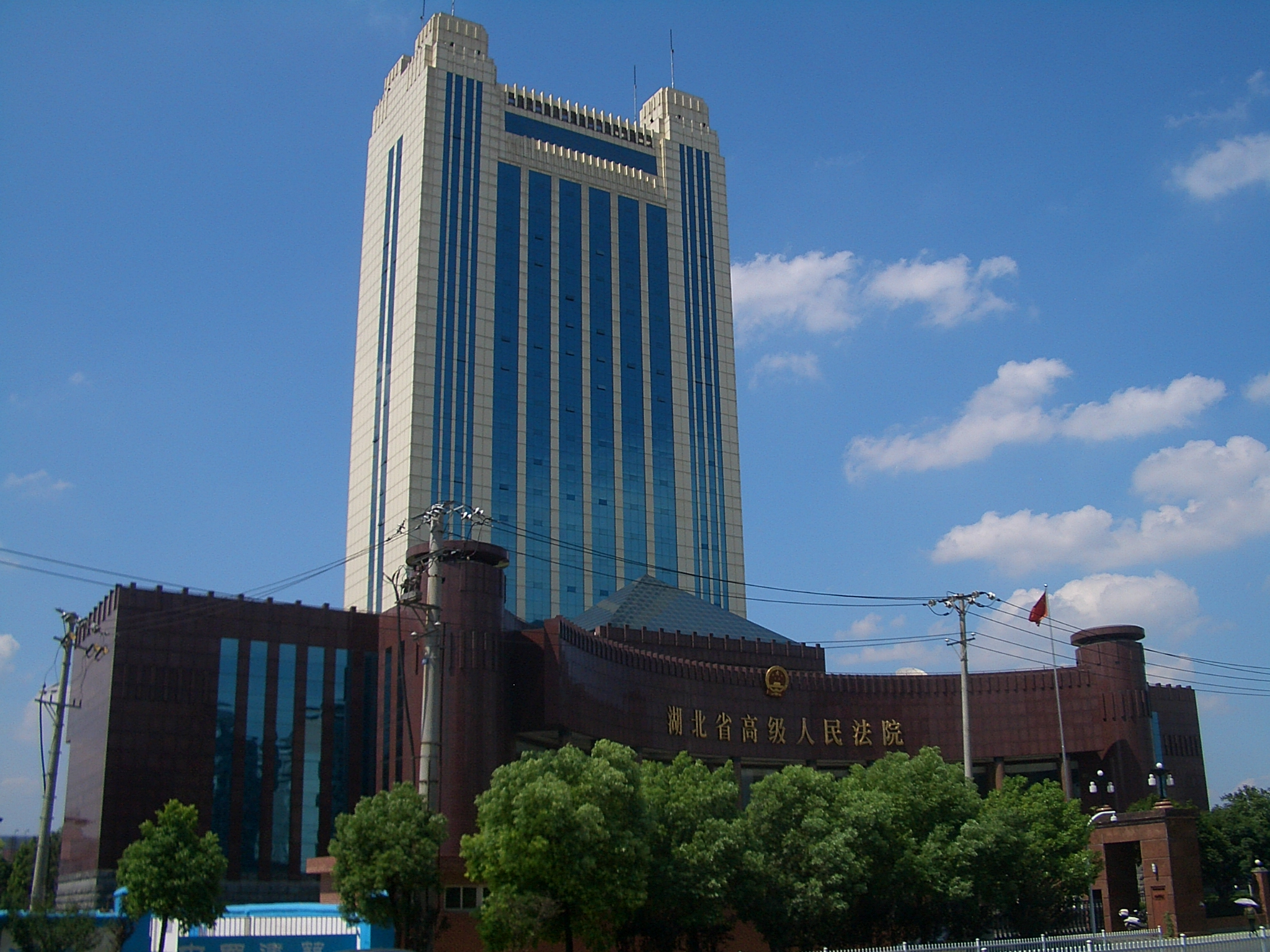
High People's Court of the province of Hubei

According to the 1982 state constitution and the Organic Law of the People's Courts that went into effect on January 1, 1980, the Chinese courts are divided into a four-level court system (Supreme, High, Intermediate and Primary):

- The Supreme People's Court (SPC) is the supreme judicial organ of the state and is located in Beijing, and acts as the premier appellate forum of the land and court of last resort, which supervises the administration of justice by all subordinate "local" and "special" people's courts. It also sets up six circuit courts seat outside of the state capital, which acts in the same capacity, to hear cross-provincial cases within respective jurisdiction.
- Local people's courts—the courts of the first instance—handle criminal and civil cases. These people's courts make up the remaining three levels of the court system and consist of "high people's courts" at the level of the provinces, autonomous regions, and special municipalities; "intermediate people's courts" at the level of prefectures, autonomous prefectures, and municipalities; and "primary people's courts" at the level of autonomous counties, towns, and municipal districts.
- Courts of Special Jurisdiction (special courts) comprises the Military Courts (military), Railway Transportation Court of China (railroad transportation), Maritime Courts (water transportation), Internet Courts, Intellectual Property Courts, and Financial Court. Except for the Military Courts, all other courts of special jurisdiction falls under the general jurisdiction of its respective high court.

The Central Political and Legal Affairs Commission maintains effective control over the appointment of all court personnel.

Candidates for judgeship must pass the National Unified Legal Professional Qualification Examination.

The court system is paralleled by a hierarchy of prosecuting offices called people's procuratorates, the highest being the Supreme People's Procuratorate.

== Legal procedure ==
The Supreme Court is responsible for establishing and monitoring legal procedures in adherence to the laws and orders made by the legislative organs.

Following civil law traditions, the courts do not establish legally-binding precedent. The Supreme Court has the right to publish legal explanations of laws which are legally-binding but the right to interpret the constitution is reserved by the legislative organs. A verdict made by an inferior court can be challenged in its superior court, up to the Supreme Court, there are four levels of courts in total. A superior court can also designate any of its inferior courts to hear an appeal rather than do so itself.

Court proceedings in China are generally livestreamed, with exceptions including where classified information is discussed or where juveniles testify.

=== Civil ===
Besides the court system, it is also encouraged to resolve civil conflicts through a state-sponsored and -regulated mediation and arbitration system. After the first hearing of a civil case, the court is required by law to ask both parties if they are willing to resolve their conflict through mediation. If agreed, the court should assign a mediator and oversee the process. If both parties reach an agreement, it will be legally binding after the agreement is reviewed and documented by a judge of the court.

Courts allow litigants to communicate with it via WeChat, through which the litigant parties can file lawsuits, participate in proceedings, present evidence, and listen to verdicts. As of December 2019, more than 3 million litigants had used WeChat for litigation.

=== Criminal ===
The Criminal Law of the People's Republic of China is the criminal code of the country. Among them, the Criminal Law is a basic law of the People's Republic of China. On the basis of the Criminal Law, there are other separate laws that stipulate new crimes and penalties. As of 2023, the Criminal Law consists of a Criminal Code, twelve amendments, and one or two separate laws.

== History ==
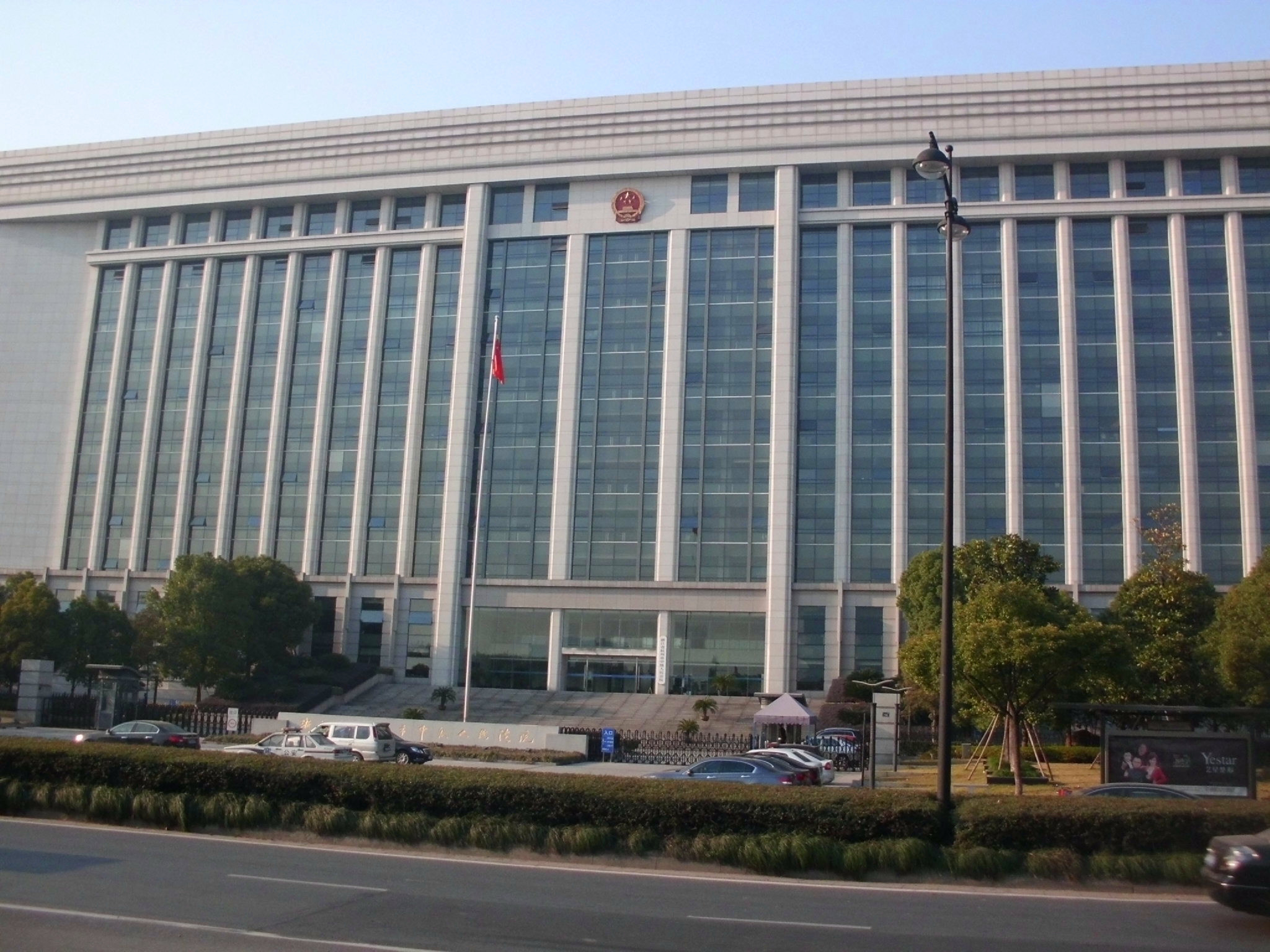
Hangzhou Intermediate People's Court

The Anti-Rightist Campaign of 1957 halted early PRC efforts to professionalize the country's judiciary.

The legal system was largely dismantled during the Cultural Revolution, under the slogan "Smash Police, Procuratorates, and Courts." Judicial institutions were re-developed during the 1970s.

China enacted a new constitution in 1975 and another constitution in 1978.

During the Fifth Session of the National People's Congress, a series of major laws were passed, including the Organic Law of the People's Courts, the Organic Law of the People's Procuratorates, the Criminal Law, and the Criminal Procedure Law.

The 1980 Organic Law of the People's Courts (revised in 1983) and the 1982 State Constitution established four levels of courts in the general administrative structure. Judges are elected or appointed by people's congresses at the corresponding levels to serve a maximum of two five-year terms. Most trials are administered by a collegial bench made up of one to three judges and three to five assessors. Assessors, according to the State Constitution, are elected by local residents or people's congresses from among citizens over twenty-three years of age with political rights or are appointed by the court for their expertise. Trials are conducted by the inquisitorial system, in which both judges and assessors play an active part in the questioning of all witnesses. This contrasts with the adversarial system, in which the judge is meant to be an impartial referee between two contending attorneys. After the judge and assessors rule on a case, they pass sentence. An aggrieved party can appeal to the next higher court.

The Organic Law of the People's Courts requires that adjudication committees be established for courts at every level. The committees usually are made up of the president, vice presidents, chief judges, and associate chief judges of the court, who are appointed and removed by the standing committees of the people's congresses at the corresponding level. The adjudication committees are charged with reviewing major cases to find errors in determination of facts or application of law and to determine if a chief judge should withdraw from a case. If a case is submitted to the adjudication committee, the court is bound by its decision. The Supreme People's Court stands at the apex of the judicial structure. Located in Beijing, it has jurisdiction over all lower and special courts, for which it serves as the ultimate appellate court. It is directly responsible to the National People's Congress Standing Committee, which elects the court president.

China also has 'special' military, rail transport, water transport, and forestry courts. These courts hear cases of counter-revolutionary activity, plundering, bribery, sabotage, or indifference to duty that result in severe damage to military facilities, work place, or government property or threaten the safety of soldiers or workers.

Military courts make up the largest group of special courts and try all treason and espionage cases. Although they are independent of civilian courts and directly subordinate to the Ministry of National Defense, military court decisions are reviewed by the Supreme People's Court. Special military courts were first established in 1954 to protect the special interests of all commanders, political commissars, and soldiers, but they ceased to function during the Cultural Revolution (1966–76). Military courts and procuratorates were reinstituted in October 1978, and open military trials resumed in December of that year.

In April 1986, at the Fourth Session of the Sixth National People's Congress, the General Principles of the Civil Code was approved. It is the main source of civil law in the PRC and seeks to provide a uniform framework for interpreting the PRC's civil laws.

After the 1990s, court caseloads had double digit growth as parties increasingly used the legal system to resolve disputes.

=== 21st century ===
In 2007, the doctrine of the Three Supremes was introduced under Hu Jintao, mandating that the judiciary subordinate written law to the interests of the Chinese Communist Party (CCP).

During the late 2000s and early 2010s, there was an increased trend toward interference by local institutional actors, such as local agencies and state-owned enterprises, in judicial matters. Academic Yueduan Wang writes that these interventions generally arose as a result of the court's embeddedness within local party-state institutions and concerns about whether the judiciary might become a source of social instability.

Xi Jinping opposes legal concepts such as separation of powers and judicial independence as "Western erroneous views." Xi has stated that the judiciary is obliged to "uphold the absolute leadership of the Party." Since 2012, all lawyers must pledge a loyalty oath to the Chinese Communist Party. Local departments of justice can revoke the license of lawyers. This power is used to target lawyers who challenge the authority of the state, particularly human rights lawyers. Judicial policies during the general secretaryship of Xi Jinping have highlighted increased professionalization of the judiciary and autonomy in routine cases, while maintaining the subordination of the judiciary to the CCP. Xi has emphasized eliminating "judicial corruption and court decisions influenced by money, power, and personal connection." In 2014, Xi announced Comprehensive Law-Based Governance as a major banner of state legal policy.

In 2013, the SPC issued Opinions Concerning Sentencing Guidelines for Frequently Committed Offences, which aimed to achieve consistency in sentencing for similar offenses. Therefore, China divided the guidelines into four sections: the guiding principles of sentencing, basic sentence methodology, applications of common mitigating and aggravating factors, and sentences for common offences. These guidelines introduced a methodology for calculating sentences, involving three components: a sentencing starting point, a baseline sentence, and a final sentence. The starting point was determined based on the primary constituent facts of a crime, while the baseline sentence considered secondary facts related to the offense. A final sentence was derived from an adjusted baseline sentence, considering various mitigating and aggravating factors. However, these guidelines were only applicable to less serious offenses, leaving serious crimes without specific guidance.

In October 2014, the fourth plenary session of the 18th Central Committee of the Chinese Communist Party announced a focus on "comprehensively deepening law-based governance". From 2014 to 2017, the judicial system underwent significant reform aimed at curbing judicial favoritism. Among the key reform provisions was recentralizing personnel appointments and fiscal management of basic and intermediate courts, with these decisions now being made by provincial governments. This Judicial Centralization Reform aimed to insulate the judiciary from unsanctioned local influence. An analysis published in 2024 by academics Zhenhuan Lei and Yishuang Li found that the win rate of local litigants declined by one-third after the Judicial Centralization Reform and concluded that the reform had weakened local political and economic influence over courts. The Judicial Accountability System sought to empower frontline judges by reducing reliance on the court adjudication committee and eliminating the requirements for court leadership to approve judgments.

In 2015, the Supreme People's Court issued its Opinions on Comprehensively Deepening the Reform of the People's Courts, which detailed measures to restructure the judiciary. These included the Judicial Centralization Reform and the Judicial Accountability Reform, which sought to increase judicial independence from local governments and to reduce influence on lower level judges from higher judicial authorities.

The Judicial Centralization Reform transferred personnel and budgetary power from local party-state authorities to the provincial level. This reform improved financial stability for courts in less economically developed rural areas.

In 2020, the doctrine of the Three Supremes was expanded with the "Eleven Upholds" as part of Xi Jinping Thought on the Rule of Law.

The 2021 Education and Rectification Campaign of the Political-Legal Organizations aimed to curb corruption and extrajudicial interventions in the court system. It was a follow-up to the broader 2018 Sweep Black campaign against organized crime, which had exposed collusion between organized crime and judicial officials (such as the paying of bribes for compassionate release).

The Chinese government promotes the development of a "smart court" system to increase the use of technology such as artificial intelligence and blockchain to streamline proceedings. The Hangzhou Internet Court was the first court in China to accept blockchain evidence to prove the content of a website at a particular point in time, rather than the public notary method traditionally used to do so.

In February 2023, the General Office of the Chinese Communist Party issued a text titled Opinions on Strengthening Legal Education and Legal Theory Research in the New Era that called for purging "Western erroneous views" from legal education, including constitutional government, separation of powers, and judicial independence.

==== Administrative reforms ====
The Judicial Accountability System reorganized courts' internal structures with the goal of ensuring "the one who tries the case makes the judgment, and the one who makes the judgment, and the one who makes the judgment takes responsibility." Major changes included: (1) removing the authority of court leaders to review and approve opinions drafted by frontline judges, (2) reducing the involvement of adjudication committees in case deliberations, (3) establishing judges conferences to provide nonbinding guidance to frontline judges on complex cases, (4) creating the "lifelong accountability framework" to hold judges personally responsible for the quality and legality of their judgments.

Xi's judicial reforms eliminated the Case Approval System. The Case Approval System had required frontline judges to submit rulings to higher level court officials for approval prior to finalizing them; this system had been criticized for limiting judicial independence.

As part of the Judicial Accountability System, in 2015 the Supreme People's Court introduced the Four Types of Cases framework for evaluating whether cases could be referred away from frontline judge review to collective deliberation by the court. The Four Types of Cases subject to referral are (1) cases involving group disputes affecting social stability (like labor strikes or mass protest), complex or difficult cases with significant social impact (like high-profile environmental cases), cases where the ruling may conflict with a prior ruling by the same or higher court, and cases where allegations of judicial misconduct are made. After inconsistent implementation, in 2021 the SPC issued a Guiding Opinion that provided for specific measures that court leadership could apply in the Four Types of Cases, including changing from a single frontline judge to a panel, reassigning the providing judge, changing the number of judges in the collegial panel or appointing themselves as the head of the collegial panel.

In 2015, China began publishing all court decisions in civil and criminal cases across all tiers of the judiciary. This database, the China Judgment Online database, is the world's largest collection of judicial decisions. Although the Supreme People's Court mandates that all local courts upload their judgments, the local courts' compliance with this mandate varies. In 2021, millions of court verdicts were removed, including all capital punishment verdicts. In 2023, administrative proceedings were also removed.

In the late 2010s, the Litigation Source Management Campaign expanded the use of lay mediation as an alternative to litigation, based on the theory that mediation was a more accessible and quicker alternative to formal adjudication. The campaign re-routed a significant volume of disputes from the judiciary. According to academic Yueduan Wang, the campaign also reduced political pressures on courts by re-routing cases that might be considered politically contentious and reduced the risk of local authorities attempting extrajudicial interventions in such cases.

The Supreme People's Court in 2018 began promoting the Mobile Micro Court app. As of March 2020, over 1.3 million people had used the Mobile Micro Court app and over 437,000 cases had been filed through it.

In 2019, the city of Hangzhou established a pilot program artificial intelligence-based Internet Court to adjudicate disputes related to ecommerce and internet-related intellectual property claims. Parties appear before the court via videoconference and AI evaluates the evidence presented and applies relevant legal standards. Following the Hangzhou Internet Court, the Beijing Internet Court and Guangzhou Internet Court were established. In these courts, all aspects of the judicial process from case filing through conclusion are handled online. Major cities including Shanghai, Tianjin, Shenzhen, Wuhan, and Chengdu have established specialized court divisions for cases arising from online disputes.

In 2023, China introduced the Case Review System, which some commentators have compared to a partial revival of the Case Approval System. According to SPC President Zhang Jun:

The Case Review System fundamentally differs from the Case Approval System. If the division chief disagrees with the opinion of the presiding judge or the judge panel, the division chief cannot directly alter or change the decision. Instead, they may suggest a reconsideration, request a discussion at a conference of professional judges, or submit the case to the court leadership for discussion by the adjudication committee.

== See also ==
- Chinese law
- Law enforcement in the People's Republic of China
- Law of the People's Republic of China
- Legal Daily
- Legal history of China
- Legislative system of the People's Republic of China
- Ministry of Justice of the People's Republic of China
