= Three Supremes =

Chinese Communist Party legal doctrine

- Simplified Chinese: 三个至上
Transcriptions
Standard Mandarin
- Hanyu Pinyin: Sān ge Zhìshàng

The "Three Supremes" is a doctrine first articulated by general secretary of the Chinese Communist Party Hu Jintao in December 2007, which requires the judiciary of the People's Republic of China to subordinate written law to the interests of the Chinese Communist Party (CCP). As Hu Jintao put it during the 2007 National Conference on Political-Legal Work, "In their work, the grand judges and grand procurators shall always regard as supreme the party's cause, the people's interest and the constitution and laws."

The "Three Supremes" are as follows:

1. Supremacy of the business of the CCP (Chinese: 党的事业至上)
2. Supremacy of the interests of the people (Chinese: 人民利益至上)
3. Supremacy of the Constitution and the laws (Chinese: 宪法法律至上)

In March 2008, CCP functionary Wang Shengjun was confirmed as the president of the Supreme People's Court (SPC). Unlike predecessors who had placed emphasis on legal training, the tenure of Wang Shengjun (who has no formal legal training himself) has been defined by mandating the study of the Three Supremes theory, and by his emphasis on the need to uphold the leadership of the CCP.

The launch of the Three Supremes, and corresponding appointment of Wang Shengjun to the SPC, was viewed by some legal scholars as an example of backsliding in the development of an independent, autonomous, and competent legal community. Many legal scholars in China believe that the Three Supremes serves to "enshrine the notion that the law must serve the basic strategic interests of the CCP by taking into primary consideration the CCP's own notion of pressing national priorities, interests and realities." Some scholars have perceived Xi Jinping's 2020 speech announcing the "Eleven Upholds" as a reflection and continuation of the Three Supremes.

== See also ==
- Ideology of the Chinese Communist Party
- Law of the People's Republic of China
- Xi Jinping Thought on the Rule of Law
