= Political and Legal Affairs Commission of the Central Military Commission =

Agency for Chinese military law enforcement

- 中华人民共和国中央军事委员会政法委员会; Zhōnghuá Rénmín Gònghéguó Zhōngyāng Jūnshì Wěiyuánhuì Zhèngfǎ Wěiyuánhuì
- National emblem of China

Agency overview
- Formed: 16 January 2016; 10 years ago
- Type: First-level functional agency of the Central Military Commission; Highest organ of Military Justice management
- Jurisdiction: People's Liberation Army, People's Armed Police, Militia
- Headquarters: August 1st Building, Beijing
- Agency executive: Vacant, Secretary

The Political and Legal Affairs Commission of the Central Military Commission" (中国共产党中央军事委员会政法委员会) is a first-level functional agency of the Central Military Commission and a deputy theater-grade military unit. It is the main coordination and control organ for all matters related to military justice and law enforcement. It is based in Beijing.

== History ==
In 2007, the Central Military Commission ordered the establishment of Political and Legal Affairs Committees (政法委员会) in every PLA unit above the Corps grade, headed usually by the Secretary of Discipline Inspection Commission of the unit, as part of the accelerating campaign against corruption in the military. The CMC established a PLAC at the central level as well, and ordered intensive training on the management of legal affairs to all the involved officers. This generalization of party committee participation in legal enforcement in the PLA was the precursor of the later reforms.

=== Post-2015 reforms ===
After the 2015 military reforms, the committee was reorganized into the Political and Legal Affairs Committee of the Central Military Commission in January 2016. The commission was organized as a coordinating body, with a secretary and deputy secretary, and members appointed from the Chinese People's Liberation Army Military Court, Chinese People's Liberation Army Military Procuratorate, and the various bureaus of Political and Legal Commission itself. The plan also stipulated that the Political and Legal Committees in all the PLA units should follow the guidance of the commission, while taking responsibility for the management of the political and legal work in their units.

This implied a division of labor according to the operational/administrative lines of command, with the Committees of the Theater Command level being in charge of legal action during wartime and major operations, as well as being in charge of coordinating law enforcement cases and of regional cooperation. The Committees of the military branches are responsible for general crime prevention, maintenance of probity of the forces, and guaranteeing security and stability within its branches' units. All local unit party committees must report, consult and coordinate with the CMC-PLC.

== Organization ==
Following the 2015 reforms, the structure of the commission is as follows:

=== Subordinate Units ===
- General Office (综合局)
- Political Work Bureau (政治工作局)
- Security Bureau (保卫局)
- PLA's Military Procuratorate (中国人民解放军军事检察院) (Deputy Theater Grade)
- PLA's Military Court (中国人民解放军军事法院) (Deputy Theater Grade)
- PLA's General Court (中国人民解放军总直属军事法院)
- PLA's General Military Procuratorate (中国人民解放军总直属军事检察院)
- Military Prison Bureau (军事监狱)

== Leadership History ==
PLA Legal Affairs Party Committee Secretary

1. General Sun Zhongtong (孙忠同)（2007年—2009年，总政治部副主任、中央军委纪委书记兼）
2. Admiral Tong Shiping (童世平)（2009年—2012年，总政治部副主任、中央军委纪委书记兼）
3. General Du Jincai (杜金才（2012年—2016年，总政治部副主任、中央军委纪委书记、中央纪委副书记、中央政法委委员兼）

CMC Political and Legal Affairs Commission Secretary

1. Lieutenant General Li Xiaofeng (李晓峰)（2016年—2017年1月）
2. Lt General Song Dan (宋丹) （2017年1月—2019年12月）
3. Vice Admiral Wang Renhua (王仁华)（2019年12月—2025年12月）

CMC Political and Legal Affairs Commission Deputy Secretary

- Airforce Major General Liu Xunyan 刘训言（2016年1月－2017年8月）
- Rear Admiral Wang Renhua (王仁华)（2018年4月—2019年12月）
