= Chen Qihan =

Chinese general

- 陈奇涵
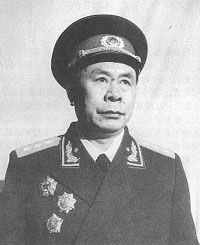
- Chen Qihan

President of PLA Military Court
- In office February 1954 – April 1957
- Preceded by: New title
- Succeeded by: Zhong Hanhua

Personal details
- Born: 23 September 1897 Xingguo County, Jiangxi, Qing China
- Died: 19 June 1981 (aged 83) Beijing, People's Republic of China
- Party: Chinese Communist Party
- Education: Republic of China Military Academy

Military service
- Allegiance: People's Republic of China
- Branch/service: People's Liberation Army Ground Force
- Rank: General

Chinese name
- Simplified Chinese: 陈奇涵
- Traditional Chinese: 陳奇涵
Transcriptions
Standard Mandarin
- Hanyu Pinyin: Chén Qíhán

Chen Qihan (Chinese: 陈奇涵; pinyin: Chén Qíhán; 24 August 1897 – 19 June 1981) was a general in the People's Liberation Army of China.

== Biography ==
Chen was born in Xingguo, Jiangxi, on 24 August 1897. He secretly joined the Chinese Communist Party in 1925.

In October 1930, Chen became the head of Teaching regiment of Red Third Army. Shortly he became the chief of staff in Red Fourth Army, and later chief of staff in Red Third Army. In March 1932, he became the chief of staff in Red First Army Group.

After 1943, he studied at the Central Party School of the Chinese Communist Party.

In 1945, he became the vice commander of Hebei-Rehe-Liaoning Military Region, and went to Northeast. In the winter of 1947, he was the vice commander of Dongman (Jilin) Military Region. In the summer of 1948, he became commander of Liaoning Military Region. After Liaoshen campaign, he became the chief of staff in Northeast Military Region.

In May 1949, he was appointed as the commander of Jiangxi Military Region, and in 1952 became the chairman of Jiangxi Political Consultative Conference.

He was made a general in 1955.

He died on 19 June 1981 in Beijing.

Military offices
New title	President of PLA Military Court; 1954–1957	Succeeded by Zhong Hanhua
