= Hangzhou Internet Court =

Chinese court of special jurisdiction

Hangzhou Internet Court is a court of special jurisdiction in China.

The court was established on August 18, 2017, based on Hangzhou Railway Transport Court. It hears Internet-related cases like contract disputes involving online shopping, services and copyright infringement.

On August 16, 2017, the fourth meeting of the Standing Committee of the 13th People's Congress of Hangzhou appointed the President, Vice President and Judges of the Hangzhou Internet Court. On August 18, 2017, the Hangzhou Internet Court was officially inaugurated, with the sign hanging on the Hangzhou Railway Transportation Court.

The court adjudicates disputes related to ecommerce and internet-related intellectual property claims. Parties appear before the court via videoconference and AI evaluates the evidence presented and applies relevant legal standards. The Hangzhou Internet Court was the first court in China to accept blockchain evidence to prove the content of a website at a particular point in time, rather than the public notary method traditionally used to do so.

In the Hangzhou Internet Court, all aspects of the judicial process from case filing through conclusion are handled online. On average, cases take 38 days from start to finish.

Following the success of the Hangzhou Internet Court, the Beijing Internet Court and Guangzhou Internet Court were established. In these courts, all aspects of the judicial process from case filing through conclusion are handled online. Major cities including Shanghai, Tianjin, Shenzhen, Wuhan, and Chengdu have established specialized court divisions for cases arising from online disputes.

== See also ==
- Judicial system of China
