= Xi Jinping Thought on the Rule of Law =

Doctrine of the People's Republic of China

Xi Jinping Thought on the Rule of Law (Chinese: 习近平法治思想) is the current doctrine of the Chinese Communist Party regarding law. It is a part of the larger Xi Jinping Thought, which is derived from the speeches of general secretary of the Chinese Communist Party Xi Jinping. It was first announced during the Central Conference on Comprehensively Promoting the Rule of Law, held in November 2020.

== History ==
The first Central Conference on Comprehensively Promoting the Rule of Law in the Chinese Communist Party's history was held from November 16 to 17, 2020. Xi Jinping Thought on the Rule of Law was first proposed and established during the conference defined as the guiding ideology for comprehensively promoting the rule of law. The conference also instructed the whole country to study the Thought as "one of the pivotal pillars of the ideological complex that supports the country in the years to come".

In June 2021, the Research Center for Xi Jinping Thought on Rule of Law was established in the China Law Society with the approval of the CCP Central Committee. At a speech during the launch, China Law Society Director Wang Chen called the Thought "the latest achievement in the Sinicization of Marxist theory on the rule of law".

== Content ==
According to the Central Conference on Comprehensively Promoting the Rule of Law, Xi Jinping Thought on the Rule of Law is made up of "eleven upholds". These insist on:

1. Uphold overall CCP leadership in law-based governance;
2. Uphold a "people-centered approach;"
3. Uphold the rule of law under socialism with Chinese characteristics;
4. Uphold Constitution-based governance and exercise of state power;
5. Uphold the rule of law in modernizing the state system and capacity for governance;
6. Uphold the construction of a system of socialist rule of law with Chinese characteristics;
7. Uphold the coordinated progress in law-based governance, exercise of state power, and government administration; and integrate the rule of law for the country, the government, and society;
8. Uphold the facilitation of sound lawmaking, strict law enforcement, impartial administration of justice, and the observance of law by all;
9. Uphold the integrated progress of the domestic rule of law and the foreign-related rule of law;
10. Uphold the development of a force of high-caliber legal personnel with moral integrity and professional competence;
11. Uphold the requirement that leading officials, though small in number, play a key role in implementing the rule of law.

== Analysis ==
Some scholars have raised concerns about potential extraterritorial jurisdiction implications of Xi Jinping Thought on the Rule of Law. Others argue that its globally-focused rhetoric is mostly aimed at strengthening the party-state domestically.

== See also ==
- Three Supremes
- Socialist law
- Chinese law
- Central Political and Legal Affairs Commission
