= Shanghai Financial Court =

Court in Shanghai, China

- 上海金融法院
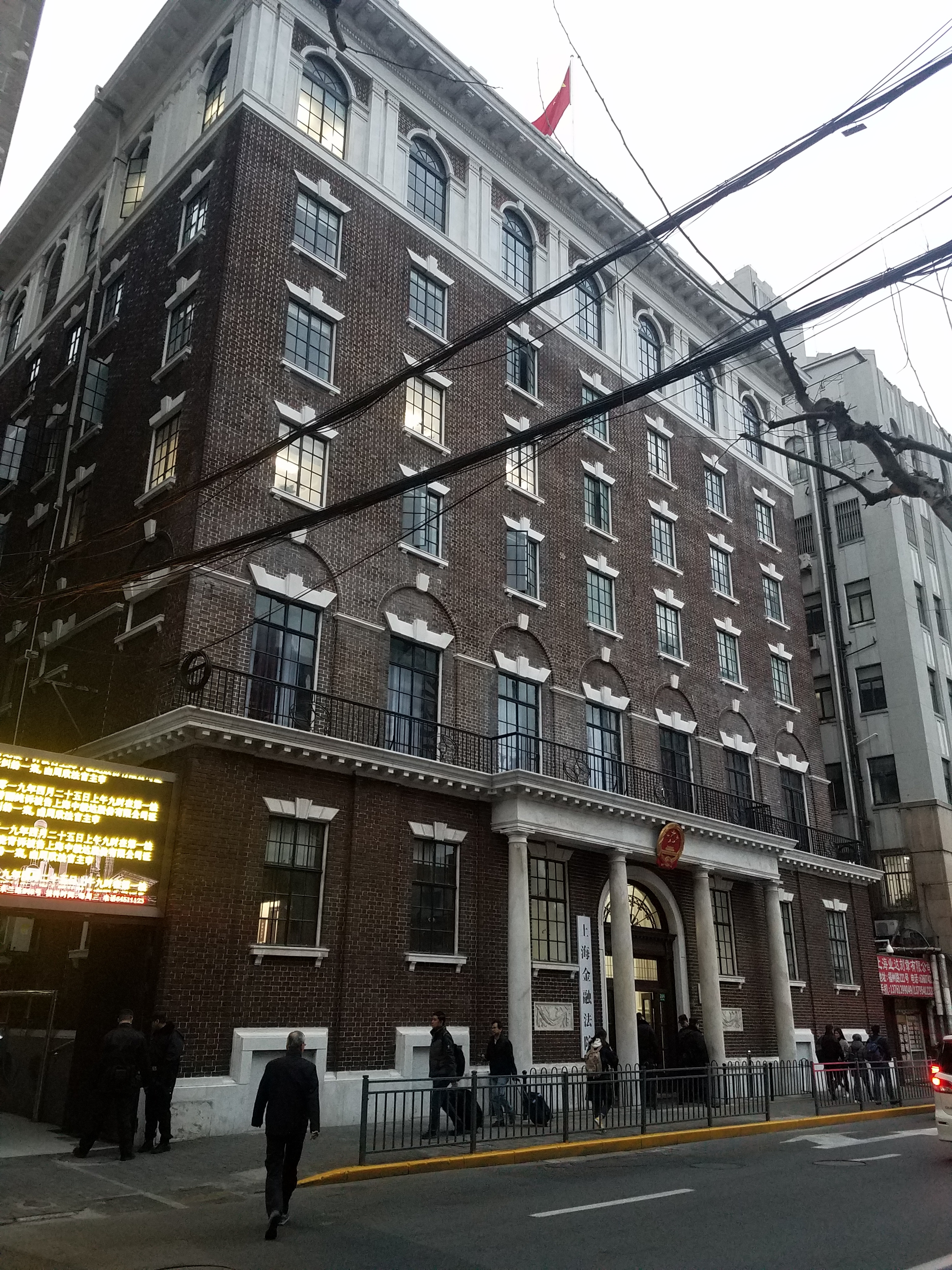
- Original Shanghai Financial Court building
- Established: August 20, 2018
- Jurisdiction: Financial cases
- Location: 611 Qiancheng Road, Pudong New Area, Shanghai, 201204
- Authorised by: Shanghai Higher People's Court
- Website: shjrfy.hshfy.sh.cn

President
- Currently: Zhao Hong

The Shanghai Financial Court is the first specialized financial court to be established the People's Republic of China. It was established in August 2018 to provide specialized handling of finance related cases.

== History ==
=== Establishment of financial tribunals ===
In November 2008, the first Basic People's Court financial tribunal in the People's Republic of China was established in Shanghai Pudong New Area People's Court. Since then, the Shanghai Higher People's Court, the Intermediate People's Court and some basic level courts successively established professional financial tribunals to handle financial and commercial cases uniformly.

=== Proposals for establishment of financial court ===
In January 2010, at the Third Meeting of the Eleventh Session of the Shanghai Political Consultative Conference, Zhang Ning of the Shanghai Municipal CPPCC Standing Committee, Lu Hongbing and Xie Rongxing submitted a proposal for the establishment of a Shanghai Financial Court. Subsequently, the vice chairmen of the Shanghai CPPCC Zhu Xiaoming and Gao Xiaomei took the proposal to the president of the Shanghai Higher People's Court, Ying Yong, for consideration. Ying highly evaluated the proposal and the proposal was taken forward by the Shanghai Higher People's Court, resulting in a decision that year to "hold for future reference".

On January 24, 2015, the third session of the 12th Shanghai Municipal Political Consultative Conference was opened. Lu Hongbing wrote - and Zhang Ning and other 11 members of the Shanghai CPPCC jointly submitted - a proposal on the establishment of a financial court in Shanghai Drawing on the precedent set by Shanghai Intellectual Property Court and Shanghai Third Intermediate People's Court, consideration was given to setting up the Shanghai Financial Court within the Shanghai First Intermediate People's Court, and, when conditions were ripe, to give further consideration to the establishment of an independent Shanghai Financial Court. The president of the Shanghai Higher People's Court, Cui Yadong, also considered that it was necessary to set up the Shanghai Financial Court. This proposal was included in the proposal of the Shanghai Municipal Political Consultative Conference for key consultations in 2015. The result was "included in plans to be finalised".

In 2017, the vice chairman of the Shanghai CPPCC Li Yiping led a team to Macau and Hong Kong to investigate the handling of financial cases. The research team said in a special report that it was "very necessary" to establish a special financial court in Shanghai.

During the national "two session" period in 2018, Lu Hongbing, a member of the National Committee of the Chinese People's Political Consultative Committee, and Shanghai International Studies University Associate Professor Huang Wei and others resubmitted the "Proposal on the Establishment of Shanghai Financial Court".

=== Approval of establishment of court ===
On March 28, 2018, General Secretary of the CPC Central Committee, President, Chairman of the Central Military Commission and Director of the Central Comprehensive Deepening Reform Commission, Xi Jinping, presided over the first meeting of the Central Comprehensive Deepening Reform Committee and delivered a speech. The meeting reviewed and approved the "Proposal on the Establishment of Shanghai Financial Court".

On April 27, 2018, The Standing Committee of the 13th National People's Congress passed the "Decision of the Standing Committee of the National People's Congress on the Establishment of the Shanghai Financial Court" in effect from April 28, 2018 deciding to set up the Shanghai Financial Court.

On July 31, 2018, the 1746th Meeting of the Supreme People's Court Judicial Committee 1746th passed the "Supreme People's Court Regulations on the Jurisdiction of Shanghai Financial Court Cases" which was promulgated on August 7, 2018 and came into effect from August 10, 2018.

=== Establishment of court ===
On August 20, 2018, the Shanghai Financial Court was formally established, China Communist Party Shanghai Committee Secretary Li Qiang and NPC Standing Committee Vice Chairman Wang Dongming inaugurated the Shanghai Financial Court. On 21 August 2018, the court launched its official website.

== Premises ==
Since July 2025 the court has been located in a new bespoke court building at 611 Qiancheng Road, Pudong.

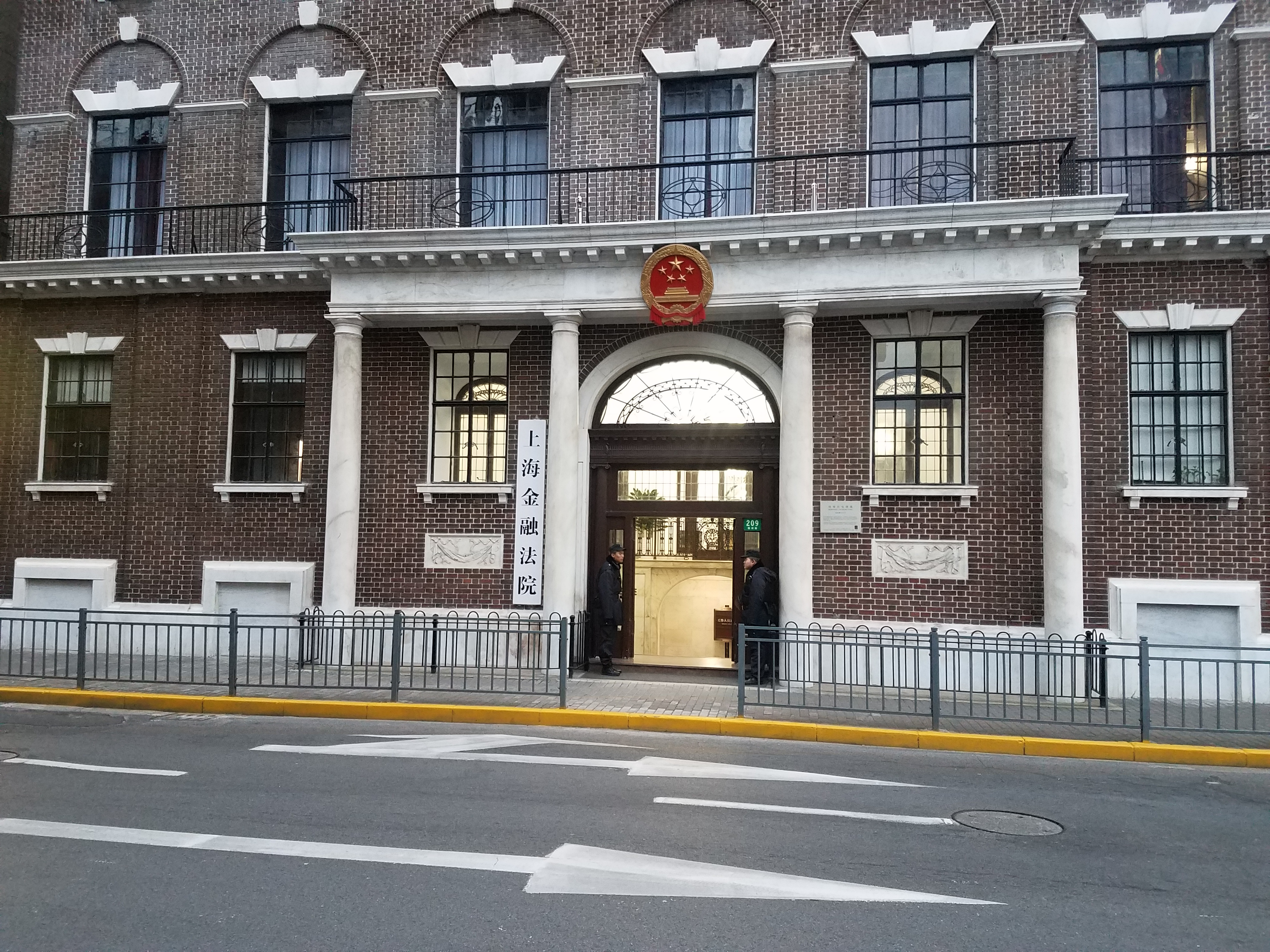
Entrance of the original Shanghai Financial Court building

The court was from 2018 to 2025 located in the former Shanghai American Club building on Fuzhou Road in Shanghai.

Between 1960 and 1991 the building served as the premises of the Shanghai Higher People's Court and Shanghai Second Intermediate Court. The building stood empty until 2018 when renovation works for the court were commenced.

== Jurisdiction ==
Provisions of the Supreme People's Court on the Jurisdiction of Shanghai Financial Court Cases:

Article One The Shanghai Financial Court shall have jurisdiction as the intermediate people's court of first instance in Shanghai over the following financial civil and commercial cases:

- 1. disputes involving securities, futures, trusts, insurance, negotiable instruments, letters of credit, financial lending contracts, bank cards, financial lease contracts, entrusting financial contracts, pawnings, etc.;
- 2. new types of financial civil and commercial disputes involving independent guarantees, factoring, privately offered fund, online payment of non-bank payment agencies, online lending, internet-based equity crowdfunding, etc.;
- 3. bankruptcy disputes where financial institutions are the debtors;
- 4. judicial review cases on arbitration of financial civil and commercial disputes; and
- 5. recognition and enforcement of foreign judgments or rulings involving financial civil and commercial disputes.

Article Two The Shanghai Financial Court shall have jurisdiction as the intermediate people's courts of first instance in Shanghai over financial administrative cases in which financial regulators are defendants.

Article Three The Shanghai Financial Court shall have jurisdiction as courts of first instance over financial civil and commercial cases and financial administrative cases in which financial market infrastructures with domiciles in Shanghai are the defendants or the third parties and disputes are involving performance of their respective functions.

Article Four The Shanghai Financial Court shall accept appeals against a judgment or ruling of a district court of first instance in Shanghai on a financial civil and commercial dispute or a financial administrative case.

Article Five The Shanghai High People's Court shall accept appeals against a judgment or ruling of the Shanghai Financial Court of first instance.

Article Six Cases accepted by a competent intermediate people's court of Shanghai before the establishment of the Shanghai Financial Court shall continue to be tried by the intermediate people's court previously seized.

== Leadership ==
President

- Zhao Hong (July 24, 2018—)

Vice-Presidents

- Lin Xiaonie (July 27, 2018—)
- Xiao Kai (July 27, 2018-)

Party Secretary

- Zhao Hong
