= Primary people's court =

A primary people's court (simplified Chinese: 基层人民法院; traditional Chinese: 基層人民法院; pinyin: Jīcéng Rénmín Fǎyuàn) is a lowest level court in the Courts of General Jurisdiction in the People's Republic of China. According to the Organic Law of the People's Courts of the People's Republic of China, the basic people's courts handle the first instance cases at the local level.

Basic people's courts are set up at the county and district level. They consist of a president, vice president, and judges. A basic court may be further divided into criminal, civil, and economic divisions. Basic people's courts also handle cases that are deemed too trivial to require a trial.

== See also ==
- Judicial system of China
  - Local people's court
