= Fourth plenary session of the 18th Central Committee of the Chinese Communist Party =

Event held in Beijing

Fourth plenary session of the 18th Central Committee of the Chinese Communist Party 中国共产党第十八届中央委员会第四次全体会议
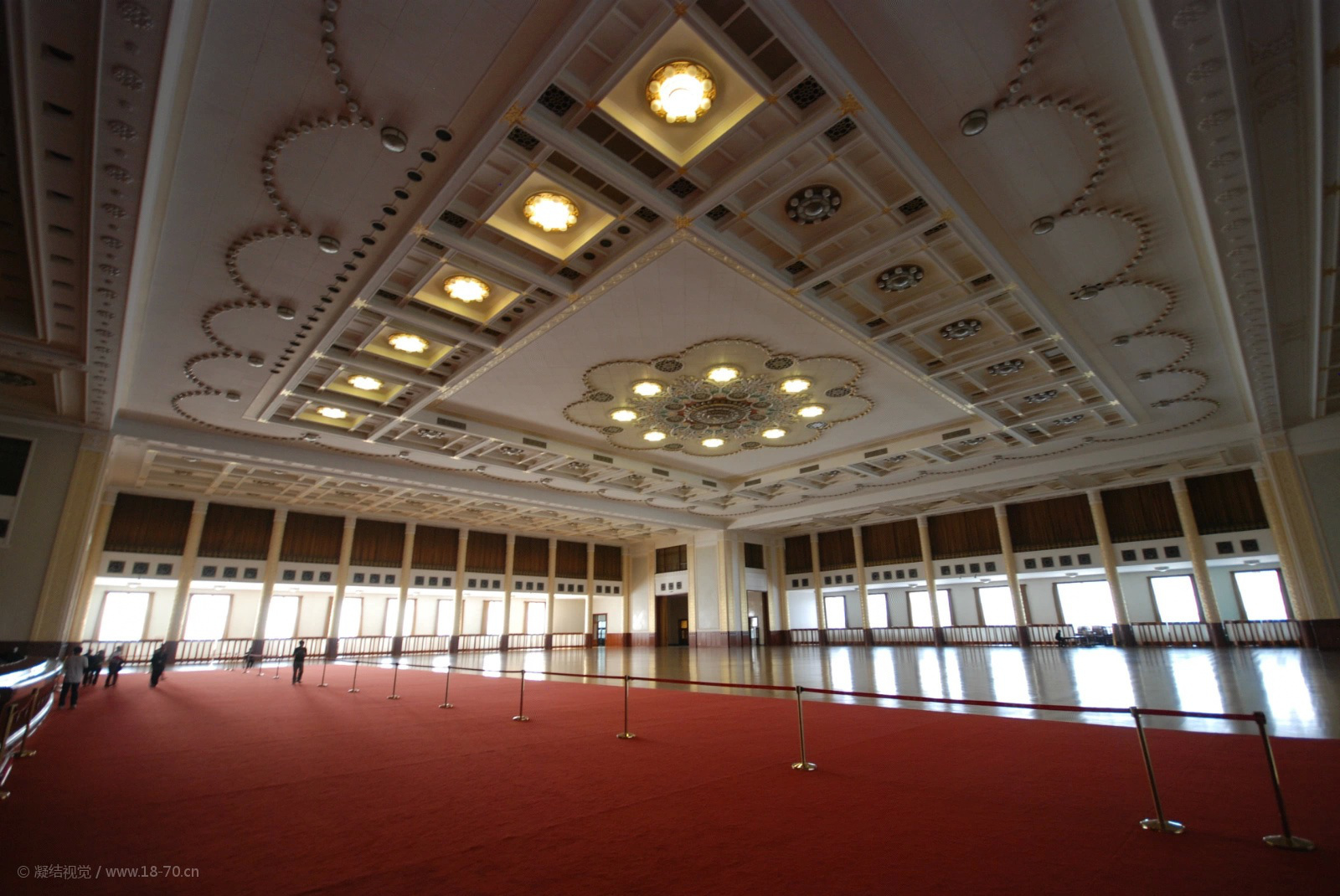
- Panoramic view of the Banquet Hall in the Great Hall of the People
- Date: October 20–23, 2014
- Locations: Banquet Hall, Great Hall of the People, Beijing, China
- Previous event: Fifth plenary session of the 18th Central Committee
- Next event: Third plenary session of the 18th Central Committee
- Participants: 199 Central Committee members 164 Central Committee alternate members
- General Secretary: Xi Jinping

Fourth plenary session of the 18th Central Committee of the Chinese Communist Party
- Simplified Chinese: 中国共产党第十八届中央委员会第四次全体会议
- Traditional Chinese: 中國共產黨第十八屆中央委員會第四次全體會議
Transcriptions
Standard Mandarin
- Hanyu Pinyin: Zhōngguó Gòngchǎndǎng Dìshíbā Jiè Zhōngyāng Wěiyuánhuì Dìsìcì Quántǐ Huìyì

Abbreviation
- Simplified Chinese: 中共十八届四中全会
- Traditional Chinese: 中共十八屆四中全會
Transcriptions
Standard Mandarin
- Hanyu Pinyin: Zhōnggòng Shíbājiè Sìzhōng Quánhuì

The fourth plenary session of the 18th Central Committee of the Chinese Communist Party was convened from October 20 to 23, 2014. The plenary session listened to and discussed the work report made by CCP General Secretary Xi Jinping on behalf of the 18th Politburo, and reviewed and adopted the Decision of the CCP Central Committee on Several Major Issues Concerning Comprehensively Promoting the Rule of Law.

== Preparation ==
On July 29, at a meeting of the Politburo chaired by Xi Jinping, it was decided that the Fourth Plenary Session of the 18th CCP Central Committee would be held in October this year. The main agenda of the plenary session was to study major issues concerning the comprehensive advancement of the rule of law. On the same day, Xinhua News Agency released the "Notice of the CCP Central Committee on the Investigation of Zhou Yongkang". At the meeting of the Politburo held on September 30, the specific date of the Fourth Plenary Session was determined to be October 20 to 23.

== Meeting ==
The Fourth Plenum was themed on comprehensively deepening law-based governance. Objectives included insulating courts from improper interferences, preventing cadre from influencing disciplinary activities and mandating discipline for violations.

=== Comprehensively promote the rule of law ===
- Optimize the allocation of judicial powers and explore the establishment of people's courts and people's procuratorates across administrative divisions.
- Improve the decision-making mechanism based on the law, and propose the establishment of a lifelong accountability and responsibility tracing mechanism for major decisions.
- Incorporate the effectiveness of the rule of law construction into the performance evaluation index system.
- Improve the constitutional supervision system of the National People's Congress and its Standing Committee.
- Establish a system for reporting and holding accountable leading officials who interfere with judicial affairs.

=== New system ===
- National Constitution Day and constitutional oath system.
- The Supreme People's Court establishes circuit courts.
- Explore the establishment of people's courts and people's procuratorates across administrative divisions.
- Explore the establishment of a system for procuratorates to initiate public interest litigation.
- Implement a lifelong responsibility system for case handling quality and a system of accountability for tracing the responsibility for wrong cases.

=== Personnel Decisions ===
- The plenary session confirmed the previous decision of the Politburo to expel Li Dongsheng, Jiang Jiemin, Yang Jinshan, Wang Yongchun, Li Chuncheng and Wan Qingliang from the Party.
- In accordance with the provisions of the Party Constitution, the plenary session decided to appoint alternate members Ma Jiantang, Wang Zuo'an and Mao Wanchun as members of the Central Committee.
