= Local people's court =

Local court in People's Republic of China

A local people's court is a local level (first instance) court of the People's Republic of China. According to the Organic Law of the People's Courts, the local people's courts includes:

- High people's courts
- Intermediate people's courts
- Primary people's courts

The Organic Law of the People's Courts of the People's Republic of China (中华人民共和国人民法院组织法) was passed in 1954 for the first time. After the Cultural Revolution, this law was re-passed by the Fifth National People's Congress on July 1, 1979, and amended by the Standing Committee of the National People's Congress on September 2, 1983.

This law has three chapters and 41 articles. It prescribes that the Chinese courts include the Supreme People's Court, local people's courts, and other special courts.

== See also ==
- Judicial system of China
- Court of special jurisdiction
