= Xue Feng =

Chinese-American geologist accused of espionage (born 1965)

- 薛峰
- Born: February 6, 1965 (age 61); Xi'an, Shaanxi, China
- Education: University of Chicago
- Occupation: Geologist
- Employer: formerly IHS Inc.
- Known for: American geologist arrested and tortured in China
- Spouse: Nan Kang
- Children: 2

Xue Feng
- Chinese: 薛峰
Transcriptions
Standard Mandarin
- Hanyu Pinyin: Xuē Fēng
- IPA: [ɕɥé fə́ŋ]

Xue Feng (Chinese: 薛峰; born February 6, 1965) is a Chinese American geologist who worked for IHS Inc. when he was arrested by the Beijing State Security Bureau during a business trip to China in 2007. He was subsequently tortured, charged with espionage, and sentenced to 8 years in prison. On April 3, 2015, he was released from the Beijing No.2 Prison and immediately deported to the U.S.

== Early life and education ==
Xue Feng was born on February 6, 1965, near the city of Xi'an in Shaanxi province in China. While pursuing a geology degree at Xi'an's Northwest University in the late 1980s and early 1990s, he acted as an interpreter and guide for visiting geologists. One geologist that he met, David Rowley, invited him to do his PhD at the University of Chicago.

While at the University of Chicago, Xue Feng worked on ultra-high-pressure metamorphism, a transformation that can be seen in rocks that have been to depths of 70 km or more. He graduated with a doctoral degree in geology. He worked as the Northeast Asia manager for IHS Inc.

Xue has a wife, Nan Kang, and two children.

== Arrest ==
On November 20, 2007, Xue Feng was arrested by the BSSB and charged with "exporting intelligence" for purchasing a commercially available database of Chinese oil wells. Residing in Houston, Texas, Xue was on a business trip for IHS, Inc at the time of his arrest. Following his arrest, human rights activist John Kamm told the Associated Press that the BSSB had ignored the deadlines for notification and visits required by Chinese law and its consular agreement with the U.S., and had not provided US consular officials his whereabouts for more than three weeks following his arrest. Upon finally receiving access to US consular officials, Xue revealed he had been tortured, displaying cigarette burn marks on his arms. After taking office in 2009, President Obama pressed for Xue's release in meetings with Chinese officials, to no avail. Later appeals, attended personally by U.S. ambassador Jon Huntsman, were unsuccessful. During Hu Jintao's state visit to Washington, D.C., members of Congress confronted Hu about Xue. Ileana Ros-Lehtinen, at the time chairwoman of the House Foreign Relations Committee, and Kevin Brady, who represented Xue's Houston district, separately pushed letters into Hu's hands urging Xue's release. After 8 years in the Beijing No.2 prison, he was released and deported to the U.S. on April 3, 2015.

== Publications ==
- Xue, Feng; Rowley, David B.; Baker, Judy (1996). "Refolded syn-ultrahigh-pressure thrust sheets in the south Dabie complex, China: Field evidence and tectonic implications". Geology. 24 (5): 455–458. Bibcode:1996Geo....24..455X. doi:10.1130/0091-7613(1996)024<0455:RSUPTS>2.3.CO;2.
- Rowley, D.B.; Xue, F.; Tucker, R.D.; Peng, Z.X.; Baker, J.; Davis, A. (1997). "Ages of ultrahigh pressure metamorphism and protolith orthogneisses from the eastern Dabie Shan: U/Pb zircon geochronology". Earth and Planetary Science Letters. 151 (3–4): 191–203. Bibcode:1997E&PSL.151..191R. doi:10.1016/S0012-821X(97)81848-1.
- Baker, Judy; Matthews, Alan; Mattey, D.; Rowley, D.; Xue, F. (1997). "Fluid-rock interactions during ultra-high pressure metamorphism, Dabie Shan, China". Geochimica et Cosmochimica Acta. 61 (8): 1685–1696. Bibcode:1997GeCoA..61.1685B. doi:10.1016/S0016-7037(97)00005-7.

== See also ==
- Stern Hu
