= Beijing State Security Bureau =

Part of the Chinese Ministry of State Security

- Chinese: 北京市国家安全局
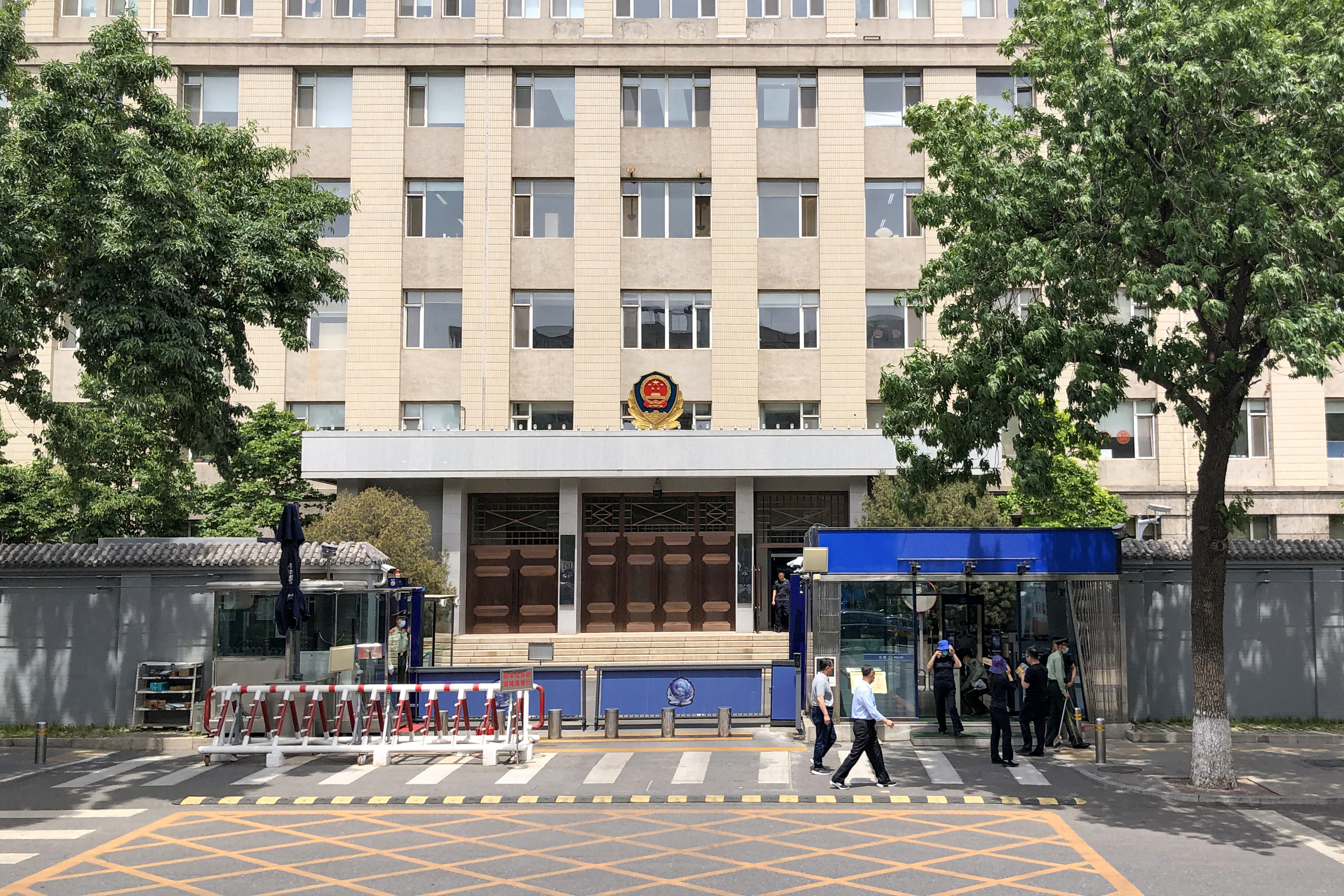
- BSSB listing address at the Beijing Public Security Bureau Headquarters

Bureau overview
- Formed: May 1984; 42 years ago
- Preceding bureau: Beijing Public Security Bureau counterintelligence unit
- Jurisdiction: Beijing, China
- Headquarters: Puhuangyu, Fangzhuang, Fengtai District, Beijing, China
- Bureau executive: Director
- Parent ministry: Ministry of State Security

The Beijing State Security Bureau (Chinese: 北京市国家安全局; pinyin: běijīng shì guójiā ānquán jú; Beijing SSB) is a municipal bureau of China's Ministry of State Security tasked with national security, intelligence and secret policing in the country's capital. Like other state security bureaus, the Beijing bureau is semi-autonomous from the national headquarters of the MSS located across the city while being simultaneously co-located within the Beijing Municipal Public Security Bureau. Established in May 1984 from parts of the Beijing Public Security Bureau, the bureau has been accused of numerous human rights abuses, and has been involved in the arrest of journalists, jailing of dissidents, torture of businessmen, and was responsible for abducting the "two Michael's" used as hostages in exchange for Canada's release of Huawei chief financial officer Meng Wangzhou.

The bureau appears to place a heavy emphasis on internal and political security operations, demonstrated by the operation of its own detention center. While Beijing may be well suited for operations against foreign countries, and nearly all MSS bureaus specialize in one area or another, according to Chinese intelligence expert Peter Mattis, "the huge number of foreign officials and businesspeople living in and transiting the city probably keep the focus on counterintelligence."

The bureau has 21 operational divisions and is headquartered in a nondescript building at Puhuangyu in Fangzhuang subdistrict, Fengtai District of Beijing. One of the most recent additions was the Shijingshan District bureau, established in 2005. The bureau also operates a detention facility which holds sensitive political prisoners transferred from across the country to a central location in Beijing.

== Facilities ==
The headquarters of the BSSB is in the Fengtai District, while the bureau's listing address is No. 9 Qianmen East Street in the Dongcheng District, which is the Beijing Public Security Bureau headquarters.

=== Detention Center ===
The Beijing State Security Bureau Detention Center is a detention facility primarily used to house political prisoners, similar to Russia's Lefortovo Prison in Moscow. In 2019, former Chinese diplomat turned dissident Australian citizen Yang Hengjun was arrested in Guangzhou and transferred to the BSSB Detention Centre to face espionage charges.

== Human rights abuses ==
=== Arrest of journalists ===
In December 2020, the BSSB detained Haze Fan, a Beijing-based assistant reporter for Bloomberg News, on what was purported to be a suspicion of endangering national security. On 14 June 2022, China's embassy in the US told Bloomberg that Haze had been released on bail, although the agency had not made contact with her.

In June 1989, the Beijing bureau was behind the expulsion of Associated Press reporter John Pomfret following his coverage of the Tiananmen Square protests over allegations of his links with student leaders. During the public pronouncement of charges against Pomfret, the bureau revealed its technical competence, displaying images from cameras previously assumed to be traffic cameras, cameras hidden inside restaurants, and raw footage from an ABC News interview that had been intercepted from a satellite transmission to ABC News headquarters in the United States.

=== Arrest of human rights activists ===
In 2005, the BSSB detained Sharon Hom, executive director of Human Rights in China, after she attended an EU-China bilateral human rights dialogue in Beijing.

=== Suppression of free speech ===
In 2006, Yahoo! executives admitted to the U.S. House Foreign Relations Committee that they had allowed two liaison officers with the Beijing State Security Bureau to work in a special Hong Kong-based office within the company. In a subsequent hearing, executives declined to explain why they had provided emails and IP addresses to BSSB authorities which was allegedly used to convict and sentence journalist Shi Tao and blogger Wang Xiaoning to ten years in prison each for "leaking state secrets." The company later settled a civil suit over the matter out of court, and promised changes to the way it handles foreign law enforcement requests. Yahoo! cofounder Jerry Yang later appealed to U.S. Secretary of State Condoleezza Rice to press for the release of the two dissidents prior to her visit to China in 2008.

=== Torture of Xue Feng ===
In November 2007, Chinese American geologist Xue Feng was arrested by the BSSB and charged with "exporting intelligence" for purchasing a commercially available database of Chinese oil wells. Residing in Houston, Texas, Xue was on a business trip for IHS, Inc at the time of his arrest. Following his arrest, human rights activist John Kamm told the Associated Press that the BSSB had ignored the deadlines for notification and visits required by Chinese law and its consular agreement with the U.S., and had not provided US consular officials his whereabouts for more than three weeks following his arrest. Upon finally receiving access to US consular officials, Xue revealed he had been tortured, displaying cigarette burn marks on his arms. After taking office in 2009, President Obama pressed for Xue's release in meetings with Chinese officials, to no avail. Later appeals, attended personally by U.S. ambassador Jon Huntsman, were unsuccessful. During Hu Jintao's state visit to Washington, D.C., members of Congress confronted Hu about Xue. Ileana Ros-Lehtinen, at the time chairwoman of the House Foreign Relations Committee, and Kevin Brady, who represented Xue's Houston district, separately pushed letters into Hu's hands urging Xue's release. After 8 years in the Beijing No.2 prison, he was released and deported to the U.S. on 3 April 2015.

== Involvement in hostage diplomacy ==
Following the 2018 detention and attempted extradition of Huawei chief financial officer Meng Wangzhou in Canada, the MSS arrested and jailed two Canadian citizens, Michael Kovrig of the International Crisis Group, and Michael Spavor, a consultant on relations with North Korea, in what was widely seen as hostage diplomacy to coerce Canada into repatriating Meng. According to Chinese Ministry of Foreign Affairs Spokesperson Lu Kang, the Beijing State Security Bureau and the State Security Bureau of Dandong city in Liaoning, were responsible for abducting the two men. The men were released in 2021 after 1,019 days in MSS custody, just hours after charges against Meng were dropped.

== Involvement in academia ==
In 2018, Peking University announced its new Party Secretary would be former Beijing SSB Party Secretary Qiu Shuiping, who headed the Communist Party's involvement in the bureau from 2013 to 2014. Several outlets noted the rhetoric of the hiring announcement closely mirrored wording from new components of Xi Jinping Thought released just days prior.

== Counterintelligence activities ==
In 2017, the Beijing bureau announced cash bounties of up to ¥500,000 yuan for anyone who reports on what they believe to be foreign espionage activity with the aim of building "an iron Great Wall" counterintelligence program to "combat evil."

== Leadership ==
=== Purge of Liang Ke ===
In January 2014, BSSB director Liang Ke was removed from office and arrested amid a power struggle. As Xi Jinping tightened his control of the Chinese Communist Party (CCP), he waged an anti-corruption campaign to purge his political adversaries, culminating in the downfall of former minister of public security Zhou Yongkang and his political allies, which included MSS vice minister Qiu Jin and his protégé Liang. State media said the investigation into Liang was connected to allegations of corruption and his dealing with Zhou, while other sources reported that he was suspected of monitoring the whereabouts of some members of the Politburo Standing Committee, including Xi Jinping himself.

=== List of directors ===
Fan Shouzhi has held the longest tenure in BSSB leadership, serving as deputy director from October 1986 to December 1996, at which time he was promoted to director, serving through September 2001, before becoming a member of the Beijing Organizing Committee for the Olympic Games.

No.	Director	Took office	Left office	Time in office	Ref.
1	Min Boying (闵步瀛)	10 December 1983	November 1986	2 years, 11 months	
2	Wang Tong (汪统)	November 1986	1988	2 years	
3	Fan Shouzhi (樊守志)	December 1996	September 2001	4 years, 9 months	
4	Wang Chongxun (王崇勋)	27 February 2003	unknown	unknown	
5	Liang Ke (梁克)	18 April 2008	21 February 2014	5 years, 8 months	
7	Li Dong (李东)	21 February 2014	unknown	unknown	

== See also ==
- Beijing Municipal Public Security Bureau
- Beijing Municipal Administration of Prisons
