= List of prisons in Beijing =

This is a list of prisons within Beijing municipality of the People's Republic of China. Many are operated by the Beijing Municipal Administration of Prisons.

Name	Enterprise name	City/County/District	Village/Town	Established	Notes
Beijing Juvenile Offender Detachment	Beijing Direct Current Motor Works	Beijing	Tuanhe		
Beijing Municipal No. 1 Prison	Qinghe Knitting Mill		Xuanwu District		Produces nylon socks for domestic and foreign markets. Includes socks and sewing factory, construction plant, and plastics factory (produces fast food boxes).
Beijing Municipal Prison	Auto Manufacturing Plant	Daxing District		1982	1600 Prisoners (2006)
Beijing Office for Criminal Deportation		Daxing	Tiantanghe	1995	construction area of 28 000 m^{2}
Beijing State Security Bureau Detention Center		Fengtai District	Dahongmen		Prison for political prisoners and foreigners; subordinate to the Beijing State Security Bureau of the Ministry of State Security. Previously known as the Beijing International Prison.
Beijing Women's Prison		Daxing	Tiantanghe	1999	Beijing's only prison for female criminals from Beijing.
Chaobai Prison		Daxing	Tiantanghe	1999	Beijing's only prison for female criminals from Beijing.
Chaobai Prison, Chaxi Prison, a branch of the Qinghe Prison Administration Bureau	Qinghe Farm	Tianjin Municipality	Hangu District	1950	Includes Qinghe Machine Works which produces cell phone batteries. Produces artificially bred pawns, fodder, and television parts.
Liangxiang Prison		Tianjin Municipality	Ninghe County	1956	
Municipal No. 2 Prison		Chaoyang District		1950	
Qincheng Prison		Changping District		1958	For political prisoners, the only prison in China not belonging to the Ministry of Justice; subordinate to the Ministry of Public Security
Qinghe Prison					planned to build a new location in Guangjitun, Yanqing County, unconfirmed information
Yanqing Prison		Guangjitun, Yanqing County			

== Sources ==
- "Laogai Handbook 2007-2008" (PDF) (in Chinese and English). Washington, D.C.: Laogai Research Foundation. October 2008. pp. 47–58. ISBN 978-1-931550-25-3.
