= GOME =

GOME or Gome may refer to:

- GOME Electrical Appliances
- Global Ozone Monitoring Experiment, an instrument on board the ERS-2 satellite.
- Global Ozone Monitoring Experiment-2 an instrument on the MetOp-A satellite
- Gome (drum), a drum among the Ga and Asante people of Ghana
- Guardians of Middle-earth, a video game
