= Beijing Special Weapons and Tactics Unit =

Chinese police tactical unit

Beijing Municipal Public Security Bureau Counter-Terrorism and Special Police Unit
- 北京市公安局反恐怖和特警总队
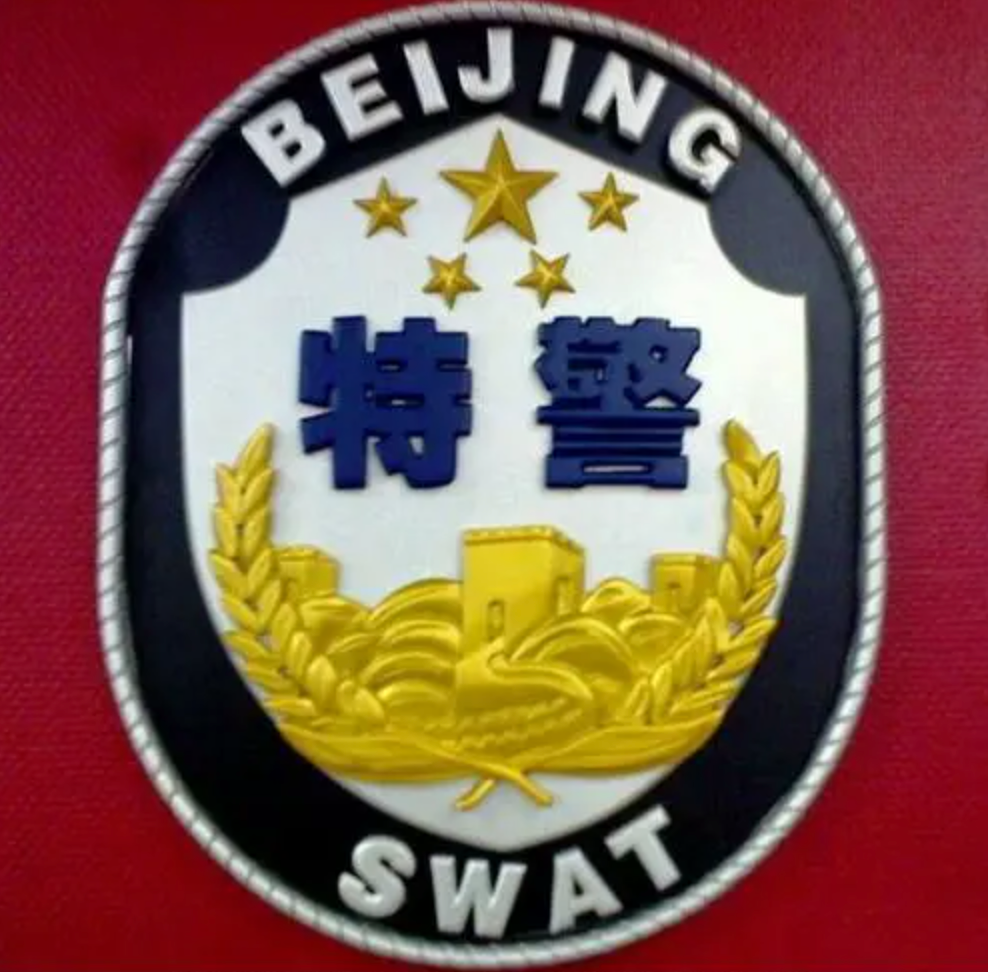
- First Beijing SWAT badge
- Active: December 2005 - present
- Country: China
- Agency: People's Police
- Type: Police tactical unit
- Part of: Beijing Municipal Public Security Bureau
- Headquarters: Beijing
- Common name: Beijing SWAT

Structure
- Officers: 970

Notables
- Significant operation(s): 2008 Beijing Olympics security duties

Website
- https://gaj.beijing.gov.cn/wsgs/zqxx/nsjg/202003/t20200327_1740108.html

The Beijing Municipal Public Security Bureau Counter-Terrorism and Special Police Unit (Chinese: 北京市公安局反恐怖和特警总队), sometimes referred to as Beijing SWAT (Chinese: 北京特警), is a police tactical unit within the Beijing Municipal Public Security Bureau that deals with incidents beyond the capabilities of normal patrol officers such as hostage situations, high risk warrants and riot control.

== History ==
The Beijing SWAT and Snow Leopard Commando Unit (SLCU) were unveiled in a demonstration at the Beijing People's Police College on April 27, 2006, as part of a public relations effort to illustrate the capabilities of the Beijing Police to deal with terrorism issues, protection of delegates, and to enforce law and order in the 2008 Beijing Olympics.

The unit has in recent years received training and advice from Western counter-terrorism units.

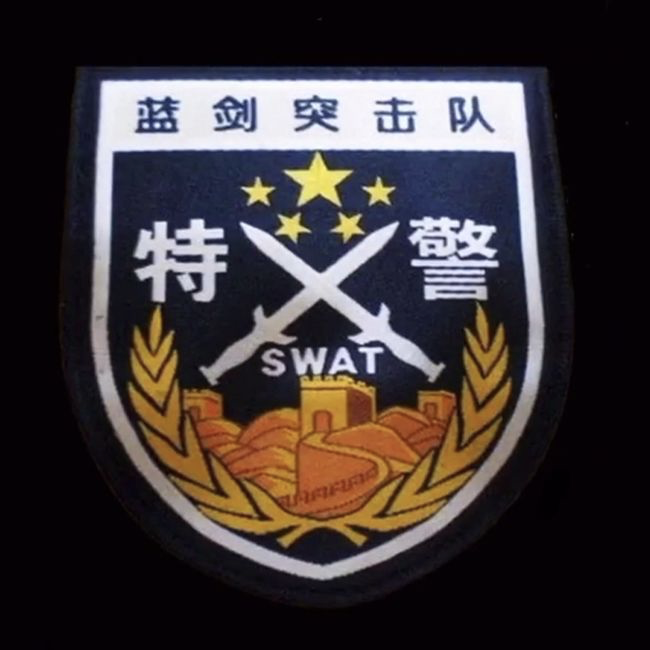
Blue Sword unit insignia

In June 2008, the unit's 120-operator 1st Detachment was nicknamed Blue Sword Commando Unit (Chinese: 蓝剑突击队).

In 2009, the Ministry of Public Security and National anti-terrorism office designated the Blue Sword Commando Unit as one of China's 10 National level anti-terrorism commando units, which are China's main non-military anti-terrorism units and are also responsible for training SWAT in smaller agencies.

== Role ==
Typically expected of a police tactical unit from any country will be the role of a tactical response team to handle hostage-rescue, high-risk warrants, VIP or dangerous criminal escort duties and sometimes counter-terrorism and anti-riot duties.

== Organization ==
The Beijing SWAT is divided into sub-units consisting of but not limited to: an aviation unit (航空队), an underwater diving unit (潜水队), female SWAT unit (女子特警队) and a K9 unit (警犬队).

=== Training ===
Recruits are selected from six colleges, including the Beijing Sports University and Chinese People's Public Security University.

Beijing SWAT members are trained, aside from combat tactics, in many subjects including English, etiquette, cultural dynamics, intelligence gathering, counter-terrorism and anti-riot and anti-nuclear and biological warfare tactics.

All SWAT operatives undergo psychiatric evaluation.

=== Weapons and equipment ===
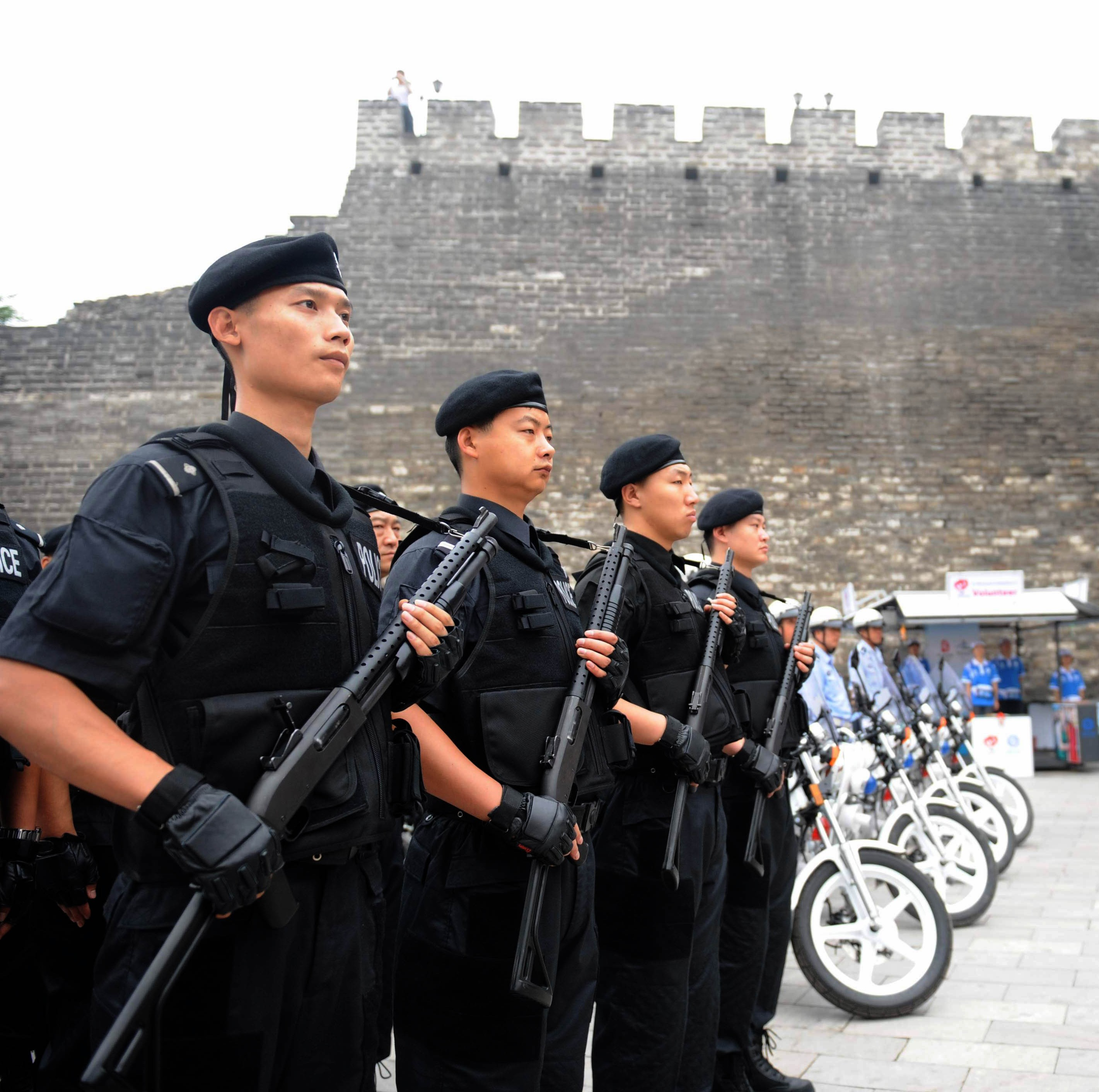
Beijing SWAT officers

It is reputed to be one of the most well-equipped and well-trained of all the tactical units of public security agencies in the PRC.

The unit is armed with a variety of domestically manufactured weapons such as QBZ-95 assault rifles and QSZ-92 pistols.

Vehicles

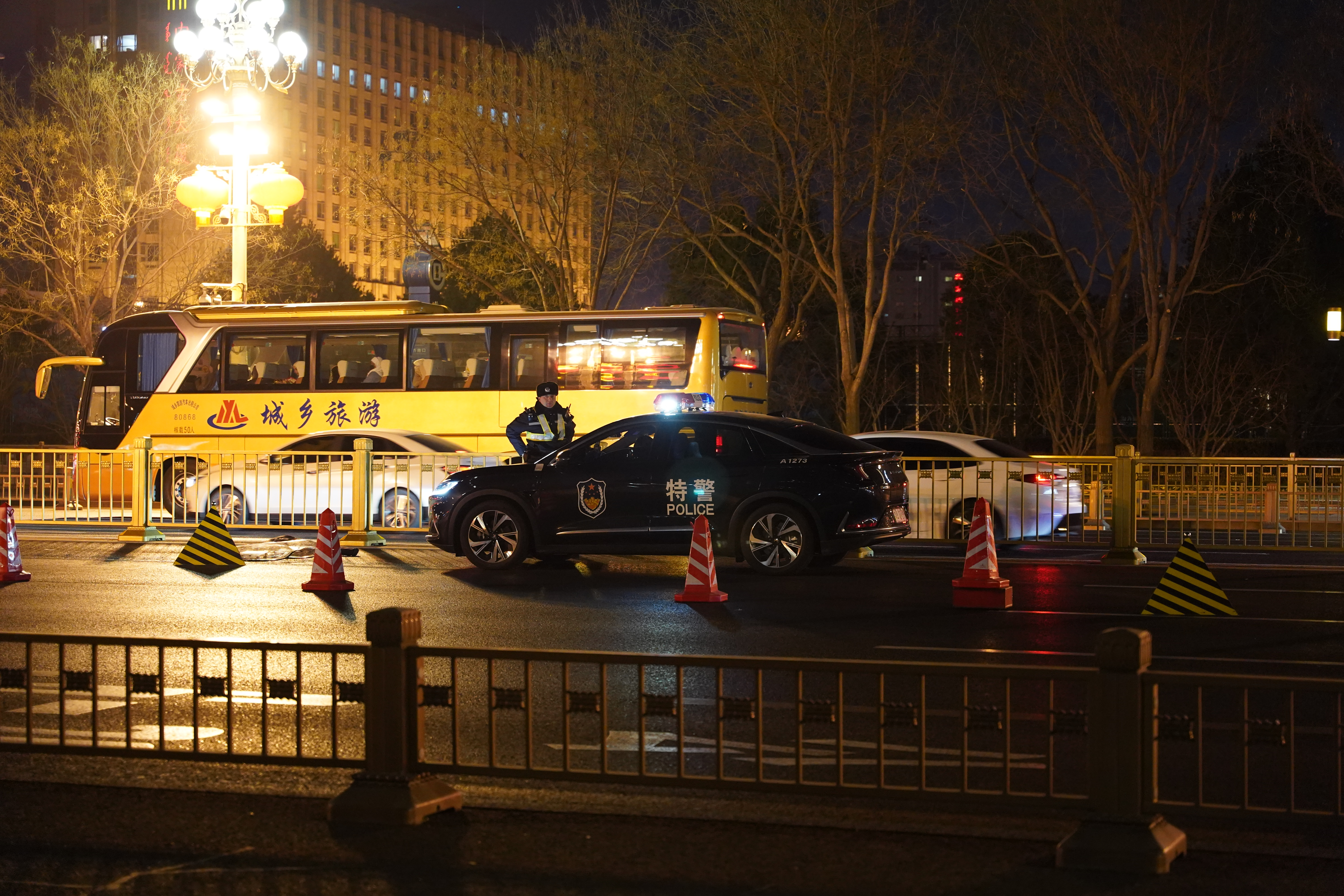
Beijing SWAT police car

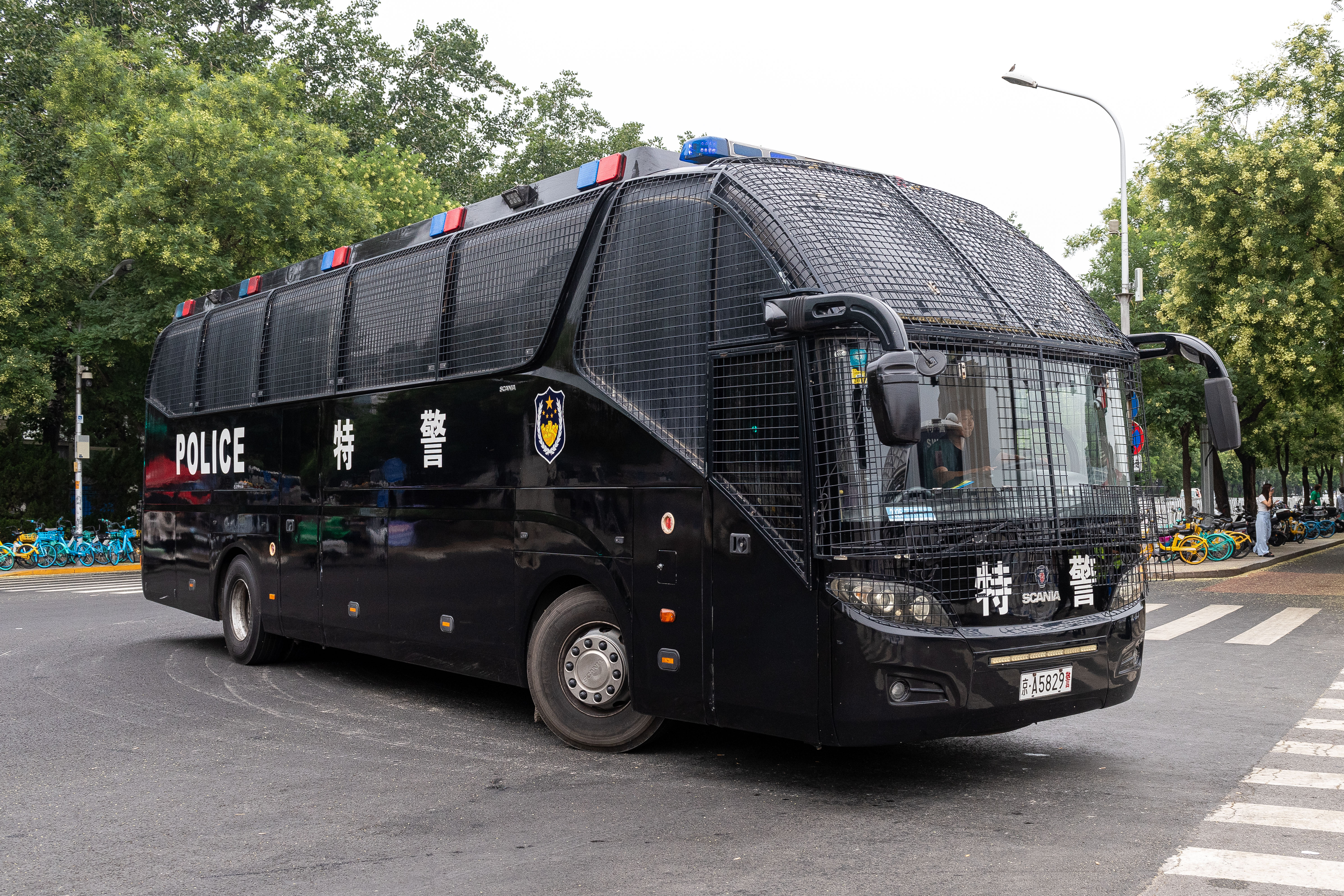
Beijing SWAT police bus

In preparation for the 2008 Summer Olympics, the local government allocated CNY 280 million for the Beijing SWAT to procure equipment for operations, some of which went into purchasing specialized vehicles for various duties including the Hummer H2 and APC's.

== See also ==
- Snow Leopard Commando Unit
- SWAT#China
