= SLCU =

SLCU can refer to:

- Snow Leopard Commando Unit, a special police unit in China
- School of Law, Christ University in India
- Sainsbury Laboratory University of Cambridge in the United Kingdom
