= Police bus =

Bus used by police for various purposes

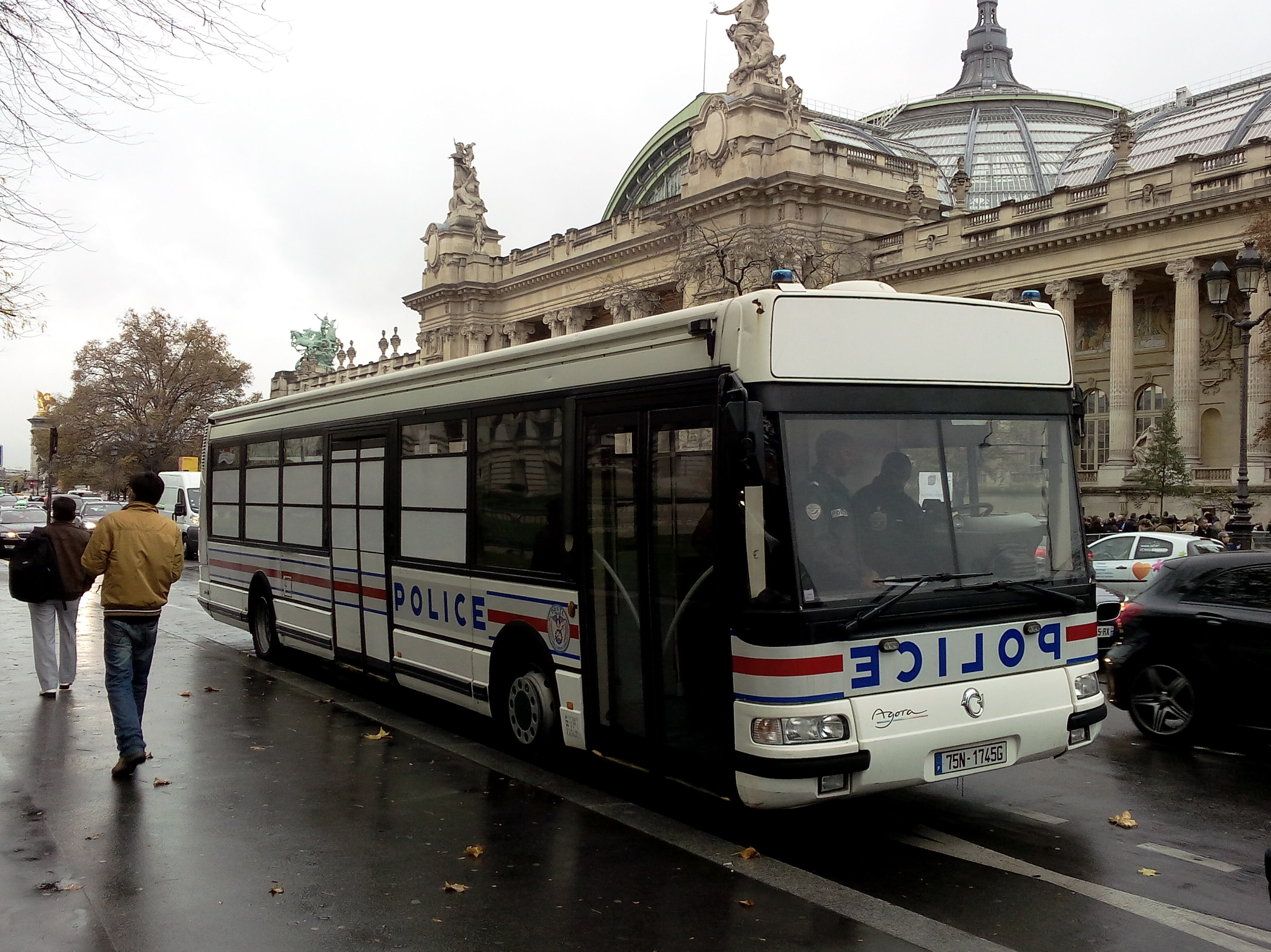
Irisbus Agora used by the French National Police

A police bus is a bus, minibus, or coach used by police. They are often denoted by the livery and equipment fitted to the vehicle, and generally do not serve any public transport function. Police buses may be ordinary buses with minor or no modifications, or they may have some degree of protection for riot control use, or they may be armoured buses.

The type of bus used by a police force generally varies, but the vast majority are single-deck buses in either conventional or cab-over designs. If used for transporting personnel, they will simply be seated, but many are converted by a bus manufacturer, coachbuilder, or other specialist company to serve more specific purposes.

== Uses ==
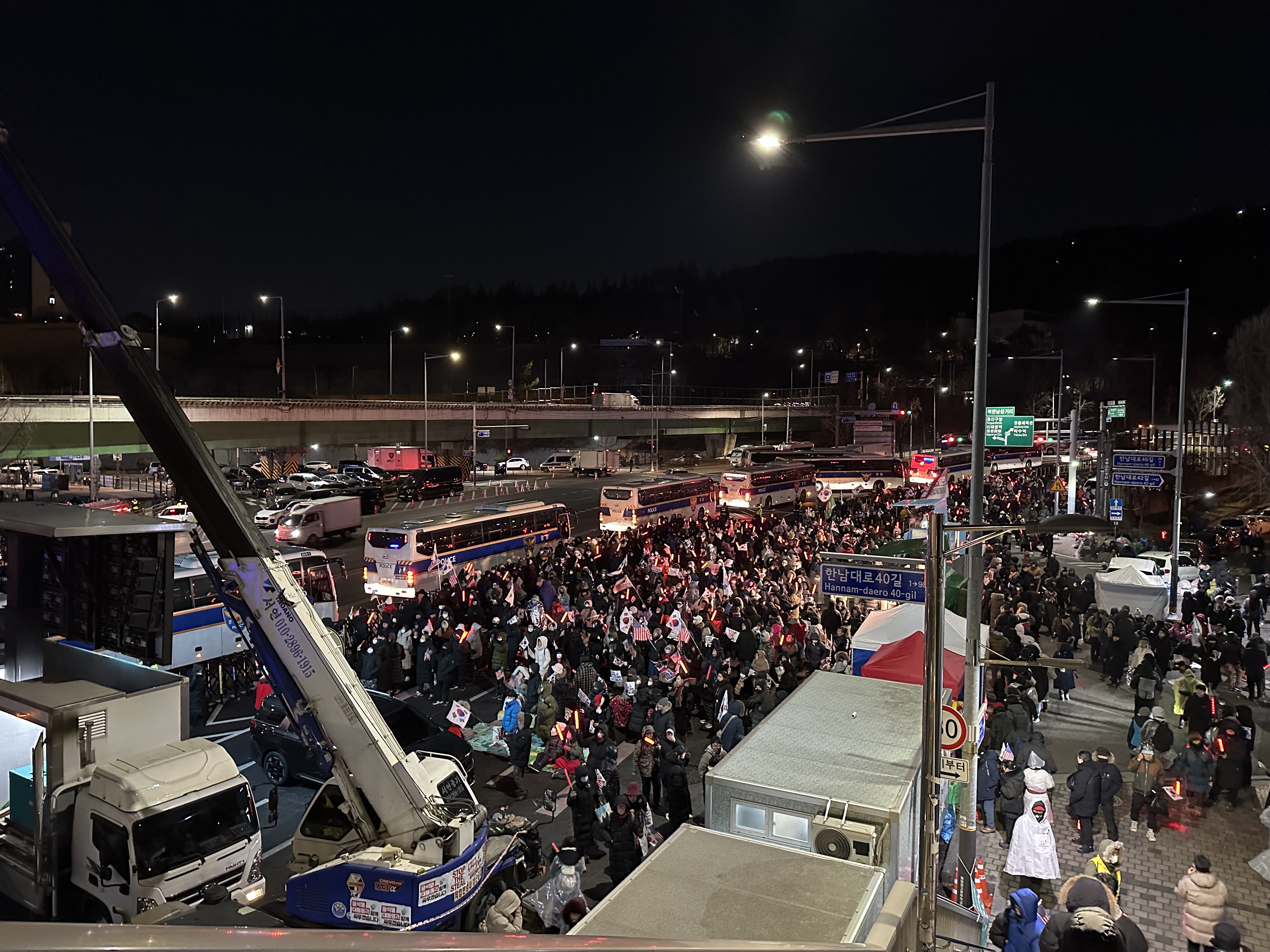
South Korean National Police Agency buses forming a crowd control barrier during protests concerning the arrest of Yoon Suk Yeol

Buses are used by police forces for transporting large numbers of officers to a needed area, such as for crowd control at events and demonstrations, or to facilitate large scale deployments for more serious riot control. Buses can also form barricades to block access. These may be hired vehicles, or vehicles retained by the police force for the purpose.

Police buses are often deployed as mobile command centers, mobile police stations, or temporary holding and processing areas. They may also serve as prisoner transport vehicles, such as the MCI D4000 ISTV, a dedicated prisoner transport variant of an American coach. Other roles for converted police buses can include being used in public information or awareness campaigns, or as mobile recruitment displays.

== Gallery ==
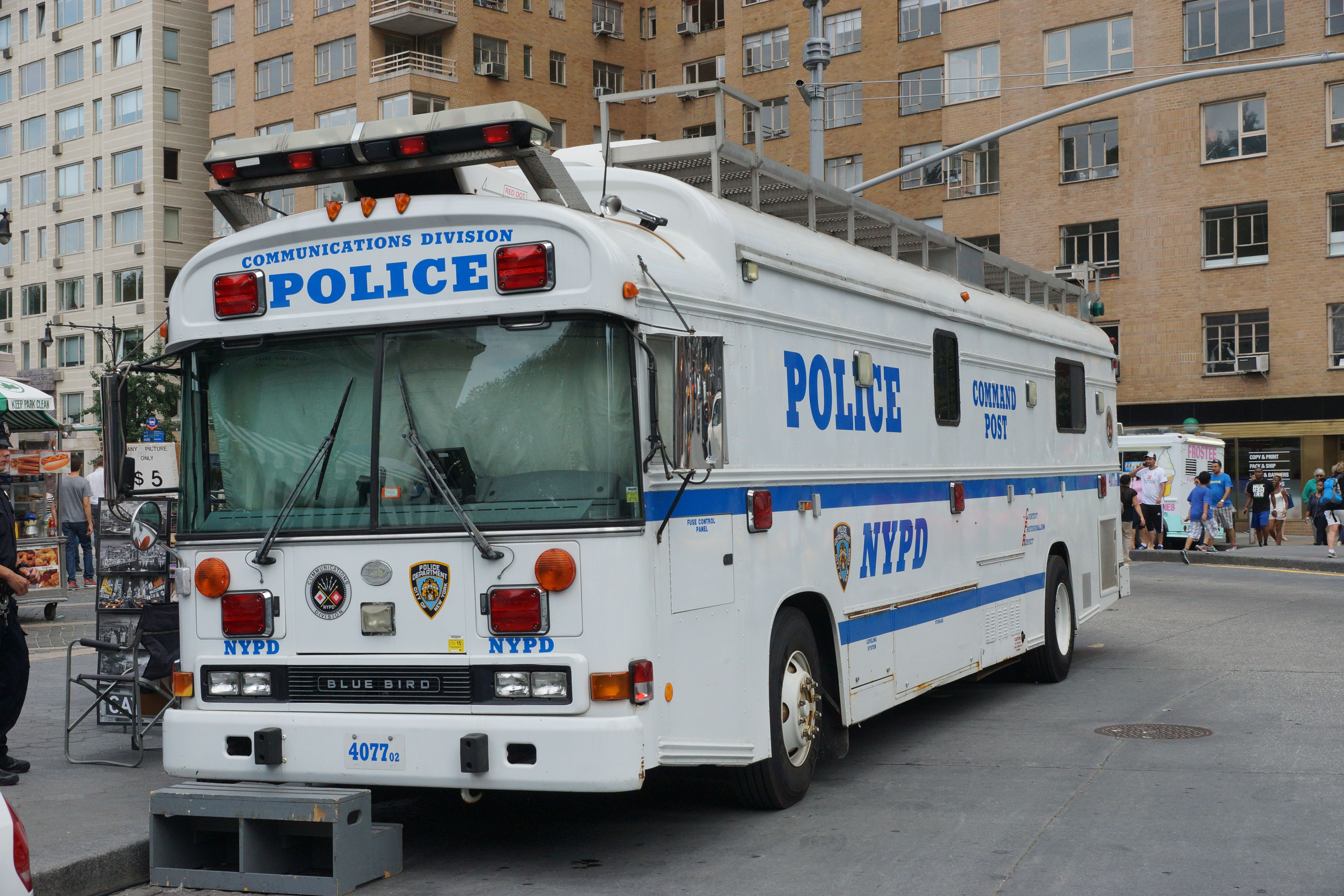
Bus used by the New York City Police Department as a mobile command center

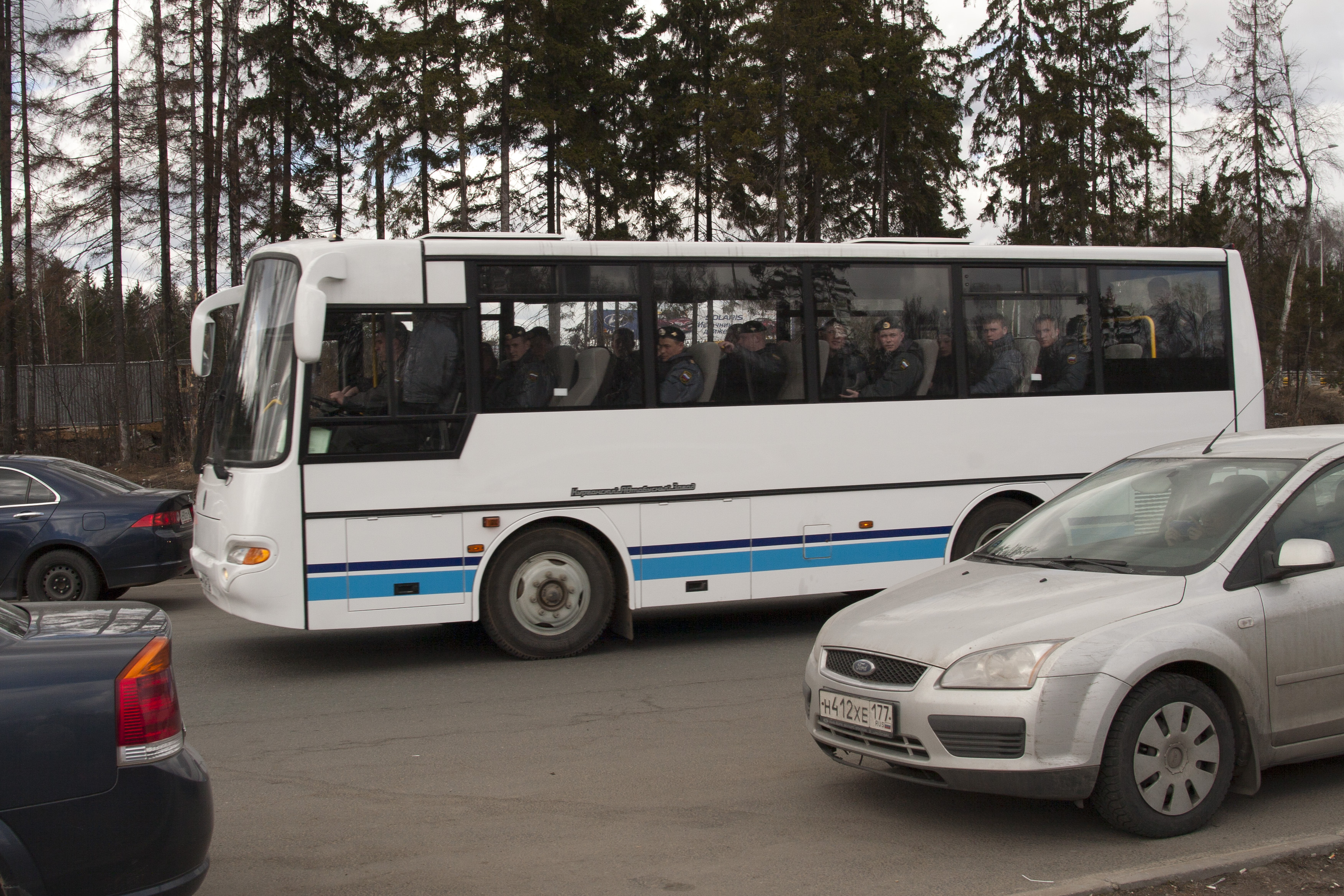
Bus used by the Police of Russia to transport personnel

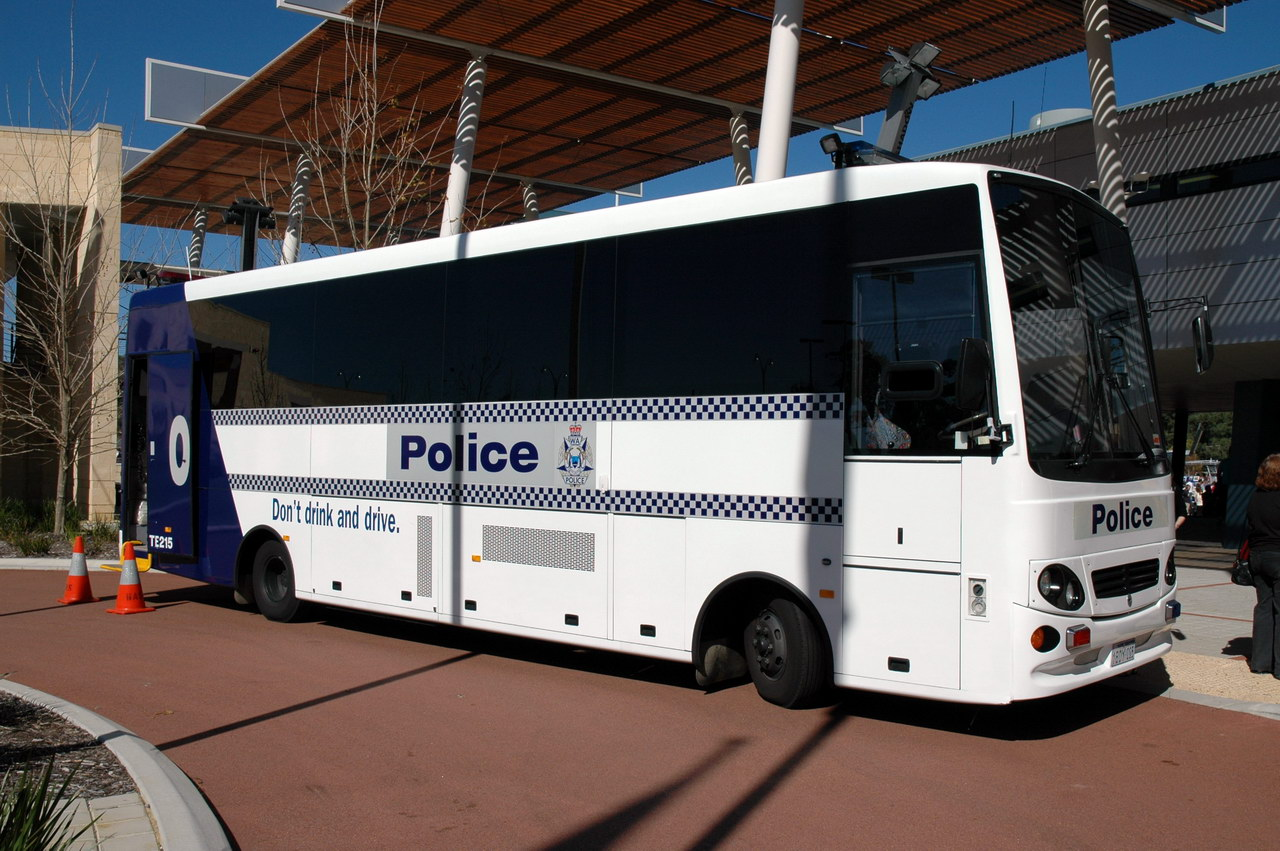
Bus used by the Western Australia Police Force as a "booze bus" to detain suspects arrested for drunk driving

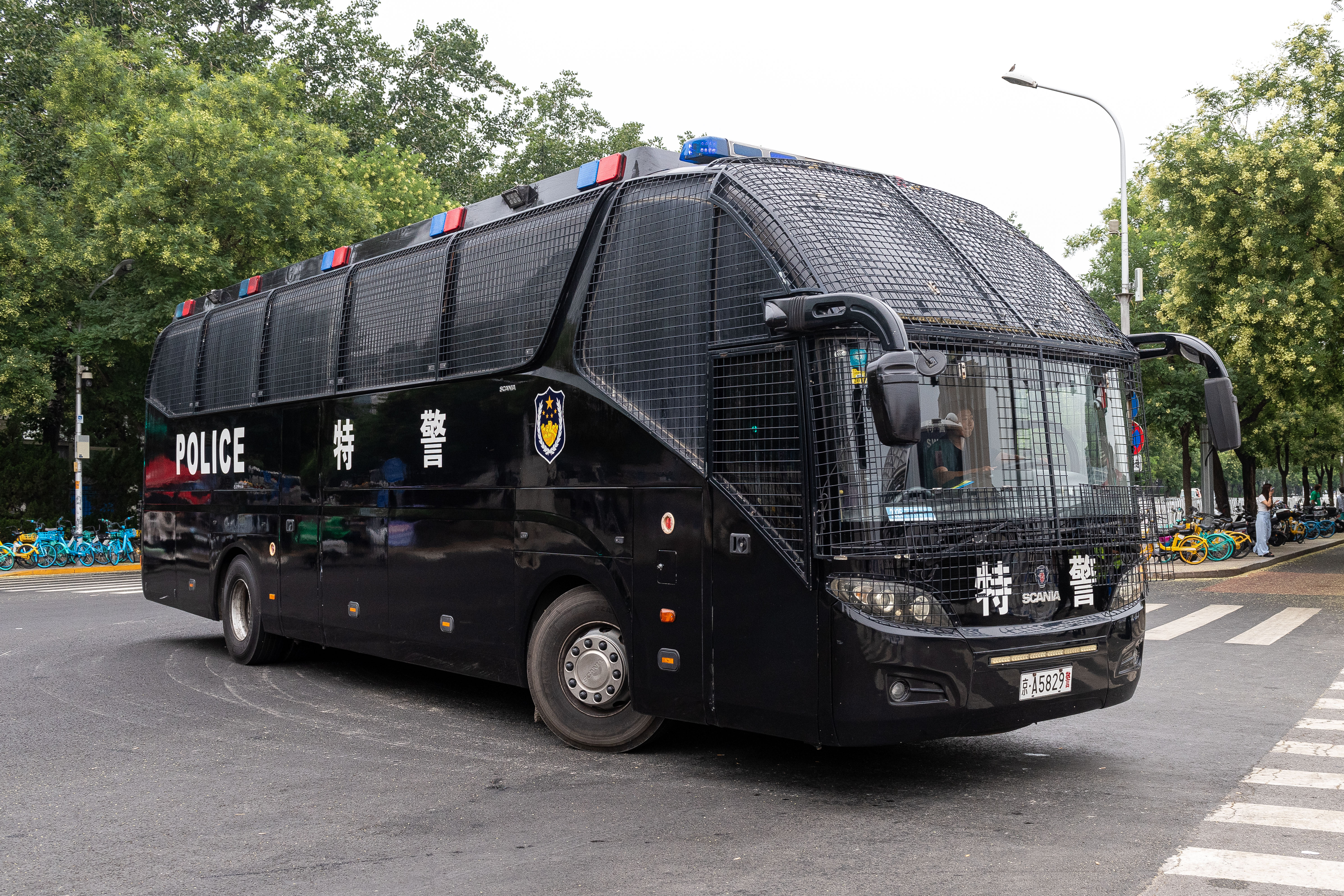
Bus used by the Beijing Municipal Public Security Bureau SWAT Unit as a police armored vehicle

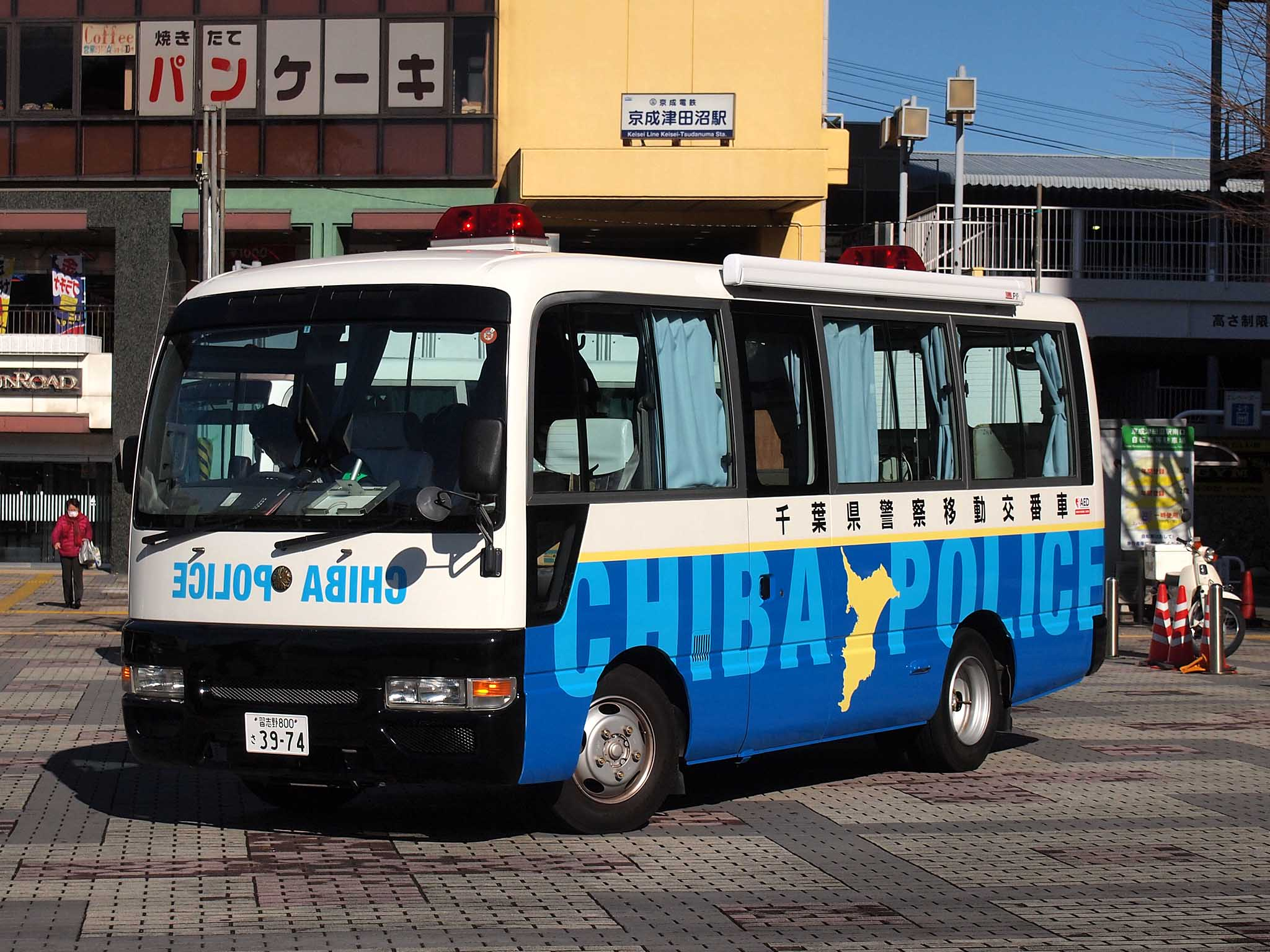
Minibus used by the Chiba Prefectural Police as a mobile kōban

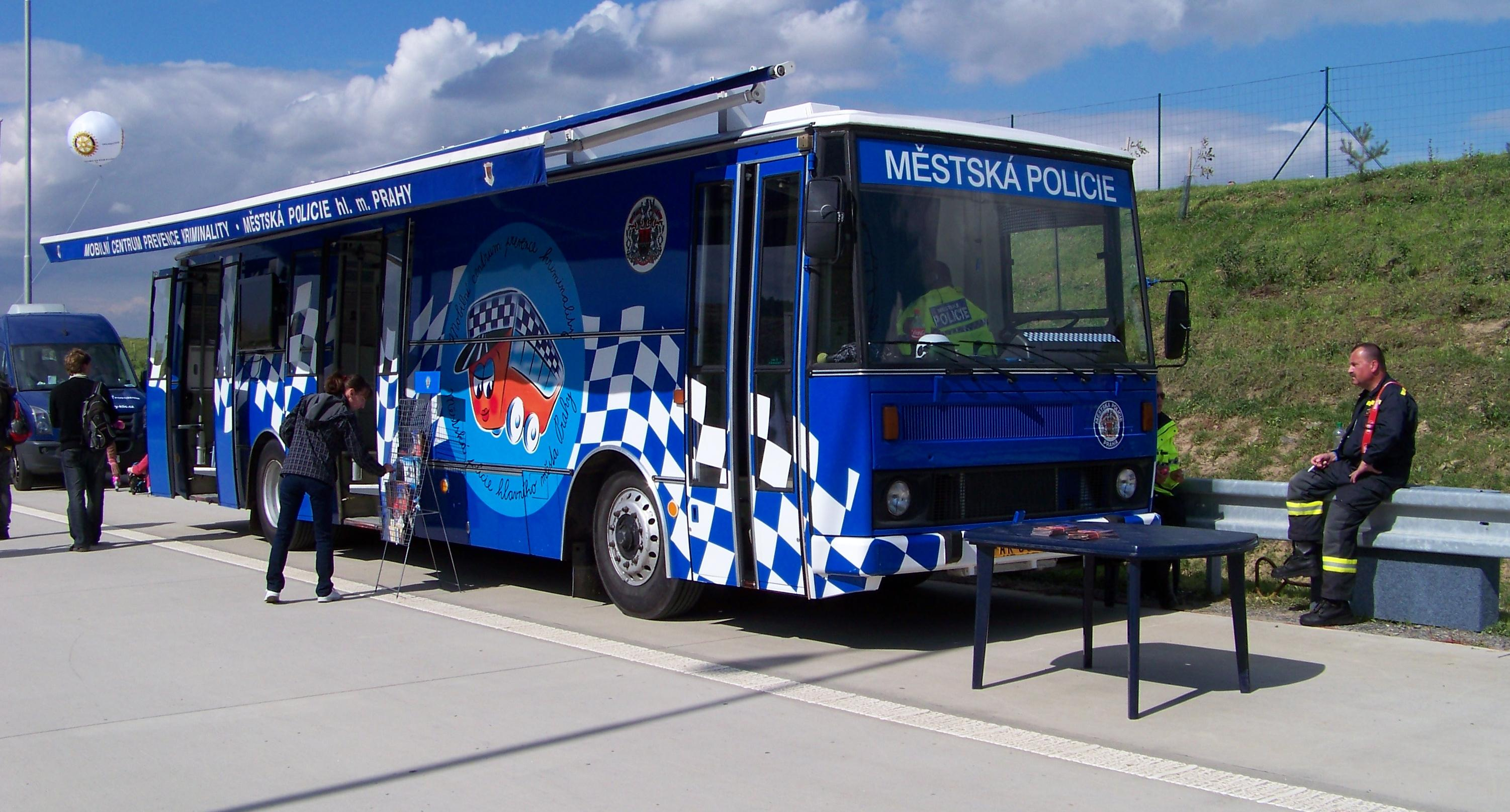
Bus used by the Prague Municipal Police for promotional purposes

== See also ==
- Police vehicle
  - Police van
- Ambulance bus
- Prison bus
- List of buses
