= Huang Guangyu =

Chinese businessman (born 1969)

Huang Guangyu 黄光裕 Cantonese: Wong Kwong Yu Teochew: Ng Kuang Yeo
- Born: Zeng Junlie (曾俊烈); 24 June 1969 (age 57); Shantou, Guangdong, China
- Other name: Huang Junlie (黄俊烈)
- Education: Renmin University of China
- Occupation: Entrepreneur
- Title: Chairman of GOME Group
- Term: 1987-18 January 2009
- Spouse: Du Juan
- Status: Released
- Conviction: Stock market manipulation (18 May 2010)
- Penalty: 14 years in prison $600,000,000 fine Confiscation of $200,000,000

Huang Guangyu (simplified Chinese: 黄光裕; traditional Chinese: 黃光裕; pinyin: Huáng Guāngyù; Jyutping: Wong4 Kwong1 Yu6) (born 24 June 1969) is a Chinese businessman and the former chairman of GOME Group, which is the largest consumer electronics retailer in China. He had a net worth of US$1.7 billion as of 2005, according to Forbes magazine's world's richest people ranking. In 2005, he was the richest man in China according to Time magazine. He was born and raised as a Christian.

In 2006, he was forced by regulations to sell off 25% of GOME Group, as listed in Hong Kong, making his net worth US$2.5 billion, according to some sources. His ambitious goals include "making Gome one of the 500 largest companies in the world by 2008". Huang was listed as the richest person in Mainland China in 2007, with a net worth estimated at $6.3 billion, according to the 2008 China Rich List by Hurun. He was surpassed by Yang Huiyan in 2009, with a net worth of $7.1 billion.

== Stock market manipulation ==
On November 24, 2008, the Hong Kong Stock Exchange indefinitely halted trading shares of GOME, amid reports of a police investigation of Huang Guangyu, the company's Chairman, executive director and Controlling Shareholder. Furthermore, Huang was reported to be charged with alleged stock market manipulation, on which police declined to comment, according to the state-run China Daily newspaper. He resigned from the post of chairman on 16 January 2009.

=== Sentencing ===
In 2010, a Chinese court sentenced Huang Guangyu to 14 years in Beijing Municipal No. 2 Prison, a punishment that observers considered likely to be seen as a warning to the country's business executives.

=== Business behind bars ===
In April 2011, Chairman Chen Xiao, who succeeded Huang when he was sentenced to prison, resigned after a seven-month campaign by Huang to reassert control.

On July 12, 2011, Eagle Vantage Asset Management, controlled by Huang, bid on his behalf for the decommissioned British Royal Navy aircraft carrier, HMS Ark Royal. According to reports, the plan is to create the world's largest buoyant luxury shopping mall.

On June 24, 2020, Huang was released on probation from prison after his term was reduced by 22 months for good behaviour. His probation period ended on February 16, 2021.
