= Beijing Municipal Prison =

Municipal prison in Daxing District, Beijing

Coordinates: 39.72826526°N 116.3639023°E

Beijing Municipal Prison (simplified Chinese: 北京市监狱; traditional Chinese: 北京市監獄; pinyin: Běijīng Shì Jiānyù) is a prison in Daxing District, Beijing. Originally established by the Qing dynasty Board of Law on 31 March 1909, the present Daxing site was built in 1982 and the municipal prison officially moved there on 8 November 1994. It had 1600 prisoners in 2006. It is about one hour away from the centre of Beijing by car.

It is operated by the Beijing Municipal Administration of Prisons.

As of 2009 it houses almost 2,000 male inmates; these inmates are sentenced to 15 or more years, and criminals with special circumstances. It has 18 workshops including an auto manufacturing plant, a plastic packaging plant and a steel factory. It produces light steel, construction templates, paper products, automobile remodeling, spray paint, spray molding, clothing and toys. Inmates use metal cutting lathes, shears, bending machines, straight cutting machines, assembly machines, flange straightening machines, arc welding generators, sewing machines, and other equipment.

== See also ==
- List of prisons in Beijing municipality
