= Beijing Juvenile Offender Detachment =

Prison in Beijing, China

Beijing Juvenile Offender Detachment is a prison in the municipality of Beijing, China.

== See also ==
- List of prisons in Beijing municipality
