= Liangxiang Prison =

Prison in Beijing, China

Liangxiang Prison is a prison in Liangxiang, Fangshan District, Beijing, China. It was established in 1960. The prison was once the largest elevator factory in China. It currently houses over 1,000 adult male criminals with 10-15 yr. sentences.

== See also ==
- List of prisons in Beijing municipality
