= Snow Leopard Commando Unit =

Chinese elite police tactical unit

- 雪豹突击队 (Chinese)
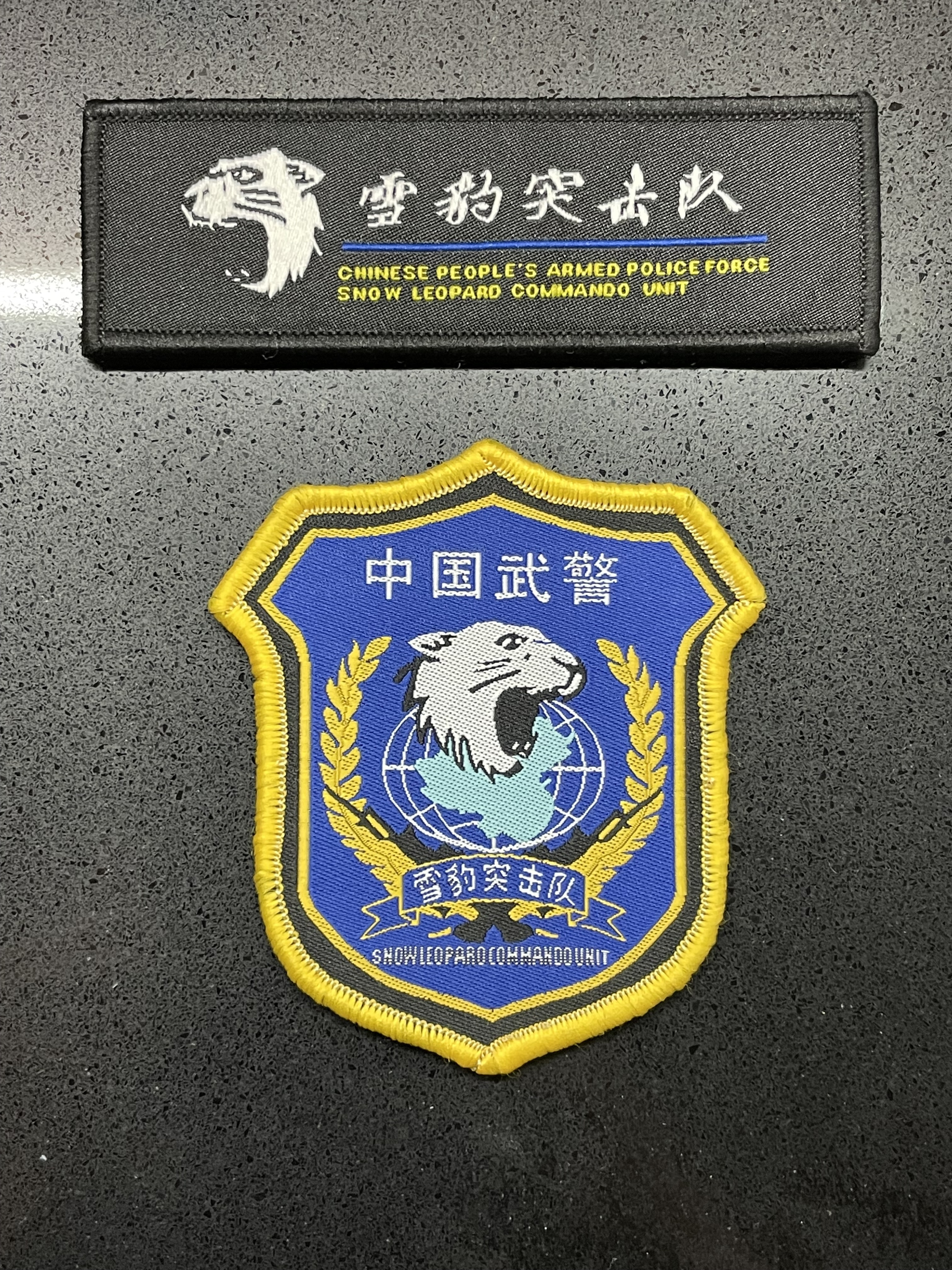
- Insignia of the SLCU
- Active: December 2002 (existence only revealed on 29 August 2006) – present
- Country: China
- Agency: People's Armed Police
- Type: Police tactical unit
- Role: Counter-terrorism; Law enforcement
- Operations jurisdiction: South China
- Part of: 2nd Mobile Corps
- Headquarters: Guangzhou, Guangdong Province
- Abbreviation: SLCU

Structure
- Officers: 400

Notables
- Significant operation(s): 2008 Summer Olympics security; Counter-terrorist operations in Xinjiang province; Diplomatic security in Afghanistan; Diplomatic security in Iraq

The Snow Leopard Commando Unit (SLCU, Simplified Chinese: 雪豹突击队), formerly known as the Snow Wolf Commando Unit (SWCU, Simplified Chinese: 雪狼突击队), is a People's Armed Police (PAP) tactical unit in the People's Republic of China.

== Namesake ==
The former "Snow Wolf" name was inspired by the ability of the Arctic wolf to survive and thrive under harsh conditions.

According to Qu Liangfeng, a senior PAP officer in charge of the daily operations of SLCU, the name change was "inspired by the story of a brave and cunning snow leopard, which escaped an ambush by a hunter and his eight hunting dogs."

Officially, the SLCU is the 1st Special Operations Detachment, 2nd Mobile Corps.

== History ==
The SWCU was secretly established in December 2002 and trained in secret for five years.

The SWCU and the Beijing SWAT unit were unveiled in a demonstration at the Beijing Police Academy on 27 April 2006 as part of a public relations effort to illustrate the capabilities of the PAP to deal with terrorism, the protection of delegates, and to enforce law and order in the 2008 Beijing Olympics.

The SWCU had participated in an anti-terrorist exercises with Russia on 4 September 2007 known as "Cooperation-2007."

On 13 November 2007, SWCU operators were involved in anti-terrorist exercise before foreign military VIPs.

The unit's name was changed in 2008 to the Snow Leopard Commando Unit.

In 2013 and 2014, the SLCU participated in the Annual Warrior Competition.

In 2018, the SLCU was moved from the Beijing Corps to the 2nd Mobile Corps.

== Duties ==
SLCU' tasks include counter-terrorism, hostage rescue, riot control, serving high-risk arrest and search warrants, anti-hijacking, anti-WMD terrorism, bomb disposal, counterinsurgency, crowd control, law enforcement tactics against crime, VBSS, and VIP protection.

== Training and selection ==
SLCU applicants must have one to two years of PAP service and undergo interviews, physical and psychological tests.

In 2006, the average age of SLCU officers was 22 years, with most entering at 18; the SLCU was among the youngest in the Chinese counter-terrorism community.

Candidates undergo physical training, driving lessons for various vehicles, and weapons training.

Physical training includes 200 push-ups, 200 sit-ups, 100 squats, lifting barbells 200 times and carrying a 35 kg load for a 10 km cross-country run.

== Organization ==
The SLCU consists of four companies assigned with very specific responsibilities:

Squadron	Duty
9th and 10th Companies	Counter-Terrorism
11th Companies	Obstacle Removal, Bomb Disposal, Anti-WMD Terrorism
12th Companies	Snipers

== Equipment ==
The unit has spent about CNY 2 million (approximately US$ 258,000) in domestically manufactured armored personnel carriers for riot control and has also imported CNY 4 million worth of American-manufactured vehicles and equipment.

Each SLCU operator is estimated to be outfitted with CNY 300,000 (approximately US$48,000) worth of equipment, including their body armor and communications equipment.

The SLCU is the first unit in the PAP to be equipped with the W-15 helmet, an improved version of the QGF11, in 2015.

=== Uniform ===
The SLCU is known to wear the Type 05 digital camouflage uniform issued by the PAP, although they are now using the Type 07 digital camouflage uniform.

In overseas operations, they have velcro patches with the Chinese flag and 'CHINA' on the patch, usually with the language of the region where they operate in.

=== Vehicles ===
- CSZ-181

=== Weapons ===
The currently known SLCU-used weapons are as follows:

Name	Country of origin	Type
QSZ-92	China	Semi-automatic pistol
QBS-09	China	Shotgun
JS 9 mm	China	Personal defense weapon
CS/LS6	China	Personal defense weapon
QCW-05	China	Personal defense weapon
QBZ-95B-1	China	Assault rifle
Norinco CQ	China	Assault rifle
QBS-06	China	Assault rifle
QBU-88	China	Sniper rifle
CS/LR4	China	Sniper rifle
QJY-88	China	Machine gun
CS/LM6	China	Machine gun
PF-89	China	Rocket launcher
QLU-11	China	Grenade launcher
QBB-95	China	Light machine gun

== Notable operations ==
The SLCU, along with Beijing Municipal Public Security Bureau's SWAT unit (under the Ministry of Public Security (MPS)), was tasked with many of the security responsibilities of the 2008 Summer Olympics.

SWCU operators have been deployed to Afghanistan and Iraq to protect Chinese diplomatic personnel.

In 2011, the SLCU was deployed to Xinjiang to support counter-terror police operations and provide security for the China-Eurasian Expo convention.
