= Annual Warrior Competition =

Combat competition in Jordan

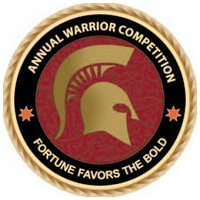
- "Fortune Favors the Bold"
- Venue: King Abdullah II Special Operations Training Centre (KASOTC)
- Location: Amman, Jordan
- Competitors: Special Operation Teams, Special Police Units, SWAT, Special Forces

The Annual Warrior Competition is a combat-oriented competition that pits special operations military and police teams against each other. Teams are assessed in events testing physical fitness, marksmanship drills, medical tasks and written exams. The competition takes place at the King Abdullah II Special Operations Training Centre (KASOTC) in Amman, Jordan. Jordan created the competition in May 2009.

== Background ==
The competition is hosted at the King Abdullah II Special Operations Training Centre, also known as KASOTC.

Every year the competition is redesigned to reflect the ever-changing threats posed by terrorism. Competing “Warriors” are expected to demonstrate competencies and adaptability of marksmanship, endurance, teamwork, tactics and communications on the battlefield. They are observed and judged by a panel of reputable international experts from various professional military and law enforcement backgrounds. Many international and local teams participate every year.

The 12th Annual Warrior Competition, which was scheduled to occur in 2020, was postponed and later held in 2022 due to the COVID-19 pandemic.

== Annual Warrior Competition (AWC) Results ==
| Competition | Year | Teams | Countries | Winning Country | Winning team Name |
|---|---|---|---|---|---|
| 14th AWC | 2025 | 38 | 23 | Iraq | Iraqi Counter Terrorism Service - Iraqi Armed Forces |
| 13th AWC | 2024 | 30 | 19 | Brunei | Rejimen Pasukan Khas - Royal Brunei Armed Forces |
| 12th AWC | 2022 | 40 | 26 | Jordan | Royal Guards - Jordanian Armed Forces (Team 1) |
| 11th AWC | 2019 | 46 | 26 | Brunei | Rejimen Pasukan Khas - Royal Brunei Armed Forces (Team 1) |
| 10th AWC | 2018 | 40 | 24 | Lebanon | Black Panthers - Internal Security Forces |
| 9th AWC | 2017 | 33 | 17 | China | Sky Sword Unit - People's Armed Police |
| 8th AWC | 2016 | 27 | 11 | Lebanon | Black Panthers - Internal Security Forces (Team 2) |
| 7th AWC | 2015 | 37 | 18 | Russia | SOBR "Terek" - Rosgvardiya (Team 1) |
| 6th AWC | 2014 | 33 | 19 | China | Snow Leopard Commando Unit - People's Armed Police |
| 5th AWC | 2013 | 30 | 17 | China | Snow Leopard Commando Unit - People's Armed Police |
| 4th AWC | 2012 | 35 | 18 | Germany | GSG9 – Federal Police |
| 3rd AWC | 2011 | 22 | 12 | Austria | Einsatzkommando Cobra - Ministry of the Interior |
| 2nd AWC | 2010 | 10 | 4 | United States | 24th Marine Expeditionary Unit - United States Marine Corps Force Reconnaissance |
| 1st AWC | 2009 | 7 | 2 | Jordan | General Intelligence Directorate |
