= Beijing Women's Prison =

Women's prison in Beijing, China

Beijing Women's Prison (simplified Chinese: 北京市女子监狱; traditional Chinese: 北京市女子監獄; pinyin: Běijīng Shì Nǚzǐ Jiānyù) is a prison in Daxing District, Beijing, China. It was established in 1999.

It is operated by the Beijing Municipal Administration of Prisons.

It is home to nearly 1,000 female prisoners in Beijing and is Beijing's only prison for female criminals. They produce 23,564 prison uniforms per/year and also make school uniforms, knits, sweaters, toys, etc.

== See also ==
- List of prisons in Beijing municipality
