= King Abdullah II Special Operations Training Centre =

Military training center in Jordan

KASOTC
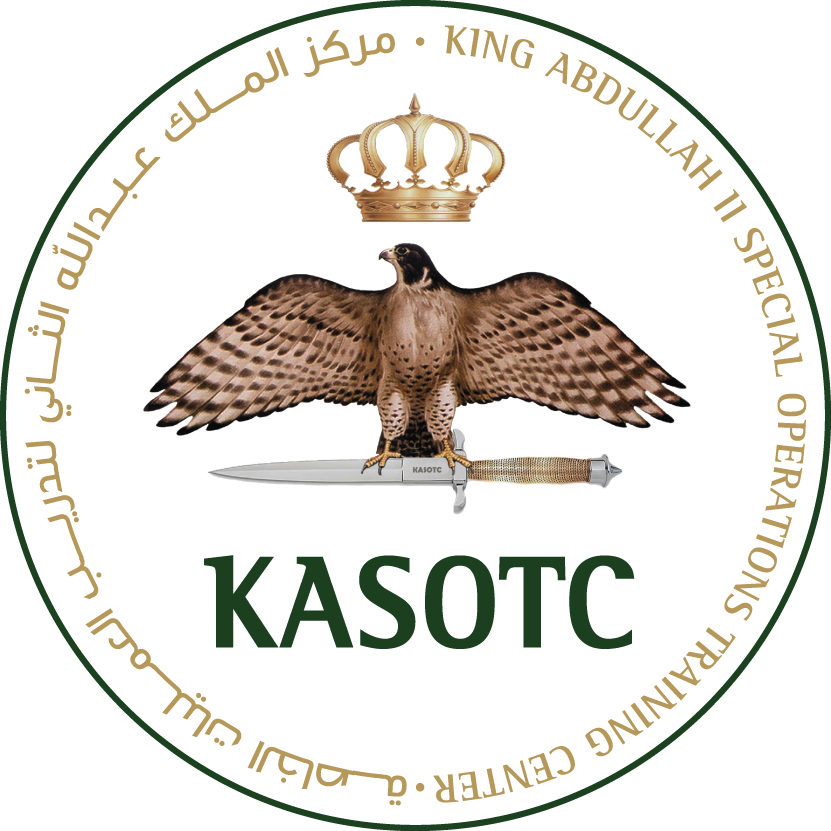

Organization overview
- Formed: May 19, 2009
- Headquarters: Amman, Jordan; 32.032°N 35.975°E
- Motto: "Where Advanced Training Meets Advanced Technology"
- Organization executive: Chief Executive Officer Col. Nael AlShqierat
- Parent Organization: Jordanian Armed Forces

The King Abdullah II Special Operations Training Center (KASOTC) is an installation located in Amman, Jordan that specializes in counter-terrorism, special operations and irregular warfare tactics, techniques and procedures. The base was built by a U.S. construction firm on land donated by the King of Jordan and paid for by the U.S. Defense Department Foreign Military Sales programme, part of the 2005 special appropriation. Management of the construction was undertaken by the United States Army Corps of Engineers.

By 2009, the center had been made operational. The center is managed by active and retired special forces personnel and training staff.

== Training ==
Some courses begin in the classroom, where trainees master abstract concepts and discuss creative solutions. Trainees then apply their knowledge and skill in a variety of field exercises; simulating real-world conditions including live-fire & maneuver. Performance is observed, measured, and evaluated using state-of-the-art feedback systems.

== Facilities ==
The Urban Area contains a wide range of urban and village facilities (56) to simulate realistic neighborhoods, including embassy, residential areas, commercial and industrial facilities, and government buildings; a public square; villas, apartment complexes, and servants quarters; community center, garage, gas station, and shops; light industrial areas; office complexes; and water reservoirs.

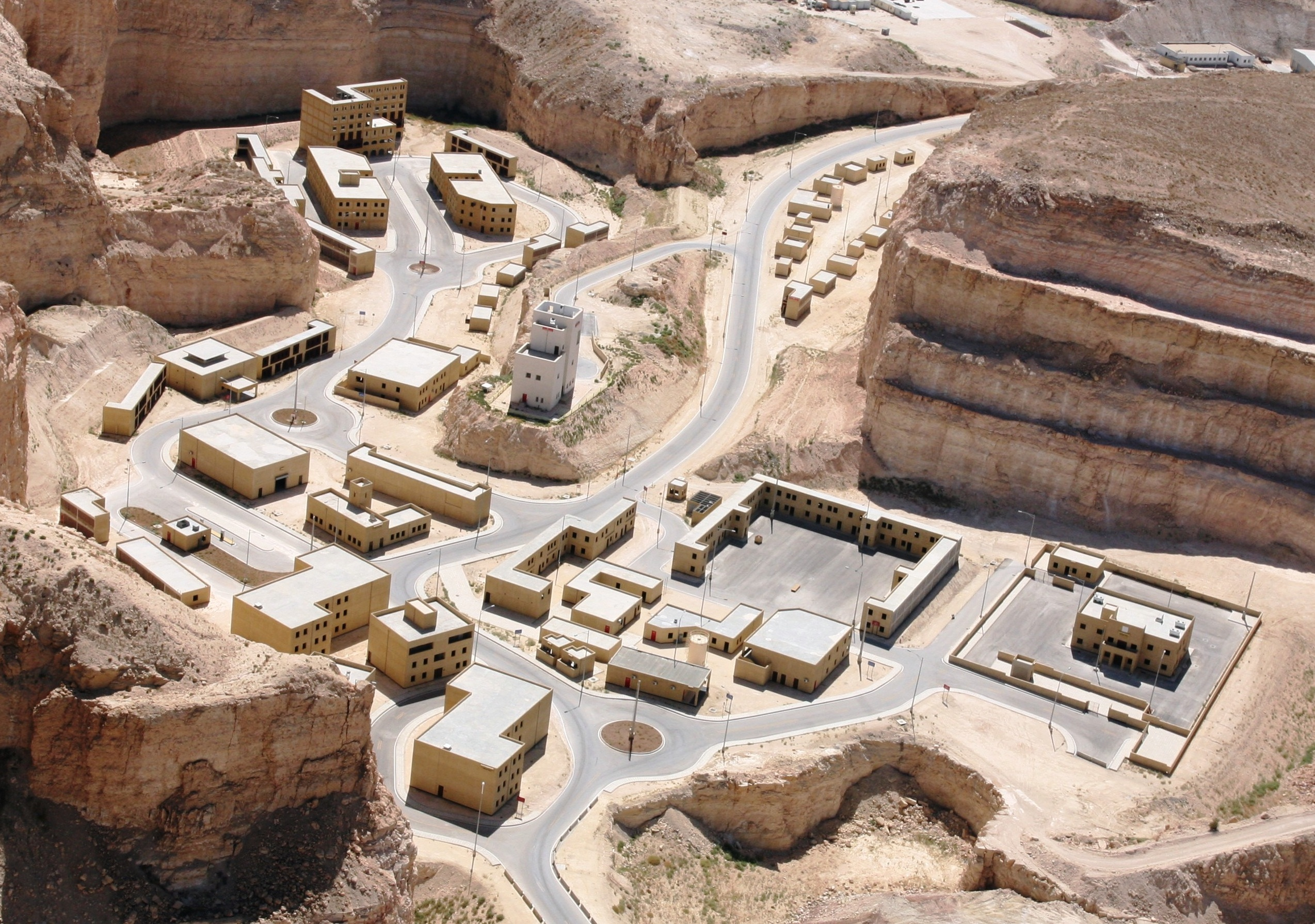
Urban Area

An Airbus 300 houses a full-scale A300 aircraft model and control tower with a helicopter landing pad. The A300 also includes some B777 aircraft features and includes initiating targets to stand up from their seats, introduction of smells/sounds of the battlefield and video/audio capture of all training inside and out.

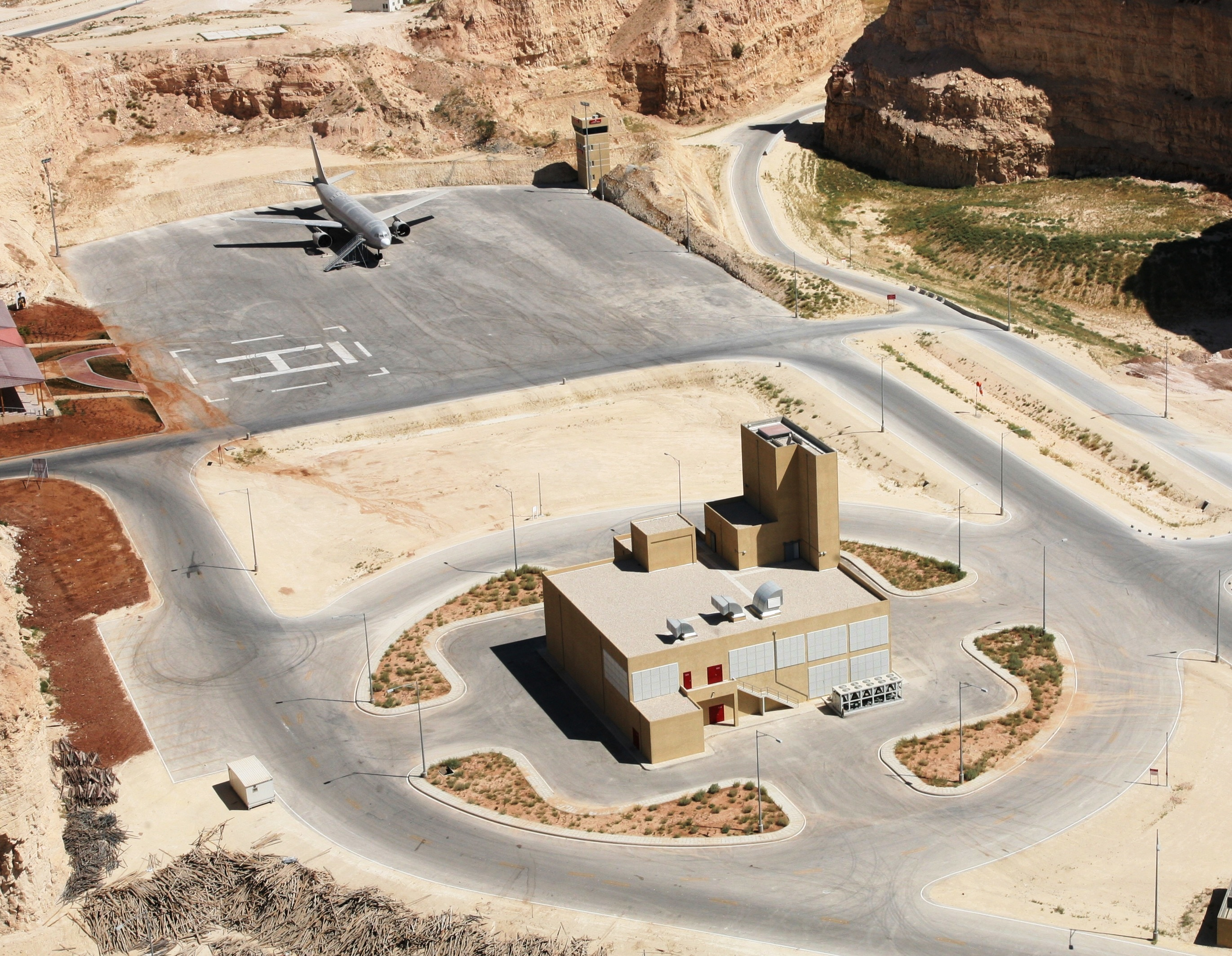
A300 and CQB

The close-quarters battle (CQB) house is a two-story armored facility with an adjoining three-story tower that provides room-to-room combat practice using live fire. Designed to train for assaults on a major stronghold using a variety of methods including simultaneous foot, vehicle and helicopter approaches. Assaults can be conducted using entry techniques on multiple levels including assaults through multiple floors and rooms.

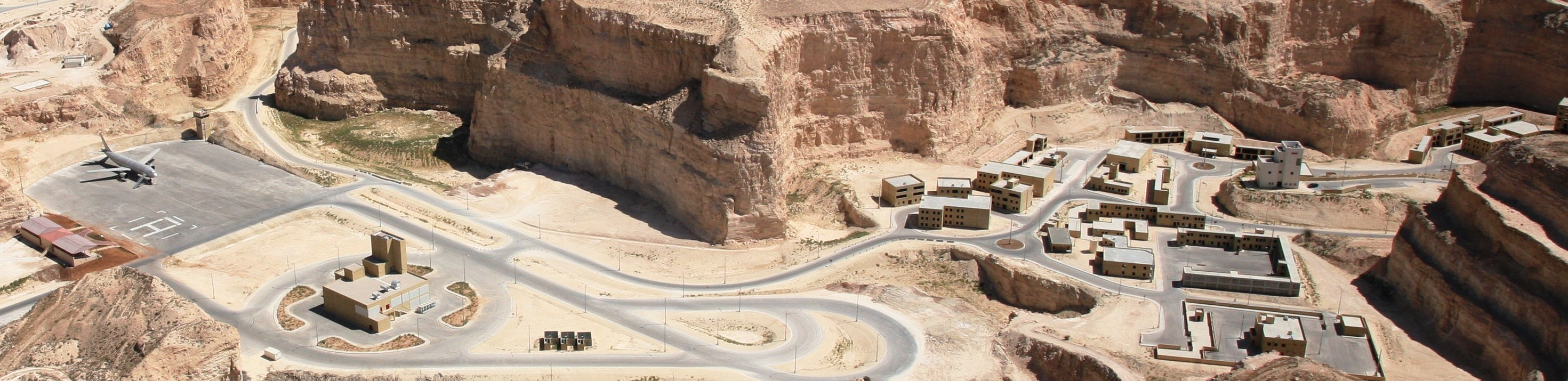
KASOTC facilities that utilize battlefield effects

All the aforementioned facilities takes full advantage of the battlefield effects controlled by the Range Operations Control Center that are audio/video captured using 350 cameras that are fixed through the training areas; the cameras vary between day/night and indoor/outdoor. This capability provides for two purposes, firstly it can be used for the training officer to direct the troops on the ground remotely from the control center, and for the After Action Review (AAR) exercise in which the performance is observed, measured, and evaluated with the trainees.

The Method of Entry (MOE) facility is a suite of facilities to allow the tactical training of method of entry techniques. The facilities contained in this area include various breaching stations, steel cutting station, the Method Of Entry Building and a space for construction to meet client's specific request (mud walls, etc.). The MOE building is a two-story structure used to train forces in methods of entry techniques.

The 8 story Commando Tower is also a platform for wall climbing, fast roping and rappelling.

The electronic shooting ranges have provide for Moving Target Engagement and Falling Plates, Grouping and Zeroing, and Weapon Testing.

Through a joint venture with American Company IPC, KASOTC opened the Falcon4 Simulation Center of Excellence. Falcon4 provides a complete integrated training system progressing from classroom and constructive simulations, to a diagnostic station, simulation and to live fire with moving robotic targets.

The Driver Track enables Non-Emergency Vehicle Operations (NEVO) to safely instruct and practice non-conventional driving techniques, such as evasive maneuvering, high-speed turn negotiation, skid control, and vehicular pursuit. The range is designed to allow travel in both directions, so that a trainee can practice making turns and maneuvers in opposite directions. Vehicles and maintenance provided on-site.

== The Annual Warrior Competition ==
The Annual Warrior Competition is an annual combat-oriented competition that is based on physical ability, team work, communication and individual accuracy which takes place at the King Abdullah II Special Operations Training Center KASOTC in Amman, Jordan. KASOTC created the competition in May 2009.
