= Beijing Municipal No. 1 Prison =

Prison in Beijing, China

Beijing No. 1 Prison
- Location within Beijing Beijing Municipal No. 1 Prison (China)
- Location: Chaoyang District, Beijing; 39.8562°N 116.5565°E
- Status: Operational
- Managed by: Beijing Municipal Administration of Prisons

Beijing Municipal No. 1 Prison
- Simplified Chinese: 北京第一看守所
Transcriptions

Beijing Municipal No. 1 Prison or No. 1 Detention Center (Chinese: 北京市第一看守所) is a prison in eastern Beijing, China, operated by the Beijing Municipal Public Security Bureau. The facility is located in Dougezhuang township, Chaoyang District, in proximity to Beijing Capital International Airport.

== Notable inmates ==
Zang Tianshuo (Chinese: 臧天朔) - Rock star. In November 2009, the Second People's Court of Beijing opened a trial and pronounced that Zang Tianshuo was convicted of aggravating and was sentenced to six years in prison. Prior to this, Zang Tianshuo had been detained in the Beijing No. 1 Detention Center.

Pu Zhiqiang (Chinese: 浦志强) - Human rights lawyer.

Xu Caihong (Chinese: 徐彩虹) - Human rights defender.

Guo Jingyi - CCP senior inspector. In 2010, Guo Jingyi, the former inspector of the Department of Treaty and Law of the Ministry of Commerce, was imprisoned in the Beijing No. 1 Detention Center on suspicion of accepting bribes. He was later tried in the No. 2 Intermediate Court of Beijing.

== See also ==
- List of prisons in Beijing
