= Fangzhuang station =

Beijing Subway station

Fangzhuang 方庄
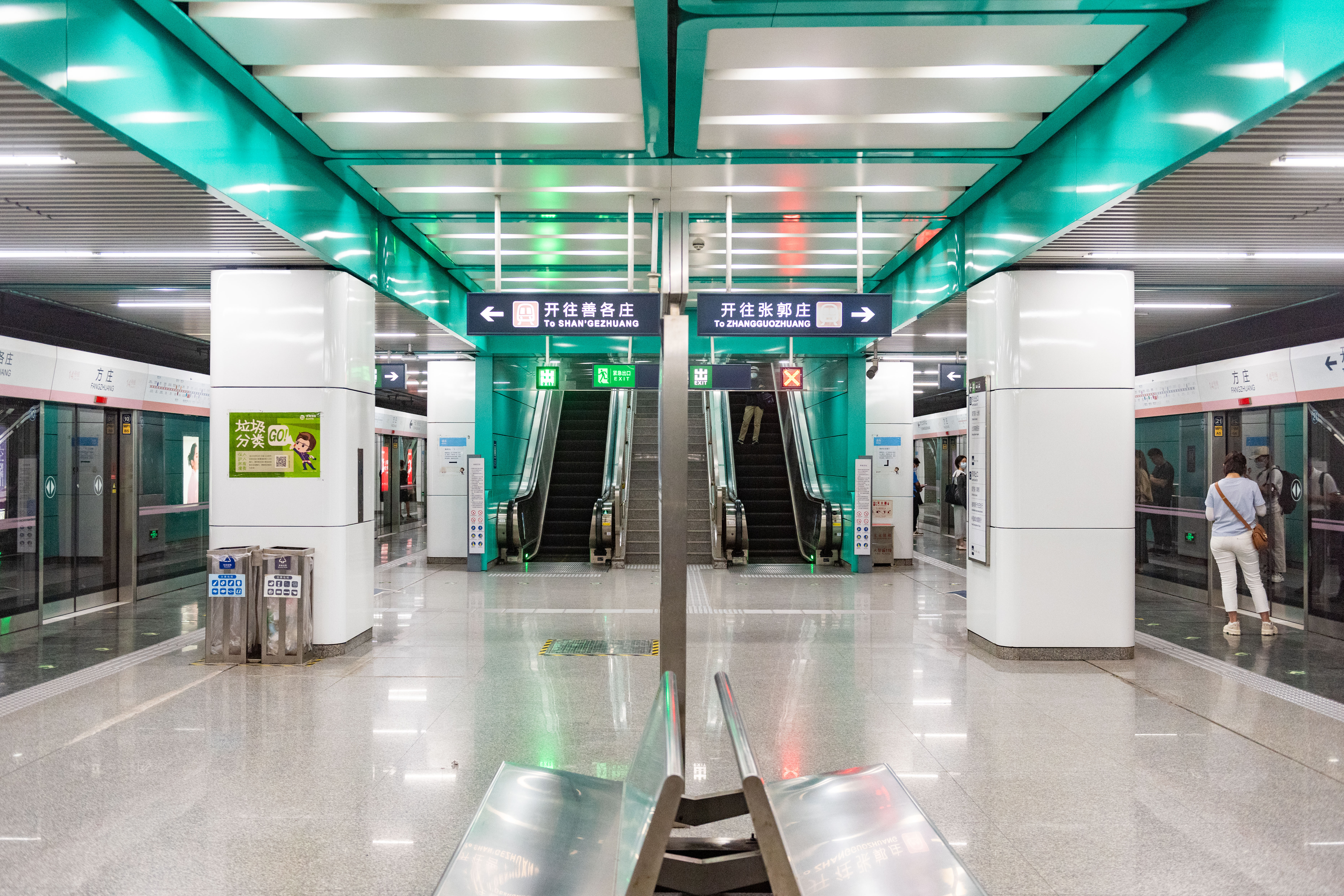
- Platform

General information
- Location: Zifang Road (紫芳路) and Fangzhuang Road (方庄路); Fangzhuang, Fengtai District, Beijing; China
- Coordinates: 39°51′57″N 116°26′25″E
- Operator: Beijing MTR Corporation Limited
- Line: Line 14
- Platforms: 2 (1 island platform)
- Tracks: 2

Construction
- Structure type: Underground
- Accessible: Yes

History
- Opened: December 26, 2015

Services
Preceding station	Beijing Subway	Following station
Puhuangyu towards Zhangguozhuang	Line 14	Shilihe towards Shangezhuang
Location
- Location within Beijing

Fangzhuang Station (simplified Chinese: 方庄站; traditional Chinese: 方莊站; pinyin: Fāngzhuāng Zhàn) is a station on Line 14 of the Beijing Subway. It was opened on December 26, 2015, and is located in the Fangzhuang Subdistrict of Fengtai District.

== Station layout ==
The station has an underground island platform.

== Exits ==
There are 3 exits, lettered A, B, and C. Exit A is accessible.
