= Beijing People's Police College =

Coordinates: 40.2496°N 116.1726°E

- 北京警察学院
- Former name: Public Security Bureau Public School
- Motto: 砺志、尚武、博学、精训
- Type: Police university
- Established: 1949; 77 years ago
- Location: Beijing, China

Chinese name
- Simplified Chinese: 北京警察学院
- Traditional Chinese: 北京警察學院
Transcriptions
Standard Mandarin
- Hanyu Pinyin: Běijīng jǐngchá xuéyuàn

Beijing People's Police College (BJPC) is a public university in Beijing, China.

The BJPC is a consolidated police training center, and the campus of the Capital Police for the greater Beijing area. The current location became a campus in September 2003. It is located in the Changping District of northwest Beijing, close to the Ming Tombs and the Badaling Great Wall.

The campus, covering an approximately two kilometer area, has a "large crime scene simulation area, including simulated residential neighborhoods, stores, and banks". Additionally, the campus has DNA laboratories, lecture areas, and training facilities. It is the largest police college and training center in Asia.

To join the BJPC, recruits have to pass the national college entrance examination and pass the physical check and fitness test. The recruits need to be Beijing residents. Every year among thousands of the applicants, only around 600 are recruited. Male applicants are favored. For instance, a class of 40 students has only 6 women.

It is also the BPSB's training center. It provides some short courses for special training.

== History ==
A Public Security Bureau Public School was first established in 1949. In 1966, it was closed along with many other educational institutions during the Cultural Revolution. In 1981, the school was reopened as the Beijing People's Police School (BPPS). Three years later, in 1984, the institution started to offer bachelor's degrees, and then became the Beijing People's Police College (BJPC).

Since 1984, and as of 2003, the institution has graduated approximately 40,000 people in police training programs, and 83,000 people with law enforcement degrees. In 2003, 7,411 people were registered as undergraduates, including 1,200 training for police certification, 794 receiving continuing police education, and 5,417 government employees were registered in certification programs (1,799) or bachelor's degree programs (3,618) in law enforcement.

As of 2023, the BJPC has held training programs for police officers from at least 20 other countries.
