= Beijing Municipal Administration of Prisons =

Prison operating agency in Beijing, China

The Beijing Municipal Administration of Prisons (simplified Chinese: 北京市监狱管理局; traditional Chinese: 北京市監獄管理局; pinyin: Běijīng Shì Jiānyù Guǎnlǐ Jú) is an agency of the direct-controlled municipality of Beijing, operating prisons.

In 2024, the Beijing Municipal Administration of Prisons operated 501 vehicles and had a budget of 4.4 billion RMB.

It is a part of the Beijing Municipal Bureau of Justice.

== Directors ==
- Tian Jinghua - 1912–1914 - The first director of the bureau
- Wang Wenbao - 1914–1926 - He had been trained in Tokyo

== Prisons ==
- Beijing Municipal No. 1 Prison
- Beijing Municipal Prison
- Beijing Municipal No. 2 Prison
- Beijing Women's Prison

== See also ==
- Beijing Municipal Public Security Bureau
- Beijing State Security Bureau
