= GOME Retail Holdings Ltd. =

Hong Kong electrical retailer

- Type: Joint Stock. Private
- Industry: Electrical appliance retailing
- Founded: 1987
- Founder: Huang Guangyu
- Headquarters: Hong Kong, People's Republic of China
- Area served: People's Republic of China; Hong Kong
- Key people: Da Zhong Zhang (Chairman); Jun Zhou Wang (CEO)
- Products: electrical goods consumer electronics
- Services: 56
- Revenue: ▼HKD 67.449 billion (2019); US$8.662 billion
- Net income: ▲HKD −2.937 billion (2019)
- Total assets: ▲HKD 80.396 billion (2019)
- Total equity: ▼HKD 12.976 billion (2019)
- Number of employees: 34,001 (2019)
- Website: http://www.gome.com.hk

GOME Retail Holdings Ltd. is one of the largest privately owned electrical appliance retailers in mainland China and Hong Kong. Its former name was GOME Electrical Appliances Holding Ltd. It was founded by Huang Guangyu, a Chinese businessman, in Beijing in 1987. Its brand name "GOME" was first adopted in 1993. Since 1999, it has developed outside Beijing and established retail outlets in other Chinese cities. It was listed on the Hong Kong Stock Exchange in 2004. As of 2008 Wong was the chairperson, the controlling shareholder, and the director. The company is incorporated in Bermuda.

== History ==
As of 2010 there were a total of 826 stores, 572 traditional stores, 13 digital stores and 2 flagship stores throughout mainland China.

In November 2008 the Hong Kong Stock Exchange indefinitely halted trading of the company shares after police revealed that Wong was under investigation for stock manipulation. He resigned from company chairman on 16 January 2009.

In November 2010, the company reported third quarter 2010 net profit of 477.5 million yuan, an increase of 24 per cent from the same period in 2009, despite a public dispute between founder Wong and chairman Chen Xiao over business strategy.

In January 2013, it was announced that Gome badged retail stores in Hong Kong would begin to close from March 2013, the six stores concerned were owned directly by Wong and not the listed company. The move marks a shift in emphasis for the company from one based on overseas expansion to one based on an increasing presence online and in second tier Chinese cities, although the company will remain in Hong Kong as a wholesaler.
