= Fangzhuang Subdistrict =

Fangzhuang Subdistrict 方庄街道
- Subdistrict
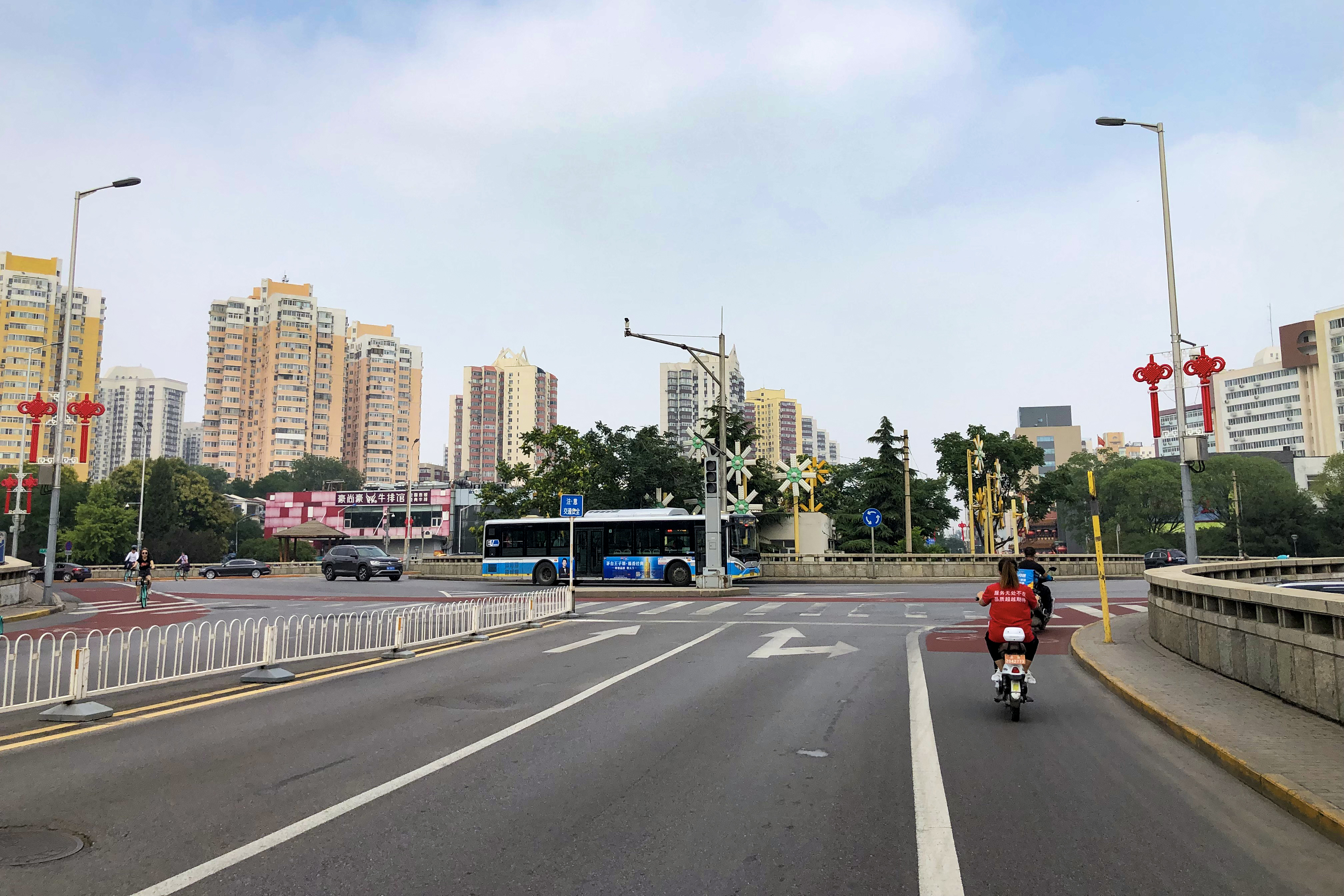
- Roundabout in Fangzhuang Subdistrict, 2021

- Location within Beijing Location within China
- Coordinates: 39°51′33″N 116°25′10″E
- Country: China
- Municipality: Beijing
- District: Fengtai
- Village-level Divisions: 17 communities

Area
  - Total: 3.22 km^{2} (1.24 sq mi)

Population (2020)
  - Total: 74,999
  - Density: 23,300/km^{2} (60,300/sq mi)
- Time zone: UTC+8 (China Standard)
- Postal code: 100061
- Area code: 010

Fangzhuang Subdistrict (Chinese: 方庄街道; pinyin: Fāngzhuāng Jiēdào) is a subdistrict and residential area in northern Fengtai District. It is bounded to the north and south by the 2nd and 3rd Ring Roads, and to the west and east by Tiantan Dong Lu and Fangzhuang Dong Lu. As of 2020, it has a population of 74,999.

The subdistrict got its current name Fangzhuang (Chinese: 方庄; lit. 'Fang Villa') due to its historical origin as an estate of Fang family.

== History ==
In 1951, three villages of this area (Puzhuang, Huangtukeng and Yushu) merged to form the Puhuangyu Township. In 1958, it was incorporated into People's Commune of Nanyuan as Puhuangyu Production Team. Farmers left the region in 1984 as new residential areas were being constructed.

Fangzhuang was developed in 1985, and was the first "modernized" residential area of Beijing. In 2021, it lost its status as an area.

== Administrative Divisions ==
As of 2023, there are 17 communities within Fangzhuang Subdistrict:

Administrative Division Code	Subdivision Name	Transliteration
110106013001	芳古园一区第一	Fangguyuan Yiqu Diyi
110106013002	芳古园一区第二	Fangguyuan Yiqu Di'er
110106013003	芳古园二区	Fangguyuan Erqu
110106013004	芳城园一区第二	Fangchengyuan Yiqudier
110106013005	芳城园二区	Fangchengyuan Erqu
110106013006	芳城园三区	Fangchengyuan Sanqu
110106013007	芳群园一区	Fangqunyuan Yiqu
110106013008	芳群园二区	Fangqunyuan Erqu
110106013009	芳群园三区	Fangqunyuan Sanqu
110106013010	芳群园四区	Fangqunyuan Siqu
110106013011	芳星园一区	Fangxingyuan Yiqu
110106013012	芳星园二区	Fangxingyuan Erqu
110106013013	芳星园三区	Fangxingyuan Sanqu
110106013014	芳城东里	Fangcheng Dongli
110106013015	紫芳园	Zifangyuan
110106013016	紫芳园南里	Zifangyuan Nanli
110106013017	芳城园一区第一	Fangchengyuan Yiqudiyi

== Landscape ==
Fangzhuang features dense concentrations of high rise apartments, along with several primary and secondary schools, hospitals, a courthouse and the Fangzhuang Sports Park.

Fangzhuang is divided into four neighborhoods: 芳古园 (Fangguyuan), 芳城园 (Fangchengyuan), 芳群园 (Fangqunyuan), 芳星园 (Fangxingyuan). The second character of each neighborhood name, taken together, spells 古城群星, which means the "stars of the ancient city." Historically, Fangzhuang was well known as an area where the affluent of southern Beijing lived (南城富人区).

Fangzhuang is home to the Ezone Sk8 Park.

== Transport ==
Fangzhuang is served by Fangzhuang station (Line 14), Puhuangyu station (Lines 5 and 14), and by many city bus routes.
