= Beijing Municipal Public Security Bureau =

Beijing Municipal Public Security Bureau 北京市公安局
- Abbreviation: Beijing PSB

Agency overview
- Employees: 51,000

Jurisdictional structure
- Operations jurisdiction: Beijing, China
- Beijing
- Primary governing body: Ministry of Public Security Central Political and Legal Affairs Commission
- Secondary governing body: Beijing Municipal People's Government
- General nature: Local civilian police

Operational structure
- Agency executive: Qi Yanjun, Bureau Chief
- Child agency: Beijing State Security Bureau (Co-Located within Same Building)

Website
- gaj.beijing.gov.cn

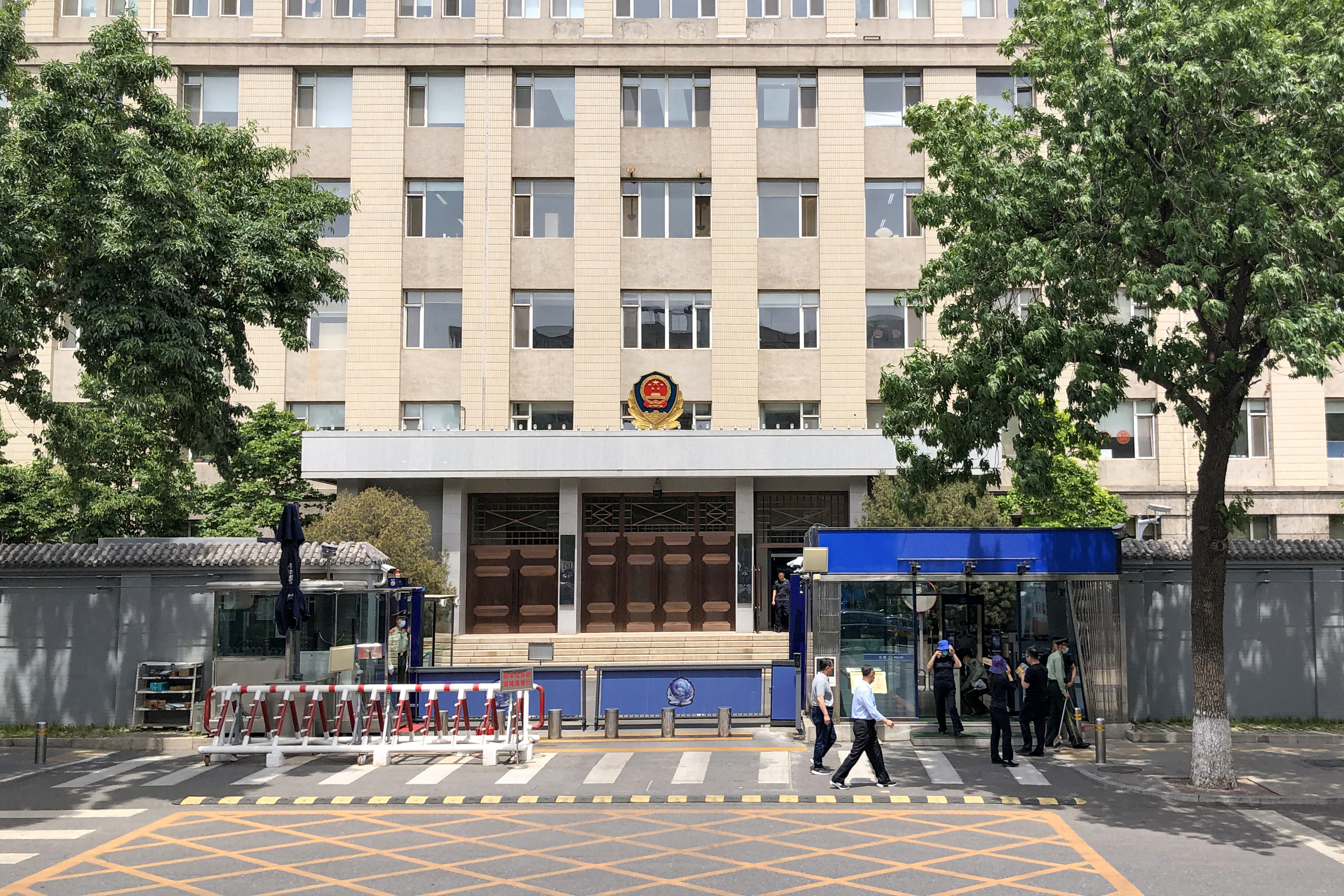
Headquarters of the Beijing PSB

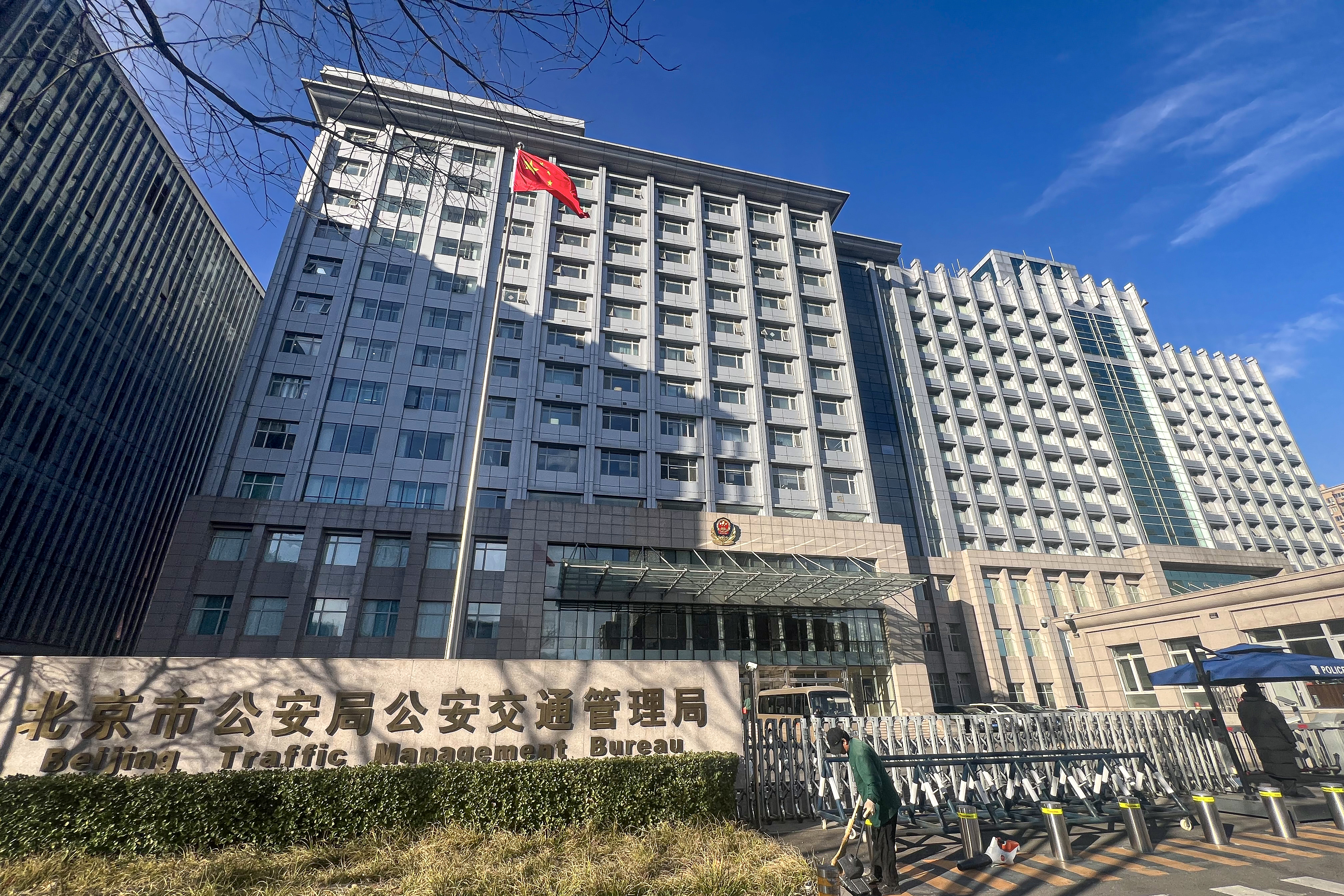
Beijing Traffic Management Bureau under the BJMPB

The Beijing Municipal Public Security Bureau (Chinese: 北京市公安局; pinyin: Běijīng Shì Gōng'ānjú) is a department of the Beijing Municipal People's Government. It serves as the city's public security bureau and branch of the people's police under the Ministry of Public Security (MPS). The headquarters is in Qianmen, Dongcheng District.

The bureau is the host of the Beijing SWAT, reportedly one of the most well trained and best equipped special police (特警; Tèjǐng) teams in the entire country. The director of the Beijing Public Security Bureau generally serves concurrently as a Vice Minister of Public Security.

== History ==
In 2010, the agency started a new public relations program by allowing Hong Kong and Macau media to attend press conferences and adding new spokespersons.

== Aircraft accidents ==
On 17 August 2011, a Beijing Municipal Public Security Bureau AW109E police helicopter crashed into Miyun reservoir in Miyun District, Beijing during a search and rescue training exercise. Four crewmen were killed in the accident.

== Equipment ==
=== Firearms ===
All police officers of the Beijing police are armed with a variety of guns on the beat, e.g. QSZ-92, QSW-06, officers in special units carry shotguns and SWAT members are armed with the domestically produced Norinco QBZ-95 Assault Rifle and QSZ-92 Pistols.

=== Vehicles ===
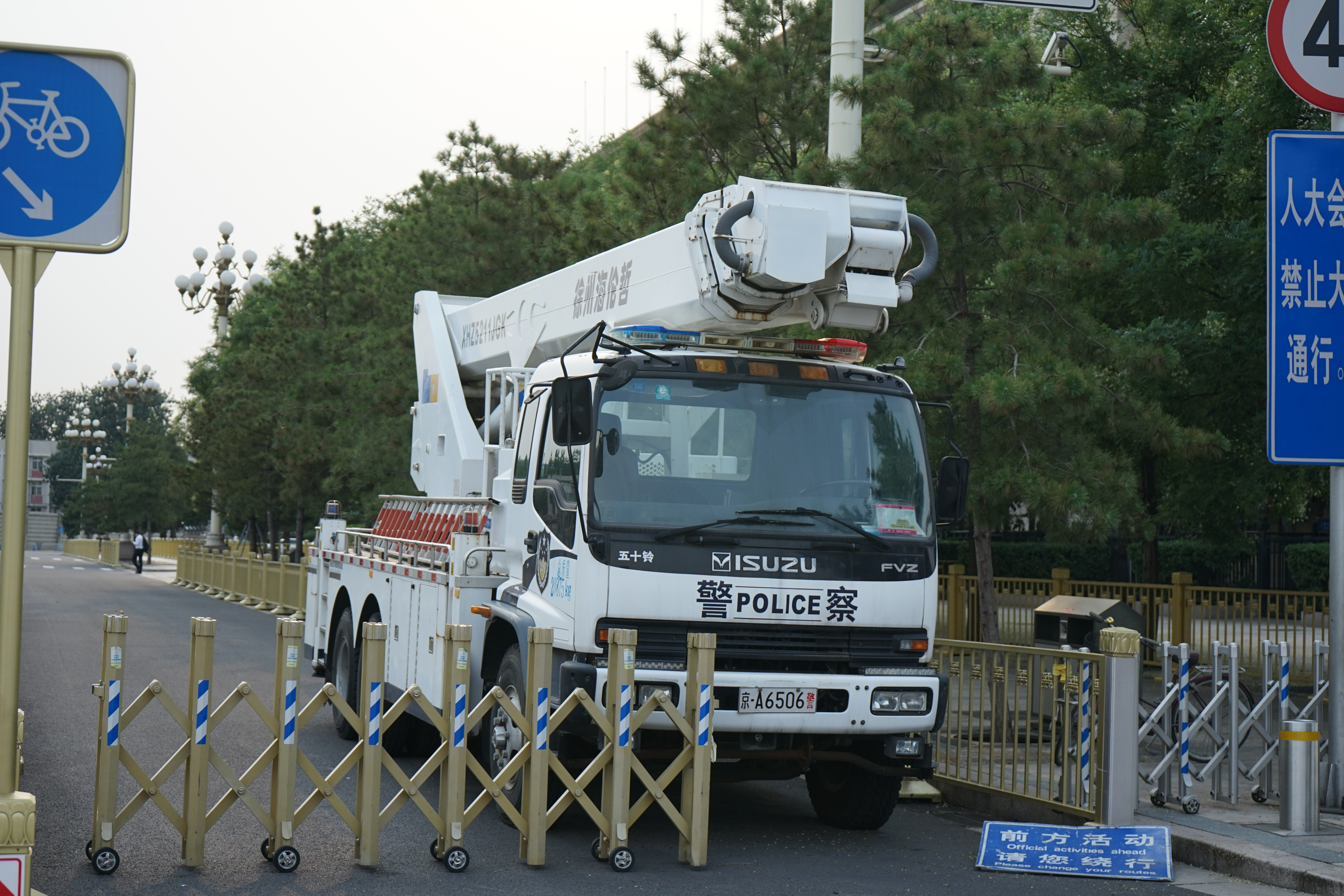

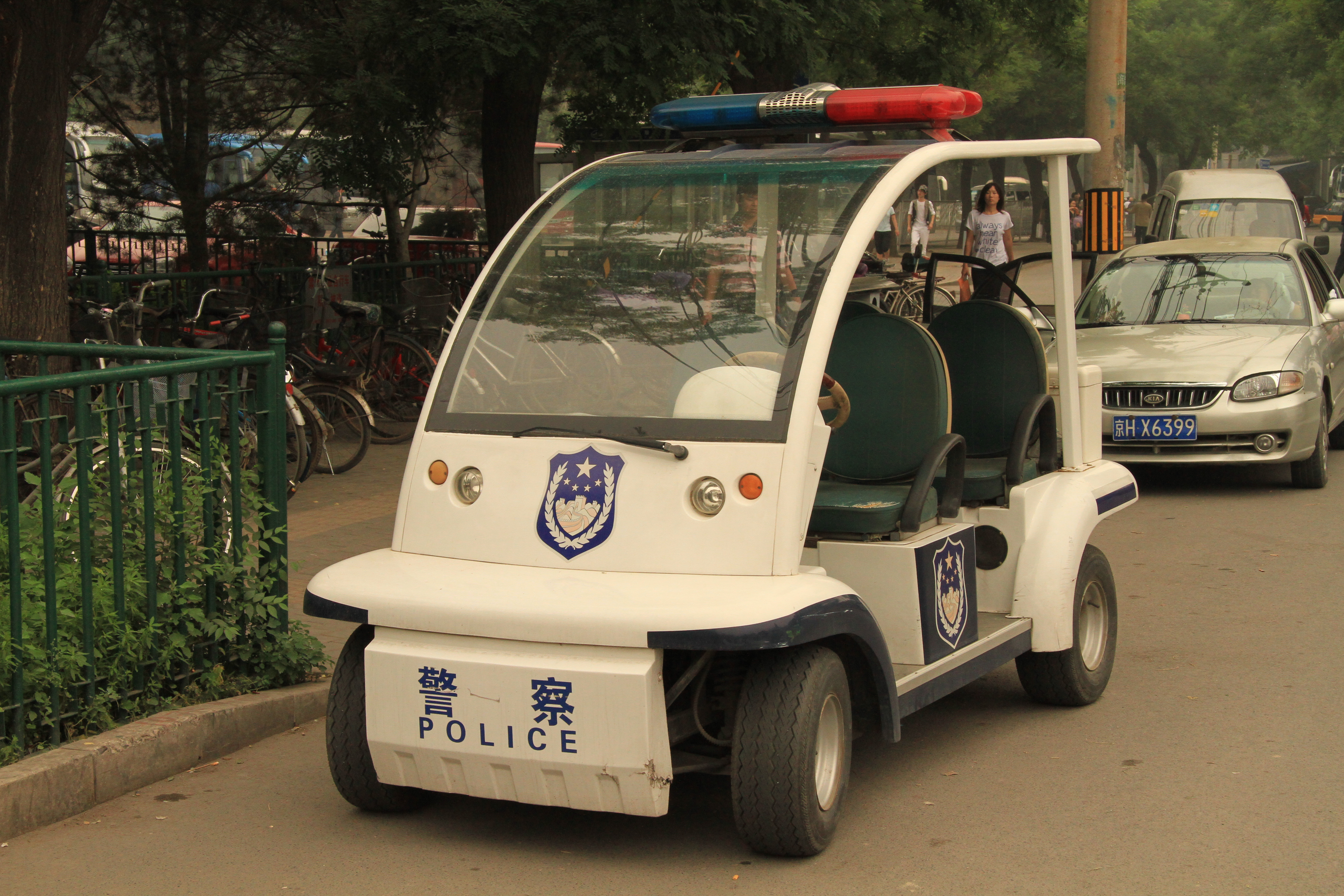

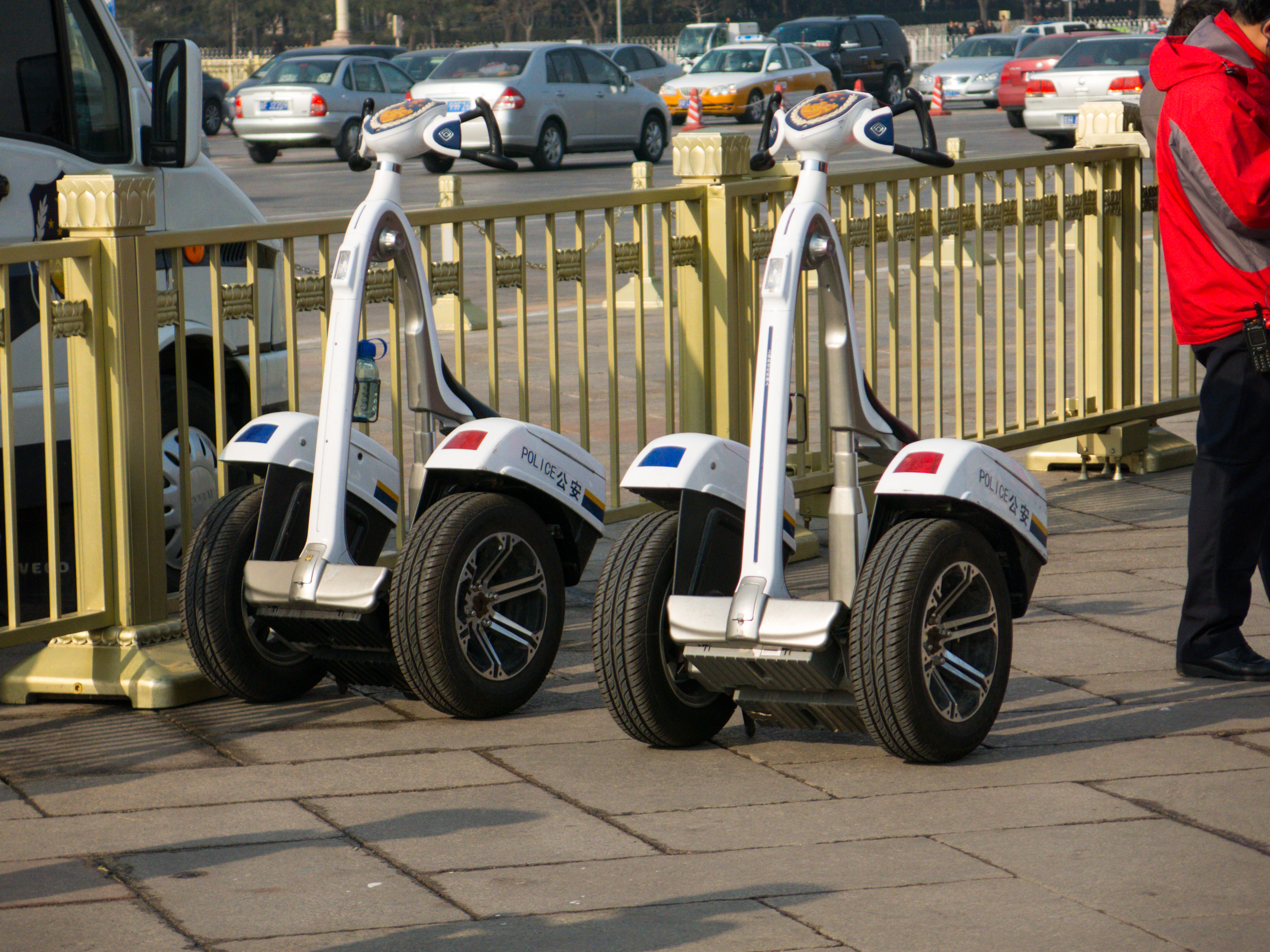

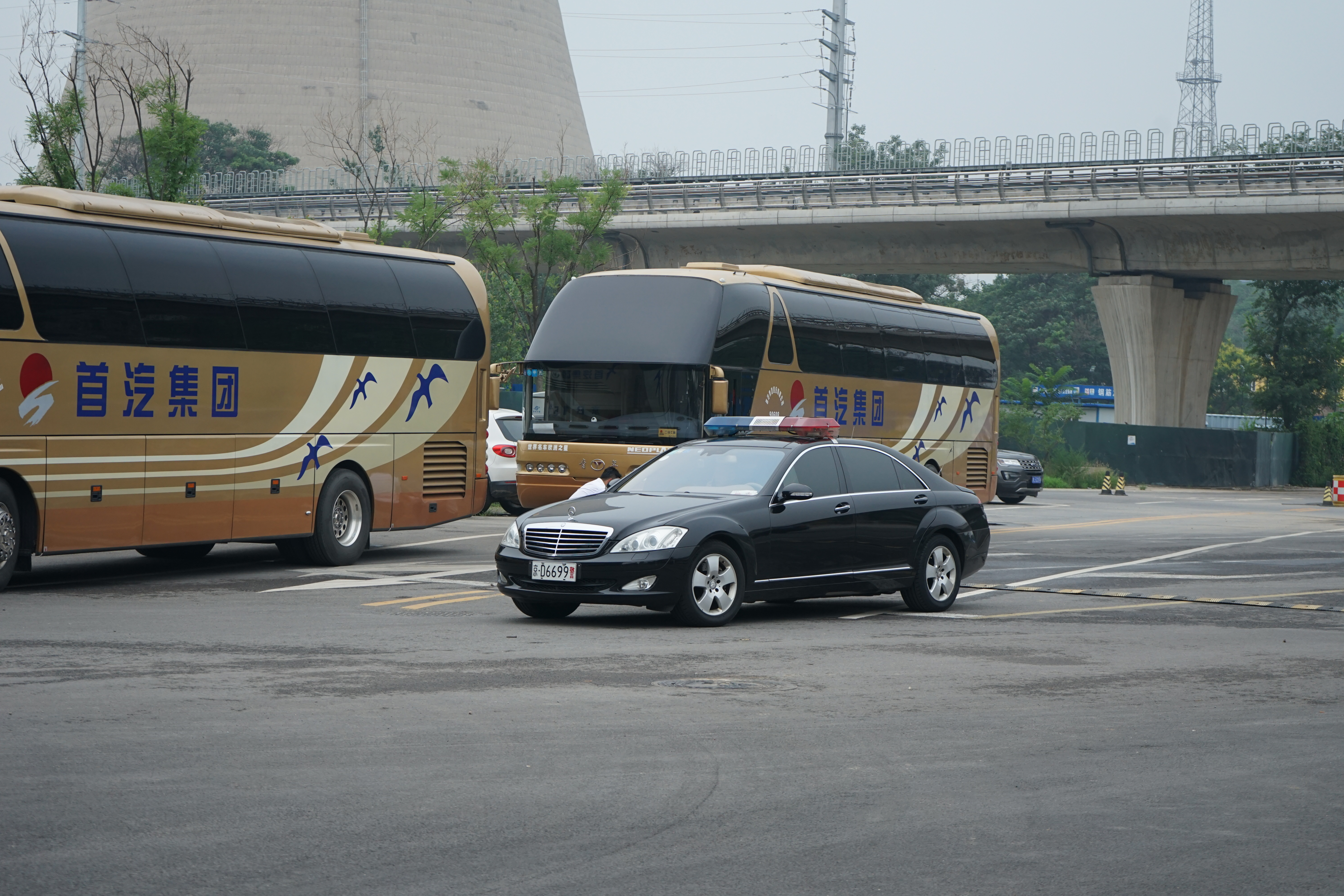
Mercedes-Benz S-Class (W221)

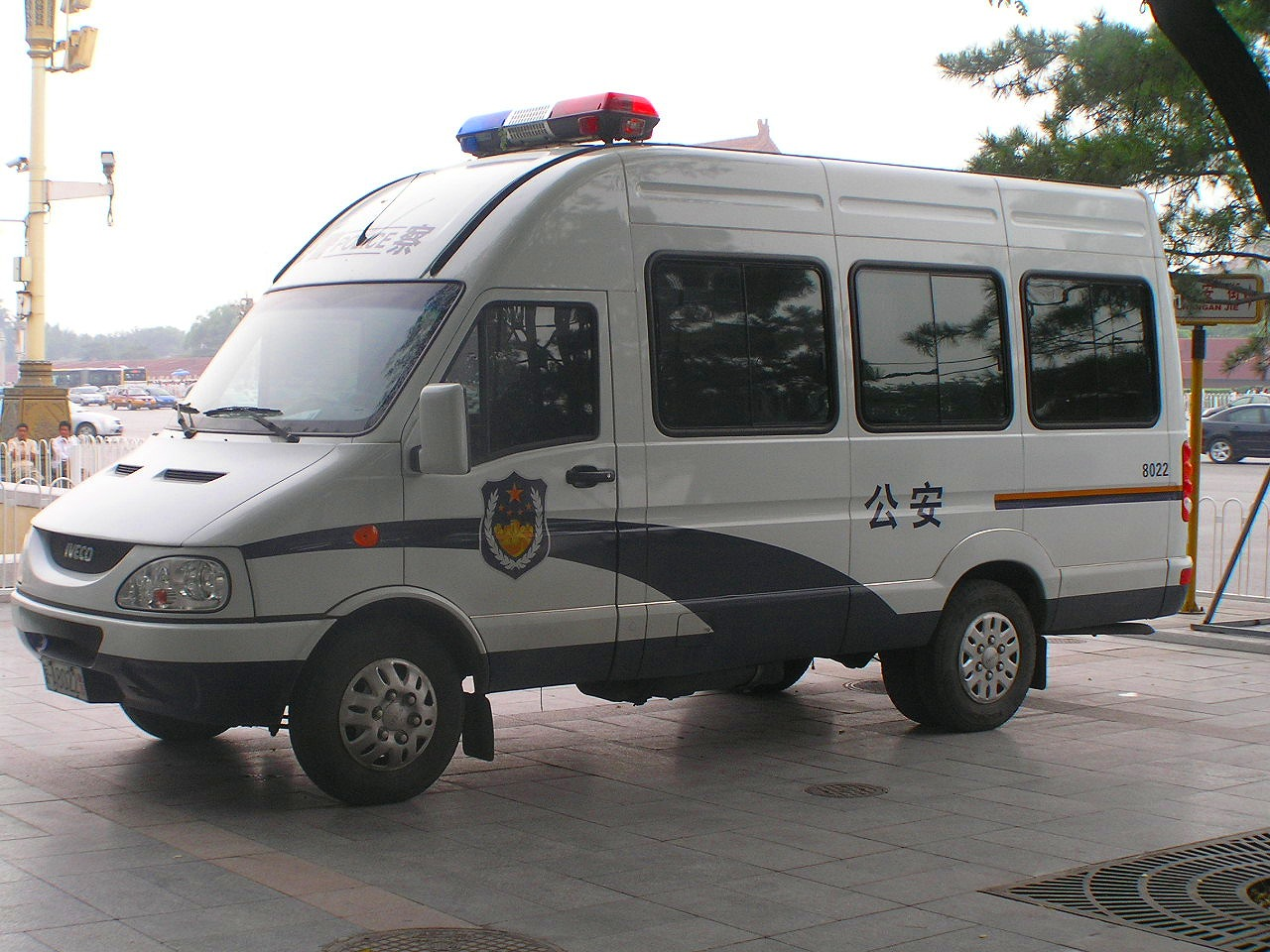
Iveco Daily

== Line of duty deaths ==
Since 1949, 398 officers of the Beijing PSB have died in the line of duty.

== See also ==
- Beijing Municipal Administration of Prisons
- Beijing State Security Bureau
- People's Armed Police Beijing Corps
- On the Beat, a 1995 film depicting officers of the Beijing Public Municipal Security Bureau (PSB)
- Shanghai Municipal Public Security Bureau
