= Cigarette burns =

Skin injuries caused by cigarettes

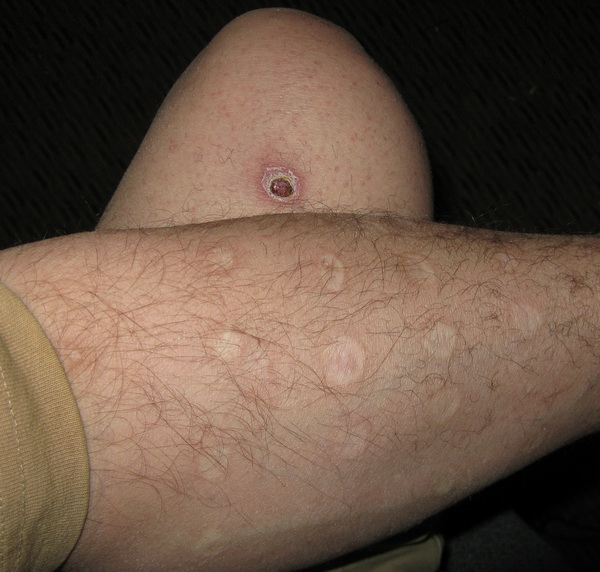
Multiple self-inflicted cigarette burns on a person’s forearm

Cigarette burns are (often deliberate) burn injuries caused by pressing a lit cigarette or cigar to the skin of a person. They are a common form of child abuse, self-harm, and torture. Cigarette burns are typically round and approximately 1 centimetre (0.4 in) in diameter, with a hypopigmented center and hyperpigmented periphery.
