= Beijing Office for Criminal Deportation =

Prison in Beijing, China

Beijing Tianhe Prison
- Location: No. 9 Qingfeng Road, Tiantianhe, Daxing District, Beijing, China
- Status: Operational
- Former name: Beijing Office for Criminal Deportation; Beijing Municipal Repatriation Department for Non-local Convicts
- Managed by: Beijing Municipal Prison Administration
- Director: Li Jinshan (Deputy Director)
- Website: Ministry of Justice website

Beijing Tianhe Prison (Chinese: 北京市天河监狱, also known as Beijing Office for Criminal Deportation) (Note: (Chinese: 北京市外地罪犯遣送处), sometimes also referred to as the Beijing Municipal Repatriation Department for Non-local Convicts) is a prison in Beijing, China. The prison facilitates the temporary detention of sentenced prisoners who are to be internally deported. The deportation function of the prison does not refer to enforcement of Chinese immigration law, but rather China's Hukou system, deporting Chinese citizens from the capital city to hometowns in outlying provinces where they will serve their sentences.

The prison facilitates the physical repatriations itself, with deportation missions embarking roughly once a week from the prison to various destinations by rail via guarded prison trains.

On average the prison detains 2,000 prisoners each year and repatriates 8,000. It is charged with the task of detaining and repatriating non-Beijing prisoners who commit crimes in Beijing and are sentenced to death with reprieve, life, or a fixed prison term.

== History ==
The prison was established on 10 July 1995 in the Qinghe Branch of the Beijing Municipal Prison Administration, re-established in the Tuanhe area of Daxing County in August 1999, and relocated to the Tiantianhe area of Daxing County on 11 November 2000.

The facility is China's only prison housing both male and female prisoners. It also sometimes also houses foreigners and juveniles.

== Services and visiting ==
The prison has a hospital on the premises. The facility is accessible by taking the Beijing Subway's Daxing Line to Tiangong Yuan station or by taking Beijing Bus No. 827 to the same station.

== See also ==
- List of prisons in Beijing municipality
