= Beijing Municipal No. 2 Prison =

Prison in Beijing, China

Beijing No. 2 Prison
- Location within Beijing Beijing Municipal No. 2 Prison (China)
- Location: Dougezhuang Township, Chaoyang District, Beijing, China; 39.8587°N 116.5510°E
- Status: Operational
- Managed by: Beijing Municipal Administration of Prisons

Beijing Municipal No. 2 Prison
- Simplified Chinese: 北京第二监狱
- Traditional Chinese: 北京第二監獄
Transcriptions
Standard Mandarin
- Hanyu Pinyin: Běijīng Shì Dì'èr Jiānyù

Beijing Municipal No. 2 Prison (Chinese: 北京市第二监狱; pinyin: Běijīng Shì Dì'èr Jiānyù) is a prison in the municipality of Beijing, China. Operated by the Beijing Municipal Administration of Prisons, it was established in 1950.

As of 2025 it is used to house prisoners who are not Chinese citizens.

== Inmate ==
African and Pakistani prisoners made up the largest groups in the facility, but there were also men being held from Afghanistan, Britain, Taiwan, Australia, the U.S., Latin America, and North Korea.

== Notable detainees ==
- Matthew Radalj - Australian citizen.
- Wong Kwong Yu - China's former richest man jailed for 14 years.

== See also ==
- List of prisons in Beijing municipality
