= Transnational repression by China =

PRC efforts to prevent political dissent outside its borders

The People's Republic of China (PRC) is widely alleged to exert control and silence dissent beyond its national borders. It targets groups and individuals perceived as threats to or critics of the ruling Chinese Communist Party (CCP) and its policies. Its methods of transnational repression include digital surveillance, physical intimidation, coercion, disinformation, and lawfare.

== Background ==
According to Freedom House, the People's Republic of China was responsible for 253 of 854 physical incidents of transnational repression from 2014 to 2022, making it the most extensive practitioner of transnational repression. In a statement for the U.S. Congressional-Executive Commission on China, Freedom House said that the estimate was conservative, "since these numbers do not include pressure put on the China-based relatives of targeted individuals, digital tactics like harassment and surveillance, or foiled attempts at physical violence". Transnational repression conducted by China has also escalated since 2014 under the general secretaryship of Xi Jinping. According to the Human Rights Measurement Initiative, the PRC engaged in transnational repression in at least 41 countries in 2025.

== Methods ==
- Surveillance: Monitoring activities of diaspora communities, employing spyware, stalking, and hacking telecommunications networks. Western cybersecurity agencies (Note: from the United Kingdom, the United States, Canada, New Zealand, Australia, and Germany) have warned of a growing threat posed by malware reportedly tied to Beijing's security services and being used to surveil critics of the Chinese government.
- Intimidation and threats: Threatening and detaining family members in China to coerce individuals abroad, physical intimidation, death threats, and phone calls. According to Amnesty International, increased threats to activists' family members include loss of jobs, retirement benefits, and physical freedom.
- Lawfare: Misusing Interpol Red Notices, or filing SLAPP lawsuits against the victims in the foreign countries where they reside. China's 2026 Law on Promoting Ethnic Unity and Progress provides that individuals and organizations outside China may be held accountable under Chinese law for acts deemed to undermine ethnic unity or incite ethnic separatism.
- Diplomatic pressure: Leveraging diplomatic ties to influence foreign governments.
- Digital harassment: Deploying cyberwarfare to track and intimidate individuals, including malware, online harassment campaigns, and AI-generated deepfakes.
- Control of mobility: Withholding or confiscating passports and controlling visa access to limit the movement of target groups.
- Forced disappearance and rendition.
- Disinformation campaigns: Conducting PRC-based disinformation operations against critics of the PRC and the Chinese Communist Party (CCP).

== Targets ==
=== Uyghurs ===
According to a study published in the academic journal Globalizations, the Chinese government's repression of Uyghurs extends beyond its borders. The study's Transnational Repression of Uyghurs Dataset documents 7,108 cases of Uyghurs being targeted in 44 countries between 1997 and 2021. While only 238 incidents were recorded from 1997 to 2014, an additional 6,870 cases occurred between 2014 and 2021.

The Chinese government's transnational repression of Uyghurs includes diplomatic pressure for extradition from countries like Thailand, Turkey, and Egypt, often without due process. Domestically, Uyghurs face passport confiscations in Xinjiang, limiting their travel. Abroad, they encounter digital surveillance and intimidation, with their families in China sometimes being used as leverage. These actions are part of China's larger strategy in dealing with the Uyghur community under what it describes as terrorism, infiltration, and separatism.

According to professor of East Asian Studies David Tobin, the Chinese government threatened a UK university for an academic's work on Uyghurs, leading to an institutional review that discussed whether to permit publicizing of any research on the region. Professor Steve Tsang has testified that the University of Nottingham closed its School of Contemporary China Studies under pressure from Beijing. In March 2026, Uyghur rights activists, including members of the World Uyghur Congress, were targeted with malware, allegedly linked to China, disguised as a Uyghur-language software tool.

In 2026, Human Rights Watch reported that Chinese authorities questioned Uyghur Australians visiting Xinjiang asking information about activists, community groups, and language schools in Australia. Per the report, Chinese authorities also put pressure on their relatives in Xinjiang, which made some Uyghurs in Australia afraid to join community activities or speak openly about the Chinese government.

=== Tibetans ===
According to the International Campaign for Tibet, Tibetan communities in countries like the United States, Sweden, and the Netherlands report surveillance and intimidation from the Chinese government. Chinese agents are involved in monitoring and threatening Tibetans, affecting their ability to criticize China's policies towards Tibet. Family members in China are sometimes used as leverage. The Chinese government also disrupts traditional Tibetan refugee routes in Nepal to India, increasing the risk of repatriation.

=== Hongkongers ===
The Center for American Progress wrote in 2022 that one of the most notable cases of transnational repression by the Chinese government, the 2015 kidnapping of bookseller and writer Gui Minhai in Thailand, was coordinated by the Ministry of Public Security.

Freedom House stated in 2021 that Hongkongers abroad are "relatively new targets of transnational repression".

In 2016, Hong Kong pro-democracy activist Joshua Wong was detained on arrival in Thailand. He had been invited to speak about his Umbrella Movement experience at an event hosted by Chulalongkorn University. A Thai student activist, Netiwit Chotiphatphaisal, said that Thai authorities had received a request from the Chinese government earlier regarding the visit. After nearly 12 hours' detention, Wong was deported to Hong Kong. Wong claimed that, upon detention, the authorities would say no more than that he had been blacklisted but, just prior to deportation, they informed him that his deportation was pursuant to the Thai Immigration Act.

The 2020 Hong Kong national security law (NSL) garnered attention to its Article 38, which states that the law also applies to offenses committed against Hong Kong "from outside the Region by a person who is not a permanent resident of the Region."

In a 2021 report, Freedom House wrote:

After large-scale prodemocracy protests broke out in Hong Kong in 2019, advocates traveling to Taiwan were followed, harassed, and attacked with red paint by pro-CCP groups, prompting police protection to be assigned to them. A Singaporean activist was jailed for 10 days in August 2020 for "illegal assembly" because of a Skype call he convened with Joshua Wong in 2016 during a discussion event in Singapore. With Beijing's imposition of a National Security Law on Hong Kong in June 2020, the net around Hong Kongers globally tightened. The law includes a provision with vast extraterritorial reach, potentially criminalizing any speech critical of the Chinese or Hong Kong government made anywhere in the world, including speech by foreign nationals.

The Freedom House report cited a news piece from The Guardian to name Samuel Chu "among those who received the first round of arrest warrants under the new law". Chu was born in Hong Kong and is a U.S. citizen residing in Los Angeles since 1996. He was charged for his advocacy work within the US-based Hong Kong Democracy Council that pushed the U.S. government to impose sanctions against Chinese officials deemed responsible for the erosion of basic freedoms in Hong Kong. Freedom House concluded: "Chu and others like him now must not only avoid traveling to Hong Kong, but also to any country with an extradition treaty with Hong Kong or China."

The Hong Kong Police Force has issued arrest warrants for the following pro-democracy Hongkongers now living abroad—Anna Kwok, Simon Cheng, Ted Hui, Dennis Kwok, Finn Lau, Honcques Laus, Nathan Law, Mung Siu-tat, Ray Wong, Kevin Yam, and Elmer Yuen. In July 2023, the U.S. Department of State described the bounties on eight of these dissidents as an instance of "transnational repression efforts."

The 2022 report by the Center for American Progress asked the U.S. government to promote reforms in Interpol, as the Chinese Ministry of Public Security "uses Interpol to pursue political dissidents via the Red Notice system, counter to the true criminal investigative purposes of the system."

In 2025, The Guardian reported that attorneys for Hong Kong publisher and activist Jimmy Lai have been targeted by phishing attempts linked to the PRC, rape threats, and death threats.

On February 11, 2026, a Hong Kong court convicted Kwok Yin-sang, the father of US-based democracy activist Anna Kwok, under the National Security Law, marking the first such conviction targeting a family member of an exiled activist. The conviction, for handling funds linked to his daughter's activism, exemplifies China's growing transnational repression. Human Rights Watch condemned the act as collective punishment, urging Hong Kong authorities to release Kwok. International calls have increased for sanctions against officials responsible for such repression.

=== Falun Gong practitioners ===
According to Freedom House and the Institute for Strategic Research (IRSEM), practitioners of Falun Gong globally face intense scrutiny under the PRC's transnational repression efforts. Notably, instances of detention involving Falun Gong adherents have been reported in several countries, including Thailand, Indonesia, Turkey, Kazakhstan, etc. A 2021 IRSEM study alleged 79 separate instances of transnational repression targeting Falun Gong practitioners. According to The Diplomat, Xi Jinping reportedly directed CCP officials in 2022 to intensify efforts to "completely, and on an international scale, suppress Falun Gong's momentum" by shaping global public opinion and using legal warfare against Falun Gong organizations abroad, including in the United States.

=== Former Chinese government officials ===
Operation Fox Hunt and Operation Sky Net are part of Xi Jinping's anti-corruption campaign after he came into power in 2014. Their stated goal is to repatriate Chinese fugitives that fled abroad. The operation spans across 56 countries, including countries where China does not have extradition treaties, such as the United States and Canada. According to Safeguard Defenders, kidnappings and other forms of coercion have been used to repatriate individuals.

=== Pro-democracy groups, dissidents and students ===
China targets the broad group of people with harassments, coercion, disinformation, and threats of violence and death. According to a CNN report on a Chinese online operation, "Victims face a barrage of tens of thousands of social media posts that call them traitors, dogs, and racist and homophobic slurs. They say it's all part of an effort to drive them into a state of constant fear and paranoia." Loyalist diaspora groups have also been used to target dissidents.

As of 2024, Chinese students studying abroad who engaged in political activism against the regime faced harassment and retribution directly or through family members living in China. In 2019, a student was jailed for six months when he returned to China over tweets he had posted while studying at the University of Minnesota in the US; a Chinese district court held that the tweets "defaced the image of the country's leaders" and sentenced the student "for provocation".

== Select cases ==
- 2014: Operation Fox Hunt started under Xi Jinping's anti-corruption campaign. Chinese operators in the U.S. had stalked, threatened U.S. residents and their relatives, including pressuring immigrants to become spies. The U.S. Department of Justice has been bringing cases against some Chinese operators for federal crimes.
- May 2016: A last-minute court ruling in Seoul canceled a series of music and dance performances by Shen Yun scheduled for the KBS hall. According to a Freedom House analyst, Shen Yun presents traditional Chinese culture, such as stories from classics and scenes from imperial dynasties, alongside portrayals of religious persecution of Falun Gong in today's world. The court's ruling cited "threats by the Chinese embassy aimed at the theater owner, including implicit references to financial reprisals if the shows go on as planned."
- March 2022: Arthur Liu (aka Liu Junguo), the father of American figure skater Alysa Liu, was targeted by a phone call requesting his and Alysa's passport numbers from a man claiming to be a U.S. Olympic official. Liu declined the call and reported to the U.S. Federal Bureau of Investigation (FBI). Five men, including Matthew Ziburis, were charged on suspicion of working as Chinese agents to conduct surveillance on dissidents, including Arthur and Alysa Liu. Arthur was labeled as "Dissident 3" and Alysa as "family member". Arthur was a student from Guangzhou, who took part in the Tiananmen Square protests in 1989 and fled to the U.S. via Hong Kong with as part of Operation Yellowbird. He raised five children, including Alysa. The call came as Alysa posted a video condemning the Chinese government for the persecution of Uyghurs in China. Alysa was later approached by a stranger in a cafeteria during the 2022 Beijing Winter Olympics who followed her and asked her to come to his apartment.
- April 2023: In a press release, the U.S. Department of Justice announced that it had charged 40 officers from China's national police in cases involving transnational repression schemes targeting individuals in the United States. These officers, who are believed to reside in China and other parts of Asia, face charges related to illegal harassment using fake social media accounts and censoring online meetings.
- April 2023: Lu Jianwang and Chen Jinping were charged in New York City for operating an illegal police station on behalf of China's Ministry of Public Security. Chen pleaded guilty in December 2024 to a charge of conspiracy to act as a PRC agent. In May 2026, Lu was convicted in federal court on charges related to acting as an unregistered agent of the Chinese government and obstruction of justice.
- April 2023: In a report published by the University of Sheffield, the authors noted several case studies of Chinese transnational repression of Uyghurs:
1. Najmudin Ablet traveled to Turkey from Xinjiang in 2016. His family members were later detained and sentenced by Chinese authorities. He was contacted by the Chinese police in 2019, offering him a glimpse of his family and proposing cooperation in exchange for their release, involving spying on Uyghurs in Turkey. Skeptical of their credibility, Ablet refused the proposal.
2. Erbaqyt Otarbay, an ethnic Kazakh from Xinjiang, endured conditions akin to those faced by Uyghurs during his internment from July 27, 2017, to May 23, 2019. Upon release, he was coerced into signing a nondisclosure agreement about the camp's operations. Despite this, Otarbay shared his ordeal upon his return to Kazakhstan, where he faced harassment from both Xinjiang and Kazakhstan authorities through calls and visits. Seeking refuge from this intimidation, he ultimately escaped to the UK, where he testified about his experiences at the Uyghur Tribunal on September 12, 2021.
- May 2023: the U.S. Department of Justice charged Los Angeles residents John Chen (aka Chen Jun) and Lin Feng with "acting and conspiring to act in the United States as unregistered agents of the People's Republic of China (PRC), conspiring to bribe and bribing a public official, and conspiracy to commit money laundering." The two were allegedly part of a PRC government-directed scheme that attempted to manipulate the Internal Revenue Service's Whistleblower Program in order to strip the tax-exempt status of a U.S. entity run by Falun Gong practitioners. Chen first filed a defective whistleblower complaint with the IRS. The two then paid $5,000 in cash bribes to a purported IRS official who was an undercover agent, and promised to pay substantially more for the official's assistance in advancing the complaint. On July 24 and 25, 2024, the two pleaded guilty to acting as unregistered agents of a foreign government and bribing a public official. Feng received a time-served sentence of 16 months in prison on September 26, 2024. On November 19, 2024, Chen was sentenced to 20 months.
- June 2023: Yong Zhu, a New York resident, was convicted of acting as an illegal foreign agent, stalking, and conspiracy to commit stalking to bully a former Chinese official in New Jersey into returning to China as part of the CCP's Operation Fox Hunt. In January 2025, Zhu was sentenced to two years in prison.
- November 2023: During the APEC United States 2023 summit in San Francisco, pro-CCP supporters attacked Chinese, Hong Kong, and Tibetan dissident protesters. According to The Washington Post, some of them have ties to various united front groups. U.S. officials and human rights groups have described the events as an example of PRC transnational repression.
- December 2023: Hong Kong Police issued a reward of 1 million Hong Kong dollars ($128,000) for information on five individuals involved in the 2019 Hong Kong protests against China's National Security Law, including a U.S. citizen. U.S. Secretary of State Antony Blinken criticized this initiative, calling it an act of transnational repression and referring to it as a "bounty list," and expressed the United States' rejection of such attempts to intimidate and target those who advocate for freedom and democracy.
- July 2024: The U.S. Department of Justice charged Ping Li, a resident of Florida and an immigrant from China, with conspiring to act as an undisclosed Chinese agent. Li has resided in the U.S. for 30 years and was an employee of telecommunications and information technology companies at different times. According to the press release, since around 2012, Li served as a contact working under the direction of China's Ministry of State Security (MSS), which is in charge of civilian intelligence collection. Li has obtained and provided to the MSS information regarding Chinese dissidents, pro-democracy advocates, members of Falun Gong, non-governmental organizations in the U.S., as well as his employers. In November 2024, Li was sentenced to 48 months in prison, a $250,000 fine and three years of supervised release after his prison term.
- December 2024: The U.S. Department of Justice arrested Los Angeles resident Yaoning "Mike" Sun for acting as an illegal PRC agent to influence U.S. local politicians on issues related to Taiwan and Falun Gong. Sun, who served as a campaign manager and business partner for a Southern California politician, was also charged with conspiring with John Chen, previously sentenced for acting as an illegal PRC agent and targeting U.S.-based Falun Gong practitioners. One of their goals was to undermine U.S. support for Falun Gong and pro-democracy movements. In October 2025, Sun agreed to plead guilty to acting as an illegal agent for the Chinese government, and was sentenced to four years in prison in February 2026.
- March 2025: Quanzhong An, a 58-year-old Chinese citizen and legal U.S. resident, was sentenced to 20 months in prison after pleading guilty in 2024 to acting as an illegal foreign agent. He was involved in a transnational Operation Fox Hunt campaign aimed at coercing a former manager of a Chinese state-owned company to return to China.
- April 2025: Private investigator and former New York police sergeant Michael McMahon was sentenced to 18 months following a 2023 conviction. He was convicted at trial for aiding and abetting in a transcontinental campaign pressuring the return of expatriate Xu Jin, a former Chinese official residing in the U.S. McMahon had searched databases and conducted surveillance to gather information on Xu. McMahon was among ten who were charged for this operation, which the U.S. deemed an Operation Fox Hunt campaign.
- April 2025: Swedish authorities arrested Dilshat Reshit, a Uyghur resident of Stockholm, on suspicion of spying on the Uyghur diaspora in Sweden on behalf of China. According to the World Uyghur Congress, Reshit had served as its Chinese-language spokesperson since 2004. The World Uyghur Congress removed Reshit and issued a warning about the extensive influence of Chinese espionage networks.
- July 2025: Officials from the Chinese Embassy in Bangkok demanded the removal of art deemed offensive to China in a Bangkok Art and Culture Centre (BACC) exhibition on authoritarian governments titled "Constellation of Complicity: Visualising the Global Machinery of Authoritarian Solidarity". Acting through Thailand's Ministry of Foreign Affairs and Bangkok Metropolitan Administration, several pieces of art created by Uyghur, Tibetan, and Hong Kong artists were removed or had the names of the artists blacked out.
- November 2025: The inaugural IndieChina Film Festival in New York City was canceled after numerous filmmakers pulled their films out of the screenings, citing Chinese government pressure on their families.
- November 2025: In 2025, a Kazakhstan court convicted 19 Kazakhstan citizens who are activists from the Nagyz Atajurt Volunteers Group over a November 2025 protest in Almaty criticizing alleged human rights abuses in Xinjiang. A day after the protest, the Chinese consulate in Almaty urged Kazakh authorities to act, prompting local authorities to file criminal charges of “inciting discord” and raising concerns about limits on peaceful protest and possible external pressure.
- May 2026: Access Now said that the Chinese government pressured Zambia to cancel RightsCon 2026 a week before the conference was scheduled to take place unless Taiwanese participants were banned. The World Press Freedom Day conference later in the month also had its schedule disrupted.

== Responses ==
- The FBI adopted a definition of "The China Threat", and launched a website for victims to report such acts by foreign governments.
- In 2022, the U.K. government established a Defending Democracy Taskforce. One of this Taskforce's goals was to address foreign states' efforts to suppress free expression in the diaspora communities.
- The Transnational Repression Policy Act was introduced by a bipartisan group of U.S. senators on March 16, 2023. The bill was re-introduced in 2025, but did not pass, and again re-introduced in 2026.
- The U.S. government under the Obama Administration warned and negotiated with China about their Fox Hunt operations on U.S. soil.
- In April 2023, the Justice Department charged 40 Chinese national police officers on accounts of targeting dissidents in transnational repression efforts.
- In February 2024, police in Istanbul, Turkey detained six individuals suspected of espionage activities against Uyghurs on behalf of China's intelligence forces, while searching for another suspect. The seven individuals were believed to have been spying on and obtaining information on notable Uyghurs as well as related associations in Turkey.
- In February 2024, Madrid-based human rights group Safeguard Defenders launched a center to provide free legal assistance to dissidents and activists facing transnational repression by China.
- In September 2024, a congressional hearing was held on the CCP's tactic of utilizing the U.S. legal system to target dissidents and critics.
- In response to Operation Fox Hunt, in November 2024, Texas Governor Greg Abbott ordered the Texas Department of Public Safety to arrest those attempting to conduct influence operations to return dissidents to China.
- In January 2025, a public inquiry in Canada named the PRC as "the most active perpetrator of foreign interference targeting Canada's democratic institutions."
- In March 2025, Uyghur activists filed a lawsuit in France alleging that the Chinese embassy in Paris engaged in transnational repression against them.
- In March 2025, the U.S. Department of State sanctioned six Chinese and Hong Kong officials who were alleged to engage in transnational repression for attempting "to intimidate, silence, and harass 19 pro-democracy activists who were forced to flee overseas".
- In June 2025, several Canadian members of parliament called on the executive to enforce the 2024 Countering Foreign Interference Act following an International Consortium of Investigative Journalists and CBC News investigation into PRC repression and pressure tactics inside Canada.
- In June 2025, Nebraska enacted the Crush Transnational Repression in Nebraska Act to combat the influence and manipulation of its state and local officials and residents by foreign adversaries. The legislation addresses activities linked to the PRC and other adversaries.
- In July 2025, the UK Joint Committee on Human Rights labelled the PRC a "flagrant" perpetrator of transnational repression and presented a series of recommended responses to the UK government.
- In August 2025, Texas governor Greg Abbott signed a law creating a criminal offense for transnational repression.
- In August 2025, Canada announced that it would appoint its first foreign interference commissioner to strengthen the country's capacity to respond to transnational repression.
- In September 2025, the Office of the United Nations High Commissioner for Human Rights released a report documenting instances of transnational repression by China and other countries against human rights activists.
- In March 2026, the Italian Ministry of the Interior ordered the expulsion of eight Chinese nationals suspected of spying on dissidents and conducting transnational repression on Italian soil.
- In June 2026, French authorities announced that counterintelligence services dismantled nine clandestine Chinese police stations in France operated by China's Ministry of Public Security to monitor the Chinese diaspora and target dissidents.
- In July 2026, Taiwanese president Lai Ching-te announced that his government would enact assistance and protection mechanisms for any Taiwanese citizen targeted by the PRC's Law on Promoting Ethnic Unity and Progress.
- In July 2026, prompted by China's Law on Promoting Ethnic Unity and Progress, the U.S. introduced the Stop Transnational Repression Act (STRA) to codify transnational repression in law and increase criminal penalties for it.
- In October 2026, Italian prosecutors were reported to be preparing to criminally charge eight Chinese nationals and two Italian citizens for harassing Teacher Li.

== See also ==
- Conspiracy against rights
- Extraterritorial operation
- Hidden front
- Three warfares
- Transnational lawfare by China
- United front (China)
