= Sam Mahmoudi =

Iranian political prisoner (born 1976)

Sam Mahmoudi Sarabi
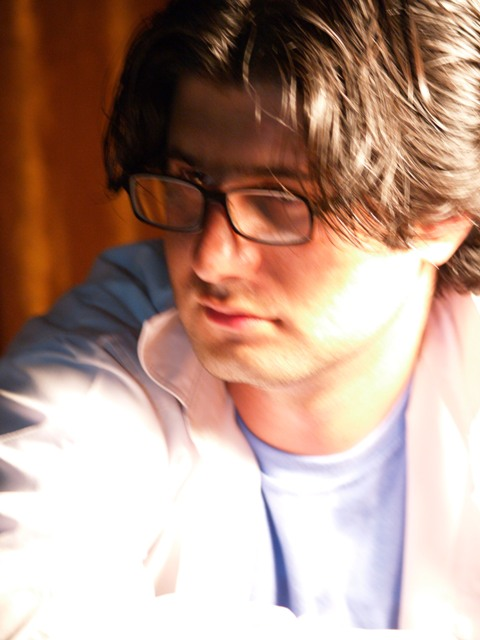
- Sam Mahmoudi in 2011

Sam. M. Sarabi was an Iranian journalist and the main editor for the Idea & History and Book services of the Shargh Newspaper.

== Life ==
He was summoned to the Intelligence Ministry on February 14, 2011, and has been in detention since then. Between 2012 and 2014, Sarabi was a Middle East and North Africa (MENA) Advisor at Human Rights Watch (HRW). During this time, he traveled to Syria and Iraq several times as a reporter and has consequently been awarded several prizes for his work. After leaving his occupation as an advisor, he worked as a freelance journalist. He collaborated with some Persian opposition media like Roozonline, Radiozamaneh, the Persian department of the London branch of Al-Sharq Al-Awsat Newspaper, Khodnevis, and more.

Sarabi, along with Majid Niknam, Babak Ejlali, Ruhollah Zam, and Ahmad Shams, is one of the founders of Amadnews, for which he was the chief editor for over two years. The intelligence forces of the Iranian Revolutionary Guard Corps have repeatedly launched unsuccessful operations to assassinate Sarabi. Sarabi's colleague Ruhollah Zam, however, was arrested in Iraq and executed in Iran.

== Prison ==
According to the Human Rights House of Iran, there is no information about his arrest and the alleged charges. His summons order took place during a phone call.

Sarabi was arrested during the Ashura events and was held in detention for 8 years. The charges against him are propaganda against the regime, insulting the leader, writing the song “I Confess...”, and possessing a copy of Salman Rushdie's The Satanic Verses.

Sarabi told his interrogators he acquired the controversial novel because he planned to publish a special article on the anniversary of the death sentence issued by Ayatollah Khomeini against Rushdie.

Sarabi was arrested for more than a month during the protests that followed the disputed re-election of Mahmoud Ahmadinejad and was released on a $300,000 bond.

== See also ==
- Hoda Saber
- Haleh Sahabi
