= Chinese police overseas service stations =

Chinese police presence abroad

- Simplified Chinese: 海外服务站
Transcriptions
Standard Mandarin
- Hanyu Pinyin: hǎiwài fúwù zhàn

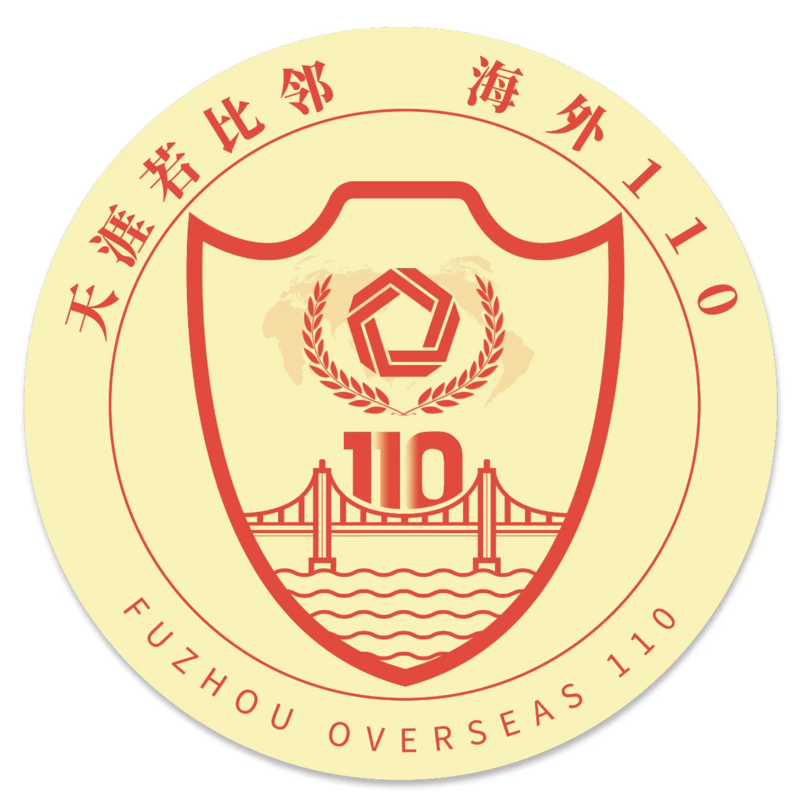
Badge of Fuzhou overseas police operations

The term "overseas service station" and the associated phrase, "Overseas 110" or "110 Overseas" (Chinese: 海外110; pinyin: hǎiwài yāoyāolíng; lit. 'abroad 110'; alluding to China's emergency number for the police, 110), refer to various overseas offices established in other countries by local public security bureaus of the People's Republic of China.

In 2022, Chinese police overseas service stations garnered public attention after human rights group Safeguard Defenders published a report accusing the Chinese government of illegally using the stations to intimidate Chinese dissidents and criminal suspects abroad and to pressure them to return to China. The report led to investigations of the stations by the governments of several countries.

== History ==
The stations were first established in 2014 with the official stated purpose of assisting overseas Chinese with routine paperwork and liaising with national law enforcement in the countries in which they reside. They are most common among public security bureaus in Fujian Province due to the large amount of overseas Chinese originating from Fujian.

=== Safeguard Defenders report ===
According to Matt Schrader, writing for the Jamestown Foundation, "overseas Chinese service stations" (Chinese: 华助中心; pinyin: huázhù zhōngxīn; lit. 'Chinese assistance center') were first established in 2014, with 45 centers in 39 countries having been opened by 2019. According to Schrader, the centers were mostly formed from existing united front organizations and did not have policing authority. Schrader further stated that the centers served several legitimate purposes despite criticism of them, such as assisting crime victims with dealing with the host country's police and integrating new immigrants. Schrader pointed to a lack of transparency around the relationship between the centers and the Chinese government, particularly personnel of the United Front Work Department (UFWD), and their political influence operations.

The Nantong police department later set up the first "overseas service stations", associated with the phrase "110 Overseas" (Chinese: 海外110; pinyin: hǎiwài yībǎiyīshí; lit. 'abroad 110'), as part of a pilot project in 2016. The department set up offices in six countries and had solved at least 120 criminal cases that involved Chinese nationals, as well as detaining over 80 people in Myanmar, Cambodia, and Zambia. Dutch organizations RTL News and "Follow the Money" found that afterwards, Wenzhou's public security bureau established a "contact point" in Sydney, Australia, and the Lishui public security bureau established two offices in the Netherlands (one in Amsterdam, another in Rotterdam) in 2018. The police agencies of Fuzhou and Qingtian counties would set up the most numerous of the offices, with the latter beginning their program in 2019. Radio Free Asia reported that as of October 2022, a total of 54 such stations had been established in 30 countries.

Safeguard Defenders released an initial report in September 2022 and a follow-up in December 2022, alleging that the police stations were part of a program named Operation Fox Hunt, and were used to harass and coerce individuals wanted by the Chinese government, including dissidents, via threats to their families and themselves, pressuring them to return to China, where they would then be detained. Safeguard Defenders claimed that, between April 2021 and July 2022, the Chinese government recorded 230,000 "suspects of fraud" who were "persuaded to return". The group stated that the stations violated the sovereignty of host countries by allowing Chinese police to circumvent police cooperation rules and procedures. For instance, Wang Jingyu, a dissident who fled China after being targeted for social media posts and was granted asylum in the Netherlands, claimed he had been threatened and sent harassing messages by the Rotterdam station to make him return to China, with his parents who remained in China being targeted. Wang was later found to have fabricated the threats. A broader example was a notice issued by an overseas station operated by the government of Laiyang in Myanmar, which stated that Chinese nationals who were there illegally should return to China or "there would be consequences for their loved ones", such as cancellation of their state benefits. An anonymous official from the Chinese Ministry of Foreign Affairs, in an interview with El Correo, stated that the stations used "persuasion" tactics to convince those wanted by the government to return to China, pointing to the difficulties of getting European states to extradite to China.

==== Reactions ====
Immediately after the release of the Safeguard Defenders report, one of its authors, Laura Harth, was targeted with anonymous deepfake pornography. According to Yale legal scholar and China expert Jeremy Daum, the report contained several factual and context errors. Safeguard Defenders subsequently published a revised report which it said corrected some of the mistakes Daum had indicated.

Chinese dissidents living outside of China found the overseas police service stations threatening. Chong Ja Ian, an associate professor of political science at the National University of Singapore, said that the stations needed registration regardless of their purpose, adding the controversy "raises doubts about the actuality of [China's] commitment to rule of law and respect for sovereignty despite official statements otherwise."

=== Investigations by other governments ===
In response, some countries, including the United States, Canada, Japan, the United Kingdom, Spain, Portugal, and the Netherlands, announced they would investigate the stations.

==== Australia ====
In November 2022, Australian Federal Police told a senate hearing that they do not believe that Chinese police are maintaining such a station in Sydney. However, a December 2022 report refuted the AFP's assertion and claimed that there were two Chinese police stations in the country.

==== Canada ====
In November 2022, Canada summoned the Chinese ambassador Cong Peiwu and issued a cease and desist warning concerning the stations.

In March 2023, the Royal Canadian Mounted Police (RCMP) announced investigations into two alleged police stations in Quebec. The RCMP concluded its investigation without recommending any charges in September 2025.

Two Chinese community groups in the Montreal area have declared they will sue the RCMP if they do not apologize for their accusations of them hosting secret Chinese police stations and are seeking $2.5 million in damages. Maryse Lapointe, the groups' lawyer, called the allegations false and defamatory. Mei Chiu, coordinator of the Chinatown roundtable in Montreal, criticized the RCMP's investigation on these groups for not even asking to talk to the employees, and only interviewing the board members. The groups say they have lost government funding, forcing them to cut back programs such as French language education and support of victims of domestic violence. The RCMP stated broadly: "some of the activity the RCMP is investigating is occurring at locations where other legitimate services to the Chinese Canadian Community are being offered."

Canadian intelligence analyst Scott McGregor and journalist Ina Mitchell noted in their 2023 book, The Mosaic Effect, that S.U.C.C.E.S.S., a Canadian social services organization headquartered in Vancouver, British Columbia, that is listed as an "Overseas Chinese Services Organization" by the Overseas Chinese Affairs Office (OCAO), is an example of an organization that provides legitimate services to the Chinese Canadian Community while also working with entities tied to Operation Foxhunt. In July 2024, the Canadian government announced that it had mapped Chinese police stations in the country and would share the information with the G7 to explore a response.

==== France ====
In June 2025, French authorities suspended the deportation of a Chinese businessman that the General Directorate for Internal Security (DGSI) suspected of operating a secret police station from within a Fujian hometown association. In June 2026, it was reported that French counterintelligence services had dismantled nine clandestine stations operating under China's Ministry of Public Security used to spy on dissidents.

==== Germany ====
In the fall of 2022, the first reports about Chinese police overseas service stations in Germany appeared. At least five stations existed in Germany. In March 2023, politician Rita Schwarzelühr-Sutter (SPD) stated that two police stations remain operational in Germany, in violation of the country's sovereignty. She stated that they are run by "people who have good contacts with the diplomatic missions of the People's Republic of China and who enjoy the trust of the Chinese security authorities. They are also involved in Chinese united front organizations."

An investigation of German TV RTL/ntv from November 2024 showed that at least four of the stations in Berlin, Hamburg, Düsseldorf, München and one in the Ruhrarea are still active.

==== Ireland ====
The overseas service stations in Dublin were ordered to close by the Irish Ministry of Foreign Affairs in late October 2022, although one had already ceased operations and took down its sign earlier when electronic ID renewal procedures were introduced.

==== Italy ====
In December 2022, Italy announced that its police would cease joint patrols with Chinese police officers inside of Italian cities, with interior minister Matteo Piantedosi clarifying that the patrols in question had no relation to the overseas stations. In 2023, a ProPublica investigation found that the leaders of "Fuzhou Police Overseas Service Station" in Prato had ties to organized crime.

==== Japan ====
In February 2024, Tokyo police raided an overseas police station as part of a COVID-19 fraud investigation. Japanese media reported that an attempt to establish an overseas police station in Okinawa was rebuffed.

==== Netherlands ====
The Dutch Ministry of Foreign Affairs also stated that, as the Chinese government had failed to notify the country about the stations through diplomatic means, they had been operating illegally, with further investigation to be conducted into their conduct. Foreign minister Wopke Hoekstra later ordered both offices to close. The mayor of Amsterdam later announced in February 2023 that the Amsterdam police were unable to locate any police stations in the city.

==== New Zealand ====
According to Safeguard Defenders' December 2022 report, Chinese police in Nantong were operating an "overseas sub-centre" in New Zealand as well as an "overseas Chinese service centre" in Auckland. In response, the Foreign Minister Nanaia Mahuta expressed concern about the presence of alleged Chinese police overseas stations while The Department of the Prime Minister and Cabinet, Ministry of Foreign Affairs and Trade and New Zealand Police confirmed they were reviewing the group's report. In response to a Stuff media query, the Chinese Embassy in Wellington said that the alleged police overseas stations were actually overseas Chinese service centres run by local Chinese. National Party MP Simon O'Connor, a co-chair of the New Zealand branch of the Inter-Parliamentary Alliance on China, defended Safeguard Defenders' report and said that members of the local Chinese community had raised concerns about these police overseas stations in New Zealand.

In November 2026 a follow-up Safeguard Defenders' report, entitled "A Formula for Repression," alleged that Chinese authorities used 10 "liaison points" in New Zealand as part of a global network for monitoring and controlling diaspora Chinese communities. Four of these "liaison points" were situated in Auckland, including a branch of the Nantong police.

==== South Korea ====
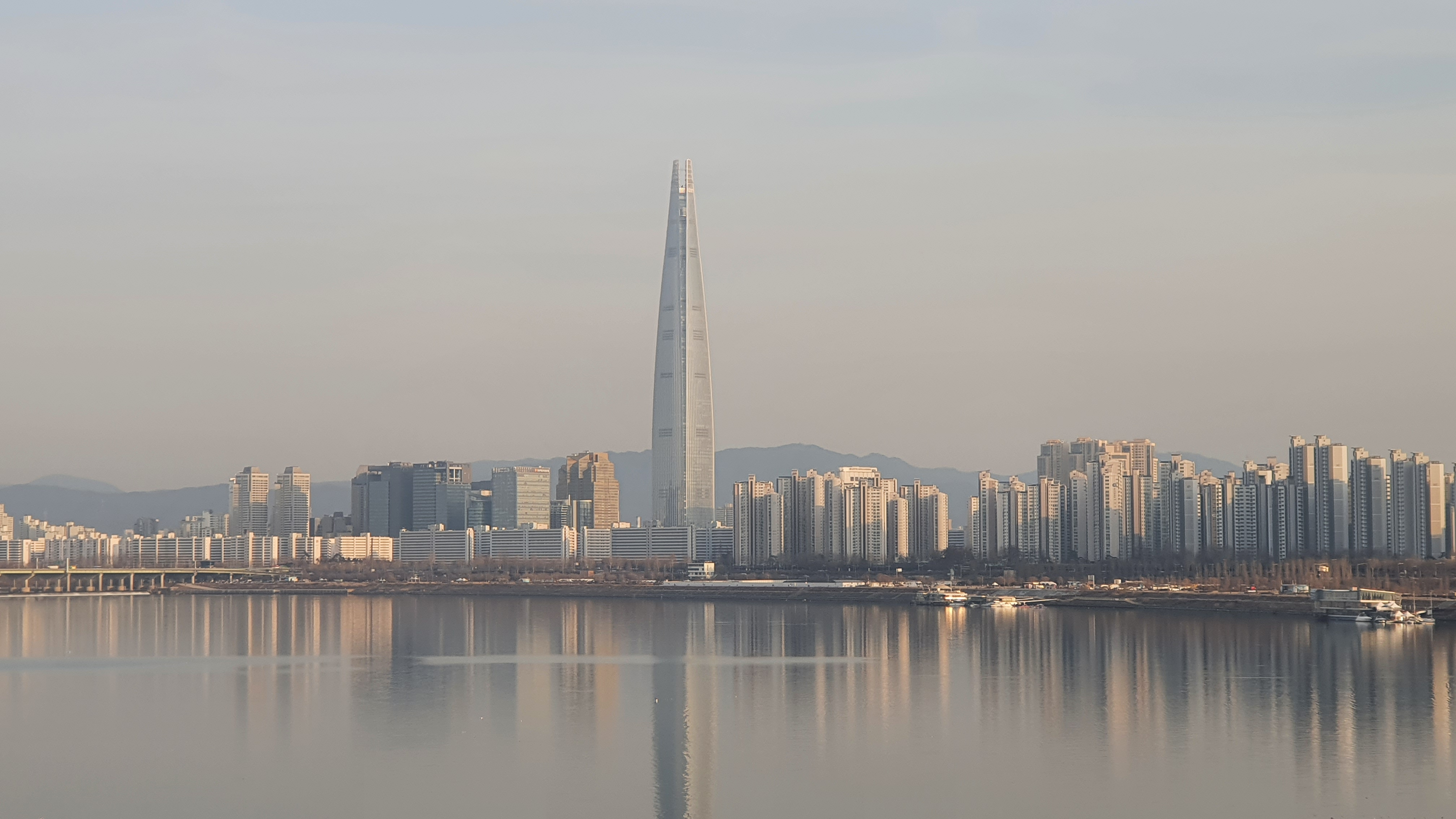
Lotte World Tower and the Han River seen from Seoul Subway Line 7 train running across Cheongdam Bridge. A river-side Chinese restaurant alleged to be acting as an overseas police station is on the far right.

In June 2023, it was reported that South Korean authorities were investigating Chinese police overseas service stations in the country. In response, the authorities shuttered a Chinese police station at a restaurant on the Han River and legislators began crafting new legislation to close loopholes in the country's counterespionage laws.

==== Taiwan ====
In March 2023, Taiwan's Overseas Community Affairs Council (OCAC) said that a Chinese overseas police station in France engaged in cyberattacks against an OCAC language school in France.

In a May 2023 report to the Legislative Yuan Taiwan's National Security Bureau (NSB) said that they had identified over 100 secret Chinese police stations around the world targeting the overseas Chinese community. The covert locations the stations operated from included restaurants, convenience stores, and private homes. The NSB said that it was collaborating with law enforcement in other countries on the issue.

==== United Kingdom ====
In May 2023, Ruiyou Lin, who runs a food delivery app in London, denied that his business was used as the base for a Chinese government "secret police station".

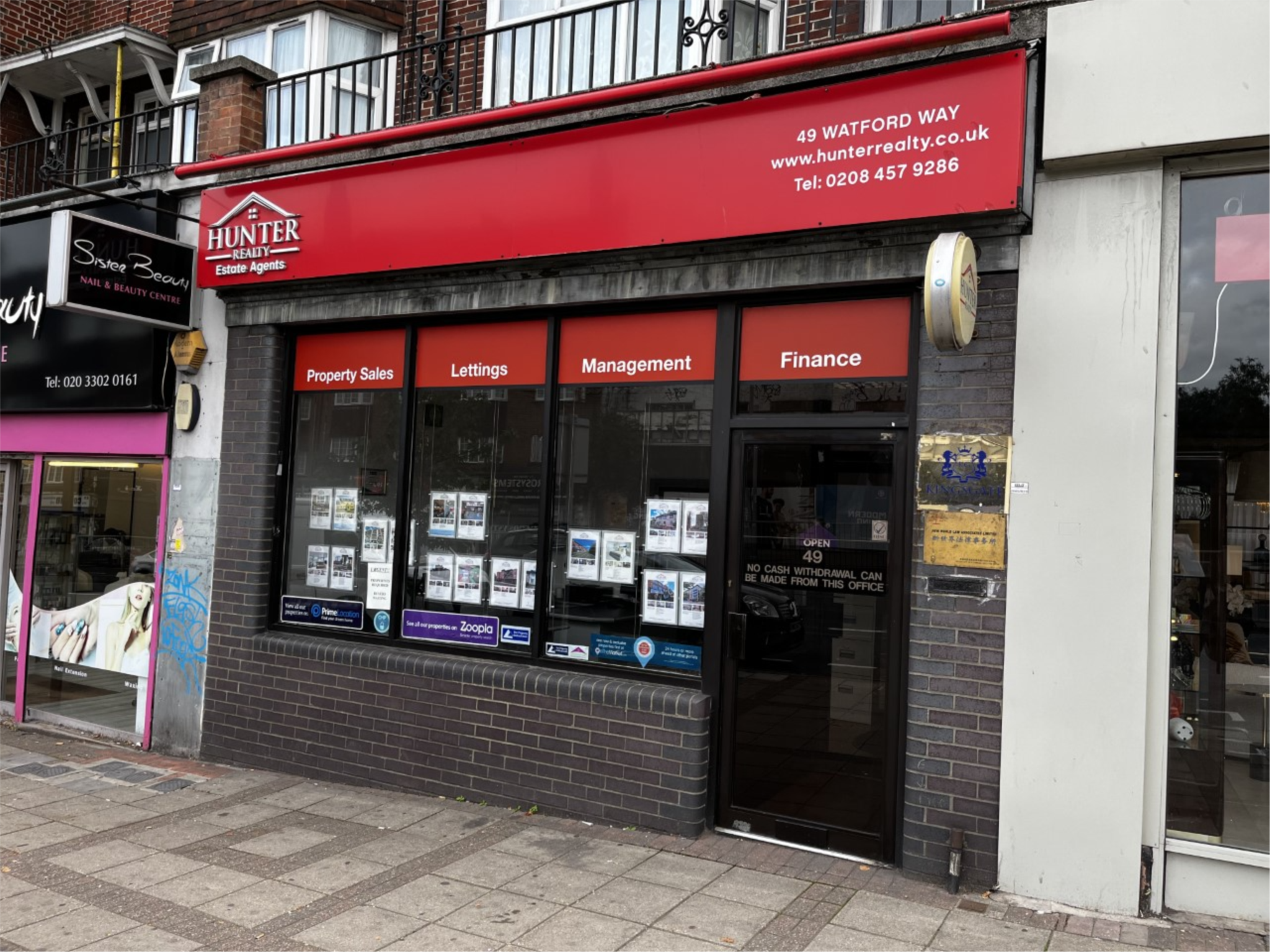
49 Watford Way, one of the alleged overseas police stations, in London, United Kingdom

In June 2023, British Security Minister Tom Tugendhat stated that China had closed its police service stations in Britain and that an investigation found no illegal activity associated with the stations.

==== United States ====
In November 2022, Federal Bureau of Investigation (FBI) director Christopher A. Wray announced that the FBI was monitoring reports of the Chinese government establishing unregistered police stations in the U.S., commenting that the conduct was "outrageous", violated U.S. sovereignty, and "circumvents standard judicial and law enforcement cooperation processes."

In January 2023, The New York Times reported that according to anonymous tipsters, counterintelligence agents from the Federal Bureau of Investigation raided a suspected station set up by Fuzhou municipal authorities, hosted in the offices of the American Changle Association (named after Changle District) in Chinatown, Manhattan, in late 2022. The station reportedly occupied an entire floor. It shuttered after an October 2022 FBI raid.

In April 2023, the FBI arrested two American citizens: "Harry" Lu Jianwang and Chen Jinping. They were charged by federal prosecutors in Brooklyn (the U.S. Attorney's Office for the Eastern District of New York) with conspiring to act as unregistered agents of the Chinese government for operating the police outpost in Manhattan, and with obstruction of justice for deleting messages with an official of the Ministry of Public Security (MPS) who had been directing their activities in the U.S. Prosecutors said that Lu began to aid China's attempts to repress dissidents living in the U.S. in 2015. On the same day, the US Department of Justice unsealed charges against 34 MPS officers, charging them with "transnational repression offenses targeting U.S. residents" and alleging the use of fake social media accounts to harass and intimidate Chinese nationals in the U.S., with the intent to suppress free speech of Chinese dissidents living abroad. The 34 officers are believed to be living in China, and are all members of the "912 Special Project Working Group", an Internet-based government influencing effort to enhance global perceptions of China.

U.S. Attorney Breon Peace said the episode "reveals the Chinese government's flagrant violation of our nation's sovereignty"; Assistant Attorney General Matthew Olsen of the United States Department of Justice National Security Division said that the Chinese government's actions "go far beyond the bounds of acceptable nation-state conduct" and were an attempt to extend "authoritarian repression" to the U.S.

In July 2023, a group of U.S. senators asked the United States Department of Justice to investigate "Overseas Chinese Service Centers" with alleged ties to the UFWD that are operating in seven U.S. cities.

In December 2024, a Manhattan resident, Chen Jinping, pleaded guilty to conspiracy to act as an agent of a foreign government in connection with the establishment of an overseas police station in Chinatown, Manhattan raided in October 2022. In May 2026, "Harry" Lu Jianwang was found guilty in a federal jury trial of acting as an unregistered foreign agent of China.

=== Chinese government response ===
Officially, the centers provide services to Chinese nationals outside of China. They are used to renew driver's license and other document—particularly during the COVID-19 pandemic—and confront transnational crime, especially fraud. According to Chinese government sources, the centers target illegal or criminal activities affecting overseas Chinese communities. They also provide advice in emergency situations, such as directing callers to local police or Chinese diplomatic missions.

== Locations ==
Chinese police overseas service station ("Overseas 110") presence around the world
#	Country	City (location in city)	Continent	Associated public security bureau	Active years	Ref.
BRN01	Brunei	Bandar Seri Begawan^{C}	Asia	Fuzhou City Public Security Bureau	na.	
IDN01	Indonesia	Jakarta^{C}	Asia	Nantong City Public Security Bureau	2016-?	
KHM01	Cambodia	Phnom Penh^{C}	Asia	Qingtian County Public Security Bureau	na.	
KHM02	Cambodia	unknown city	Asia	Nantong City Public Security Bureau	2016–?	
JPN01	Japan	Tokyo^{C}	Asia	Fuzhou City Public Security Bureau	na.	
KOR01	South Korea	Seoul^{C}	Asia	Nantong City Public Security Bureau	na.	
MNG01	Mongolia	Ulaanbaatar^{C}	Asia	Fuzhou City Public Security Bureau	na.	
UZB01	Uzbekistan	Sirdaryo	Asia	Fuzhou City Public Security Bureau	na.	
MMR01	Myanmar	Yangon	Asia	Nantong City Public Security Bureau	2016–?	
MMR02	Myanmar	unknown city	Asia	Laiyang City Public Security Bureau	na.	
AUS01	Australia	Sydney	Oceania	Wenzhou City Public Security Bureau	2018–?	
AUT01	Austria	Vienna^{C}	Europe	Qingtian County Public Security Bureau	na.	
CZE01	Czechia	Prague^{C}	Europe	Fuzhou City Public Security Bureau	na.	
CZE02	Czechia	Prague^{C}	Europe	Qingtian County Public Security Bureau	na.	
FRA01	France	Paris^{C}	Europe	Fuzhou City Public Security Bureau	na.	
FRA02	France	Paris^{C}	Europe	Fuzhou City Public Security Bureau	na.	
FRA03	France	Paris^{C}	Europe	Qingtian County Public Security Bureau	na.	
DEU01	Germany	Frankfurt	Europe	Qingtian County Public Security Bureau	na.	
GRC01	Greece	Athens^{C}	Europe	Fuzhou City Public Security Bureau	na.	
HUN01	Hungary	Budapest^{C}	Europe	Fuzhou City Public Security Bureau	na.	
HUN02	Hungary	Budapest^{C}	Europe	Qingtian County Public Security Bureau	na.	
IRL01	Ireland	Dublin^{C} (Capel Street)	Europe	Fuzhou City Public Security Bureau	2022	
ITA02	Italy	Florence	Europe	Qingtian County Public Security Bureau	na.	
ITA03	Italy	Milan	Europe	Qingtian County Public Security Bureau	na.	
ITA04	Italy	Prato	Europe	Fuzhou City Public Security Bureau	na.	
ITA01	Italy	Rome^{C}	Europe	Qingtian County Public Security Bureau	na.	
NLD01	The Netherlands	Amsterdam^{C}	Europe	Lishui City Public Security Bureau	2018–?	
NLD02	The Netherlands	Amsterdam^{C}	Europe	Qingtian County Public Security Bureau	na.	
NLD03	The Netherlands	Rotterdam	Europe	Fuzhou City Public Security Bureau	na.	
NLD04	The Netherlands	Rotterdam	Europe	Lishui City Public Security Bureau	2018–?	
PRT01	Portugal	Lisbon^{C}	Europe	Qingtian County Public Security Bureau	na.	
PRT02	Portugal	Madeira	Europe	Fuzhou City Public Security Bureau	na.	
PRT03	Portugal	Porto	Europe	Fuzhou City Public Security Bureau	na.	
SRB01	Serbia	Belgrade^{C}	Europe	Qingtian County Public Security Bureau	na.	
SVK01	Slovakia	Bratislava^{C}	Europe	Qingtian County Public Security Bureau	na.	
ESP04	Spain	Barcelona	Europe	Fuzhou City Public Security Bureau	na.	
ESP05	Spain	Barcelona	Europe	Fuzhou City Public Security Bureau	na.	
ESP06	Spain	Barcelona	Europe	Qingtian County Public Security Bureau	na.	
ESP01	Spain	Madrid^{C}	Europe	Fuzhou City Public Security Bureau	na.	
ESP02	Spain	Madrid^{C}	Europe	Fuzhou City Public Security Bureau	na.	
ESP03	Spain	Madrid^{C}	Europe	Qingtian County Public Security Bureau	na.	
ESP07	Spain	Santiago de Compostela	Europe	Qingtian County Public Security Bureau	na.	
ESP08	Spain	Valencia	Europe	Fuzhou City Public Security Bureau	na.	
ESP09	Spain	Valencia	Europe	Qingtian County Public Security Bureau	na.	
SWE01	Sweden	Stockholm^{C}	Europe	Qingtian County Public Security Bureau	na.	
UKR01	Ukraine	Odesa	Europe	Qingtian County Public Security Bureau	na.	
GBR03	United Kingdom	Glasgow	Europe	Fuzhou City Public Security Bureau	na.	
GBR01	United Kingdom	London^{C} (Croydon)	Europe	Fuzhou City Public Security Bureau	na.	
GBR02	United Kingdom	London^{C} (49 Watford Way, Hendon)	Europe	Fuzhou City Public Security Bureau	na.	
CAN01	Canada	Toronto	North America	Fuzhou City Public Security Bureau	na.	
CAN02	Canada	Toronto	North America	Fuzhou City Public Security Bureau	na.	
CAN03	Canada	Toronto	North America	Fuzhou City Public Security Bureau	na.	
USA01	United States	New York	North America	Fuzhou City Public Security Bureau	na.	
ARG01	Argentina	Buenos Aires	South America	Fuzhou City Public Security Bureau	na.	
BRA01	Brazil	Rio de Janeiro	South America	Qingtian County Public Security Bureau	na.	
BRA02	Brazil	São Paulo	South America	Fuzhou City Public Security Bureau	na.	
CHL01	Chile	Viña del Mar	South America	Fuzhou City Public Security Bureau	na.	
ECU02	Ecuador	Guayaquil	South America	Qingtian County Public Security Bureau	na.	
ECU01	Ecuador	Quito^{C}	South America	Fuzhou City Public Security Bureau	na.	
AGO01	Angola	unknown city	Africa	Nantong City Public Security Bureau	na.	
ETH01	Ethiopia	unknown city	Africa	Nantong City Public Security Bureau	na.	
MDG01	Madagascar	Antananarivo^{C}	Africa	Nantong City Public Security Bureau	na.	
LSO01	Lesotho	Maseru^{C}	Africa	Fuzhou City Public Security Bureau	na.	
NGA01	Nigeria	Benin City	Africa	Fuzhou City Public Security Bureau	na.	
NGA02	Nigeria	unknown city	Africa	Nantong City Public Security Bureau	na.	
ZAF01	South Africa	Johannesburg	Africa	Fuzhou City Public Security Bureau	na.	
ZAF02	South Africa	Johannesburg	Africa	Wenzhou City Public Security Bureau	na.	
ZAF03	South Africa	unknown city	Africa	Nantong City Public Security Bureau	na.	
TZA01	Tanzania	Dar es Salaam	Africa	Qingtian County Public Security Bureau	na.	
ZMB01	Zambia	unknown city	Africa	Nantong City Public Security Bureau	2016–?	

== See also ==
- Chinese intelligence activity abroad
- Extraterritorial operation
- Long-arm jurisdiction
- Operation Fox Hunt and Operation Sky Net
- Black jails
- Black site
- One institution with two names
