= Transnational repression by Russia =

Efforts by the government of the Russian Federation to control its diaspora and exiles

Transnational repression by Russia refers to efforts by the Russian government to control its diaspora and exiles. Transnational repression targets former insiders and individuals perceived as threats to the government's security. The methods include assassination, manipulation of the Interpol notice system, and surveillance. Ramzan Kadyrov, head of Russia's Chechen Republic, conducts a total repression campaign against Chechen exiles. As of 2024, Russia has focused its repression on anti-war and other political activists as well as journalists, and is one of the biggest perpetrators of transnational repression in the world.

== Background ==
Freedom House has documented at least 854 direct, physical incidents of transnational repression globally from 2014 to 2022. 14 governments have used Interpol notices in detaining and deporting individuals. Russia accounted for 31% of such incidents. Russia's campaign heavily relies on assassination, targeting former insiders and individuals that the regime perceives as threats to its security. Assassinations made up one quarter of all acts of transnational repression conducted by the Russian government, while one-third of all assassinations globally were committed by Russia. According to a February 2026 report by the Montreal Institute for Global Security, Russia has engaged in transnational repression in Canada through a combination of intimidation, surveillance, cyber operations, and influence campaigns.

== Methods of repression ==
=== Assassination ===
In 2021, Freedom House reported 26 assassinations or attempted assassinations globally since 2014. The Russian transnational repression campaign accounted for seven of them. Additionally, Russia is also responsible for assaulting and detaining its nationals abroad as well as conducting renditions and unlawful deportations.

Freedom House found that the Kremlin tends to target individuals who possibly defected to member states of NATO and cooperated with those governments' intelligence agencies, ones considered to have been involved in armed conflict with Russia in the past, or those whose political or business activities conflict with the security services. It has demonstrated a willingness to take the life of perceived threats at least in Ukraine, Germany, Bulgaria, and the U.K.

Since the start of the Russian invasion of Ukraine, that list includes military defectors.

In September 2026, U.S. Justice Department charged members of a Russian intelligence network with plotting to kill Kremlin critics outside Russia. The indictment alleged that the network offered $40,000 to kill or "disappear" a Russian dissident in the United States and, in a separate 2025 plot, $25,000 to kill a Kremlin critic believed to be living in Lithuania.

=== Interpol notice ===
The Kremlin also harasses and detains its nationals in exile by manipulating and abusing the Interpol notice system. A significant case was its targeting of Bill Browder, a whistleblower who campaigned to sanction officials involved in Sergei Magnitsky’s murder, corruption, and human rights violations. He was placed on Interpol’s ‘wanted list’ by Russian authorities.

Russia is responsible for 38% of public Red Notices globally. Due to a lack of transparency at the Interpol, it is challenging to determine how the government is able to use this notice system to such an extensive degree. The government has also been able to use Interpol's Red Notices in detaining individuals who reside in the U.S. for extensive periods of time. Due to Red Notices from Russia, there have been asylum seekers who have spent over one year in ICE detention.

In 2021, governments in Russia, the People's Republic of China, Turkey, and Bahrain managed to have their nationals detained in Morocco, Poland, Serbia, Kenya, and Italy based on Red Notices. Most of these detained individuals are involved in political activism or civic activism.

=== Abuse of KYC/AML systems ===
Pavel Durov's meme reaction on his inclusion into Rosfinmonitoring terrorist registry posted on his Telegram in 2026

The Russian list of terrorists and extremists, managed by Rosfinmonitoring, is widely abused by the Russian government to designate individuals targeted with criminal cases on various charges of "terrorism" or "extremism". Historically, before 2022, the registry primarily consisted of militants associated with Islamic fundamentalism, many of whom remain listed. It later expanded to include Alexei Navalny’s Anti-Corruption Foundation, the opposition leader himself (who died in a Russian jail), and his closest associates. Since February 2022, the list has expanded at breakneck speed to encompass critics of the regime, growing even faster after the State Duma passed a law expanding the powers of Rosfinmonitoring in late 2024. As of 2025, the registry expands by 250–300 people per month. Minors account for every tenth person designated, a demographic proportion that began rapidly increasing in 2023. Notable individuals listed in the registry include Alexei Navalny, Kaja Kallas, Kyrylo Budanov, Ilya Yashin, Arsen Avakov, Oleksiy Honcharenko, Lindsey Graham, Pavel Durov and Mikhail Khodorkovsky, among others.

Being listed in the registry leads to the freeze of all assets in Russia, with the sole exception of allowing monthly withdrawals from bank accounts up to the minimum wage (27,093 rubles as of 2026).

When Rosfinmonitoring updates the list, the information is automatically passed on to specialized commercial companies that aggregate data on individuals and entities for KYC/AML (know your customer/anti-money laundering) systems used by financial institutions globally. The three pillars of this market—Dow Jones Risk & Compliance, LexisNexis, and World-Check—maintain databases containing politically exposed persons (PEPs), sanctioned individuals, and adverse media (negative mentions in official sources and media). Banks and other institutions rely on this data during due diligence for opening accounts, conducting mergers and acquisitions, executing investment deals, and handling other transactions. The process of inclusion is 95–99 percent automated, relying on algorithms that scan court rulings, news stories, and official websites. When an individual's status changes, financial institutions receive automated notifications that a client has been flagged in connection with terrorism, routinely prompting them to freeze transactions, demand additional documentation, or terminate the banking relationship. This automated pipeline triggers a global chain reaction, causing foreign banks and platforms to restrict listed individuals. For instance, in 2025, Telegram Wallet closed the cryptocurrency accounts of activists Daniil Chebykin and Lev Galyamin following their inclusion in the Russian registry.

Global compliance providers remain legally protected because they act as information aggregators rather than evaluators of political context; for example, providers accurately reported Belarusian dissident Dmitry Navosha as a designated "terrorist" by the Belarusian KGB without assessing whether the state prosecution was politically motivated. While compliance firms develop internal risk-profiling tools and artificial intelligence models in local languages, their operations lack external auditing or international regulation. To avoid compliance liability, financial institutions frequently opt for global de-risking—rejecting entire categories of clients rather than conducting individualized assessments. According to World Bank estimates, de-risking affected over 700 million people between 2015 and 2018, primarily in low- and middle-income countries, and continues despite the FATF revising its standards in 2023. Consequently, the financial and transactional costs of clearing a risk profile fall entirely on the individual, who must fund costly legal representation to interface with data providers and compliance departments. This is especially challenging for dissidents who flee Russia prior to sentencing, as their options are often limited to a complete change of legal identity, which is rarely possible for those holding only a Russian passport.

The international financial system currently lacks formal mechanisms to evaluate the weaponization or politicization of national terrorist registries. To mitigate this systemic abuse, analysts and human rights observers propose establishing quantitative red-flag indicators of state misconduct. Proponents suggest that metrics such as a government adding an anomalous number of individuals per month (e.g., 300 people) or designating a high percentage of minors (e.g., 10%) should serve as formal triggers, making it feasible for the FATF or independent monitoring bodies to track and flag countries that systematically weaponize financial compliance mechanisms against political dissent.

List of notable Russian Criminal Code articles used for inclusion

List of most notable Russian criminal code articles used for political reprisals for violation of which a person can be included into the registry:

- 205.2 - Justification of terrorism (Criminal article in Russia)
- 205.4 - Organization of a terrorist community and participation in it
- 205.5 - Organization of activities of a terrorist organization and participating in the activities of such an organization
- 207.3 - Dissemination of fakes about Russian army activity based on political, ideological, racial, national or religious hatred or enmity, or based on hatred or enmity towards any social group
- 213 - Hooliganism with extremist motives
- 280 - Public calls for extremist activity
- 280.1 - Public calls for actions aimed at violating the territorial integrity of the Russian Federation
- 280.3 - Repeated discreditation of the Russian armed forces
- 280.4 - Calls for implementation of activities directed against security of the state on grounds of political, ideological, racial, national or religious hatred or enmity, or on the grounds of hatred or enmity towards any social group
- 281 - Sabotage
- 281.1 - Assistance to sabotage activities
- 281.2 - Training for the purpose of carrying out sabotage activities
- 281.3 - Organization of a sabotage community and participation in it
- 282 - Incitement of hatred or enmity, as well as abasement of human dignity
- 282.1 - Organization of an extremist community
- 282.2 - Organization of the activities of an extremist organization
- 282.3 - Financing of extremist activity
- 282.4 - Repeated propaganda, public display, manufacturing, or sale of Nazi attributes or symbols, or symbols of extremist organizations
- Any other crimes committed on the grounds of political, ideological, racial, national or religious hatred or enmity, or on the grounds of hatred or enmity towards any social group (as specified in Article 63, Part 1, Item "e").

=== Surveillance and hacking ===
Russian nationals abroad who are high-profile critics of the government's politics are subjected to surveillance and hacking campaigns.

=== Russian communities abroad ===
The Kremlin also exerts control over Russian communities abroad, such as Russian cultural institutions, the Russian Orthodox Church, and Russian-language media. Since the Soviet Union's dissolution, the government again gained control over certain official cultural institutions that had a presence abroad. In 2006, under Vladimir Putin’s leadership, the Orthodox Church reunited with the Russian Orthodox Church Outside Russia, a church that emerged after the Russian Revolution. In 2008, the government launched Rossotrudnichestvo to "coordinate activities meant to facilitate engagement with the diaspora, as well as other formal 'soft power' activities," as reported by Freedom House.

=== Domestically focused ===
Unlike other governments that commit transnational repression, the Kremlin does not try to control the entirety of the Russian diaspora through coercion. It instead focuses on activism repression at home and controlling the information environment so that exiles are unable to reach domestic citizens. The government also will confiscate property, file spurious charges, and threaten colleagues or family members who remain in Russia. Indigenous activists have been a significant target for repression.

=== Campaign against Chechens ===
Unlike other Russian nationals, citizens from Russia's Chechen Republic (Chechnya) face a total transnational repression campaign. This campaign is directed by Ramzan Kadyrov, head of the Republic, with the approval of Russia's central government. Inside the republic, Kadyrov rules with terror and brutality to "ensure political stability." The regime is marked by torture, extrajudicial killings, anti-gay purges, murders of journalists, murders of human rights advocates, and enforced disappearances. Chechnya's authorities have subjected hundreds of citizens to such violence. As a result of such severe repression, tens of thousands of Chechen citizens fled the nation. Many of them seek asylum in European countries.

Kadyrov's repression follows Chechen exiles. This began when two assassinations took place in early 2009. Sulim Yamadayev, a former military commander, was assassinated in Dubai. Umar Israilov, a former bodyguard who exposed Kadyrov's brutality, was assassinated in Austria before he could testify in court. Chechen dissidents outside of Russia have then been "killed and attacked at alarming rates," as reported by Freedom House. Kadyrov has also publicly made his intent to control the diaspora clear.

== Notable cases ==
- In 2006, Alexander Litvinenko, a former intelligence officer, was killed via radiation poisoning. He was poisoned by radioactive polonium-210 and died three weeks later in London. Investigations discovered that he was poisoned by two Russian citizens who acted under the Federal Security Service's direction.
- In 2018, Sergei Skripal, a former intelligence officer, and his daughter Yulia were subjected to an attempted assassination where a nerve agent was involved.
- Journalist Galina Timchenko previously worked for a Russian newspaper and then an online media outlet, but was terminated after she published material regarding Russia's Crimea annexation. She then relocated to Latvia and cofounded online media outlet Meduza. Meduza was deemed an "undesirable organization" by Russia in 2023, which would subject anyone working with it to criminal prosecution. Since 2022, the outlet's office has been vandalized and subjected to digital attacks, and Timchenko's personal device has also been attacked.
- In 2025, Semyon Skrepetsky, a Russian opposition artist, painter, caricaturist, performance artist, musician, blogger and satirist was assassinated by a person of chechen origin in Biała Podlaska..

== Responses ==
- In 2021, Turkey arrested six individuals who had ties to the Russian government for preparing “armed actions targeting Chechen dissidents.”
- In March 2022, governments of Australia, Canada, New Zealand, the U.K., and the U.S. called upon Interpol to suspend the Russian state's access to the systems.
- In October 2021, the U.S. updated the licensing regulations of the Commerce Department, restricting the sale of hardware or software that allowed for spyware's use or its development to nations that engage in violations of human rights, including transnational repression, such as the Russian government.
- In March 2023, the Transnational Repression Policy Act was introduced by a group of bipartisan Senators.
- In 2022, the U.K. government established a Defending Democracy Taskforce. One of this Taskforce's goals was to address foreign states’ efforts to suppress free expression in the diaspora communities.
- To better trace and prosecute transnational repression, the FBI in the U.S. has adopted a definition of the term, and launched a website for victims to report such acts by foreign governments.
- In 2024, the United States sanctioned Russian officials for violations and abuses of human rights related to its war in Ukraine.

== See also ==
- Conspiracy against rights
- Extraterritorial operation
- Poisoning of Sergei and Yulia Skripal
- Suspicious deaths of notable Russians in 2022–2024
- Transnational repression
- Interpol § Abusive requests for Interpol arrests
