= Ethnic unity =

Ethnic unity may refer to:

- Ethnocentrism
- Law on Promoting Ethnic Unity and Progress
