= Ejlali =

Ejlali (Persian: اجلالی) is an Iranian surname. Notable people with the surname include:

- Ali Ejlali (born 1988), Iranian professional bodybuilder
- Babak Ejlali (born 1981), Iranian blogger, political dissident, and human rights activist
- Jamal Ejlali (1947–2025), Iranian actor
