= Manus (AI agent) =

Autonomous artificial intelligence agent

- Developers: Butterfly Effect Pte. Ltd. Xiao Hong
- Release: March 6, 2025; 20 months ago
- Stable release: Manus 2.0 / December 15, 2025; 11 months ago
- Type: AI agent
- License: Proprietary
- Website: manus.im

Manus (meaning hand in Latin) is an autonomous artificial intelligence agent developed by Butterfly Effect, a company founded in China and based in Singapore.

== History ==
=== Background and founding ===
Xiao founded Butterfly Effect in 2022, two months before the public launch of OpenAI's ChatGPT. The company maintained offices in Beijing and Wuhan and targeted markets outside China, primarily North America, Japan, and South Korea.

In 2023, Butterfly Effect released Monica, a ChatGPT-powered browser extension that aggregated multiple commercial large language models behind a single interface for translation, summarization, and writing assistance.

In 2024, ByteDance approached Butterfly Effect with an acquisition offer of approximately US$30 million, according to reporting by 36Kr. Xiao declined the offer.

Ji Yichao, born in 1992 and raised in Colorado and Beijing, joined Butterfly Effect as a co-founder of the Manus product and serves as the company's chief scientist. Known by the nickname "Peak," Ji studied computer science in Beijing, and while in high school created Mammoth Browser, a web browser application for Apple's iPhone. In 2012, he founded Peak Labs with backing from ZhenFund and HSG (then known as Sequoia China) and was named to Forbes China's 30 Under 30 ranking in 2012 and 2013.

Zhang Tao joined the founding team as product director. In October 2024, Butterfly Effect began developing Manus, drawing inspiration from the San Francisco-based AI coding tool Cursor. The product's name was taken from the Latin motto of the Massachusetts Institute of Technology, "Mens et Manus," meaning "mind and hand." Most of Butterfly Effect's researchers and engineers were based in China at the time, and Manus was designed for markets outside China because it relied on American AI models that were unavailable domestically.

=== Launch (March 2025) ===
Manus launched in invitation-only beta on March 6, 2025. The launch demo video, which depicted the agent autonomously completing tasks such as resume screening and stock analysis, drew more than one million views within twenty hours. Demand for invitation codes drove a secondary market in which codes were resold on Chinese platforms such as Xianyu and on social-media and e-commerce sites for prices reportedly between ¥50,000 and ¥100,000 (approximately US$7,000 to US$13,800 at the time), according to state-owned China Daily. The Wall Street Journal reported that codes were resold for more than US$1,000.

=== Funding ===
Earlier funding rounds for Butterfly Effect included a 2023 seed round led by ZhenFund and a Series A in November 2024 that brought in Sequoia China (now known as HSG) and Tencent. In April 2025, the company raised approximately US$75 million in a Series B round led by Benchmark, valuing the company at approximately US$500 million. Earlier investors including Tencent, HSG, and ZhenFund participated, alongside additional investors such as Wang Huiwen, a co-founder of Meituan, and Old Friendship Capital. As part of the Benchmark deal, Benchmark general partner Chetan Puttagunta joined the company's board.

Earlier in 2025, several local governments in China offered to invest in Manus. The founders declined the offers, citing concerns that domestic government ties could create scrutiny in Western markets and complicate the company's global business.

In May 2025, Semafor and other outlets reported that the U.S. Department of the Treasury had begun reviewing the Benchmark investment under the Outbound Investment Security Program (OISP). The OISP, which had taken effect on January 2, 2025, requires U.S. entities to notify the Treasury of investments in artificial intelligence and other sensitive technologies in "countries of concern," including China. According to people familiar with the inquiry, Benchmark's outside counsel had concluded that the investment fell outside the OISP requirements on the grounds that Manus did not train its own foundation models and that Butterfly Effect was incorporated in the Cayman Islands. After Manus moved its headquarters to Singapore, the U.S. Treasury Department review largely faded as a concern in Washington.

=== Relocation to Singapore (mid-2025) ===
Following the Series B round, Butterfly Effect relocated its headquarters from Wuhan and Beijing to Singapore. The three co-founders relocated in mid-2025, and a separate Singapore-based entity, also called Butterfly Effect, took over operation of the AI agent product in markets outside China. The original Beijing Butterfly Effect Technology continued to exist as a Chinese-registered company. Of approximately 120 China-based employees, around 40 core technical staff relocated to Singapore. The remainder were laid off. By late 2025, Manus had around 100 employees, primarily in Singapore. The company also closed its Chinese-language social media accounts, blocked access from mainland China, and shelved a planned Chinese version of the product that had been announced as a partnership with Alibaba's Qwen team.

In December 2025, the company reported that its revenue run rate had risen from approximately US$90 million in August to US$125 million.

=== Attempted acquisition by Meta Platforms ===
In December 2025, Meta announced that it would acquire Manus, the company behind the Manus AI agent. Meta did not disclose financial terms, but the deal was reportedly valued between US$2-3 billion. At the time Meta approached Manus, the company had been seeking a new fundraising round at a valuation of approximately US$2 billion.

Meta said it would continue to operate and sell the Manus service and integrate its technology into products, including Meta AI, while Manus said it would continue offering subscriptions through its own app and website and remain based in Singapore.

In January 2026, China's Ministry of Commerce announced that it would conduct an "evaluative investigation" into the acquisition alongside other relevant Chinese authorities to assess whether the deal complied with China's rules on export controls, technology transfer, and foreign investment. The Chinese government subsequently issued exit bans for Manus executives under scrutiny.

On April 27, 2026, Chinese National Development and Reform Commission blocked Meta's acquisition of Manus, requiring "the parties involved to withdraw the acquisition transaction". In response, Meta said the transaction had complied with applicable law and that the company anticipated "an appropriate resolution" to the inquiry. On June 15, however, Meta announced that it was officially cutting ties with Manus, citing Chinese regulators blocking the acquisition. On August 11, Manus announced it will operate as an independent company.
