= Operation Fox Hunt =

Chinese government covert global operation

Operation Fox Hunt (Chinese: 猎狐专项行动; pinyin: Liè Hú Zhuānxiàng Xíngdòng) is a global operation of the government of the People's Republic of China whose purported aim is to capture or harass political dissenters. It was launched in 2014 under the general secretaryship of Xi Jinping and focuses on repatriating wanted Chinese nationals from other countries. As of 2017, it has led to the arrest of over 40 individuals. Some Western governments and critics have accused the operation of targeting Chinese dissidents living abroad to stop their activism under the guise of returning corrupt Chinese nationals to the country to face criminal charges.

== History ==
Operation Fox Hunt was launched in June 2014. In the course of six months during 2015, it repatriated 680 people to China.

In 2015, it scored its first big success in Europe with the arrest and extradition of a woman surnamed Zhang from Italy. It was the first time a European country had extradited someone to China on accusations of financial crimes.

In March 2017, Ningxia investigators and Paris embassy personnel “successfully persuaded” fugitive Zheng Ning to come home, after he had lived in France for three years before his mysterious disappearance. Despite an extradition treaty between France and China, French officials were not informed of the repatriation, leading French intelligence to complain. Paul Charon, an expert on China at the French defense ministry's Institute for Strategic Research, said, “It also shows a bigger phenomenon: the hardening stance of the regime in Beijing, which dares to carry out these operations overseas and mock the sovereignty of other countries.”

In January 2024, the prosecutor general of the Supreme People's Procuratorate Ying Yong called on the country to develop "foreign related rule of law" and legal experts with expertise on foreign jurisdictions and legal systems in order to more effectively combat transnational anti-corruption, counterterrorism and cybercrime cases; indicating an increased focus on utilizing foreign judicial systems to pursue domestic corruption suspects which have fled abroad to evade prosecution.

=== Operation Skynet ===
We’re seeing the Chinese government resort to blackmail, threats of violence, stalking, and kidnappings. They’ve actually engaged criminal organizations in the U.S., offering them bounties in hopes of successfully taking targets back to China. China applies incredible pressure on the targets of those efforts, many of whom still have family back in China. Some, unaware the Party was after them, have traveled back to China for a visit, only to find themselves suddenly trapped, and prevented from leaving.

— Christopher A. Wray (January 31, 2022)

Announced in 2015, Operation Skynet is a parallel, simultaneous program designed to augment Operation Fox Hunt by restricting the financial flows of cadres who have fled overseas and by engaging in the recovery of corrupt proceeds. South China Morning Post reported that the program will "go further" than previous manhunts through the coordination of multiple government agencies to cut off the exfiltration of state and corrupt assets abroad.

According to reports by state media, the program was still active as of 2023, with long-time fugitive Guo Qigang "voluntarily" returning to China in July 2023 to face charges. The article in China Daily stated that Guo was the party secretary of the state-owned SDIC Power Corp and had engaged in "duty-related violations and crimes". The same article that former policewoman Guo Jiefang, "voluntarily returned to China and turned herself in". The article stated that Guo was a police officer of the Guangzhou Public Security Bureau's traffic department, who fled overseas in March 2000 after she was suspected of accepting bribes. The article stated that Guo was one of the 100 most wanted fugitives on the Interpol red list released by the CCDI as part of Operation Fox Hunt in 2015.

== Exit-bans ==
The Chinese Communist Party under Xi Jinping has pursued a policy of exit bans against dissidents, political activists, as well as family members of relatives and corruption suspects who have fled abroad, the rationale being to coerce fugitives who have fled overseas to return to China to face prosecution. Family members of suspects accused of corruption by Chinese authorities, particularly Chinese American citizens and other overseas Chinese nationals, are frequently stopped at airports without explanation and informed by China Immigration Inspection personnel that they are barred from leaving due to a member of their family being wanted on corruption, embezzlement, or other charges.

In August 2017, American citizen Daniel Hsu and Jodie Chen were prevented from exiting China, forcing their 16-year-old daughter to return to the United States alone. Hsu stated that he was being "effectively held hostage" to convince his father, Xu Weiming, to return to China from the United States to face embezzlement charges. In April 2019, Chen's exit ban was lifted after writing a petition to Chinese authorities pledging that she would convince her father-in-law to return to the United States, but Hsu remained under detention within China. In November 2021, Hsu's exit ban was lifted, and he was allowed to return home to the United States.

In November 2018, two Chinese American citizens, Victor and Cynthia Liu, were stopped by Chinese immigration authorities and prevented from leaving the country. Chinese authorities alleged that their father and former official at the state-owned Bank of Communications, Liu Changming, was wanted for embezzlement charges. The pair's mother and naturalized American citizen, Sandra Han, was also detained allegedly, in a black jail, by Chinese public security authorities. In September 2021, reporting by the South China Morning Post confirmed that exit bans against Victor and Cynthia had been lifted and the pair had been allowed to return home.

The lifting of exit bans against US citizens in China in 2021 came shortly after an agreement was reached between the United States and the Chinese government relating to the Meng Wanzhou extradition case, in which Meng, CFO of Huawei and daughter of its chief executive Ren Zhengfei, was arrested for wire fraud and breach of US sanctions against Iran in December 2018. In 2021, Meng was allowed to reach a deferred prosecution agreement in which she would affirm the accuracy of a statement of facts stating her actions amounted to a breach of US sanctions and fraud and agree not to commit other crimes or face prosecution, allowing her to maintain her initial plea of not guilty. The timing of lifting of the exit bans and release of what were effectively hostages raised suspicions in regard to whether a "deal" of sorts had taken place. White House press secretary Jen Psaki denied claims of a "prisoner swap", stating the Meng Wanzhou case was a "legal matter" overseen by independent prosecutors at the Department of Justice.

== Responses ==
=== Canada ===
The Canadian Security Intelligence Service (CSIS) told The Globe and Mail that China is using threats and intimidation against members of Canada's Chinese community that are akin to the tactics used in Operation Fox Hunt. CSIS said that “these tactics can also be used as cover for silencing dissent, pressuring political opponents and instilling a general fear of state power, no matter where a person is located.” According to Safeguard Defenders, kidnappings and other forms of coercion have been used to repatriate individuals.

=== United States ===
"Since 2014, Chinese General Secretary Xi Jinping has spearheaded a program known as "Fox Hunt." Now, China describes Fox Hunt as some kind of international anti-corruption campaign—it is not. Instead, Fox Hunt is a sweeping bid by General Secretary Xi to target Chinese nationals whom he sees as threats and who live outside China, across the world. We’re talking about political rivals, dissidents, and critics seeking to expose China’s extensive human rights violations.

Hundreds of the Fox Hunt victims that they target live right here in the United States, and many are American citizens or green card holders. The Chinese government wants to force them to return to China, and China’s tactics to accomplish that are shocking. For example, when it couldn’t locate one Fox Hunt target, the Chinese government sent an emissary to visit the target’s family here in the United States. The message they said to pass on? The target had two options: return to China promptly, or commit suicide. And what happens when Fox Hunt targets refuse to return to China? In the past, their family members both here in the United States and in China have been threatened and coerced, and those back in China have even been arrested for leverage."

— Christopher A. Wray (July 2020)

In 2015, the Obama administration protested the use of undercover intelligence agents as part of Operation Fox Hunt. In 2020, Federal Bureau of Investigation (FBI) Director Christopher A. Wray gave a speech at the Hudson Institute in New York, where he talked at length about Fox Hunt and said the purpose of Fox Hunt is political repression, not anti-corruption. According to Wray, targets are given the option of returning to China or committing suicide. Wray also asserted that targets of the operation were coerced into compliance through arrests of family members and friends back home in China who were used as leverage in order to exert psychological pressure against the targets. Wray said, "These are not the actions we would expect from a responsible nation-state. Instead, it’s more like something we’d expect from an organised criminal syndicate."

Baimadajie Angwang, a police officer for the New York City Police Department (NYPD), was arrested at gunpoint in September 2020 on federal charges of allegedly spying for China by infiltrating the Tibetan community. The former Marine spent six months in a federal detention center before he was freed on bail. Abruptly, federal prosecutors dropped the case against him in January 2021 without further explanation. In 2023, the NYPD ordered him to answer questions from internal investigators about the spying case, but Angwang, on the advice of his lawyers, declined because the department refused to provide documents that would have allowed them to prepare. In 2024, Angwang was fired from his job. This was an unusually harsh penalty, according to an administrative NYPD judge as well as Angwang's lawyer. In his decision letter, NYPD commissioner Edward Caban wrote that as the department is a paramilitary organization, failure to comply with the official questioning "undermines its ability to carry out its mission". Angwang plans to sue the NYPD.

In October 2020, five people were arrested by the FBI in relation to their participation in Operation Fox Hunt and charged with conspiring to act as illegal agents of the People's Republic of China (PRC) and conspiracy to commit interstate and international stalking. An additional three people, who are believed to have absconded to China, were charged with similar offenses.

In July 2021, a federal grand jury indicted nine individuals for acting and conspiring to act in the United States as illegal agents of the PRC and engaging and conspiring to engage in interstate and international stalking. Two of those nine were also charged with obstruction of justice and conspiracy to obstruct justice. Six of the nine had previously been indicted in the October 2020 case and in a May 2021 indictment; the July 2021 indictment superseded (replaced the previous indictment). The individuals are alleged to have surveilled, harassed, stalked, and coerced American residents to return to China, sometimes threatening family members if they failed to comply. The Justice Department accuses Tu Lan, a prosecutor of the Hanyang People's Procuratorate and one of the indicted, of directing the surveillance campaign and subsequent destruction of evidence to obstruct the American investigation into their activities. One of those targeted by the alleged conspirators is accused of having accepted bribes as a Chinese official.

In July 2022, a federal grand jury indicted a Chinese national, Sun Hoi Ying (aka Sun Haiying), and a current Department of Homeland Security agent for acting as agents of the Chinese government. The Department of Justice accused the two of engaging in transnational repression of US based dissidents to "silence, harass, discredit and spy on U.S -based residents for exercising their freedom of speech" In a superseding indictment unsealed on July 7, a grand jury charged Craig Miller, a current DHS agent, and former DHS agent Derrick Taylor, for destroying evidence and allegedly accessing confidential government databases to secure information in aid of repression of local dissidents.

In October 2022, the Justice Department unsealed charges concerning seven Chinese nationals, indicting them in an investigation related to Fox Hunt. Two were arrested in New York. The Chinese nationals were charged with surveillance and harassment in a campaign to coerce a US resident to return to China. In June 2023, three men were convicted of offenses that included stalking and conspiracy related to an operation against a former Chinese official living in New Jersey (these included American private investigator Michael McMahon and two Chinese citizens living in the U.S.: Zheng Congying and Zhu Yong).

In November 2024, Texas Governor Greg Abbott ordered the Texas Department of Public Safety to arrest those attempting to conduct influence operations to return dissidents to China.

In March 2025, a real estate businessman, Quanzhong An, was convicted in a U.S. federal court and sentenced to 20 months in prison for assisting with Operation Fox Hunt in the U.S.

== See also ==
- Anti-corruption campaign under Xi Jinping
- Chinese information operations and information warfare
- Chinese police overseas service stations
- Extraterritorial operation
- Hong Kong national security law
- Human rights in China
