= Operation Sky Net =

Chinese clandestine operation

Operation Sky Net, commonly known as Skynet (Simplified Chinese: 天网), is a clandestine operation of the Chinese Ministry of Public Security to apprehend Overseas Chinese it sees as fugitives guilty of financial crimes in mainland China. The initiative was launched in 2015 to investigate offshore companies and underground banks that transfer money abroad. It has reportedly been consolidated with Operation Fox Hunt (which was launched in 2014, a year before Operation Sky Net) and returned around 10,000 fugitives to China in the last decade, including political dissidents and activists.

In 2016 alone, Operation Sky Net repatriated 1,032 fugitives from over 70 countries and recovered CN¥ 2.4 billion. According to the Central Commission for Discipline Inspection, China has captured over 1,200 fugitives, including 140 Party members and government officials, and recovered CN¥ 2.91 billion (US$400 million) of embezzled funds in 2023.

== Activities ==
Human rights NGO Safeguard Defenders highlighted methods used in Operation Sky Net, including the detention of fugitives' relatives in mainland China, dispatching agents overseas to illegally intimidate the person in their overseas location, or kidnap them and return them to China. In some cases, authorities froze family assets or even threatened to take away their children.

In 2016, Operation Sky Net apprehended Yang Xiuzhu, one of China's most-wanted fugitives according to a post of a list of 100 suspects "wanted for economic crimes and said to be living abroad" published in April 2015. She was escorted by U.S. Immigration and Customs Enforcement officers to Beijing, where she was then turned over to Chinese authorities. In 2018, Jacky Cheung held concerts in the cities of mainland China. Police from many provinces repeatedly arrested detected fugitives in the concert after the concert was over. In July 2018, the Uyghur Human Rights Project documented 395 cases of Uyghurs being deported, extradited, or rendered back to China.

== Surveillance ==
The government also uses GIS mapping, image acquisition, and other technologies to monitor different areas of the country. It uses technologies such as facial recognition systems and artificial intelligence and is part of mainland China's large-scale surveillance system. In 2023, China was estimated to have a huge surveillance network of around 540–626 million surveillance cameras.

== See also ==
- Operation Fox Hunt
- Anti-corruption campaign under Xi Jinping
- Chinese intelligence activity abroad
- Chinese information operations and information warfare
- Extraterritorial jurisdiction
- Hong Kong national security law
- Human rights in China
- Ministry of Public Security (China)
- Ministry of State Security (China)
- Political offences in China
- Social Credit System
