= Law on Promoting Ethnic Unity and Progress =

Law in China

Law of the People's Republic of China on Promoting Ethnic Unity and Progress

National People's Congress
- Passed by: National People's Congress
- Passed: 12 March 2026
- Enacted: 1 July 2026
- Signed by: President Xi Jinping
- Signed: 12 March 2026

Legislative history
- Introduced by: Ethnic Affairs Committee
- First reading: 8–12 September 2025
- Second reading: 22–27 December 2025
- Third reading: 5–12 March 2026
- Voting summary: 2756 voted for; 3 voted against; 3 abstained
- Status: In force

Law on Promoting Ethnic Unity and Progress
- Simplified Chinese: 民族团结进步促进法
- Traditional Chinese: 民族團結進步促進法
Transcriptions
Standard Mandarin
- Hanyu Pinyin: Mínzú Tuánjié Jìnbù Cùjìnfǎ

The Law on Promoting Ethnic Unity and Progress is the People's Republic of China's (PRC) guiding legislation concerning ethnic minorities. The law was introduced by the National People's Congress (NPC)'s Ethnic Affairs Committee and submitted to the NPC on 8 September 2025. It was signed into law on 12 March 2026 and enacted on 1 July 2026. The law codifies CCP general secretary Xi Jinping's policies regarding the sinicization of ethnic minorities. The law has been widely criticized by scholars, the United Nations High Commissioner for Human Rights, multiple governments, former United Nations special rapporteurs, and human rights activists outside of China. The law's promotion of extraterritorial enforcement has been likened to transnational repression.

== Provisions ==
Chapters I and V lay out the organizational structure and overarching principles of ethnic governance. It affirms the Party's "comprehensive leadership" over efforts to advance ethnic unity and progress, and tasks the United Front Work Department and its National Ethnic Affairs Commission with the implementation of policies toward the country's non-Han ethnic minorities. It declares "a sense of community for the Chinese nation" to be "the foundation of ethnic unity" and tasks the whole of government and society to achieve these goals, mandating general obligations on a wide range of public and private actors such as public employees, mass organizations, enterprises, public-service institutions, industry groups, religious institutions, neighborhood committees, and the military.

Chapter II, titled "Building a Shared Spiritual Home", lays out the ideological characteristics of the law, requiring fostering identification with "the great motherland, the Chinese nation, Chinese culture, the Communist Party of China, and socialism with Chinese characteristics" through patriotic education, education in official historical narratives, publicity of "the fine Zhonghua traditional culture," and promotion of "Chinese cultural symbols and image of the Chinese nation". It also codifies the predominance of Standard Chinese (Putonghua) in public life, codifying the goal of having preschoolers become proficient in Putonghua and requires that Chinese characters be displayed more prominently than minority scripts if both must be used in public. It tasks the Ministry of Education and the National Ethnic Affairs Commission with developing textbooks regarding "the community of the Chinese nation" and requires all schools to integrate that concept into their curricula. It vows to support the standardization, digitization, and preservation of minority texts. It broadly requires media, internet service providers, families, among others, to promote the CCP's ethnic policy. Parents are required to guide their children to "love the Chinese Communist Party and the Chinese people."

Chapter III, titled "Facilitating Interactions, Interchanges, and Intermingling", promotes further ethnic integration. It obligates the government to support "inter-embedded community environments" so that ethnic minorities can "live, study, build, share, work, and enjoy together". For that goal, it requires local governments to "forge a strong sense of community for the Chinese nation" and promote integration in all aspects of urban planning and governance. It specifically directs them to implement policies to facilitate cross-regional population movement, employment, student enrollment, and teacher and youth exchanges. It also mandates authorities to support and shape volunteer services, cultural institutions (libraries, museums, etc.), the tourism industry, and modern technologies and online media. It mandates internet service providers to promptly stop the transmission of "information containing ethnic hatred, ethnic discrimination, or other content that undermines ethnic unity and progress."

Chapter IV, titled "Promoting Common Prosperity and Development", focuses on integrating border regions and those with significant ethnic minorities into national economic and security priorities, requiring economic and social policies to further advance ethnic integration and improve people's lives and build popular support, as well as help safeguard national unity and fight against separatism. Ethnic areas have a "mission and responsibility" to safeguard the nation's "border security, resource and energy security, food security, and ecological security". Per the law, relevant central and local authorities are to improve infrastructure connectivity, develop appropriate local industries and agriculture, equalize public services, and strengthen environmental protection. It also requires promoting "civic and moral development", mandating "transforming outdated customs and traditions" and "promoting a new culture of civility and progress". The law encourages marriages between Han Chinese and ethnic minorities. It bars anyone from blocking marriages on ethnic grounds.

Chapters V and VI concern the enforcement mechanisms of the law. It permits citizens to report conduct that "undermines ethnic unity and progress" and to lodge complaints against government agencies and employees who fail to discharge their obligations under the Law. Procuratorates may initiate public interest litigation when any such conduct also "undermines national interests or the public interest". It generally leaves penalties to be imposed under other applicable laws. It also asserts jurisdiction over foreign organizations and individuals that "commit acts targeting the PRC that undermine ethnic unity and progress or create ethnic division". The law empowers the state to pursue those outside of China perceived as undermining notions of ethnic unity.

== Legislative history ==
Following the dissolution of the Soviet Union, intellectuals and policymakers within China began to argue that the designation of ethnic minority groups could be a threat to the country. Violence in Xinjiang and Tibet was cited as evidence for this argument. Peking University professor Ma Rong argued that earlier Soviet-inspired Chinese Communist Party (CCP) policies had unwittingly created a "dual structure" of governance in which the representation and identity given to recognized ethnic groups would increase ethnocultural differences and create social conflict. He recommended new policies of ethnic fusion and assimilation. These proposals by Ma and others were controversial at the time, but they later became central to the general secretaryship of Xi Jinping. Xi has shifted state policy towards assimilation in what he calls the "grand minzu fusion" or "the coalescing of blood and minds."

The National People's Congress introduced the law Ethnic Affairs Committee and submitted it to the NPC on 8 September 2025. The fourth session of the 14th National People's Congress passed it on 12 March 2026 and President Xi Jinping signed it the same day. The law came into effect on 1 July 2026.

The law codifies the policies of Xi Jinping, general secretary of the Chinese Communist Party, regarding the country's ethnic minorities. It is one of the few Chinese laws to have a preamble, which calls China "a civilization with a history of over 5,000 years" that has forged "a unified multi-ethnic nation" under the Chinese Communist Party (CCP), which it states is "a community of common destiny bound by intertwined bloodlines, common beliefs, cultural similarities, economic interdependence, and close emotional ties" that has successfully preserved their civilization despite periods of foreign aggression after 1840. It says the CCP as the "vanguard of the Chinese people and the Zhonghua minzu" led all ethnic groups in achieving independence and equality and charted "a correct path with Chinese characteristics for addressing ethnic issues", which evolved into the CCP's "Important Thinking on Improving and Strengthening Ethnic Work" whose "main task" is to forge "a sense of community for the Chinese nation". It concludes by calling on all citizens and institutions, state and private, to fulfill their shared obligations to "forge a sense of community for the Chinese nation" and to develop that community.

== Responses ==
Commentary outside of China has centered on the law's promotion of a singular Han-centric Chinese identity at the expense of minorities' identities. Anthropologist Magnus Fiskesjö of Cornell University stated that the "law is consistent with a dramatic recent policy shift, to suppress the ethnic diversity formally recognised since 1949." According to Neil Thomas of Asia Society, the law expands "the legal basis for restricting religious, cultural and political activities among minority groups." According to historian Benno Weiner of Carnegie Mellon University, the law, if enforced, would mean that non-Han people could not express "any type of discontent without being accused of being essentially separatists or terrorists". James Leibold of La Trobe University stated that "[b]y folding ethnic affairs into national security, the law expands the scope for surveillance and intervention in domains previously treated as social or cultural."

Organizations and individuals outside the territory of the [PRC] who carry out acts that undermine national unity and progress or create national division against the [PRC] shall be held legally accountable in accordance with the law.

— Article 63 of the law

Many have raised concerns regarding Article 63, which covers the extraterritorial enforcement dimensions of the law. Yalkun Uluyol of Human Rights Watch stated, "[t]hat is what you call transnational repression." The United Nations High Commissioner for Human Rights Volker Türk stated that the law "could restrict freedom of religion and culture". Some have raised concerns that the law provides a basis to target supporters of Taiwanese independence regardless of jurisdiction. Others have stated that the law raises additional risks for foreign companies investing in China if they investigate forced labor or review supply chains. The legislation has been criticized for not specifying what activities would constitute violations.

In April 2026, a letter from the United Nations, signed by eight former special rapporteurs for human rights, stated that the law could violate at least 12 international human rights laws that China has ratified, including the International Covenant on Economic, Social and Cultural Rights (ICESCR), the Convention on the Rights of the Child (CRC), and the International Covenant on Civil and Political Rights (ICCPR).

On 30 April 2026, the European Parliament adopted a resolution, which condemns the law and warns that it "would intensify the systematic suppression of ethnic identities and further worsen relations between the European Union and Beijing". The Chinese government rejected the European Union's criticisms and defended the extraterritorial provisions of the law.

In June 2026, U.S. Senators Lindsey Graham and Sheldon Whitehouse asked China to revise its Law for Promoting Ethnic Unity and Progress. They said the law would increase efforts to assimilate Tibetans, Uyghurs, and other ethnic minorities and further limit their cultural, language, and religious rights.

In July 2026, Taiwanese president Lai Ching-te announced that his government would enact assistance and protection mechanisms for any Taiwanese citizen targeted. The following day, Tibetan activist Lobsang Palden (aka Lobga Rangzen) set himself on fire near the United Nations Headquarters in New York while holding a Tibetan national flag, in protest of the newly enacted law. He was later pronounced dead. The same month, the U.S. Senators Adam Schiff and John Curtis introduced the Stop Transnational Repression Act (STRA) to codify transnational repression in law and increase criminal penalties for it, partly in response to the Law on Promoting Ethnic Unity and Progress. The Tibetan Parliament-in-Exile also rejected the law and launched a campaign to bring attention to it. In August 2026, the Inter-Parliamentary Alliance on China (IPAC) condemned the law as a violation of basic human rights.

== See also ==
- Anti-Secession Law
- Ethnic groups in Chinese history
- List of ethnic groups in China
- Minzu (anthropology)
- Racism in China
- Unrecognized ethnic groups in China
