= Exit bans in China =

Exit bans are legal restrictions imposed by authorities in the People's Republic of China that prevent individuals, including Chinese nationals and foreign citizens, from leaving the country. These measures have become increasingly prevalent since 2018, with data from China's Supreme People's Court showing the number of individuals facing travel restrictions has grown annually. Exit bans are imposed without prior notification, with many individuals only discovering restrictions when attempting to leave at airports or border crossings. The restrictions are applied for various reasons, from criminal investigations to civil disputes, and increasingly serve as diplomatic leverage tools.

Nearly all of the 53,000 court-ordered exit bans issued in the most recent documented year involved civil cases, according to Supreme People's Court data. In 2024, the Dui Hua Foundation estimates between 30 and 40 US citizens are currently unable to leave China, though this figure is likely an underestimate. Exit bans have been applied to the family members of a person wanted by the authorities. In 2026, the legal basis for exit bans was further expanded.

== Legal framework and expansion ==
The legal basis for exit bans has significantly expanded in recent years. Between 2018 and 2022, Chinese laws authorizing exit bans increased from 10 to 14, according to human rights organization Safeguard Defenders. A key development was the 2018 amendment to the Supervision Law, which permits exit bans on anyone under investigation or connected to investigations, even non-suspects.

Exit bans can last months or years until legal processes conclude. They may be imposed in criminal investigations, civil and commercial disputes, national security cases, and investigations involving family members or employers. In 2026, China expanded the legal basis for exit bans on foreigners to include suspicion of moving supply chains away from the country.

== Recent high-profile cases ==
In July 2025, Chinese authorities blocked a US federal employee from the United States Patent and Trademark Office from departing China. The employee, visiting China personally, reportedly faced restrictions after visa application issues regarding government employment disclosure. This marked the first reported case affecting a US government employee.

The same month, authorities prevented Chenyue Mao, a Wells Fargo trade finance banker and US citizen, from leaving China. Chinese officials cited involvement in an unspecified criminal case. Wells Fargo subsequently suspended all employee travel to China.

Earlier precedent includes the 2019 case of American siblings Cynthia and Victor Liu, who were restricted from leaving for three years despite facing no personal charges. Their situation related to their father, a former bank official wanted on fraud charges in China.

== Impact and international concerns ==
The increasing use of exit bans has raised business confidence concerns. Affected individuals describe discovering restrictions through airport alerts, with those experiencing bans reporting significant psychological distress and uncertainty about resolution timeframes. Human rights concerns have been raised about exit bans being applied to the family members of a person wanted by Chinese authorities. Safeguard Defenders has likened exit bans in certain cases to a form of hostage diplomacy.

Cash-strapped local governments have expanded detention and fining practices against business executives, a phenomenon termed "long-range fishing." This has contributed to widespread apprehension that undermines investment messaging from Chinese policymakers.

The United States Department of State has confirmed active engagement with Chinese officials regarding affected cases. Multiple governments now specifically warn travelers about exit ban risks, including the UK, US, and Canada.

== See also ==
- Hostage diplomacy
