= Stop Transnational Repression Act of 2026 =

Proposed Act of Congress

Stop TNR Act of 2026
- Long title: To amend chapter 45 of title 18, United States Code, by providing for a sentencing enhancement for transnational repression committed against United States citizens or individuals who are physically present in the United States, and for other purposes.

Legislative history
- Introduced in the Senate by Adam Schiff on July 14, 2026; Committee consideration by United States Senate Committee on the Judiciary

The Stop Transnational Repression Act of 2026, or Stop TNR Act of 2026, is a proposed 2026 Act of Congress to create a federal definition for transnational repression and criminal penalties for threats and violence by nations against individuals outside their borders. The bill was introduced by Senators Adam Schiff and John Curtis.

== Background ==
The bill was drafted in response to China's Law on Promoting Ethnic Unity and Progress, which went into effect in July 2026 and which allows China to target critics abroad.

== Reaction ==
The bill was endorsed by the Uyghur Human Rights Project.
