= IndieChina Film Festival =

China-focused film festival

The IndieChina Film Festival was a planned Chinese language independent film festival scheduled to be held in New York City between November 8 to 15, 2025. The festival's inaugural event was cancelled following Chinese government pressure on directors, moderators, and volunteers to withdraw from the festival.

== Background ==
The IndieChina Film Festival was to show independently made Chinese films and was curated by Zhu Rikun, a Chinese filmmaker and previous co-founder of the Beijing Independent Film Festival. Zhu subsequently moved to New York City. Echo Xuedan Tang was another curator.

== History ==
Over 200 films were submitted to be screened at the 2025 festival, with 31 selected. Cui Zi'en was to be the tribute honoree.

Films selected included:

- Seafood (opening film)
- Butter Lamp

=== Cancellation ===
On November 5, the festival's curator Zhu Rikun announced on Facebook that he had to cancel 80% of the planned screenings as a result of filmmakers' withdrawals.

==== Reaction ====
Yalkun Uluyol, China researcher at Human Rights Watch, wrote that the festival's cancellation was an "act of transnational repression" in a statement published on November 6, 2025.
