= Amadnews =

Iranian news website

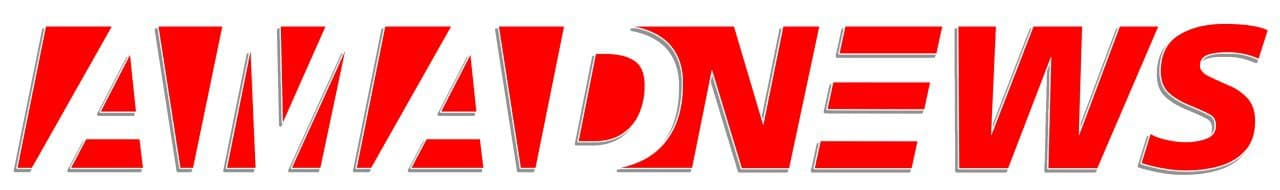
- Website type: News Agency
- Available in: Farsi
- Founder: Ruhollah Zam
- Website: amadnews.co
- Registration: Registered in France on 14 September 2019
- Launched: 2015

Amadnews is one of the politically active websites and news channels focused on Iran. "Amadnews" was introduced as an acronym for three words, Awareness, Struggle, and Democracy, and its operators described themselves as close to protest movements and popular currents and stated their goal as exposing and publishing behind-the-scenes news and information of the Iranian government. This media outlet claimed that it was able to deliver confidential news from various parts of the ruling establishment to its audience. The late Ruhollah Zam was one of the well-known and principal figures in the establishment and administration of this website.

The Amadnews Telegram channel was also one of the highly followed and news-making political channels. Its number of members surpassed 500,000 in August 2017 and reached approximately 600,000 by mid-October of the same year. In mid-December 2017 it exceeded 750,000 and by late December reached approximately 850,000. In late December 2017 the number of members also surpassed 1,400,000. This channel was blocked on 30 December 2017, simultaneously with the protests of 2017, due to encouragement of violence by Telegram.

Ruhollah Zam, using the alias Nima, removed several administrators who had not complied with the editorial rules of news reporting, Amadnews, and Telegram from managing the channel and appointed individuals such as his long-time friends, including Maziyar, as technical manager and content supervisor. After that, another channel under the name "Sedaye Mardom" continued its activity. Ruhollah Zam and Maziyar on 14 September 2019, together with a lawyer, registered Amad News under the name Amad News Agency in France.

== Whistleblowing ==
Some major stories reported by Amadnews include

- Report about personal bank accounts of Iranian Chief Justice
- Corruption in Astan Quds Razavi
- Saeed Toosi

== Telegram channel suspension ==
Following request by Iranian government Telegram suspended Amadnews for violence and advertising use of Cocktail Molotov against police during 2017–2018 Iranian protests. The channel was recreated under another ID "sedaiemardom".

== Admin arrest and execution ==
In October 2019 Ruhollah Zam was lured to Iraq by IRGC Intelligence, kidnapped and taken to Iran. He was executed December 2020. The IRGC took control of the Telegram channel.
