= Driving license in China =

Driving License of the People's Republic of China
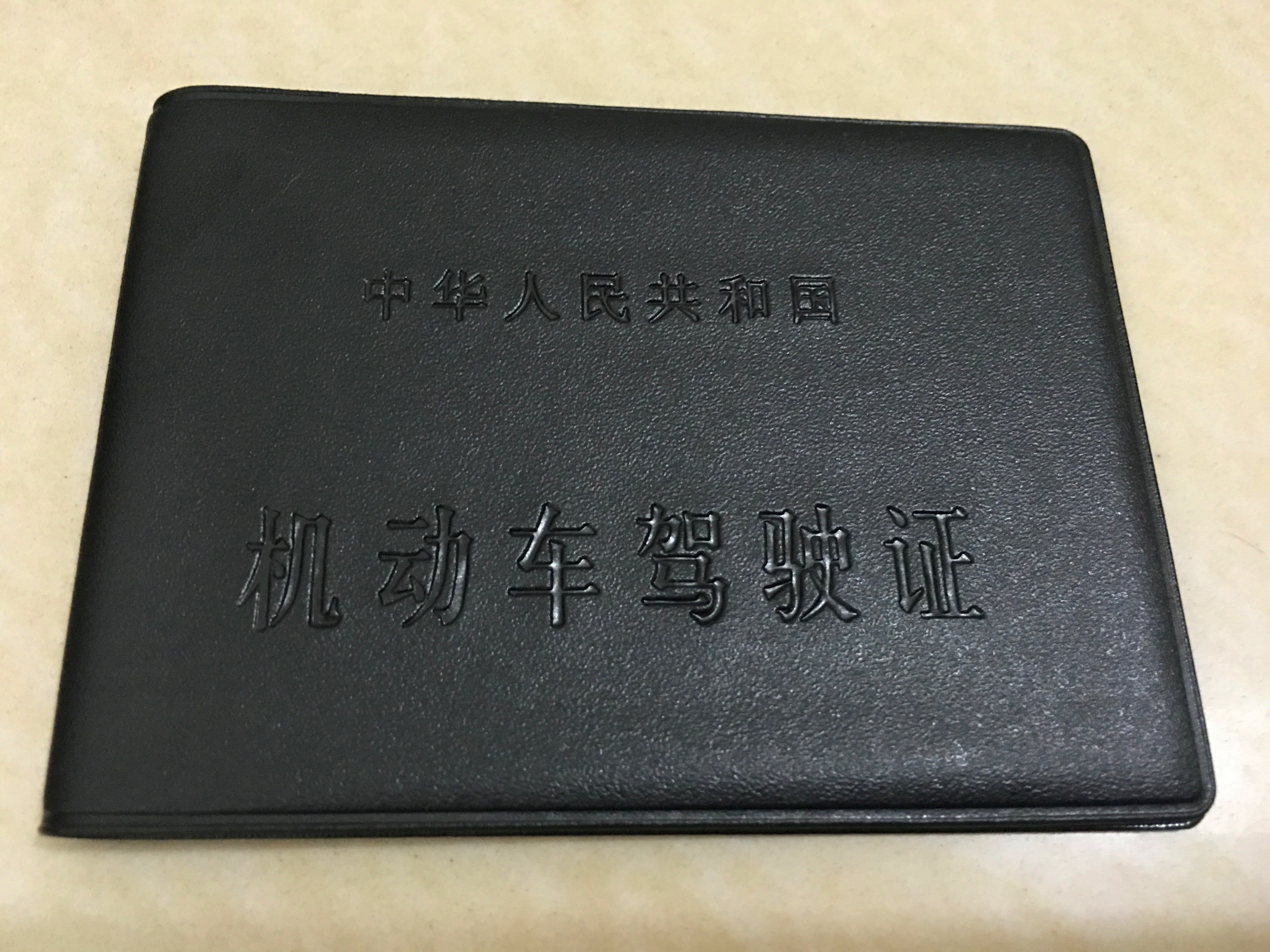
- Government-issued cover

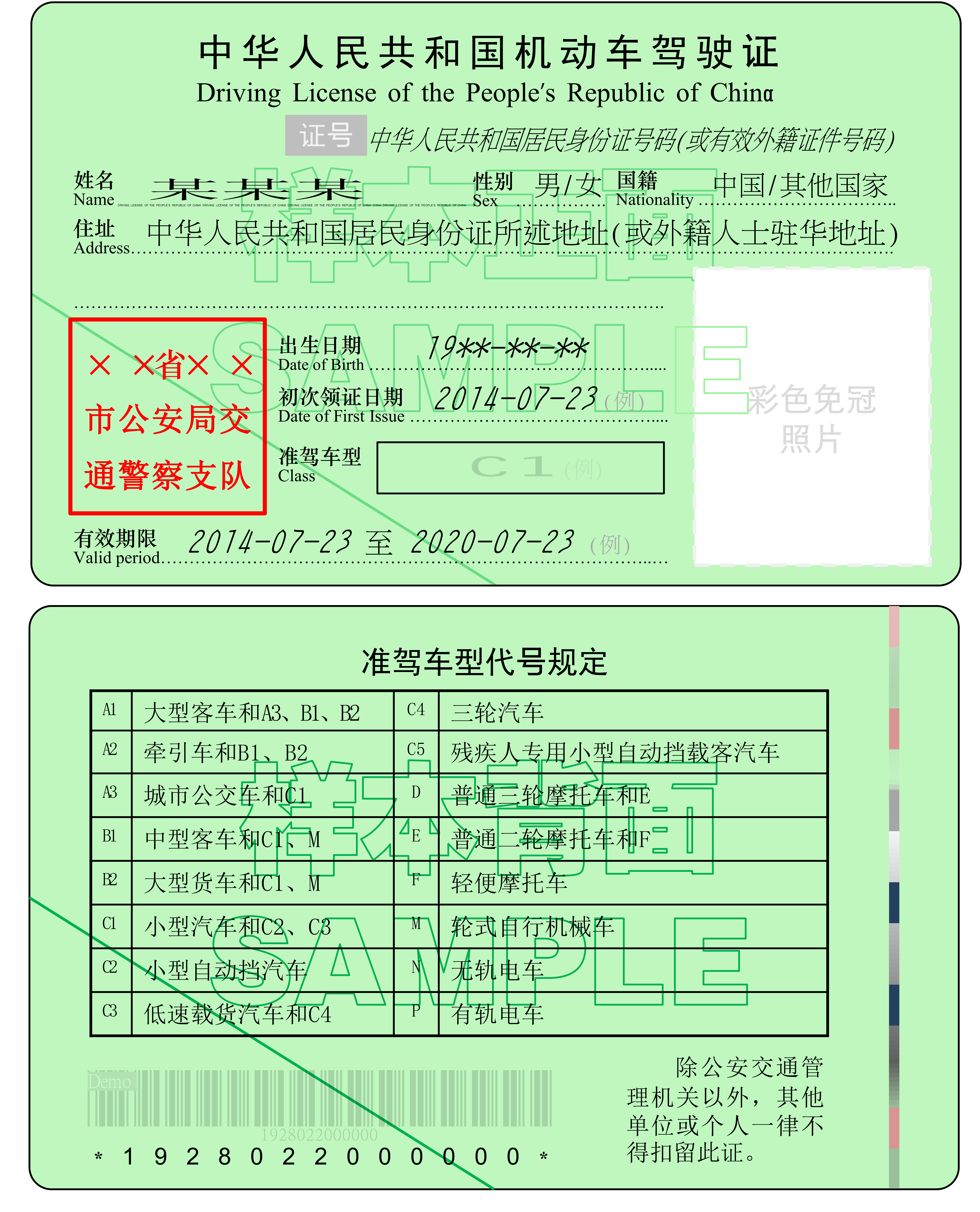
- Main page photo to be attached in the white area laminated in plastic envelope to be official
- Type: Driving license
- Issued by: Prefectural public security bureau
- Valid in: Mainland China
- Eligibility: At least 18 years old
- Expiration: 6 years, 10 years, or life-time
- Cost: 10 CNY

Driving license in China
- Simplified Chinese: 中华人民共和国机动车驾驶证
Transcriptions
Standard Mandarin
- Hanyu Pinyin: Zhōnghuá Rénmín Gònghéguó Jīdòngchē Jiàshǐzhèng
Yue: Cantonese
- Jyutping: zung1 waa4 jan4 man4 gung6 wo4 gwok3 gei1 dung6 ce1 gaa3 sai2 zing3

The Driving License of the People's Republic of China (Chinese: 中华人民共和国机动车驾驶证) is the legal driving license of the People's Republic of China. It is issued, ratified, and regularly inspected by the traffic administrative department of the public security organ. The minimum age varies from 18 for cars to 26 for large buses.

Learner's licenses, although granted, have little effect, as most training takes place within the confines of specially designed training areas inaccessible, on paper, to the general motoring public. Previously, expressways were inaccessible even for holders of a normal driver's license if their license was less than a year old. However, this restriction has now been removed. Drivers with licenses less than a year old, however, are still considered "intern drivers" or "new drivers" (Chinese: 实习司机; pinyin: shíxí siji), and certain limitations apply to them (for example, displaying a uniform label on the car when they are driving, or having a person with at least three years experience in the front passenger seat while on highways). The PRC considers the driving license, under a new law, an administrative license (Chinese: 行政许可; pinyin: xíngzhèng xǔkě).

The PRC is not a party to any of the three conventions regarding an International Driving Permit and therefore such licences are not valid in the country. Foreign drivers with a valid residence permit can apply for a Chinese driver's license, while visitors can obtain a temporary driving permit for the length of their stay (see below).

== History ==
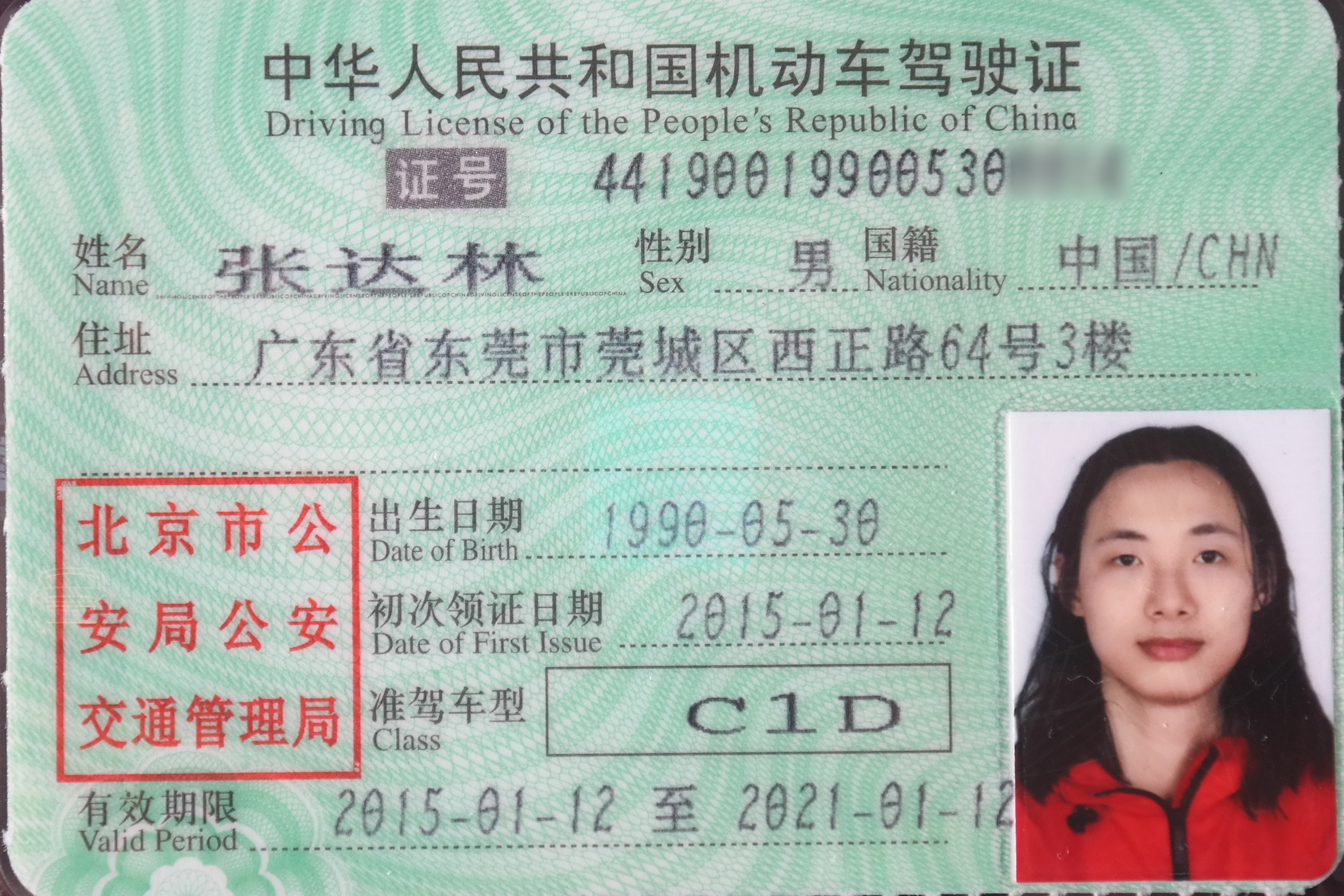
A driving license of China (Type C1D), issued in Beijing, with permanent residence in Guangdong

On April 10, 2019, the Ministry of Public Security announced that applications for light motor vehicles (Type C1, C2, and C5) are no longer required to provide proof of residence in the issuing region if their hukou is not in the region. Before that, anyone whose hukou is not in the issuing region must have a "temporary living permit" (暂住证 or 居住证) of the region or other similar proof in order to take a test and get a license (of any Type). In October 2020, the Ministry of Public Security said that obtaining a motorcycle driver's license (Type D, E, and F) will not require a hukou starting on 20 November 2020.

== Types of license ==
Examples of Classes of P.R.China Driving License

Type	Name	Chinese	Age of application	Other categories included	Intl. Eqs.
A1	Heavy passenger vehicles (20 passengers or more)	大型客车	26–50	A3, B1, B2, C1, C2, C3, C4, M	D
A2	Semi-trailer trucks or vehicles with a trailer with a total mass heavier than (but not equal to) 4500 kg	重型牵引挂车	24–50	B1, B2, C1, C2, C3, C4, C6, M	E
A3	City buses (10 passengers or more)	城市公交车	20–50	C1, C2, C3, C4	D
B1	Middle passenger vehicles (10-19 passengers)	中型客车	21–50	C1, C2, C3, C4, M	D1
B2	Heavy goods vehicles	大型货车	20–50	C1, C2, C3, C4, M	C
C1	Light motor vehicles, campers (9 passengers or less)	小型汽车	18+	C2, C3, C4	B
C2	Automatic transmission light motor vehicles	小型自动档汽车	18+		B
C3	Low-speed goods vehicles	低速载货汽车	18–60	C4	B
C4	Three-wheel motor vehicles	三轮汽车	18–60		B1
C5	Small passenger cars with automatic transmission for people with disabilities	残疾人专用小型自动挡载客汽车	18–70		N/A
C6	Vehicles with a trailer with a total mass (gcm/gcwr) less than (but not equal to) 4500 kg	轻型牵引挂车	20–60		BE
D	Ordinary three-wheel motorcycles (over 50cc / 50 km/h)	普通三轮摩托车	18–60	E, F	B1
E	Ordinary two-wheel motorcycles (over 50cc / 50 km/h)	普通二轮摩托车	18–60	F	A
F	Light motorcycles (50cc / 50 km/h or less)	轻便摩托车	18–70		A1
M	Wheel type automobiles	轮式自行机械车	18–60		N/A
N	Trolleybuses	无轨电车	20–50		N/A
P	Trams	有轨电车	20–50		N/A

== Foreign drivers ==
Mainland China does not recognise the International Driving Permit or a foreign driving licence on its own; an IDP can neither be used to drive nor to apply for a Chinese licence.

Foreigners visiting China for a short stay may apply to the traffic police for a temporary driving permit (临时驾驶许可) on the basis of a valid foreign licence, without a driving or theory test. The permit is valid for three months, and for stays of more than three months it can be extended to up to one year. It is limited to the vehicle categories on the applicant's foreign licence; for rented vehicles only small cars (C1) and small automatic cars (C2) are allowed. Applicants must be at least 18 years old, and those aged 70 or over must first pass a capacity test. The application requires the passport, the original foreign licence and, if the licence is not in Chinese, a translation certified by a notary or by the applicant's embassy or consulate. In Shanghai the permit is issued at the vehicle management offices and at counters in the terminals of Pudong and Hongqiao airports.

Foreign nationals holding a Chinese residence permit may apply for a regular Chinese driving licence on the basis of a valid foreign licence (excluding learner's, provisional and probationary licences); International Driving Permits are not accepted for this purpose.
