= Ruhollah Zam =

Iranian journalist and activist (1978–2020)

- Born: 27 July 1978; Ray, Iran
- Died: 12 December 2020 (aged 42); Tehran, Iran
- Other names: Nima
- Occupation: Journalist
- Known for: Operating Telegram channel Amadnews
- Criminal charges: Espionage; Mofsed-e-filarz
- Criminal penalty: Capital punishment by hanging
- Criminal status: Executed
- Spouse: Mahsa Razani
- Children: 2
- Parent: Mohammad Ali Zam (father)

Ruhollah Zam (Persian: روح‌الله زم, also Romanized as "Rouhollah Zam"; 27 July 1978 – 12 December 2020) was an Iranian activist and journalist. He founded the Telegram channel Amadnews in 2015, and played a high-profile role in the 2017–2018 Iranian protests, to which he devoted special coverage at the time. In June 2020, an Iran court found him guilty of "corruption on earth" for running a popular anti-government forum, which officials said had incited the 2017–2018 Iranian protests. He was sentenced to death by an Iranian court and was executed on 12 December 2020.

== Biography ==
Ruhollah Zam was born into a clerical family in Tehran in 1978. His father, Mohammad-Ali Zam, is a reformist who served in senior government positions in the 1980s and 1990s. Mohammad-Ali Zam chose the name "Rouhollah" for his son as he was a supporter of Rouhollah Khomeini, founder of the Islamic Republic in Iran, however, Rouhollah later asked his friends to call him Nima. Ruhollah Zam turned against the establishment after the 2009 Iranian presidential election protests, and was imprisoned in Evin Prison for some time. Zam eventually fled Iran to reside in France in 2011.

From 2005 to 2012, Ruhollah Zam, along with Robert Bruchim, an Iranian-Jewish journalist, made numerous documentaries about human rights in Iran. Zam and Bruchim also published the magazine "The Union's Message" about syndicalism in Tehran. This magazine was seized after Robert Bruchim was arrested and detained by the Islamic Revolutionary Guard Corps and sentenced to death by the Islamic Revolutionary Court.

He was best known for operating a Telegram channel named 'Amadnews' (or 'Sedaiemardom', lit. 'Voice of the People'), which he founded in 2015. Zam played a high-profile role in the 2017–18 Iranian protests, to which he devoted special coverage at the time. The Telegram channel's mission is "spreading awareness and seeking justice", and it has about 1.4 million followers. It provided the timing and organizational details of the protests as well as information about officials that challenged the Iranian government. After the Iranian government complained that the channel gave information about how to make gasoline bombs, Telegram shut down the channel in 2018, but it reappeared with a different name. Voice of America's Persian service frequently invited Zam on its broadcasts.

Zam was married to Mahsa Razani and had two daughters.

== Arrest ==
On 14 October 2019, Iran's Revolutionary Guard announced they had lured Zam back to Iran and arrested him, although according to other sources, he had been arrested in Iraq by intelligence officials, and handed over to Iran based on the extradition agreement between the two countries signed in 2011. The court hearing was held at the 15th branch of the Islamic Revolutionary Court in Tehran, presided over by Judge Abolqasem Salavati. Zam was sentenced to death according to the judiciary spokesman, Gholamhossein Esmaili, on 30 June 2020.

=== Accusations of French involvement ===
Shortly after Zam's arrest, the French newspaper Le Figaro accused the French government of involvement. Zam, who was living under police protection, discussed all his travel plans with French Police. Le Figaro implied that French police did not discourage Zam from traveling, as part of a prisoner swap agreement with Iran.

In November 2021 the Iranian Security official Akbar Khoshkooshak claimed France helped organize the arrest of Zam, in return for the release of a French undercover agent, captured by Shiite militia in Syria.

== Execution ==
Zam was executed by hanging on 12 December 2020. He was in Rejaei Shahr prison and was on a hunger strike at the time of execution. A number of state officials including the state prosecutor Amin Vaziri were present to watch his execution.

=== Reaction ===
Reporters Without Borders (RSF) condemned the execution and stated,

RSF is outraged at this new crime of Iranian justice and sees (Supreme Leader Ayatollah) @ali_khamenei as the mastermind of this execution.

The foreign ministry of France, where Zam was living in exile, stated,

France condemns in the strongest possible terms this serious breach of free expression and press freedom in Iran. This is a barbaric and unacceptable act that goes against the country's international commitments.

Amnesty International stated it was,

Shocked and horrified ... We call on the international community, including member states of the UN Human Rights Council and the EU, to take immediate action to pressure the Iranian authorities to halt their escalating use of the death penalty as a weapon of political repression.

As a response to the execution, ambassadors from France, Germany, Austria, and Italy cancelled their participation in the Europe-Iran Business Forum, an online business forum.

International Bar Association Human Rights Institute described it as a judicial murder.

In 2023, The documentary about Ruhollah Zam, Son of Mullah, was released. It follows the director, Nahid Persson Sarvestani, as she interviews and documents Zam during a year.

== See also ==
- Navid Afkari, a wrestler executed in 2020 for his alleged actions during the 2017–2018 Iranian protests
- Capital punishment in Iran
- List of foreign nationals detained in Iran
