= Transnational repression =

Efforts by a state to prevent dissent outside its borders

Transnational repression is a type of state-led political repression conducted across national borders, in which governments target individuals (often political dissidents or members of diaspora communities) through tactics such as surveillance, harassment, intimidation, assassinations, and enforced disappearances. Freedom House has documented its rise worldwide in recent years.

International relations scholar Laurie Brand asserts that autocracies face specific challenges and opportunities in the international sphere that affect authoritarian practices. Specifically, the rise of transnationalism and practices that transcend national borders have led autocracies to develop strategies aiming to manage their citizens' migration. According to the political scientist Gerasimos Tsourapas, global autocracies engage in complex strategies of transnational repression, legitimation, and co-optation, as well as cooperation with non-state actors. Countries with more robust democracies are much less likely to pursue transnational repression. Some of these countries have been criticized for not doing enough to protect foreign nationals living in their countries. Cooperation between countries has been more common when the two countries have had close economic ties.

The New York Times reported that the frequency of cases of transnational repression worldwide seems to be increasing as of 2024, due in part to some authoritarian governments responding to how globalization and the internet allow for more communication across countries. While this term is relatively new, such repressive actions have been documented for decades. According to reports by Freedom House, the People's Republic of China is responsible for about 22 percent of all cases of transnational repression since 2014, followed by Turkey, Russia, Tajikistan, Egypt, Turkmenistan, Cambodia, Iran, Uzbekistan and Belarus.

== Typology of transnational repression ==
Sociologist Dana M. Moss, who coined the term 'transnational repression' in 2016, categorized repression into six types:

| Lethal retribution | The actual or attempted assassinations of dissidents abroad by regime agents or proxies. |
| Threats | Verbal or written warnings directed to members of the diaspora, including the summoning of individuals by regime officials to their embassies for this purpose. |
| Surveillance | The gathering and sending of information about co-nationals to the state security apparatus by informant networks composed of regime agents, loyalists, and coerced individuals. |
| Exile | The direct and indirect banishment of dissidents from the home country, including when the threat of physical confinement and harm prevents activists from returning. |
| Withdrawing scholarships | The rescinding of students' state benefits for refusing to participate in regime-mandated actions or organizations abroad. |
| Proxy punishment | The harassment, physical confinement, and/or bodily harm of relatives in the home-country as a means of information-gathering and retribution against dissidents abroad. |

According to the UN High Commissioner for Human Rights, transnational repression can take place in multiple interconnected ways, leading to threats and actions against targets in foreign countries involving local actors or authorities in those locations. Prevalent tactics are:

- Acts of violence and intimidation outside the country
- Harassment through extradition requests, unlawful arrests or deportations
- Abuses of (security) laws with extraterritorial provisions
- Impediments to mobility
- Digital threats or attacks
- Proxy punishment of in-country relatives or associates

== History ==
=== Soviet Union ===
Bulgarian dissident writer Georgi Markov was assassinated on a London street via a micro-engineered pellet that might have contained ricin. Contemporary newspaper accounts reported that he had been stabbed in the leg with an umbrella delivering a poisoned pellet, wielded by someone associated with the Bulgarian Secret Service. Annabel Markov recalled her husband's view about the umbrella, telling the BBC's Panorama programme, in April 1979, "He felt a jab in his thigh. He looked around and there was a man behind him who'd apologized and dropped an umbrella. I got the impression as he told the story that the jab hadn't been inflicted by the umbrella but that the man had dropped the umbrella as cover to hide his face." It was reported after the fall of the Soviet Union that the Soviet KGB had assisted the Bulgarian Secret Service.

=== Chile ===
In 1976, Orlando Letelier was assassinated in a planted car bombing orchestrated in broad daylight within the US capital city of Washington, D.C. Letelier was an exiled former government official of Salvador Allende's democratically elected socialist government which had been ousted three years prior in the 1973 Chilean coup d'état. The murder was carried out by the military regime's secret police as part of its policy of targeting and silencing political opposition, with the intent of dearticulating potential resistance to the military order not just from within Chile but also from those nationals who might exercise and advocate for dissident pressure abroad. The assassination became one of many exemplary cases of the extensive violent political repression carried out by right-wing military juntas of South America during the Cold War under the umbrella of Operation Condor.

== Governments accused ==
By 2025, some 54 countries have been documented as committing transnational repression, according to Freedom House. The organization noted that it has become a more common practice worldwide and governments are collaborating to fuel repression. According to reports by Freedom House, China is responsible for about 22 percent of all cases of transnational repression, followed by Turkey, Russia, Tajikistan, Egypt, Turkmenistan, Cambodia, Iran, Uzbekistan, and Belarus.

A 2024 Human Rights Watch report documented 75 cases between 2009 and 2024, which were committed by more than two dozen governments, including Algeria, Bahrain, Belarus, Cambodia, Ethiopia, Kazakhstan, South Sudan, Thailand, Turkmenistan, and the UAE.

Countries with more robust democracies are much less likely to pursue transnational repression. Some have been criticised for not doing enough to protect foreign nationals or people of the diasporas living in their countries. Cooperation between countries was more common when the two countries had close economic ties. The Parliamentary Assembly of the Council of Europe passed a resolution on October 1, 2024, that defended Julian Assange for his 'journalistic work' and reiterated its condemnation of all forms and practices of transnational repression.

=== Belarus ===
During the United Nations Security Council briefing in October 2022 on the ICAO report about Belarus' diversion of Ryanair Flight 4978, after whose landing opposition activist and journalist Roman Protasevich and his girlfriend Sofia Sapega were arrested by Belarusian authorities, the United States ambassador to the UN for Special Political Affairs, Jeffrey DeLaurentis, described the act as a violation of international aviation law and of transnational repression. The United States Mission to the Organization for Security and Co-operation in Europe further delivered a statement on behalf of its country, as well as Canada and the United Kingdom, describing the diversion as "a blatant act of transnational repression".

=== China ===
The Center for American Progress reported in 2022 that some of the most notable transnational repression efforts of the government of the People's Republic of China, such as the Causeway Bay Books disappearances, have been coordinated by the Ministry of Public Security (MPS). The report called for initiatives to better understand the MPS's activities overseas.

In July 2023, the United States Department of State classified the Hong Kong Police Force's bounties on eight prominent dissidents living abroad as an instance of "transnational repression efforts".

In April 2023, the United States Department of Justice indicted Chinese operatives for crimes related to a transnational repression campaign using a Chinese police overseas service station in Manhattan. Following the indictments, the FBI described seeing an "inflection point in the tactics and tools and the level of risk and the level of threat" in transnational repression.

In March 2022, United States Secretary of State Antony Blinken characterized the Chinese government's attempts to silence Uyghur activists outside its borders as part of a campaign of transnational repression. A 2023 report published by the University of Sheffield called for increased use of Magnitsky legislation in response to the transnational repression of the Uyghur diaspora. This repression has increased in 2024 according to some Uyghur exiles.

In 2023, The Washington Post reported that China supported violent counterprotestors who attempted to silence criticism of General Secretary of the Chinese Communist Party Xi Jinping at the APEC United States 2023 summit in San Francisco. The Index on Censorship has described the Chinese Communist Party and the Chinese government's attempts to censor artist Badiucao's overseas exhibitions as an example of transnational repression.

As of 2024, Chinese students studying abroad who engaged in political activism against the regime faced harassment and retribution directly or through family members living in China. In 2019, a student was jailed for six months when he returned to China over tweets he had posted while studying at the University of Minnesota in the US; a Chinese district court held that the tweets "defaced the image of the country's leaders" and sentenced the student "for provocation".

In February 2025, Thailand deported 40 male Uyghur asylum seekers back to China. While other countries offered resettlement, Thailand confirmed that sending the Uyghurs elsewhere could risk retaliation from China.

In 2026, a report by the Montreal Institute for Genocide and Human Rights Studies documented instances of transnational repression linked to China in Canada, including intimidation, surveillance, and digital harassment targeting individuals and organizations.

In March 2026, U.S.-based Uyghur activist Abdulhakim Idris was detained and deported by Malaysian authorities under alleged Chinese pressure, illustrating Beijing’s global campaign of transnational repression. In 2025, Freedom House identified China as the leading perpetrator, targeting dissidents and minority activists abroad through detention, surveillance, and coercion via third countries.

On April 24, 2026, ARTICLE 19 reported that 19 activists in Kazakhstan were convicted for peaceful protests against human rights abuses in China's Xinjiang region, following what appeared to be diplomatic pressure from Beijing. The prosecutions, including prison sentences for 11 activists, highlighted China's influence over Kazakh authorities and raised concerns about transnational repression, the suppression of dissent, and the curtailment of civil liberties in response to criticism of China's policies.

=== Egypt ===
A report by Mohamed Soltan's nonprofit Freedom Initiative stated that Egypt has become "... more innovative and emboldened" in carrying out acts of transnational repression. Actions include targeting dissidents in the United States.

=== India ===
In 2023, the Sikh Coalition wrote to the United States government to warn about Indian transnational repression and rising Hindu nationalist threats in the US in the aftermath of the killing in Canada of Hardeep Singh Nijjar, a Canadian citizen. The Canadian government is investigating what it said were 'credible allegations of a potential link' in Nijjar's death to the Indian government.

=== Iran ===
From 2022-2026, over two hundred assassination plots have been documented targeting dissidents abroad by Iran's government, nearly twice as many as occurred in the period from 1979-2021. Many of the plots involve contracting with local criminals who may or may not be aware of the purpose of the surveillance or intimidation or violence. The increase has been a burden on investigators and courts in democracies who are also tracking and countering threats from other authoritarian regimes like Russia and China as well.

On 9 November 2023, former European Parliament Vice-president Alejo Vidal-Quadras was shot in the face in Madrid, Spain, an attack that he survived. Iran was suspected to be related to the assassination attempt and the attack has been described as an act of transnational repression, including by the European Parliament. A United States Treasury Department press release declared that: "The [Ministry of Intelligence and Security] and Iran's Islamic Revolutionary Guard Corps (IRGC) have long targeted perceived regime opponents in acts of transnational repression outside of Iran, a practice that the regime has accelerated in recent years." Freedom House also included journalist Masih Alinejad's kidnapping plan among Iran's transnational repression tactics.

Iran threatens journalists living abroad who are critical of the Iranian regime. In 2024 Iranian operatives stabbed Pouria Zeraati, this was interpreted by The Atlantic as a warning and threat to other Iranian journalists. Iran also considers London based, Iranian opposition linked news media such as Iran International as a terrorist organization. In 2022, wanted: dead or alive posters with the faces of four Iran International journalists were published by a major Iranian news agency. In 2018, Syria's Bashar Al Assad, an Iranian ally, plotted to kill Sima Sabet, an Iranian BBC journalist, and Fardad Farahzad, an anchor in Iran International.

The Anglo-American author Salman Rushdie, critical of the Iranian regime, suffered an attempted assassination in 2022 which is said to have been prompted by a fatwa by Ruhollah Khomeini, former Supreme Leader of Iran, and a 1989 Iran $3.3 million bounty for him. The Atlantic reported that Iran has kidnapped several of its targets. According to the US State Department, the Islamic republic has attempted 360 assassinations. Iran has targeted political leaders, activists and journalists. Iran also attempted to bomb an opposition gathering in Europe. Pro democracy activist Ruhollah Zam was kidnapped by Iran and later executed.

The United States passed the Masih Alinejad HUNT Act in 2021, which sanctions people sent by Iran to harass human rights activists. Masih Alinejad, an Iranian human rights activist who opposes compulsory hijab, has been the target of multiple assassination plots and a kidnapping attempt by the regime.

=== Russia ===
As of 2024, Russia has focused its repression on anti-war and other political activists as well as journalists; it ranks among the most active perpetrators of transnational repression in the world. Russia has a history of transnational repression that was documented in the Tsarist regimes.

=== Saudi Arabia ===
A report by Mohamed Soltan's nonprofit Freedom Initiative stated that, like Egypt, Saudi Arabia has become "... more innovative and emboldened" in carrying out acts of transnational repression. As of 2024, The Guardian reported Saudi Arabia as one of the major perpetrators of transnational repression in the world.

=== Taiwan ===
In July 2026, Taiwan's Ministry of Justice Investigation Bureau announced that it would prosecute two executives for local firm Abigail executive’s Li Hualun and Chen Mengsen after searches at the company's offices. Investigators said they gave messaging accounts to a China-linked hacking group, breaking Taiwan's data protection laws. The group allegedly used the accounts to pretend to work for the International Consortium of Investigative Journalists to target Taiwanese officials, scholars, NGO workers, and Uyghur, Tibetan, Hong Kong, and Taiwanese activists.

=== Turkey ===
In June 2023, the Parliamentary Assembly of the Council of Europe stated that Turkey's failure to ratify Sweden's NATO membership bid is part of its campaign of transnational repression. It called upon Turkey to end its intimidation of exiled journalist Bülent Keneş and to both recognise and respect the Swedish Supreme Court's decision not to extradite him.

=== United Arab Emirates ===
The Egyptian-Turkish poet Abdulrahman Al-Qaradawi has been detained in Abu Dhabi since January 2025 despite having no criminal record in or legal ties to the UAE. Al-Qaradawi had been living in exile since 2014 due to his and his father's dissident views against the Egyptian government, and remained critical of multiple Arab governments while abroad. Al-Qaradawi was detained at the Lebanese border with Syria and flown to the UAE, prompting statements of concern from Amnesty International, Human Rights Watch and PEN International.

=== Others ===
J. D. Tuccille described the forced grounding of Evo Morales' plane in 2013 on suspicion that it was transporting whistleblower Edward Snowden as an example of transnational repression by "even nominally free countries".

Azerbaijan, El Salvador, Equatorial Guinea, Eritrea, Israel, Kyrgyzstan, Nicaragua, Pakistan, Rwanda, and Tajikistan have been alleged to have engaged in transnational repression.

== Responses ==
=== Canada ===
In August 2025, Canada announced that it would appoint its first foreign interference commissioner to strengthen the country's capacity to respond to transnational repression.

=== United States ===
In December 2021, the US passed the Transnational Repression Accountability and Prevention (TRAP) Act as part of the National Defense Authorization Act for Fiscal Year 2022. The law aims to combat abuse of Interpol notices through increase in funding for Interpol to scrutinize Red Notices and mandates the U.S. government to produce reports on practices within Interpol.

In March 2023, a bipartisan group of United States senators introduced the Transnational Repression Policy Act. The proposed law would mandate that the intelligence community identify and share information about perpetrators of transnational repression operating in the United States. In October 2023, the Government Accountability Office reported that the US does not have adequate laws to combat acts of transnational repression. In May 2025, Texas governor Greg Abbott signed SB 1349 by Senator Bryan Hughes a first in the Nation legislation creating a criminal offense for transnational repression. In July 2026, prompted by China's Law on Promoting Ethnic Unity and Progress, the Senators Adam Schiff and John Curtis introduced the Stop Transnational Repression Act (STRA) to codify transnational repression in law and increase criminal penalties for it.

=== European Union ===
In June 2023, the Parliamentary Assembly of the Council of Europe recognised that transnational repression is a growing concern that undermines the rule of law and human rights in Europe. In June 2026, the European Parliament voted to adopt a report calling on the EU and member states to commit to a “zero-tolerance” approach to transnational repression.

== See also ==
- Conspiracy against rights
- Extraordinary rendition
- Extraterritorial abduction
- Extraterritorial jurisdiction
- Extraterritorial operation
- Interpol § Abusive requests for Interpol arrests
- Long-arm jurisdiction
- Political violence
