= Babak Ejlali =

Iranian political prisoner

Babak Ejlali بابک اجلالی

Babak Ejlali (Persian: بابک اجلالی) is an Iranian blogger, political dissident, editor of Rahsanews.com and human rights activist.

== See also ==
- Hossein Ronaghi
- Youcef Nadarkhani
- Reza Pahlavi
