= Safeguard Defenders =

Human rights organization based in Spain

- Formation: 2019
- Founder: Peter Dahlin; Michael Caster
- Founded at: Madrid, Spain
- Type: Nonprofit, NGO
- VAT ID no.: G88426192
- Legal status: Foundation
- Purpose: Human rights activism
- Location: Madrid, Spain
- Website: safeguarddefenders.com
- Formerly called: China Action

Safeguard Defenders is a not-for profit human rights organization that monitors disappearances in China. Co-founded by Michael Caster and Peter Dahlin in June 2019 in Madrid, Spain, it operates as a private foundation.

== History ==
In 2009, activists Peter Dahlin and Michael Caster, from Sweden and the United States respectively, founded China Action, a non-governmental organization (NGO) with a mission of promoting human rights in China. After some years of low profile activity, the foundation was re-established in Madrid under the name Safeguard Defenders, with a wider scope of work spanning across Asia while being specialized in documenting and combatting transnational repression by China.

== Research ==
In October 2022, Safeguard Defenders published a report on China's Ministry of Public Security's clandestine police stations around the world.

== Reception ==
In November 2022, NewsGuard reported that a pro-Chinese government disinformation campaign on Twitter had been launched against Safeguard Defenders. Employees of Safeguard Defenders have also been targeted with anonymous deepfake pornography.

== See also ==
- Forced confession
