= Extraterritorial operation =

Law enforcement or military operation conducted within a foreign country

An extraterritorial operation in international law is a law enforcement or military operation that takes place outside the territory or jurisdiction of the state whose forces are conducting the operation, generally within the territory of another sovereign state. Under international law, these activities are generally highly restricted, and it is considered a violation of a state's sovereignty if any other state engages in law enforcement or military operations within another state without gaining that state's consent.

== Background ==
The first and foremost restriction imposed by international law on a State is that—failing the existence of a permissive rule to the contrary—it may not exercise its power in any form in the territory of another State.

— Permanent Court of International Justice, 1923

== Law enforcement ==
The policing of transnational and international crimes is a challenge to state-based law enforcement agencies, as jurisdiction restricts the direct intervention a state's agencies can legally take in another state's jurisdiction, with even basic law enforcement activities such as arrest and detention are "tantamount to abduction" when carried out extraterritorially. These explicit limits on extraterritorial law enforcement operations has therefore instead encouraged co-operation between law enforcement agencies of sovereign states, forming supranational agencies such as Interpol to encourage co-operation, and placing additional obligations on the state such as aut dedere aut judicare ("extradite or prosecute") to compel prosecution of certain types of transnational crime, including hijacking of civilian aircraft, taking of civilian hostages, and other acts of terrorism, as well as crimes against diplomats and other "internationally protected persons".

== Military operations ==
While extraterritorial law enforcement activity is highly restricted and subject to the approval of the 'host' state, traditional interstate military operations assume some degree of extraterritorial operation. As Stigall points out, innate in 'just' war (jus ad bellum) is the expectation that one state may be conducting military activity against, and within the borders, of another state; the laws of armed conflict "[presuppose] extraterritoriality". Therefore, "[i]f the circumstances exist for the lawful use of force under jus ad bellum, then so long as a state abides by the rules articulated in jus in bello [the law of war], that state’s extraterritorial actions are considered lawful."

=== "Unwilling or unable" ===
Problems with the legitimacy of extraterritorial operations arise, according to Stigall, when one state is conducting military activity against non-state actors in a state "that is not party to the conflict". Although some commentators suggest that the use of force is permitted in some of these cases, with Deeks' commentary on the 'Unwilling or Unable Test' mentioning sources that recommend that "neutrality law permits a belligerent to use force on a neutral state’s territory if the neutral state is unable or unwilling to prevent violations of its neutrality by another belligerent", Stigall reminds "that such view is not universal, and textual authority for such cross-border attacks is limited".

=== Humanitarian and human rights law ===
For the Council of Europe, key tenets of its human rights law jurisdiction are laid down in Article 1 of the European Convention on Human Rights (ECHR), with the convention employed to complement and reinforce the more specific scope of humanitarian law. (Note: "This should be enough to dispel the assumption that, wherever human rights treaties such as the ECHR apply extra-territorially in situations of armed conflict and occupation, their effect could be curtailed by the more limited humanitarian law protection.") The application of this to extraterritorial operations has been noted by Ryngaert as mixed, with Al-Skeini and others v United Kingdom in 2011 attempting "to square Bankovic [v. Belgium's 'sufficient control' model of jurisdiction] with the personal model of jurisdiction", and Al-Jedda v United Kingdom "tried to reconcile the 'ultimate control and authority' standard ... with the 'effective operational control' standard endorsed by the UN's International Law Commission." Ryngaert declares each of the two results to be "an awkward hybrid theory".

== See also ==
- Extraterritoriality
- Extraterritorial jurisdiction
- Interpol
- Transnational repression

== Notes and references ==
=== References ===
- Deeks, Ashley S. (2012). ""Unwilling or Unable": Toward a Normative Framework for Extraterritorial Self-Defense" (PDF). Virginia Journal of International Law. 52 (3): 483–550. Archived from the original (PDF) on 2017-05-18.
- Holcroft-Emmess, Natasha (24 June 2013). "Extraterritorial Jurisdiction under the ECHR – Smith (and Others) v MOD (2013)". Oxford Human Rights Hub.
- Orakhelashvili, Alexander (2012). "Human Rights Protection During Extra-Territorial Military Operations: Perspectives at International and English Law". In White, N.; Henderson, C. (eds.). Research Handbook on Conflict and Security Law. Edward Elgar. SSRN 2042635.
- Ryngaert, Cedric (2012). "Clarifying the Extraterritorial Application of the European Convention on Human Rights (Al-Skeini v the United Kingdom)". Merkourios. 28 (74): 57–60. doi:10.5334/ujiel.ba.
- Stigall, Dan E. (3 February 2013). "Ungoverned Spaces, Transnational Crime, and the Prohibition on Extraterritorial Enforcement Jurisdiction in International Law". Notre Dame Journal of International & Comparative Law. SSRN 2211219.
