= State Security Police =

Chinese secret police

People's Police of State Security Organs 国家安全机关人民警察 Guójiā Ānquán Jīguān Rénmín Jǐngchá
- Flag of the People's Police
- Common name: State Security Police
- Abbreviation: SSP

Agency overview
- Formed: 1983; 43 years ago

Jurisdictional structure
- National agency: China
- Operations jurisdiction: China
- General nature: Secret police

Operational structure
- Headquarters: Yidongyuan, Beijing, China
- Elected officer responsible: Chen Yixin, Minister of State Security
- Parent agency: Ministry of State Security

The People's Police of State Security Organs (Note: 国家安全机关人民警察; Guójiā Ānquán Jīguān Rénmín Jǐngchá), informally known as the State Security Police (SSP) (Note: 国安警; Guó'ān ju) is the secret police component of China's Ministry of State Security (MSS). The organization is concerned with internal security, counterintelligence, and mitigating subversion of the unified state power of the Chinese Communist Party. It maintains expansive authorities to conduct warrantless searches and detention. It is one of the primary organizations responsible for suppression of political dissent and the administration of China's internet censorship system. Though branded with the People's Police name, the State Security Police are operated entirely separately by intelligence officers of the MSS.

The agency is best known for its invitations to tea, a summons and interrogation issued for minor instances of dissent aimed at intimidating and deterring Chinese citizens from further unapproved behavior. Further enforcement actions can escalate to secret trials, and lengthy sentences in the agency's own secret prisons which a United Nations Working Group has described as "tantamount to enforced disappearance."

The SSP should not be confused with the Political Security Protection Bureau of the Ministry of Public Security, despite sometimes similar duties and overlapping missions.

== History ==
Established in 1983, the SSP has a presence in every province, autonomous region, and direct-administered municipality in China, as well as an increased presence in coastal areas and some municipalities with heavy contact with foreign countries.

== Authorities ==
As a component of the Ministry of State Security, the State Security Police have broad authorities with little oversight. Chapter 1 of the Criminal Law of the People's Republic of China lists twelve core crimes which the agency is authorized to enforce:

1. Treason
2. Separatism
3. Inciting separatism
4. Armed rebellion and riot
5. Subversion of state power
6. Inciting subversion of state power
7. Financing criminal activities endangering national security
8. Defection
9. Defection to the enemy
10. Espionage
11. Providing intelligence to foreign organizations
12. Crimes of financing enemies

Of the twelve, inciting subversion of state power is the justification most frequently used to clamp down on dissidents. The SSP is also tasked with the security of the Belt and Road Initiative, carrying out internet censorship, and in 2024 was given the authority to conduct warrantless searches of electronic devices.

== Enforcement ==
Those arrested by the State Security Police can be subject to secret trials and may find themselves jailed in a State Security Bureau Detention Center, special purpose prisons operated by several major municipal branches of the MSS, as well as Residential Surveillance at a Designated Location (RSDL) enforced disappearance facilities, psychiatric hospitals, and other black jails.

In recent years, State Security charges have brought consistently higher average sentences in Chinese courts. According to the U.S. government's human rights watchdog Congressional Executive Commission on China, "authorities sentenced 1,422 prisoners of conscience between 2019 and 2024, with a six-year average prison term, which increased to a seven-year average if the case involved state security charges."

== Activities ==
=== Internet censorship ===
The State Security Police are tasked with much of the active topic-based censorship of China's internet and are embedded within the organization of every major Chinese tech company. Tencent, owner of China's leading social media app WeChat, has at least one floor of its Shenzhen headquarters "exclusively reserved for internet inspectors composed of state security police, national security staff, and online censors."

=== Warrantless searches of electronics ===
Under new authorities introduced in 2024, officers of the State Security Police can stop people and search their devices without the need for a warrant, or even an ongoing criminal investigation.
