= Beijing State Security Bureau Detention Center =

Political prison in Beijing

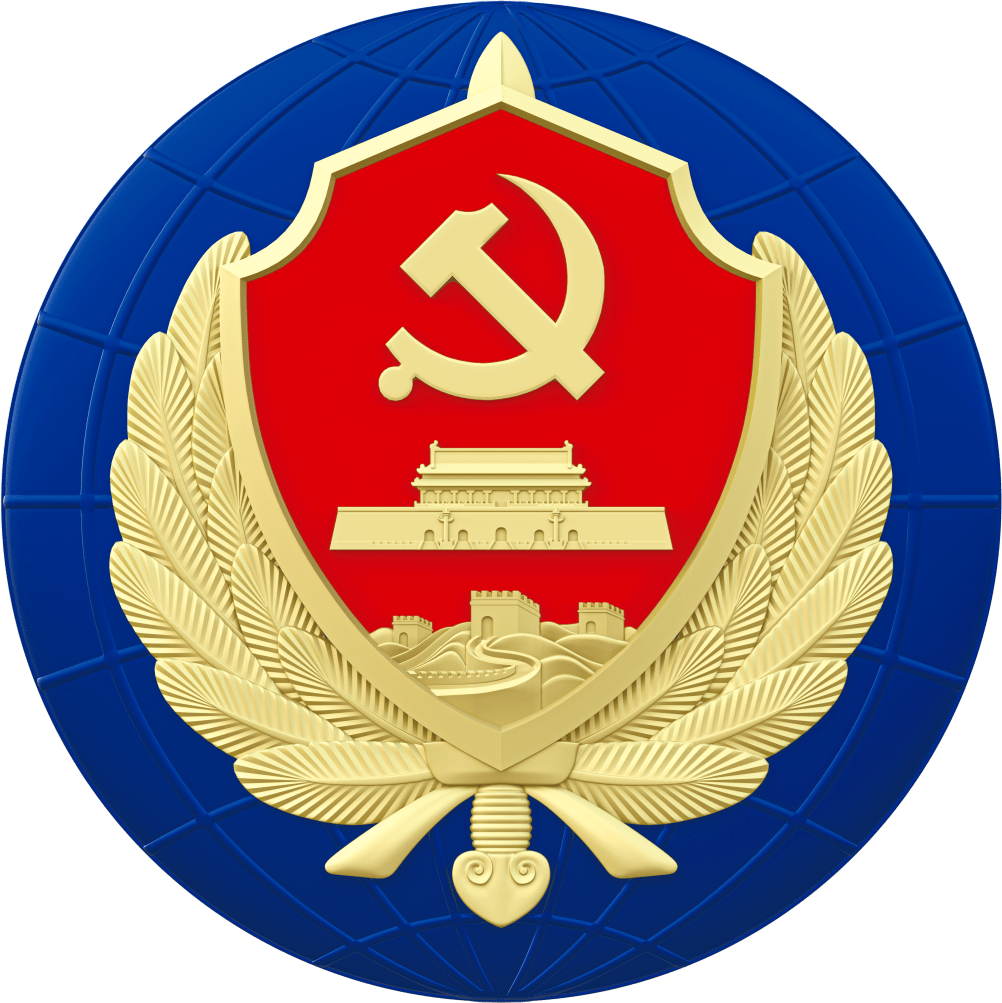
- Seal of the Ministry of State Security
- Interactive map of Beijing State Security Bureau; Detention Center
- Location: No. 47 Dahongmen South Road, Fengtai District, Beijing, China; 39.809978°N 116.384225°E
- Status: Operational
- Security class: Detention center
- Former name: Beijing International Prison
- Managed by: Beijing State Security Bureau of the Ministry of State Security

The Beijing State Security Bureau Detention Center (Note: It is often written as "centre" in British English translations) (BSSBDC; Chinese: 北京市国安局看守所) is a prison located in Fengtai, Beijing, China. The facility houses politically sensitive inmates: political prisoners, foreigners, disgraced Communist Party officials, individuals charged with crimes relating to state security, and allegedly, prisoners of conscience. The detention center is operated by the Beijing State Security Bureau (BSSB), the Beijing branch of the Ministry of State Security (MSS), China's foreign intelligence agency and secret police.

The facility, once known as the Beijing International Prison (Chinese: 北京市国际监狱) is comparable in function to Russia's Lefortovo Prison in Moscow, housing politically sensitive prisoners in proximity to the national capital.

== Prisoner demographics ==
The BSSBDC houses politically sensitive prisoners, including, according to the Oriental Daily News, disgraced former high-ranking Chinese Communist Party (CCP) officials. Members of the Falun Gong movement allege the BSSB has repeatedly detained their followers in the facility. Many journalists jailed for their reporting in China have spent time in the BSSBDC. According to the Committee to Protect Journalists, in 2023, China ranked as the "worst jailer of journalists" globally.

Some prisoners have been moved to the BSSBDC after serving time in a BSSB black jail of the Residential Surveillance at a Designated Location (RSDL) program, an extrajudicial regime of secret detention which facilitates the "disappearing" of individuals – often foreigners – charged with endangering state security.

== Notable inmates ==
Name(s)	Case details	Date of arrest
Gao Yu	Prominent Chinese journalist, sentenced to six years in prison on November 10, 1994, for "illegally providing state secrets to institutions outside [China's] borders" in a series of four articles in Overseas Chinese Daily. While held in the BSSB Detention Center, she was awarded the 1997 UNESCO World Press Freedom Prize. In the years since her release, she repeatedly served additional sentences handed down by Beijing courts.	2 October 1993
Xiao Biguang	Chinese dissident involved in the Beijing Protestant Christian community who helped file a lawsuit on behalf of the Jesus Family, a Chinese Pentecostal group. Arrested on a blank warrant, he was belatedly charged with "swindling" after authorities discovered the ID card issued by his employer listed the wrong academic degree. Xiao spent pre-trial detention in the BSSBDC with no outside contact beyond a single one-hour meeting with his lawyer.	12 April 1994
Xu Wei & Jin Haike	Xu, a reporter; and Jin, a geologist and writer; and two others were sentenced to ten years on charges of inciting subversion of state power for their involvement in a study group discussing political reforms in a case that made global headlines. According to Reuters, by 2009 both had been transferred to other facilities after Xu reportedly developed mental illness and Jin contracted a debilitating intestinal disease.	13 March 2001
Yang Jianli	Chinese-American Mathematician and dissident who was jailed and later sentenced to death on charges of espionage and illegal entry upon arriving in China in defiance of an entry ban issued by the government for his involvement in the Tiananmen Square protests. On May 28, 2003, a United Nations working group on arbitrary detention ruled that Yang's detention constituted a violation of international law.	April 2002
Wang Xiaoning	Chinese engineer and dissident who served to ten years in prison for inciting subversion of state power for publishing pro-democracy material online using his Yahoo! account after the company provided Chinese authorities information used to identify him. Held in the BSSBDC from the time of his arrest in September 2002 until May 2004.	September 2002
Zhao Yan	Chinese investigative journalist for the New York Times Beijing bureau. He was arrested 17 September 2004, on charges of fraud and revealing state secrets. He was released on 15 September 2007 after being found guilty of fraud but not of revealing state secrets. He is believed to be the first person to be acquitted of charges of revealing state secrets in China.	15 September 2007
Yang Hengjun	Chinese-Australian novelist and businessman, and one-time MSS officer who was arrested during a visit to China and given a death sentence with reprieve on charges of espionage in February 2024. He was moved to the BSSBDC after being subject to Residential Surveillance at a Designated Location (RSDL) in a black jail of the BSSB. Held in the BSSB during the COVID-19 pandemic with no outside contact.	19 January 2019
Haze Fan	Chinese reporter for Bloomberg News' Beijing bureau, arrested for reporting during the height of the COVID-19 pandemic. Released 14 June 2022.	7 December 2020

== See also ==
- Qincheng Prison – the Ministry of Public Security's facility for political prisoners in Beijing.
