= Public security bureau (China) =

Police department in the People's Republic of China

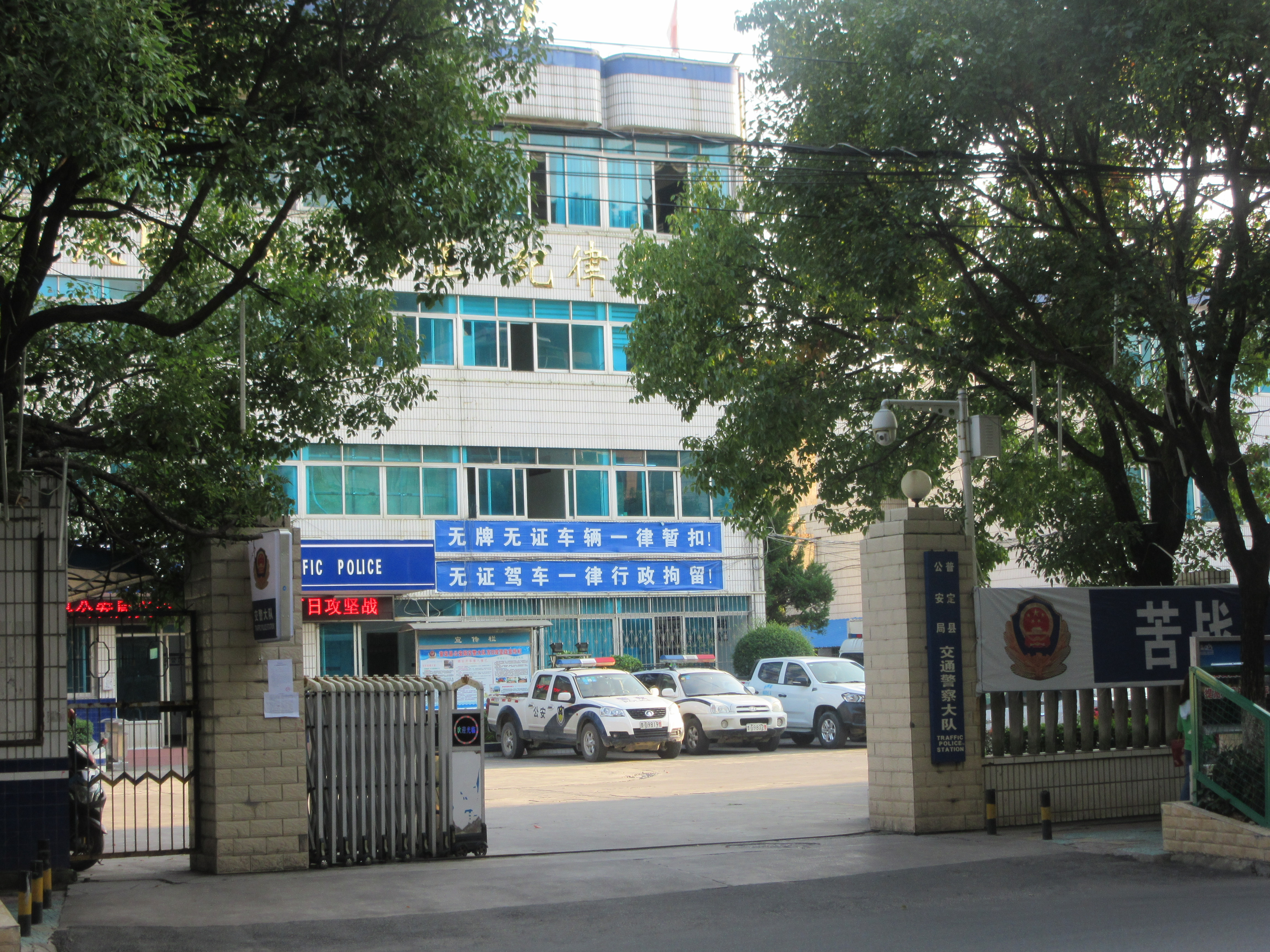
Puding County Public Security Bureau Traffic Police team

A public security bureau (PSB; Chinese: 公安局; pinyin: gōng'ānjú) of a city or county, or public security department (PSD; Chinese: 公安厅; pinyin: Gōng'āntīng) in a province or autonomous region of the People's Republic of China is a generic term for a police department.

== Duties ==
According to the State Council, the official duties of public security bureaus are:

- Preventing, stopping and investigating criminal activities
- Preventing and responding to terrorism
- Protecting public order and safety
- Managing Traffic, firefighting and dangerous goods
- Managing hukou and immigration
- Border protection
- Protection of VIPs and important locations
- Managing protests
- Prevention of cybercrime

== Organization ==
Public security bureaus and public security departments act as the main civilian police agency of their city or province, respectively. Under public security bureaus are police stations (Chinese: 派出所; pinyin: pàichūsuǒ).

The chief of a provincial public security department is also typically a deputy provincial governor.

The system of public security bureaus is administered by the Ministry of Public Security (MPS), which co-ordinates the work of provincial public security departments that are also answerable to the local governments and provincial party secretaries.

Each province/autonomous region has a public security department, while each municipality (Including directly administered municipalities like Beijing or Tianjin) has a public security bureau. Counties and county level cities also have smaller PSBs. Districts have branches(Chinese: 公安分局; pinyin: Gōng'ān fèn jú), also known as subbureaus, in contrast to counties and county level cities.

The PSB system does not apply to the special administrative regions of Macau and Hong Kong, as they have their own police forces, the Hong Kong Police Force and the Public Security Police Force of Macau, respectively.

=== Internal organization ===
Units of a PSB vary from agency to agency, though most bureaus have a traffic police unit, a SWAT unit, a crime investigation unit, a legal affairs unit, a food safety and environmental crime unit, a detention center/jail and a public order unit, though functions of each unit also vary, For example, in the Daishan County PSB, the Public Order unit is also in charge of food safety, while in the Shenzhen Municipal PSB there is a separate unit for Food Safety and environmental crime.

Some PSBs also operate overseas service stations.

== Specialized Public Security Bureaus ==
=== Railway Public Security Bureaus ===
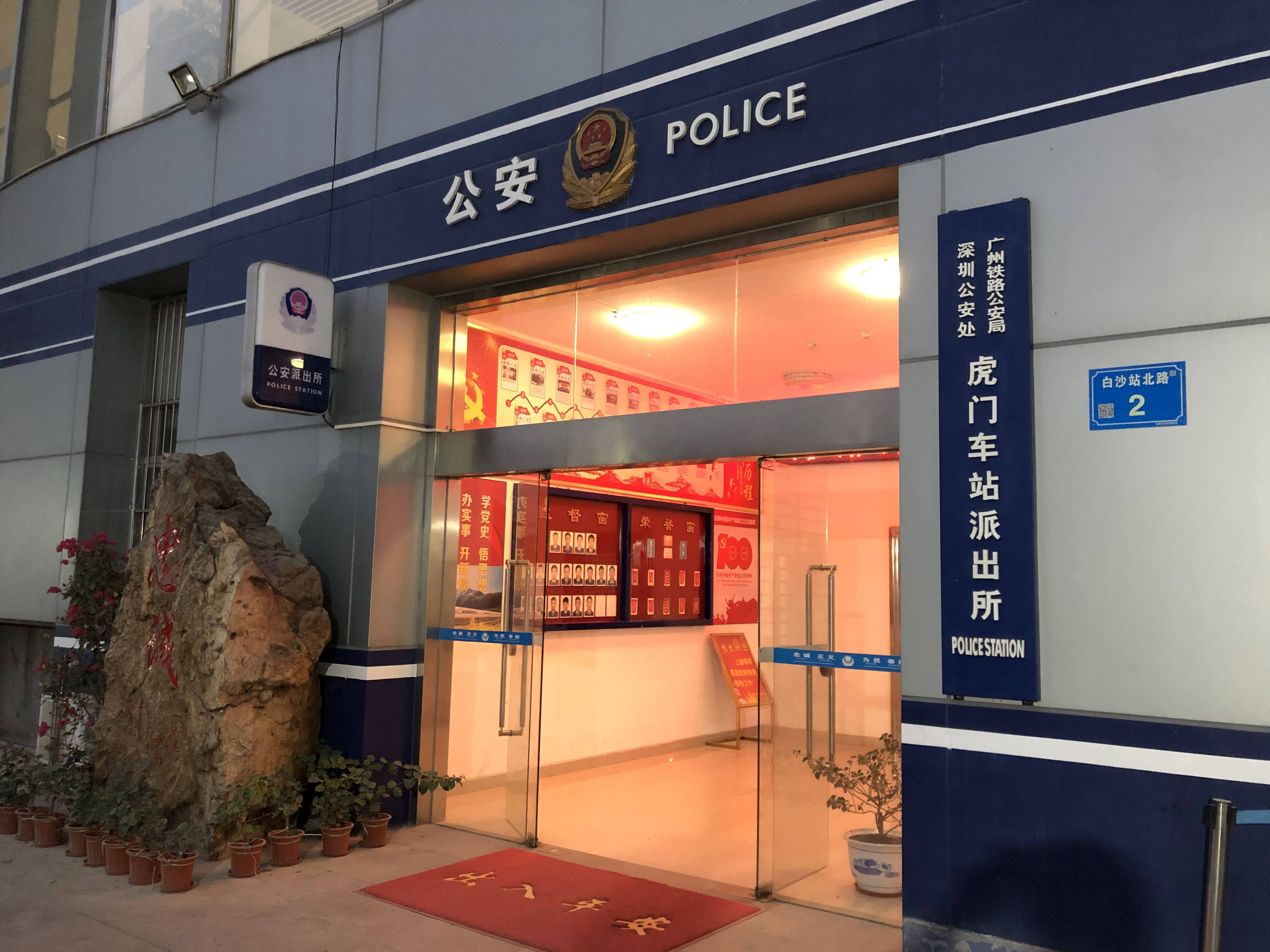
Humen railway station Police Station, Subordinate to the Shenzhen Railway Public Security Division

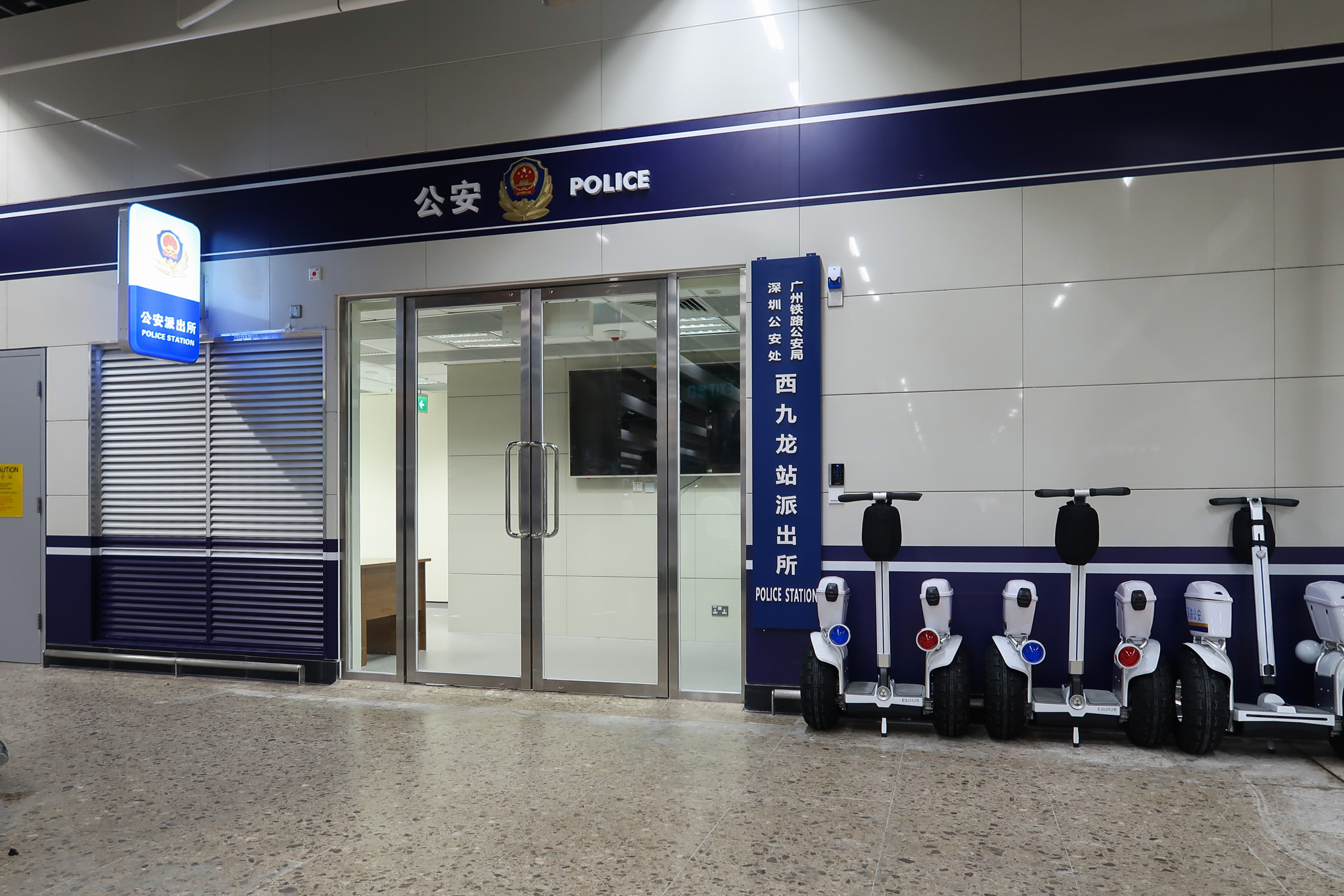
West Kowloon Station Police Station

The Ministry of Public Security Railway Public Security Bureau (10th Bureau) operates a Railway Public Security Bureau (铁路公安局) in all 18 Passenger groups of the China Railway (For example, the Harbin Railway PSB has jurisdiction over the China Railway Harbin Group). Under Railway Public Security Bureaus are Railway Public Security Divisions (铁路公安处), which are in every Hub station. Train stations have their own police stations, including the Mainland Port Area in Hong Kong West Kowloon station.

The main crimes handled by Railway Public Security Bureaus are seat hogging, sexual harassment and petty theft, though they are responsible for handling all crime occurring on railroads in their jurisdiction.

Railway Public Security Divisions often operate railway SWAT teams.

=== Forest Public Security Bureaus ===
Provincial Public Security Departments also operate Forest Public Security Bureaus, who are in charge of law enforcement in forests of their respective provinces; Many municipal PSBs also operate their own municipal Forestry PSBs. The main crimes handled include illegal logging, illegal fishing, poaching and environmental crime. They are also in charge of search and rescue, environmental protection and wildfire suppression in their jurisdiction.

Until recently, provincial forest PSBs were under the provincial Forestry Department, though in recent years Forest Public Security Bureaus have begun to be transferred over to be handed over to the provincial public security department, the first being the Hainan Provincial Forest Public Security Bureau being transferred to the Hainan Provincial Public Security Department in December 2018, with other provinces following in the 2020s.

== Relations with other agencies ==
=== Ministry of State Security ===
The network of public security bureaus and the Ministry of Public Security should not be confused with the separate but parallel networks of state security bureaus/state security departments, administered at the national level by the Ministry of State Security (MSS).

The MSS is responsible for external and internal intelligence, and performing a "secret police" or security police role responsible for preemptive response to 'mass incidents' (Chinese terminology for protests or social disturbances) and internal security.

The two systems are administratively separate, although at local levels they co-operate to a large extent and often share resources and internal security bureaus are structured as units or departments within public security bureaus (PSBs) to allow for closer and more effective integrated operations and cooperation as needed.

=== Chengguan ===
Many local public security bureaus often clash with local Chengguan units when PSB Police officers respond to reports of Chengguan brutality, resulting in many cases of PSB Police being assaulted along with police equipment, such as bodycams and even firearms being stolen.

=== People's Armed Police ===
Public security bureaus often participate in Joint patrols with local People's Armed Police units. Additionally, one of the major roles of the People's Armed police is to provide assistance to the local PSB during mass incidents such as riots, gang related activities and terrorism.

== See also ==
- Ministry of Public Security (China)
  - Beijing Municipal Public Security Bureau
  - Shanghai Municipal Public Security Bureau
  - Guangdong Provincial Public Security Department
  - People's Police (China)
