= Invitation to tea =

Chinese euphemism for police interrogation

An "invitation to tea" (喝茶, hē chá, lit. 'drink tea') is a Chinese euphemism for being summoned and interrogated by the People's Police. Once something of an urban legend, the phrase is now promoted by government officials including the Ministry of State Security (MSS) itself to warn the public of the dangers of engaging in unapproved behavior or speech. Most Western observers describe it as a tool of intimidation and political repression.

== History and usage ==
According to BBC News, the euphemism describes the typical manner in which a summons from the police is presented:

"The invitation comes from the authorities in the form of a phone call, and a knock on the door. Those being invited range from celebrities who have expressed strong views on a topical issue to well-known dissidents and young people who get bold on the internet. The questioning normally lasts a few hours - tea might or might not be drunk during the session. The security people will ask you about your activities and issue warnings to stop or face the consequences."

The interrogations occur primarily in police stations, although some have reported being cornered at workplaces or in schools, or at home, with police forcing their way in. According to activists who have experienced the interrogations, invitations to tea don't involve beating or sustained verbal abuse as they serve as the bottom rung of the government intimidation and persecution ladder, and "depending on how big a threat you are in their perception, things can become much worse." According to Reporters Without Borders, reporters and dissidents who persist often find the invitations to tea are followed by criminal proceedings or arbitrary detention in the country's black jails.

== Use by Chinese authorities ==
Just before Chinese New Year in 2024, the MSS published a list of 10 types of misconduct which might cause individuals to find themselves invited for tea. The list, published both on WeChat and in the Beijing Daily, included:

1. Suspected acts endangering national security
2. Acts or complicity in espionage
3. Failure to take security precautions against spying
4. Violation of permits for construction projects involving national security issues
5. Refusal to cooperate with an espionage investigation
6. Illegally acquiring or holding state secrets
7. Illegal production or use of spy devices
8. Disseminating state secrets
9. Violation of the order to leave the country
10. Acts endangering national security other than espionage

Reporters Without Borders described the post as "a chilling reminder" to the 1.4 billion Chinese citizens visiting family for the new year to "choose their conversation topics carefully" as the offences are "defined in terms so vague that they could apply to any type of online or offline activity."
