= Guangdong Provincial Public Security Department =

Guangdong Provincial Public Security Department 广东省公安厅
- Patch of the Ministry of Public Security

- Badge of the People's Police
- Abbreviation: Guangdong PSD

Agency overview
- Employees: 2747 (2014)
- Annual budget: $4.165 billion RMB (2025)

Jurisdictional structure
- Operations jurisdiction: Guangdong, China
- Map of Guangdong (red)
- Area: 179,800 km^{2} (69,400 sq mi)
- Population: 126,012,510
- Legal jurisdiction: Guangdong
- Primary governing body: People's Police
- Secondary governing body: Guangdong Provincial People's Government
- General nature: Local civilian police

Operational structure
- Headquarters: 97 Huanghua road, Guangzhou
- Agency executive: Liu Guozhou

Facilities
- Helicopters: Eurocopter EC135; Eurocopter EC225 Super Puma; Airbus Helicopters H175
- Ground Vehicles: 524 (as of 2024)

Website
- http://gdga.gd.gov.cn/

The Guangdong Provincial Public Security Department (Chinese: 广东省公安厅) is the primary civilian law enforcement agency of Guangdong. It operates under the dual leadership of the provincial government and the People's Police. In each city and county, there is a public security bureau (sub-bureau), and police stations are established in towns, townships, and streets. The sub-bureau and police stations respectively receive leadership from the local people's government at the same level and the higher public security authorities. The director of the department is Liu Guozhou.

In 2025, the agency had a budget of 4.165 billion yuan, a 18.5% increase from 3.513 billion yuan in 2024.

== History ==
On May 30, 2008, the Shenzhen Municipal PSB deployed 235 SWAT officers and 45 vehicles to provide security in disaster-affected areas after the 2008 Sichuan Earthquake.

== Organization ==
The Guangdong PSD contains an Immigration Bureau, an Economic Crime Bureau, a Patrol Bureau (which is also in charge of food safety and environmental protection), an Investigation Bureau, a Narcotics Bureau, a Traffic Management Bureau, a Cyberpolice Bureau, a Marine Police Unit, a Forestry Bureau, a Airport Police Bureau, an Anti-Smuggling Bureau, a Detention center Management Unit and a Police Aviation Unit.

=== Child agencies ===
- Guangzhou Municipal Public Security Bureau
- Shenzhen Municipal Public Security Bureau

== Employees ==
The Guangdong Public Security Department had 2747 employees (not including Child Agencies) as of 2014.

== Vehicles ==
As of 20 December 2024, the Guangdong PSD operated a total of 524 ground vehicles. Speedboats have also been used by SWAT units.

=== Helicopters ===
- Eurocopter EC135
- Eurocopter EC225
- Airbus Helicopters H175

== Firearms ==
SWAT units have been seen with the Type 64 pistol.

The Type 56 carbine is used for ceremonial purposes.

== Line of duty deaths ==
Since the Guangdong Public Security Department was established, 1433 officers have been killed in the line of duty including Child agencies, 1360 of which were between 1949 and 2022. 15 have been narcotics officers or in narcotics-related incidents between 1997 and 2020. In the 1360 officers killed in the line of duty between 1949 and 2022, 510 achieved martyr status.

In 2018, a total of 37 officers of the Guangdong PSD were killed in the line of duty, including child agencies. 14 were patrol officers, 9 were traffic officers, 4 were investigation officers.

In 2022, a total of 60 officers of the Guangdong PSD were killed in the line of duty, including child agencies, of which 37 were full time officers and 23 of which were auxiliary police.

In 2023, a total of 40 officers of the Guangdong PSD were killed in the line of duty (including child agencies), 23 of which were full time officers and 17 of which were auxiliary police.

In 2024, a total of 33 officers of the Guangdong PSD were killed in the line of duty, including child agencies (municipal and county public security bureaus).

== See also ==
- Guangdong State Security Department
- Guangdong Prison Administrative Bureau
- Shanghai Municipal Public Security Bureau
