= Nicholas Eftimiades =

American novelist

- Occupation: Defense Intelligence Agency- Senior Technical Officer in Future's Division
- Known for: National Security Space Office

Nicholas Eftimiades is an American government official, author, and educator best known for his work Chinese Intelligence Operations (1994). He currently resides in the Tokyo area. He is a current professor at Penn State Harrisburg.

== Education ==
Eftimiades graduated from George Washington University with a B.A. in East Asian studies and the National Defense Intelligence College with a M.S. in strategic intelligence. He also did undergraduate and graduate work in Asia. He is a visiting research fellow at the War Studies department of King's College London in the United Kingdom.

== Government career ==
Nicholas Eftimiades' 30-year government career includes seven years at the National Security Space Office leading engineering teams designing "generation after next" national security space capabilities. He was also senior technical officer in the Defense Intelligence Agency, Future's Division, and chief of DIA's Space Division. He served as DIA's lead for national space policy and strategy development.

Mr. Eftimiades has provided numerous briefings and testimony on national security, technology, and space exploration issues to senior policy officials and the U.S. Congress. He testified before the President's Commission on Implementation of United States Space Exploration Policy He has sponsored and chaired international conferences on U.S. and foreign defense policy issues. He is a frequent lecturer and public speaker on future technology and societal changes and national security issues.

== Chinese Intelligence Operations ==
Eftimiades first came into public view in 1994 with the publication of his book Chinese Intelligence Operations (Naval Institute Press, Annapolis, Maryland., March 1994). The book is an examination of the structure, operations, and methodology of the intelligence services of the People's Republic of China. The book received worldwide recognition with the Chinese government declaring Eftimiades "an enemy of the people" in the People's Daily newspaper. To date, the book remains the only scholarly analysis of China's intelligence services and operational methodology.

Chinese Intelligence Operations gained worldwide attention when one of the Chinese companies identified as having a relationship with China's intelligence services was identified as a donor to the Bill Clinton presidential campaign through the Democratic National Committee. This revelation resulted in Eftimiades appearing on TV, radio, and being quoted in newspapers. He appeared on CBS Evening News with Connie Chung, Dateline NBC, ABC's Day One, BBC America, National Public Radio and many other television and radio broadcasts. Some organizations protested the CBS news broadcast as being racist. Eftimiades testified before the U.S. Congress on several occasions.

== Science fiction ==
Eftimiades' most recent work is a political and philosophical satire entitled Edward of Planet Earth. The book is influenced by authors such as Alexander Zinoviev and Ignazio Silone—names not normally associated with science fiction. The story takes place 200 years in the future and centers on a man, his computer friends, a female companion and their quest to communicate with God.

== Non-profit activity ==
In 2001, Eftimiades founded a non-profit educational organization entitled the Federation of Galaxy Explorers to inspire youth interest in science and engineering. Students in the Galaxy Explorers program attend after school "Mission Team" meetings where they participate in hands-on lessons that support National Science Education Standards. Mission Team members are rewarded for participation and achievements with ribbons, patches, medals, and certificates. In addition to Mission Teams, Galaxy Explorers also have Summer Camps, Star Parities, and the Battle of the Rockets Competition.

== Podcasts ==
Eftimiades has been a guest on the various episodes of the podcast SpyTalk, Covert Actions: Russia and China and Behind the Bust of China's Brash New York Spy Base. He was a guest on the NucleCast episode 153, Chinese Espionage and the Impact on US National Security and on Combat Story's 181 episode Unmasking China Intelligence Threats, Capabilities, and Structure. He was a guest on the American Thought Leaders podcast episode Criminal State: Unmasking the CCP's Whole-of-Society Espionage Playbook. Eftimiades began looking into more than 900 cases of Chinese espionage and creating a database, which he spoke about in SpyCast's podcast on 1 April 2025.
