= China People's Police University =

Public university in Langfang, Hebei, China

The China People's Police University (CPPU; 中国人民警察大学) is a public university in Langfang, Hebei, China. It is affiliated with the Ministry of Public Security. These universities undertake training in the fields of public security police, immigration management teams, international police cooperation, foreign police, UN peacekeeping police and firefighting.

The institute was established as China People's Armed Police Force College (中国人民武装警察部队学院) in 1981. It changed to the current name in 2018 as part of the nationwide military reformation.
