= Yang Zili =

Yang Zili (Chinese: 杨子立; pinyin: Yáng Zǐlì) (born 1971), also known as Yang Zi (Chinese: 羊子), is a Chinese freelance journalist and webmaster, released in March, 2009 after having been imprisoned for eight years in the People's Republic of China for "subverting state authority."

== Biography ==
Born in 1971, Yang was born to a rural Muslim family in Daming County, Hebei Province. He received an undergraduate degree from Xi'an Communications University (Xi'an Jiaotong University), and attended Peking University from 1995 to 1998, receiving a Master's Degree in mechanics (Mechanical Engineering).

Yang is also an amateur poet and has two known published poems, Peasants - My Kinsmen in 1998, and The Ghost of Communism in 2001, and is married to Lu Kun.

== Social activism ==
In early 1997 whilst at Beijing University, he co-founded the Current Affairs Society, a student organization committed on discussion of social issues in China, which was banned several months later by school authorities.

In 1999, Yang and some close friends started to meet regularly and formed the New Youth Society to discuss social and political issues. Yang also started to publish his writings on his website, Yang Zili's Garden of Ideas, hosted originally at lib.126.com. After the closure of the site the contents were recovered by HumanRightsAction.org. He wrote articles for his website that advocated political freedoms, criticised the crackdown on the Falun Gong spiritual movement, and deplored the economic hardship of China's peasants.

=== Imprisonment ===
On 13 March 2001, Yang along with fellow New Youth Society members Xu Wei, Jin Haike, Zhang Honghai, were arrested by agents of the Ministry of State Security, and Yang was officially charged on 20 April with "subverting state authority."

On 28 September, Yang appeared before the Intermediate People's Court of Beijing, and was sentenced by the court on 28 May 2003 to eight years in prison. The case was appealed and the verdict was upheld on 10 November 2003.

In February 2007, Yang's wife, Lu Kun, requested a review of his trial because of new evidence that former State Security Bureau agent Li Yuzhou's fellow agents and superiors altered the four reports he made in order to justify arresting Yang. The Beijing Intermediate Court turned down her request, but she filed a new request to the Supreme People's Court and is still awaiting its decision. He was released in March, 2009.
