= Hidden front =

Chinese Communist Party term for covert operations

In Chinese Communist Party (CCP) jargon, the hidden front (Chinese: 隐蔽战线; pinyin: yǐnbì zhànxiàn, sometimes translated as "hidden battlefront", "hidden struggle" or "covert front") is a phrase that describes CCP espionage and influence operations, including when the CCP was still an underground movement in mainland China before the establishment of the People's Republic in 1949.

== Contemporary usage ==
=== In China ===
A government website in Henan, in reference to CCP intelligence activities against the Kuomintang during the Chinese Civil War, remarked that "fighters on the covert front are loyal guardians of national security. At present, the situation of the struggle is changing, the situation of the hidden enemy is grim and complicated, and on the special battlefield of the hidden front, there are many unsung heroes who are silently dedicating their youth and lives."

The Strait Herald, a newspaper of the Fujian Provincial Committee of the CCP, credited the hidden front for uncovering what it claims to be espionage activities of "the two Michael's" following Canada's arrest of Huawei CFO Meng Wanzhou. Former Ministry of State Security director and CCP Politburo member Chen Wenqing called on party members at all levels to attach great importance to and support the work of the "hidden front".

The 2020 edition of The Science of Military Strategy (战略学; Zhanlüe Xue), a core textbook for People's Liberation Army (PLA) officers, states that enemy hidden front activities, such as psychological warfare and inciting defections, have become increasingly intense.

=== In the West ===
According to Alex Joske, hidden front describes espionage, counterespionage, and influence operations in support of China's national objectives, as well as similar actions taken by adversaries. According to Radio France Internationale, the hidden front involves Chinese intelligence officers as well as their cooptees such as diplomats, journalists, businesspeople, and students.
