= Guangdong Provincial People's Government =

Provincial-level government of Guangdong, China

Guangdong Provincial People's Government 广东省人民政府
- Established: 6 November 1949

Leadership
- Governor: Wang Weizhong since 27 December 2021
- Executive Deputy Governor: Zhang Hu since 16 February 2022
- Deputy Governors: Zhang Guozhi, Zhang Shaokang, Liu Hongbing, Liu Guozhou, Wang Sheng
- Secretary-general: Chen Min
- Parent body: State Council of China; Guangdong Provincial People's Congress
- Elected by: Guangdong Provincial People's Congress

Website
- www.gd.gov.cn

The Guangdong Provincial People's Government is the provincial administrative agency of Guangdong. It is officially elected by the Guangdong Provincial People's Congress and is formally responsible to the Provincial People's Congress and its Standing Committee. The provincial government is headed by a governor, currently Wang Weizhong. Under the country's one-party system, the governor is subordinate to the secretary of the Guangdong Provincial Committee of the Chinese Communist Party.

== History ==
On 6 November 1949, the Guangdong Provincial People's Government was formally established. On 12 February 1955, it was renamed to the Guangdong Provincial People's Committee. On 20 February 1968, the Guangdong Provincial Revolutionary Committee was established. In December 1979, the Guangdong Provincial Revolutionary Committee was abolished and replace with the Guangdong Provincial People's Government.

== Organization ==
The organization of the Guangdong Provincial People's Government includes:

- General Office of the Guangdong Provincial People's Government

=== Component Departments ===
- Guangdong Provincial Development and Reform Commission
- Guangdong Provincial Department of Education
- Guangdong Provincial Department of Science and Technology
- Guangdong Provincial Department of Industry and Information Technology
- Guangdong Provincial Ethnic and Religious Affairs Committee
- Guangdong Provincial Public Security Department
- Guangdong Provincial Department of Civil Affairs
- Guangdong Provincial Department of Justice
- Guangdong Provincial Department of Finance
- Guangdong Provincial Department of Human Resources and Social Security
- Guangdong Provincial Department of Natural Resources
- Guangdong Provincial Department of Ecology and Environment
- Guangdong Provincial Department of Housing and Urban-Rural Development
- Guangdong Provincial Department of Transportation
- Guangdong Provincial Water Resources Department
- Guangdong Provincial Department of Agriculture and Rural Affairs
- Guangdong Provincial Department of Commerce
- Guangdong Provincial Department of Culture and Tourism
- Guangdong Provincial Health Commission
- Guangdong Provincial Department of Veterans Affairs
- Guangdong Provincial Emergency Management Department
- Guangdong Provincial Audit Office

=== Directly affiliated special institutions ===
- State-owned Assets Supervision and Administration Commission of Guangdong Provincial People's Government

=== Directly affiliated institutions ===
- Guangdong Provincial Administration for Market Regulation
- Guangdong Provincial Government Service Data Management Bureau
- Guangdong Provincial Radio and Television Bureau
- Guangdong Provincial Sports Bureau
- Guangdong Provincial Bureau of Statistics
- Guangdong Provincial Medical Insurance Bureau
- Guangdong Provincial People's Government Counselor's Office
- Guangdong Provincial Bureau of Letters and Calls

=== Managed agencies ===
- Guangdong Provincial Bureau of Grain and Material Reserves is managed by the Provincial Development and Reform Commission.
- Guangdong Provincial Energy Bureau is managed by the Provincial Development and Reform Commission.
- Guangdong Provincial Social Organization Administration Bureau is managed by the Provincial Department of Civil Affairs.
- Guangdong Provincial Prison Administration Bureau is managed by the Provincial Department of Justice.
- Guangdong Provincial Drug Rehabilitation Administration is managed by the Provincial Department of Justice.
- Guangdong Provincial Forestry Bureau is managed by the Provincial Department of Natural Resources.
- Guangdong Provincial Administration of Traditional Chinese Medicine is managed by the Provincial Health Commission.
- Guangdong Provincial Drug Administration is managed by the Provincial Market Supervision Bureau.

=== Organizations under the Provincial Government ===
- Guangdong Provincial Government Affairs Bureau
- Guangdong Academy of Sciences
- Guangdong Academy of Social Sciences
- Guangdong Academy of Agricultural Sciences
- Guangdong Provincial People's Government Development Research Center
- Guangdong Provincial People's Government Local Chronicles Office
- Guangdong Provincial Construction Project Management Bureau
- Guangdong Provincial Geological Bureau
- Guangdong Supply and Marketing Cooperative

=== Dispatched agencies ===
- Guangdong Provincial People's Government Office in Beijing
- Guangdong Provincial People's Government Office in Shanghai
- Hengqin-Guangdong-Macao Deep Cooperation Zone Office of the Guangdong Provincial People's Government

== Leadership ==
Name	Office	Party	Date of birth	Other offices	Ref.
Wang Weizhong	Governor Secretary of the Provincial Government Party Leading Group	CCP	March 1962 (age 64)	Deputy Secretary of the Party Guangdong Provincial Committee Member of the CCP Central Committee	
Zhang Hu	Executive Deputy Governor Deputy Secretary of the Party Leading Group	CCP	January 1967 (age 59)		
Zhang Guozhi	Deputy Governor Member of the Party Leading Group	CCP	June 1973 (age 53)		
Zhang Shaokang	Deputy Governor	JS	September 1965 (age 61)		
Liu Hongbing	Deputy Governor Member of the Party Leading Group	CCP	July 1969 (age 57)		
Liu Guozhou	Deputy Governor Member of the Party Leading Group	CCP	December 1971 (age 54)	Director of the Guangdong Provincial Public Security Department	
Wang Sheng	Deputy Governor Member of the Party Leading Group	CCP	March 1968 (age 58)		
Chen Liangxian	Member of the Party Leading Group	CCP	September 1963 (age 63)		
Chen Min	Secretary-General Member of the Party Leading Group	CCP	December 1965 (age 60)		
