= Ministry of State Security (China) =

Civilian intelligence agency of China

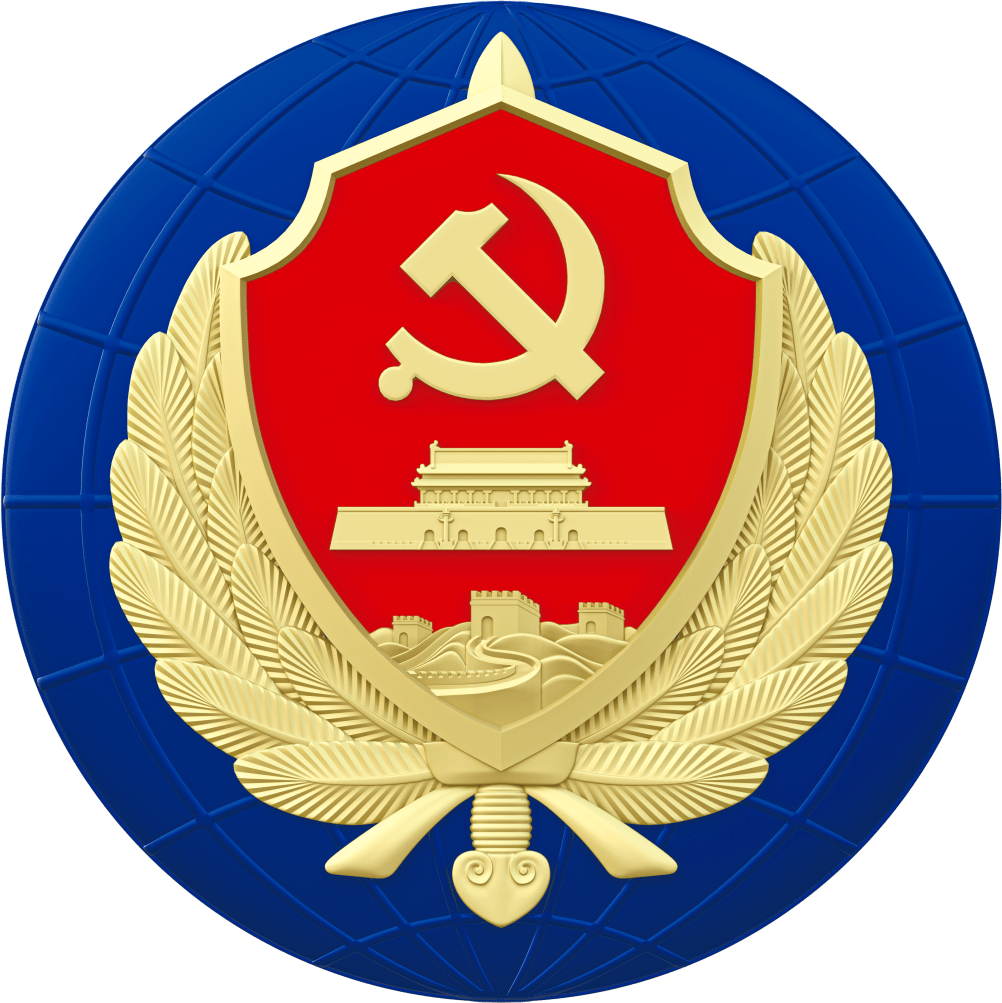
- Seal of the MSS

Ministry overview
- Formed: 1 July 1983
- Preceding agencies: Central Special Branch; Central Social Affairs Department; Central Investigation Department
- Type: Constituent Department of the State Council
- Jurisdiction: People's Republic of China
- Headquarters: Yidongyuan No. 100 Xiyuan, Haidian, Beijing, China 39°59′32″N 116°16′42″E
- Motto: "Serve the people firmly and purely, reassure the party, be willing to contribute, be able to fight hard and win"
- Employees: 110,000 (Alex Joske); 600,000 (James Andrew Lewis); 800,000 (FBI estimate per Calder Walton)
- Minister responsible: Commissioner General Chen Yixin, Minister
- Deputy Ministers responsible: Tang Dai; Shi Haoyong; Yuan Yiku
- Ministry executive: Nie Furu, Head of Political Department
- Parent organization: Central National Security Commission; Central Political and Legal Affairs Commission
- Child ministry: State Security Police
- Website: www.12339.gov.cn

Chinese name
- Simplified Chinese: 国家安全部
- Traditional Chinese: 國家安全部
- Literal meaning: State Security Ministry
Transcriptions
Standard Mandarin
- Hanyu Pinyin: Guójiā Ānquán Bù

The Ministry of State Security (Note: Chinese: 国家安全部; pinyin: Guójiā Ānquán Bù; lit. 'State Security Ministry'; IPA: [kwǒ.tɕjá án.tɕʰɥɛ̌n pû]) (MSS) is the principal civilian intelligence and security service of the People's Republic of China, responsible for foreign intelligence, counterintelligence, covert action, and the political security of the Chinese Communist Party. One of the largest and most secretive intelligence agencies in the world, it maintains powerful semi-autonomous branches in every province and city and administers the country's secret police, the State Security Police. The ministry is headquartered at Yidongyuan, a large compound in Beijing's Haidian district.

The origins of the MSS date to the beginnings of the CCP's Central Special Branch, established in 1927. It was replaced by the Central Social Affairs Department from 1936 through the proclamation of the People's Republic in 1949. In 1955, the department was replaced with the Central Investigation Department, which existed in various forms through the Cultural Revolution to 1983, when it was merged with counterintelligence elements of the Ministry of Public Security (MPS) to form the current Ministry of State Security. The creation of the MSS marked the first time a Chinese intelligence organ was placed under the State Council instead of the party.

An executive department of the State Council, the contemporary MSS is an all-source intelligence organization with a broad mandate and expansive authorities to undertake global campaigns of espionage and covert action on the so-called "hidden front." Within China, the ministry leverages extrajudicial law enforcement authorities to achieve its domestic objectives: the State Security Police serve as a secret police authorized to detain and interrogate people in what is known as an "invitation to tea." Those remanded by state security are detained in the ministry's own detention facilities.

Outside the mainland, the ministry is best known for its numerous advanced persistent threat groups, some outsourced to contractors, which carry out prolific industrial and cyber espionage campaigns. The ministry has also been implicated in political and transnational repression and harassment of dissidents abroad. Its influence operations, carried out with the United Front Work Department in accordance with the "three warfares" doctrine, have produced some of the country's most pervasive diplomatic rhetoric including "great changes unseen in a century" and "China's peaceful rise." Estimates of the ministry's size range from 110,000 to 800,000 employees, with most of the workforce spread between the dozens of semi-autonomous bureaus across the country.

== Overview ==
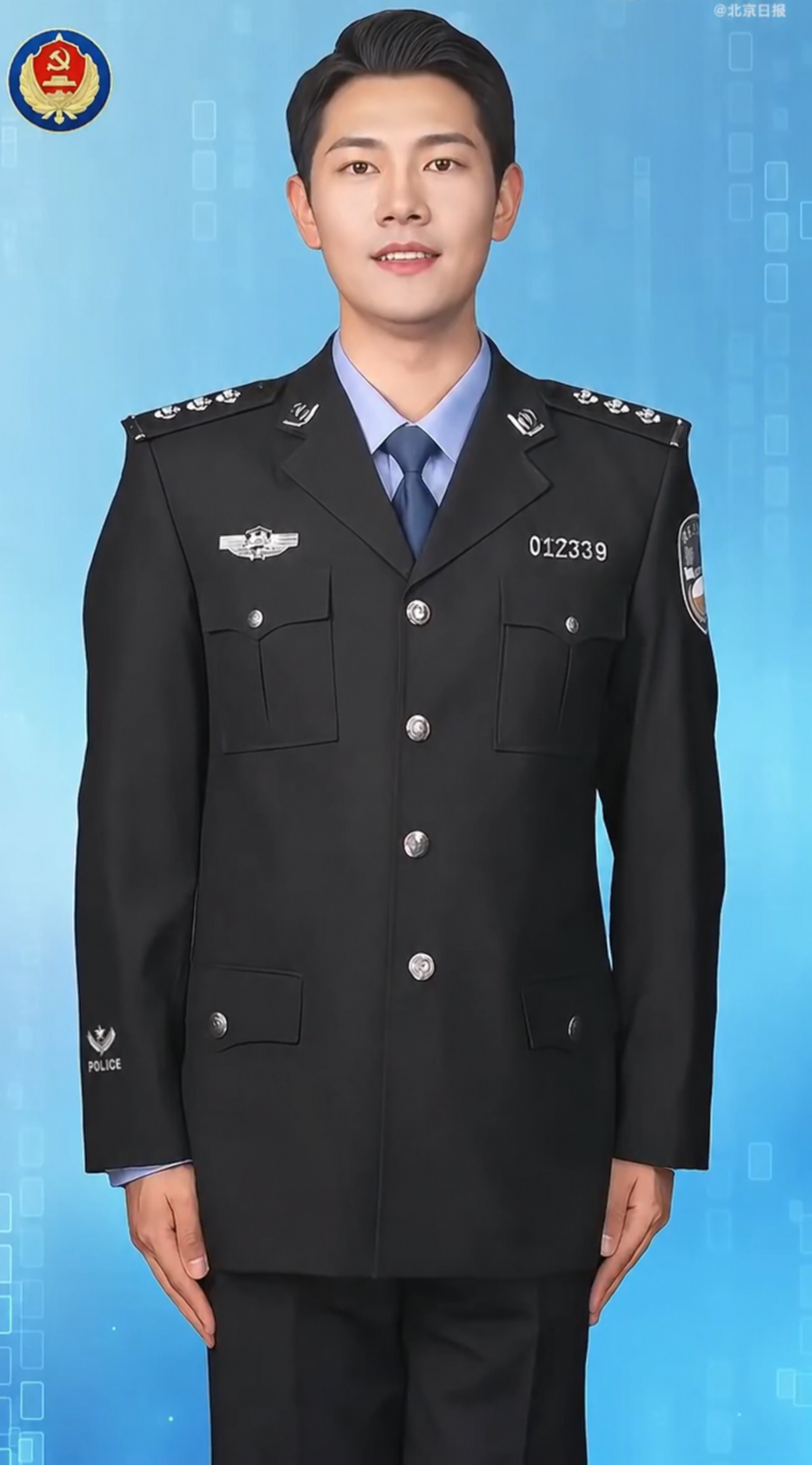
Current dress uniform of an MSS officer

MSS functions as an intelligence and counterintelligence service, and secret police. A document from the U.S. Department of Justice described the agency as being like a combination of the Central Intelligence Agency (CIA) and Federal Bureau of Investigation (FBI). Australian author Clive Hamilton described it as being similar to an amalgamation of the Australian Security Intelligence Organisation (ASIO) and the Australian Secret Intelligence Service (ASIS) "with a lot more power and less subject to the constraints of the rule of law." It is an all-source intelligence organization with a broad mandate and expansive authorities to undertake global campaigns of espionage and covert action on the so-called "hidden front." Its influence operations have been carried out with the United Front Work Department in accordance with the "three warfares" doctrine.

According to Peter Mattis, president of the Jamestown Foundation and former CIA analyst, and his fellow analyst Matthew Brazil, a former U.S. Army officer and diplomat in Asia:

"The language Chinese intelligence uses reflects its Marxist–Leninist and revolutionary heritage. The lexicon suggests (as has been borne out in interviews with former officials who had routine contacts with their Chinese counterparts) that the intelligence services are bastions of faith in the CCP. Although they may be practical in terms of techniques and methods to acquire intelligence, this information is filtered through a Marxist–Leninist lens. The implication is that foreign targets are viewed in the worst possible light."

The MSS is a civilian agency that controls its own secret police force, the State Security Police, which is one of the four components of the People's Police. The State Security Police is authorized to detain and interrogate people in what is known as an "invitation to tea." Those remanded by state security are detained in the ministry's own detention facilities. The MSS seal contains the emblem of the Chinese Communist Party and the official uniform is identical to that of the other People's Police, with the only difference being the police insignia include the Chinese characters "国安" ("State Security").

Article 4 of the Criminal Procedure Law of the People's Republic of China gives the MSS the same authority to arrest or detain people as MPS for crimes involving state security with identical supervision by the procuratorates and the courts. The National Intelligence Law of 2017 grants the MSS broad powers to conduct many types of espionage both domestically and abroad; it also gives the MSS the power to administratively detain those who impede or divulge information on intelligence work for up to 15 days.

== History ==
=== Central Special Branch (1928–1936) ===
In November 1927, the CCP established its first formal intelligence service, with Zhou Enlai founding the Central Special Branch (often shortened to Teke; sometimes written Special Services Section (SSS)) to conduct "special operations" work. With Xiang Zhongfa and Gu Shunzhang's assistance, Zhou designed the organization that many Chinese intelligence officers today see as the origins of their enterprise. Establishing secret bases across the Chinese territory, the Teke was composed of four sections led by Gu Shunzhang and Kang Sheng.

Zhou's primary objective was to disrupt the Kuomintang's secret police attempts to penetrate the CCP which required both a defensive counterintelligence effort to identify potentially traitorous members of the party and an offensive intelligence effort to plant spies within the Kuomintang's security and intelligence services. To prevent leaks and limit damage caused by infiltration by Nationalist spies, agents of Teke were forbidden to have any relationship with other agents making the party so compartmentalized that many never knew the name of the organization only calling it "Wu Hao's Dagger", a reference to Zhou Enlai's nom de guerre.

Based in Shanghai, Teke grew to become "a small army of messengers, people smugglers, and informers" with a constant presence in clubs, religious organizations, music groups, and brothels serving as Zhou Enlai's (and subsequently the CCP's) eyes and ears both in Shanghai and across the nation. Nonetheless, Teke had to compete with the newly established KMT Bureau of Investigation and Statistics (BIS) under the notorious Dai Li whose nickname as the "Chinese Himmler" lives on for his horrific torture record which included death in excruciating agony and forced heroin overdosing. Under Dai Li, the BIS created vast networks of 100,000 operatives across and outside the borders of China and mastered new means of intercepting communist communications — an art taught to the KMT by American cryptographer Herbert Yardley for use against the Japanese. The overwhelming advantages of the KMT were challenged only by the extensive and thorough infiltration of the security services by Teke agents including Qian Zhuangfei, Li Kenong, and Hu Di.

Gu Shunzhang, whom Zhou Enlai had chosen to head operations for Teke, would prove to be one of the most adversely consequential members of the CCP's underground intelligence ring. Having been born in Shanghai on "the wrong side of the tracks" according to French author Roger Faligot, Gu lived crudely out of bars smoking opium, having affairs, and joining the Green Gang but made a name for himself as a magician. Made a bodyguard for Mikhail Borodin, the Comintern agent and advisor to the Kuomintang from Soviet Russia, Gu was sent to Vladivostok to learn the tactics of insurrection and tradecraft of espionage as Borodin feared division between the Chinese nationalists and communists. A trained spy, Gu led Teke operations from the group's 1927 founding until 25 April 1931.

While performing the typical magic show for young children that usually covered for his espionage missions, a nationalist informer who had turned on the CCP recognized Gu from a photograph and alerted the KMT authorities. A number of KMT agents appeared and tackled Gu, not only gleeful to have detained one of their most challenging communist adversaries but were successful in turning the spymaster against the communists making Gu the most notorious intelligence traitor in modern Chinese history. As Gu provided the KMT with a flood of Teke agents' names and safe house locations, Zhou's spy inside the BIS, Qian Zhuangfei, immediately notified Zhou and Kang Shang who were able to relocate every Teke agent within two days — avoiding a potential extermination of CCP's core. Some agents, however, were located and arrested. On 21 June 1931, presumably with help from Gu's defection, the KMT captured CCP General Secretary Xiang Zhongfa hiding in a jewelry store with his cabaret dancer mistress. Despite offering to convert to the KMT party, Xiang was shot by his jailers before the received word of Chiang Kai-shek's pardon. Though the CCP's nascent intelligence branch under Kang Shang had narrowly escaped destruction, the damage done by Gu's defection and the number of communist spy arrests attrited the group until, in 1935, the CCP elected to disband it. While many of Teke's agents moved to the Red Army's Political Protection Bureau (PPB) led by Dong Fa, the PPB focused entirely on counterintelligence meaning real intelligence collection would go largely dormant until the formation of the Society Department.

=== Society Department (1936–1955) ===
In 1936, the CCP established the Society Department at the CCP Central Committee (中国共产党中央委员会社会部) in Yan'an, Shaanxi to consolidate the party's foreign intelligence and counterintelligence efforts. It wasn't until 1938 when Kang Sheng took control of the department and restructured the organization that it took its final form in the merging of the preceding Special Branch, the Political Protection Bureau (which Kang Sheng had previously headed), and the Guard Office. The Political Protection Bureau provided rear area security to CCP forces prior to the Long March and close security to Mao during the march while the Guard Office established a local constabulary and counterintelligence service. Under Kang Sheng and his deputy Li Kenong, the Society Department provided the CCP foreign intelligence, domestic intelligence, military security, and political security in every province in which communist forces held terrain.

From 1942 to 1944, as the Society Department expanded, Kang Sheng became paranoid and fearful of spies within his organization. Kang, known as the "Chinese Beria" abroad, frequently reminded others that political deviation was inextricably linked to being a traitorous spy, remarking "There is a close link between the twin crimes of espionage and deviationism. One is not a deviationist, as we have tended to believe, by chance or error. It is, ineluctably, dialectically, because one is a Japanese agent or a Kuomintang spy—or both. We must begin a ruthless hunt to root out these two plagues from Yan'an because, by fighting against deviationism, we weaken the clandestine plots of our enemies, and vice versa." Convinced that at least 30 percent of his organization were counterrevolutionaries and spies, Kang established a counterintelligence quota which contributed greatly to the practice of bigongxin, forcing a false confession in order to build a case against the accused. Kang's counterintelligence inquisition utilized "techniques of punishment and interrogation inspired by the millennia-long Chinese tradition of torture, updated by twentieth-century Stalinism for the requirements of the era" with torture practices including driving bamboo spikes under fingernails, inserting hair from a horse's tail into the penis, pumping high-pressure water into the vagina, cutting off the breasts of women looking for their tortured husbands, forcing the ingestion of large amounts of vinegar, applying burning incense to armpits, tying to a whipped horse's tail, and live burials. Kang's perceived connection between political deviation and traitorship led many senior leaders to avoid criticizing Kang's purges.

Known by 1944 as the "party hangman", Kang was eventually opposed by Zhou Enlai and later Mao Zedong who forced Kang to produce his own self-criticism proclaiming that perhaps only 10 percent of the comrades accused were spies and, in November 1944, relieved him of the position as head of the Society Department. Various rumors for the cause of his removal endure. One version claims that his paranoid purges made him a target of many senior communist officials, many of whom found themselves in Kang's sights. Another less likely explanation from Mao's physician, Li Zhuisui, claims that Kang suffered acute paranoia and symptoms of schizophrenia and was consequently sent to a mental asylum. American intelligence reportedly believed Kang's downfall was the result of the collapse of the pro-Stalinist faction proceeding the deaths of Stalin and Beria since Kang had trained as an intelligence officer in Moscow. Li Kenong, the new head of the Society Department, developed the organization's intelligence networks and was appointed by Zhou Enlai to simultaneously serve as the nation's deputy minister of foreign affairs.

=== Investigation Department (1955–1983) ===
In an effort to disaffiliate the intelligence service from Kang Sheng's paranoia-driven legacy of purges, the organization was renamed to the CCP Central Committee Investigation Department (中国共产党中央委员会调查部) with only one SAD branch moved out to its own organization, the Legal and Administrative Work Department.

In the 1950s, nearly every Chinese embassy abroad had an Investigation and Research Office, a cover for a group of intelligence officers belonging to the Investigation Department who kept close watch on diplomats and embassy staff, often sitting in on meetings and reporting back to CID headquarters' Eight Bureau (known later as the "Institute of Contemporary International Relations").

On 9 February 1962, Li Kenong died after a period of illness from the residual effects of brain damage from a fall he had sustained three years prior. Kong Yuan, Kang Sheng's former secretary and friend of Zhou Enlai, ran the service with Zou Dapeng and Luo Qingchang as his deputies.

Early in 1966, Mao Zedong and his defense chief Marshal Lin Biao plotted to overthrow army Chief of Staff and Deputy Prime Minister Luo Ruiqing who, despite being a lifelong supporter of the CCP and founder of the MPS, had opposed the political training in the military instituted at Mao's directive. Eager to thieve for the second time a senior position in the security services from Luo and to gain a stronghold over the party's security apparatus, Kang Sheng prepared a traitorous dossier on Luo complete with accusations of "illicit intercourse with foreigners". Lin Biao sent for Luo's arrest, and, under appalling conditions of incarceration and interrogation, Luo attempted to commit suicide in March by throwing himself from his cell breaking two legs after which Red Guards forced him to make his own self-criticism. As Mao Zedong launched his Cultural Revolution in 1966, Kang Sheng attempted to limit the destructive influence of the revolution on his intelligence and security apparatus issuing in September the directive "Codes, telegrams, confidential documents, files, and secret archives are the essential secrets of the Party and State; the safeguarding of all of these elements is the responsibility of all cadres, revolutionary masses, students, and revolutionary teachers." Despite this, Kang Sheng soon found that the calamitous red wave that overtook Mao's China would grow beyond his control. It wouldn't be until October 1978, after Mao's death in September 1976, that Hua Guofeng and Wang Dongxing would rebuild the Investigation Department which was officially reestablished on 28 July 1978. The organization still lacked experience or established tradecraft which would cause them a number of embarrassments.

==== Vietnamese invasion of Cambodia ====
The most impactful embarrassment of the newly reestablished Investigation Department (or Diaochabu) was their inability to predict the Vietnamese invasion of the Republic of Kampuchea (today Cambodia) in 1979. Following a visit to Democratic Kampuchea by Wang Dongxing in early November 1978, he and head of the new Investigation Department Luo Qinchang praised the ten-year friendship with the Khmer Rouge and helped Kaing Khek and Ta Mok to establish the neighboring communist party's notorious S-21 interrogation and extermination camp where around 20,000 Cambodians would be killed under Pol Pot's genocide. Within a month of Wang and Luo's return to China, the Socialist Republic of Vietnam launched a full-scale invasion of Kampuchea in response to a series of border attacks on the Liberation Army of Kampuchea. Perhaps by ideological closeness to Pol Pot and his followers, Chinese intelligence under the Investigation Department, and consequently PRC leadership, was caught by surprise by the Vietnamese invasion. Unable to contact the Khmer Rouge who, under the leadership of Ta Mok, had escaped into the jungles to organize a guerrilla resistance with only one Chinese agent carrying a defective satellite radio, a thousand Chinese military advisors fled Cambodia via Thailand and left 4,000 civilian advisors to the invading Vietnamese army. Compounding the intelligence failure, as the invasion broke the Investigation Department expressed confidence to Chinese leaders that the invasion would be easily repelled and that the Chinese embassy in the capital, Phnom Penh, would be unharmed.

Hoping to force a Vietnamese withdrawal from its ally Cambodia, the People's Republic of China launched their own southward invasion across the border into Vietnam in February 1979 which was withdrawn four weeks later after heavy resistance by Vietnamese guerrillas bearing Soviet and American weapons. Nonetheless, head of the CCP Deng Xiaoping supported the Khmer Rouge for another ten years in exile limiting his criticism of the two million-victim genocide assessing "the domestic counterintelligence activities created a negative atmosphere, slowing down many activities and causing social problems as well as many other problems... A thorough study of this political aspect should be undertaken and concrete measures taken."

==== End of the Investigation Department ====
At the end of the Cultural Revolution, as China struggled to regain its footing after a tumultuous decade, Deng Xiaoping and his fellow reformers Hu Yaobang and Zhao Ziyang endeavored down the road of governmental reform. CCP general secretary Hu Yaobang decried Kang Sheng's destructive and paranoid legacy in a speech in November 1978 enumerating many of the crimes Kang Sheng had been found guilty of, up to and through the Cultural Revolution. Kang's condemnation was bolstered by the investigation prepared by Luo Qingchang's Investigation Department which detailed how Kang had organized the Yan'an purges and named any of his opponents "counter-revolutionary".

Deng Xiaoping was himself a victim of Mao's Cultural Revolution, the Gang of Four, and Kang Sheng's secret police. Deng's son, Deng Pufang, became paraplegic and needed to use a wheelchair after Red Guards threw him from a high window. After these experiences, Deng was committed to reforming the Chinese intelligence services. Deng first initiated a small but meaningful campaign to degrade Kang Sheng's legacy, which began with Hu Yaobang's speech. Next, Deng subordinated the Investigation Department into a minor political organ. Finally, Deng took all the "external intelligence expertise" from the Investigation Department and consolidated it and all the CCP's espionage and counterintelligence functions into a new, "revolutionized" Chinese intelligence service, fitting of the new era of the Chinese "opening-up" to the world.

=== Ministry of State Security (1983–present) ===
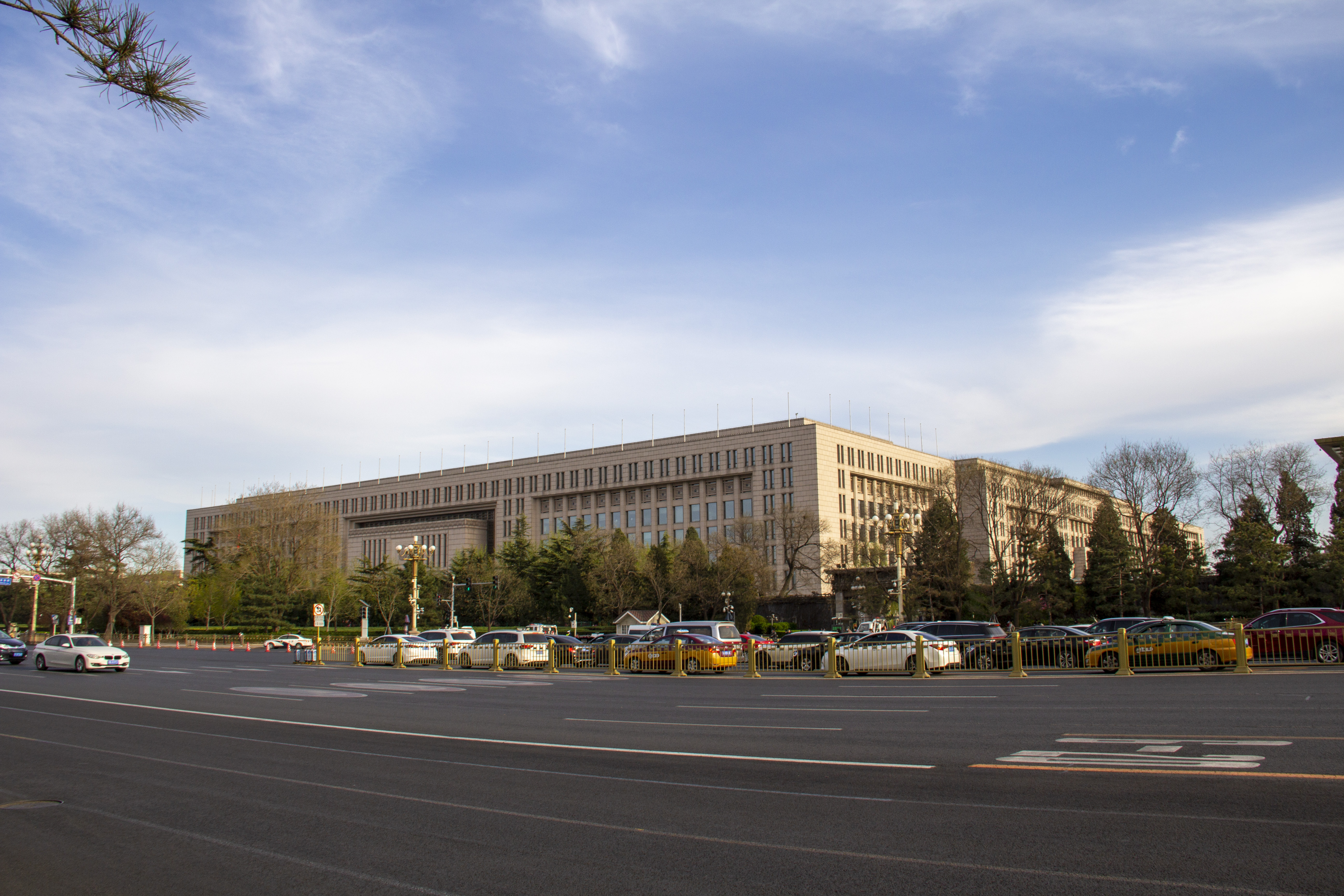
The headquarters of the Ministry of Public Security near Tiananmen Square are also officially listed as MSS headquarters, but those are actually located at No. 100 Xiyuan, Haidian District.

Proposed by Premier Zhao Ziyang and Minister of Public Security Liu Fuzhi and approved at the first session of the sixth National People's Congress (NPC), the Ministry of State Security (MSS) was approved on 20 June 1983 to be a merger between the Investigation Department and the Bureau of Investigating Counterrevolutionaries (or the First Bureau) of the Ministry of Public Security (MPS) to "protect the security of the state and strengthen China's espionage work". The following day, the NPC appointed Ling Yun to be the first Minister of State Security which would announce its establishment on 1 July 1983. There were serious political reasons behind the merger, as Luo Qingchang, who had been Director of the CID since 1973 and was a powerful player in Chinese Communist intelligence since the 1940s, was a fierce opponent of Deng Xiaoping. Although Deng had risen to supreme power in the late 1970s, he initially couldn't remove Luo from his post, until he finally succeeded in 1983. But even after this, Luo still remained influential as an adviser on the Central Leading Group for Taiwan Affairs. Although the MSS maintains loyalty to party and ideology as a central mission, its founding represents the first time that a Chinese intelligence organ was placed under the State Council instead of the party.

The 1st Bureau of the new MSS managed internal affairs and security in each of the provinces with the help of local and regional offices. The MSS also maintained a number of laogai camps where apprehended enemy spies like the Taiwanese "Society of the Continent" network in Tianjin. The 2nd Bureau of the MSS was responsible for foreign intelligence collection beginning in the nearby capitals of Tokyo, Bangkok, and Singapore. Intelligence officers of the 2nd Bureau operated under diplomatic cover posing as advisors or secretaries to diplomats in-country. The MSS' 3rd Bureau was responsible for nearby areas the People's Republic of China wished to draw back into the CCP's control: Hong Kong, Taiwan, and Macau. The 4th Bureau focused on the technical aspects of espionage, the 5th Bureau for local intelligence, the 6th Bureau for counterintelligence, the 7th Bureau that conducted surveillance or special operations, and the 8th Bureau engaged in research through open-source intelligence. The 8th Bureau took control over the former branch of the Investigation Department called the China Institutes of Contemporary International Relations (CICIR) whose members denied any connections to the Chinese intelligence apparatus. The 9th Bureau managed the threat of enemy infiltration and MSS officer defections, the 10th Bureau worked with the State Scientific & Technological Commission and the intelligence section of the Commission for Science, Technology, and Industry for National Defense (COSTIND). The 11th Bureau managed computers, networks, and information technology equipment, and finally the 12th Bureau was responsible for liaising with foreign intelligence services under the name of the Office of Foreign Affairs. Officers of the 12th Bureau worked with the CIA's David Gries, BND's Dr. Herms Bahl, MI6's Nigel Inkster, and the DGSE's Thierry Imbot while keeping them under surveillance. The so-called Office of Foreign Affairs also took up duties to surveil visiting tourists, diplomats, and journalists who began to enter the country after China's opening to the world. The MSS' first head announced "The intelligence agencies and secret services of some foreign countries have increased their spying activities against China's state secrets and are now sending agents to subvert and destroy our country."

One of the longest-serving Ministers of State Security was Jia Chunwang, a native of Beijing and a 1964 graduate of Tsinghua University, reportedly an admirer of the American Central Intelligence Agency (CIA). He served as Minister of State Security from 1985 until March 1998, when the MSS underwent an overhaul and Xu Yongyue, a former secretary of party elder Chen Yun was appointed the new head of the organization. Jia was largely responsible for the development of the MSS out of each of the provincial departments of state security, wherein many police officers found themselves intelligence officers the next day. Within the first year, Jia consolidated the security departments of Beijing, Fujian, Guangdong, Guangxi, Heilongjiang, Jiangsu, Liaoning, and Shanghai. Between 1985 and 1988 Jia had managed to incorporate those departments of Chongqing, Gansu, Hainan, Henan, Shaanxi, Tianjin, and Zhejiang. From 1990 to 1995, Jia incorporated security departments from Anhui, Hunan, Qinghai, and Sichuan provinces. Jia was then appointed to the Minister of Public Security post, after 13 years as head of the MSS. After becoming the secretary of Central Political and Legal Affairs Commission in 2007, the MSS was under the command and influence of Zhou Yongkang until his ouster and conviction for corruption in 2014. One of the people responsible for "taking down" Zhou Yongkang was Chen Wenqing of the Central Commission for Discipline Inspection, who was nominated Minister of State Security by Chinese Premier Li Keqiang in 2016, partly as a reward for purging Zhou and his network, as well as replacing the prior minister Geng Huichang. Since CCP general secretary Xi Jinping assumed power in 2012, the MSS gained more responsibility over cyberespionage vis-à-vis the PLA, and has sponsored various advanced persistent threat groups such as Double Dragon. Starting in 2016, provincial and local state security bureaus were brought under centralized control. Under Xi, the ministry has drastically increased its profile. While its inner workings remain opaque, propaganda posters about national security branded with the ministry's seal are now a common sight in Chinese cities.

== Contemporary activities ==
The MSS recruits new intelligence officers primarily from major universities, police and military academies.

In March 2009, former MSS operative Li Fengzhi told the Washington Times in an interview that the MSS was engaged in counterintelligence, the collection of secrets and technology from other countries, and repressing internal dissent within China. The internal repression, according to Li, includes efforts against house churches, the underground church and the Falun Gong religious group, and censoring the Internet. Li emphasized that MSS's most important mission is, "to control the Chinese people to maintain the rule of the Communist Party."

In 2012, an executive assistant to MSS vice minister Lu Zhongwei was found to have been passing information to the CIA. Lu Zhongwei was not formally charged, but that incident was said to have infuriated Hu Jintao and led to a tightening on information dissemination and increased counterintelligence activities in Beijing and abroad.

The Shanghai State Security Bureau (SSSB) of the MSS has repeatedly been involved in both failed and successful attempts to recruit foreign agents.

The fundamental purpose of our counter-espionage struggle is to defend the security interests of our country. We must take resolute measures and never allow any country or political force to infiltrate, subvert or sabotage us. But we will also never carry out infiltration, subversion, and sabotage against other countries because we are a socialist country led by the Communist Party of China, which is determined by the nature of our country...

...The combination of public and secret, and the combination of specialised groups, is a fine tradition of our Party and an effective magic weapon in our concealed front to counter traitors and prevent spies. We must carry forward this fine tradition and make new developments in the new situation.

— Qiu Jin (邱进), Deputy Minister for National Security: Study and implement the anti-spy law with the overall national security concept as a guide, People's Daily (February 12, 2015)

Companies such as Huawei, China Mobile, and China Unicom have been implicated in MSS intelligence collection activities.

In 2019, according to a report released by the European External Action Service, there were an estimated 250 MSS spies operating in Brussels.

In September 2020, a journalist, a Chinese MSS operative and her Nepalese informant were arrested in India for providing classified information about Indian army deployments in Doklam area and India's Ministry of External Affairs to two officers of Yunnan State Security Department (YSSD) of the MSS.

In December 2020, 10 MSS Operatives of Xinjiang State Security Department (XSSD) were arrested in Kabul, Afghanistan by the National Directorate of Security. During questioning, one operative told the interrogators that they were gathering information about al Qaeda, the Taliban, and the Turkistan Islamic Party in Kunar and Badakhshan Provinces, and wanted to trap and assassinate high-level members of Turkistan Islamic Party. At least two of the operatives were also in contact with the Haqqani network for this job. After days of negotiations between Afghanistan and China, all of them were pardoned and were flown out of the country in a plane arranged by the Chinese government.

In late April 2021, the Ministry of State Security announced that it was introducing several new measures to fight alleged infiltration by "hostile forces" of Chinese companies and other institutions. These measures include drawing up a list of companies and organizations considered to be at risk of foreign infiltration and requiring them to take security measures. In addition, staff travelling on business trips to the Five Eyes countries (the United States, United Kingdom, Australia, Canada, and New Zealand) have been ordered to report all contact with foreign personnel, participate in anti-espionage seminars, and leave mobile phones, laptops, and USB drives at home before traveling abroad.

In December 2023, a joint investigation by Financial Times, Der Spiegel and Le Monde reported that Belgium former senator Frank Creyelman accepted bribes from MSS for three years to influence discussions within the European Union.

In March 2024, the MSS warned that overseas intelligences services had used foreign consulting firms as a cover to steal classified information and pose "major risks to national security."

=== Cyber activities ===
In 2017, the cyberespionage threat group known as Gothic Panda or APT3 was determined to have nation-state level capabilities and to be functioning on behalf of the MSS by researchers.

Regulations issued in September 2021 require operators of critical internet infrastructure in China to establish cybersecurity teams. MSS, along with the Ministry of Public Security, are required to vet the personnel on these cybersecurity teams.

In February 2024, files from an MSS contractor called I-Soon were leaked publicly. In March 2024, the United States Department of the Treasury's Office of Foreign Assets Control (OFAC) and UK government sanctioned an MSS front company called Wuhan Xiaoruizhi Science and Technology and affiliated individuals for placing malware in critical infrastructure and breaching the UK Electoral Commission.

=== Social media and film ===
In July 2023, the MSS opened a WeChat account, where it wrote its first post that it wishes to popularize counterintelligence among the population and make such activity "normal" with systems of rewards. In another post in September, the MSS criticized the policies of the United States towards China, saying that the US was "decoupling and disconnecting at the economic level, ganging up at the political level, deterrence and containment at the security level, discrediting and disparaging at the public opinion level, and constraining and locking down at the rules level". The ministry's WeChat posts receive millions of views.

In January 2024, the MSS published a list of "10 conditions", euphemistically referred to as "cups of tea" to its official WeChat channel; which would subject individuals to scrutiny and questioning by state security authorities, including but not limited to: endangering national security, illegally acquiring or holding state secrets, committing or assisting espionage, refusing to cooperate in an espionage investigation, leaking state secrets related to counter-espionage and intelligence works and "failing to take security precautions against spying". In October 2025, the MSS deployed an AI-generated anchor in uniform called "Agent 012339" on its WeChat channel to deliver national security narratives.

In March 2026, the thriller Scare Out was the first Chinese film to receive public backing from the MSS.

=== Surveillance of dissidents and ethnic minorities ===
Domestically, the MSS undertakes surveillance of ethnic minorities, especially in Tibet and Xinjiang.

According to Nicholas Eftimiades, "[o]ne of the MSS's responsibilities has been penetrating Chinese dissident groups abroad — what they call the 'five poisons': democracy advocates, Taiwan, Tibetans, Uyghurs and Falun Gong."

In the United States, MSS officers were reported to have worked with students affiliated with local university chapters of the Chinese Students and Scholars Association to surveil other students.

The core of political security is regime and institutional security, the most fundamental of which is to safeguard the leadership and governing position of the Communist Party of China and the socialist system with Chinese characteristics...national security organs have always placed the maintenance of political security at the top of their agenda, and have made political security their main focus.

— Ministry of State Security statement, 15 August 2023

During the 2008 Summer Olympics torch relay, MSS agents coordinated counter-protesters to disrupt pro-Tibetan independence demonstrations in San Francisco.

In December 2023, a joint investigation by Financial Times, Der Spiegel and Le Monde reported an agent of the Zhejiang branch of the MSS had been tasked with discrediting German anthropologist Adrian Zenz.

=== United front activities ===
The MSS also leverages so-called "united front" work for intelligence activity. In 1939, Zhou Enlai espoused "nestling intelligence within the united front" while also "using the united front to push forth intelligence." According to Australian analyst Alex Joske, "the united front system provides networks, cover and institutions that intelligence agencies use for their own purposes." Joske added that "united front networks are a golden opportunity for Party's spies because they represent groups of Party-aligned individuals who are relatively receptive to clandestine recruitment." Roger Faligot stated that the aftermath of the 1989 Tiananmen Square protests and massacre led to the "growing use of party organizations, such as the United Front Work Department and friendship associations, as fronts for intelligence operations."

== Organization ==
According to the Federation of American Scientists, MSS headquarters is in the Xiyuan (Chinese: 西苑; pinyin: Xīyuàn; lit. 'Western Park') area of Beijing's Haidian District. According to David Wise, Xiyuan also contains other MSS facilities. Bureaus may use cover identities under "one institution with two names". The MSS maintains powerful semi-autonomous branches at the provincial, city, municipality and township levels throughout China.

Bureau	Name	Responsibilities
First		
Second		Lead bureau for 'open line' foreign operations under official cover, collecting strategic international intelligence, particularly political intelligence.
Third		
Fourth	Taiwan, Hong Kong, and Macau Bureau	Intelligence work in Taiwan, Hong Kong, and Macau The Institute of Taiwan Studies is its public facing front for Taiwan operations.
Fifth	Report Analysis and Dissemination Bureau	Analysis and reporting on intelligence and collecting guidance on how to handle intelligence matters, responsible for coordinating operations with provincial bureaus
Sixth	CounterIntelligence Bureau	Its primary historical and ongoing responsibilities include conducting counterintelligence against foreign intelligence services, monitoring Western firms operating in China, and investigating overseas Chinese pro-democracy or human rights organizations. As part of monitoring Western firms, the Sixth Bureau targets foreign technology, primarily through economic espionage, intellectual property theft, and the targeting of foreign aerospace and technology firms.
Seventh	Counterespionage Intelligence Bureau	Gathering information and developing intelligence on hostile intelligence services inside and outside China
Eighth	Counterespionage Investigation	Monitoring, investigating, and apprehending foreigners (often diplomats, businessmen, and journalists) suspected of espionage in China
Ninth	Internal Protection and Reconnaissance Bureau	Protecting the MSS from infiltration by foreign entities by monitoring domestic reactionary organizations and foreign institutions
Tenth	Foreign Security and Reconnaissance Bureau	Monitoring students organizations and institutions abroad in order to investigate international anti-communist and reactionary activities, protecting overseas staff
Eleventh	China Institutes of Contemporary International Relations	Performs open-source research, translation, and analysis often meeting foreign delegations or traveling abroad as visiting fellows
Twelfth	Social Investigation Bureau	Conducting polling, surveying the population, and managing the China International Culture Exchange Center. Once the dominant bureau for US operations
Thirteenth	Network Security and Exploitation	Better known as the China Information Technology Security Evaluation Center (CNITSEC), the bureau oversees science and technology projects and China's national computer vulnerability database, the Chinese National Vulnerability Database
Fourteenth	Technical Reconnaissance Bureau	Inspecting mail and telecommunications
Fifteenth		Taiwan operations include the public-facing Institute of Taiwan Studies at the China Academy of Social Sciences
Sixteenth		
Seventeenth		
Eighteenth	United States Operations Bureau	Conducting and managing clandestine intelligence operations in and against the United States

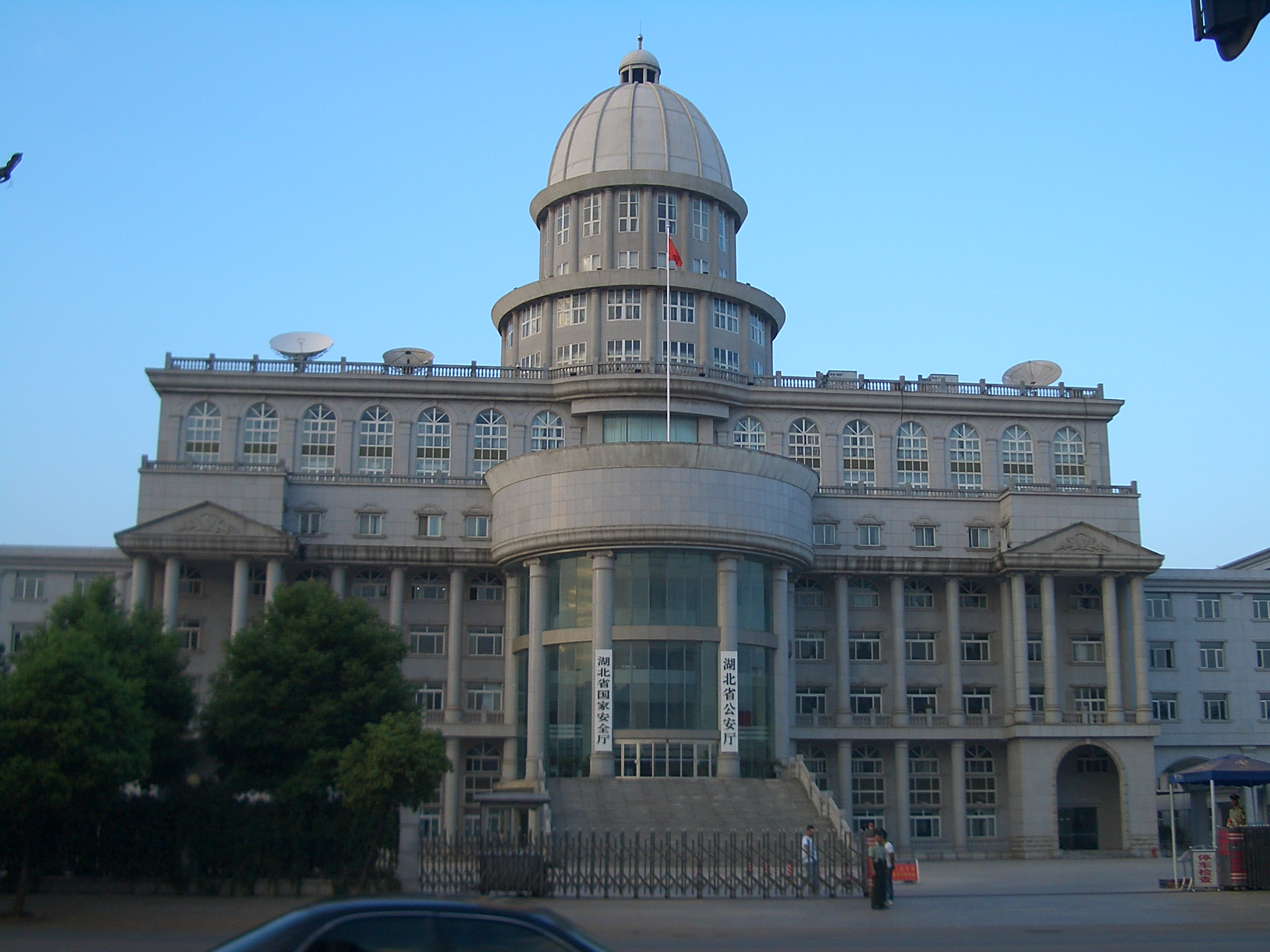
The provincial offices of the Ministry of State Security and Ministry of Public Security located in Hubei Province (Wuhan)

Many MSS personnel are trained at the University of International Relations in Haidian, due north of MSS housing and offices in Xiyuan, as well as Jiangnan Social University.

=== China Institutes of Contemporary International Relations ===
The Ministry of State Security operates the China Institutes of Contemporary International Relations (CICIR), an academic think tank on international affairs.

CICIR was the eighth bureau of the former Investigation Department (CID) of the CCP Central Committee, but became the eleventh bureau of the MSS when the CID was merged with the counter-intelligence department of the Ministry of Public Security to form the new Ministry of State Security in 1983.

Although the Chinese government has not publicly acknowledged CICIR's connection to the MSS, numerous press reports, scholars, and think tanks within and without China have detailed the relationship between the two organizations. The institute is managed by the MSS, and overseen by the CCP Central Committee. The organization itself does not speak much about its relationship with the Chinese government; however, and Chinese media reports rarely acknowledge the institution's ties with the regime.

== See also ==
- Intelligence Bureau of the Joint Staff Department
- National Security Commission of the Chinese Communist Party
- Ministry of Public Security (China)
- Chinese intelligence activity abroad
- National Intelligence Law of the People's Republic of China
- National Security Law of the People's Republic of China
- KGB, Soviet-era counterpart
