= Political Security Protection Bureau =

Chinese policy agency

Political Security Protection Bureau of the Ministry of Public Security
- 公安部政治安全保卫局
- Badge of the People's Police (Since 1983)

Agency overview
- Formed: 9 June 1949
- Jurisdiction: China
- Headquarters: 14 East Chang'an Ave, Dongcheng, Beijing
- Agency executives: Chen Siyuan, Director-General; Yin Zhitian, Political Commissar
- Parent agency: Ministry of Public Security

The Political Security Protection Bureau of the Ministry of Public Security, also known as the 1st Bureau, is a functional bureau within the Ministry of Public Security (MPS) tasked with the political security of the Chinese Communist Party (CCP).

== History ==
Before 2019, it was named the Domestic Security Protection Bureau. In 2019, the bureau was renamed the Political Security Protection Bureau.

== Functions ==
The Political Security Protection Bureau provides operational guidance to the political security police across China. The Political Security Protection Bureau is primarily responsible for combating what the Chinese government calls terrorist and separatist forces, conducting counter-espionage activities, and suppressing domestic dissidents, activists, and non-governmental organizations.

The primary mission of local bureau units are to collect and analyze intelligence, detect and act against individuals and cases that endanger social and political stability and national security, target religious and ethnic groups, strengthen security in academic institutions and state-affiliated entities, and recruit informants. Local bureaus tend to investigate major political incidents, individuals, and organizations that could pose potential threats to the CCP. The local bureaus put a priority on illegal or unregistered religious groups, cults, secret organizations, and unofficial political organizations. It is also tasked with collection of information and intelligence about targeted individuals and groups, including what it calls "enemy intelligence", "political intelligence" and "social intelligence".

== Organization ==
The director of the Political Security Bureau generally serves as a vice minister of public security. In addition to the Political Security Protection Bureau of the MPS, the provincial, municipal and county public security departments also maintain Political Security Protection Bureau units. Local units supervise the implementation of routine surveillance of targeted individuals and groups in police stations.
