= Residential Surveillance at a Designated Location =

Form of detention used in China

Residential Surveillance at a Designated Location (RSDL, Chinese: 指定居所监视居住) is a form of detention used by authorities in the People's Republic of China against individuals accused of endangering state security. The United Nations regards it as "analogous to incommunicado and secret detention and tantamount to enforced disappearance." RSDL is usually carried out at special facilities run by the Public or State Security Bureaus of China, often euphemistically called "training centers", or even hotels that have been converted into black jails. Laws regulating RSDL contain exceptions that allow the state to not inform the family members of the detained about their loved one's incarceration, while also denying detainees access to a lawyer. On the surface, the measure appears to be a softer form of detention like house arrest; but in practice the measure allows for what one journalist calls "the disappearing" of suspects into secret detention".

The measure has been used heavily since 2015 against human rights lawyers, Falun Gong practitioners and dozens of others accused of political offences, including foreigners.

Those under residential surveillance may be held for up to six months and may only speak with other parties with permission of the police; in effect this means that they may be denied legal counsel and visitation.

Residential surveillance at a designated location became available to police in 2012 when Article 73 of China's Criminal Procedure Law was amended to allow it. Articles 72 to 77 of the Criminal Procedure Law describe residential surveillance being for investigation of crimes relating to "endangering state security", "terrorism" or "serious crimes of bribery". This form of residential surveillance does not occur at the home of the suspect, but at a place designated by the police.

== Background ==
The history of Residential Surveillance at a Designated Location traces its heritage back to a related form of detention named "Residential Surveillance". In 1954, the Law on Detention and Arrest was enacted in China which included a clause that regulated Residential Surveillance. The law established Residential Surveillance as an alternative to arrest applied to those who met the requirements for arrest but could not be arrested because they were seriously ill, pregnant, or nursing a newborn. This form of detention was very rarely used by authorities; when used, the police often held people in specialized facilities as opposed to their own residences.

By 1979, Residential Surveillance was included in the first Criminal Procedure Law, which included a rough definition of the measure. According to article 38(2) of the law, residential surveillance prevents the suspect or defendant from leaving a "designated area". The vague nature of residential surveillance, regarding who it targeted and how it was enforced, resulted in a series of abuses of the system during the 1980s and 1990s. These abuses ranged from the police using residential surveillance to pressure individuals to repay debts, to the defining of the "designated area" as a room in a police station or, even a detention center. These abuses were severe enough to warrant a ruling from the Supreme People's Court in 1984, that admonished the public security apparatus for improperly enforcing residential surveillance outside the domicile of the suspect.

In the lead up to 1996 revision of the, Criminal Procedure Law many scholars suggested that residential surveillance should be abolished. Yet lawmakers chose to keep residential surveillance due to its usefulness in "certain investigation" and utility in arrests. The new revision of the Criminal Procedure Law established clearer rules for the implementation of residential surveillance, set guidelines governing when it could be applied as well as setting explicit limits on its duration. The revision to the law notably obliged the person under surveillance to remain in their home until given permission to leave and decreed that those without a "fixed domicile" could be confined to a "designated residence". Another addition of the 1996 reform was an attempt to differentiate between residential surveillance and bail, by setting different degrees of restriction on the civil liberties and mobility of the targeted person. Individuals who posted bail would be limited to the city or country they resided in while those under residential surveillance would be limited to their own domicile and be unable to meet with other people without permission. One significant oversight of 1996 reform was the failure to define "fixed domicile". This term went undefined until 1998 when the Ministry of Public Security issued regulations that defined it as being a legal residence in the jurisdiction of the public security organ investigating the suspect.

The most recent revision of the Criminal Procedure Law in 2012 again reformed residential surveillance resulting in the legal separation of residential surveillance into two forms: residential surveillance and residential surveillance at a designated location. The 2012 Criminal Procedure Law allowed for the application of RSDL, when the suspect lacked a "fixed domicile", or was accused of either endangering state security or engaging in serious bribery. Another major addition in the Criminal Procedure Law of 2012 was the crediting of time that a suspect spent under residential surveillance for any future sentences. For every two days a suspect spent in residential surveillance, one day would be subtracted from a sentence of imprisonment or penal servitude.

In 2025, Chinese authorities published the Holding Facility Detention Rules. Under these new rules, police detaining a person at a holding facility the police agency and the oversight agency must be distinct. Within 24 hours of commencement, the police agency must notify the suspect's family and defense counsel; upon validation of counsel credentials the police agency must arrange a private client meeting within 48 hours, which is not to be monitored by officials except in matters of national security or terrorism.

== Prominent persons detained under RSDL ==
Well known people detained under RSDL include artist Ai Weiwei, Nobel Peace Prize-winning poet Liu Xiaobo and Swedish bookseller Gui Minhai.

Michael Kovrig and Michael Spavor are both Canadian citizens who were detained in 2018 using RSDL. The detention of these two Canadians was allegedly in retaliation for the arrest of Huawei executive Meng Wanzhou by Canadian authorities and her resulting extradition to the United States. In a press conference on 19 March 2021 Foreign Ministry spokesman Zhao Lijian asserted that China's judicial organs handle cases independently in full accordance with China's own laws and the Vienna Convention on Consular Relations. He went on to further state that since the case involves state secrets it will not be heard in an open court, and Canadian diplomats will be unable to sit in on the trial.

Cheng Lei, prominent Australian television anchor and journalist working in China was detained on 14 August 2020, and was being held under RSDL. In September 2020 it was revealed by Chinese officials that she was accused of supplying state secrets overseas, and thus endangering China's national security. American Kai Li accused of espionage also spent ten weeks under RSDL in 2016.

== See also ==
- Forced disappearance
