= Central Special Branch =

Former Chinese intelligence service

- 中国共产党中央特别行动科
- Emblem of the Chinese Communist Party (pre-1996)

Agency overview
- Formed: November 1927
- Dissolved: 1935
- Superseding agency: State Political Security Bureau
- Type: Central Committee constituent department

The Central Special Branch (Chinese: 中央特科; pinyin: Zhōngyāng Tè Kē), abbreviated as Teke, was the intelligence and counter-intelligence agency of the Central Committee of the Chinese Communist Party (CCP) from 1927 to 1935.

== History ==
In November 1927, the CCP established its first formal intelligence service, with Zhou Enlai founding the Central Special Branch to conduct "special operations" work. With Xiang Zhongfa and Gu Shunzhang's assistance, Zhou designed the organization that many Chinese intelligence officers today see as the origins of their enterprise. Establishing secret bases across the Chinese territory, the Teke was composed of four sections led by Gu Shunzhang and Kang Sheng.

- 1st Section, General Services Section (Chinese: 总务科; pinyin: Zǒngwù Kē), was responsible for the protection and safety of CCP headquarters and leaders and included making arrangements for secret meetings. 1st Section was led by Hong Yangsheng (洪扬生).
- 2nd Section, Intelligence Section (Chinese: 情报科; pinyin: Qíngbào Kē), was responsible for intelligence and counterintelligence and led by Chen Geng (陈赓), later to become the CCP's Vice Minister of National Defense.
- 3rd Section, Operations Section (Chinese: 行动科; pinyin: Xíngdòng Kē), was the infamous "Red Guard" assassination section headed by Gu Shunzhang (顾顺章) whose "dog-beating squads" (打狗队) were tasked with killing traitors.
- 4th Section, Radio Communications Section (Chinese: 无线电通信科; pinyin: Wúxiàndiàn Tōngxìn Kē) was headed by Li Qiang (later to become PRC Minister of Foreign Trade) and responsible for communication in the underground spy network.

Zhou's primary objective was to disrupt the Kuomintang's secret police attempts to penetrate the CCP which required both a defensive counterintelligence effort to identify potentially traitorous members of the party and an offensive intelligence effort to plant spies within the Kuomintang's security and intelligence services. To prevent leaks and limit damage caused by infiltration by Nationalist spies, agents of Teke were forbidden to have any relationship with other agents making the party so compartmentalized that many never knew the name of the organization only calling it "Wu Hao's Dagger", a reference to Zhou Enlai's nom de guerre.

Based in Shanghai, Teke grew to become "a small army of messengers, people smugglers, and informers" with a constant presence in clubs, religious organizations, music groups, and brothels serving as Zhou Enlai's (and subsequently the CCP's) eyes and ears both in Shanghai and across the nation. Nonetheless, Teke had to compete with the newly established KMT Bureau of Investigation and Statistics (BIS) under the notorious Dai Li whose nickname as the "Chinese Himmler" lives on for his horrific torture record which included death in excruciating agony and forced heroin overdosing. Under Dai Li, the BIS created vast networks of 100,000 operatives across and outside the borders of China and mastered new means of intercepting communist communications — an art taught to the KMT by American cryptographer Herbert Yardley for use against the Japanese. The overwhelming advantages of the KMT were challenged only by the extensive and thorough infiltration of the security services by Teke agents including Qian Zhuangfei, Li Kenong, and Hu Di.

Gu Shunzhang, whom Zhou Enlai had chosen to head operations for Teke, would prove to be one of the most adversely consequential members of the CCP's underground intelligence ring. Having been born in Shanghai on "the wrong side of the tracks" according to French author Roger Faligot, Gu lived crudely out of bars smoking opium, having affairs, and joining the Green Gang but made a name for himself as a magician. Made a bodyguard for Mikhail Borodin, the Comintern agent and advisor to the Kuomintang from Soviet Russia, Gu was sent to Vladivostok to learn the tactics of insurrection and tradecraft of espionage as Borodin feared division between the Chinese nationalists and communists. A trained spy, Gu led Teke operations from the group's 1927 founding until 25 April 1931.

While performing the typical magic show for young children that usually covered for his espionage missions, a nationalist informer who had turned on the CCP recognized Gu from a photograph and alerted the KMT authorities. A number of KMT agents appeared and tackled Gu, not only gleeful to have detained one of their most challenging communist adversaries but were successful in turning the spymaster against the communists making Gu the most notorious intelligence traitor in modern Chinese history. As Gu provided the KMT with a flood of Teke agents' names and safe house locations, Zhou's spy inside the BIS, Qian Zhuangfei, immediately notified Zhou and Kang Shang who were able to relocate every Teke agent within two days — avoiding a potential extermination of CCP's core. Some agents, however, were located and arrested. On 21 June 1931, presumably with help from Gu's defection, the KMT captured CCP General Secretary Xiang Zhongfa hiding in a jewelry store with his cabaret dancer mistress. Despite offering to convert to the KMT party, Xiang was shot by his jailers before the received word of Chiang Kai-shek's pardon. Though the CCP's nascent intelligence branch under Kang Shang had narrowly escaped destruction, the damage done by Gu's defection and the number of communist spy arrests attrited the group until, in 1935, the CCP elected to disband it. While many of Teke's agents moved to the Red Army's Political Protection Bureau (PPB) led by Dong Fa, the PPB focused entirely on counterintelligence meaning real intelligence collection would go largely dormant until the formation of the Social Affairs Department.
