= Yidongyuan =

- 颐东苑社区
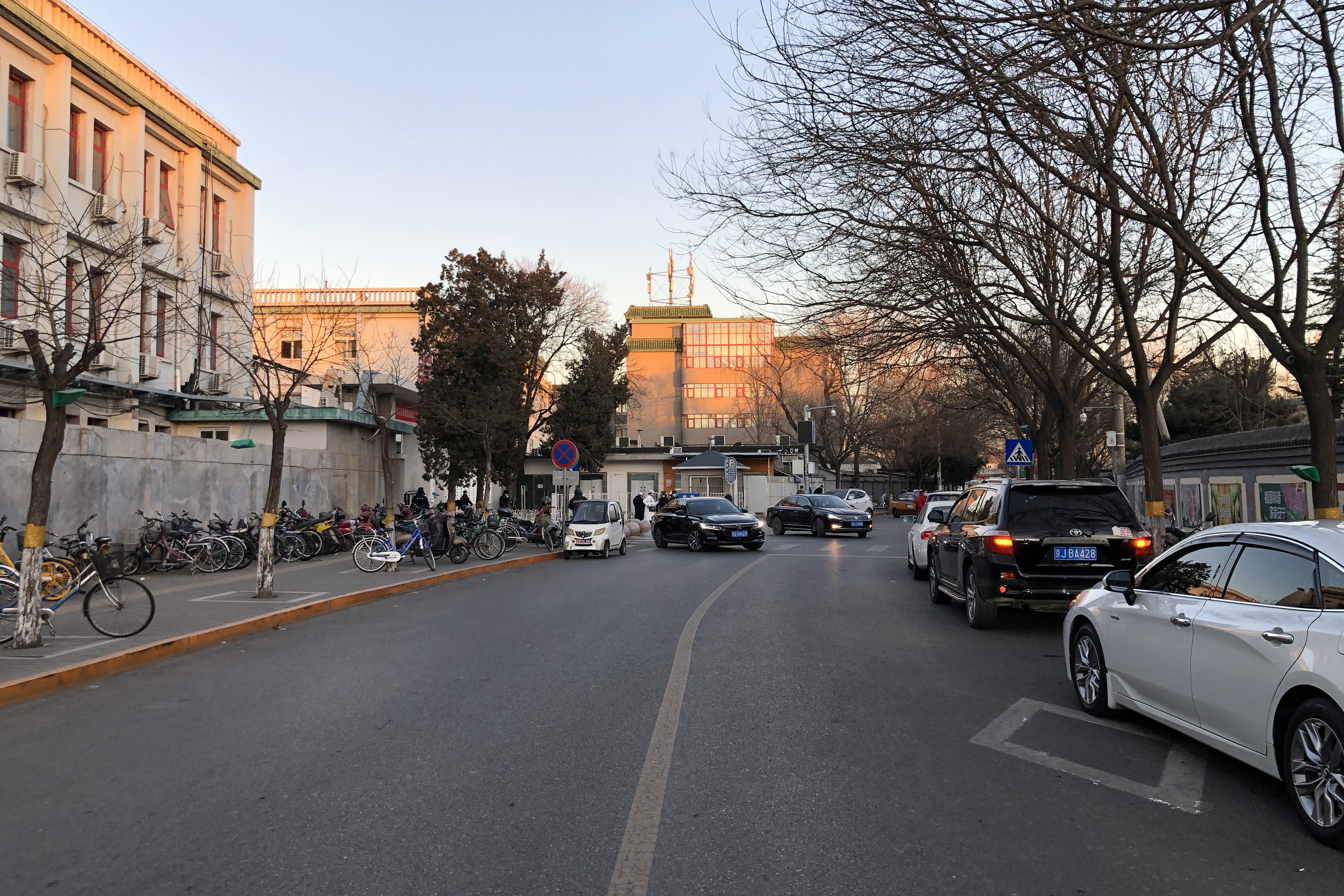
- Buildings within Yidongyuan rise above the perimeter wall at left. The camera is faced north, positioned just past the main entrance.

- Location within Beijing

General information
- Location: No. 100, Xiyuan, Qinglongqiao, Haidian District, Beijing, China
- Coordinates: 39.9920929°N 116.2782940°E
- Current tenants: Ministry of State Security
- Year built: Unknown
- Renovated: c. 1983
- Owner: Government of China

Other information
- Public transit: Train: 4 16 Xiyuan; Bus: 129, 303, 346, 432, 476, 610, 636, 671

Yidongyuan (Chinese: 颐东苑社区; pinyin: Yídōngyuàn shèqū; lit. 'East Summer Palace Garden') is a government compound in Beijing, China which serves as the headquarters of the Ministry of State Security (MSS). The facility consists of an office complex and residential community occupying a full city block in the Xiyuan area of Beijing's Haidian District. Closed to the public, and separated by a perimeter wall, the secretive nondescript facility is believed to be staffed by approximately 10,000 intelligence officers and support staff.

Unlike foreign counterparts such as the American CIA's George Bush Center for Intelligence, the SIS Building housing the British MI6, or the Lubyanka Building of Soviet KGB and Russian FSB, Yidongyuan is distinct in housing employees and their families in apartments on site.

== History ==
Prior to the establishment of the MSS, Yidongyuan served as the headquarters of its predecessor agency. It was referred to in public settings obliquely as the "Organ in the Western Garden" (中直西苑机关; Zhōngzhí xīyuàn jīguān), a reference to its location in northwestern Beijing near the Western Garden (Xiyuan). Under secure circumstances, its name in plain language was 调查 部; Diàochá bù or 中调部; Zhōngtiáo bù, meaning "Central Investigation Department" (CID). By the time the MSS was stood up in 1983, the complex of former CID buildings had been extended and modernized in preparation to accommodate the new agency.

== Facilities ==
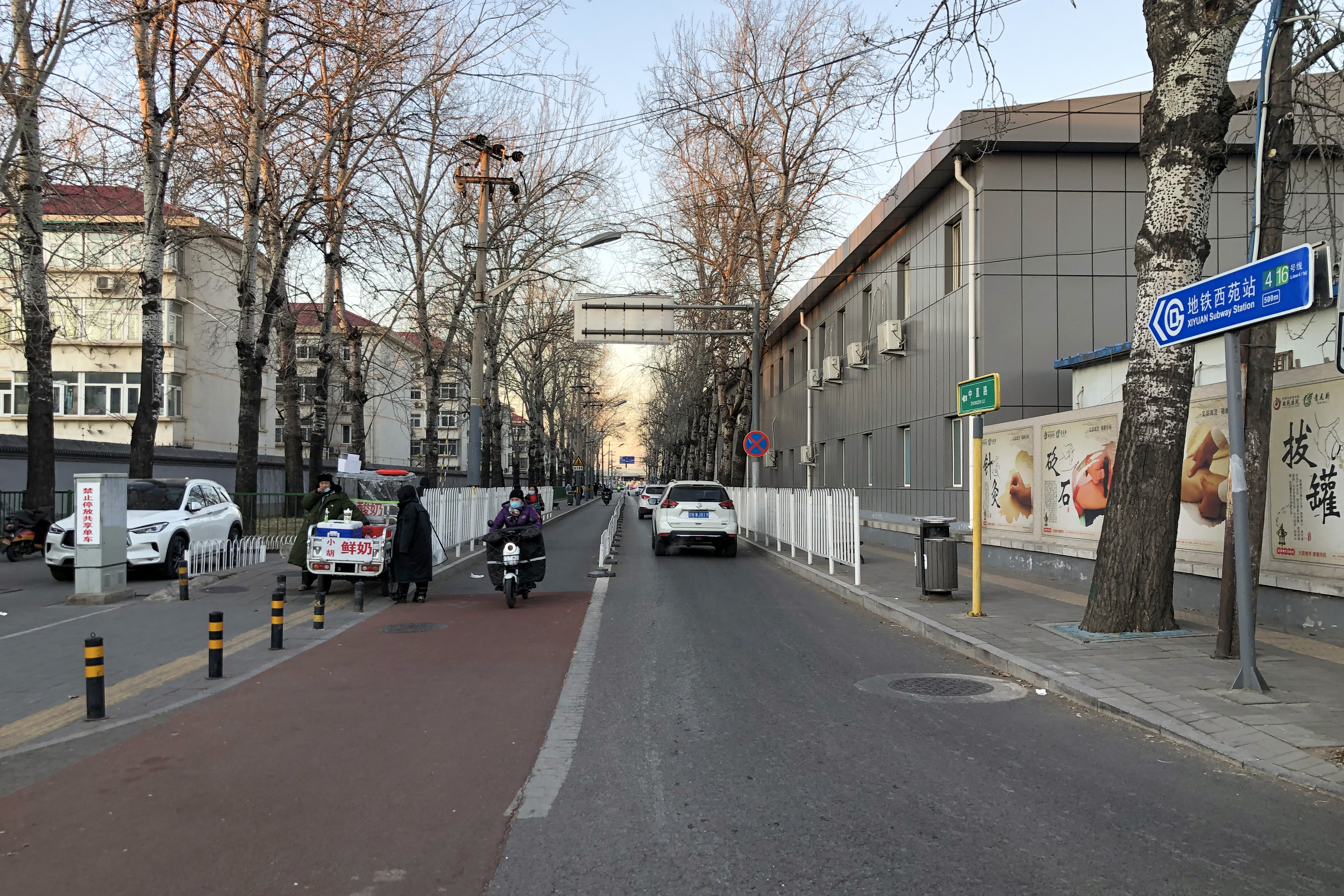
Rows of buildings within Yidongyuan can be seen above the wall left of the road. The red roofs are distinctive in satellite imagery of the facility.

The office of the minister of state security is on the seventh floor of a drab administrative building on the compound described as having architecture reminiscent of 1950s communist design.

Within the compound there is a residential apartment block called Qián mén (前门), where many of the MSS staff and their families live. The facility's administrative division code is 110108013012.

According to a notice from the State Taxation Administration, the facility contains an auto repair shop.

== Transportation ==
A study of unusual pedestrian origin-destination flows in the International Journal of Geographical Information Science examined the Haidian district, noting an abnormally large unexplained flow toward a destination in the Yidongyuan area, confirming that the facility does have a large workforce, but stopping short of naming the facility or the nature of the work carried out in it.

By car the facility can be reached by the 4th or 5th ring road, as it is situated between the two. For individuals utilizing public transit, the facility can be accessed via line 4 or line 16 of the Beijing Subway to Xiyuan station, as well as by a plethora of bus routes operated by Beijing Bus from the Xiyuan Bus Hub attached to the train station.

== See also ==
- Chinese intelligence activity abroad
