= People's Police (China) =

Civil police force of the People's Republic of China

People's Police of China 中国人民警察 Zhōngguó Rénmín Jǐngchá
- Patch of MPS People's Police

- Badge of the People's Police (since 1983)

- Flag of the People's Police (since 2020)
- Common name: People's Police (人民警察)
- Abbreviation: 民警; Mínjǐng; 'People's Police'
- Motto: "对党忠诚， 服务人民， 执法公正， 纪律严明" ("Be loyal to the Party, serve the people, be impartial in law enforcement, and strict in discipline")

Agency overview
- Formed: 19 October 1949
- Employees: 1.8–1.9 million
- Annual budget: $110 billion (est. 2019)

Jurisdictional structure
- National agency: People's Republic of China
- Operations jurisdiction: People's Republic of China
- Primary governing body: Central Committee of the Chinese Communist Party
- Secondary governing body: Central Political and Legal Affairs Commission
- Constituting instrument: People's Police Law of the People's Republic of China
- General nature: Civilian police

Operational structure
- Overseen by: National Supervisory Commission
- Headquarters: Beijing
- Official responsible: Chen Wenqing, Secretary of the Central Political and Legal Affairs Commission
- Agency executives: Wang Xiaohong, Minister of Public Security; Chen Yixin, Minister of State Security
- Parent agency: Ministry of Public Security; Ministry of State Security; Ministry of Justice; Supreme People's Court; Supreme People's Procuratorate

Facilities
- Stations: 5,000 (est.)

Notables
- Anniversary: 10 January (People's Police Day)

Website
- MPS: www.mps.gov.cn MSS: www.12339.gov.cn

The People's Police (Chinese: 人民警察; pinyin: Rénmín Jǐngchá) is the national civilian police force of the People's Republic of China. It is led by the Chinese Communist Party (CCP).

The People's Police include the People's Police of Public Security Organs, the People's Police of State Security Organs, the People's Police of Judicial Administration Organs, the Judicial Police of People's Courts, and the Judicial Police of People's Procuratorates. The Ministry of Public Security, the Ministry of State Security, the Ministry of Justice, the Supreme People's Court, and the Supreme People's Procuratorate are the highest leadership and command organs of the above-mentioned categories of People's Police, and all of them are under the leadership of the CCP's Central Political and Legal Affairs Commission. The People's Armed Police, which is led and managed by the Central Military Commission, is part of the national armed forces and does not belong to the People's Police.

== Roles ==
Police in China have a variety of roles in addition to enforcing the law.

They are also responsible for the maintenance of social stability (维护社会稳定; Wéihù Shèhùi Wěndìng), and in this sense perform not just a law enforcement function but a political function as well. The majority of national police forces are under the jurisdiction of the Ministry of Public Security (MPS).

Over the years, the power of the police has gradually been expanded to border control, under the auspices of the National Immigration Administration (NIA), household registration, issuance of the National ID card (see: Resident Identity Card) and cybersecurity (under the 11th Bureau of the MPS), network security and website registration.

== Title ==
In the PRC, People's Police refers to the identity of law enforcement officers, while Public Security or the police denotes a specific government agency, namely the public security organs. Although prison police, judicial police, and other such units also fall under the police system, due to the special nature of their work, they are generally not referred to as the police.

Before the turn of the 21st century, public security officers often used Public Security as their designation and term of address, rather than the broader term the police. Additionally, public security officers, who handle the majority of public order and criminal cases, are the most frequently encountered police force by the public. These factors have led some people, especially those in Hong Kong, Taiwan, and overseas Chinese communities, to inaccurately refer to mainland China's police officers as Public Security.

The uniforms and vehicle liveries of the People's Police generally maintain a consistent style, with their primary distinctions being the inscriptions indicating the departments to which various police forces belong, namely Public Security, Justice, State Security, Court, and Procuratorate.

== History ==
Founded in October 1949 with the inception of the People's Republic of China, and controlled by the Chinese Communist Party (CCP), China's major national police force operates under the Ministry of Public Security (MPS).

The influence of the Soviet Union was paramount in the early years of the People's Republic, and guided the Chinese approach to policing.

During the Cultural Revolution (1966–76), the powers of the police were both strengthened and weakened; on the one hand, they were given control over much of the judicial system, since People's Courts and People's Procuratorates basically collapsed, meaning that local directors of public security bureaus could easily arrest and convict almost any person they chose; on the other hand, the top leadership of the police was almost totally purged and persecuted, and political commissars from the PLA (most of them hand-picked by the Cultural Revolution Group) were brought in to take control over the largest and most important public security bureaus, including those of Beijing and Shanghai.

The current structure and mission of the People's Police was formalized in the People's Police Law of the People's Republic of China (February 1995), which states:

Tasks of the People's Police are to safeguard state security, maintain public order, protect citizens' personal safety and freedom and their legal property, protect public property, and prevent, stop and punish illegal and criminal activities. The People's Police consist of policemen working in public security organs, state security organs, prisons and organs in charge of reeducation through labor, as well as judicial policemen working in the People's Courts and the People's Procuratorates.

== Branches ==
According to the People's Police Law of the People's Republic of China (1995), the People's Police comprises five components:

- People's Police of Public Security Organs
  - Chinese: 公安机关人民警察; pinyin: Gong'ān Jīguān Rénmín Jǐngchá
  - Working under the Ministry of Public Security (MPS)
- People's Police of State Security Organs
  - Chinese: 国家安全机关人民警察; pinyin: Guójiā Ānquán Jīguān Rénmín Jǐngchá
  - Working under the Ministry of State Security (MSS)
- People's Police of Judicial Administrative Organs
  - Chinese: 司法行政机关人民警察; pinyin: Sīfǎ Xíngzhèng Jīguān Rénmín Jǐngchá
  - Working under the Ministry of Justice (MOJ)
- Judicial Police of People's Court
  - Chinese: 人民法院司法警察; pinyin: Rénmín Fǎyuàn Sīfǎ Jǐngchá
  - Working under the Supreme People's Court (SPC)
- Judicial Police of People's Procuratorate
  - Chinese: 人民检察院司法警察; pinyin: Rénmín Jiǎncháyuàn Sīfǎ Jǐngchá
  - Working under the Supreme People's Procuratorate (SPP)

=== Public Security Police ===
The Public Security Police handle routine law enforcement tasks such as maintaining public order, conducting criminal investigations, and managing border control. This constitutes the majority of China's police force and falls under the jurisdiction of the MPS.

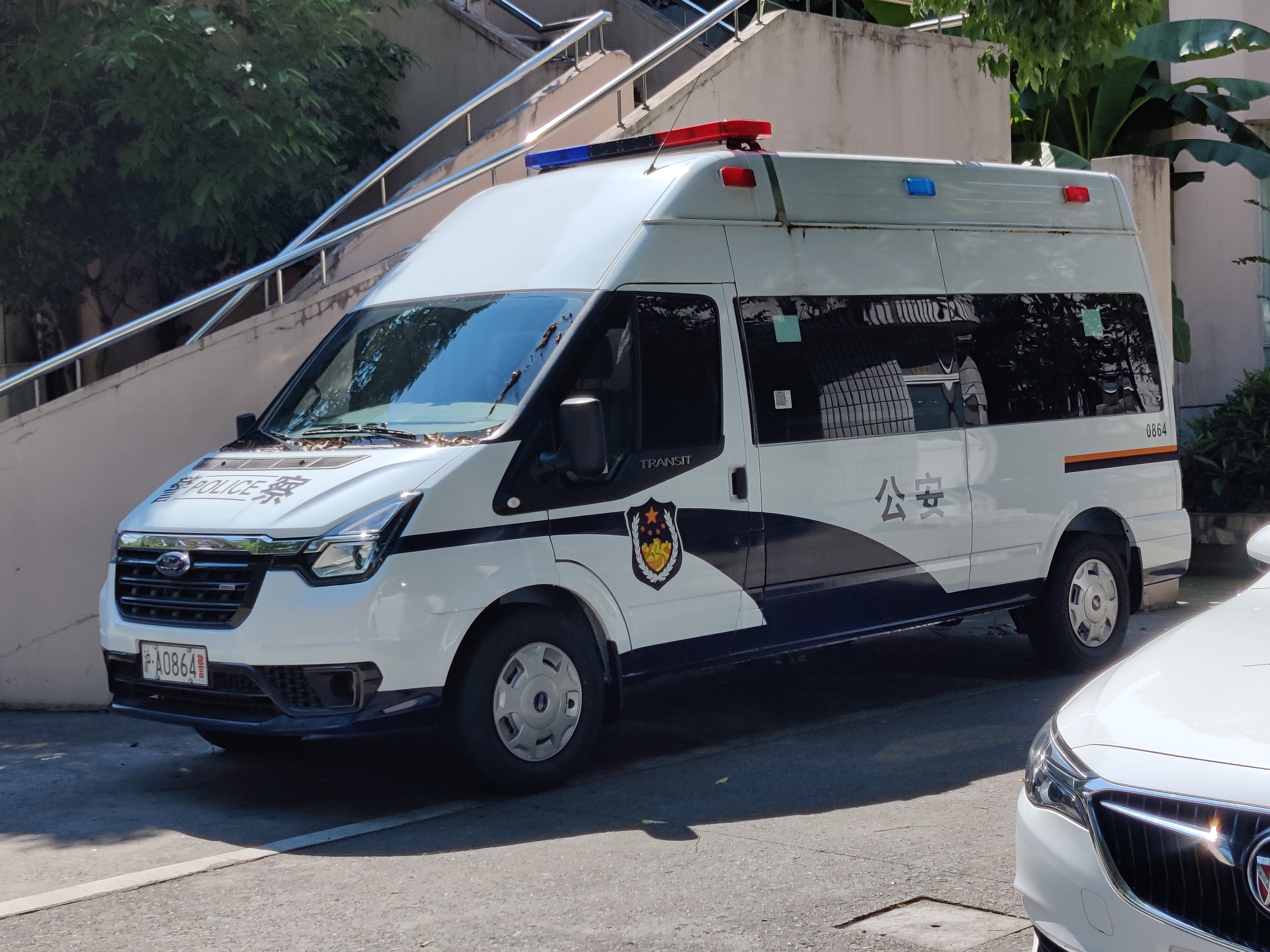
Shanghai PSB Ford Transit Pro police van

=== State Security Police ===
The State Security Police are responsible for intelligence collection and analysis, counter-espionage, political security, and also partially participate in domestic security affairs.

These officers operate under the MSS. They generally perform secret police duties and help maintain social stability and preserve the power of the ruling Chinese Communist Party.

They should not be confused with the political security police (which belong to public security organs), despite sometimes similar duties and overlapping missions.

=== Judicial Administrative Police ===
Judicial police patch

The Judicial Administrative Police consists mainly of police officers stationed in prisons and drug rehabilitation centers.

Prison Police oversee prison security, carry out prison guard duties, and aid in prison administration, similar to correctional officers in other nations.

Drug Rehabilitation Police handle the enforcement of isolation and drug rehabilitation efforts for drug addicts, along with corrective measures for minor offenders.

They should not be confused with the judicial police of the courts and procuratorates.

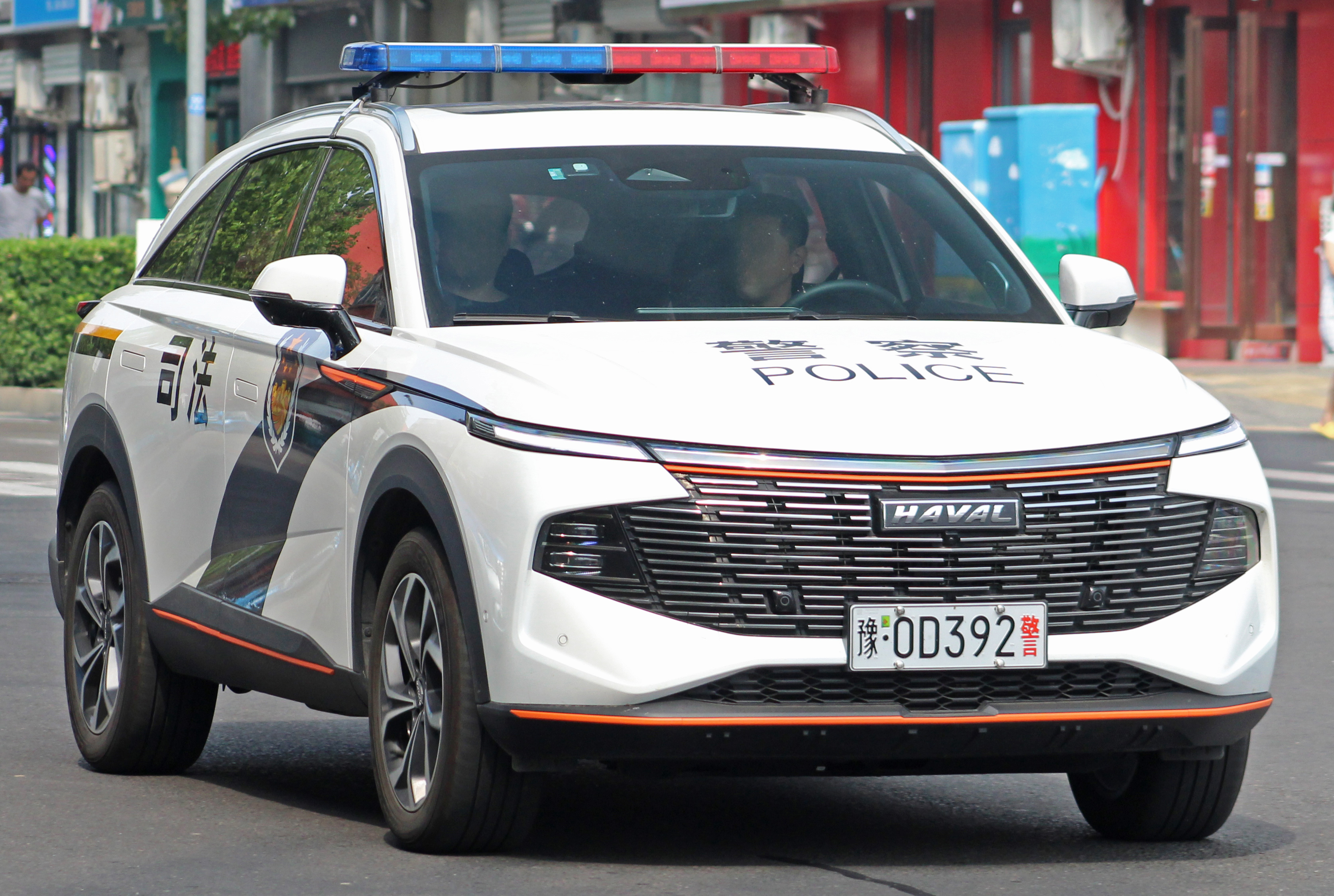
Great-Wall Haval Shenshou Judicial Administrative Police cruiser in Xigong District, Luoyang PSB, Henan province

=== Court Judicial Police ===
Court police patch

The Court Judicial Police are responsible for the security of People's Courts at the provincial, municipal, and county levels. They belong to the judicial system and have the following roles:

1. Maintaining order and security in courthouses
2. Providing law enforcement and security support during trials and other court proceedings
3. Assisting judges with courtroom procedures

=== Procuratorate Judicial Police ===
Procurate police patch

The Procuratorate Judicial Police are responsible for the security of People's Procuratorates at the provincial, municipal and county levels. They belong to the judicial system and have the following roles:

1. Conducting investigations on crimes relating to obstruction of justice and abuse of rights
2. Ensuring transparency and fairness in procuratorates
3. Providing law enforcement and security to procuratorates along with maintaining order

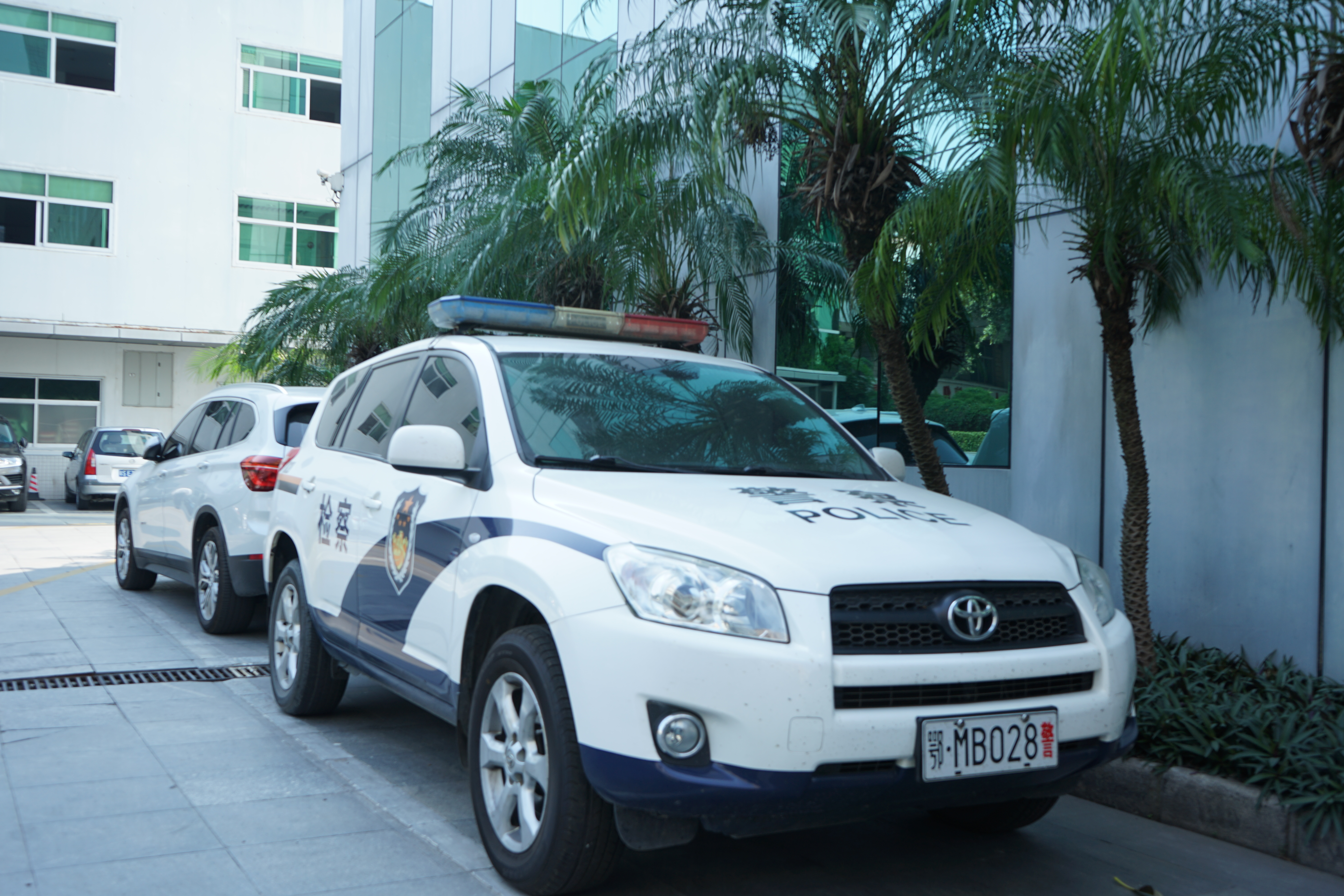
A Toyota RAV4 of the Xiantao Municipal People's Procuratorate

== Oath ==
=== Public Security Police ===
我是中国人民警察，我宣誓：坚决拥护中国共产党的绝对领导，矢志献身崇高的人民公安事业，对党忠诚、服务人民、执法公正、纪律严明，为捍卫政治安全、维护社会安定、保障人民安宁而英勇奋斗！

Unofficial English translation:

I, as a Chinese People's Police officer, swear to protect the leadership of the Chinese Communist Party, devote myself for public security duties, be loyal to the party, serve the People, be fair in law enforcement, be strict in discipline, and fight bravely to safeguard political security, maintain social stability, and protect the peace and tranquility of the People!

=== Court Judicial Police ===
我是中国人民警察，我宣誓：坚决拥护中国共产党的绝对领导，矢志献身崇高的人民司法事业，对党忠诚、服务人民、执法公正、纪律严明，为捍卫政治安全、维护社会安定、保障人民安宁而英勇奋斗！

Unofficial English translation:

I, as a Chinese People's Police officer, swear to protect the leadership of the Chinese Communist Party, devote myself for service in the People's Courts, be loyal to the party, serve the People, be fair in law enforcement, be strict in discipline, and fight bravely to safeguard political security, maintain social stability, and protect the peace and tranquility of the People!

== Ranks ==
The rank system of the People's Police is as follows:

Insignia															
Rank (Chinese)	总警监 (zǒng jǐngjiān)	副总警监 fù zǒng jǐngjiān)	一级警监 yijí jǐngjiān)	二级警监 erjí jǐngjiān)	三级警监 sānjí jǐngjiān)	一级警督 yījí jǐngdū)	二级警督 èrjí jǐngdū)	三级警督 sānjí jǐngdū)	一级警司 yījí jǐngsī)	二级警司 èrjí jǐngsī)	三级警司 sānjí jǐngsī)	一级警员 yījí jǐngyuán)	二级警员 èrjí jǐngyuán)	见习警员 jiànxí jǐngyuán)	学员 xuéyuán)
English language equivalent	Commissioner General	Deputy Commissioner General	Commissioner First Class	Commissioner Second Class	Commissioner Third Class	Supervisor First Class	Supervisor Second Class	Supervisor Third Class	Superintendent First Class	Superintendent Second Class	Superintendent Third Class	Constable First Class	Constable Second Class	Probationary Constable	Cadet

In the People's Police, ranks are separate from position, and according to Article 8 of the "People's Republic of China's Law on People's Police Ranks", the following positions require an officer with the following ranks:

- The person(s) responsible for a Ministry level agency/unit of the People's Police has to be ranked Commissioner General
- The person(s) responsible for a deputy ministry level agency/unit of the People's Police has to be ranked Deputy Commissioner General
- The person(s) responsible for a department level agency/unit of the People's police can be either ranked Commissioner First Class or Commissioner Second Class
- The person(s) responsible for a deputy department level agency/unit of the People's Police can either be a Commissioner Second Class or Commissioner Third Class
- The person(s) responsible for a division level agency/unit of the People's Police can be ranked between commissioner third class to supervisor second class
- The person(s) responsible for a deputy division level agency/unit can be ranked between Supervisor first class to supervisor third class
- The person(s) responsible for an office level agency/unit can be ranked between Supervisor 1st class to superintendent 1st class
- The person(s) responsible for a deputy office level agency/unit can be ranked between Supervisor 2nd class to Superintendent 2nd class
- Police sergeants can be ranked between Supervisor 3rd class to Superintendent 3rd class
- Police officers can be ranked between Superintendent 1st class to Constable 2nd class

== Auxiliary Police ==
Public Security Organ Police Auxiliary Officers (公安机关警务辅助人员), better known as Auxiliary Police (辅警 or 辅助警察) are often hired by local public security bureaus. According to the "Administrative Measures for Police Auxiliary Officers of Public Security Organs in Guangdong Province" (2016), article 5 states that they are not part of the People's Police (Meaning they are not Sworn officers) but are instead managed by the People's Police.

Article 8 of the Measures states that auxiliary officers have the following duties:

1. Assisting in preventing and stopping crime
2. Assisting in patrols
3. Assisting in apprehension, investigation, monitoring and guarding suspects
4. Assisting protecting order at crime scenes along with evidence and rescuing casualties
5. Assisting in traffic enforcement and conflict negotiation
6. Assisting in monitoring drug rehabilitation and confiscation of narcotics
7. Assisting in protecting jails
8. Participating in firefighting
9. Assisting in public relations and promotion of road safety and anti-drug campaigns
10. Assisting in Police interviews
11. Driving People's police automobiles, motorcycles, vessels and aircraft
12. Other duties done by auxiliary officers

Article 9 states that auxiliary officers have the following duties:

1. Organization of documents and files, receiving phone calls and other requests
2. Psychological counseling, website management, data analysis, safety tests, communications maintenance, financial analysis, non-confidential financial management and lab tests.
3. Management and repairing police equipment
4. Other duties done by auxiliary officers

Article 10 states that auxiliary officers are prohibited from the following duties:

1. Work related to national security, technical reconnaissance, Anti-Cult and anti-terrorism
2. Work related to confidential information
3. Management of evidence reports and traffic accident responsibility
4. Conducting correctional duties
5. Executive duties
6. Reviewing cases
7. Owning or using firearms or police equipment
8. Enforcing the law on their own
9. Other duties legally assigned to the People's Police

The following are not allowed to be auxiliary officers, per article 17:

1. People with a criminal record are of suspected of committed a crime who has not yet been declared innocent or guilty
2. People who have been placed in jail, juvenile detention, prostitution rehabilitation or with a history of taking drugs
3. People fired by the Ministry of State Security (or its child agencies) or their government agency
4. People whose labor contract terminated due to violating law enforcement related guidelines
5. People with extremely bad credit history
6. Other criteria which would prohibit someone from police work

=== Ranks (Sichuan) ===
The ranks of auxiliary officers are as follows in Sichuan province:

Insignia							
Rank (Chinese)	一级辅警长	二级辅警长	三级辅警长	一级辅员	二级辅员	三级辅员	实习辅警
Rank (English)	Auxiliary Sergeant First Class	Auxiliary Sergeant Second Class	Auxiliary Sergeant Third Class	Auxiliary Officer First Class	Auxiliary Officer Second Class	Auxiliary Officer Third Class	Probationary Auxiliary Officer

== See also ==
- Public Security Bureau
- People's Public Security University of China
- China People's Police University
- People's Armed Police
- SWAT China
