= Black jails =

Abusive extralegal detention centers in China

Black jails (Chinese: 黑監獄; pinyin: hēijiānyù) are a network of extralegal detention centers established by government security forces and private security companies across the People's Republic of China. They are used mainly to detain, without trial, petitioners (上访者, shangfangzhe), who travel to seek redress for grievances unresolved at the local level. The right to petition was available in ancient China, and was later revived by the communists, with important differences.

Black jails have no official or legal status, differentiating them from detention centers, the criminal arrest process, or formal sentencing to jail or prison. They are in wide use in Beijing, in particular, and serve as holding locations for the many petitioners who travel to the central Office of Letters and Calls to petition.

The jails were introduced to replace the Custody and Repatriation system after it was abolished in 2003 following the notorious Sun Zhigang incident. The existence of such jails is acknowledged by at least part of the CCP officialdom, following a police raid of one of them and criminal trial of the company running it.

According to human rights groups, black jails are a growing industry. The system includes so-called "interceptors" (截访者, literally "inquiry-stopper"), or "black guards", often sent by local or regional authorities, who abduct petitioners and hold them against their will or bundle them onto a bus to send them back to where they came from. Non-government sources have estimated the number of black jails in operation to be between 7 and 50. The facilities may be located in state-owned hotels, hostels, hospitals, psychiatric facilities, residential buildings, or government ministry buildings, among others.

== Background ==
The appearance of black jails was the authorities' response to the use of the "letters and calls" system (also known as "petitioning"), which attempts to resolve disputes at the local level.

As a modern version of the imperial tradition, reinstated by the communists after 1949, the petitioning system permits citizens to report local abuse of power to higher levels of government. Because local courts are beholden to local officials, however, and since pursuing redress through the legal system is too expensive for rural Chinese, petitioning in modern China has become the only channel for seeking redress.

The number of people using the petitioning system has increased since 1993, to the extent that the system has been strained for years. However, despite its enduring nature and political support, the system has never been an effective mechanism for dealing with the complaints brought to it – largely because it is chronically overwhelmed by the number of people seeking redress.

== Treatment of detainees ==
Human Rights Watch published a report exploring the issue. It documents how government officials, security forces, and their agents routinely abduct people, usually petitioners, off the streets of Beijing and other Chinese cities, "strip them of their possessions, and imprison them."

According to reporters visiting the jails, those detained inside them are beaten, starved, and sometimes hosed down with water. 20 or 30 people may be forced to inhabit a single room, including those suffering from disabilities.

On 15 May 2010, a guard of a black jail located in a Beijing hotel received his final judgment of eight years of imprisonment for raping a female petitioner who had been illegally held in custody.

== Official stance ==
The authorities have repeatedly denied the existence of black jails. In an April 2009 Ministry of Foreign Affairs (MOFA) press conference, an official responded to an Al Jazeera correspondent's query about black jails by stating categorically that, "Things like this do not exist in China." In June 2009, the Chinese government asserted in the Outcome Report of the United Nations Human Rights Council's Universal Periodic Review of China's human rights record that, "There are no black jails in the country."

== See also ==
- Law enforcement in the People's Republic of China
- Weiquan movement
- Indefinite detention
- Petitioning (China)
- Political prisoner
- Laogai
- Residential Surveillance at a Designated Location
