= Night in Jinling =

1985 Chinese film

Night in Jinling (Chinese: 金陵之夜) is a 1985 Chinese film. It was directed by Qian Jiang, the son of Qian Zhuangfei.

== Plot ==
In 1927, Chiang Kai-shek and the Kuomintang turned against the Chinese Communist Party (CCP) and initiated the Shanghai massacre. Qian Zhuangfei left his home in Beijing and went to Shanghai. Qian entered the service of Xu Enzeng, a cousin of Chen Lifu. In 1931, Gu Shunzhang, CCP security chief, was captured by the Kuomintang and defected, betraying many other CCP members. Qian manages to warn Zhou Enlai but is himself betrayed by Gu Shunzhang.

== Cast ==
- Kong Xiangyu as Qian Zhuangfei
- Zhu Decheng as Gu Shunzhang
- Wang Tiecheng as Zhou Enlai
- Sun Feihu as Chiang Kai-shek
- Liu Jian as Chen Lifu
- Zhu Mingzi as Zhang Zhenhua, Qian Zhuangfei's wife
- Ai Junmai as Xu Enzeng
- Qiu Hewei as Li Kenong
- Tan Tianxian as Hu Di
- Wang Biao as Cai Mengjian
