= Wu Guoqing =

Chinese forensic scientist and policeman (1936–2019)

- Traditional Chinese: 烏國慶
- Simplified Chinese: 乌国庆
Transcriptions
Standard Mandarin
- Hanyu Pinyin: Wū Guóqìng
- IPA: [ú kwǒ.tɕʰîŋ]

Wu Guoqing (simplified Chinese: 乌国庆; traditional Chinese: 烏國慶; 5 December 1936 – 24 June 2019) was a Chinese police detective and forensic scientist. He solved or helped solve many high-profile crimes, and was acclaimed as "China's Sherlock Holmes". He taught forensic science at the People's Public Security University of China, the Criminal Investigation Police University of China, and other police academies, and co-authored a number of textbooks in the field.

== Biography ==
Wu was born on 5 December 1936 in Balengguan Ranch (八楞罐牧场), Ningcheng County, Rehe Province (now in Inner Mongolia). He was a Mongol and grew up riding horses on grassland.

When he was 14, Wu was selected to receive medical training at Chengde Health School in the provincial capital Chengde. In 1954, he moved to Shanghai to study at the Shanghai Institute of Forensic Medicine. He excelled in his studies, and two years later was admitted to the four-year graduate program at the institute to study forensic science under the guidance of Soviet experts.

Wu participated in the investigation of many high-profile cases, including the Wang Zongfang and Wang Zongwei serial murders in the 1980s, the Qiandao Lake mass murder in the 1990s, the China Northern Airlines Flight 6136 arson case, the Ma Jiajue murder case, serial bombings in Xinjiang, the Shijiazhuang bombings in 2001, and the 2002 Huizhou bus arson that killed more than 30 people.

Over a career spanning more than 50 years, Wu solved about 1,000 cases. He served as chief detective of the Ministry of Public Security and was voted China's "Most Popular Police Officer" in 2011. Since the 1980s, he had been acclaimed as "China's Sherlock Holmes".

According to Wu himself, the most difficult case he solved was the Chen Ping (陈平) murder case. In September 2003, the half-naked body of Chen's wife was found in her bed at her home in Xianyang, Shaanxi. She was bound and gagged, in what appeared to be a rape-and-murder scene. After collecting and analyzing the evidence, including traces of sleeping pills in her stomach, Wu determined that it was Chen, a district prosecutor, who had killed his wife and attempted to disguise it as a rape-murder case. In January 2015, Chen was convicted of murder and sentenced to death.

Wu taught as an adjunct professor at the People's Public Security University of China, the National Police University of China, and the provincial police academies of Zhejiang, Jiangsu, Jiangxi, Yunnan, and Henan. He also co-authored a number of textbooks in forensic science.

Wu died on 24 June 2019 at Fuxing Hospital in Beijing, aged 82.
