= Yuanxi =

Yuanxi may refer to:

== Places in China ==
- Yuanxi Subdistrict (源西街道), a subdistrict of Yuancheng District, Heyuan, Guangdong
- Yuanxi, Sichuan (鸳溪), a town in Cangxi County, Sichuan

== Historical eras ==
- Yuanxi (元熙, 304–308), era name used by Liu Yuan (Han-Zhao), emperor of Han-Zhao (Former Zhao)
- Yuanxi (元璽, 352–357), era name used by Murong Jun, emperor of Former Yan
- Yuanxi (元熙, 419–420), era name used by Emperor Gong of Jin

== See also ==
- Yuan Xi (died 207), the second son of the warlord Yuan Shao
