= Jin Zhengkun =

- Born: Chinese: 金正昆; 1959 (age 66–67)
- Occupations: Academic concerned with diplomacy, communications and etiquette
- Years active: 1986-present
- Known for: "China's No. 1 professor of etiquette"

Jin Zhengkun (Chinese: 金正昆; born 1959) is a Chinese academic specializing in diplomacy, etiquette and public relations. He is the head of the Diplomacy Department of the Renmin University of China, and Director of the Center for the Study of Etiquette and Public Relations. Nicknamed "China's No. 1 professor of etiquette", he created the "Jin Zhengkun on Modern Etiquette" show, which has appeared on China Central Television and more than ten regional broadcasters in China.

Jin graduated from the Department of International Politics of Renmin University of China in 1986, and began teaching at his alma mater in September 1989. He is also a part-time professor at People's Public Security University of China and other universities.

Mainly engaged in diplomacy, communication, etiquette science research and public relations. His major works include Diplomacy, Introduction to Modern Diplomacy. He is a well-known and authoritative expert on etiquette and public relations and international business etiquette. He is also the etiquette consultant of the Protocol Department and has participated in the work of major domestic and overseas public relation and etiquette activities. He proposes “Three no worries” and “Platinum Rule” in life, which are referred to as Code of Conduct by many people. He has lectured on etiquette in CCTV Lecture Room as well as dozens of other media.

== Selected works ==
- External Affair Etiquettes (2011, Shaanxi Normal University Press)
