= Luo Yuan (admiral) =

- 罗援
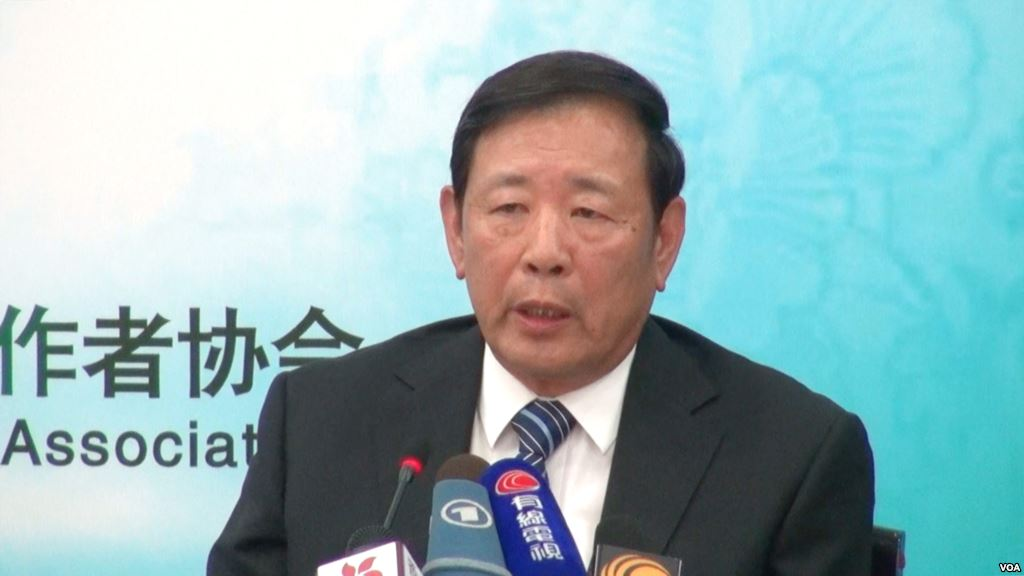
- Luo Yuan
- Born: 1950 (age 75–76); Cangxi County, Sichuan, China
- Relatives: Luo Qingchang (father)
- Military career
- Allegiance: People's Republic of China
- Branch: People's Liberation Army Navy
- Rank: Rear Admiral
- Website: weibo.com/u/1419517335

Luo Yuan (simplified Chinese: 罗援; traditional Chinese: 羅援; pinyin: Luó Yuán; born 17 April 1950), is a Chinese naval officer, author, social commentator, and military theorist at the PLA Academy of Military Science. Luo holds the rank of rear admiral in the PLA Navy. The son of Luo Qingchang, he is a supporter of communist orthodoxy and has expressed nationalist, anti-American and anti-western sentiments.

== Biography ==
Luo was born in 1950 in Cangxi County, Sichuan Province. His father Luo Qingchang was a long-time leader of Chinese security and intelligence agencies, serving as Director of the Central Investigation Department from 1973 to 1983. He has six brothers and sisters. His oldest brother, Luo Kang (罗抗), was born during the Second Sino-Japanese War. His middle brother, Luo Ting (罗挺), was born during the Chinese Civil War. His fourth younger brother is Luo Zhen (罗振).

In 1966, the Cultural Revolution was launched by Mao Zedong. Luo Qingchang was denounced by Red Guards as a capitalist roader and suffered political persecution in 1966 and 1967, but he soon returned to power thanks to his friendship with Zhou Enlai and Wang Dongxing. Luo Yuan also suffered persecution, by being sent to Yunnan Province as a soldier-farmer. In 1978, Luo Yuan secured a transfer back to Beijing.

In December 2018, Luo proposed that a possible solution to tensions with the United States in the South China Sea would be to sink one or two United States Navy aircraft carriers to break US resolve.
