= Luo Qingchang =

Chinese politician (1918–2014)

- 罗青长

5th Standing Committee of the National People's Congress
- In office March 1978 – June 1983
- Chairman: Ye Jianying

1st Central Advisory Commission
- In office 1982–1987
- Chairman: Deng Xiaoping

10th, 11th, and 12th Central Committee of the Chinese Communist Party
- In office 1973–1987

Director of the Central Investigation Department of the Central Committee of the Chinese Communist Party
- In office 1973–1983

Personal details
- Born: September 4, 1918 Cangxi County, Sichuan, Republic of China
- Died: April 15, 2014 (aged 95) Beijing, People's Republic of China
- Party: Chinese Communist Party
- Children: 4
- Education: Central Party School

Chinese name
- Traditional Chinese: 羅青長
- Simplified Chinese: 罗青长
Transcriptions
Standard Mandarin
- Hanyu Pinyin: Luó Qīngcháng

Luo Qingchang (Chinese: 罗青长; 4 September 1918 – 15 April 2014) was a Chinese politician and long-time leader of the security and intelligence services of the Chinese Communist Party, where he worked for 45 years (1938–1983), eventually serving as Director of the Central Investigation Department (the primary civilian intelligence agency) from 1973 to 1983.

== Biography ==
Luo wao born to a peasant family in Cangxi County, Sichuan, Republic of China in September 1918. He joined the Communist Youth League of China in 1932 at age 14, and the Chinese Red Army (predecessor of the People's Liberation Army) in 1934, taking part in the Long March (1934–35). Luo joined the Chinese Communist Party in 1936.

Initially working in political propaganda among young soldiers, Luo caught the eye of Wu Defeng, an experienced Communist Party intelligence agent, who recommended him to the Central Party School in Yan'an, where Luo studied from September 1937 to July 1938, receiving political and military training. Immediately afterwards, from July to December 1938, he was part of the Intelligence Training Class at Zaoyuan (near Yan'an) where some of his instructors were Soviet-trained agents. After completing the intelligence training program in December 1938, he was posted to Xi'an, under the cover of being a confidential assistant (机要秘书; jiyao mishu), though his actual duties were to work with the Party's clandestine intelligence network against both the Japanese invaders and the Chinese Nationalist government. In 1938–39 he coordinated the penetration of Kuomintang (KMT) commander Hu Zongnan's headquarters.

Luo was posted back to Yan'an in 1941 and became an intelligence analyst, earning accolades as a "living archive" (有名的活档案; you ming de huo dang'an), after coming to the attention of Mao Zedong for supplementing his intelligence reports with an encyclopedic memory. After the surrender of Japan and the start of the Chinese Civil War, Luo worked in the Central Social Affairs Department (SAD) under Kang Sheng.

After the Communist victory and the establishment of the People's Republic of China in 1949, Luo Qingchang joined the Liaison Department (which became China's primary civilian intelligence agency) working under Li Kenong. In 1955, the Liaison Department became the Central Investigation Department (CID), with Luo serving as chief of staff (秘书长; mishu zhang; 'chief secretary') and eventually, from the early 1960s, Deputy Director. During the early years of the People's Republic, Luo worked closely with Premier Zhou Enlai and with Wang Dongxing, Mao Zedong's head of security, and these two friendships would help him survive the turmoil of the Cultural Revolution relatively unscathed.

Official Chinese Communist records credit Luo with personally preventing an assassination attempt against Liu Shaoqi by Chiang Kai-Shek's Taiwanese during an official visit to Cambodia in April 1963, as well as with engineering the defection, in July 1965, of high-ranking Nationalist general Li Zongren to Beijing, which caused a sensation among overseas Chinese and was a major propaganda victory for the Communist regime.

Other important intelligence activities during the 1950s and 1960s included the funding, arming and training of dozens of Asian, African and Latin American militant groups and liberation movements. Especially in the case of Africa, Chinese intelligence "supplied, at one time or another, nearly all of the various African liberation movements with arms, money, food and medicines", although these programs were mostly run by the Intelligence Bureau of the PLA General Staff, and not by the civilian Central Investigation Department.

The Central Investigation Department also worked to combat the US trade embargo on China (in place since 1950) by collaborating with the Greek shipping billionaire Aristotle Onassis, whose ships went on to secretly carry cargo to Chinese ports in violation of the embargo.

During the early stages of the Cultural Revolution, in 1966 and 1967, Luo Qingchang was initially named as a "black element" and endured persecution by the Red Guards, but very soon he managed to escape harm and return to his duties; this was almost unique among high-ranking CID officials, and probably had to do with Luo's friendship with Premier Zhou Enlai and Wang Dongxing; nearly all leading officials of the CID were purged between 1966 and 1970.

As China and the Soviet Union became increasingly hostile and Mao Zedong played "the American card" by coming to an understanding with Richard Nixon and Henry Kissinger, Luo found himself presiding over the daily work of the CID, which officially had remained without a Director since 1967 (in 1969 it was even placed under the Intelligence Bureau of the PLA General Staff, although in practice the merger was not complete). The CID was finally reestablished in March 1973, with Luo named Director.

After the death of Mao Zedong, Luo supported Hua Guofeng, and he strongly resented Deng Xiaoping’s rise to power in the late 1970s. Deng suggested that the CID move away from diplomatic cover for its overseas officers, urging them to instead rely more on secret, illegal cover and make greater use of foreign agents; he claimed that this guidance originated with Zhou Enlai just before the Cultural Revolution. Luo openly defied Deng, dispatched additional personnel abroad under diplomatic cover, and told subordinates it was imperative to resist Deng’s "anti-party" views.

A skilled bureaucratic in-fighter, Luo managed to retain his position as intelligence chief until July 1983, when the security and intelligence reorganization program abolished the CID and replaced it with the new Ministry of State Security.

After Luo was pushed out of intelligence leadership in July 1983, he remained active as the deputy (and later as an advisor) on the Central Leading Group for Taiwan Affairs.

Luo died of an illness in Beijing on 15 April 2014, at the age of 95.

== Personal life ==
Luo had six children, his eldest child named Luo Kang (罗抗), born in the Second Sino-Japanese War; the second son named Luo Ting (罗挺), born in the Chinese Civil War; the third son named Luo Yuan, born in the Korean War, his youngest son was Luo Zhen (罗振).
