= Cross-Strait Relations Magazine Press =

The Cross-Strait Relations Magazine Press is a press organization regarding cross-strait relations. Established in July 1997, it is a subordinate unit of the Taiwan Affairs Office. It is sponsored by the Cross-Strait Relations Association and managed by the Taiwan Affairs Office. Its mission is to promote the Chinese Communist Party policy toward Taiwan and facilitate cross-strait exchanges.

== Overview ==
The organization's main tasks are to edit and publish the magazines Cross-Strait Relations and Taiwan Work Newsletter, compile and publish the Taiwan Work Yearbook, hold cross-strait cultural and educational news exchange activities, organize grassroots exchanges of experience in Taiwan-related work, contact central and local Taiwan-related media to carry out Taiwan-related publicity work, and edit and publish relevant Taiwan-related books and periodicals. The current president is Zhang Mingqing, the former vice president of the Association for Relations Across the Taiwan Straits.
