= Larry Wu-tai Chin =

Chinese spy

- Born: Chin Wu-tai; August 17, 1922; Peking, Republic of China
- Died: February 21, 1986 (aged 63); Manassas, Virginia, U.S.
- Cause of death: Suicide
- Burial place: Alta Mesa Memorial Park, Palo Alto, California, U.S.
- Education: Yenching University
- Spouse: Cathy Chin
- Children: 3
- Espionage activity
- Allegiance: China
- Agency: SAD; CIA (as a mole)
- Service years: 1944-1985

Larry Wu-tai Chin (simplified Chinese: 金无怠; traditional Chinese: 金無怠; pinyin: Jīn Wúdài; August 17, 1922 – February 21, 1986) was a Chinese Communist spy who worked for the United States government for 37 years (1944–1981), including positions at the U.S. Army and the CIA, while secretly being a mole for the Chinese Communist Party's intelligence apparatus from the very beginning. He kept passing classified documents and secret information to the People's Republic of China even after his retirement, until he was finally exposed in 1985.

Chin was one of China's most valuable foreign intelligence agents of the entire Cold War period; he supplied the PRC with top-secret information on American foreign policy initiatives relating to China, as well as biographical profiles of CIA agents. In 1970, he passed CIA documents to Mao Zedong and Zhou Enlai regarding President Richard Nixon's desire to open relations with the PRC; Mao therefore knew about Nixon's intentions well in advance of his diplomatic overtures, which allowed him to alter his policy (such as the volume of anti-American rhetoric in the state-controlled Chinese press) in order to extract the maximum political concessions from the Americans. Chin was a naturalized U.S. citizen.

== Early life ==
Born as Chin Wu-tai in Peking, Republic of China, in 1922, he attended Yenching University.

Chin was recruited by the Chinese Communist intelligence apparatus (then called the Central Social Affairs Department, or SAD) in 1944, during World War II. He was specifically directed to find employment in an American government agency (at the time, the Nationalist Government of Chiang Kai-shek was working closely with the Americans against Japan). Chin, who spoke English well, was hired by the United States Army, and was appointed to work as a translator of Chinese language at the U.S. Army Liaison Office in the city of Fuzhou.

From 1945 to 1949 Chin was a translator for the U.S. Consulate in Shanghai, and from 1949 to 1950 for the U.S. Consulate in Hong Kong (then under British rule). During this time, he passed countless classified documents to the Chinese Communist intelligence service directed by Li Kenong during the early years of the PRC and was named first the Liaison Department and later the Central Investigation Department. Chin was regularly and highly paid for his services.

== Korean War ==
Chin served as a Chinese translator in the U.S. Army during the Korean War, helping to debrief Chinese and North Korean prisoners of war. He misrepresented the intelligence that he was translating from captured Chinese soldiers resulting in the loss of U.S. forces and missed tactical opportunities. Many of these Chinese soldiers intended to defect to South Korea. He also provided the Chinese government with the names of captured Chinese soldiers who were revealing information or declared themselves opposed to Communist Party rule and intended to defect. The Chinese then specifically requested these soldiers by name to be released back to China before the armistice negotiations could take place. This delayed the negotiations process for over a year.

== Penetrating the CIA ==
Following his U.S. Army service, Chin applied to and was accepted by the CIA. He was assigned as a Chinese language translator and analyst of the Chinese Communist press at the Foreign Broadcast Information Service (FBIS), where he continued his espionage for China. He was posted in Okinawa (1952–61), Santa Rosa, California (1961–71) and Rosslyn, Virginia (1971–81). According to No Kum-Sok, the North Korean pilot who defected with a MiG-15, Larry Chin was one of his CIA handlers after his defection.

As an FBIS analyst and one of the CIA's few fluent Chinese linguists, Chin was able to pass along such information as Intelligence Information Reports (IIRs) on China and East Asia, biographical profiles and assessments of fellow CIA employees, and the names and identities of the Agency's covert agents. He was also in a position to provide information about recruited deep-cover agents in China. Due to the CIA's policy of internal compartmentalization, Chin did not know their real names or identities; however, based on the intelligence they provided, he could infer such things as their locations, employers, and levels of access. Chinese counterintelligence could then attempt to identify them by determining who had access to what information. Once the agents were identified, they would routinely be arrested and executed, or, alternatively, fed false information to be communicated to the CIA. Most significantly, in 1970 Chin provided to the Maoist leadership in Beijing CIA documents that revealed the plans of President Richard Nixon to engage China in order to form a tactical alliance against (and put pressure on) the Soviet Union. Mao, knowing in advance of American designs and objectives, could squeeze maximum concessions from the Nixon administration.

== Exposure ==
Only five years later did any allegation of espionage arise. In 1985, Yu Qiangsheng, a high-ranking Chinese intelligence official, defected to the United States and exposed Chin's espionage identity. On November 23, 1985, Chin was arrested. He was held at the Prince William County, Virginia, jail, as the United States Marshal's Service typically places espionage suspects in Washington, DC-area county jails.

The first espionage count accused Chin of having conspired with Chinese intelligence agents to transmit defense-related documents potentially damaging to U.S. interests or advantageous to those of China. The second espionage count charged Chin specifically with having transmitted to a foreign agent in 1952 information about the location of prison camps in Korea where Chinese prisoners were held.

== Death ==
On the day of his sentencing, when guards arrived at Chin's cell in the Prince William-Manassas Regional Adult Detention Center to transport him to court, they found him lifeless with a garbage bag over his head. An autopsy concluded that Chin had committed suicide in his cell. Shortly prior to his suicide, the Chinese consul made an authorized visit and informed him that the Chinese government would provide for the needs of his family if he died without revealing his secrets. His body was buried in Alta Mesa Memorial Park in Palo Alto, California.

A cenotaph believed to be for Chin was found in Fragrant Hills in Beijing by a visitor passing by in 2017.

== Impact ==
Chin was one of China's most important foreign intelligence assets of the Cold War era. Due to his services, the Chinese government was able to extract the maximum political concessions from Richard Nixon in return for a tactical alliance against the Soviet Union. The majority of CIA agents in China were compromised and executed, or fed false information to be reported back to the Agency, and the Chinese leadership could have determined how accurate were U.S. intelligence assessments concerning the PRC's intelligence, political, economic, and military infrastructures.

== See also ==
- Chinese intelligence operations in the United States
