= Taiwan Affairs Office =

Administrative agency of the State Council of China

- 国务院台湾事务办公室 中国共产党中央台湾工作办公室
- Logo of the Taiwan Affairs Office of the State Council

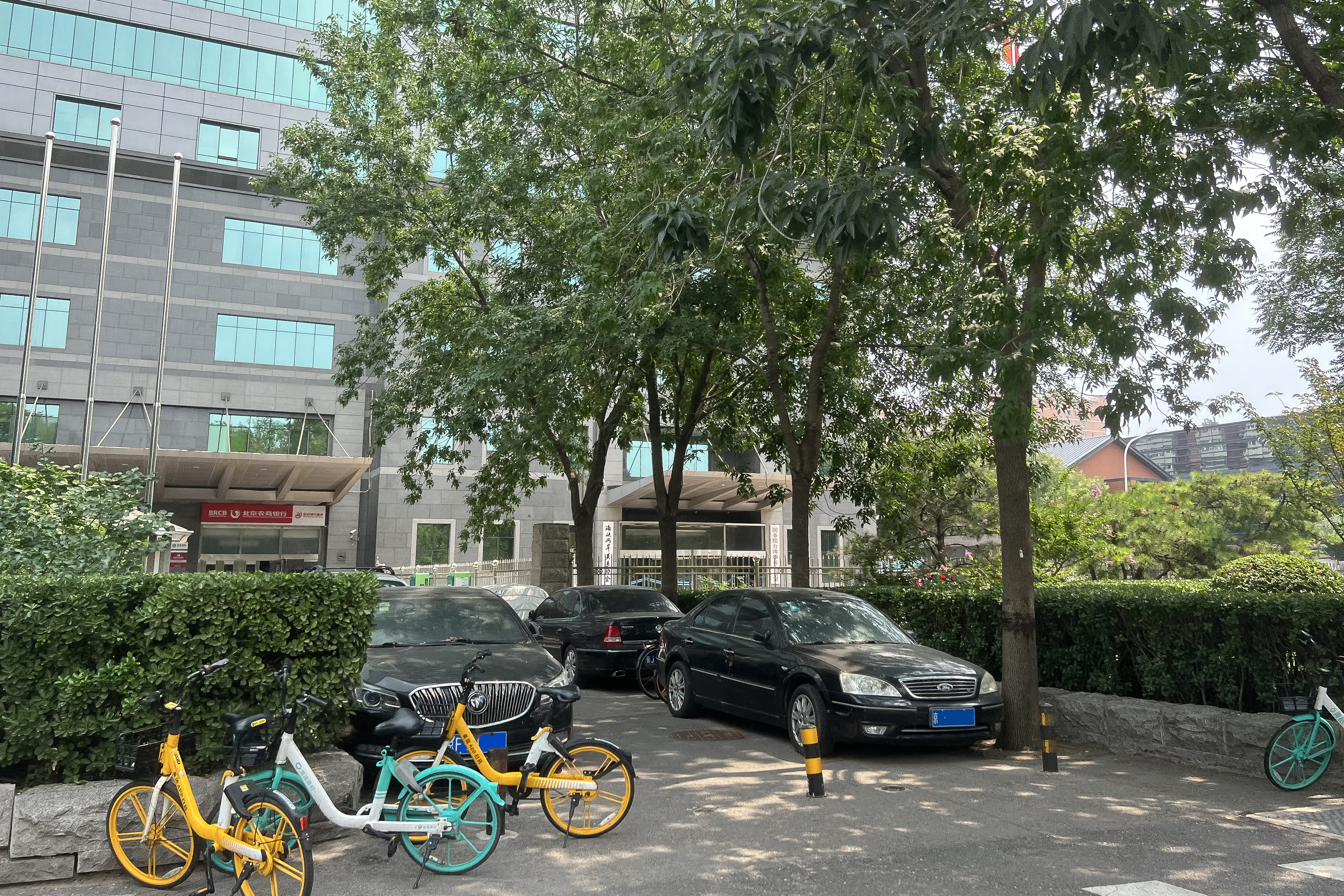
- Headquarters

Agency overview
- Formed: 1955 (party); 1988 (state)
- Preceding agency: People's Bureau of Unification (1955–1988)
- Type: Ministerial level agency
- Jurisdiction: People's Republic of China
- Headquarters: 6-1 Guang'anmen South Street, Xicheng District, Beijing
- Agency executives: Song Tao, Director; Zheng Lizhong Sun Yafu Ye Kedong Chen Yuanfeng, Deputy Directors
- Parent agency: Central Leading Group for Taiwan Affairs
- Child agency: Association for Relations Across the Taiwan Straits
- Website: www.gwytb.gov.cn

Taiwan Affairs Office of the State Council
- Simplified Chinese: 国务院台湾事务办公室
- Traditional Chinese: 國務院臺灣事務辦公室
- Literal meaning: State Affairs Court Taiwan Affairs Office
Transcriptions
Standard Mandarin
- Hanyu Pinyin: Guówùyuàn Táiwān Shìwù Bàngōngshì

Acronym
- Simplified Chinese: 国台办
- Traditional Chinese: 國臺辦
- Literal meaning: State Taiwan Office
Transcriptions
Standard Mandarin
- Hanyu Pinyin: Guótáibàn

The Taiwan Affairs Office is a ministerial-level office under the State Council of the People's Republic of China (PRC). It is responsible for cross-strait relations and sets and implements guidelines and policies related to Taiwan, which is claimed by the People's Republic of China as a province of its own. The agency is not affiliated with the de facto government ruling Taiwan (Republic of China).

Under the "one institution with two names" arrangement, it is also the Chinese Communist Party's Taiwan Work Office of the Central Leading Group for Taiwan Affairs under the CCP Central Committee; the party title is used for party-to-party interactions with Taiwan.

== History ==
In July 1954, the Central Committee of the Chinese Communist Party decided to establish the Central Taiwan Affairs Group. The group and its office were established in 1955. The office was located in the Central Investigation Department, with Qi Yanming as its director, while Yang Yindong was responsible for specific work. During the later period of the Cultural Revolution, Yang concurrently served as the deputy director of the Office of the Central Taiwan Affairs Leading Group, and cooperated with central departments to participate in the amnesty of war criminals and armed agents in Taiwan, the cleanup of prisons, the lenient release of Kuomintang personnel above the county and regimental level, the implementation of the policy of surrendering and uprising personnel, and the handling of rightist work for a total of five years.

In December 1979, the Central Leading Group for Taiwan Affairs was reinstated. At the end of 1979, Deng Xiaoping personally presided over the work on Taiwan, and Deng Yingchao and Liao Chengzhi were put in charge of the Central Leading Group for Taiwan Affairs. The Office of the Central Leading Group for Taiwan Affairs was listed as a unit directly under the Central Committee, with Yang Yindong serving as deputy director. In the spring of 1982, he became director, ultimately leaving the office in September 1985. In November 1987, Taiwanese President Chiang Ching-kuo decided to open up visits to relatives in mainland China for veterans in Taiwan, thus opening up exchanges between Taiwanese residents and mainland Chinese residents that were stopped for decades. This led to the return of veterans of the Republic of China to their hometowns in mainland China, as well as the visits by Taiwanese residents to mainland China, cross-strait economic and trade exchanges and investments, marriage, property inheritance and other Taiwan-related affairs, leading the Office of the Central Leading Group for Taiwan Affairs to be no longer able to adapt to the new situation.

In 1988, the CCP Central Committee decided to entrust Vice Premier Wu Xueqian and Ding Guangen to organize a government Taiwan affairs work agency with administrative and management functions, leading to the formation of the Taiwan Affairs Office of the State Council. On September 9, 1988, the executive meeting of the State Council decided to establish the office. In October 1988, Wu Xueqian, Ding Guangen, Li Qingzhou, Geng Wenqing, Tang Shube, and An Min met in Beidaihe. Wu Xueqian conveyed the decision of the Central Committee on the establishment of the State Council Taiwan Affairs Office and asked the participants to report on the situation, tasks and staffing of their respective departments' Taiwan work. They also asked for opinions on the tasks, organizational structure, staffing and relationship with the existing Taiwan work departments of the central and state organs. On 30 October 1988, the General Office of the State Council issued a notice which stipulated that "the Taiwan Affairs Office is the agency of the State Council to handle Taiwan affairs" and appointed Ding Guangen as the director of the Taiwan Affairs Office, with Sun Xiaoyu and Chen Zonggao as deputy directors.

On 31 May 1989, the State Council appointed Tang Shubei as the deputy director of the Taiwan Affairs Office. At the time, the Taiwan Affairs Office had very few staff members, and was divided into five groups: the secretariat group, the research group, the liaison group, the economic group, and the exchange group. Sun Xiaoyu was in charge of the liaison group, Chen Zonggao was in charge of the secretariat group and the economic group, and Tang Shubei was in charge of the research group and the exchange group. Ding Guangen often convened these three deputy directors, and sometimes the heads of each group, to hold meetings in Ding Guangen's conference room. On 18 January 1990, deputy director Tang Shubei spoke to Xinhua News Agency reporters on the institutional functions of the Taiwan Affairs Office. Tang said that the Taiwan Affairs Office, "as the office of the State Council to handle Taiwan-related affairs", will "actively organize, guide, manage and coordinate the Taiwan-related work of the State Council departments, provinces, autonomous regions and municipalities directly under the Central Government, and promote the gradual easing of cross-strait relations and the further development of mutual exchanges". Among them, "organizing, guiding, managing and coordinating" is called the "eight-character policy" by the Taiwan Affairs Office system. This is the function approved by the Central Committee when Wu Xueqian and Ding Guangen created the State Council Taiwan Affairs Office, which continues to this day.

On 27 March 1991, the Central Committee and the State Council decided to merge the former Central Leading Group for Taiwan Affairs and the State Council Taiwan Affairs Office to form the CCP Central Committee Taiwan Affairs Office. This office was also the State Council Taiwan Affairs Office, which was one institution with two names and was listed as a direct institution of the Central Committee. The Central Leading Group for Taiwan Affairs was directly led by the CCP Politburo Standing Committee, and its daily work was undertaken by the Central Committee Taiwan Affairs Office. In this merger, with the approval of the Central Committee and the State Council, the Office of the Central Leading Group for Taiwan Affairs merged with the State Council Taiwan Affairs Office headed by Wang Zhaoguo. Wang Zhaoguo served as the director of both the Central Committee Taiwan Affairs Office and the State Council Taiwan Affairs Office. Under Wang Zhaoguo's efforts, the staff increased and 10 bureaus were established, which were later slightly adjusted.

From 5 to 7 March 1993, the second plenary session of the 14th CCP Central Committee was held in Beijing, which adopted the "Plan on the Reform of Party and Government Institutions". On 2 July 1993, the Central Committee issued the "Notice on Issuing the 'Plan for the Reform of Party and Government Institutions' and the 'Implementation Opinions on the Plan for the Reform of Party and Government Institutions'". Among the adjusted institutions directly under the CCP Central Committee as determined by the "Plan", the Taiwan Affairs Office of the Central Committee and the Taiwan Affairs Office of the State Council are one institution with two names and are included in the list of institutions directly under the CCP Central Committee. On 24 June 1993, the Central Committee decided to establish the Central Leading Group for Taiwan Affairs. The Taiwan Affairs Office of the Central Committee and the Taiwan Affairs Office of the State Council became the working bodies of the leading group.

In July 1999, the Taiwan Affairs Office established the Taiwan.cn news website. In 2007, the Taiwan Affairs Office established the Association of Taiwan Investment Enterprises on the Mainland (ATIEM), consisting of Taiwanese businesses operating in Mainland China. Prior to the 2012 Taiwanese legislative and presidential elections, ATIEM organized discounted flights to Taiwan for Taishang to vote in Taiwanese elections. In October 2025, Taiwan Affairs Office established a Facebook page where it issued bounties on key Taiwanese political figures. In the same month, it announced that it would start giving weekly press conferences from 25 October, doubling from the earlier biweekly schedule.

== Functions ==
The office promotes Chinese unification and manages activities pertaining to the relationship across the Taiwan Strait and which may require interfacing with the government of Taiwan. These include: preparing for negotiations and agreements; direct mail, transport and trade links; propaganda and political influence work related to Taiwan; controlling and censoring media and public relations; handling major incidents; economic planning; intergovernmental exchanges and cooperation; personnel exchanges, observers and symposia; preparing meetings with Taiwanese politicians and officials; and work for international conferences involving Taiwan. It also manages a wide range of exchanges between mainland China and Taiwan in cultural, economic, and scholarly areas.

== Organization ==
The State Council's Notice on the Establishment of Institutions states that the Taiwan Affairs Office of the State Council and the Taiwan Affairs Office of the CCP Central Committee are one institution with two names and are listed in the list of institutions directly under the CCP Central Committee. The office has the following organizations:

=== Internal organization ===
- Secretariat
- General Affairs Bureau
- Research Bureau
- Government Information Office
- Economic Bureau
- Bureau of Taiwan Affairs of Hong Kong and Macao
- Exchange Bureau
- Liaison Office
- Legal Affairs Bureau
- Complaints Coordination Bureau
- Political Party Bureau
- Party Committee (Personnel Bureau)

=== Directly affiliated public institutions ===
- Government Service Center
- Information Center
- Cross-Strait Relations Research Center
- Cross-Strait Exchange Center
- Cross-Strait Economic and Technological Cooperation Center
- Jiuzhou Cultural Communication Center
- National Training Center for Taiwan Affairs Cadres

=== Directly affiliated enterprises ===
- Beijing Straits Cultural Exchange
- Jiuzhou Publishing

=== Social organizations ===
- Association for Relations Across the Taiwan Straits
- National Society of Taiwan Studies
- China Council for the Promotion of Peaceful Reunification
- Cross-Strait Marriage and Family Association

== List of directors ==
Directors of the Central Committee Taiwan Affairs Office
Name	Duration of Office
Qi Yanming	1955 – 1966
Luo Qingchang	1978 – 1982
Yang Yindong	1982 – September 1985
Yang Side	1985 – March 1991

Directors of the State Council Taiwan Affairs Office
Ding Guangen	30 October 1988 – 16 November 1990
Wang Zhaoguo	16 November 1990 – 9 December 1996
Chen Yunlin	9 December 1996 – 3 June 2008
Wang Yi	3 June 2008 – 17 March 2013
Zhang Zhijun	17 March 2013 – 19 March 2018
Liu Jieyi	19 March 2018 – 28 December 2022
Song Tao	28 December 2022 –

== List of spokespersons ==
Spokespersons of the Taiwan Affairs Office
Name	Duration of office	Ref.
Zhang Mingqing	September 2000 – 27 October 2004	
Li Weiyi	March 2002 – 17 December 2008	
Yang Yi	January 2007 – 25 September 2013	
Fan Liqing	January 2007 – 27 May 2015	
Ma Xiaoguang	January 2014 – June 2023	
An Fengshan	October 2015 – July 2019	
Zhu Fenglian	November 2019 – present	
Chen Binhua	June 2023 – present	
Wu Xi	December 2024 – present	
Peng Qing'en	October 2025 – present	
Zhang Han	November 2025 – present	

== See also ==
- Mainland Affairs Council, counterpart body in Taiwan
- Taiwan Province, People's Republic of China
- United front in Taiwan
- Hong Kong and Macau Work Office
