= Peng Qing'en =

- 彭庆恩

Spokesperson for the Taiwan Affairs Office
- Incumbent
- Assumed office 29 October 2020

Personal details
- Born: January 1969 (age 56) Ye County, Henan, China
- Party: Chinese Communist Party

Chinese name
- Simplified Chinese: 彭庆恩
- Traditional Chinese: 彭慶恩
Transcriptions
Standard Mandarin
- Hanyu Pinyin: Péng Qíng'ēn

Peng Qing'en (Chinese: 彭庆恩; born January 1969) is a Chinese politician.

== Early life and education ==
Peng Qing'en was born in Ye County, Henan, in January 1969. He holds a postgraduate degree with a Master of Laws. Peng joined the Chinese Communist Party (CCP) in January 1994 and began his political career in July 1995.

Peng has spent much of his career in various bureaus of the Taiwan Affairs Office of the State Council, including the Research Bureau, the General Office, and the Economic Bureau. Previously, he served as vice mayor of Hefei Municipal People's Government in Anhui.

On 29 October 2025, Peng was appointed as the new spokesperson for the Taiwan Affairs Office.
