= Taishang =

Informal term for Taiwanese businesspeople in China

Taishang (Chinese: 臺商; pinyin: Tái Shāng) are Taiwanese businesspeople operating in mainland China. The tai part of the term stands for Taiwan, and the shang part stands for business or businessperson. There are no official statistics on the number of Taishang working in mainland China. Unofficial estimates circulating in 2011 suggested that between 1 million and 3 million Taiwanese nationals (including family members) lived in mainland China.

== Economic impact ==
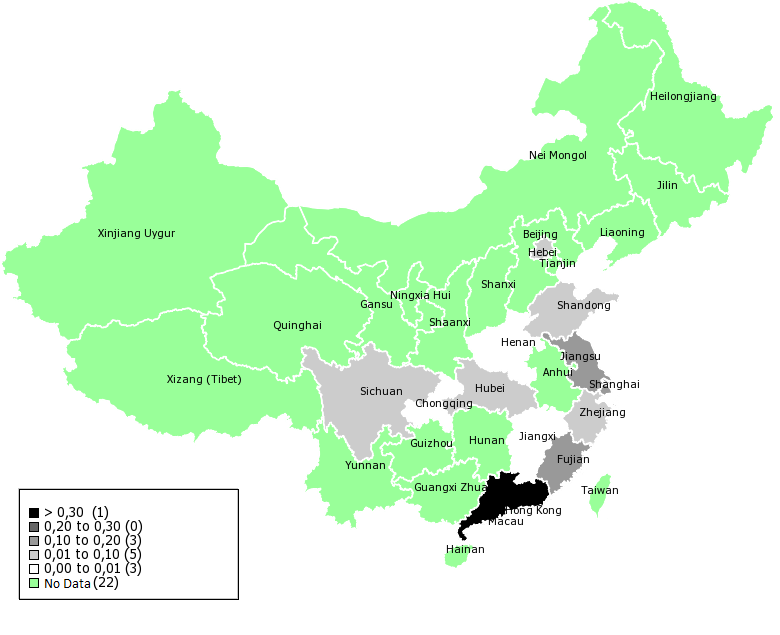
Taiwan-approved investments in Mainland China by cases accumulation from 1991 to 2014

The more Taiwanese capital is invested in the mainland, the more it becomes part and parcel of China's growing economy. Therefore, the Taishang are a major force in the economic integration of China with the larger world-economy.

After the economic reform escalated, China has attracted a huge amount of direct investments from Taiwan and concomitantly a large number of Taiwanese entrepreneurs, managers, and professionals moved to China. China replaced the US as the top destination for Taiwanese exports in 2003.

The change of government in Taiwan in May 2008 and the economic crisis that took hold of coastal China in late 2008 and continued throughout 2009, forced many factories in Taiwan to close down or relocate to other countries. This led to a large increase in the number of Taishang in mainland China.

As of the end of 2008, China's Ministry of Commerce (MOC) reported Taiwanese direct investment (TDI) in China to be US$47.7 billion; Taiwan's Ministry of Economic Affairs (MOEA) Investment Commission (hereafter, Investment Commission) announced a total investment value of US$75.6 billion; Taiwan's Mainland Affairs Council (MAC) estimated the amount at between US$100 billion and US$150 billion; many private sectors in Taiwan estimated the amount to be between US$100 billion and US$200 billion.

== Political impact ==
Collectively, the Taishang are seen as an important group in Taiwanese politics and are widely perceived to be supportive of deeper economic integration between Taiwan and mainland China. Taishang as a group is widely assumed to be supportive of the Kuomintang also known as the Chinese Nationalist Party. Prior to the 2012 Taiwanese legislative and presidential elections, an organization controlled by the Chinese government's Taiwan Affairs Office, Association of Taiwan Investment Enterprises on the Mainland (ATIEM), organized discounted flights to Taiwan for Taishang to vote in elections.

A preliminary 2010 study suggests that most Taishang are apolitical. They favor greater economic integration of Taiwan and China but prefer having strong ties with mainland politicians only at the local level. They tend to nurture a parallel taishang society, and their identity can be described as "situational".
