= Ministry of Public Security (China) =

Chinese government security body

Ministry of Public Security of the People's Republic of China 中华人民共和国公安部 Zhōnghuá Rénmín Gònghéguó Gōng'ānbù
- Patch of the Ministry of Public Security

- Badge

- Flag
- Abbreviation: MPS
- Motto: Be loyal to the Party, Serve the People, Be impartial in law enforcement, and strict in discipline

Agency overview
- Formed: 1949 (Current form 1954)

Jurisdictional structure
- National agency: China
- Operations jurisdiction: China
- Governing body: Central Political and Legal Affairs Commission
- General nature: Civilian police

Operational structure
- Headquarters: No. 14 East Chang'an Street, Beijing,100741
- Sworn members: 1.9 million
- Agency executive: Wang Xiaohong, Director

Website
- www.mps.gov.cn

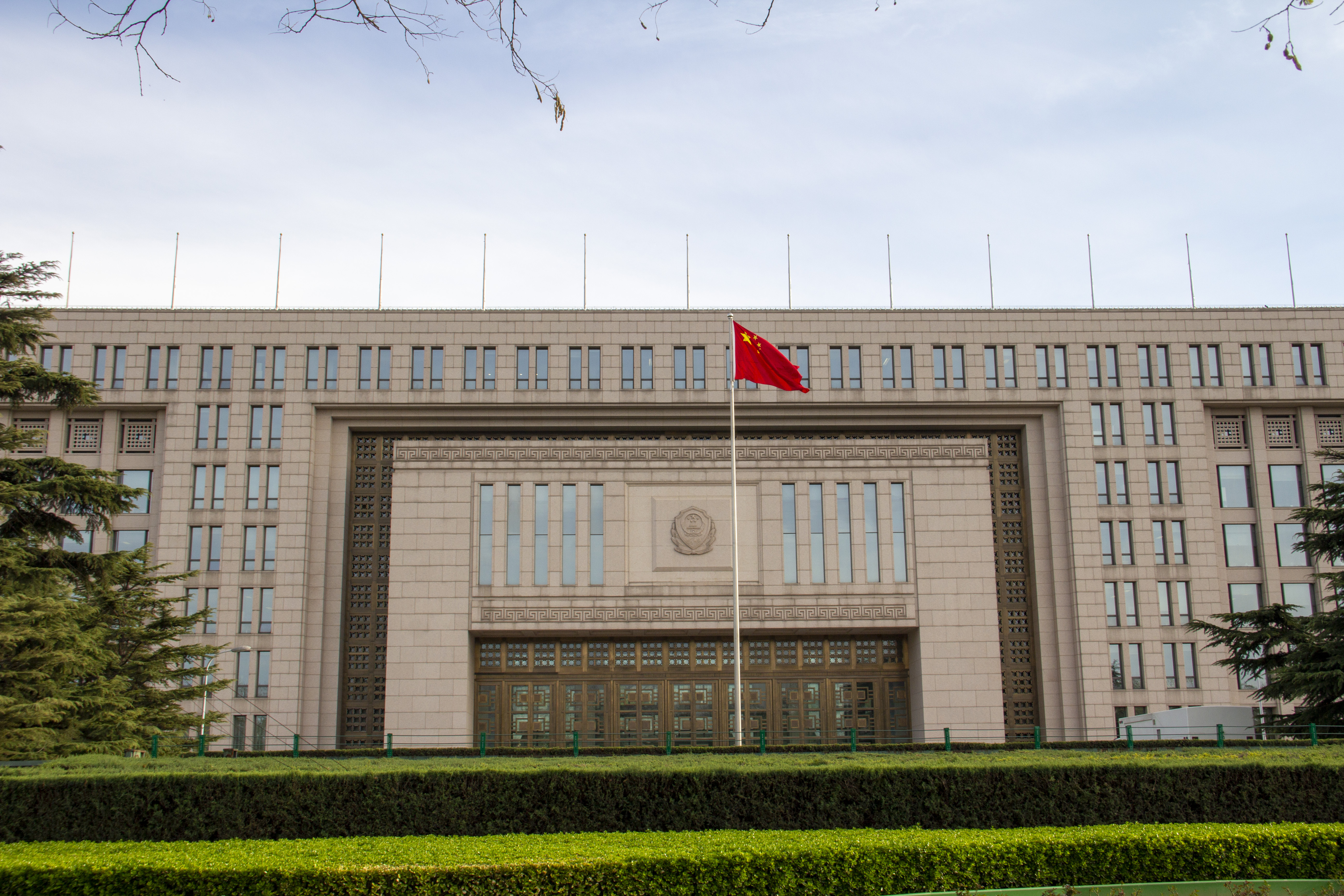
Headquarters of the MPS

The Ministry of Public Security (MPS; Chinese: 公安部; pinyin: Gōng'ānbù) (Note: Mandarin pronunciation: [kʊ́ŋ.án.pû]; abbreviation of Chinese: 公共安全部; pinyin: Gōnggòng Ānquán Bù; lit. 'Public Security Ministry' Mandarin pronunciation: [kʊ́ŋ.kʊ̂ŋ án.tɕʰɥɛ̌n pû]) is the primary law enforcement agency of the People's Republic of China (PRC). A constituent department of the State Council, the ministry oversees more than 1.9 million of the country's law enforcement officers and as such the vast majority of the People's Police. While the MPS is a nationwide police force, conducting counterintelligence and maintaining the political security of the Chinese Communist Party (CCP) are also core functions.

The ministry was established in 1949 after the CCP's victory in the Chinese Civil War as the successor to the Central Social Affairs Department and was known as Ministry of Public Security of the Central People's Government until 1954. Military intelligence affairs remained with the General Staff Department. Most of its counterintelligence responsibilities were taken over by the Ministry of State Security with its creation in 1983. The Ministry previously held joint command over the People's Armed Police together with the Central Military Commission; in 2018, the PAP's command was placed solely under the CMC.

The ministry's functions and responsibilities include criminal investigations, managing detention centers, counterterrorism, counternarcotics, transport security, traffic safety, anti-smuggling intelligence gathering and maintaining public security. It employs a system of public security bureaus throughout the provinces, cities, municipalities and townships of China. The special administrative regions of Hong Kong and Macau maintain separate police forces. The ministry is headed by the minister of public security. Wang Xiaohong has been the minister in charge since June 2022.

== History ==
The Ministry of Public Security was among the first government organs established in the PRC. It superseded the Ministry of Public Security of the CCP's Central Military Commission (CMC), a transitional body created in July 1949 by removing the security service remit from the CCP's Central Social Affairs Department (SAD). The MPS of the Central People's Government began operations on November 1, 1949, at the end of a two-week-long National Conference of Senior Public Security Cadres. Most of its initial staff of less than 500 cadres came from the (former) regional CCP North China Department of Social Affairs. At the national level, its creation signaled the formal abolition of the SAD. The ministry moved to its present location, in the heart of the one-time foreign legation quarters in Beijing, in the spring of 1950.

The Ministry of Public Security of the People's Republic of China was formed in 1954. Grand General Luo Ruiqing of the People's Liberation Army (PLA) served as its first minister. As the ministry's organization was based on Soviet and Eastern Bloc models, it was responsible for all aspects of national security; ranging from regular police work to intelligence, counterintelligence and the suppression of anti-CCP political and social sentiments. Military intelligence affairs remained with the General Staff Department, while the CCP's International Department was active in fomenting revolutionary tendencies worldwide by funneling weapons, money and resources into various pro-CCP movements.

In May 2016, the MPS with Alibaba Group launched a child abduction alert system, using applications such Weibo and Gaode Maps.

Prior to 2018, the MPS was also in charge of Ministry of Public Security Firefighting Bureau, who was in charge of firefighting duties around China, including the MPSASF's China Fire Services and volunteer firefighters. Following the creation of the People's Armed Police in 1982, Border Defense, Guards and Firefighting personnel of the MPS were turned into PAP personnel, with these 3 agencies being known as Ministry of Public Security Active Service Forces.

In 2018, all 3 MPSASF agencies were disbanded. Guard Corps and Border Defense personnel were converted into People's Police personnel, with Border Defense Personnel being handed over to the National Immigration Administration and Guard Corps Personnel becoming part of the Ministry of Public Security Special Service Bureau. China Fire Services were turned into the National Fire and Rescue Administration under the Ministry of Emergency Management, ending the MPS's command of firefighting forces since 1949.

=== Counterintelligence ===
The MPS's Guangzhou office historically handled foreign spies such as Larry Wu-tai Chin.

With the creation of the Ministry of State Security (MSS) in July 1983, MPS lost much of its counterintelligence personnel and remit. Scholars Jichang Lulu and Filip Jirouš have argued that the establishment of the MSS "may have contributed to the illusion that the MPS is simply a law-enforcement police body, separate from intelligence agencies." According to analyst Alex Joske, "the MPS lost much of its foreign intelligence remit after the MSS's creation, but has established new units for cross-border clandestine operations since then." The MPS remains a commonly used cover by MSS officers.

Following the 1989 Tiananmen Square protests and massacre, the MPS worked to counter Operation Yellowbird.

The MPS and its officers have been active abroad in Operation Fox Hunt and Operation Sky Net. The MPS under Sun Lijun had reporters from The Wall Street Journal in Hong Kong under "full operational surveillance" for their reporting of the 1Malaysia Development Berhad (1MDB) scandal.

=== Foreign relations ===
MPS has at times been involved in security diplomacy between China and other countries. For example, between 1997 and 2020, it organized 11 bilateral police diplomacy meetings with African countries. From 2006 to 2026, the MPS has signed more than 205 policing and security cooperation agreements with as many as 74 countries, as well as Taiwan. Among these agreements, 170 are bilateral, signed with 61 countries. Under Xi Jinping's general secretaryship, the MPS has increased its training of police officers from other countries. From 2006 to 2026, it has provided police training to 138 countries.

In 2017, Europol signed a "strategic cooperation agreement" with the MPS. Starting in 2019, the MPS began replacing "domestic security" with "political security" in the names of its units. In 2020, the United States Department of Commerce added the MPS Institute of Forensic Science to the Entity List over human rights issues related to the persecution of Uyghurs in China. The institute was removed from the list in 2023 as part of an agreement during the APEC United States 2023 to combat fentanyl trafficking.

In 2022, media outlets reported that the MPS had established numerous overseas police service stations, prompting investigations by law enforcement agencies in multiple countries. In 2023, the United States Department of Justice stated that the MPS engages in covert "intelligence and national security operations far beyond China's borders," including "illicit, transnational repression schemes". It charged 34 MPS officers with using fake social media accounts to harass overseas dissidents. In 2026, French authorities announced that counterintelligence services had dismantled nine clandestine Chinese police stations operated under the direction of the MPS and used to monitor the Chinese dissidents.

==== Cyber activities ====
MPS oversees a tiered system of security requirements for information systems. Since September 2021, MPS has been tasked with overseeing and supervising the protection of critical information infrastructure in China. MPS, along with the Ministry of State Security, are required to vet the personnel of state-mandated cybersecurity teams for the country's critical internet infrastructure.

Disinformation operations on Western social media by a group known as Spamouflage or "Dragonbridge" have been linked to the MPS. In February 2024, files from I-Soon, an MPS contractor used for hacking, were leaked publicly. In the run-up to the 2024 United States elections, Spamouflage was identified as having used fake social media accounts in an attempt to amplify divisions in US society.

== Function ==
The Ministry of Public security is the main police agency of China. It manages the vast majority of the People's Police. The ministry's functions and responsibilities include criminal investigations, managing detention centers, counterterrorism, counternarcotics, transport security, traffic safety, anti-smuggling intelligence gathering and maintaining public security. Additionally, conducting counterintelligence and maintaining the political security of the Chinese Communist Party (CCP) remain its core functions. It has the primary authority for preventing cyberattacks and it operates the Golden Shield Project.

== Organization ==
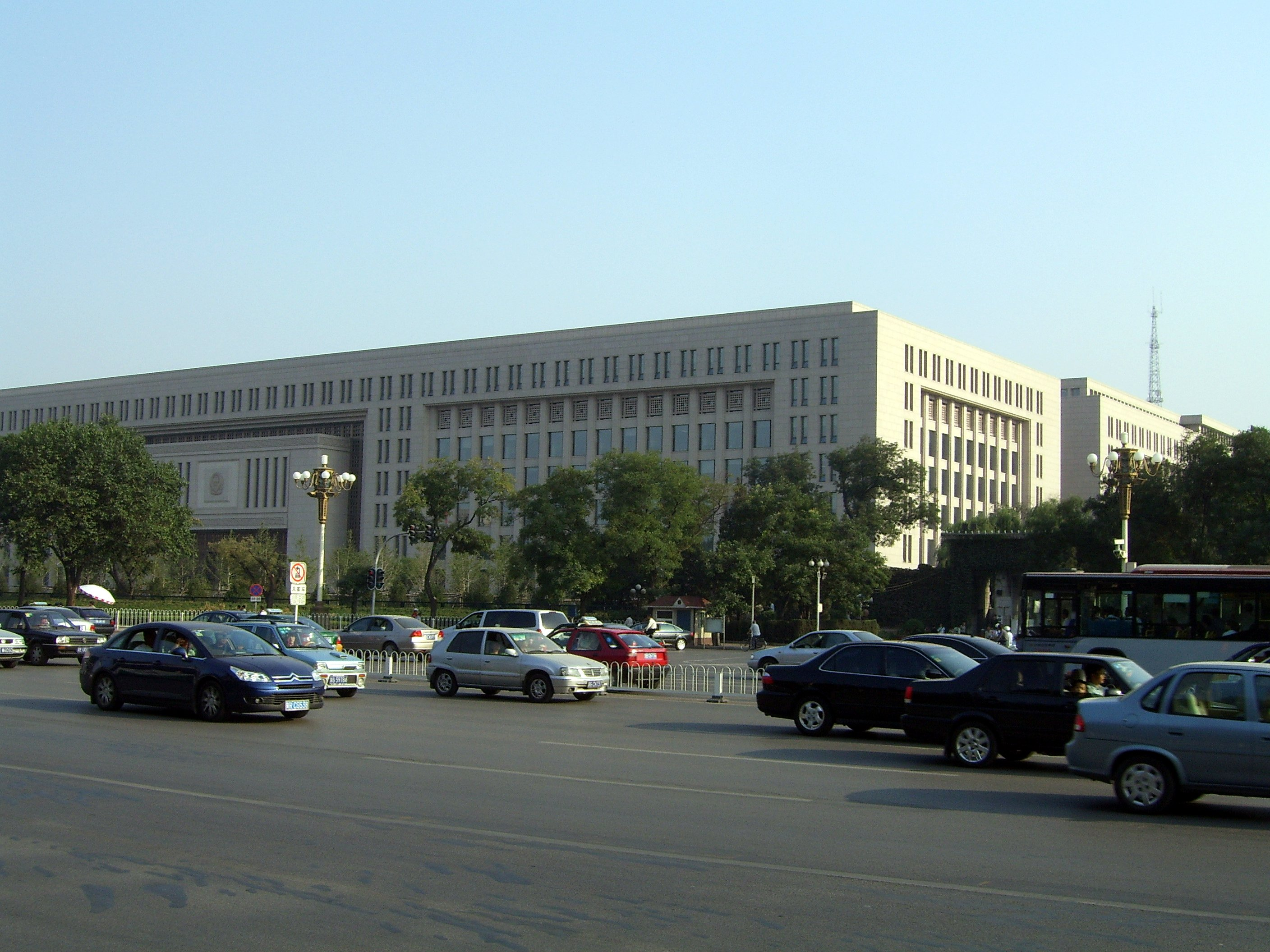
Headquarters of the Ministry of Public Security in Beijing

The ministry is headed by the minister of public security. Wang Xiaohong has been the minister in charge since June 2022. The MPS is organized into functional departments (see below). Subordinate to the MPS are the provincial- and municipal-level PSB's (Public Security Bureau) and sub-bureaus at the county and urban district levels. At the grassroots level, finally, there are police stations (Chinese: 派出所; pinyin: Pàichūsuǒ) which serve as the direct point of contact between police and ordinary citizens. While public security considerations have weighed heavily at all levels of administration since the founding of the PRC, the police are perceived by some outside observers to wield progressively greater influence at lower levels of government. Provincial public security bureaus are subject to dual supervision by both local provincial governments and the central government. The ministry is also closely associated with the development of surveillance technologies used by police in China through the Third Research Institute (Chinese: 第三研究所; pinyin: Dì-sān Yánjiūsuǒ; lit. 'No. 3 Research Institute') focused on the development of AI based "smart surveillance," and censorship technologies.

On March 5, 1989, the MPS issued the "Notice on Issuing the 'Three Rules' Program of the Ministry of Public Security." In order to facilitate the work, the bureaus and departments of the MPS were re-numbered into the first, second, third bureau model. These serial numbers are only used for the public security functional organs. Offices, services, research centers, political departments, etc. do not use serial numbers.

According to the July 2019 "Provisions on the Functions, Internal Structure, and Staffing of the Ministry of Public Security" (Chinese: 公安部职能配置、内设机构和人员编制规定), the MPS is organized into the following institutions:

=== Internal departments ===
- General Office
- Intelligence Command Center
- Research Office
- Inspection and Audit Bureau
- Personnel Training Bureau
- Information and Publicity Bureau
- Bureau of Legal Affairs（sub-ministerial level）
- Inspection Work Leading Group
- Party committees
- Disciplinary Inspection Committee of Subordinate Organs
- Retired Cadres Bureau

=== Functional bureaus ===
- Political Security Protection Bureau (1st Bureau)
- Economic Crimes Investigation Bureau (2nd Bureau)
- Public Order Bureau (3rd Bureau)
- Prevention and Processing of Cult Crimes Bureau (4th Bureau)
- Criminal Investigation Bureau (5th Bureau)
- Anti-terrorism Bureau (6th Bureau)
- Food and Drug Crimes Investigation Bureau (7th Bureau)
- Special Service Bureau (8th Bureau)
- Central Guard Bureau (9th Bureau)
- Railway Public Security Bureau (10th Bureau)
- Online Safety Bureau (11th Bureau)
- Technical Investigations Bureau (12th Bureau)
- Prison Administration Bureau (13th Bureau)
- General Administration of Customs Anti-Smuggling Bureau (14th Bureau)
- China Air Marshal Command (Officially Civil Aviation Administration Public Security Bureau) (15th Bureau)
- Logistics Bureau (16th Bureau)
- Traffic Management Bureau (17th Bureau)
- Legal Affairs Bureau (18th Bureau)
- International Cooperation Bureau (19th Bureau)
- Equipment and Finances Bureau (20th Bureau)
- Drug Control Bureau (21st Bureau)
- Technology and Information Bureau (22nd Bureau)

In line with the extensive use of one institution with two names in Chinese bureaucracy, the Economic Crime Investigation Bureau is co-located with the Securities Crime Investigation Bureau. The International Arrests Bureau is located in the International Cooperation Bureau, and is under the unified leadership of the Central Anti-Corruption Coordination Group. The daily work of the Political Department of the Ministry of Public Security is carried out by the Inspectorate Audit Bureau, the Personnel Training Bureau, and the Press and Publicity Bureau.

=== Functional organs ===
- Yangtze River Shipping PSB (deputy department level)

=== External agencies ===
- Embassies' and General Consulates' Police Affairs Liaison Organs
- Liaison Office in Hong Kong
- Liaison Office in Macao
- China-Solomon Islands Police Advisory Group

=== Subordinate units ===
- Network Technology Research Center
- Drugs Intelligence Technology Center
- Information and Communication Center
- Institute of Forensic Science
- Intelligence Center
- Resident Identity Card Key Management Center
- First Research Institute
- Third Research Institute
- Science, Technology and Information Research Institute
- China Crime Information Center
- Household Management Research Center
- Internet Crime Information Center
- People's Police Daily
- Qunzhong Publishing House
- Jindun Film and Television Cultural Center
- Woodpecker Magazine
- Traffic Management Research Center
- Procurement Center for Police Equipment
- Police Equipment and Materiel Reserve Center
- Kunming Police Dog Base
- Nanchang Police Dog Base
- Nanjing Police Dog Research Institute
- Police Dog Technical School
- Beidaihe Guesthouse
- National Anti-fraud Center
- News Media Center
- Big Data Center
- Special Duties Preparedness Center
- Examinations Center

=== Higher academic institutions ===
- People's Public Security University of China
- China People's Police University
- Criminal Investigation Police University of China
- Zhengzhou Police University
- Nanjing Police University

=== Business units ===
- China Security Anti Counterfeiting Certificate Development Center
- China Jing'an Trade Company

=== Social groups ===
- China Police Heroes and Martyrs Foundation
- China Police Sports Association

=== Regional bodies ===
Each provincial-level unit has a Public Security Department (公安厅), or for direct-rule Municipalities a Public Security Bureau with provincial department rank, whose head is appointed by the local People's Government and approved by the MPS.

- Beijing PSB
- Tianjin PSB
- Hebei PSD
- Shanxi PSD
- Inner Mongolia PSD
- Liaoning PSD
- Jilin PSD
- Heilongjiang PSD
- Shanghai PSB
- Jiangsu PSD
- Zhejiang PSD
- Anhui PSD
- Fujian PSD
- Jiangxi PSD
- Shandong PSD
- Henan PSD
- Hubei PSD
- Hunan PSD
- Guangdong PSD
- Guangxi PSD
- Hainan PSD
- Chongqing PSB
- Sichuan PSD
- Guizhou PSD
- Yunnan PSD
- Tibet PSD
- Shaanxi PSD
- Gansu PSD
- Qinghai PSD
- Ningxia PSD
- Xinjiang PSD
- Xinjiang Production Corps PSB

=== Internal publications ===
The journal Public Security Construction (Chinese: 公安建设; pinyin: Gōng'ān jiànshè) was a classified serial publication for internal purposes. During the disastrous Great Leap Forward between 1958 and 1961, the circular Public Security Work Bulletin (Chinese: 公安工作简报; pinyin: Gōng'ān gōngzuò jiǎnbào) was a top-secret serial which often described China's serious food shortages, social unrest and famine directly contradicting Mao Zedong's claims of "bountiful economic fruit".

MPS also produces another journal, People's Public Security News (Chinese: 人民公安报; pinyin: Rénmín gōng'ān Bào), and a website, China Police Daily (Chinese: 中国警察网; pinyin: Zhōngguó Jǐngchá Wǎng), for both internal communication and external publicity.

=== United front organization ===
The MPS' First Bureau operates a united front organization called the China Association for Friendship.

=== Ministry of Public Security Active Service Forces ===
Ministry of Public Security Active Services Forces (MPSASF; Chinese: 公安现役部队) was a term referring to three separate agencies under the command of the Ministry of Public Security however were composed of People's Armed Police personnel. Its name comes from the fact that since the personnel were considered PAP personnel, they were treated as active service military personnel. After the Deepening the reform of the Party and state institutions in 2018, Border Defense Corps and Guard Corps personnel became People's Police personnel, while the China Fire Services were merged with the People's Armed Police Forestry Corps and became the China Fire and Rescue, making the use of the term defunct.

== See also ==
- People's Police (China)
  - Ministry of State Security (China)
  - Public security bureau (China)
- Public Security Police Force of Macau
- Hong Kong Police Force
