= Taiwan.cn =

Chinese Communist Party website

- Native name: 中国台湾网
- Website type: News
- Available in: Chinese (Simplified and Traditional)
- Founded: July 1999; 27 years ago
- Owner: Taiwan Affairs Office
- Parent: Beijing Straits Cultural Exchange Co., Ltd.
- Website: www.taiwan.cn
- Registration: Optional
- Current status: Active

Taiwan.cn
- Simplified Chinese: 中国台湾网
- Traditional Chinese: 中國臺灣網
Transcriptions
Standard Mandarin
- Hanyu Pinyin: Zhōngguó Táiwān Wǎng

Taiwan.cn, also known as China Taiwan Network, is a news website managed by the Taiwan Affairs Office of the Central Committee of the Chinese Communist Party.

== History ==
Taiwan.cn was founded in July 1999.

== Content ==
Taiwan.cn is managed by the Taiwan Affairs Office of the Central Committee of the Chinese Communist Party.

A 2011 study showed that the news on Taiwan.cn about mainland China was mainly about science, education, culture, economy, society and medicine, while news about politics and cross-strait relations was relatively rare. The sources of news cited were mainly central-level news websites such as Xinhuanet. The news was mainly about cities, and there were more positive news.

According to a report by Taiwan's Apple Daily on May 16, 2019, this news website is a common source of disseminating controversial information and has been included in the monitoring list of the National Security Bureau. In June 2019, Taiwan.cn said that the Liberty Times reported 38 articles about the Guangdong–Hong Kong–Macao Greater Bay Area in May. The Liberty Times later refuted its claim and pointed said they only reported 21 articles, most of which were reminders of the "one country, two systems" propaganda in the Greater Bay Area.

== See also ==
- United front in Taiwan
- Chinese unification
