= Central Investigation Department =

Former Chinese intelligence service

Investigation Department
- 中国共产党中央委员会调查部
- Emblem of the Chinese Communist Party (pre-1996)

Agency overview
- Formed: 20 June 1955
- Preceding agency: Central Social Affairs Department
- Dissolved: 1 May 1983
- Superseding agency: Ministry of State Security
- Type: Central Committee constituent department
- Jurisdiction: China

The Investigation Department, also termed the Central Investigation Department, was the intelligence and counter-intelligence agency of the Central Committee of the Chinese Communist Party (CCP) from 1949 to 1983.

In 1983, the Investigation Department and other relevant agencies were merged to form the Ministry of State Security (MSS) as its successor.

== History ==
In an effort to disaffiliate the intelligence service from Kang Sheng's paranoia-driven legacy of purges, the organization was renamed to the CCP Central Committee's Investigation Department with only one Society Department branch moved out to its own organization, the Legal and Administrative Work Department.

In the 1950s, nearly every Chinese embassy abroad had an Investigation and Research Office, a cover for a group of intelligence officers belonging to the Investigation Department who kept close watch on diplomats and embassy staff, often sitting in on meetings and reporting back to CID headquarters' Eight Bureau (known later as the "Institute of Contemporary International Relations").

On 9 February 1962, Li Kenong died after a period of illness from the residual effects of brain damage from a fall he had sustained three years prior. Kong Yuan, Kang Sheng's former secretary and friend of Zhou Enlai, ran the service with Zou Dapeng and Luo Qingchang as his deputies.

Early in 1966, Mao Zedong and his defense chief Marshal Lin Biao plotted to overthrow army Chief of Staff and Deputy Prime Minister Luo Ruiqing who, despite being a lifelong supporter of the CCP and founder of the MPS, had opposed the political training in the military instituted at Mao's directive. Eager to thieve for the second time a senior position in the security services from Luo and to gain a stronghold over the party's security apparatus, Kang Sheng prepared a traitorous dossier on Luo complete with accusations of "illicit intercourse with foreigners". Lin Biao sent for Luo's arrest, and, under appalling conditions of incarceration and interrogation, Luo attempted to commit suicide in March by throwing himself from his cell breaking two legs after which Red Guards forced him to make his own self-criticism. As Mao Zedong launched his Cultural Revolution in 1966, Kang Sheng attempted to limit the destructive influence of the revolution on his intelligence and security apparatus issuing in September the directive "Codes, telegrams, confidential documents, files, and secret archives are the essential secrets of the Party and State; the safeguarding of all of these elements is the responsibility of all cadres, revolutionary masses, students, and revolutionary teachers." Despite this, Kang Sheng soon found that the calamitous red wave that overtook Mao's China would grow beyond his control. It wouldn't be until October 1978, after Mao's death in September 1976, that Hua Guofeng and Wang Dongxing would rebuild the Central Investigative Department which was officially reestablished on 28 July 1978. The organization still lacked experience or established tradecraft which would cause them a number of embarrassments.

=== Vietnamese invasion of Cambodia ===
The most impactful embarrassment of the newly reestablished Investigation Department (or Diaochabu) was their inability to predict the Vietnamese invasion of the Republic of Kampuchea (today Cambodia) in 1979. Following a visit to Democratic Kampuchea by Wang Dongxing in early November 1978, he and head of the new Central Investigative Department Luo Qinchang praised the ten-year friendship with the Khmer Rouge and helped Kaing Khek and Ta Mok to establish the neighboring communist party's notorious S-21 interrogation and extermination camp where around 20,000 Cambodians would be killed under Pol Pot's genocide. Within a month of Wang and Luo's return to China, the Socialist Republic of Vietnam launched a full-scale invasion of Kampuchea in response to a series of border attacks on the Liberation Army of Kampuchea. Perhaps by ideological closeness to Pol Pot and his followers, Chinese intelligence under the Central Investigative Department, and consequently PRC leadership, was caught by surprise by the Vietnamese invasion. Unable to contact the Khmer Rouge who, under the leadership of Ta Mok, had escaped into the jungles to organize a guerrilla resistance with only one Chinese agent carrying a defective satellite radio, a thousand Chinese military advisors fled Cambodia via Thailand and left 4,000 civilian advisors to the invading Vietnamese army. Compounding the intelligence failure, as the invasion broke the Central Investigative Department expressed confidence to Chinese leaders that the invasion would be easily repelled and that the Chinese embassy in the capital, Phnom Penh, would be unharmed.

Hoping to force a Vietnamese withdrawal from its ally Cambodia, the People's Republic of China launched their own southward invasion across the border into Vietnam in February 1979 which was withdrawn four weeks later after heavy resistance by Vietnamese guerrillas bearing Soviet and American weapons. Nonetheless, head of the CCP Deng Xiaoping supported the Khmer Rouge for another ten years in exile limiting his criticism of the two million-victim genocide assessing "the domestic counterintelligence activities created a negative atmosphere, slowing down many activities and causing social problems as well as many other problems... A thorough study of this political aspect should be undertaken and concrete measures taken."

=== End of the Diaochabu ===
At the end of the Cultural Revolution, as China struggled to regain its footing after a tumultuous decade, Deng Xiaoping and his fellow reformers Hu Yaobang and Zhao Ziyang endeavored down the road of governmental reform. CCP general secretary Hu Yaobang decried Kang Sheng's destructive and paranoid legacy in a speech in November 1978 enumerating many of the crimes Kang Sheng had been found guilty of, up to and through the Cultural Revolution. Kang's condemnation was bolstered by the investigation prepared by Luo Qingchang's Central Investigative Department which detailed how Kang had organized the Yan'an purges and named any of his opponents "counter-revolutionary".

Deng Xiaoping was himself a victim of Mao's Cultural Revolution, the Gang of Four, and Kang Sheng's secret police. Deng's son, Deng Pufang, became paraplegic and needed to use a wheelchair after Red Guards threw him from a high window. After these experiences, Deng was committed to reforming the Chinese intelligence services. Deng first initiated a small but meaningful campaign to degrade Kang Sheng's legacy, which began with Hu Yaobang's speech. Next, Deng subordinated the Central Investigative Department into a minor political organ. Finally, Deng took all the "external intelligence expertise" from the Central Investigative Department and consolidated it and all the CCP's espionage and counterintelligence functions into a new, "revolutionized" Chinese intelligence service, fitting of the new era of the Chinese "opening-up" to the world.

=== Ministry of State Security (1983–present) ===
Proposed by Premier Zhao Ziyang and Minister of Public Security Liu Fuzhi and approved at the first session of the sixth National People's Congress (NPC), the Ministry of State Security (MSS) was approved on 20 June 1983 to be a merger between the Central Investigation Department and the Bureau of Investigating Counterrevolutionaries (or the First Bureau) of the Ministry of Public Security (MPS) to "protect the security of the state and strengthen China's espionage work".
