= Hu Di =

Chinese filmmaker and Communist secret agent

- 胡底
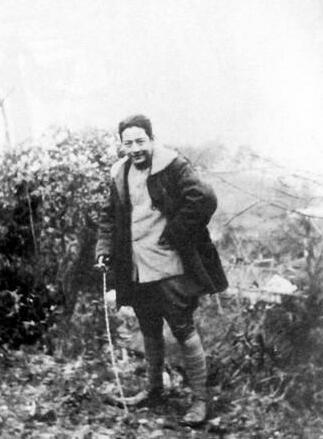
- Hu Di Circa 1930
- Born: Hu Baichang; March 10, 1905
- Died: September 1, 1935 (aged 30)
- Cause of death: Death by Execution
- Education: University of China
- Occupations: Chinese Red Army Scout, Spy, Actor and Writer
- Employer: State Political Security Department of the Chinese Communist Party
- Political party: Chinese Communist Party

Hu Di (Chinese: 胡底; 1905 – September 1935) was a Chinese filmmaker and Communist secret agent during the Republic of China era. After the Kuomintang (KMT) began the Shanghai massacre in 1927, Hu worked as a mole in the Kuomintang secret service, together with Qian Zhuangfei and Li Kenong. Chinese Premier Zhou Enlai called them "the three most distinguished intelligence workers of the Party." Hu was executed in September 1935 by renegade Chinese Communist Party commander Zhang Guotao during the Long March.

== Life and career ==
Hu was born Hu Baichang (Chinese: 胡百昌) in 1905 in Shucheng County, Anhui Province. He also used the names Hu Beifeng (Chinese: 胡北风) and Hu Ma (Chinese: 胡马).

In 1923, he was admitted to China University in Beijing, where he befriended Qian Zhuangfei and his wife Zhang Wenhua. In 1925, the three secretly joined the Chinese Communist Party (CCP), and they worked closely together. They established the Guanghua Film Company, using filmmaking as a cover for their underground activities. After the KMT's April 1927 massacre of the Communists in Shanghai, and the execution of CCP leader Li Dazhao by Fengtian clique leader Zhang Zuolin in Beijing, the three moved to Shanghai, where Hu found work at the Shanghai Film Company. He met the experienced Communist underground worker Li Kenong and introduced him to Qian.

In 1929, Qian successfully infiltrated the KMT's secret service and was appointed the chief coordinator of the central intelligence headquarters in Nanjing, in charge of recruiting more special agents. This created opportunities for Hu Di and Li Kenong to join the KMT secret service as moles. Hu was made the chief of the KMT's Tianjin secret service unit, disguised as the Great Wall News Agency, while Li ran the Shanghai unit, ostensibly the Broadcast News Service. Their intelligence reports helped the Red Army in the Jiangxi Soviet thwart the first two of Chiang Kai-shek's Encirclement Campaigns.

On 24 April 1931, Gu Shunzhang, Zhou Enlai's security chief and head of the CCPs dreaded Red Brigade, was arrested in Wuhan while on a mission to assassinate Chiang Kai-shek. To save himself, Gu defected to the KMT, and disclosed his extensive knowledge about CCP organizations. Qian Zhuangfei intercepted a telegram sent by the Wuhan police to the Nanjing headquarters, and delivered the message to Li Kenong in Shanghai, who in turned informed Zhou Enlai and telegraphed Hu Di, who immediately boarded a foreign ship and left Tianjin for Shanghai. In August 1931, Hu Di and Qian Zhuangfei left Shanghai for the Jiangxi Soviet, the CCP revolutionary base area in Jiangxi Province.

== Death and legacy ==
In 1934, the CCP was forced to evacuate the Jiangxi base area and begin the Long March. In June 1935, the Red Army arrived in Sichuan Province, where the commanders Zhu De and Zhang Guotao disagreed on the direction to continue. Zhu wanted to go north to Yan'an but Zhang ordered his soldiers to head south. Hu Di opposed Zhang's move. In retribution, Zhang labelled Hu a KMT spy and had him executed in September.

Zhou Enlai later called Qian Zhuangfei, Li Kenong, and Hu Di "the three most distinguished intelligence workers of the Party," and said that he and other CCP leaders owed their lives to them. Li, the sole survivor of the three who lived to see the founding of the People's Republic of China, was awarded the military rank of general (shang jiang) in 1955, despite having no combat experience.

== Bibliography ==
- Barnouin, Barbara; Yu, Changgen (2006). Zhou Enlai: A Political Life. Chinese University Press. ISBN 978-962-996-280-7.
- Guo, Xuezhi (2012). China's Security State: Philosophy, Evolution, and Politics. Cambridge University Press. ISBN 978-1-107-02323-9.
- Stranahan, Patricia (1998). Underground: The Shanghai Communist Party and the Politics of Survival, 1927–1937. Rowman & Littlefield. ISBN 978-0-8476-8723-7.
- Wakeman, Frederic (1995). Policing Shanghai, 1927–1937. University of California Press. ISBN 978-0-520-91865-8.
- Yu, Maochun (2013). OSS in China: Prelude to Cold War. Naval Institute Press. ISBN 978-1-61251-059-0.
