= Yang Side =

Chinese major general (1921–2018)

- 杨斯德

Personal details
- Born: 11 December 1921 Tengzhou, Shandong, China
- Died: 7 September 2018 (aged 96)
- Party: Chinese Communist Party
- Spouse: Wang Chengming (deceased) Hsia-Nan
- Children: Yang Boning, Yang Zhongwei, Yang Lili, Yang Yunfeng, Yang Dongni
- Education: Peking University

Yang Side (Chinese: 杨斯德; pinyin: Yáng Sīdé; 11 December 1921 – 7 September 2018) was a Chinese major general of the People's Liberation Army, and served as Minister of the Taiwan Affairs Office of the Central Committee of the Chinese Communist Party.

== Republican era ==
Yang Side was born on 11 December 1921 in Tengzhou, Shandong Province, to a peasant family. In 1938, he joined the Eighth Route Army as well as the Chinese Communist Party.

During the Second Sino-Japanese War, Yang held a number of positions including military chief of Shandong's Political Department and deputy minister of the Shandong Military Liaison Department.

During the Eighth Route Army's Lunan Anti-Japanese campaign, Yang was responsible for contact with the Railway Guerrillas. Using the alias Li Yiming, he infiltrated the 46th Army of the Kuomintang, taking part in battles including the Laiwu Campaign and the Huaihai Campaign as an intelligence officer from behind enemy lines.

During the battle of Nanjing in April 1949, Yang served in multiple positions including the political commissar of the Fourth Army's garrison in Nanjing.

== People's Republic of China ==
After the founding of the People's Republic of China, Yang Side was involved in the formation of the People's Liberation Army Air Force, holding the post of a division political commissar. He participated in the Korean War.

In 1955, Yang received the rank of colonel and was promoted to major general in 1964.

He served as Vice Minister of the Liaison Department of the General Political Department, Minister of the Central Taiwan Affairs Office, member of the Standing Committee of the National Committee of the Chinese People's Political Consultative Conference, executive deputy director of the Macau, Taiwan and Hong Kong Liaison Committee, among other positions.

During the "Cultural Revolution", Yang Side was persecuted and imprisoned for five years. After China's reform and opening up, Yang was rehabilitated. In May 1986, a cargo plane of Taiwan's China Airlines, flown by the captain Xijue, landed at Guangzhou Baiyun Airport. Yang Side negotiated with the Taiwanese authorities in Hong Kong.

== Personal life ==
Yang Side was married twice. In September 1949, he married the East China Field Army column art troupe captain Wang Chengming. During the Cultural Revolution, the couple were both persecuted. Yang Side published a memoir of the Cultural Revolution, entitled Historic Mission.
