= Chen Gang (intelligence officer) =

Chinese politician

Chen Gang (Chinese: 陈刚; 1907-June 7, 1967), formerly known as Liu Zhen, also known as Zuofu, was a senior leading cadre of the Chinese Communist Party (CCP) who was CCP Deputy Committee Secretary of Sichuan, secretary of the Secretariat of the Southwest Bureau, and third secretary of the Guizhou Provincial Party Committee, as well as serving as a Chinese intelligence officer and a member of the CCP's security services. He was purged in the autumn of 1966, at the start of the Cultural Revolution, and died while in custody the following year.

== Biography ==
Chen was born in Fushun County, Sichuan province. In 1925, he opposed family arranged marriages, ran away from home, and was admitted to the preparatory class of Peking University (中国大学) in Beijing, where he participated in the revolution under the influence of Li Dazhao.

He joined the Chinese Communist Party (CCP) in January 1927, serving as the branch leader and branch officer of the CCP's organization at Peking University, and the commander-in-chief of the riots in the west of Beijing. He was subsequently arrested and imprisoned, and organized and led a failed prison uprising that was supposed to allow him and other prisoners to escape.

In the summer of 1928, the Second Northern Expedition was victorious, the Feng faction warlords were defeated and retreated from the pass, and Chen Gang was rescued and released from prison. In August 1928, he went to work in the Soviet Area of Jiangxi, successively served as the party representative of the 79th column of the Jiangxi Workers and Peasants Red Army, member and secretary-general of the Jiangxi Southwest Special Committee, secretary of the Jishui County Party Committee, member of the Jiangxi Provincial Party Committee, inspector of the Jiangxi Provincial Party Committee, and inspector of the Central Committee.

In August 1930, he was sent by Zhou Enlai to serve as a member of the Central Committee for Withdrawing Funds, and went to Jiangxi, Western Fujian, and Southeast Hunan and other Soviet areas many times to withdraw funds for the Party Central Committee in Shanghai. In May 1931, the Shanghai party organization was severely damaged, and Chen Gang was transferred to the Central Transportation Bureau, responsible for international and domestic intelligence and transportation liaison. He established a central point of contact for these activities under the guise of opening a wood shop.

In 1935, he was sent by the party to Moscow to attend the 7th World Congress of the Comintern; he then stayed in Moscow to study at the International Lenin School for two years. On the eve of the outbreak of the Second Sino-Japanese War, he was sent back to China to work secretly in Shanghai, but the deterioration of the situation prevented him from carrying out that assignment.

At the end of 1937, he arrived in Yan'an via Xinjiang and was assigned to work in the security, intelligence and counterintelligence departments. Later, he was dispatched by the Central Committee of the Chinese Communist Party to carry out transportation tasks in Dihua, Xinjiang. Later, he served as the director of the second office of the Central Ministry of Social Affairs. During the Great Production Movement in Yan'an, he concurrently served as the director of the Production Committee of the central government, organized the Zaoyuan Farm, participated in farm management and field labor, organized a transportation team to solve production and supply problems, and was awarded the title of Special Model Worker in the Border Area. He participated in the 7th National Congress of the Chinese Communist Party.

Chen led a contingent of some one hundred or more SAD officers to liberated Manchuria shortly after the end of World War II and remained active in that part of China until December 1948, when he was recalled to party central and appointed deputy director of the SAD. (One source claims that he had in fact been promoted to this post already when departing Yan'an for Manchuria in November 1945.) Chen was in Beiping (Beijing) in his SAD deputy director capacity until the summer of 1949. At this time, at his own request, he was transferred to his native province of Sichuan where, during the next decade and a half, he would hold a number of senior party positions in the industrial and labour sectors in, in addition to being a concurrent member of the CCP Central Supervisory Commission.

Purged in the autumn of 1966, at the start of the Cultural Revolution, he died the following year after having been held in custody for half of a year. Chen was officially rehabilitated in May 1973.
