= Xu Enzeng =

Chinese politician

Xu Enzeng (Chinese: 徐恩曾) (1896–1985) was a Republic of China politician. He was born in Wuxing, Huzhou, Zhejiang Province. A graduate of Nanyang University, he later went to the United States to attend Carnegie-Mellon University in Pittsburgh, Pennsylvania. After returning to China, he joined the Kuomintang. In 1927, after the April 12 Incident, he became an associate of brothers Chen Guofu and Chen Lifu. He later worked alongside Dai Li at the Bureau of Investigation and Statistics. In March 1949, he left mainland China and immigrated to Taiwan, where he stayed for the rest of his life.

== See also ==
- Qian Zhuangfei
- Gu Shunzhang
