= China Crime Information Center =

Chinese central database of crimes

China Crime Information Center (国家犯罪信息中心, CCIC) is the central database for tracking crime-related information of China. The CCIC is maintained by the Ministry of Public Security of the People's Republic of China (公安部) since 1994.
