= Yuanxi, Sichuan =

Yuanxi 鸳溪镇
- Town
- Location in Sichuan
- Coordinates: 31°54′40″N 105°50′59″E
- Country: People's Republic of China
- Province: Sichuan
- Prefecture-level city: Guangyuan
- County: Cangxi County
- Time zone: UTC+8 (China Standard)

Yuanxi (Chinese: 鸳溪; pinyin: Yuānxī) is a town in Cangxi County, in Sichuan province, China. As of 2018, it has one residential community and 17 villages under its administration.
