= People's Public Security University of China =

Police college in Beijing, China

- 中国人民公安大学
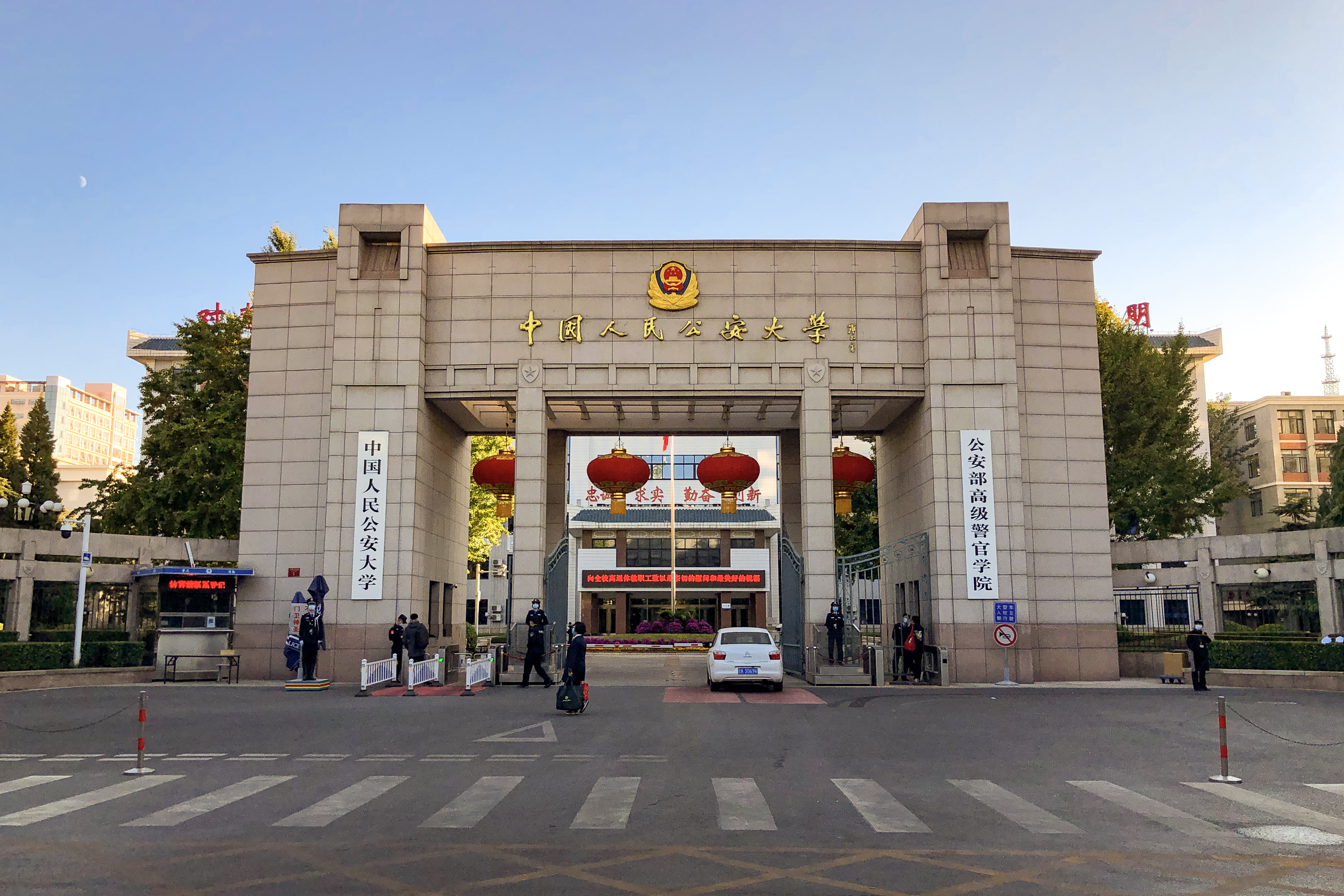
- Motto: 忠诚求实,勤奋创新
- Motto in English: Loyalty and truth, diligence and innovation
- Type: National Key University; Public Security Police University
- Established: July 1948; 78 years ago
- Affiliations: Ministry of Public Security
- President: General Cao Shiquan (2015.7-)
- Faculty: 1,000 faculty members
- Students: 12,000
- Undergraduates: 11,000
- Postgraduates: 1,000
- Location: Beijing, China
- Campus: 300 acres
- Website: www.ppsuc.edu.cn

People's Public Security University of China
- Simplified Chinese: 中国人民公安大学
- Traditional Chinese: 中國人民公安大學
- Hanyu Pinyin: Zhōngguó Rénmín Gōng'ān Dàxué
Transcriptions
Standard Mandarin
- Hanyu Pinyin: Zhōngguó Rénmín Gōng'ān Dàxué

The People's Public Security University of China (PPSUC; 中国人民公安大学) is a national police academy and public university in Xicheng, Beijing, China. Founded in 1948, it is affiliated with the Ministry of Public Security of China. The university is part of the Double First-Class Construction.

The university shares office space with the Senior Police College of the Ministry of Public Security (公安部高级警官学院). The university has been ranked as the best police academy in China since its merger with the People's Police Officers University of China (中国人民警官大学) in 1998.

== Departments ==
PPSUC has a law school, a department of foreign languages, literature, criminal investigation, criminology, management, information security, traffic control, forensic science, etc.

== Graduate destinations ==
Its graduates are employed in public security organs, state security organs and other judicial organs at all levels. Many Chinese peacekeeping police officers with field work experience come from this university, especially the Foreign Languages Department.

== Campuses ==
PPSUC now has two campuses, one at Muxidi (Xicheng, Beijing) and the other at Tuanhe (Daxing, Beijing).

== See also ==
- Ministry of Public Security (China) (中华人民共和国公安部)

- Criminal Investigation Police University of China (中国刑事警察学院)
- China People's Police University (中国人民警察大学)
