= Yuanxi Subdistrict =

Yuanxi Subdistrict 源西街道
- Subdistrict
- Location in Guangdong
- Coordinates: 23°44′9″N 114°41′40″E
- Country: People's Republic of China
- Province: Guangdong
- Prefecture-level city: Heyuan
- District: Yuancheng District
- Time zone: UTC+8 (China Standard)

Yuanxi Subdistrict (Chinese: 源西街道; pinyin: Yuánxī Jiēdào) is a subdistrict in Yuancheng District, Heyuan, Guangdong province, China. As of 2018, it has 11 residential communities and 4 villages under its administration.

== See also ==
- List of township-level divisions of Guangdong
