= Criminal Investigation Police University of China =

Police college in Shenyang, Liaoning, China

- 中国刑事警察学院
- Motto: 忠诚、求是、团结、奋进
- Motto in English: Loyalty, Truth-seeking, Unity, Ahead-forging
- Type: National; Public; Police academy
- Established: 1948
- Parent institution: Ministry of Public Security
- Location: Shenyang, Liaoning, China
- Website: www.cipuc.edu.cn

The Criminal Investigation Police University of China (CIPUC; 中国刑事警察学院) is a national public university and police academy located in Shenyang, Liaoning, China. Originally founded in 1948, it is affiliated with and funded by the Ministry of Public Security of China. The university offers undergraduate, graduate, and professional training programs, with a specialized emphasis on criminal investigation science and technology research and training for Chinese police forces nationwide.

The academy is a training base for technical reconnaissance cadres of the Ministry of Public Security, a training base for anti-narcotics police of the Ministry of Public Security, and a "criminal investigation backbone training base for the security departments of the entire military" designated by the Political Work Department of the Central Military Commission. It is known as "the highest educational institution for Chinese criminal police."

The school's predecessor was the Northeast Public Security Training Team, which was founded in May 1948. It has gone through development stages as the Northeast Public Security Cadre School, the Central People's Police Cadre School, the First People's Police Cadre School of the Ministry of Public Security, and the People's Police Cadre School of the Ministry of Public Security. In November 1981, with the approval of the State Council, the academy was expanded into the China Criminal Police Academy, becoming the first public security college in China to provide undergraduate education in public security majors. The academy obtained the right to confer master's degree in 1998.
