= Li Kenong =

Chinese general (1899–1962)

- 李克农
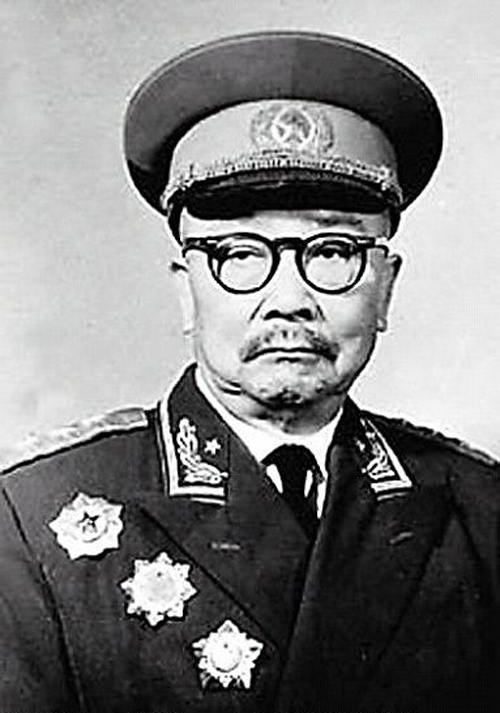
- Born: September 15, 1899; Wuhu, Anhui, Qing dynasty
- Died: February 9, 1962 (aged 62); Beijing, China
- Military career
- Allegiance: People's Republic of China
- Service years: 1926–1962
- Rank: General
- Commands: Director of Central Investigation Department (CID)
- Conflicts: Northern Expedition (1926–1928); Chinese Civil War (1946–1950); Korean War (1950–1953)
- Awards: Order of Liberation; Order of Independence and Freedom; Order of the Army

Li Kenong (Chinese: 李克农; 1899–1962) was a Chinese general and politician, one of the creators of the security and intelligence apparatus of both the Chinese Communist Party (CCP) and the People's Liberation Army. Notably, he served as Director of the Central Investigation Department, Deputy Chief of the PLA General Staff Department and Deputy Minister of Foreign Affairs and was awarded the rank of General in 1955.

== Early life ==
Born in Wuhu, Anhui, in 1899 during the Qing dynasty, Li was also known by seven names, such as Li Zetian and Li Manzi, Li Jiaxuan, Li Xiagong, etc. He became the deputy editor of the Anqing Guomin Shibao (National People's Daily) in 1926, entering the CCP in 1927. In this same period Li became a local propaganda leader for the Chinese Nationalist Party (KMT) in the same locality, and performed local coordination for the Northern Expedition. After the CCP's break with the KMT in April 1927, Li travelled to Shanghai in 1928 to do newspaper work for the communists on the Tieshenche Bao and the Laobaixing Bao newspapers.

== Secret agent under Zhou Enlai ==
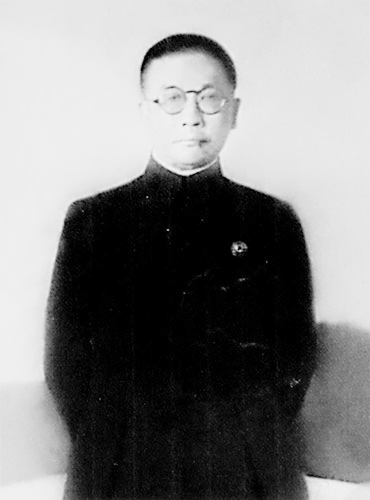
Li in Shanghai

Li was an early agent of Zhou Enlai, via the Communist intelligence agency, "Teke". Along with fellow agents Qian Zhuangfei and Hu Di, Zhou often referred to Li as one of "the three most distinguished intelligence workers of the Party". Under Zhou's direction Li joined the KMT secret police as a mole by the end of 1929. Li was soon placed in charge of investigating Communist activities, and was provided with carefully selected information about the activities of parties hostile to the KMT. The information provided to Li was carefully controlled by Zhou Enlai. Li also reported to Zhou on the plans of Chiang Kai-shek.

Beginning in 1929, under the direct order of Zhou Enlai, Li Kenong used a fake name, Li Zetian, when working inside the KMT in Shanghai. Li's work inside the KMT specialized in radio communications and cryptography. Li excelled in his work and was promoted to the section head at Shanghai. Throughout his career as a Communist mole Li took pains to pass all information of interest to the Communists.

In late April 1931, Gu Shunzhang, Zhou's chief aide in security affairs, was arrested in Wuhan. After his capture, Gu was subjected to heavy torture. Gu had strong connections with the Shanghai mafia and had shallow communist convictions. In order to save himself, Gu informed the KMT about covert CCP organizations in Wuhan, leading police to arrest and execute more than ten leading Communist leaders in the city. Gu then informed his captors that he would only inform the KMT about CCP activities in Shanghai if he could give the information directly to Chiang Kai-shek. The two-day transfer of Gu to Shanghai gave CCP intelligence two days to rescue most of their agents.

On April 25, 1931, Qian Zhuangfei, another one of Zhou's agents planted in the Nationalist intelligence agency headquartered at Nanjing, who was directly under Li's control, saw the message from Wuhan announcing Gu's capture. Qian held the message from distribution while he sent his son-in-law from Nanjing to notify Li in Shanghai. Li immediately attempted to inform CCP leaders of Gu's capture, but was not able to contact the officer in charge of CCP intelligence, Chen Geng. Li decided to break protocol instructing agents not to contact their liaisons outside of established times. Li went to look for Chen in numerous places and eventually found him, reporting the capture of Gu.

Li and Chen informed Zhou Enlai, who arranged an emergency evacuation of as many CCP members as possible from their hiding places in Shanghai. Hundreds of Zhou's agents were thus saved, but not all. Li's open attempts to contact Gu and Zhou destroyed his "cover", and marked the end of Li Kenong's ability to serve as a clandestine member of the KMT secret police. Following his work in Shanghai, Li fled to Mao Zedong's base in Jiangxi.

Li was later appointed the head of the CCP's Jiangxi Protection Branch (Zhengzhi Baowei Fenju), executive director (Zhixing Buzhang) of Political Protection for the Chinese Soviet, and Chief of the Red Army Political Protection Bureau. Upon arrival in Shaanxi at the end of the Long March, Li became the chief of the International Liaison Department of the Chinese Communist Party. In 1936, after the Xi'an Incident, he was appointed as Secretary in charge of the CCP delegation based there. During the Xi'an Incident, Li served for the first time as a principal negotiator, roles that he would repeat later on in Panmunjom (1952–3) and Geneva (1954).

== Second Sino-Japanese War ==
Upon the outbreak of the Second Sino-Japanese War in 1937, Li was appointed head of the Eighth Route Army offices in Shanghai, Nanjing, and Guilin. As Director of the Shanghai Office, he held the rank of Major General. He also became the CCP Central Committee Yangtze Bureau Secretary, and an assistant to Zhou Enlai. After the relationship between the CCP and KMT worsened following the 1941 New Fourth Army Incident, Communist delegations in Nationalist controlled regions were ordered to return to Yan'an. Li Kenong faced the difficult task of taking all of the important documents and intelligence gathered back to a Communist base without the documents being confiscated by the Kuomintang secret police. Li accomplished this successfully by letting his team ride with a KMT military convoy along the way. Li personally rode in the very same car used by the Nationalist army commander, and completed the journey without any losses. After his successful return to Yan'an, Li became the deputy director of the CCP Central Department of Social Affairs, under Kang Sheng. In 1942 he became the deputy director of the CCP Central Intelligence Department, the staff and leadership of which partially overlapped with those of the SAD. One of the primary tasks of Li and his fellow intelligence officers was to do business with local warlords, so that the supplies needed in Communist rear areas, especially medicine, could be obtained.

== Chinese Civil War ==
In 1945, Li was placed in charge of the CCP delegation office in Beiping (later known as Beijing), and was concurrently appointed head of the Central Military Commission Intelligence Department and deputy director of the SAD, under Kang Sheng. In 1947 Li became a member of the Central Committee's Rear Area Commission.

During the Chinese Civil War, Li Kenong continued to personally take charge of decoding intelligence. Agents under Li's direction achieved great success with planting moles inside the numerous KMT forces and agencies. Because of Li's work, KMT messages were deciphered and read by Communist commanders, sometimes before being sent to KMT army commanders on the battlefield.

On August 9, 1949, the SAD was formally abolished: after the establishment of the PRC on October 1, 1949, the SAD's internal security and domestic counter-intelligence work was assigned to the Ministry of Public Security, headed by General Luo Ruiqing. Li Kenong continued to serve as head of a reconstituted political and military intelligence apparatus, following instructions from Mao indicating that "Li Kenong will look after Li Kenong's business." Li became Secretary of the Central Committee's Intelligence Commission, a Deputy Foreign Minister, and Director of the General Intelligence Department.

== After 1949 ==
After the establishment of the People's Republic of China, Li was appointed Director of the Liaison Department attached to the General Intelligence Department of the Central Military Commission, thus overseeing foreign intelligence. In July 1951, Li represented the People's Republic of China at the Panmunjom Peace Talks in Korea as the leader of the joint PRC-North Korean delegation. In 1953 Li was appointed as a Deputy Chief of Staff in the People's Liberation Army. In 1954 Li became a member of the Chinese government's delegation to the Geneva Talks.

In 1955 Li was made Colonel-General in the PLA and Director of the CCP Central Investigation Department, which consolidated all Chinese foreign intelligence efforts into one central department. In recognition of his long service, in 1956 Li was elected to full membership of the CCP Central Committee.

== Death ==
Li suffered a debilitating stroke in October 1959. After his stroke, Li was not seen in public again, except for once in 1960. Li Kenong died on February 9, 1962.
