= Central Social Affairs Department =

Former Chinese intelligence service

Society Department
- 中国共产党中央委员会社会部
- Emblem of the Chinese Communist Party (pre-1996)

Agency overview
- Formed: February 18, 1939
- Dissolved: 1949
- Superseding agencies: Central Investigation Department (1955-1983); Ministry of State Security (1983-Present)
- Type: Central Committee constituent department
- Jurisdiction: China
- Agency executives: Kang Sheng, Director; Kong Yuan, Deputy Director; Pan Hannian, Deputy Director; Li Kenong, Deputy Director; Chen Gang, Deputy Director; Tang Zheng, Deputy Director; Liu Shaowen, Deputy Director

The Society Department, also termed the Central Social Affairs Department, was the intelligence and counter-intelligence agency of the Chinese Communist Party Central Committee from 1939 to 1949, prior to the establishment of the People's Republic of China.

Its successors include the intelligence departments of the Ministry of Public Security and of the People's Liberation Army. The Central Investigation Department was formed in 1955 to integrate civilian intelligence services of China. In 1983, the Investigation Department and other relevant agencies were merged to form the Ministry of State Security (MSS) as its successor.

== History ==
The creation of the Society Department followed a decision taken by the Secretariat of the Chinese Communist Party on 18 February 1939. The decision assigned to the department some five major tasks, including those of overseeing CCP counter-intelligence work and intelligence. An alternative designation of the department at this early stage was the "Central Commission for Enemy Area Operations."

The first director of the Society Department was Kang Sheng. By the time the Chinese Civil War flared up again after World War II, Kang had been replaced by his senior deputy Li Kenong as acting director. Li was officially department director in August 1949, when the Society Department was dissolved and its tasks parceled out to other agencies. After the founding of the PRC, domestic counter-intelligence work was at the central level managed by the Ministry of Public Security of the People's Republic of China, while the task of collecting political and military intelligence overseas was assigned to the Intelligence Department of the Central Military Commission. In 1955, the task of political intelligence work was transferred to a newly created Communist party body, the CCP Central Investigation Department (CID) with Li Kenong as its first director. Today, China's Ministry of Public Security and Ministry of State Security of the People's Republic of China (which succeeded the CID in 1983) both trace their institutional origins to the SAD.

Worth noting in an institutional history context is the fact that some of the Society Department's sub-national counterparts (e.g., the Department of Social Affairs of the CCP Committee of province X) continued to exist as party bodies for quite some time after the founding of the PRC. In the Tibet Autonomous Region, the Department of Social Affairs of the regional CCP Committee (orig. Work Committee) was not abolished until 2 May 1961.

== Leadership ==
Directors: Kang Sheng (October 1939 – 1948?), Li Kenong (acting dir. May 1948-?; - May 1951?)

Deputy directors: Kong Yuan (October 1939-), Pan Hannian (October 1939-), Li Kenong (March 1941-), Chen Gang (November 1945-August 1949), Tan Zhengwen (June 1948-November 1949), Liu Shaowen (May 1948-)
