= Cangxi County =

Cangxi County 苍溪县
- County
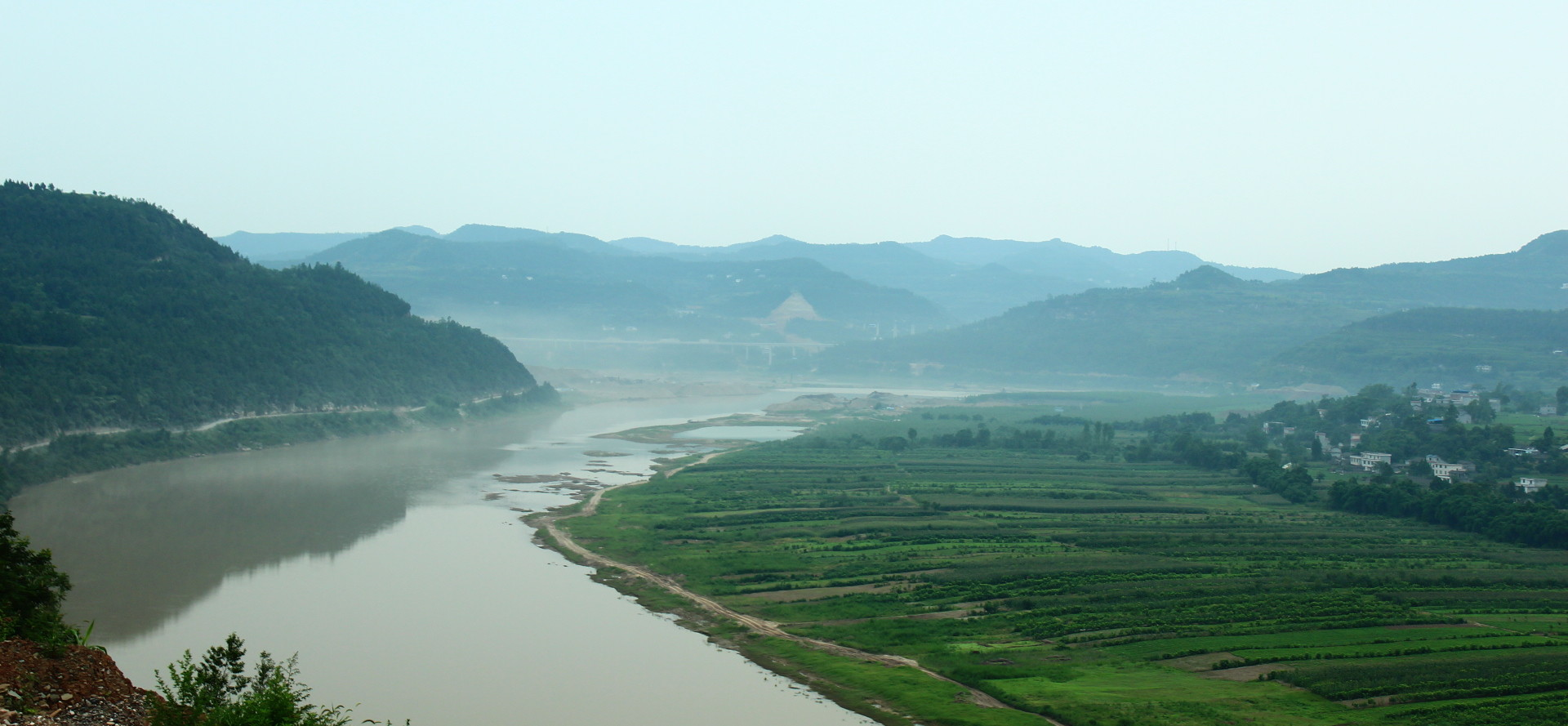
- Jialing River scenery

- Location in Sichuan
- Coordinates: 31°55′13″N 106°02′35″E
- Country: China
- Province: Sichuan
- Prefecture-level city: Guangyuan
- Township-level divisions: 25 towns 6 townships
- County seat: Lingjiang (陵江镇)

Area
  - County: 2,334 km^{2} (901 sq mi)
- Elevation: 390 m (1,280 ft)

Population (2020 census)
  - County: 512,617
  - Density: 219.6/km^{2} (568.8/sq mi)
  - Urban: 168,843
  - Rural: 343,774
- Time zone: UTC+8 (China Standard)
- Website: www.cncx.gov.cn

Cangxi County (simplified Chinese: 苍溪县; traditional Chinese: 蒼溪縣; pinyin: Cāngxī Xiàn) is a county of northeastern Sichuan Province, China, located along the upper reaches of the Jialing River. It is under the administration of Guangyuan City. The population in 2020 was 512,617.

Cangxi produces red kiwifruit, a protected geographic origin product. It also produces rice, pomelo, and several pear varieties.

== Administrative divisions ==
Cangxi administers 25 towns and 6 townships:

English	Chinese	Population (2020 census)
Lingjiang Town*	陵江镇	143446
Yunfeng Town	云峰镇	15383
Dongqing Town	东青镇	15010
Baiqiao Zhen	白桥镇	10123
Wulong Town	五龙镇	10537
Yongning Town	永宁镇	6918
Yuanxi Town	鸳溪镇	7314
Sanchuan Town	三川镇	10250
Longwangzhen	龙王镇	17677
Yuanba Town	元坝镇	35444
Huanma Zhen	唤马镇	7670
Qiping Town	歧坪镇	22064
Baiyi Town	白驿镇	14535
Lijiang Town	漓江镇	11833
Wenchang Town	文昌镇	13286
Yuedong Zhen	岳东镇	14421
Shima Zhen	石马镇	11055
Yunshan Town	运山镇	7342
Dongxi Town	东溪镇	23830
Gaopo Zhen	高坡镇	13869
Longshan Town	龙山镇	24001
Tingzi Zhen	亭子镇	5928
Baili Town	百利镇	8479
Huangmaoya Town	黄猫垭镇	8698
Hedi Town	河地镇	11620
Baihe Township	白鹤乡	7688
Zheshui Town	浙水乡	5721
Yueshan Township	月山乡	11288
Baishan Township	白山乡	6296
Pengdian Xiang	彭店乡	5498
Qiaoxi Township	桥溪乡	5393

*county seat

== Climate ==
Climate data for Cangxi, elevation 460 m (1,510 ft), (1991–2020 normals, extremes 1981–present)
Month	Jan	Feb	Mar	Apr	May	Jun	Jul	Aug	Sep	Oct	Nov	Dec	Year
Record high °C (°F)	21.0 (69.8)	23.9 (75.0)	32.0 (89.6)	34.0 (93.2)	36.4 (97.5)	37.4 (99.3)	39.8 (103.6)	41.0 (105.8)	37.8 (100.0)	31.0 (87.8)	26.8 (80.2)	20.0 (68.0)	41.0 (105.8)
Mean daily maximum °C (°F)	9.6 (49.3)	12.5 (54.5)	17.5 (63.5)	23.3 (73.9)	27.0 (80.6)	29.4 (84.9)	31.7 (89.1)	31.9 (89.4)	26.4 (79.5)	21.2 (70.2)	16.2 (61.2)	10.7 (51.3)	21.5 (70.6)
Daily mean °C (°F)	5.9 (42.6)	8.4 (47.1)	12.5 (54.5)	17.6 (63.7)	21.5 (70.7)	24.5 (76.1)	26.7 (80.1)	26.5 (79.7)	21.9 (71.4)	17.1 (62.8)	12.3 (54.1)	7.3 (45.1)	16.9 (62.3)
Mean daily minimum °C (°F)	3.2 (37.8)	5.4 (41.7)	8.8 (47.8)	13.4 (56.1)	17.3 (63.1)	20.7 (69.3)	23.1 (73.6)	22.7 (72.9)	19.0 (66.2)	14.5 (58.1)	9.6 (49.3)	4.8 (40.6)	13.5 (56.4)
Record low °C (°F)	−3.3 (26.1)	−1.2 (29.8)	−1.4 (29.5)	3.6 (38.5)	8.7 (47.7)	13.5 (56.3)	16.9 (62.4)	15.8 (60.4)	12.5 (54.5)	2.7 (36.9)	0.4 (32.7)	−4.2 (24.4)	−4.2 (24.4)
Average precipitation mm (inches)	13.3 (0.52)	14.7 (0.58)	30.5 (1.20)	59.0 (2.32)	114.3 (4.50)	150.0 (5.91)	207.2 (8.16)	156.5 (6.16)	155.9 (6.14)	67.8 (2.67)	28.1 (1.11)	10.2 (0.40)	1,007.5 (39.67)
Average precipitation days (≥ 0.1 mm)	7.2	6.9	9.6	10.5	12.3	13.2	13.4	11.3	13.5	13.3	8.1	6.2	125.5
Average snowy days	1.7	0.6	0.1	0	0	0	0	0	0	0	0.1	0.4	2.9
Average relative humidity (%)	76	74	71	71	70	77	79	77	82	82	79	78	76
Mean monthly sunshine hours	56.2	54.5	97.9	132.6	140.3	132.1	159.6	173.3	93.7	74.8	64.7	51.3	1,231
Percentage possible sunshine	17	17	26	34	33	31	37	43	26	21	21	16	27
Source: China Meteorological Administration all-time extreme temperature all-time January high
