= Gu Shunzhang =

Chinese spy and politician (1903–1934)

- 顾顺章
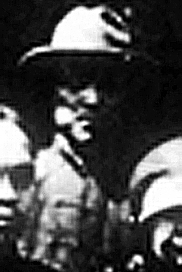
- Born: 1904; Baoshan County, Jiangsu, Qing China (now Baoshan, Shanghai)
- Died: 1935 (aged 30–31); Zhenjiang, Jiangsu, Republic of China
- Cause of death: Execution, assassination
- Citizenship: Republic of China
- Occupations: Intelligence chief, spymaster
- Employer: Central Special Branch of the Chinese Communist Party
- Political party: Chinese Communist Party (Defected)

Gu Shunzhang
- Traditional Chinese: 顧順章
- Simplified Chinese: 顾顺章
Transcriptions
Standard Mandarin
- Hanyu Pinyin: Gù Shùnzhāng
Wu
- Wugniu: Ku^{5} Zen^{6}tsaon^{1}

Gu Fengming
- Traditional Chinese: 顧鳳鳴
- Simplified Chinese: 顾凤鸣
Transcriptions
Standard Mandarin
- Hanyu Pinyin: Gù Fèngmíng
Wu
- Wugniu: Ku^{5} Von^{6}min^{6}

Gu Shunzhang (Chinese: 顾顺章; pinyin: Gù Shùnzhāng; 1903 – 1934), born Gu Fengming, was a Chinese early leader, spymaster, and defector of the Chinese Communist Party (CCP). Sent to Soviet Russia to train in espionage, Gu was chosen by Zhou Enlai to lead the CCP's first intelligence service, the Central Special Branch (Chinese: 中央特科; pinyin: Zhōngyāng Tè Kē). After he was captured by the Kuomintang (KMT), Gu defected and revealed to the KMT intelligence all he knew of Zhou Enlai's underground communist spy network earning him a reputation as "the most dangerous traitor in the history of the CCP".

Early in his life, Gu worked at Nanyang Tobacco Factory, where he became an active participant of workers' movement, then of the Shanghai Trade Union and finally of the CCP. In 1926 Gu was sent to the Soviet Union (Vladivostok) for training as a spy. After his return he participated thrice in the armed uprisings in Shanghai.

In 1927, after the 12 April Incident, he became an active member of the underground communist movement together with Zhou Enlai, held numerous posts and finally became the Head of the Chinese Politburo's security service. Known as a magician, in fact he personally participated in physical extermination of the CCP betrayers and thus became famous as a party activist.

On 24 April 1931, while giving a performance in Wuhan. Gu was identified from a photograph by the KMT special service. After the arrest he was persuaded to defect, thus causing the execution of several thousand communists over the next three months (according to the estimation of the French intelligence bureau in Shanghai). Among those shot was Xiang Zhongfa, the General Secretary of CCP.

As retribution, members of his family were killed, except his young daughter Gu Liqun (顾立群) and nephew Zhang Changgeng (张长庚), allegedly on the orders of Zhou.

In the following years Gu was an effective coach of the Nanjing intelligence service, secretly organized a "New Communist Party" in 1934. However, he was captured and executed by intelligence services under the KMT. The execution took place in Suzhou in December 1934 (June 1935).

== See also ==
- Zhang Guotao
