= Forced confession =

Confession obtained from a person under duress

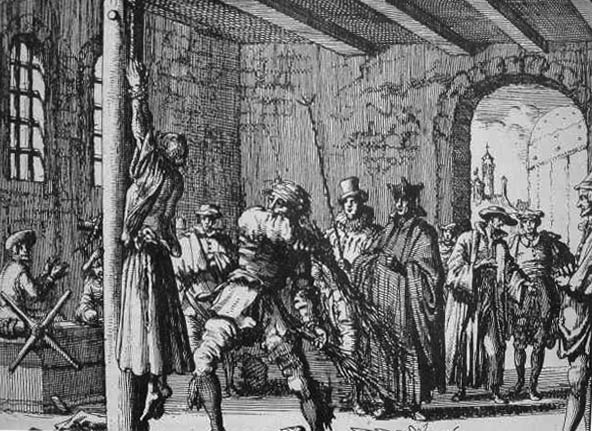
The teacher Ursula painfully tortured, whipped, beaten, and finally burned in Maastricht, AD 1570 engraved by Jan Luyken for the Martyrs Mirror, 1685

A forced confession is a confession obtained from a suspect or a prisoner by means of torture (including enhanced interrogation techniques) or other forms of coercion. Depending on the level of coercion used, a forced confession is not valid in revealing the truth. The individuals being interrogated may agree to the story presented to them or even make up falsehoods themselves in order to satisfy the interrogator and discontinue their suffering.

For centuries the Latin phrase "Confessio est regina probationum" (in English: "Confession is the queen of evidence") justified the use of forced confession in the European legal system. During the Middle Ages, acquiring a confession prior to a trial was especially important. The methods used to acquire a confession were considered less important than the actual confession itself, thus de facto sanctioning torture and forced confessions.

By the late 18th century, most scholars and lawyers thought of the forced confession not only as a relic of past times and morally wrong but also ineffective as the victim of torture may confess to anything just to ease their suffering.

Developments in the 20th century, notably the Universal Declaration of Human Rights, greatly reduced the legal acceptance of forced confessions. However, for most of legal history they have been accepted in most of the world, and are still accepted in some jurisdictions.

== Modern-day usage ==
=== Bahrain ===
==== Mohamed Ramadan ====
Bahraini authorities refused for more than two years to investigate complaints regarding the torture of Mohamed Ramadan—a father-of-three on death row who was tortured into making a false confession.

In February 2014, Ramadan was arrested from Bahrain International Airport, where he worked as a police officer. He was accused of involvement in an attack on other police officers. There is no evidence tying him to the crime, according to Reprieve, who state that Ramadan is innocent and was arrested in retaliation for his attendance at pro-democracy demonstrations.

Following his arrest, Ramadan was tortured by police into signing a false confession. During his initial detention, police officers "told Mohammed outright that they knew he was innocent", but were punishing him as a traitor for attending pro-democracy demonstrations.

During his entire pre-trial detention, Ramadan was not allowed to meet with his lawyer. The day Ramadan's trial began was the first time he saw his lawyer's face. In that trial, he was convicted and sentenced to death almost solely on the basis of confessions extracted through prolonged torture.

==== 2016 Reprieve report ====
In 2016, human rights organisation Reprieve published an investigative report which argued that seven Bahraini men facing the death penalty had been forced into confessing their crimes after being tortured during interrogations. The report also revealed that the Bahraini government was employing Northern Ireland Co-operation Overseas, a firm funded by the Foreign, Commonwealth and Development Office, to train its law enforcement personnel.

==== Sami Mushaima, Ali Al-Singace, Abbas Al-Samea (2017) executed ====
On 15 January 2017, Bahraini authorities executed three torture victims following authorization by King Hamad. Sami Mushaima (42), Ali Al-Singace (21) and Abbas Al-Samea (27) were executed by firing squad.

Bahrain security forces (a force that includes foreign national forces) arrested Sami Mushaima in March 2014 and held him incommunicado for at least 11 days. Security officials subjected Mushaima to beatings, electrocution, and sexual assault. His front teeth were severely damaged. Mushaima's family believes he was coerced into falsely confessing through the use of torture.

Sami Mushaima, Ali Al-Singace, and Abbas Al-Samea are all torture victims rendered stateless and condemned to death following unfair trials. Their executions have sparked widespread protests across the country.

Maya Foa, chief executive officer of the international human rights group Reprieve, said:

It is nothing short of an outrage – and a disgraceful breach of international law – that Bahrain has gone ahead with these executions. The death sentences handed to Ali, Sami and Abbas were based on confessions extracted through torture, and the trial an utter sham. ... It would be shameful if the UK continued to support Bahrain's security apparatus and Ministry of Interior in the face of such terrible abuses.

The European Union also condemned the sentences: "This case is a serious drawback given that Bahrain had suspended executions for ... (several) years, and concerns have been expressed about possible violations of the right to a fair process for the three convicted".

=== Brazil ===
==== Tainá Rape (2013) ====
Four men were arrested and confessed to raping and killing a girl named Tainá who was crossing in front of the theme park where they worked. Later the police found that the girl was not raped and that the four men were tortured. 13 policemen were arrested, and the police chief fled.

=== China ===
The People's Republic of China systematically employed forced televised confession against Chinese dissidents and workers of various human rights groups in an attempt to discredit, smear and suppress dissident voices and activism. These scripted confessions, obtained with the person under duress and via torture, are broadcast on the state television. Notable victims includes Wang Yu, a female human rights lawyer, and Swedish citizen Peter Dahlin, an NGO worker and human rights activist. The owners of Causeway Bay Books – Gui Minhai and Lam Wing-kee – who were abducted by state security agents operating outside of Mainland China, also made such controversial confessions. Upon regaining his freedom, Lam detailed his abduction and detention, and recanted his confessions in Hong Kong to the media.

These televised confessions and acts of contrition have been denounced as frauds by critics. Media organisations in China and in Hong Kong, including the South China Morning Post, which is owned by Alibaba, have been criticised for abetting the practice by circulating the "confessions" and in some cases even participating in them. Safeguard Defenders released a report in April 2018 in which 45 high-profile examples of the so-called confessions were broadcast between July 2013 and February 2018. More than half of the subjects were journalists, lawyers, and other individuals involved in promoting human rights in China. The confessions were mostly imposed on the subjects outside of the formal legal framework, in the absence of a trial, and without regard for the presumption of innocence under the Chinese law. Many of those forced to record confessions later explained in detail how the videos were carefully scripted and made under the watchful eyes of the agents of the security apparatus, demonstrating their powerlessness once they are within the opaque Chinese legal system.

=== Islamic Republic of Iran ===
According to various human rights groups and observers, the Islamic Republic of Iran has systematically used forced confessions against political dissidents and other prisoners. Such confessions are often prominently broadcast on national television.

Historian Ervand Abrahamian in 1999 observed that forced confessions come in a variety of forms, "pretrial testimonials; in chest-beating letters; in mea culpa memoirs; press conferences, 'debates', and 'roundtable discussions'", but most commonly in videotaped 'interviews' and 'conversations' aired on prime-time television." While the constitution of the Islamic Republic explicitly outlaws shekanjeh (torture) and the use of coerced confessions, other laws are employed to allow coercion.

In June 2020, FIDH and its member organization Justice for Iran (JFI), in a 57-page report titled "Orwellian State: The Islamic Republic of Iran's State Media as a Weapon of Mass Suppression", reported that between 2009 and 2019, Iranian state-owned media IRIB broadcast the forced confessions of about 355 individuals and defamatory content against at least 505 individuals. The report is the outcome of more than 1,500 hours of research and analysis of over 150 programs and 13 in-depth interviews with victims of forced confessions.

=== Khmer Rouge ===
In the 1970s, the Khmer Rouge used torture to force confessions and false implications from approximately 17,000 persons at the former Tuol Sleng high school. All but seven were either executed or died due to the mistreatment. The leaders of the interrogation and torture system of the Khmer Rouge were Mam Nai and Tang Sin Hean.

=== Soviet Union ===
In the Soviet Union, a series of show trials, known as the Moscow Show Trials, were orchestrated by Joseph Stalin during the Great Purge of the late 1930s. More than 40 high-level political prisoners were sentenced either to the firing squad or to labour camps. The trials are today universally acknowledged to have used forced confessions, obtained through torture and threats against the defendants' families, to eliminate any potential political challengers to Stalin's authority.

=== Spain ===
==== The Crime of Cuenca (1910) ====
Due to police torture, two men confessed to the murder of another man who had disappeared. Based solely on their confession, as no body had been recovered, they were convicted and sentenced to long jail terms. Years later the supposed victim reappeared in the small village, and it was proven that he had left voluntarily years before.

=== United Kingdom ===
==== Birmingham Six (1974) ====
The Birmingham Six were six men from Northern Ireland accused of carrying out the Birmingham pub bombings in 1974. After their arrest, four of the six confessed to the crime. These confessions were later claimed to be the result of intimidation and torture by police, including the use of dogs and mock executions. In 1991, after 17 years in prison, an appeal to their convictions was allowed. The evidence at hearing showed widespread police fabrication, suppression of evidence, and extreme irregularities in the relevant forensic evidence. All six individuals were released and awarded compensation of up to £1.2 million. As a result of this and other miscarriages of justice, a Royal Commission on Criminal Justice was established in March 1991 to create reforms and provide oversight to the process.

==== Guildford Four (1974) ====
As a result of the Guildford pub bombings carried out by Irish republican paramilitaries in 1974, three Irish men and one English woman were charged and convicted of murder and terrorist activities. All had confessed to the crimes while in police custody but later retracted their statements. In their trial, they would claim that they had made false confessions, resulting from intimidation and torture by police. Seven relatives of one of the original four defendants were also convicted of terrorist activities in 1976. All of the individuals involved had their convictions quashed, by two rulings in 1989 and 1991, after having served up to 16 years in prison. These appeals investigations revealed large-scale deception and illegal activities undertaken by both the Metropolitan Police and the Crown Prosecution Service. In 2005, the Prime Minister of the United Kingdom, Tony Blair, issued a public apology for the imprisonment of these persons, describing it as an 'injustice' and stating that "they deserve to be completely and publicly exonerated".

=== United States ===
Since 2001, as part of its war on terror, the Central Intelligence Agency operates a network of offshore prisons, called black sites. State officials have admitted to the press that prisoners of the war on terror have been tortured through this program, sometimes after forced disappearance or extraordinary rendition.

When these systematic acts were made public, the European Union, the United Nations, the international press, and various human rights movements condemned it. The Supreme Court of the United States repeatedly ruled against hearing from those that underwent forced confessions, even after they were found innocent, claiming that a trial would constitute a breach of national security.

==== Brown v. Mississippi (1936) ====
The Supreme Court ruling in Brown v. Mississippi (1936) established conclusively that confessions extracted through the use of physical brutality violate the Due Process Clause. In this case, three black tenant farmers, Arthur Ellington, Ed Brown, and Henry Shields had been convicted and sentenced to death in Mississippi for the murder of Raymond Stewart (a white planter) on 30 March 1934. The convictions had been based solely on confessions obtained through violence:

... defendants were made to strip and they were laid over chairs and their backs were cut to pieces with a leather strap with buckles on it, and they were likewise made by the said deputy definitely to understand that the whipping would be continued unless and until they confessed, and not only confessed, but confessed in every matter of detail as demanded by those present; and in this manner, the defendants confessed the crime, and, as the whippings progressed and were repeated, they changed or adjusted their confession in all particulars of detail so as to conform to the demands of their torturers. When the confessions had been obtained in the exact form and contents as desired by the mob, they left with the parting admonition and warning that, if the defendants changed their story at any time in any respect from that last stated, the perpetrators of the outrage would administer the same or equally effective treatment. Further details of the brutal treatment to which these helpless prisoners were subjected need not be pursued. It is sufficient to say that in pertinent respects the transcript reads more like pages torn from some medieval account than a record made within the confines of a modern civilization which aspires to an enlightened constitutional government.

The Supreme Court concluded: "It would be difficult to conceive of methods more revolting to the sense of justice than those taken to procure the confessions of these petitioners, and the use of the confessions thus obtained as the basis for conviction and sentence was a clear denial of due process ... In the instant case, the trial court was fully advised by the undisputed evidence of the way in which the confessions had been procured ... The court thus denied a federal right fully established and specially set up and claimed, and the judgment must be reversed."

== See also ==
- Castellania
- False confession
- Perjury
- Right to silence
- Struggle session (Maoist China)
- Forced Confessions
- Interrogational torture
