= People's Recreation Community =

Hong Kong bookshop

People's Recreation Community (Chinese: 人民公社), originally known as People's Bookstore, was a bookstore in Hong Kong's Causeway Bay district. It was one of the last bookshops in Hong Kong selling titles banned by the Chinese Communist Party, and its closure in 2018 marked a change in the city’s historic independent publishing scene.

== See also ==
- Causeway Bay Books
- Causeway Bay Books disappearances
