= Gui Minhai =

Hong Kong-Swedish writer detained by China in 2015

- Born: 5 May 1964 (age 62); Ningbo, Zhejiang, China
- Other names: Michael Gui; Ah Hai
- Education: Peking University (bachelor 1985); University of Gothenburg (MA 1990, PhD 1996)
- Occupations: Book publisher; writer
- Years active: 2006–present

Chinese name
Transcriptions
Standard Mandarin
- Hanyu Pinyin: Guì Mínhǎi
Yue: Cantonese
- Yale Romanization: gwái man hōi
- Jyutping: gwai3 man4 hoi2
- Website: freeguiminhai.com

Gui Minhai (Chinese: 桂民海; pinyin: Guì Mínhǎi; Jyutping: gwai3 man4 hoi2; born 5 May 1964), also known as Michael Gui, is a Hong Kong-Swedish book publisher and writer. He is an author of many books related to Chinese politics and Chinese political figures; Gui authored around 200 books during his ten-year career under the pen-name Ah Hai (阿海) and was one of three shareholders of Causeway Bay Books in Hong Kong.

Gui went missing in Thailand in late 2015, one of five men who vanished in a string of incidents known as the Causeway Bay Books disappearances. The case ignited fears locally and in Britain over the collapse of "one country, two systems", over the possibility that people could be subject to rendition from Hong Kong and from other countries by Chinese law enforcement. The Chinese government had been silent about holding him in custody for three months, at which point a controversial video confession was broadcast on mainland media. In it, Gui said that he had returned to mainland China and surrendered to the authorities of his own volition; he appeared to indicate that he was prepared to follow the course of justice in China, while waiving protection as a Swedish citizen. Gui's case has severely strained the relations between Sweden and China.

Many observers expressed doubts about the sincerity and credibility of Gui's confession. The Washington Post described the narrative as "messy and incoherent, blending possible fact with what seems like outright fiction". Chinese state media said in late February 2016 that Gui was being held for "illegal business operations". He is alleged to have knowingly distributed books not approved by China's press and publication authority since October 2014. Although Gui was released from detention in October 2017, he was once again abducted by suspected state security agents – a group of men in plain clothes – in January 2018 while on his way to Beijing for a medical visit. Shortly afterwards, while under detention for breaking unspecified laws, he once again confessed, denouncing Swedish politicians for instigating him to leave the country and for "using me as chess piece". Gui Minhai is still under detention in China as of December 2019, and was sentenced in February 2020 to 10 years' imprisonment for "illegally providing intelligence overseas".

Lee Bo, Gui's Hong Kong–based business partner, denied that Gui was on a "political mission against the Communist party", instead likening him as mostly a businessman where publishing books was a means of earning money rather than ideology. "In his books there is a lot of guessing also about political gossip rather than actual fact."

== Biography ==
=== Early life ===
Born in Ningbo in 1964, Gui graduated from Peking University with a bachelor's degree in history in 1985. Gui served as editor to the People's Education Press until 1988, when he departed for Sweden, and enrolled in a doctoral program at the University of Gothenburg. After the Tiananmen Square massacre, he obtained Swedish residency, and later became a naturalised citizen of Sweden, upon which he renounced his Chinese citizenship. Gui obtained his PhD in 1996. Gui's wife is also a naturalised Swedish citizen; the couple's daughter was born in 1994. Gui returned to Ningbo, China in 1999 and created a subsidiary for a Swedish company known in Chinese as Tangyou (唐友), offering air purification products. Gui was the CEO and board member.

=== Publishing career ===
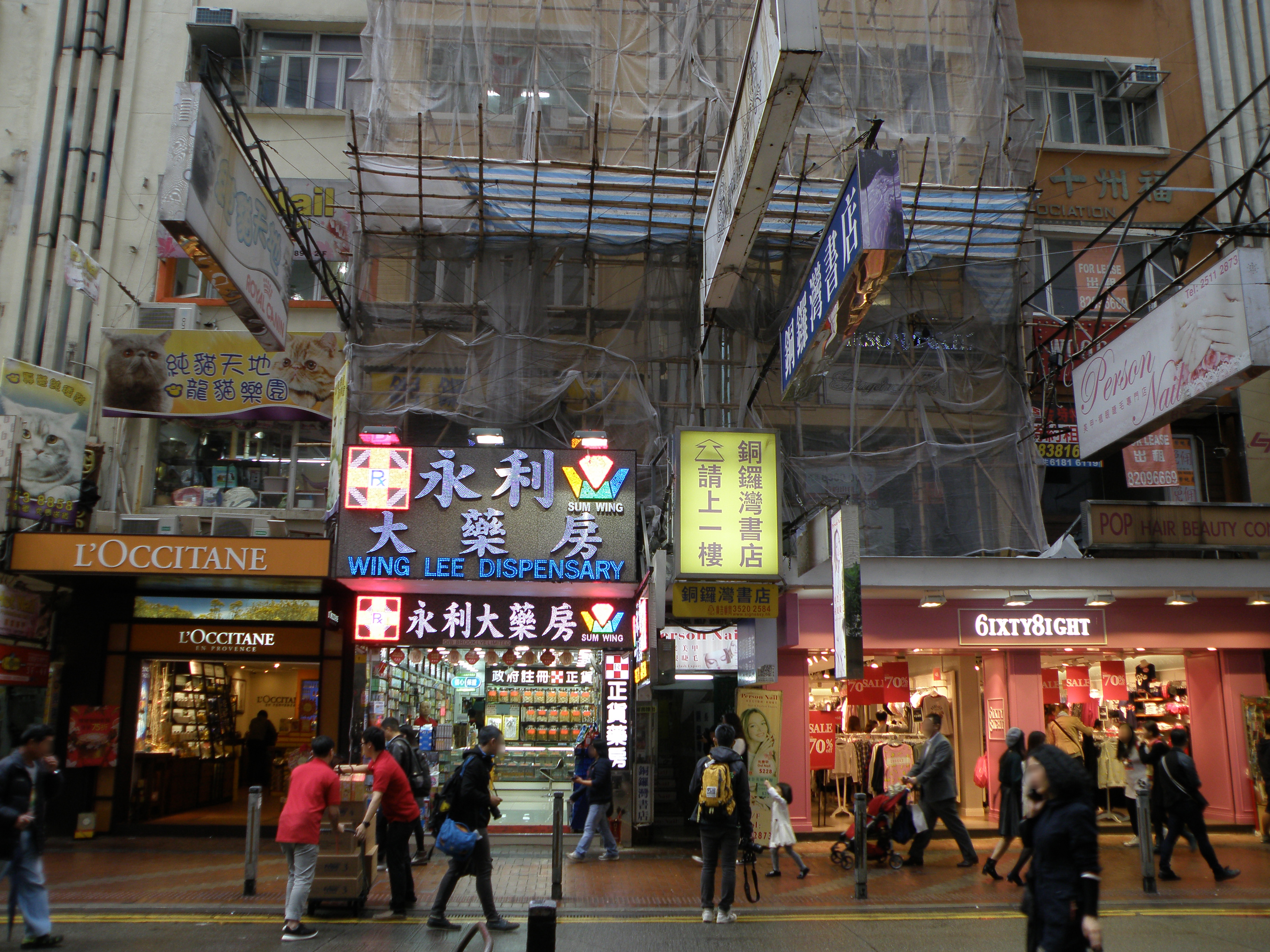
Causeway Bay Bookstore in Causeway Bay, Hong Kong; 3 January 2016

As the political climate in China grew milder, Gui moved to Hong Kong. There, beginning in 2006, he set up several publishing companies that focused on mainland Chinese politics. He joined the Chinese chapter of PEN International, through which he became acquainted with professionals in Hong Kong International PEN. In 2013, Gui, Lee Bo, and Lui Bo set up Mighty Current Media (also referred to as Sage Communications), a Hong Kong company specialising in publishing and distributing books on political gossip about leaders in China. Gui and Lee Bo both hold 34% of the company's shares (Lee Bo's shares are in the name of his wife, Sophie Choi), and Lui Bo holds the remaining 32%. In 2014, the company acquired Causeway Bay Books, an upstairs bookstore in the bustling part of Hong Kong.

Under the name "Ah Hai", Gui authored around 200 books during his ten-year career. The subjects of these books included Bo Xilai, and Zhou Yongkang, who are former members of the CCP Politburo, and CCP general secretary Xi Jinping. The books have been described in the Western media as "thinly-sourced, tabloid-style political books ... which are outlawed in mainland China". One of Gui's books, The General Secretary's Eight Love Stories, asserts that Xi Jinping has "had a number of affairs, including one with a television presenter". Lee Bo acknowledged that Gui's books contained a lot of conjecture and gossip rather than fact, and described Gui as a businessman whose publishing was motivated by profit rather than ideology.

Because works critical of the leadership of the Chinese regime are considered sensitive, Gui always kept his work projects secret; he kept his movements to himself and his telephone calls were re-routed through foreign countries. He went a long period without entering China; he did not visit his father when the latter was ill, and did not return to China for his father's funeral. Media sources reported that Gui had published about half of the popular books written on Bo Xilai. When Bo was caught in the political fallout from the Wang Lijun incident in 2013, Gui reaped a financial benefit of HK$10 million from the surge in book sales. Gui's publishing financed his property acquisitions in Hong Kong and Germany, including a seaside retreat in Pattaya, Thailand.

The International Publishers Association announced in February 2018 that Gui was the winner of the association's Publishing Freedom Award for fearless publishing in the face of adversity.

== Disappearance ==
Gui's colleagues last heard from him on 15 October 2015. Gui was captured on closed circuit TV leaving his apartment in Pattaya, Thailand on 17 October 2015, apparently taken away by an unknown man. He was the second bookseller associated with Causeway Bay Books to apparently vanish without trace: Lui Bo had last been seen near his home in Shenzhen on 14 October 2015; three others would also disappear in the weeks that followed. The three were reported missing in November. Lee Bo (sometimes, Paul Lee, also, Lee Po) had been informing the media of the disappearances of his other four colleagues when he himself vanished from Hong Kong on 30 December. Lee's disappearance, due to the improbability that Lee had gone to Shenzhen while his mainland travel permit was left at home, crystallised a great deal of anxiety about the pattern of bookshop disappearances and of the possibility of cross-border renditions. Lee Bo's disappearance prompted Hong Kong Chief executive CY Leung to hold a press conference on 4 January 2016 in which he stated that it would be "unacceptable" and a breach of the Basic Law if mainland Chinese law officials were operating in Hong Kong.

Two weeks after Gui's disappearance, four men came to search his apartment – ostensibly for his computer – but left without it. A manager from the estate where Gui lived attempted to contact Gui on the number of the person who called her last regarding Gui. A taxi driver answered, saying that four men had left the telephone in the taxi, and that they had wanted to go to Poipet, a border town in Cambodia. Gui was last heard from on 6 November when he called his wife to tell her that he was safe but was unwilling to reveal his whereabouts. The Thai authorities have no record of Gui leaving the country. Gui's family contacted the Swedish embassy, and the Swedish police filed a report through Interpol. The Guardian observed that the Thai government had done little to advance the case, noting that the military junta was becoming increasingly accommodating to Chinese demands.

=== Confirmation of detention ===
Xinhua News Agency published an article on 17 January 2016 stating that an individual by the name of Gui Minhai had been detained relating to a fatal traffic accident in December 2003 in which a schoolgirl died. It is likely he was held under Residential Surveillance at a Designated Location. Xinhua alleged that Gui Minhai (桂敏海; Guì Mǐnhǎi;), with a different but identical-sounding middle character with respect to Gui Minhai the publisher, had fled abroad under the guise of a tourist in November 2004 using a borrowed identity card following the court case; his stated age was 46 years in 2005 – a discrepancy of five years compared with the details in Gui's Swedish passport. The two discrepancies created doubts that there may have been a case of mistaken identity. Xinhua claimed that Gui gave himself up to public security officials in October 2015. Contrary to Xinhua's claims, news reports from 2004 about the court proceedings from the traffic accident did not suggest Gui intended to abscond, instead he expressed a willingness to assume "full responsibility" in the form of economic compensation. Gui was given a probationary sentence at that time.

A video confession which was released at the same time and broadcast on China Central Television confirmed Gui's identity. In the 10-minute exclusive video, a tearful Gui expressed his remorse over a killing charge that he had absconded from a decade earlier. He said that his return to mainland China and his surrender were "my personal choice and had nothing to do with anyone else. I should shoulder my responsibility and I don't want any individual or institutions to interfere, or viciously hype up my return". Gui also said, "Although I have Swedish citizenship, I truly feel that I am still Chinese – my roots are in China. So I hope Sweden can respect my personal choice, respect my rights and privacy of my personal choice and allow me to resolve my own problems". Criminal investigations on other charges were said to be in progress. It was only on 19 January, when fellow Swedish citizen Peter Dahlin, cofounder of an NGO providing legal training for local lawyers in China, appeared on television, confessing to having violated Chinese law and "caused harm to the Chinese government [and] hurt the feelings of the Chinese people", that it came to international attention that Gui had also confessed on television; Dahlin was subsequently deported. Reporters Without Borders condemned China's forced confessions, and urged the EU to sanction CCTV and Xinhua for "knowingly peddling lies and statements presumably obtained under duress". Lee Bo's letter to his wife on 17 January said that he had voluntarily gone to the mainland to assist Chinese law enforcement in an investigation that involved Gui. He denounced Gui as "a morally unacceptable person" who had got him into trouble with the authorities.

Gui's video confession broadcast on China Central Television on 17 January 2016

Gui's confession was received with incredulity, and many of the facts surrounding his disappearance from Thailand, including the release of the video three months after his disappearance, were called into question. The president of the Legislative Council of Hong Kong, Jasper Tsang, said: "the China Central Television (CCTV) report [and broadcast of Gui Minghau's confession] did not seem to be able to calm the public. As the case drags on, there will be more speculation". Human Rights Watch was quoted as saying: "Given that Gui has been held nearly three months incommunicado, in a secret location, and without a lawyer, his confession on state-controlled TV lacks credibility". The Washington Post said: "The narrative seems messy and incoherent, blending possible fact with what seems like outright fiction. It feels illogical, absurd even". Amnesty International's China researcher cast doubt on the narrative, asking: "Why would four other employees of a company need to go missing in order to assist with a regular criminal case? How could other missing or otherwise investigated colleagues of Gui Minhai have any connection to the case?" The Guardian drew a connection to Operation Fox Hunt, a Chinese government campaign launched by Xi Jinping in 2014 to repatriate corrupt officials or opponents of the regime who had fled abroad, and which may also have been responsible for the abduction of the other missing booksellers. By mid-June 2016, Gui's family had not yet received official confirmation that he was under detention, according to Gui's daughter.

=== Reaction to detention ===
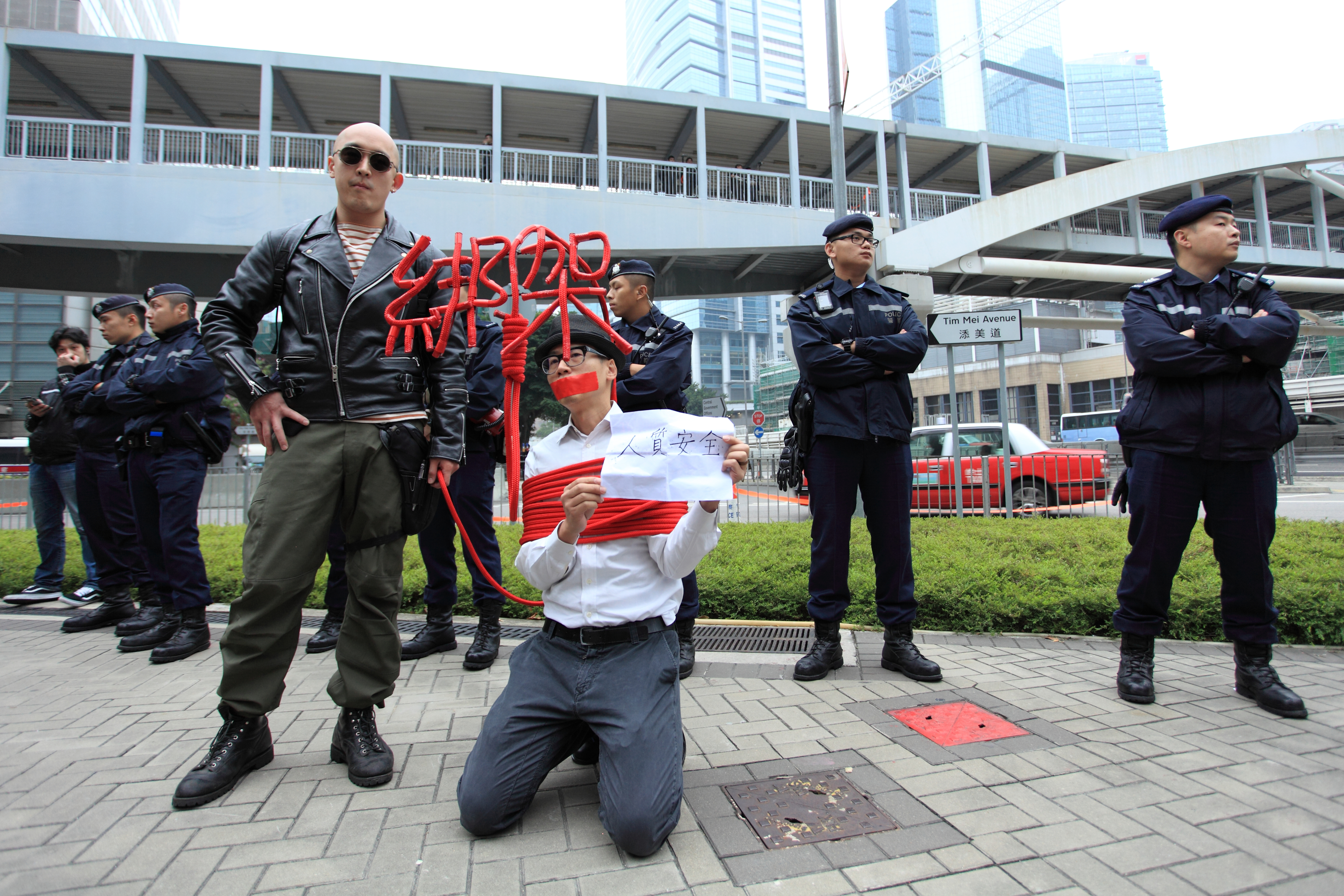
Artist Kacey Wong protesting against the Causeway Bay booksellers disappearances. The sign in his hand says "Hostage is well". 10 February 2016

Bei Ling, a personal friend of Gui and president of Independent Chinese PEN, said that Gui had not given himself up voluntarily but had in fact been abducted. He confirmed that there had indeed been a drink-driving case involving Gui in which a young woman was killed but that the accident and his disappearance were unrelated. Bei asserted that there was no official record of Gui's departure from Thailand, and that international law had been violated by Gui's kidnapping. He speculated that the abductors had returned to Gui's apartment to retrieve his passport, and that Gui may have been sent to China from Cambodia on a plane loaded with Chinese deportees. Gui's daughter Angela had been notified of her father's disappearance in an email from Lee Bo dated 10 November in which Lee said he feared Gui had been taken to China "for political reasons". Angela dismissed the assertion that her father had returned to the mainland voluntarily.

Sweden has repeatedly requested transparency from China, and summoned the Thai ambassador for information in December. After the appearance of the video confession, the Swedish foreign ministry reported that a Swedish envoy was finally allowed to visit Gui. In January 2016, Swedish foreign minister Margot Wallström condemned the forced confessions of Dahlin and Gui (who are both Swedish citizens) on Chinese television, terming them "unacceptable". The Chinese government has said that Gui was first and foremost a Chinese subject, and the Swedish government seems to have quietly accepted this position. The Swedish diplomatic effort has been through consular channels and has been low-profile.

In late February 2016, state media appeared to clarify the charges against Gui, saying that Gui was being held for "illegal business operations". He is alleged to have knowingly distributed books not approved by China's press and publication authority – according to the charges, some 4,000 such books had been sent by post disguised as different books to 380 buyers in 28 cities in mainland China since October 2014. Also in early February, the European Parliament issued a statement asking for Gui, Lee Bo, and their three colleagues at Causeway Bay Books to be released immediately. In his report on Hong Kong for the second half of 2015, British Foreign Secretary Philip Hammond expressed concern about the Causeway Bay Books disappearances, and said in particular that the abduction of Gui's colleague Lee Bo, a British citizen, from Hong Kong was "a serious breach of the Sino-British Joint Declaration on Hong Kong and undermines the principle of one country, two systems".

Gui's detention was discussed at the US Congressional-Executive Committee on China in May. In September, Angela spoke before the United Nations Human Rights Council, and also made an emotional plea on behalf of her father on Swedish television, an appearance which prompted another public statement by Wallström on the detention. The Swedish government, which said that they had been involved in "quiet diplomacy" with the Chinese regime, secured a second audience with Gui after 11 months of detention.

A year after Gui's disappearance, there was a general consensus among commentators that the five booksellers had been abducted by Chinese authorities. As of October 2016, Gui has spent a year in detention, while the other four men were released in early March 2016. One colleague, Lam Wing-kee, gave an interview that received significant media coverage in which he spoke in great detail about his abduction and his months in detention by mainland law enforcement in Ningbo and subsequently Shaoguan. Their other colleagues have remained low profile and refused comment.

In June 2017, Swedish Prime Minister Stefan Löfven talked to Chinese leader Xi Jinping during a state visit about the case of Gui Minhai.

=== Release from PSB custody and apparent recapture ===
According to Chinese officials, Gui Minhai was set free on 17 October 2017; Sweden's Foreign Ministry had received notification from the Chinese authorities that Gui had been released, "although neither his daughter nor Swedish authorities knew of his whereabouts" for a certain time afterwards. On 19 January 2018, a group of about 10 men in plain clothes boarded a train bound for Beijing and pulled Gui from the train. Gui was on his way to a medical examination in Beijing accompanied by two senior Swedish diplomats, according to his daughter, Angela. The Swedish government acknowledges the incident. In early February, Gui again appeared in a confession before reporters from pro-establishment news outlets including the South China Morning Post of Hong Kong. Gui, who had been in custody or under close surveillance for the past two years, appeared to have been freed in October 2017. He said that Sweden had sensationalised his case and tricked him into an unsuccessful attempt to leave China using a medical appointment at the Swedish embassy in Beijing as a pretext. They would supposedly wait for an opportunity to repatriate Gui to Sweden. Human Rights Watch and Amnesty International denounced "this sort of contrived [confession] made in incommunicado detention". Sweden later condemned China's "brutal intervention" in Gui's case the following week.

=== Misinformation campaign ===
A study by the Australian Strategic Policy Institute which analysed the tweets of Chinese government-controlled accounts banned by Twitter in response to the 2019–20 Hong Kong protests found that the accounts also targeted Gui Minhai. Other dissidents targeted by the bot network included Guo Wengui and Yu Wensheng as well as striking PLA veterans. The misinformation campaign ran from 23 January to 23 February 2018. 23 January was the day news broke that Gui had been seized off a train.

=== Backdoor diplomacy controversy ===
In February 2019, Gui's daughter Angela made a blog post documenting a "very strange experience" involving Anna Lindstedt, Sweden's ambassador to China. In it, she alleged that Lindstedt contacted her in mid-January and invited her to a meeting in Stockholm that she had set up with some Chinese businessmen who she thought could help secure her father's release.

Angela recounted in her blog that the meetings were held at a private lounge in a Stockholm hotel, where she was sequestered for days, and was even escorted to and from the bathroom. The men, who claimed to have "connections within the Chinese Communist Party", apparently used a mixture of inducements, manipulation and threats on her. She was told that her father's release would be contingent on her stopping her campaign and avoiding media engagement. They offered her a Chinese visa as well as a job in the Chinese embassy. To Angela, Ambassador Lindstedt's presence and seemingly supportive stance suggested the talks were initiated by the Swedish foreign ministry. She nevertheless felt uncomfortable with the meetings. When she later made inquiries of the Swedish foreign ministry, it said it was unaware of the events.

The Chinese embassy in Stockholm denied any involvement; the Swedish foreign ministry said it was not aware of the events until after the meetings had taken place. It confirmed to the press that the ambassador had been recalled, and that an internal investigation into the incident was under way. On 9 December, Lindstedt was charged by Swedish prosecutors for "arbitrariness during negotiations with a foreign power", with a possible maximum prison sentence of 2 years.

=== 2020 trial and sentence ===
Gui was detained for charges related to "illegal business operations", according to Chinese officials. However, it was announced on 25 February 2020 that he was tried for "illegally providing intelligence overseas", and sentenced Gui to 10 years' imprisonment. Rights groups condemned the "harsh sentence"; Amnesty International said the charges were "completely unsubstantiated" and demanded his release.

Although Gui was a naturalised Swedish citizen who had renewed his passport sometime between late 2017 and mid-2018, the Ningbo Intermediate People's Court where Gui was tried said that Gui had applied to restore his Chinese citizenship in 2018 – a measure observers have described as an unprecedented move to cut off consular access. Peter Dahlin, fellow Swedish who had been made to confess on Chinese television before he was deported, commented: "the only 'state secrets' that Gui may have is knowledge about how Chinese agents kidnapped him in Thailand, and about the torture he had endured after being returned to China". Chinese officials have insisted someone like Gui is considered "a Chinese national first and foremost." Legal scholars and many overseas Chinese who have acquired foreign citizenship have expressed their great concern at the apparently selective application of Chinese nationality law that bans dual citizenship. Jerome A. Cohen and Donald C. Clarke, both respected legal scholars on China, said the use against a former Chinese citizen was in breach of Article 36 of the Vienna Convention on Consular Relations, and the move could foretell its use on any non-ethnic Chinese critic if they so please.

The Swedish Ministry for Foreign Affairs declared that Gui was still a citizen due to the fact that "Swedish citizenship can only be renounced after an examination and a decision by the Swedish Migration Agency". Sweden, which had been denied access to the trial, demanded that Gui be "released and that we have access to our citizens to provide consular support". The Chinese foreign ministry said consular arrangements were on hold, and would be restored once the coronavirus epidemic was "resolved". Willy Lam, senior fellow at the Jamestown Foundation, said: "At a time of national emergency, when parts of China have fallen under virtual martial law, authorities think they can do whatever they want."

The EU said "There are serious questions to be answered about this case. His rights, including inter alia to consular access and due process, have not been respected". Specifically referring to Gui as a "Swedish citizen", the United States demanded his immediate and unconditional release. US State Department said: "We will continue to stand with our partners and allies to promote greater respect for human rights and fundamental freedoms in China".

== Awards ==
In 2018, Gui was awarded the International Publishers Association's IPA Prix Voltaire.

In 2019, Gui was awarded the Tucholsky Prize by the Swedish PEN (Svenska PEN). The Chinese Embassy in Sweden decried the award to "a criminal that committed serious crimes in both China and Sweden", and threatened "bad consequences". The embassy also objected to the attendance of Culture Minister Amanda Lind at the ceremony, saying that Lind would be persona non grata in China if she attended. Since then, the Chinese government has imposed an unofficial ban on the export of graphite to Sweden.

== See also ==
- Lists of solved missing person cases

== Bibliography ==
- 二十世纪西方文化史掠影Beijing Normal University Press, 1991 ISBN 7810141120
- 北欧的神话传说Liaoning University Press, 1992 ISBN 7561017294
- 雍正十年: 那条瑞典船的故事China Social Sciences Press, 2006 ISBN 7801064194
- 《我把黑森林留给你》 香港文化艺术出版社, 2007
