= Kacey Wong =

Hong Kong artist (born 1970)

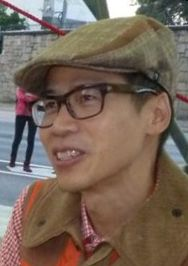
- Kacey Wong in 2014.
- Born: 1970 (age 55–56); Hong Kong
- Education: Cornell University (architecture); Chelsea College of Arts (sculpture); Royal Melbourne Institute of Technology (fine arts)
- Known for: Visual arts, architecture, sculpture
- Notable work: Drift City (2000), Wandering Home, (2008), Paddling Home (2009)

Chinese name
- Traditional Chinese: 黃國才
- Simplified Chinese: 黃国才
Transcriptions
Standard Mandarin
- Hanyu Pinyin: Huáng Guócái
Yue: Cantonese
- Jyutping: Wong4 Gwok3 Choi4
- Website: kaceywong.com

Kacey Wong (born 1970) is a Hong Kong visual artist and educator – formerly Assistant Professor at the School of Design, Hong Kong Polytechnic University. Wong has received the Hong Kong Contemporary Arts Award by the Hong Kong Art Museum (2012), Best Artist Award (2010); and Rising Artist Award and Outstanding Arts Education Award (2003). Wong is politically engaged through his art, and is founding member of art-activist groups Art Citizens and the Umbrella Movement Art Preservation.

Wong emigrated to Taiwan in July 2021 due to the crackdown in Hong Kong under the national security law.

== Early life and education ==
Wong Kwok-choi was born in 1970 in Hong Kong. Due to concerns about the future of Hong Kong at the time, Wong was sent away at the age of 14 to Long Island in the United States as a secondary school pupil. His chosen name "Kacey" is derived from the initials of his Chinese name. Wong was admitted to Cornell University, from where he obtained a bachelor's degree in Architecture. He has practiced internationally as an architect and artist. His sculptures explore philosophical ideas that engage the body of the viewer. He holds a master's degree in Sculpture at Chelsea College of Arts. Wong also obtained his Doctorate in Fine Arts from the Royal Melbourne Institute of Technology in 2003.

== Career ==
Upon graduation from university, Wong worked as an architect for nearly six years in New York, Japan, and Hong Kong, in the fields of graphic, interior and architectural design. He set up in independent practice. Finding that the professional world as an architect did not allow for the degree of freedom he desired, he gave up a well-paid professional career and left for further studies in England. After finishing the masters programme in London in 1998, Wong returned to Hong Kong and taught sculpture and art appreciation at the Chinese University of Hong Kong for two years. Wong later became Assistant professor in the school of design at the Hong Kong Polytechnic University, until 2015.

In 2003, Wong was bestowed the Rising Artist Award by the Hong Kong Arts Council and Outstanding Arts Education Award. The Hong Kong Museum of Art awarded Wong their Hong Kong Contemporary Arts Award in 2012.

== Works ==
Wong stated that most people take for granted what they possess, and may be without identity or culture. Wong says his self-awareness, and what Hong Kong represents to him, stem from the years he spent abroad. He says that only by living amidst a second culture can one fully come to realise what one represents and where one belongs. A thread that runs through much of his work is therefore the notion of home, homelessness and wandering. Since 2011, his repertoire has taken on a political dimension.

=== Space ===
Home (1999), Personal Skyscraper (2000), and City Space (2001) were exhibitions where Wong was both exhibitor and curator.

"10 Boxes: Everything I've Ever Thought About, I Put Inside a Box" in 2000 was Wong's first solo exhibition. The series of ten sculptures, housed in wall-mounted boxes, each having its own name, explores a different theme or spatial relationship. For example, Office Block symbolises the power structures within companies; Only You is based on romantic relations; Destroy Them treats subjects like education and childhood influences.

In 2008, Wong created Wandering Home, an installation consisting of a mobile home conceptualised on city living and the homeless, which was shown at the Venice Biennale of Architecture. The small tin hut on the back of a tricycle is a comment on Hong Kong society, and the plight of people who sleep on the streets and who are forced to move on periodically by government officials. Costing HK$5,000 to make, the house is not exactly a practical solution to the homeless, but the concept was tried out on street sleepers in Sham Shui Po. In 2008, Wong created Tin Man No.11, an essay in space in the form of a metallic robot that transforms into a bed. He extended the concept by creating Famiglia Grande, a series of transformable cases. In 2009, Wong attended the Subvision Festival in Hamburg as a skyscraper.

His work Paddling Home, a 4 ft × 4 ft (1.2 m × 1.2 m) floating house, was set to sea in January 2010. The work, symbolising the Hong Kong's property market where the accommodation is high-density, small and pricey, was selected at the Hong Kong & Shenzhen Bi City Biennale of Urbanism Architecture exhibition that year. The design includes tiled walls, wooden floorboards, bay windows, a television, air-conditioning, roof space from which to drive a few golf balls and a 5-horsepower outboard motor. It was priced at a symbolical HK$888,888 ($114,000). Wong said that, as the square foot price is [an astronomical] HK$55,555, Paddling Home is an ironic statement comparing the perils of owning a glitzily- and glossily-packaged high end residence to being on the high seas. When asked in 2012, Wong said he considers Paddling Home his most challenging work to date.

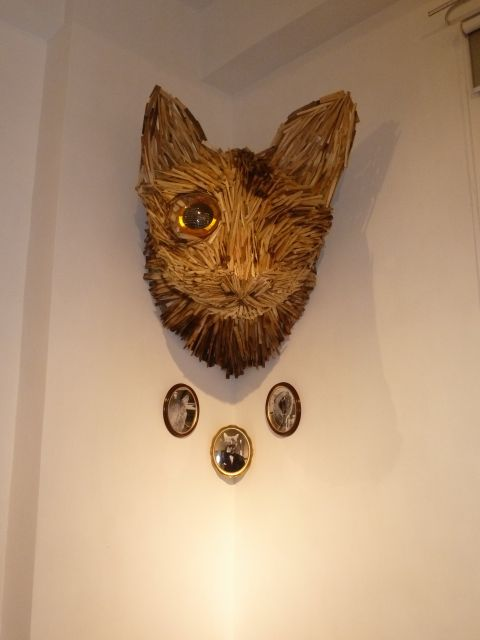
Ball Ball (2014)

He published a photographic book, Drift City 2000–2010, as the culmination of a ten-year project where he travelled the world and superposed himself as a cardboard skyscraper (Skyscraper Man) in different surroundings as a critique of modernism. For the project, Wong collected images from over 20 locations around the world, including one at the Egyptian pyramids made when he and his wife were on honeymoon in 2002. That image cost him a three-hour art lecture to police who demanded a substantial "photography fee".

=== Environmentalism ===
Wong became interested in environmentalism through visiting a waste reprocessing centre in Hong Kong, and realising just how little was recycled. His works re-use or recycle materials obtained from rubbish tips. In 2010, Wong curated "Memory of the Forest", a collection of animal sculptures by himself and 13 students made using discarded wood, which symbolises the animals' lost habitats. Wong contributed a similar "Mega Musical Art Piece" to the 2012 Hong Kong Cleanup campaign in the form of an octopus. Wong participated in a campaign of the Ocean Recovery Alliance in Hong Kong in April 2013, contributing Death by Amputation – a sculpture of a life-sized finned shark – to an exhibition in Stanley harbour in the hope that it would provoke thought on the source of food and the cruelty inflicted by humans on animals. In 2014, as part of an animal-themed exhibition with other artists, he unveiled Ball Ball, a substantial sculpture of his one-eyed cat again made of discarded wood.

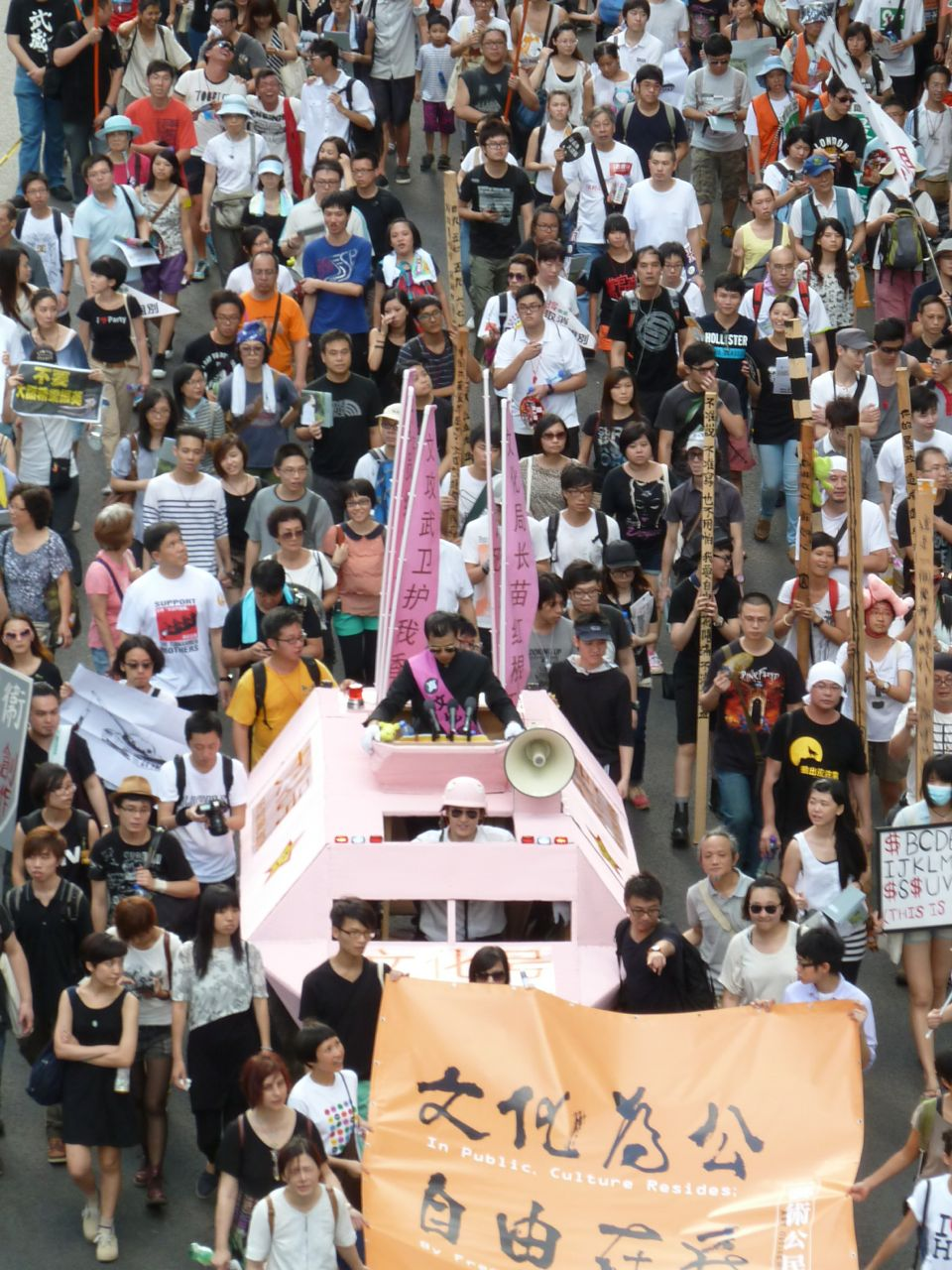
Wong's The Cultural Bureau leading 1 July 2012 protest march

=== Protest art ===
Wong cites his political awakening being in 2011, following the arrest of mainland artist Ai Weiwei. He responded by forming a group named Art Citizens (藝術公民), and rallied some 2,000 artists to march for Ai on 23 April. As curator for the group, he put together a month-long exhibition that opened on 26 May named "Love the Future" (愛未來) – a pun on Ai's name – with works of over 50 artists. Wong's own showpiece, a Caonima (alpaca) sculpture, was one of the stars of the show. Since then, Wong has become known for his highly visible displays at public demonstrations drawing attention to Hong Kong's political situation.

Fond of quoting Ai, Wong believes that art and politics are indissociable, and that no art is completely without political connotation. Wong sees art as one of the organic elements in the mix of political movements, playing an indirect and auxiliary role.

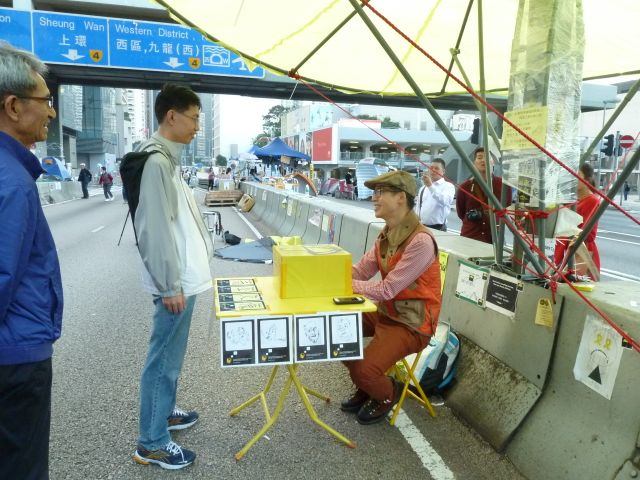
Wong drawing portraits during the Umbrella Revolution

Wong was highly active during the Umbrella Revolution: he held a contest for the best logo to elevate awareness and generate more concern for the demand for "real universal suffrage" for Hong Kong. Using social media as a "safe platform" for universal participation, he generated considerable awareness and received entries from all over the world. Wong held sessions where he would draw a person's portrait in one minute without looking at the paper – the concept inspired by Nelson Mandela's maxim "It always seems impossible until it's done". He also co-founded Umbrella Movement Art Preservation, to make an inventory of works and their locations at protest sites, aiming to rescue key pieces before police clearances.

For his personal exhibition in March 2015 entitled "Resisting Against Absurdity", Wong reunited pieces he created for previous protest marches and added new works: in particular the Black Cop Candle – a set of wax statues of policemen in riot gear and raised batons. These symbolise the seven "black" (meaning corrupt) cops who beat up protester Ken Tsang, and who were caught on film so doing during the 2014 protests; lighting the candles would melt them and transform them into light.

==== Performance art ====
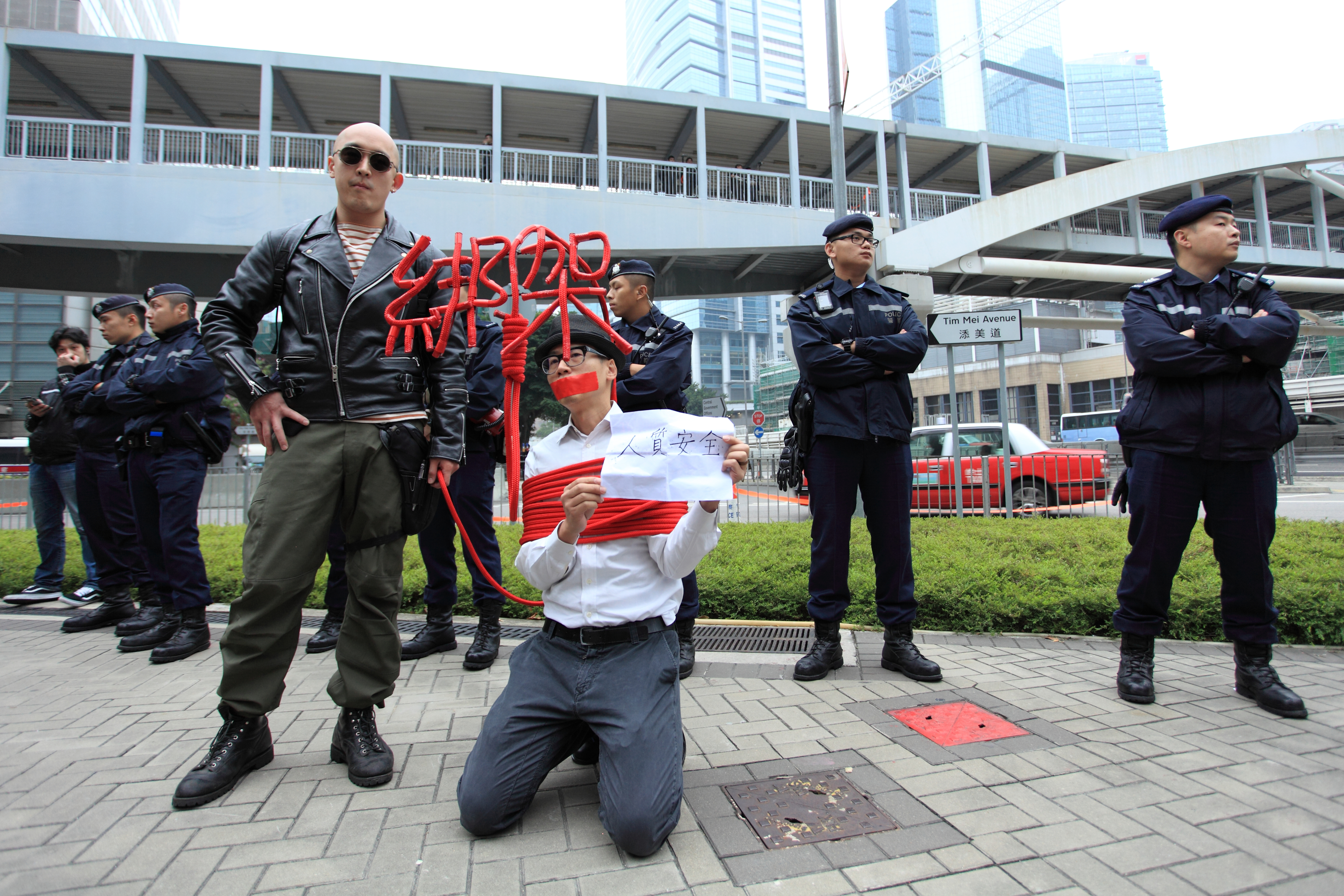
Wong protesting at booksellers' disappearances with red gallows bearing the Chinese characters for "abduction" as props

Wong has variously participated in the annual 1 July protest marches riding in a pink armoured personnel carrier, walking around with a facsimile washing machine on his head, and guiding a 10-foot red robot he created. For the march on 1 July 2014, Wong created the "Warning Squad", where he and several people dressed as police officers holding parody banners inspired by those increasingly seen used by police officers at protests. His signs included "Love the Party" – echoing the CPC slogan "Love the country, love the Party" (愛國愛黨) – "Fake Commie"; "Party-State" referring to the one-party state within China; "Reddening" referring to the gradual infiltration of the communist ethos into Hong Kong; "Land Grabbing" referring to the land acquisition for development in the Northeast New Territories. At a march protesting at the disappearances of the staff of Causeway Bay Books in 2015, Wong symbolically constructed a red gallows carrying the Chinese characters for "abduction" (綁架), bound himself with red rope and gagged himself with red duct tape.

In the run-up to the 30th anniversary of the 1989 Tiananmen Square protests, Wong performed "The Loveliest Person" dressed as a dead soldier playing a funereal version of the Chinese national anthem. Wearing a spoiled khaki green uniform with a combat helmet, he played Frédéric Chopin's funeral march Piano Sonata No.2, overlaid the March of the Volunteers on the accordion whilst walking around the bustling Causeway Bay district for two hours.

For one of the protest marches during the 2019–20 Hong Kong protests, Wong created a mobile red-barred prison cell. Dressed as a mainland Chinese policeman, he proceeded to "arrest" participants in the pro-democracy demonstration and publicly whip them. Wong likens the imagery to "painting the nightmare". His performances changed as street violence escalated. Wong performed Black Flag during the 1 July march. Dressed all in black, he wore a mask, and waved a large black version of Hong Kong's red-and-white bauhinia flag which represents 'live free or die' – being the spirit of the time. In an August performance named The Five Commandments, Wong injected humour by adopting the persona of Moses, holding a staff and a tablet inscribed with the 5 key demands, hoping it would be a reminder that "art can play a humanistic role even in the worst moments."

=== Other roles ===
Wong co-founded Street Design Union to study and advance the role of artists and designers in the socio-political sphere. Since 2001, he has taken his "Personal Skyscraper Workshops" to primary schools to encourage children to admire the architecture. He does this by having pupils create wearable architectural clothing with foam boards and paper.

In 2016, the M+ in Hong Kong commissioned Wong to create the "M+ Rover" – a mobile gallery for their schools outreach programme. The Rover was created out of a hollowed-out container in which was installed a wooden interior using disused pallets to create the feel of a whale.

During the 2019 Hong Kong local elections, Wong was active in the campaign that saw the election of fellow artist Clara Cheung in the Happy Valley constituency of the Wan Chai District Council.

== Personal ==
Wong is an avid fan of war-games – an activity he partakes in every week which he says helps with mental agility. He also enjoys diving. Wong and his wife Margaret live with Ballball – a cat which had lost an eye in an accident. Wong chose to adopt him over other cats because he was unique. Wong said: "Imagine you were to go to a pet shop and ask for a one-eyed cat... 'Sorry we don't do those' would be the response".

In July 2021, Wong emigrated to Taiwan, without telling anyone. He wrote that Taiwan's vibrant cultural scene allowed him opportunities for growth. In his suitcase, he had packed a copy of the final issue of Apple Daily and the accordion he used in "The Patriot". His decision to leave was driven by the shrinking of personal freedoms in Hong Kong under the national security law. The arrest in January of 53 politicians and activists, many of whom were Wong's friends, for holding or participating in a primary election for the 2020 Legislative Council elections warned him that "law and order [had] collapsed". The publication by the pro-Beijing Ta Kung Pao of a list of artists and organisations which the paper deemed to be anti-government and potential violators of the national security law rang closer to home.
