= Bei Ling =

Chinese poet, and journal editor

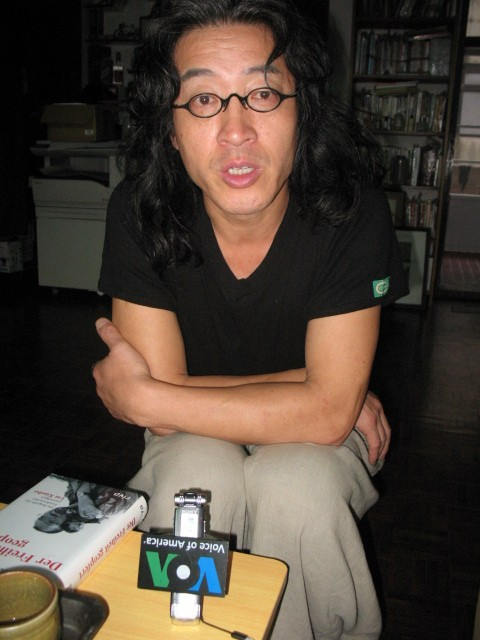
- Born: December 28, 1959 (age 66); Beijing
- Education: Capital University of Economics and Business, Brown University
- Writing career
- Genre: Poetry
- Movement: Independent Chinese PEN Center

Bei Ling (Chinese: 貝嶺) (born December 28, 1959, in Beijing) is a Chinese poet, and journal editor. He is usually associated with the Chinese misty poets.

== Life ==
He came to the United States as an exchange student, he was a fellow at Brown University. After the Tiananmen Square protests of 1989, in 1992, he founded the literary journal 傾向 (Tendency).

In 2000, he opened an office in Beijing.

He launched a literary magazine named Tendency in 1993 as a platform for young underground writers' talents. On August 13, 2000, he was detained for 14 days at the Qinghe Detention Center, and charged with "illegal publication." After an international protest, he was fined $24,000, and deported.

He lives in Boston, and New York City. He founded the Independent Chinese PEN Center together with Liu Xiaobo and later became its president

In 2009, he sought dialogue with Chinese officials at the Frankfurt Book Fair. In 2010, he wrote about Liu Xiaobo in The Wall Street Journal. In 2011, he organized a letter in support of Ai Weiwei. In 2016, he was prominent in the campaign to preserve freedom of expression in Hong Kong after the Causeway Bay Books disappearances, one of whom was Gui Minhai, his friend since the 1980s.

== Works ==
- 主題與變奏, 貝嶺, 黎明文化事業股份有限公司, 1994, ISBN 978-957-16-0334-6
- 政治, 再见, Havel, Vaclav 哈维尔, 貝嶺, 林宗憲, 左岸文化: 傾向出版社出版, 2003, ISBN 978-986-7854-26-1
- 半先知與賣文人: 哈維爾評論集, 貝嶺, 鄭純宜, 傾向出版社, 2004, ISBN 978-957-0329-87-2
- 在土星的光環下 : 蘇珊·桑塔格紀念文選, 貝嶺, 傾向, 2007, ISBN 978-957-28408-6-3
- Wandering in March
- The Deceived

=== Works in English ===
- Bei Ling selected poems, 貝嶺, Willis Barnstone, Denis Mair, 傾向出版社, 2006, ISBN 978-957-28408-3-2
