= Causeway Bay Books =

Bookstore in Taipei, Taiwan

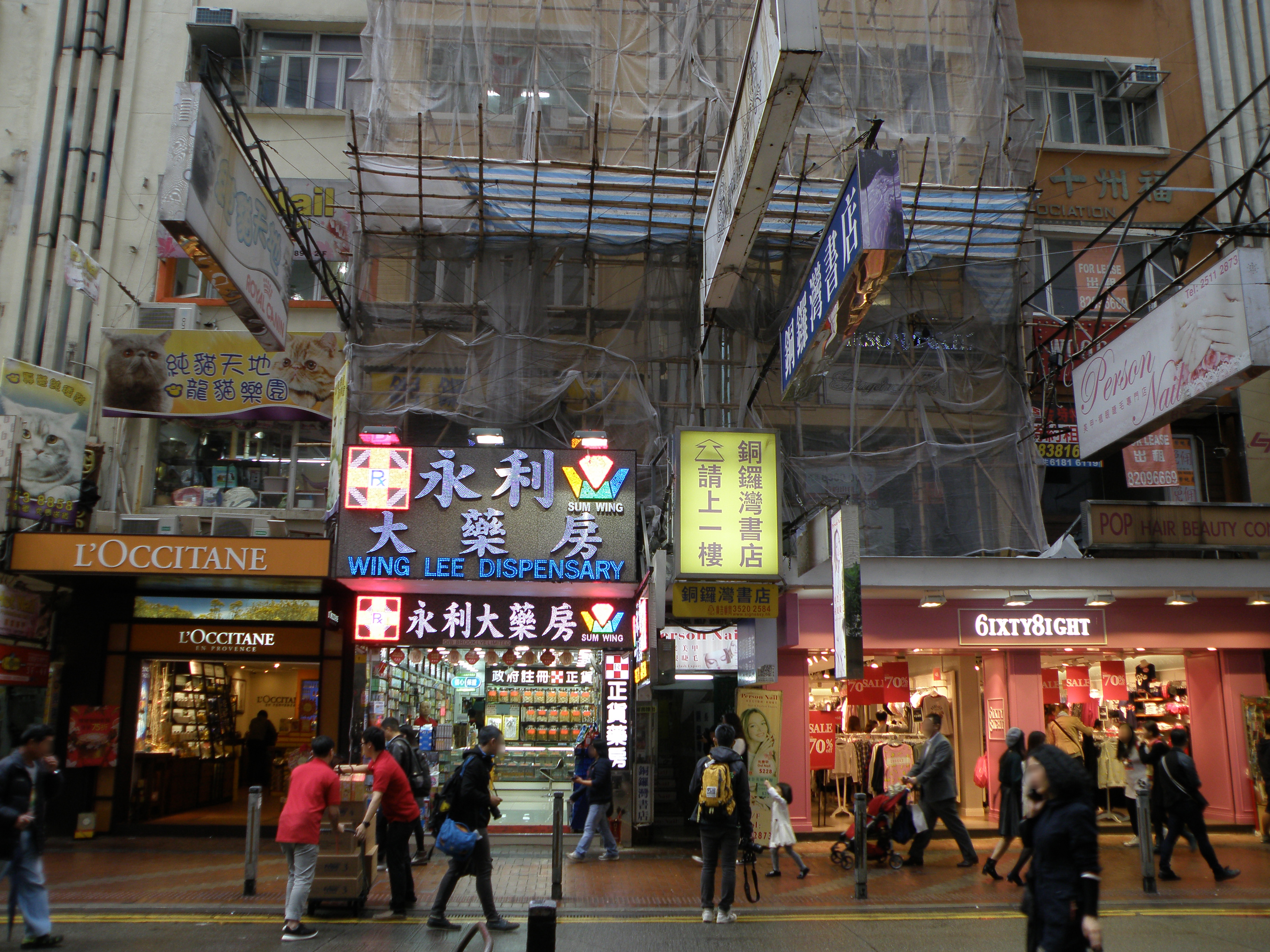
- The original bookstore at 531 Lockhart Road, Causeway Bay, Hong Kong
- Traditional Chinese: 銅鑼灣書店
- Simplified Chinese: 铜锣湾书店
Transcriptions
Standard Mandarin
- Hanyu Pinyin: Tóngluó Wān Shūdiàn
Yue: Cantonese
- Jyutping: Tung^{4}lo^{4} Waan^{1*4} Syu^{1}dim^{3}

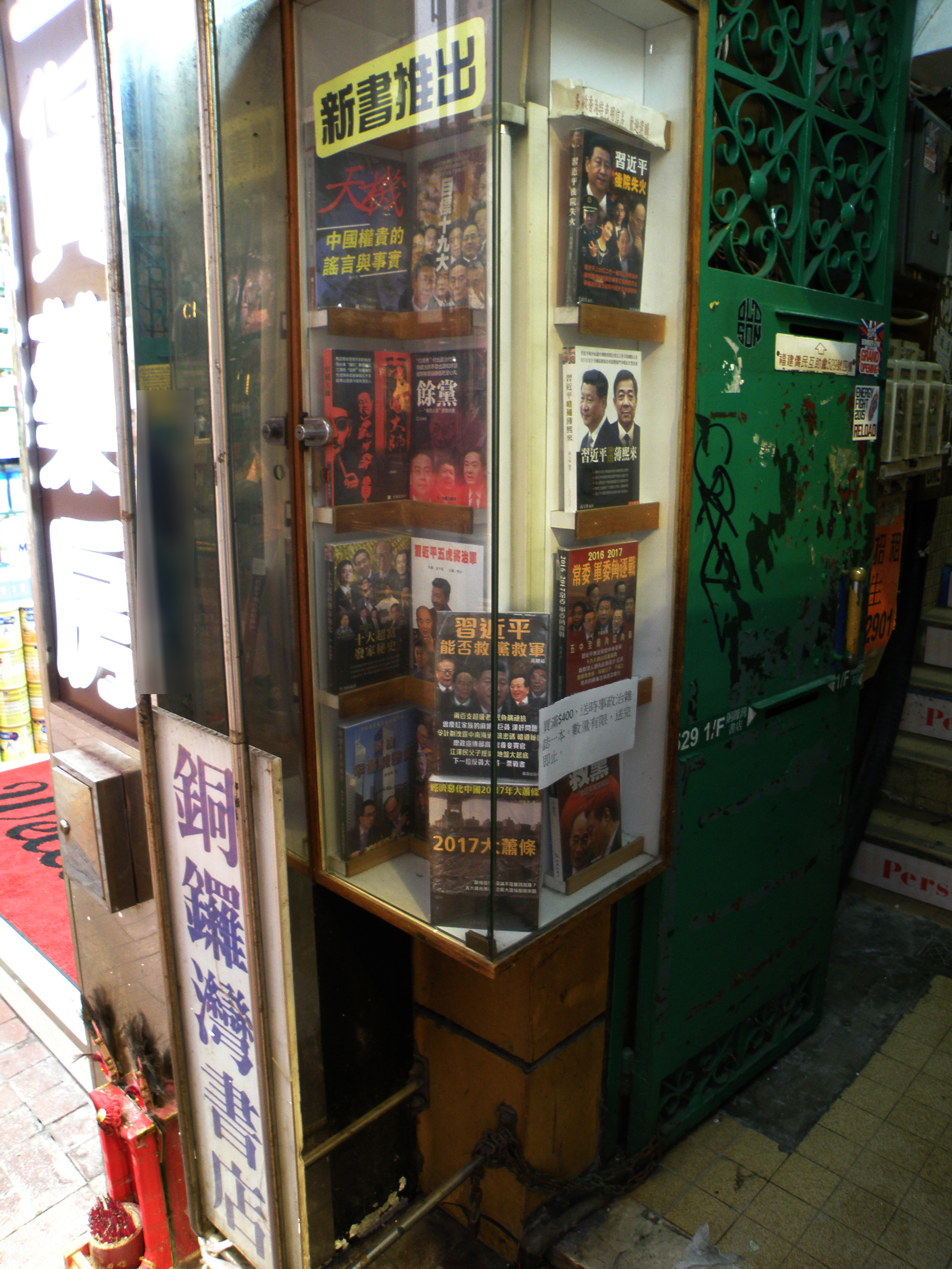
Showcase at street level

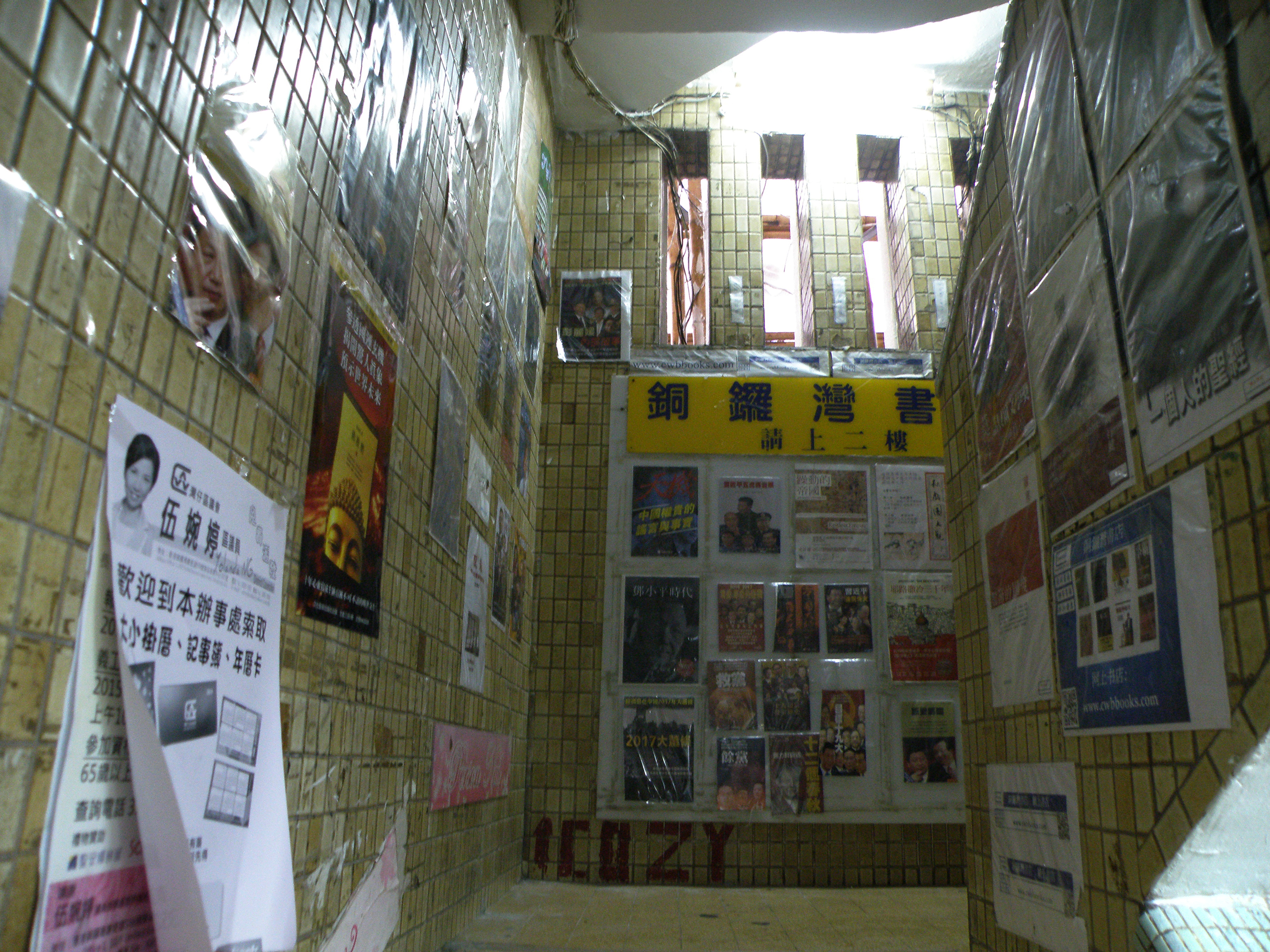
Stairwell with bookstore posters

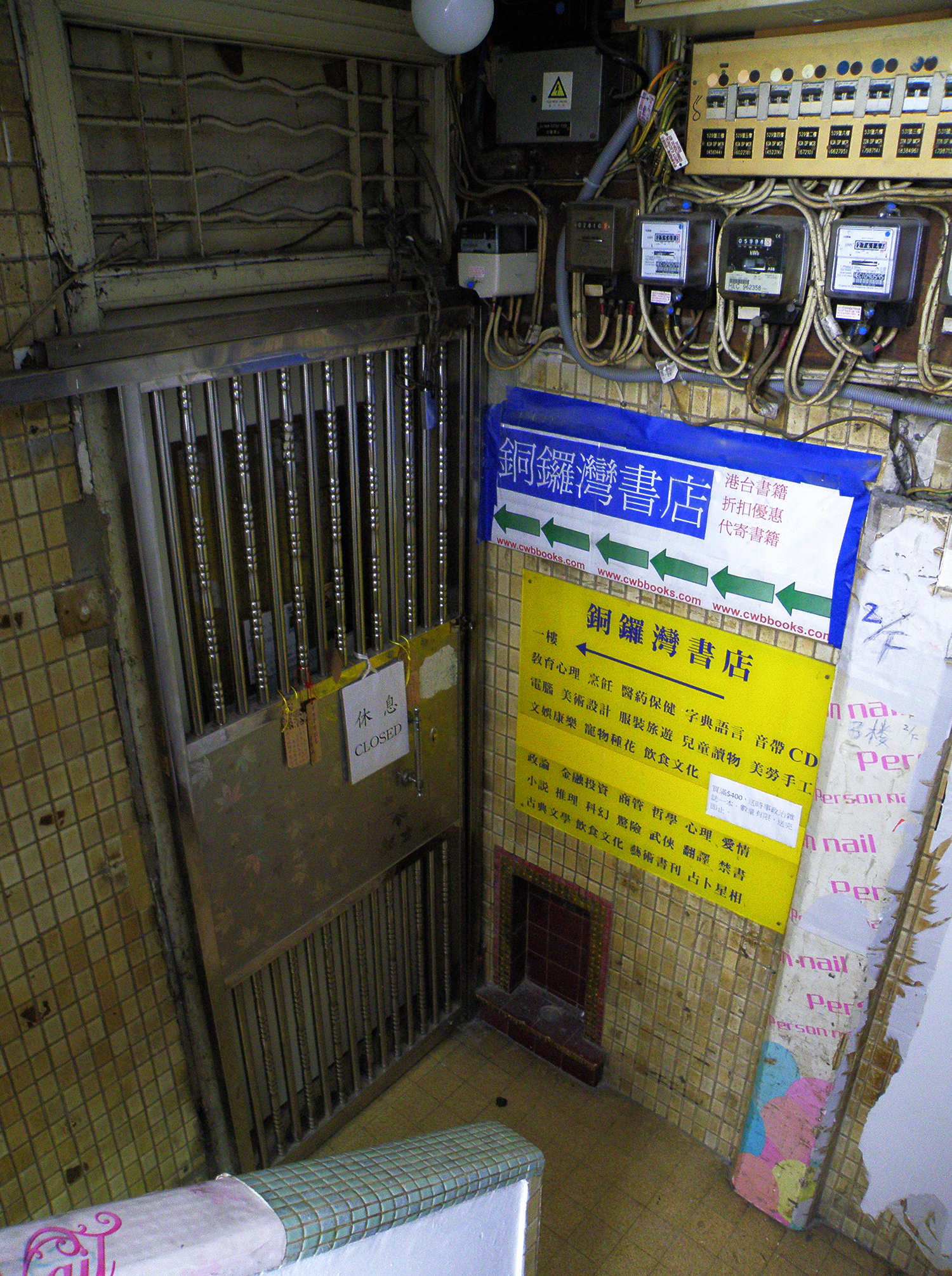
The first bookstore's gate was drawn in December 2015 after the disappearance of its last staff member, Lee Bo.

Causeway Bay Books is an independent bookstore in Taipei, Taiwan, which until December 2015 was an upstairs bookstore located in Causeway Bay, Hong Kong. The first bookstore in Hong Kong was popular with tourists from mainland China looking for books on Chinese politics and politicians which were not available in mainland China. In late 2015, five people associated with the store disappeared, sparking international concern. The first bookstore closed after the disappearance of its last staff member, Lee Bo, in December 2015. A second version of the bookstore was opened in Taipei, Taiwan in April 2020 by Lam Wing-kee, the founder of the original Hong Kong store and one of the five people who disappeared.

== First bookstore in Hong Kong ==
The first version of the bookstore in Hong Kong was founded in 1994 by Lam Wing-kee. Located on Hong Kong Island on the second floor of 531 Lockhart Road, Causeway Bay, the first bookstore occupied an area of nearly 300 square feet (28 m^{2}). In addition to general literary history books, the first bookstore also sold books on topics that are considered sensitive and therefore banned in China. Many mainland Chinese people that came to Hong Kong as tourists made a special trip to the bookstore to purchase books on politics.

In 2014, Lam Wing-kee sold the first bookstore to Mighty Current Media Ltd., but stayed on as its manager. From September 2014, the company had three shareholders: Gui Minhai (34%), Sophie Choi (34%) and Lui Bo (32%). According to industry sources, Mighty Current is a prolific publisher with a number of publishing subsidiaries, and this group may be responsible for 30 to 60 percent of the output of salacious books about Chinese political figures that are widely available at newsstands and book stores, including one at Hong Kong International Airport.

=== 2015 disappearances at the first bookstore ===
In 2015, major figures associated with the first bookstore disappeared, with some later confirmed to have been abducted by the Chinese government.

- Lui Bo (呂波, born 1970), the manager and one of the three shareholders of Mighty Current, whose last known location was in the bookstore. On 14 October 2015, he logged on to the bookstore computer for the last time. Unconfirmed sources state that he was taken away from his wife's home in Shenzhen.
- Gui Minhai (桂民海, born 1966), a Swedish national and one of the three shareholders of Mighty Current, was taken away from his home in Pattaya, Thailand by an unknown man on 17 October 2015. Gui had written some 200 books during his ten years as author/publisher. He was last heard from on 6 November when he called his wife to tell her that he was safe but was unwilling to reveal his whereabouts. Gui's family contacted the Swedish embassy, and the Swedish police filed a report through Interpol. The Thai authorities have no record of him leaving the country.

According to Bei Ling, there were rumours that a book was the main reason of Gui's disappearance. Lee Bo thought so too. The publication is an e-book entitled Xi Jinping and his Mistresses. There are two versions, the first having 135 pages and the second having 155 pages. They are published at the end of January and the start of February 2016.

- Lam Wing-kee (林榮基, born 1955), the founder of Causeway Bay Books, went missing on 24 October 2015. He habitually spent long hours at the bookshop and occasionally slept there. According to Lam, he went across the border to Shenzhen, where he was abducted by mainland police, blindfolded and interrogated for months. His wife filed a missing persons report with the police on 5 November and his family received a telephone call from him several hours later; Lam returned to Hong Kong from the mainland eight months after he disappeared and immediately went to the police station to cancel his missing person's report, refusing all other comment. Three days later, on the day he was due to return to the mainland, he held a press briefing during which he claimed that he was detained by the mainland officials at the Hong Kong-China border control in Shenzhen on 24 October 2015. Without being told what offence he had committed, he was stripped of his rights of access to a lawyer and to inform family members of his detention and taken to Ningbo and held under 24-hour guard by the Central Task Force, which reports to central leadership. After March 2016, Lam was transferred to Shaoguan, where he worked in a library, but he was prevented from leaving the mainland. In June 2016, he was given permission to return to Hong Kong so he could collect a hard drive containing information of the bookstore's customers. However, he used the opportunity to flee mainland Chinese custody and publicly announced details of how he had been abducted. He also stated that his confession on mainland TV in February 2016 was scripted, and that Lee Bo's televised confession was similarly forced. In April 2019, Lam moved to Taiwan over the possibility at the time he could be extradited to mainland China, due to the proposal of a now-withdrawn extradition bill.
- Cheung Jiping (張志平, born 1983), a manager of Mighty Current, was taken away from his wife's home in Fenggang, Dongguan by at least a dozen men in plainclothes.
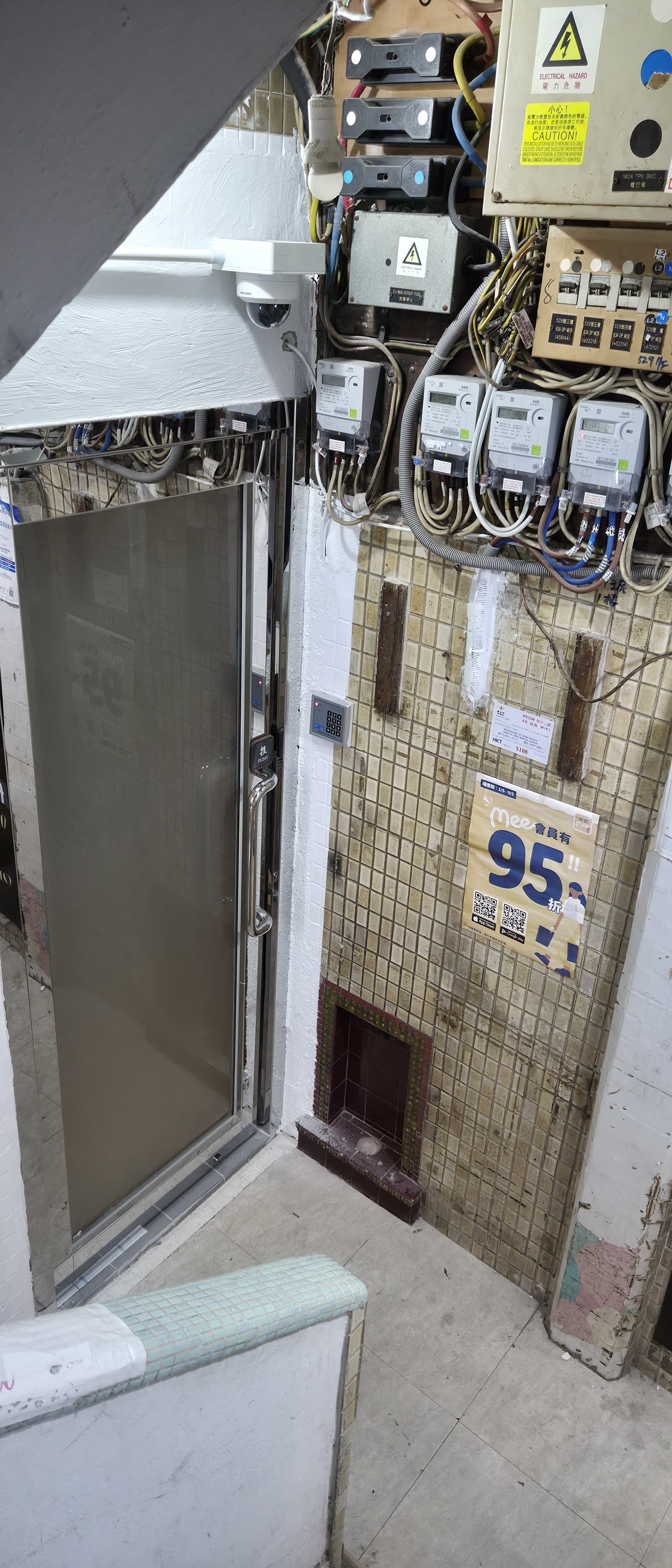
- The former storefront, April 2026
  Lee Bo (aka Paul Lee, 李波, born 1950), a British citizen and the husband of Sophie Choi, who is in turn one of the three shareholders of Mighty Current. Lee regularly helped out in the bookstore. Lee worked at Joint Publishing until he started at the bookstore. Since the disappearances of four of his colleagues, he had been doing anonymous interviews with BBC and various media. Lee was last seen on 30 December 2015, while delivering books in Chai Wan to a certain unknown client. Choi, who had been expecting Lee home for dinner at around 7.15 pm on 30 December, raised the alarm when he failed to return home. After he, the first bookstore's last staff member, disappeared, the first version of the bookstore shut down.

==== FCO report to UK Parliament ====
In its semi-annual report on Hong Kong for the second half of 2015, the British Foreign Secretary said: "The unexplained disappearance of five individuals associated with a Hong Kong bookstore and publishing house has raised questions in Hong Kong. I am particularly concerned by the situation of Mr Lee Po, a British citizen. The full facts of the case remain unclear, but our current information indicates that Mr Lee was involuntarily removed to the mainland without any due process under Hong Kong SAR law. This constitutes a serious breach of the Sino-British Joint Declaration on Hong Kong and undermines the principle of "One Country, Two Systems" which assures Hong Kong residents of the protection of the Hong Kong legal system. We have called, in our contacts with the Chinese government at the highest level, for Mr Lee's immediate return to Hong Kong. We urge the Chinese and Hong Kong SAR governments to reassure the people of Hong Kong that law enforcement in the Hong Kong SAR is exclusively the responsibility of the Hong Kong SAR authorities, and that the fundamental rights and freedoms of Hong Kong residents will continue to be fully protected, and respected by all, in accordance with the Joint Declaration and Basic Law."

=== Destruction of first bookstore's stocks ===
Up until the disappearances, the first bookstore maintained a stock of books for sale – in excess of 100,000 units – in two warehouses. One of the warehouses, containing some 45,000 books, was emptied according to the instructions of shareholder Sophie Choi, and one helper at the bookshop said that Choi ordered the stock destroyed in the hope that the return of Lee Bo, her husband, would be expedited.

== Second bookstore in Taipei ==
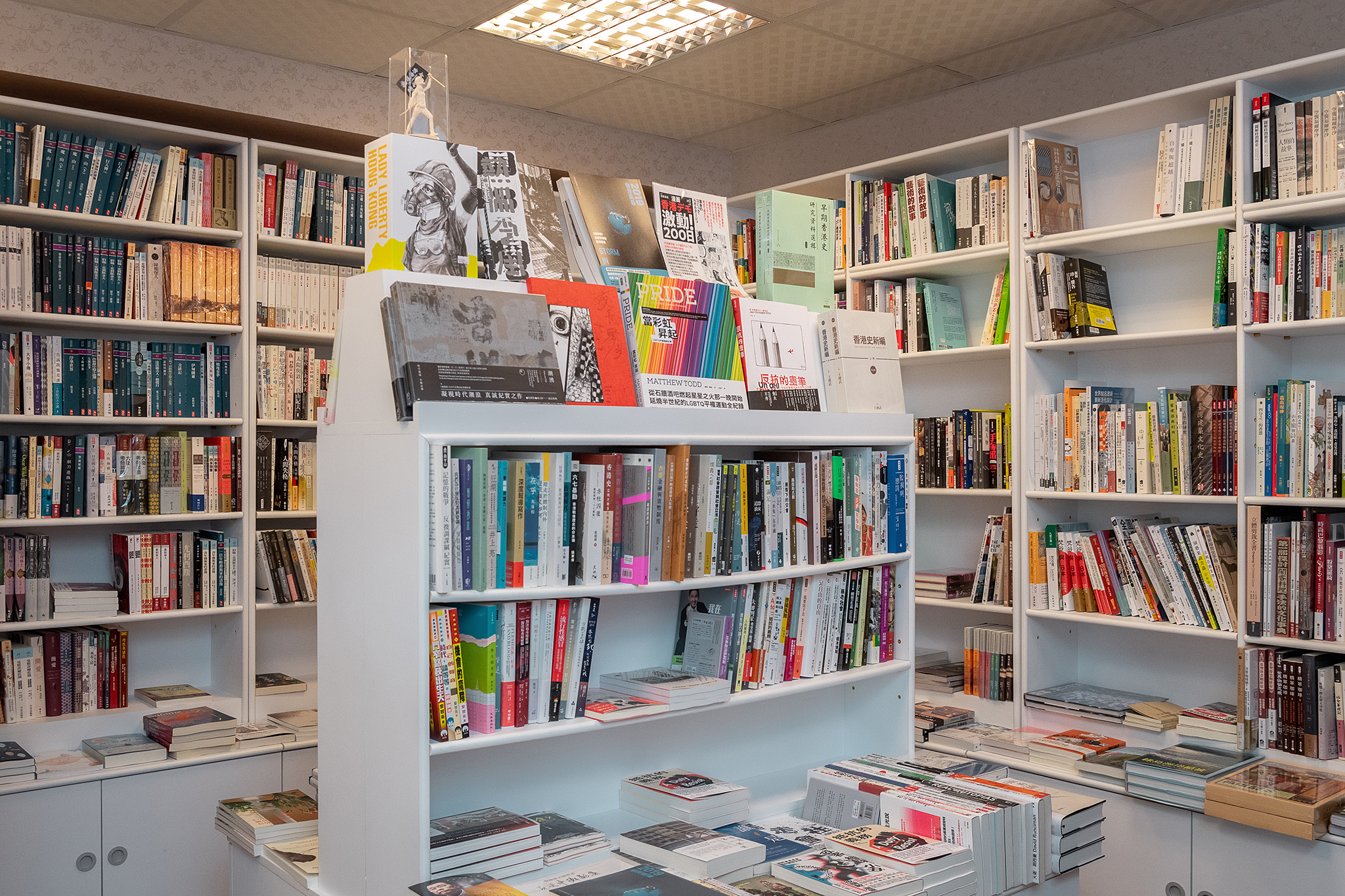
Zhongshan Causeway Bay Books

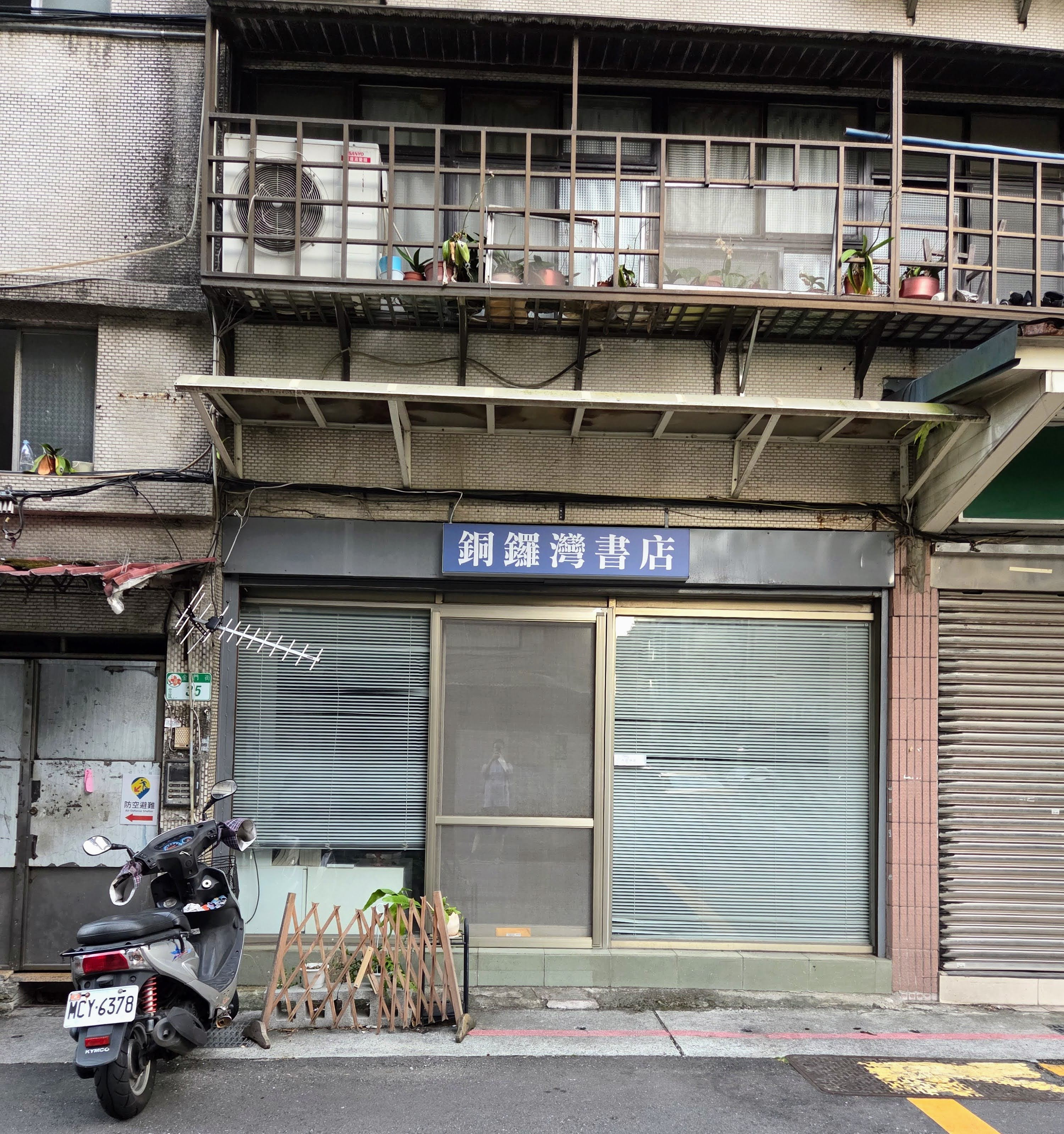
Zhongzhing Causeway Bay Books

Lam Wing-kee opened a second version of the bookstore in Taipei, Taiwan, which opened on 25 April 2020, located on the 10th floor of a commercial building near the Zhongshan metro station. A few days earlier on 20 April, a company accused Lam of infringing on their trademark on the Chinese name for the bookstore (銅鑼灣書店), which Lam claimed was a fake bookstore opened elsewhere in Taipei to target his. On 21 April, Lam was splashed with red paint and three suspects were arrested the next day. President Tsai Ing-wen sent flowers and a congratulatory note on the day of the Taipei bookshop's opening, and Legislative Yuan speaker You Si-kun and Democratic Progressive Party secretary-general Luo Wen-jia were in attendance.

In September 2024, due to the lease expiring at the Zhongshan location, the bookstore relocated to a ground floor address in Zhongzheng District.
