= Causeway Bay Books disappearances =

2015 Hong Kong bookstore staff kidnappings

- Part of Hong Kong–Mainland China conflict
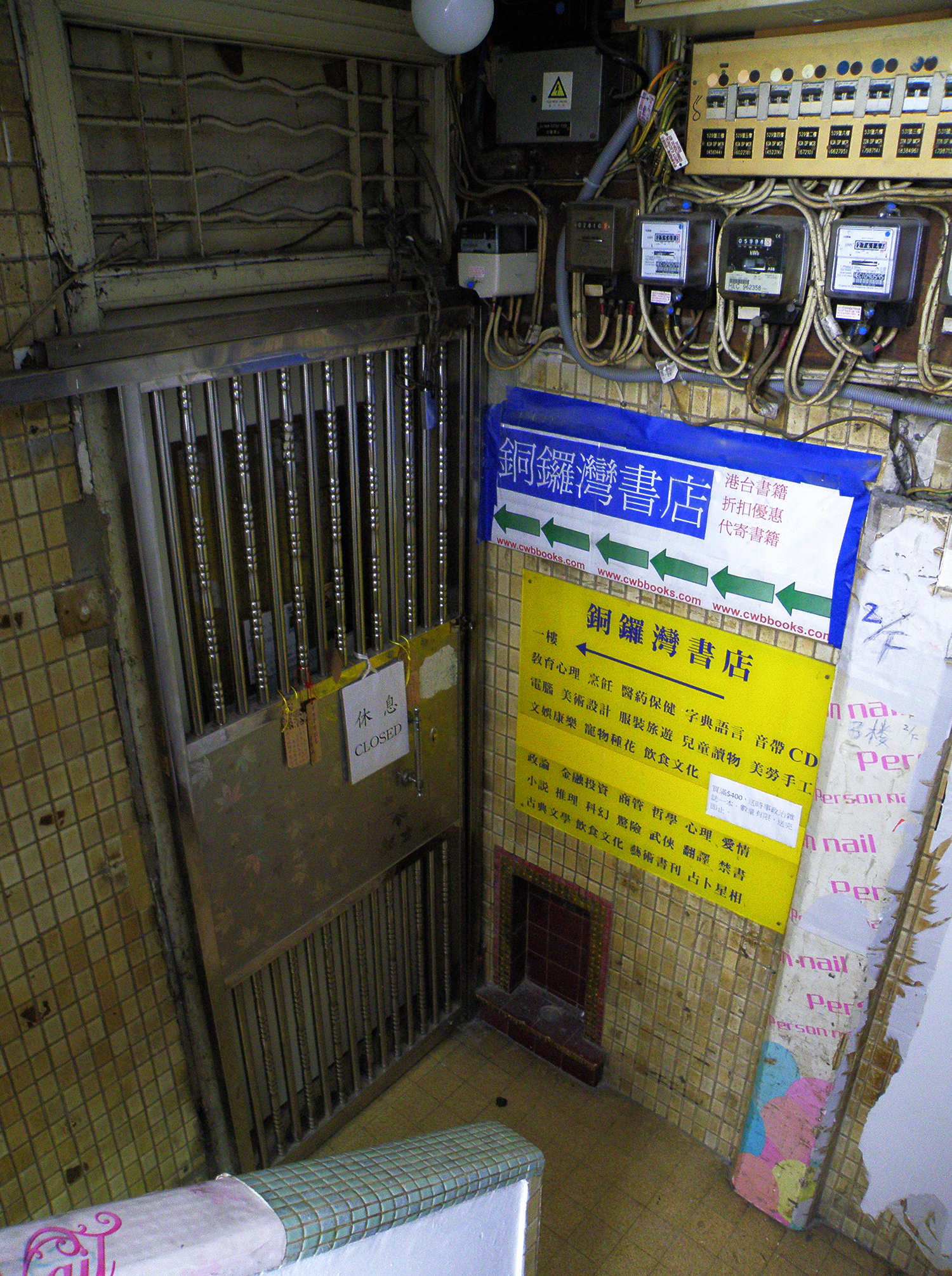
- The entrance of Causeway Bay Books. It has been closed since the disappearance of its fifth staff member, Lee Bo.
- Date: October 2015 – December 2015
- Location: Causeway Bay, Hong Kong

The Causeway Bay Books disappearances are a series of international disappearances concerning five staff members of Causeway Bay Books, a former bookstore located in Causeway Bay, Hong Kong. Between October and December 2015, five staff of Causeway Bay Books went missing. At least two of them disappeared in mainland China, one in Thailand. One member was last seen in Hong Kong, and eventually revealed to be in Shenzhen, across the Chinese border, without the travel documents necessary to have crossed the border through legal channels.

It was widely believed that the booksellers were detained in mainland China, and in February 2016 Guangdong provincial authorities confirmed that all five had been taken into custody in relation to an old traffic case involving one of the detainees, Gui Minhai. While response to the October disappearances had been muted, perhaps in recognition that unexplained disappearances and lengthy extrajudicial detentions are known to occur in mainland China, the unprecedented disappearance of a person in Hong Kong, and the bizarre events surrounding it, shocked the city and crystallised international concern over the possible abduction of Hong Kong citizens by Chinese public security bureau officials and their likely rendition, and the violation of several articles of the Hong Kong Basic Law. In his report to the British government and parliament in early January 2016, foreign secretary Philip Hammond said the incident was "a serious breach of the Sino-British Joint Declaration on Hong Kong and undermines the principle of one country, two systems".

Following the international focus on the disappearances, there were virtual reappearances by two of the missing men, Lee Bo, in the form of letters and photographs, and Gui Minhai, in a confessional video (widely regarded as being a forced confession) broadcast on national television, in which they insisted that their return to mainland China was voluntary but which failed to account for their movement across national borders. These efforts were widely derided by commentators as a farce and a charade, as they failed to satisfy concerns over the breach of "one country, two systems" and its practical and constitutional implications.

On 16 June 2016, shortly after he returned to Hong Kong, Lam Wing-kee gave a long press conference in the presence of legislator Albert Ho in which he detailed the circumstances surrounding his eight-month detention, and describing how his confession and those of his associates had been scripted and stage-managed. Lam indicated the involvement of the Central Investigation Team, which is under direct control of the highest level of the Beijing leadership. His revelations stunned Hong Kong and made headlines worldwide, prompting a flurry of counter-accusations and denials from mainland authorities and supporters.

== Background ==
Causeway Bay Books (銅鑼灣書店), originally located in Causeway Bay, Hong Kong, was founded in 1994 by Lam Wing-kee. It was one of about 110 independent Hong Kong bookshops that rent out space in upstairs locations to avoid high rents at street level. The bookstore sold a number of political books that are considered sensitive and banned in mainland China. Freedom of speech in Hong Kong is protected under Basic Law Article 27, and these independent publishers thrive as they cater predominantly to people interested in the machinations of mainland politics. The bookstore became popular amongst mainland Chinese tourists for this reason. In 2014, the bookstore was sold to Mighty Current Media Company Limited (巨流傳媒有限公司), a publishing house. During the time of the disappearances, the company had three shareholders: Gui Minhai, Sophie Choi and Lui Bo. According to industry sources, Mighty Current is a prolific publisher with a number of publishing subsidiaries, and this group may be responsible for 30 to 60 percent of the output of salacious books about Chinese political figures that are widely available at newsstands and in book stores, including one at Hong Kong International Airport.

Around the time of the disappearances, Gui Minhai was rumoured to have been working on a book regarding current Chinese Communist Party (CCP) general secretary Xi Jinping's personal love history, tentatively named Xi and His Six Women (習近平和他的六個女人). The project was suggested to be linked to the disappearances. The publishing house had also already gone to press with a book entitled 2017: Upheaval in China, but it was withdrawn by the author before publication.

In late 2013, Yiu Man-tin (姚文田), founder and chief editor of Morning Bell Press (晨鐘書局) and a Hong Kong resident, was arrested in Shenzhen after he had been tricked there. He was known to have been preparing to publish a book by a Chinese writer residing in the US about Chinese paramount leader Xi Jinping, entitled Godfather of China, Xi Jinping (中國教父習近平). Yiu was arrested by police in Shenzhen on charges of falsely labelling and smuggling industrial chemicals worth $220,000 in 2010 and was sentenced to prison for 10 years allegedly for smuggling, even though the real reason for the trumped up charges, in the eyes of many, was China's increasing restrictions on political expression under Xi. Two Hong Kong magazine publishers, Wong Kin-man and Wo Chung-hau, were arrested and tried in November 2015 for running an illegal business in China after sending copies of a political magazine to people on the mainland.

Chinese PEN Center director Bei Ling alerted Apple Daily to Lee Bo's disappearance, and the journal reported on 1 January 2016 that Lee had become the fifth member of Causeway Bay Books to disappear. His wife was unwilling to speak to the press at the time, but filed a missing person's report with the Hong Kong police the following day.

=== Guangdong Action Plan ===
According to The Sunday Times, the mainland authorities had issued instructions on 25 April 2015 to eradicate illegal publications and those containing sexual content. The Sunday Times published what was described to be an alleged internal Communist Party document entitled "Guangdong Action Plan", a summary of which had been circulating in journalistic and political circles the previous week, and the full document gives apparent authorisation for excursions by Guangdong enforcers targeting authors, publishers and booksellers. In it, 14 publishing houses and 21 publications in Hong Kong were named.

== Disappearances ==
Lui Bo (呂波, age 55–56) is the manager and one of the three shareholders of Mighty Current. His last known location was the bookstore. On 14 October 2015, he logged in for the last time onto the bookstore computer. Unconfirmed sources state that he was taken away from his wife's home in Shenzhen.

Gui Minhai (桂民海, age 62) is a Swedish national and one of the three shareholders of Mighty Current. He was taken away from his home in Pattaya, Thailand by an unknown man on 17 October 2015. Gui had written some 200 books during his ten years as author/publisher. He kept his movements to himself and his communications routed, and his work projects were also shrouded in secrecy. Gui had not set foot inside the PRC for a long period – he never attended to his father when he was ill, and did not return upon his death. It is known that his home in Thailand was later searched by four Chinese men, who attempted to seize Gui's computer. A manager from the estate where Gui lived, in an effort to contact Gui, dialled the number that last called her regarding Gui, to be told by a taxi driver that the four men, who had left the telephone in the taxi, wanted to go to a border town in Cambodia. He was last heard from on 6 November when he called his wife to tell her that he was safe but was unwilling to reveal his whereabouts. Gui's family contacted the Swedish embassy, and the Swedish police filed a report through Interpol, but the Guardian, noting that the military junta was becoming increasingly accommodating to Chinese demands, observed that the Thais had done little to advance the case. The Thai authorities have no record of him leaving the country. Gui was a board member of Independent Chinese PEN Centre in 2014.

Lam Wing-kee (林榮基, age 70), the founder of Causeway Bay Books, went missing since 24 October 2015. He habitually spent long hours at the bookshop and occasionally slept there. His wife filed a missing persons report with the police on 5 November and his family received a telephone call from him several hours later; he refused to reveal his whereabouts. When filing the police report, they were referred to the Immigration Department, who said it was against privacy policy to reveal a person's records of entry and exit of Hong Kong without the subject's permission. However, legislator James To said this was a reasonable request that was exempt from privacy policy. Police followed up on his case once, asking whether they had heard from him. His family allege that upon learning that he had contacted his family, the officer who called them informed that the case would be closed as resolved.

Cheung Chi-ping (張志平, age 42–43), a manager of Mighty Current, was taken away from his wife's home in Fenggang, Dongguan by at least a dozen men in plainclothes.

Lee Bo (aka Paul Lee, 李波, age 75–76), was a British citizen and the husband of Sophie Choi, who is in turn one of the three shareholders of Mighty Current. Lee regularly helped out in the bookstore. Lee Bo's wife has written a column for 20 years under the pen name of Syu Fei at Ta Kung Pao – owned by the Liaison Office; Lee worked at Joint Publishing until he started work at the bookstore. Since the disappearances of four of his colleagues, he had been doing anonymous interviews with BBC and various media. After the arrest of Yiu Man-tin and the disappearance of three of his colleagues, Lee went on record to say that their motive was purely economic, and that not setting foot in the mainland was the cost to bear for being in the publishing business. Lee was last seen on 30 December 2015, while delivering books in Chai Wan to a certain unknown client. Choi, who had been expecting Lee home for dinner at around 7.15 pm on 30 December, raised the alarm when he failed to return home. Lee had apparently received an order for about ten books from a new customer and had arranged to hand them over in person that night. He descended his building in a lift with at least eight other people at around 6 pm, and witnesses saw him being pushed by a group of men into a minivan, which sped away the moment he was securely on board. Choi, Lee Bo's wife, later received a telephone call from him from a Shenzhen number. Uncharacteristically speaking in Mandarin Chinese and apparently with someone whispering over his shoulder, Lee said that he had to go to the mainland on urgent business and that he would not be back home for some time. He assured her that he was well but assisting with investigations. His wife was told to be discreet. The Immigration Department has no record of Lee having left Hong Kong, and Hong Kong does not have any extradition agreement with the PRC. The fact that his home return permit was left at home led many to fear that he may have somehow been abducted by the mainland public security bureau and renditioned to Shenzhen. His disappearance is the only known disappearance that occurred in Hong Kong territory, and thus sparked even more concern on whether the integrity of "one country, two systems" is being maintained.

== Reactions to Lee Bo's disappearance ==
=== Local ===
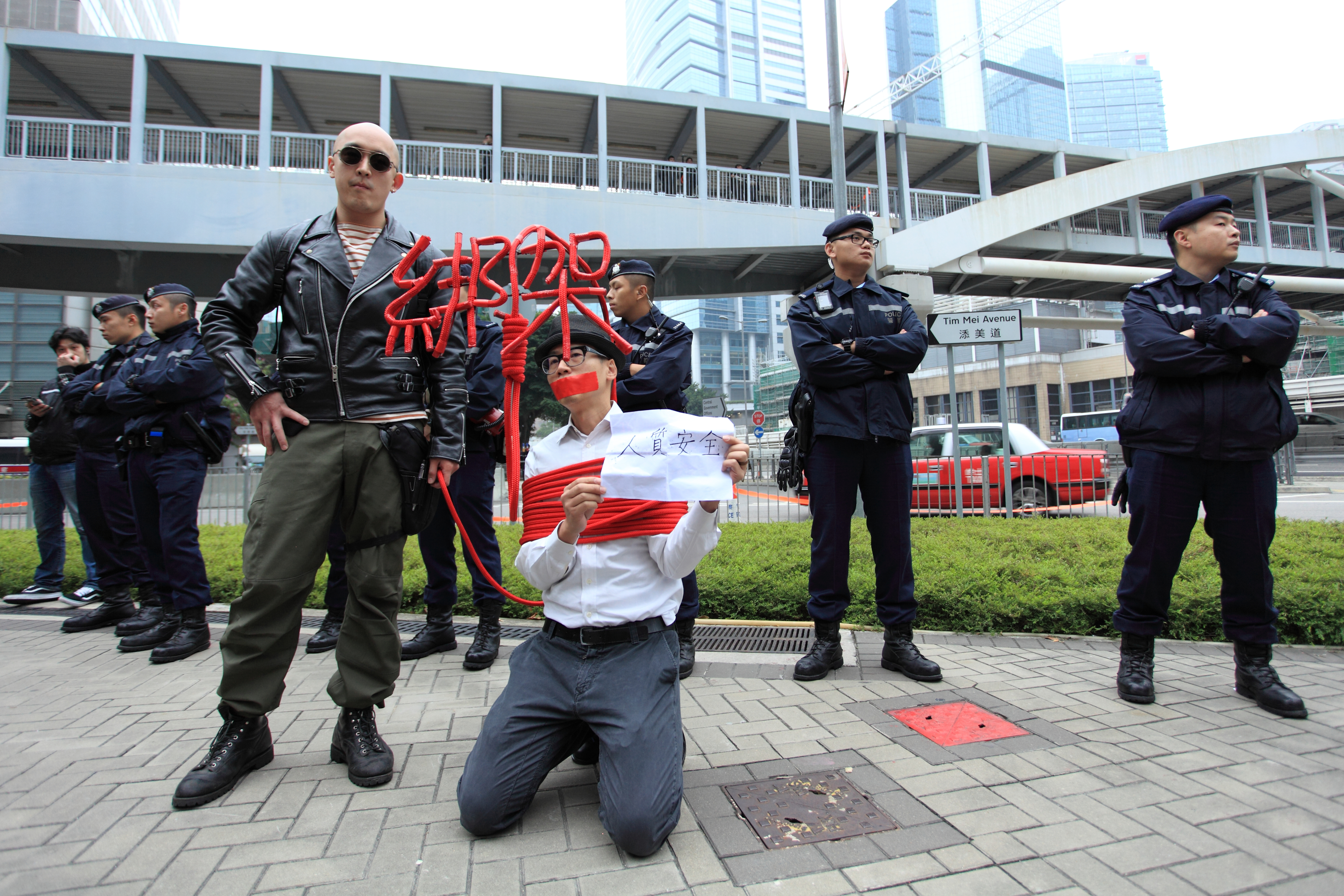
Kacey Wong (with tape over mouth) at the protest against booksellers' disappearances on 10 January. Above the red noose are Chinese characters for "abduction".

Amongst local media outlets, only Apple Daily and Ming Pao ran coverage on their front pages initially, while other local newspapers carried only brief pieces about a missing person. Television viewers remarked that TVB did not run the story during its prime time news programmes for the first few days after news of the Lee Bo disappearance broke. Lee Bo's disappearance spurred renewed interest about Lam Wing-kee, and his family received a police visit the same day after chief executive CY Leung spoke publicly on the case.

Hong Kong's Chief Secretary Carrie Lam said that the Hong Kong government cares about the well-being of its people, and assured the public that police were working on the case. Chief Executive CY Leung stated in a press conference on 4 January 2016 that if mainland Chinese law officials were operating in Hong Kong, it would be "unacceptable" and a breach of the Basic Law. Article 22 states that no department of the central, provincial, or municipal governments within China may interfere in the affairs which the Hong Kong Special Administrative Region administers on its own. Leung furthermore hoped that "anyone, especially Lee Bo himself, can provide relevant information" about his disappearance. In January 2016, after it was revealed that all five men were in mainland China, Lam expressed confidence in the sincerity and goodwill of the PRC government, and said that Lee Bo's disappearance was an isolated case that needed a swift resolution, but it did not amount to a breakdown of one country two systems. The American Chamber of Commerce asserted that with the rule of law, Hong Kong was still a preferable springboard to invest from, compared with Shanghai or Beijing, but nevertheless expressed concern at the disappearances.

Leading pro-establishment figures cast doubt on the mainland's supposed role in the disappearances: Ip Kwok-him said that it was possible to use mainland telephone lines in Hong Kong, so the phone call from a Shenzhen number did not necessarily mean Lee was in the mainland; he added that there was no evidence of abduction. After Lee's wife cancelled her police report, Yiu Si-wing disputed the need for LegCo to discuss his disappearance due to the cancellation; Michael Tien said that if Lee had voluntarily gone to the mainland, it could not be a question of mainland officials acting across the border; Wong Kwok-kin said that kidnappers demand ransoms and not cancellation of missing persons reports. Regina Ip said it was odd that Lee would be able to apparently telephone his wife freely if he was in custody, unlike if he was detained in Hong Kong. Ng Leung-sing, during a legislative council discussion, claimed to have received a tip from "an old friend" that all five booksellers had taken clandestine speedboats to Wai Lingding Island (外伶仃島), an island south of Hong Kong that is administratively part of mainland China with no border facilities, and had been arrested for seeking prostitutes. The allegations of prostitution, criticised by pro-democracy figures as character assassination, were carried by TVB on its prime time evening news as the leading item. Ng later apologised under pressure, saying that he had repeated a rumour without having checked the facts but never mentioned Lee's name. Ng said he was merely trying to state that it was indeed possible to leave Hong Kong without identity documents, and that it was inappropriate to speculate at present. Lee's wife criticised Ng for his insincere apology.

Martin Lee said that "according to all the evidence that has been reported, I believe that Mr. Lee had been taken against his will by certain law enforcement agents from across the border through illegal means". He described the disappearances as the "most worrying thing that has happened in Hong Kong since the handover in 1997". Benny Tai and former chief secretary Anson Chan both said the case poses a genuine threat to the "one country, two systems" principle, which China ought to uphold. Former legislator Margaret Ng suggested that Hong Kong's status as a world city was coming into question, and said "Hong Kong can be deemed to be no longer safe unless we have a clear resolution of the problem". Albert Chan said "this is the first time there has been such a clear violation of Hong Kong's law, a clear violation of 'one country, two systems' principle, that has taken place in such an open manner", and Lee Cheuk-yan, called the disappearances a "milestone for suppression". Joseph Wong, former secretary for the Hong Kong civil service, also said that the incident will have drastic consequences as foreign confidence in the one country two systems policy may be irreparably damaged, which may in turn jeopardise Hong Kong's status as an international financial centre.

On 10 January, in excess of 6,000 people attended a protest march from the Hong Kong government headquarters in Admiralty to the China Liaison Office in Sai Wan demanding Beijing to respect the one country, two systems agreement to preserve Hong Kong's autonomy. Ta Kung Pao announced on the same day that Sophie Choi's regular "Syu Fei" column with the paper was temporarily suspended – a spokesman for the journal said that Choi had advised them just before the new year that she was unable to submit any copy in January. The Hong Kong police said that Lee Bo and his wife had met at a guesthouse in China on Saturday, 23 January. Choi acknowledged he was well and that he was "assisting in an investigation in the capacity of a witness". After the latest revelation, legislator Fernando Cheung criticised the CY Leung administration for limpness, remarking that "up to now the whole handling of the Lee Bo fiasco is being conducted through unofficial means, bypassing the Hong Kong authorities, and Lee Bo seems to be releasing messages under the gun".

=== Authors and other publishers ===
The disappearances led to a very severe crisis of confidence within the publishing sector, with many booksellers being afraid to sell such books on mainland politics or featuring gossip on political figures. As of 7 January 2016, over 500 publishers, writers, booksellers and members of the public had signed an online petition pledging to "not fear the white terror and uphold the principle of publication freedom". Some booksellers began to pull anti-China books off shelves. Singapore-owned Page One removed some of the books published by Mighty Current – in particular many titles focusing on Xi Jinping – from their retail outlet at Hong Kong airport. The head of Open Publishing decided to abort the publication of Xi Jinping's Nightmare, which had already come back from the printers. The author was unable to find a publisher in Hong Kong, and has gone to Taiwan. Richard Charkin, president of the International Publishers Association expressed "deep concern" for the missing men and called for their safe return home. He added that the disappearances "immediately raise dire questions about the Chinese government's commitment to freedom to publish".

On the other hand, US-based writer Xi Nuo (西諾) released his book Xi Jinping and His Lovers that was turned down by Gui Minhai the previous year after he had received a visit from a Chinese government agent. Xi Nuo says his decision to publish the book was to challenge the Chinese authorities. "I want to tell the Chinese authorities and Xi Jinping, the president of China, that you are wrong. Completely wrong. You better release the five guys. Let them go back home". American and European associations of publishers and booksellers – including PEN American Center, the Authors Guild and the Federation of European Publishers – jointly wrote to CY Leung, urging him to take action on the missing Causeway Bay booksellers and "request a formal assurance from Beijing that it will respect Hong Kong's autonomy and abide by the 1984 Sino-British Joint Declaration".

=== National ===
The Chinese Foreign Minister stated that despite Lee Bo's dual Hong Kong and British citizenship, Lee is above all a Chinese citizen. This is viewed as a rebuke to Britain and a characterisation of the disappearance as an internal matter. Wang claimed that there was no evidence that the missing persons were taken by the Chinese government, and urged for an end to "useless speculations." China's Foreign Ministry maintains that China opposes "any foreign country interfering with China's domestic politics or interfering with Hong Kong affairs".

Global Times, a tabloid subsidiary of People's Daily, wrote three successive belligerent editorials on the case, an act viewed by Hong Kong media as an indirect recognition of China's role in the disappearances. The first editorial, on 4 January, opined that the bookshop's business model depended on "stirring up troubles on the mainland ... [and]... that it interferes with mainland affairs in a disguised way, and damages the mainland's vital interests to maintain its harmony and stability." On 6 January 2016, they published another editorial stating that Causeway Bay Books being under investigation by Chinese officials for slander is "reasonable", and also noted that "all powerful agencies in the world have ways to evade the law, so that those under investigation will cooperate".

Mainland law enforcement agencies must notify their Hong Kong counterparts within 14 days under a reciprocal mechanism if any Hong Kong resident is detained across the border, but Hong Kong officials had received no word through these channels at the expiration of the deadline. On 8 January Chinese security officials acknowledged that Lee Bo was being held in China. This took the form of a nine-word message sent to the Hong Kong Police Force with no indication of his whereabouts or his activity status.

=== Interested third countries ===
Speaking anonymously, a senior foreign diplomat in Hong Kong revealed that at least six countries had expressed their concern and asked for information regarding the disappearances as at 23 January 2016. Reuters revealed that fifteen ambassadors or consuls were concerned about the broad interpretation of Chinese nationality, and that the denial of consular access to a Swedish and a British passport holder was a violation of international treaties. Eight countries including the US, UK, Sweden, Canada, Japan, Australia and Germany had privately expressed concerns about the apparent breach of "One country, two systems".

- United Kingdom: As Lee Bo is a dual citizen of both the United Kingdom and Hong Kong, the Foreign and Commonwealth Office expressed "deep concerns" over the disappearances. On 5 January 2016, Foreign Minister Philip Hammond, in a meeting with Chinese Foreign Minister Wang Yi, urged China and Hong Kong to locate the missing persons. Hammond said it was important to "know what has happened and who is responsible for it", and that it would be an "egregious breach of the one country, two systems policy, Hong Kong's Basic Law and the 1984 Sino-British Joint Declaration for someone to be spirited out of Hong Kong in order to face charges in a different jurisdiction". About 50 people protested in front of the Chinese embassy in London on 10 January 2016. In his report on Hong Kong for the second half of 2015, British Foreign Secretary again expressed concern about Lee Bo's case, and called for Lee's immediate return to Hong Kong.
- Sweden: As Gui Minhai is a Swedish national, on 5 January 2016, the Minister for Foreign Affairs stated that they took a "serious view" on Gui's disappearance.
- Taiwan: On 5 January 2016, chairman of Kuomintang and 2016 presidential candidate Eric Chu urged the Hong Kong and Chinese government to give clear answers on the incident. Likewise, on 6 January, fellow presidential candidate and Democratic Progressive Party leader Tsai Ing-wen called for answers and the protection of the freedom of speech in Hong Kong.
- European Union: On 7 January 2016, the European Union European External Action Service issued a statement calling the incident to be "extremely worrying," and urged the governments of China, Hong Kong and Thailand to investigate the disappearances. On 4 February, the European Parliament, while expressing their concern over the missing men, passed a motion calling for the immediate safe release of the booksellers and "all other persons arbitrarily arrested for exercising their rights to freedom of expression and publication in Hong Kong". The parliament also urged the Chinese government "to stop suppressing the free flow of information, including by restricting the use of the internet".
- United States: On 8 January 2016, US State Department spokesman John Kirby said in a regular news briefing that the US government is "disturbed" by the disappearances and "[shares] the concern of the people of Hong Kong regarding these disappearances."

=== Commentators ===
Commentators have noted a resurgent interest from citizens in renewing their BNO passports as they are feeling insecure in having a Hong Kong passport. Legal experts have become increasingly concerned at the reach of Chinese law enforcement. Jerome A. Cohen, expert in Chinese law at New York University, said China's increasing assertiveness in the world represents "not only the extending reach of Chinese law, but the extending reach of Chinese lawlessness." Willy Lam, professor at the Chinese University of Hong Kong, warned: "Not just the publishing and media circles, but the entire Hong Kong society, including people who do business in [mainland] China, and who might have commercial disputes with Chinese companies or different parts of the Chinese government, might fear for their safety because of such a very dangerous precedent". "Freedom from fear is a thing of the past for Hong Kong and this applies to everyone: businessmen or student," said a spokesman for the Hong Kong Human Rights Monitor.

Although alternative options to doing business with China are few for the business sector, many companies large and small, including within the important financial sector, are uneasy about the changing political climate. The head of the one business association in Hong Kong said: "The middle-class, the professionals, even the accountants: people are just freaked out about what is going on... The last bastion of Hong Kong's guarantees is the law. What we have left is our legal system, but people fear that this may be under attack too". Steve Vickers, the principal of one local risk assessment firm said: "The Hong Kong government appears to now have considerably diminished autonomy and the liaison office seems to be strengthening its position, [the disappearances have] certainly sent a chill through the business and social arenas in Hong Kong".

=== Wang Liqiang ===
In November 2019, Wang Liqiang, a Chinese national who claimed to have been a spy, was publicly interviewed by ASPI's strategic analyst Alex Joske on 60 Minutes, and claimed to have aided the kidnapping of Lee Bo. However Lam Wing-kee, a co-owner of the Causeway Bay store and one of the abductees, said he held "some reservations" about Wang's claims and did not recall meeting him. Wing-kee told Hong Kong media that Wang was likely just repeating details of the abduction that he had "heard elsewhere".

== Reappearances ==
=== Gui Minhai ===
Chinese state media published an interview on 17 January where Gui Minhai confessed to causing the death of a student whilst driving under the influence of alcohol in 2005 and for which he supposedly received a two-year suspended sentence. He allegedly absconded before the damages could be settled. According to interviews with China Central Television and Xinhua News Agency, Gui said that he had been consumed with guilt and had returned to China in October to face the consequences of his misdeed.

In the video footage Gui said: "Returning to the Chinese mainland and surrendering was my personal choice and had nothing to do with anyone else. I should shoulder my responsibility and I don't want any individual or institutions to interfere, or viciously hype up my return".

The confession was met with incredulity. Many of the facts surrounding his mysterious disappearance from Thailand, including the release of the video three months afterwards, have been called into question. The president of the Legislative Council of Hong Kong, Jasper Tsang, said: "the China Central Television (CCTV) report [and broadcast of Gui Minghai's confession] did not seem to be able to calm the public. As the case drags on, there will be more speculation". Human Rights Watch was quoted in The Wall Street Journal saying: "Given that Gui has been held nearly three months incommunicado, in a secret location, and without a lawyer, his confession on state-controlled TV lacks credibility."

The Washington Post said: "The narrative seems messy and incoherent, blending possible fact with what seems like outright fiction. It feels illogical, absurd even. But that may be the point. Televised confessions don't tend to trade in logic, or truth. They trade in fear." Following China Central Television's release of videotaped confessions from Gui Minhai – and of Swedish NGO staffer Peter Dahlin – Reporters Without Borders condemned China's "dissemination of forced 'confessions' that have no informational value". The organisation urged the EU to sanction CCTV and Xinhua for "knowingly peddling lies and statements presumably obtained under duress". Hong Kong's chief executive said that he was unable to act as "the Gui Minhai case has not been reported to the Hong Kong police or the government".

The Swedish foreign ministry said an envoy had visited Gui in February, but Swedish diplomats had not been given access to him since.

In October 2017, he was formally released and ended up living in the eastern city of Ningbo, under heavy police surveillance. In January 2018, Gui was travelling to Beijing for a medical exam at the Swedish embassy accompanied by two diplomats from the Swedish Consulate in Shanghai. Before reaching Beijing, 10 men in plain clothes kidnapped him in front of the diplomats. Chinese officials said that he was seized for allegedly sharing secret information with Swedish diplomats and of meeting them illegally. This incident caused Sweden to summon the Chinese ambassador in Stockholm to explain.

In January 2019, Gui's daughter Angela claimed that the Swedish ambassador in Beijing, Anna Lindstedt, invited her to a meeting in Stockholm with several Chinese businessmen at a hotel, at which the businessmen and Lindstedt apparently tried to trade Gui's freedom for Angela's silence on his case. Swedish authorities denied authorising the negotiations. Lindstedt was charged in December 2019, risking 10 years' imprisonment under Swedish law. Later on, her trial in Stockholm District Court started in June 2020.

Gui was awarded, in absentia, the 2019 Kurt Tucholsky prize for persecuted authors. Chinese authorities reacted by cancelling planned visits to Sweden by two large delegations of businessmen.

=== Lee Bo ===
After his wife reported his disappearance to the Hong Kong police, a letter purportedly handwritten by Lee Bo was faxed to Taiwan's Central News Agency on 4 January 2016, explaining that he had "returned to the mainland using my own methods" to work with "concerned parties". Saying that she believed the letter was written voluntarily, Lee Bo's wife withdrew her request for police help. However, the case remains open as Hong Kong police confirmed that a missing person report can only be cancelled by the subject in person.

On 10 January 2016, Headline Daily claimed to have obtained an exclusive video in which Lee Bo claimed that he was safe and that his disappearance was merely a personal trip. It also published a letter, purporting to say that he was "perplexed and puzzled" about the reaction over the disappearances. He also condemned a protest that was to be held on the same day.

Another letter allegedly written by Lee Bo to his wife was sent to Sing Tao Daily on 17 January, the day Gui Minhai's confession was aired, in which Lee denounced his colleague's reprehensible lack of morals in connection with his car accident, and blamed Gui for the fate that had befallen him. In it, Lee also said that he had become good friends with his captors.

On 29 February 2016, Lee Bo met with Hong Kong police and then gave a televised interview on the Hong Kong-based Phoenix Television in an undisclosed location in mainland China, in what was his first public appearance since he went missing. He held to the story that was in the letters published by Sing Tao, saying he "resorted to illegal immigration" to get to the mainland "to cooperate in a judicial investigation" as he did not want to draw attention to his visit. He denied that he was kidnapped, but did not explain how he entered mainland China without his travel documents. Adding that his British citizenship had been sensationalised, Lee Bo says that he will abandon his right of abode in the United Kingdom.

On 24 March, Lee Bo returned to Hong Kong and asked the authorities to drop the case like his three colleagues did before. He said he would never again sell banned books, and was transported back into the mainland in a vehicle with cross-border licence plates the next day.

=== Lui Bo and Cheung Jiping ===
On 4 February 2016, provincial authorities in Guangdong confirmed that Lui Bo, Cheung Jiping, and Lam Wing-kee had been taken into custody in relation to a case involving Gui Minhai. The Guangdong authorities accused them of being "involved in illegal activities on the mainland" saying that "criminal compulsory measures were imposed on them". On 28 February, the three men appeared on Phoenix Television along with Gui Minhai in which they confessed to conspiring with Gui to send banned books to mainland customers and expressed remorse for their "illegal book trading"; Lam, further claiming Gui's books were fabrication, having been compiled from information obtained from the internet and magazines, acknowledged that the books "generated lots of rumours in society and brought a bad influence".

Phoenix TV, citing police sources, said the three men showed "good attitude" by confessing and might be allowed to return to Hong Kong within the week while they await trial. According to the Hong Kong government, Lui Bo had returned to Hong Kong and met with Hong Kong police on the morning of 4 March. He requested that his missing person case be closed and expressed that he does not require assistance from the Hong Kong government and police. Cheung Jiping also came back to Hong Kong two days later, and also asked the Hong Kong police to drop his missing person case. It appears that both men returned to mainland China hours after meeting with the Hong Kong authorities.

=== Lam Wing-kee ===
Lam Wing-kee was the last bookseller with Hong Kong citizenship to be allowed to return to Hong Kong from the mainland, eight months after he disappeared. On 13 June, Lam cancelled his missing person's report with the police, repudiating police assistance. Three days later, on the day he was due to return to the mainland, he held a press briefing in the presence of legislator Albert Ho during which he claimed that he was abducted by the mainland officials at the Hong Kong-China border control in Shenzhen on 24 October 2015. He revealed that he had been transported handcuffed and blindfolded to Ningbo. Lam was not told what offence he had committed until after he was taken to Ningbo, where he was held in solitary confinement and under 24-hour guard by six teams of gaolers from the "Central Investigation Team" (中央專案組) – a Cultural Revolution-era unit whose powers and authority exceed those of the public security bureaus (PSB), reporting to central leadership. Lam felt he had no choice and signed away his rights of access to a lawyer and to inform family members of his detention. During his detention, he was subject to frequent interrogations each lasting around 40 minutes during which he was repeatedly accused of illegally sending banned books to mainland China.

After March 2016, Lam was transferred to Shaoguan, where he worked in a library, but was prevented from leaving the mainland. His release was conditional upon retrieving a hard drive from the bookstore containing lists of readers who had bought books from his business and without divulging any details of his detention. He also stated that his confession on mainland TV in February was scripted, and that Lee Bo, who told him he was "taken away from Hong Kong", had also been forced to make a televised confession.

Lee Bo rejected Lam's assertions the next day, denying that he had told Lam how he ended up in the mainland or that he had handed over the bookstore's list of customers to mainland police. He also claimed that he was assisting Ningbo's PSB during his time there, and had never heard of the Central Investigation Team. Sing Tao Daily published a retort by a case officer in Ningbo, saying that Lam and his girlfriend had signed confessions to having been engaged in "illegal business operations" and agreements not to hire lawyers nor see their families. The officer said Lam was on bail, and was allowed to return to Hong Kong to attend to personal matters.

The Chinese Foreign Ministry said: "Lam Wing-kee is a Chinese citizen, and he has violated China's laws on the mainland... Relevant authorities in China are authorised to handle the case in accordance with the law."

He moved to Taiwan in April 2019. On 20 April 2020, a man threw red paint at him, just days before the reopening of his "Causeway Bay Books" in Taipei.

== See also ==
- Book censorship in China
- Transnational repression by China
- Extraordinary rendition
- List of people who disappeared mysteriously: post-1970
- Case 3/2008 in Macau
