= Lam Wing-kee =

Hong Kong book seller (1955–2026)

- 林榮基
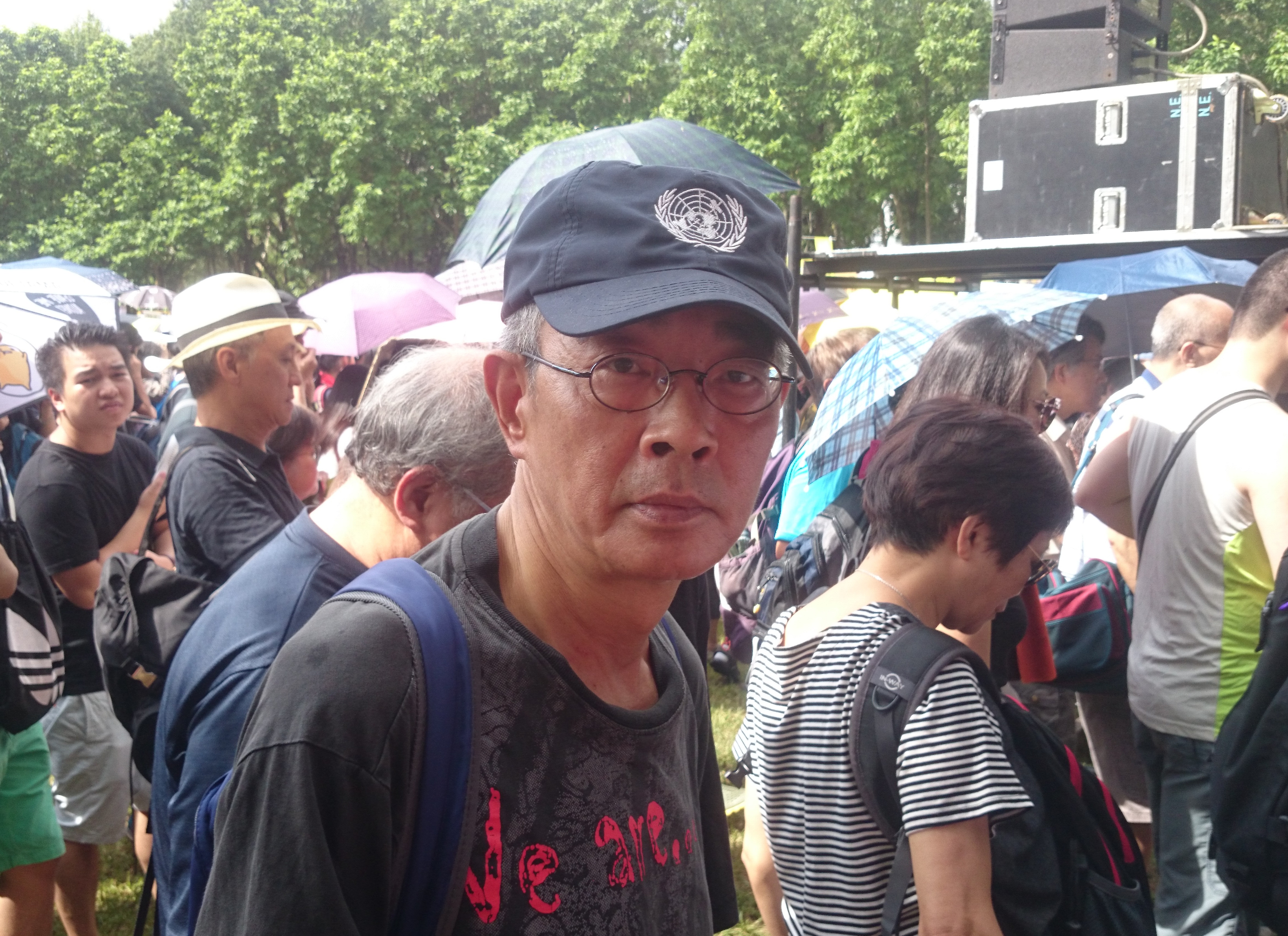
- Lam in 2017
- Born: December 1955; Hong Kong
- Died: 2 July 2026 (aged 70); Taipei, Taiwan
- Occupation: Bookseller

Chinese name
- Traditional Chinese: 林榮基
- Simplified Chinese: 林荣基
Transcriptions
Standard Mandarin
- Hanyu Pinyin: Lín Róngjī
Yue: Cantonese
- Yale Romanization: Lám Wìhng-gēi
- Jyutping: Lam^{4} Wing^{4} gei^{1}
- IPA: [lam˩ wɪŋ˩.kej˥]

Lam Wing-kee (Chinese: 林榮基; Cantonese Yale: Lám Wìhng gēi, December 1955 – 2 July 2026) was a Hong Kong businessman and book seller. He was the owner of Causeway Bay Books in Taipei, a book store first located in Causeway Bay in Hong Kong and best known for its provision of politically related publications. In late 2015, he went missing along with four other staff members of the book store, sparking international concern.

== Disappearance ==
Lam was the founder of Causeway Bay Books. He habitually spent long hours at the bookshop and occasionally slept there. On 24 October 2015, he went missing, as part of the disappearances of several members of the book store. His wife filed a missing persons report with the police on 5 November and his family received a telephone call from him several hours later in which he refused to reveal his whereabouts. Upon learning that he had contacted his family, the police informed them that the case would be closed as resolved.

On 4 February 2016, provincial authorities in Guangdong confirmed that Lam and two other members had been taken into custody in relation to a case involving Gui Minhai, writer and shareholder of Causeway Bay Books. The Guangdong authorities accused them of being "involved in illegal activities on the mainland" saying that "criminal compulsory measures were imposed on them". On 28 February, the three men appeared on Phoenix Television along with Gui Minhai in which they confessed to conspiring with Gui to send banned books to mainland customers and expressed remorse for their "illegal book trading". Lam, further claiming Gui's books were fabrication, having been compiled from information obtained from the internet and magazines, acknowledged that the books "generated lots of rumours in society and brought a bad influence".

Lam was allowed to return to Hong Kong from the mainland, eight months after he disappeared, to fetch information on the customers of the book store. On 13 June, Lam cancelled his missing person's report with the police, repudiating police assistance. Three days later, on the day he was due to return to the mainland, he held a press briefing in the presence of legislator Albert Ho during which he claimed that he was abducted by the mainland officials at the Hong Kong–China border control in Shenzhen in October 2015. He revealed that he had been transported handcuffed and blindfolded to Ningbo. Lam was not told what offence he had committed until after he was taken to Ningbo, where he was held in solitary confinement and under 24-hour guard by six teams of gaolers from the Central Investigation Team. During his detention, he was subject to frequent interrogations each lasting around 40 minutes during which he was repeatedly accused of illegally sending banned books to mainland China. After March 2016, Lam was transferred to Shaoguan, where he worked in a library, but was prevented from leaving the mainland. He also stated that his confession on mainland TV in February was scripted. When asked whether he can see that the government of Hong Kong has protected them, he replied "No".

== Self-exile ==
In April 2019, Lam went into a self-imposed exile in New Taipei City, Taiwan, in response to the proposed Hong Kong extradition bill. He was concerned that he could be extradited to China and would be imprisoned again.

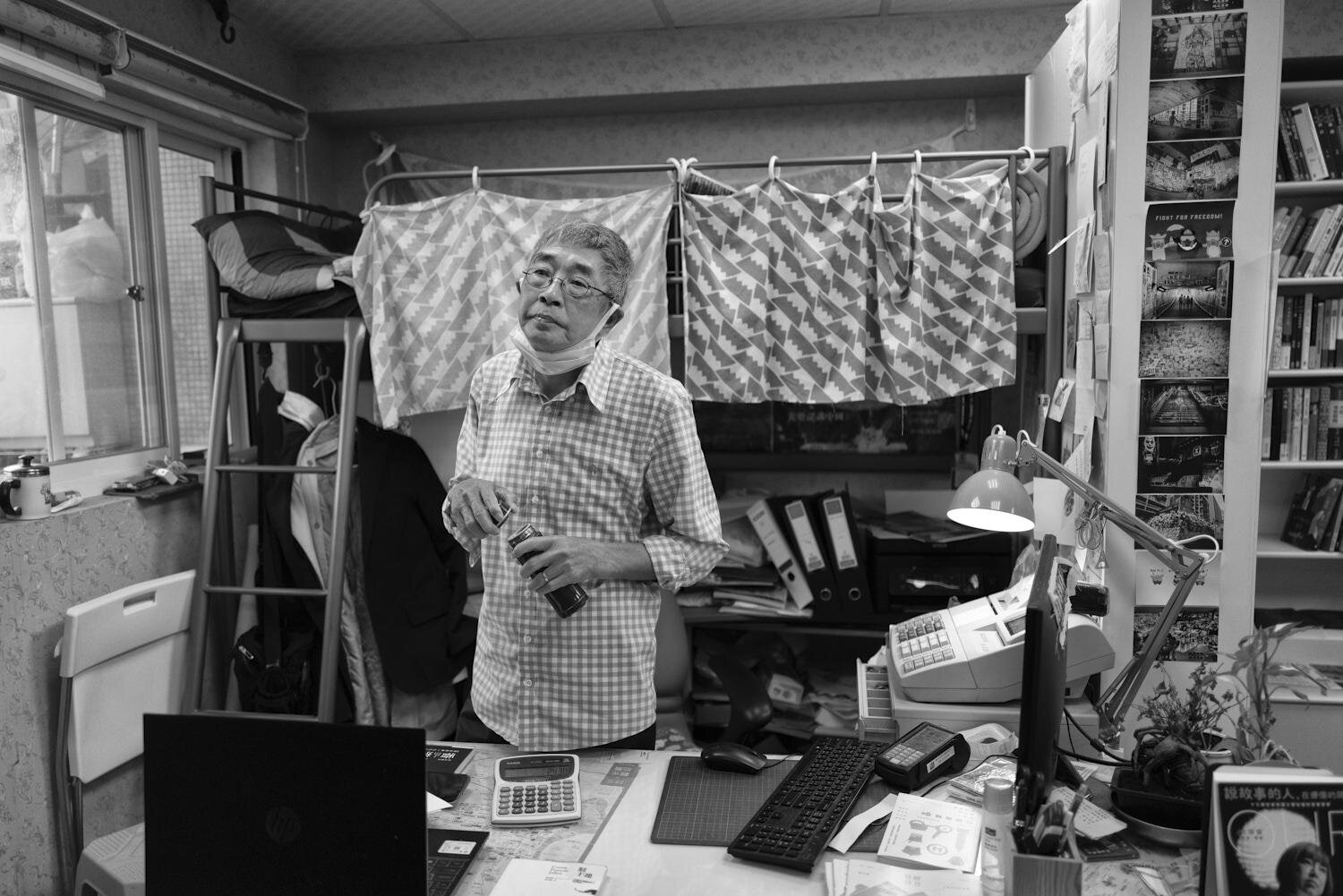
Lam Wing-kee in Taipei in January 2023

A year later, in the face of physical threats and warnings over his choice of name, he opened a small upstairs bookstore in the commercial district of Zhongshan, Taipei. He successfully crowdfunded his operations, raising $100,000 in a single day. On 21 April 2020, days before the reopening of Causeway Bay Books in Taipei, Lam was splashed with red paint and three suspects were arrested the next day. President Tsai Ing-wen sent flowers and a congratulatory note on the day of the Taipei bookshop's opening, and Legislative Yuan speaker You Si-kun and Democratic Progressive Party secretary-general Luo Wen-jia were in attendance. In 2022, it was reported that Lam had applied for permanent residency in Taiwan.

== Political stance ==
His position on Hong Kong independence was ambiguous. In an interview by Canadian media, he said:

"Freedom is not all-powerful, freedom is always relative. You have the freedom of expression of course, but there is also a restriction. For instance, you like to sing at night while the neighbor is sleeping causing disturbance, then has your freedom affected others? ("自由不是萬能，自由永遠是相對。當然你有表達的自由，但都是有規限，譬如夜晚你喜歡唱歌，隔壁人家睡覺，你吵到人家，如此你的自由是否影響到人家呢？") "

Regarding the Russian invasion of Ukraine, Lam Wing-kee also argued that Russians will not see any ideological changes due to the final results of the war, even if Vladimir Putin loses power because another or more Russian dictators will come. He supported Ukrainian accession to the EU and to NATO.

== Death ==
Lam died at a hospital in Taipei, on 2 July 2026, after suffering from lung cancer for years. He was 70.

== See also ==
- List of solved missing person cases (post-2000)
