= Public Security Forces of Macao =

Public security body for Macau

Chinese name
- Traditional Chinese: 澳門保安部隊
- Simplified Chinese: 澳门保安部队
Transcriptions

Portuguese name
- Portuguese: Forças de Segurança de Macau

The Public Security Forces of Macao (Chinese: 澳門保安部隊, Portuguese: Forças de Segurança de Macau) (FSM) is Macau's public security body under the Secretariat for Security, responsible for handling government activities ranging from law enforcement to public safety.

== History ==
In 1975, the FSM was created to take the place of the Macau Independent Territorial Command, which was in charge of Portuguese military forces involved in the colony's national security. Portuguese military involvement ended in 1995 and was replaced by Macanese officers recruited to the FSM.

On December 20, 1999, the various police force branches of Macau (Security Forces of Macau and Judiciary Police), under the jurisdiction of Security and Justice departments (except the customs police, who were reassigned to the Financial Service Department) were assigned to the FSM, under the supervision of the secretary of security (security department). At the time of the handover of Macau to the People's Republic of China, plans were in place to modernize the police force with the goal of better positioning the force to combat organized crime and to stop illegal immigration.

On October 15, 2019, the FSM's Discipline Supervision Committee was given the power to investigate complaints made towards anyone working under the FSM.

In the midst of the 2021 COVID-19 pandemic, Macao saw a 26.1% increase in overall crime, with the number of cyber-fraud cases increasing by almost 50%. As a result, it was announced that the FSM will continue to improve their "smart policing" and work more closely with security forces in nearby regions.

== Structure ==
The FSM has the following organizations under its command:

- Public Security Forces Affairs Bureau (DSFSM)
- Unitary Police Service (SPU)
  - Public Security Police Force of Macau (PSP)
  - Judiciary Police (PJ)
- Correctional Services Bureau (DSC)
- Fire Services Bureau (CB)
- Macau Customs Service
- Academy of Public Security Forces

== See also ==
- People's Liberation Army Macau Garrison
