= Secretary for Public Security =

The Secretary for Public Security was the top position for a law enforcement officer in Portuguese Macau.

== Organization ==
The Secretary headed the Secretariat for Public Security branch, which as responsible for the disciplinary services in Macau. The department's name had a slight change in 1999 to be referred to as the Secretariat for Security.

- Macau Security Force
  - Public Security Police Force
  - Public Security Forces Affairs Bureau
  - Judiciary Police
  - Unitary Police Service
  - Macau Prisons
- Fire Services Bureau
- Academy for Public Security Forces
- Customs of Macau SAR

== List of Secretariats ==
- Jorge Noronha e Silveira 1996–1999 as Deputy Secretary for Justice Affairs of Macau; law professor and now Deputy Ombudsman of Justice
- Manuel Morge - pre-1999

Other key officials include:

- Cheong Kuoc Vá - Chief of the Public Security Police Force
