= Case 3/2008 in Macau =

Habeas corpus case

- Court: Court of Final Appeal (Macau)
- Decided: February 12, 2008
- Citation: Processo n.º 3/2008
- Transcript: Judgment in Portuguese Chinese translation

Case history
- Related action: Case 12/2007 in Macau

Court membership
- Judges sitting: Viriato Manuel Pinheiro de Lima, João Augusto Gonçalves Gil de Oliveira, Jorge Miguel Pinto de Seabra

Case opinions
- Extraditing fugitives is subject to the provision of special law, but there was no such law for extradition to Mainland China.
- Decision by: Viriato Manuel Pinheiro de Lima
- Concurrence: João Augusto Gonçalves Gil de Oliveira, Jorge Miguel Pinto de Seabra

Keywords
- Habeas corpus; Extradition; Supervening impossibility; Judicial cooperation in criminal matters with Mainland China

Case 3/2008 in Macau was a habeas corpus case heard before the Macau Tribunal of Ultimate Instance. The applicant A (Note: The individuals involved were anonymised, and this article shall use the same symbols as in the judgment to denote them.) filed a request of habeas corpus to the court, as he believed his elder sister B was in unlawful detention by the Judiciary Police in Macau, when in fact B had been transferred to the Public Security Bureau of Zhuhai, China, one day before the request. The court has no jurisdiction outside Macau, so it ruled that there was no further need to adjudicate, on grounds of supervening impossibility of the remedy sought. The judgment, however, went on to cite a previous decision by the same court in 2007, which allowed a similar application. The court this time reiterated that before specific legislation is introduced, it is illegal to transfer fugitives to mainland China, and the acts by the authority in the present case "discredit justice, undermine the Rechtsstaat and do not bring prestige to the Macau Special Administrative Region." The case has since been cited by jurists in academic papers concerning the lack of extradition legislation between Macau and mainland China.

After the Hong Kong Causeway Bay Books disappearances in 2015, a report in February 2016 by South China Morning Post recalled this case. The day after, Secretary for Security Wong Sio Chak, who was the head of Judiciary Police in 2008, emphasised that the extradition had followed the law, and the criticism by the court was due to different interpretation of the law.

== Background ==
A Hong Kong permanent resident B of Chinese nationality arrived at Outer Harbour Ferry Terminal in Macau on the afternoon of 6 February 2008. She was then held by Migration Service personnel of the Public Security Police. Since she was the suspect of a credit card fraud case in Fuzhou, China, the Interpol had issued a Red Notice, which included the request that after her arrest, she be transferred to mainland China. The Public Security Police therefore handed her to the Macau Judiciary Police. On the same day, an Assistant Procurator General gave the order to transfer B to the Public Security Bureau of Zhuhai. This was carried out on 7 February.

== The applicant's reason ==
On 8 February, B's younger brother, A, sent a habeas corpus request by fax to the Tribunal of Ultimate Instance. In his application, A said, B's family members had visited the Judiciary Police branch at Rua Central on 7 February evening. They asked B's whereabouts, only to be told that B was not there. A thought that, had B been released, then she would have been in touch with her family, but that was not the case. After the 48 hours time limit for detention (Note: See "Código de Processo Penal Artico 237.º" (in Portuguese).) had elapsed, A said he was still oblivious to B's situation, and thus believed that she was illegally detained. This was the reason he filed the case. (Note: See "Código de Processo Penal Artico 204.º" (in Portuguese).)

== The respondent ==
The Public Ministry (or Public Prosecutor's Office) was listed as the respondent in the case. After receiving the habeas corpus request, the court notified Wong Sio Chak, who then was the Director of the Macau Judiciary Police, to submit an explanation. In the official letter to the court, he explained, if an Interpol member state found an individual wanted in a Red Notice, then according to Interpol regulations, they must immediately notify the National Central Bureau and the Interpol General Secretariat, and so they did. Having communicated with the Chinese National Central Bureau, they knew that the Public Security Bureau in Fuzhou had issued an arrest warrant on 4 June 2004 and demanded that, once B was arrested, she be sent to mainland China, and the extradition that had happened was justified by the order of an Assistant Procurator General.

== Decision ==
The court held a public hearing as the Code of Penal Procedures (Note: For the relevant procedures, see"Código de Processo Penal Artico 205.º" (in Portuguese).) prescribed. In the first part of the analysis, the court confirmed that before the habeas corpus petition, B had already been transferred to mainland China, where the court in Macau has no jurisdiction. The court had no remedy available to hand down, or in other words, supervenient impossibility appeared and the court ruled to terminate the proceedings.

However, the judgment went on to cite Case 12/2007 in Macau, in which the same court had decided that extraditing fugitives to a place other than Macau requires special provision of the law, but the law at that time had no such provision governing the transfer to mainland China. The conclusion was that, even with a Red Notice from the Interpol, neither the Public Ministry nor the Judiciary Police might detain the person for extradition purposes.

The court acknowledged that there were probably voices objecting them, but prior to the judgment, the objections they had seen were "mere slogans without substantive content", and even if there were diverging opinions, court decisions within their jurisdiction shall prevail over all other authorities (Note: See "Lei de Bases da Organização Judiciária" (in Portuguese) Artigo 8.º) in a territory governed by law. Regarding judicial action notifications and producing evidence on civil and commercial matters, the cooperation between Macau and mainland China had required a set of agreement, (Note: See "Acordo sobre os Pedidos Mútuos de Citação ou Notificação de Actos Judiciais e de Produção de Provas em Matéria Civil e Comercial entre os Tribunais do Interior da China e os da Região Administrativa Especial de Macau" (in Portuguese).) and hence it should be more so for extraditing fugitives, or otherwise its legality cannot be guaranteed, considering that the two kinds of matters are incomparable in their aggressiveness to the fundamental personal rights.

Therefore, the court reprimanded, saying that despite the decision in 2007,

it persists in making such extraditions, without the provision of law or agreement, without organised process, without the possibility for the detainee to defend, and without the order from a judge for that.

These acts discredit justice, undermine the state of law and do not bring prestige to the Macau Special Administrative Region.

== Response ==
In 2009, a Macau University of Science and Technology law professor Fang Quan agreed with parts of the criticism in the judgment, that the government failed to comply with the 2007 decision, whereby the doctrine of res judicata and persuasiveness of judicial decisions were harmed, damaging the judicial authority. Meanwhile, she said the court's stance was "self-contradictory": according to the Código de Processo Penal, (Note: See "Código de Processo Penal Artigo 208.º" (in Portuguese).) if an official does not comply with the court's decision on the imprisoned person in response to his habeas corpus request, then that official is punishable with the penalty equivalent to that for misfeasance ("prevarication"). (Note: See "Código Penal Artigo 333.º" (in Portuguese).) However, on one hand the court condemned the non-compliance, but on the other hand, it made no further action to hold the Assistant Procurator General responsible. She also identified that the detention should be the sole matter of dispute of a habeas corpus case, not the extradition, but the court had "bound and confounded" the two issues. They relied on the reasoning that "since the extradition is illegal, the same must hold for the detention", while neither is the necessary condition of the other. The Macau branch of Interpol in certain circumstances has the authority (Note: See "Regulamento Administrativo n.º 9/2006 Organização e funcionamento da Polícia Judiciária Artigo 21.º" (in Portuguese).) to detain individuals sought by foreign authorities, and to present the person to a competent magistrate, so in this way it is possible to detain a fugitive (subject to the criminal procedural law), and "there should not be any question to its legality".

In 2013, another law Professor, Zhao Guoqiang from the University of Macau, commented that this case, together with the 2007 case, reflected the practical disagreement between the prosecution office and the court, on how extraditions should be handled, and this needed to be resolved. Zhao also explicitly supported the prosecution office's opinion, and questioned the court's reasons. He thought that the court's decision was based on incorrect ideas, and however good faith the decision might come with subjectively, the connivance of criminals was its objective consequence, "Is it really what Macau wants, the 'prestige' of being the heaven for criminals?" Instead, he opined, "without any agreement or specific law, but following the 'One country, two systems' policy, and the principle of 'reciprocal benefit'", it should be possible to extradite fugitives, but of course it is still preferable to have a proper agreement as soon as possible. It was the court that with its incorrect understanding of extradition practices, and by "specious" reasons, "abruptly intervened the tacit agreement and tradition" of extradition between Macau and mainland China. In a previous paper, Zhao wrote that the court's ideal of "extradition according to law" still "makes some sense", and it was only the lack of progress in resolving the extradition dilemma that disappointed him, and extradition has surprisingly become more difficult after the handover of Macau to China.

After the Hong Kong Causeway Bay Books disappearances in 2015, the South China Morning Post published an article in February 2016 which described this case and the deportation of Wu Quanshen in 2015 as "extrajudicial". When Joaquim Jorge Neto Valente, President of the Association of Advocates in Macau (counterpart of the Bar association), was interviewed, he commented that no matter how many or few such cases there were, "the principle is wrong". Several news media in Hong Kong and Macau quoted the SCMP report. An op-ed on the news page Macau Concealers wrote that it was the SCMP report that brought the case back to people's attention after so many years. One day after the report, Wong Sio Chak, having been promoted to the Secretary for Security of Macau, chaired the press conference on the 2015 crime figures. There, he mentioned that the extradition was according to law and that the court's criticism was due to their different interpretation of the law. Also, he clarified that to avoid further conflicts between the prosecution office and the court, the government no longer handled similar cases, and Macau had not extradited any Hong Konger to mainland China from 2008. He pointed out that no law forbade the extradition of Hong Kong citizens, and emphasised that they would handle cases in the "one country, two systems" way, that Macau residents were "absolutely, hundred percent, never" involved, and that in general principles it was absolutely not allowed to extradite Macau residents.

In 2019, another two Assistant Professors from the University of Macau, Miguel Manero de Lemos and Teresa Lancry Robalo, wrote that the conflict between the two judicial institutions of Macau was instructive. The court upheld the rule of law and procedural justice, but in doing so made it possible for Macau to surrender fugitives to everywhere in the world, (Note: A relevant law is "Lei n.º 6/2006 "Lei da cooperação judiciária em matéria penal"" (in Portuguese), but it only regulates "judicial cooperation in criminal matters with states or territories outside the People's Republic of China.") but impossible to mainland China and Hong Kong. In contrast, the prosecution office considered it important to co-operate to fight crime, and gave "possibly, a prevalence of politics over law", and in consequence whether to extradite a person would be determined by the prosecution or police authorities without procedural protections. Both sides lead to consequences which are "hard to stomach". Right before the paper was published, the 2019 Hong Kong extradition bill was proposed to the Legislative Council of Hong Kong, which de Lemos and Robalo thought might be a key step to cooperation on transferring fugitives within the “one country”.

Macau social activist Jason Chao also commented on this case during the 2019–2020 Hong Kong protests against the bill mentioned above. He considered that the Macau government (in handling extradition cases) "sought ways to circumvent potential legal challenges" after the 2007 ruling.
