= Hong Kong–Zhuhai–Macao Bridge Zhuhai–Macao Port =

Port in Macao

Hong Kong–Zhuhai–Macao Bridge Zhuhai Port
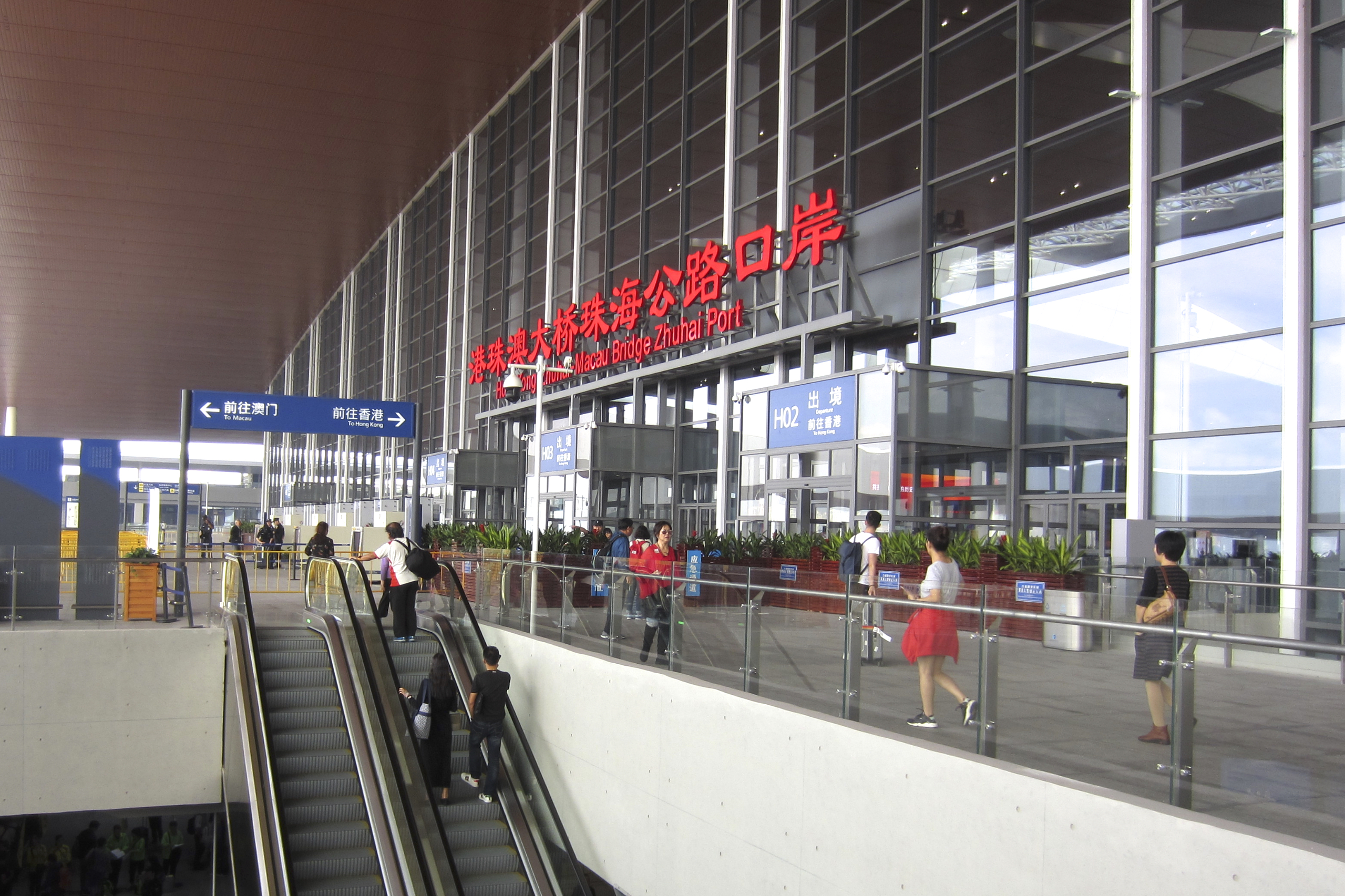
- Interior of the Zhuhai Port building (mainland China side)

Location
- Country: China
- Location: Zhuhai–Macau Port Artificial Island, Gongbei, Zhuhai, Guangdong
- Coordinates: 22.2084°N 113.5764°E

Details
- Opened: October 24, 2018; 7 years ago
- Operated by: National Immigration Administration; General Administration of Customs (China)
- Owned by: Government of the People's Republic of China

Statistics
- Passenger traffic: 14 million (2023)

Website
- Zhuhai Public Security Bureau

Hong Kong–Zhuhai–Macao Bridge Macau Port
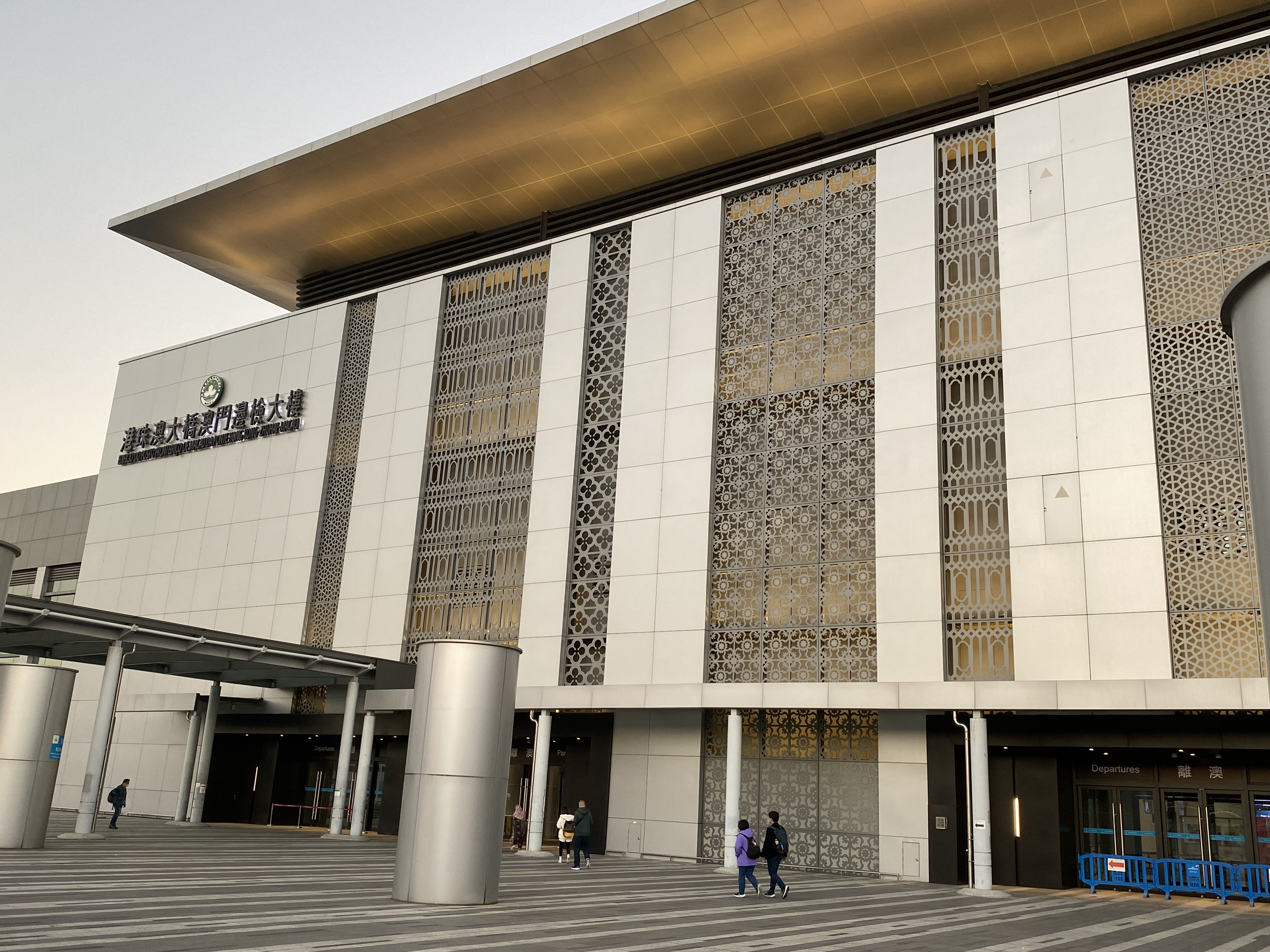
- Macau Port building at the HZMB, located on the artificial island

Location
- Country: Macau SAR
- Location: Zhuhai–Macau Port Artificial Island (Macau jurisdiction)
- Coordinates: 22.2054°N 113.5764°E

Details
- Opened: October 24, 2018; 7 years ago
- Operated by: Public Security Police Force of Macau; Macau Customs Service
- Owned by: Government of the Macau Special Administrative Region

Statistics
- Passenger traffic: 12 million (2023)

Website
- Public Security Police – Macau

The Hong Kong–Zhuhai–Macao Bridge Zhuhai–Macao Port (Chinese: 港珠澳大橋珠澳口岸) is a large-scale border control complex located at the western end of the Hong Kong–Zhuhai–Macau Bridge (HZMB). It is situated on an artificial island in the Pearl River Delta, between Gongbei, Zhuhai and Macau. The facility consists of two independent immigration and customs checkpoints: the Zhuhai Port, operated by mainland Chinese authorities, and the Macau Port, operated under the jurisdiction of the Macau Special Administrative Region.

The port officially opened on 24 October 2018, the same day as the bridge's full operation. It provides 24-hour passenger and vehicle clearance, forming the western terminus of the 55 km bridge and serving as a key node in the Greater Bay Area transportation network.

Each side of the port maintains independent legal systems, customs controls, and inspection areas, but both are located on the same island. The boundary between the Zhuhai and Macau jurisdictions is clearly demarcated on the island and managed cooperatively.

== History ==
The Hong Kong–Zhuhai–Macau Bridge (HZMB), spanning 55 km across the Pearl River Estuary, commenced construction in December 2009 and was structurally completed on 6 February 2018.

Simultaneously, reclamation for the Zhuhai–Macau Port artificial island was finished in November 2013, providing the foundation for the two-border checkpoints.

On 23 October 2018, General Secretary of the Chinese Communist Party Xi Jinping officially inaugurated the HZMB, including the three-port system. The port complex began public operations at 09:00 on 24 October 2018.

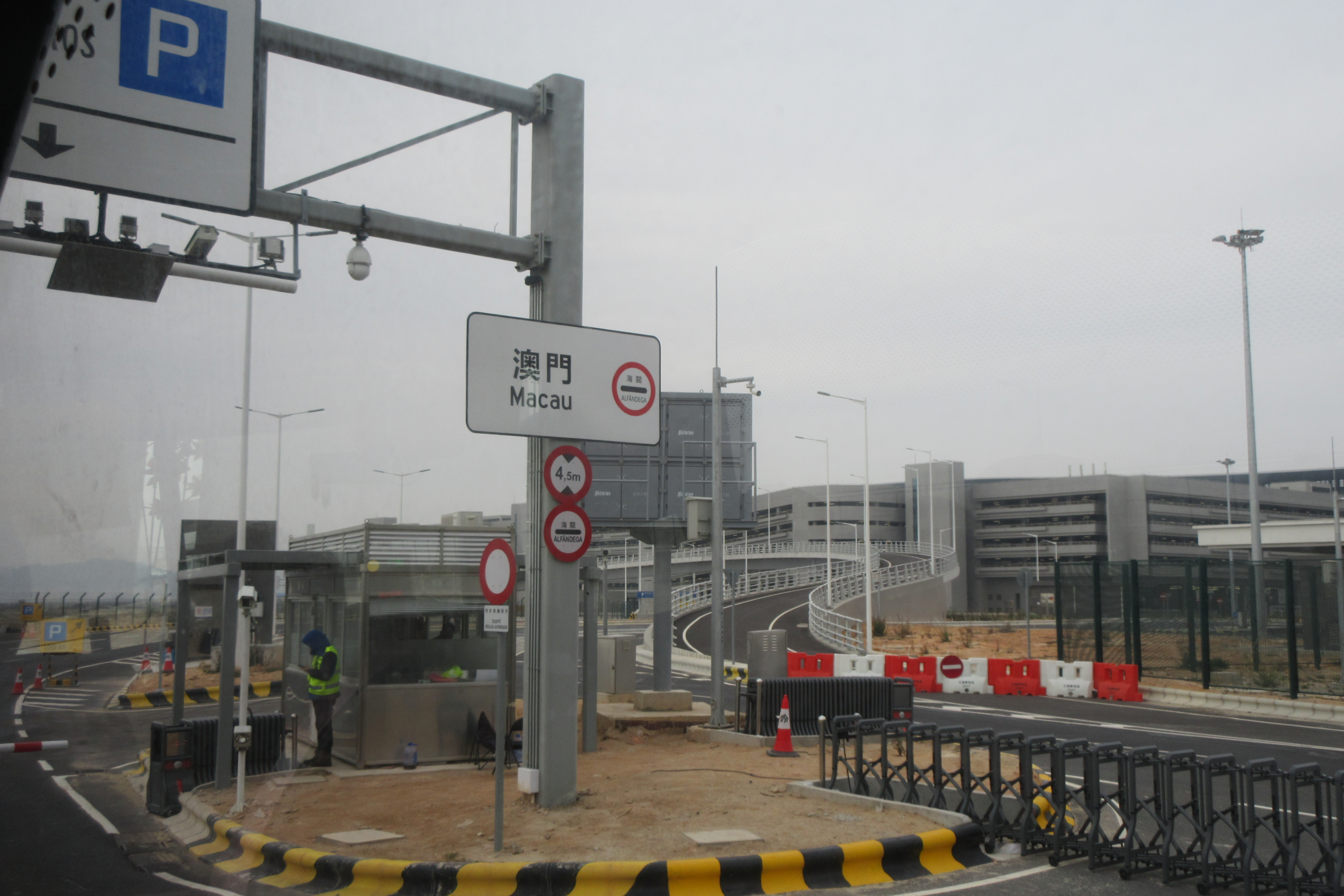
Border line on the artificial island between Zhuhai (left) and Macau (right), as seen from the bridge

== Facilities ==
The Zhuhai–Macao Port is located on an artificial island constructed through large-scale land reclamation in the Pearl River Estuary. The island spans approximately 1 square kilometre, and is divided into two zones:

- the northern section, administered by Zhuhai under mainland China's jurisdiction, and
- the southern section, under the jurisdiction of the Macao Special Administrative Region.

Although physically adjacent, the two ports operate independently with distinct customs and immigration systems, in accordance with the "One Country, Two Systems" principle.

=== Zhuhai Port ===
Zhuhai Port handles both vehicle and passenger clearance through dedicated halls and automated systems. A streamlined "one-stop" inspection model is used for cross-boundary vehicles.

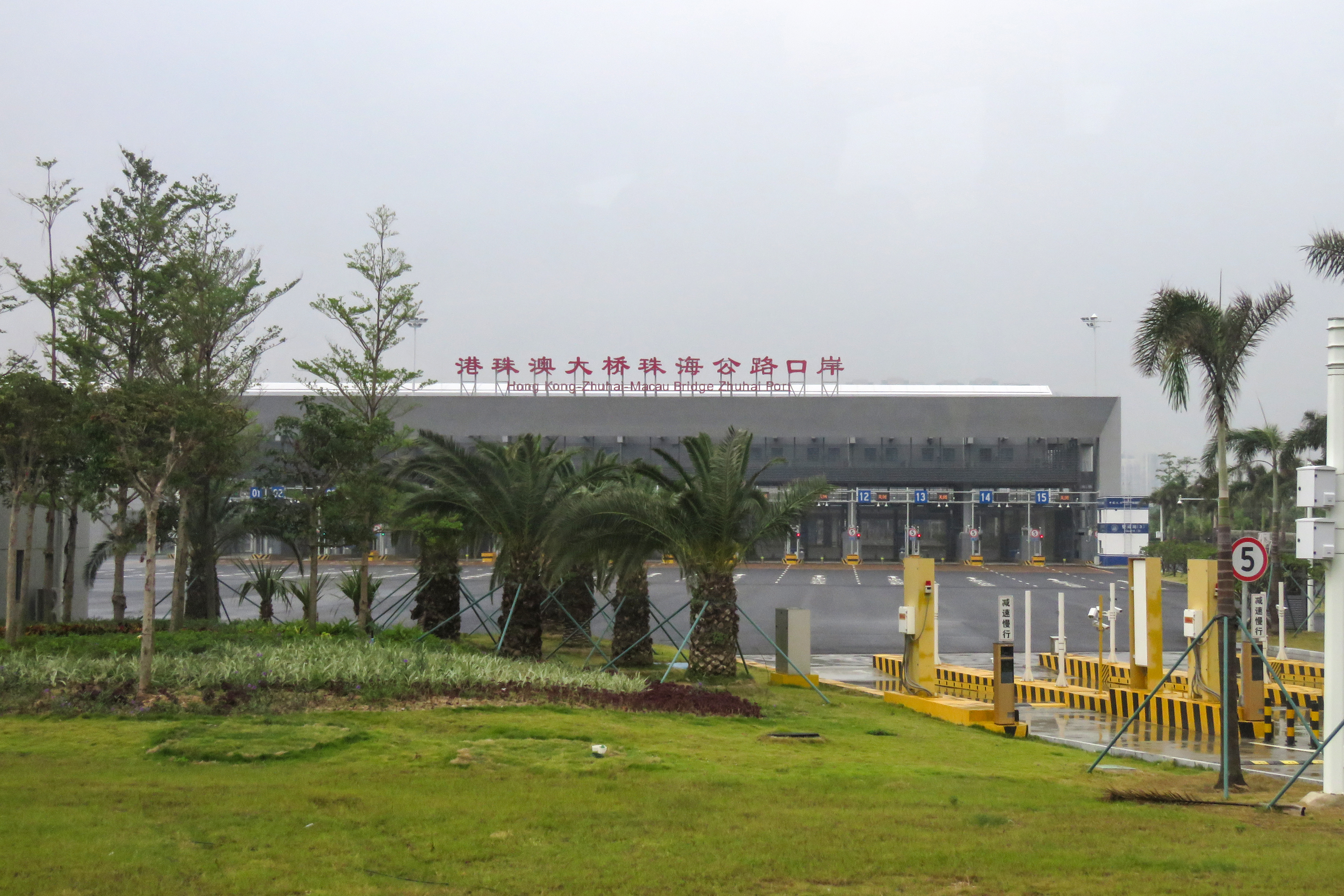
Vehicle clearance zone at Zhuhai Port, equipped with automated inspection lanes and customs booths.

=== Macau Port ===
Macau Port is equipped with customs, immigration, and transport interchanges, including the coach terminals. The port is a 24-hour facility serving both local and cross-border travellers.

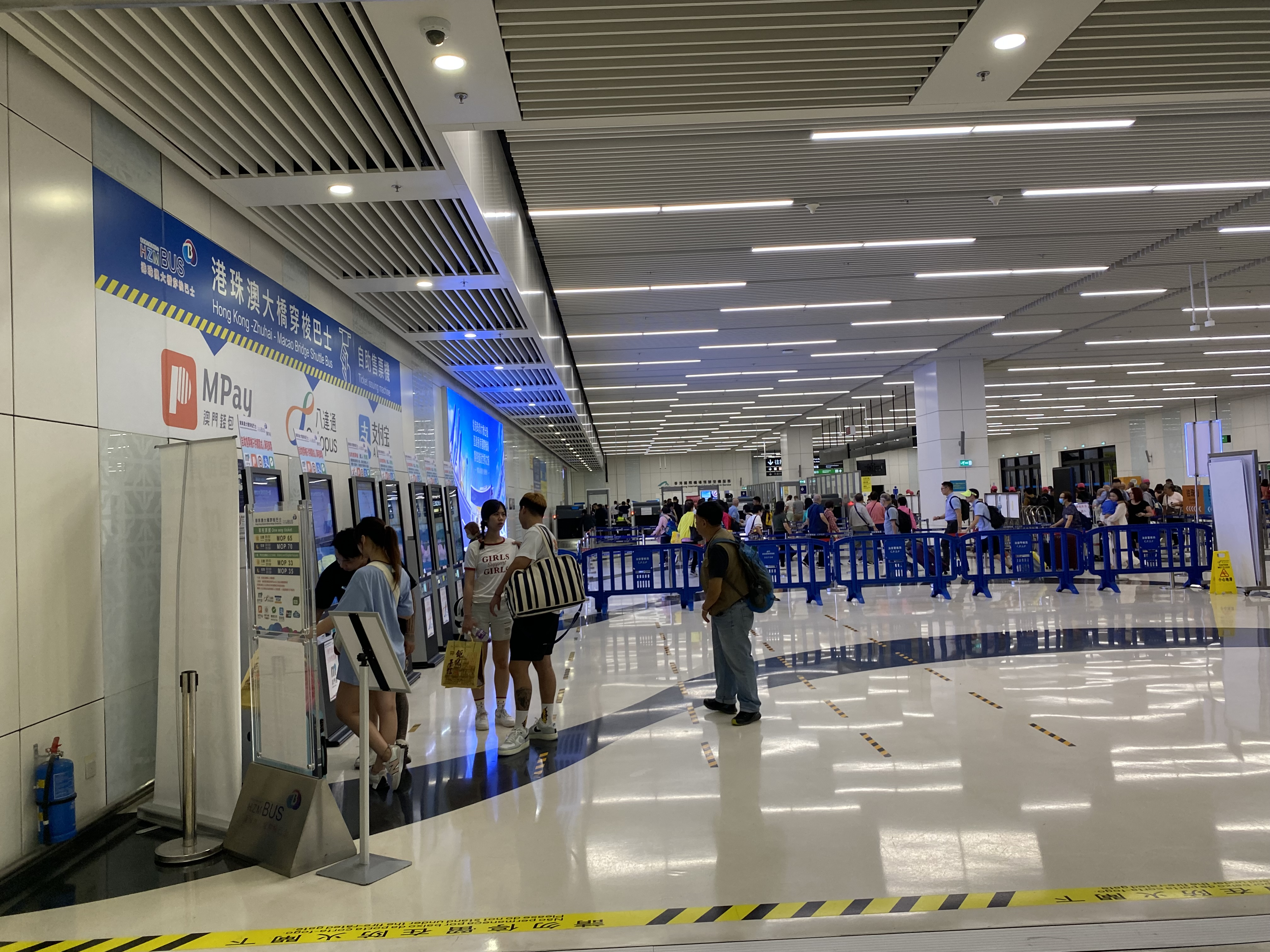
Shuttle bus ticketing kiosk at the Macau Port departure concourse.

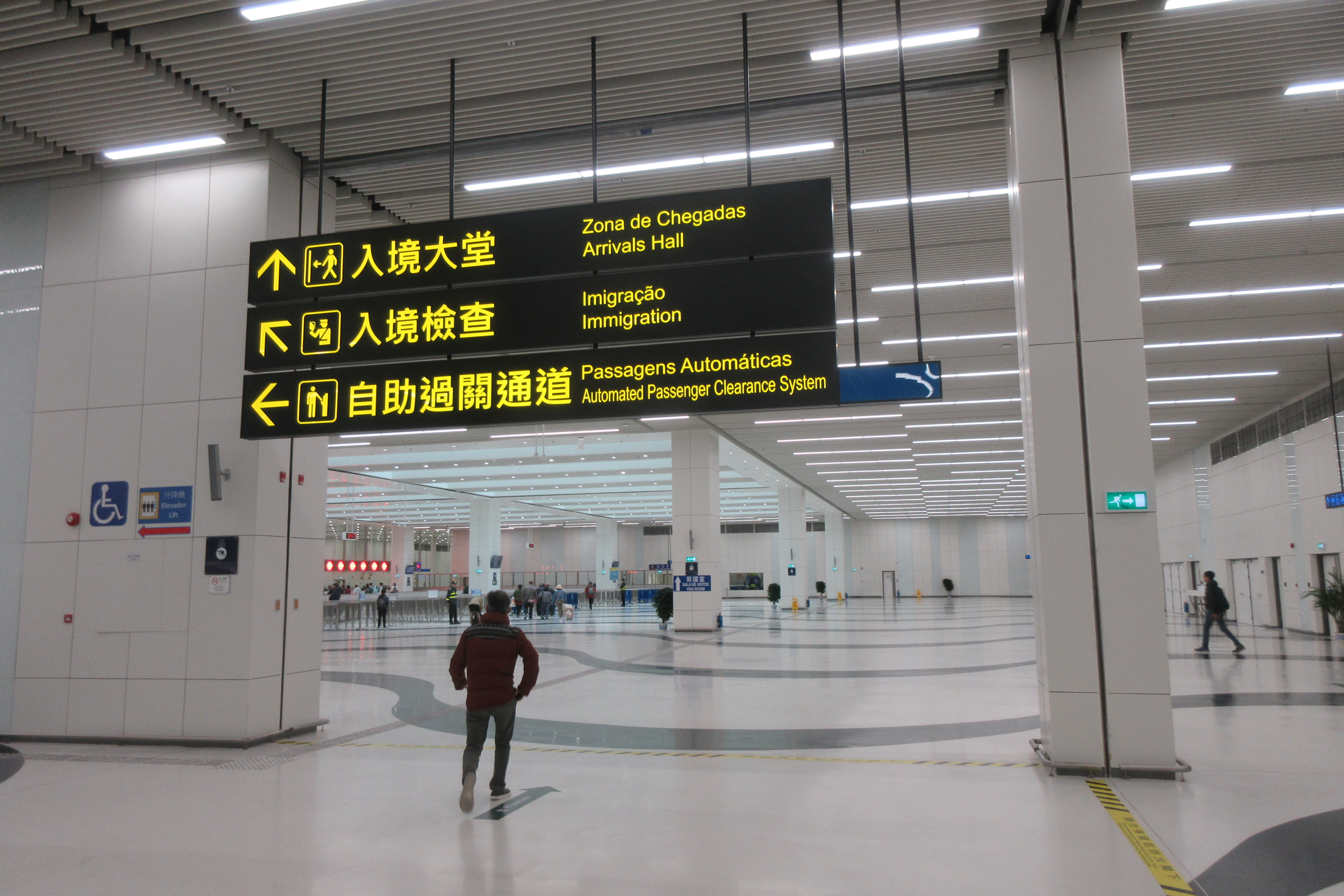
Arrival hall at Macau Port.

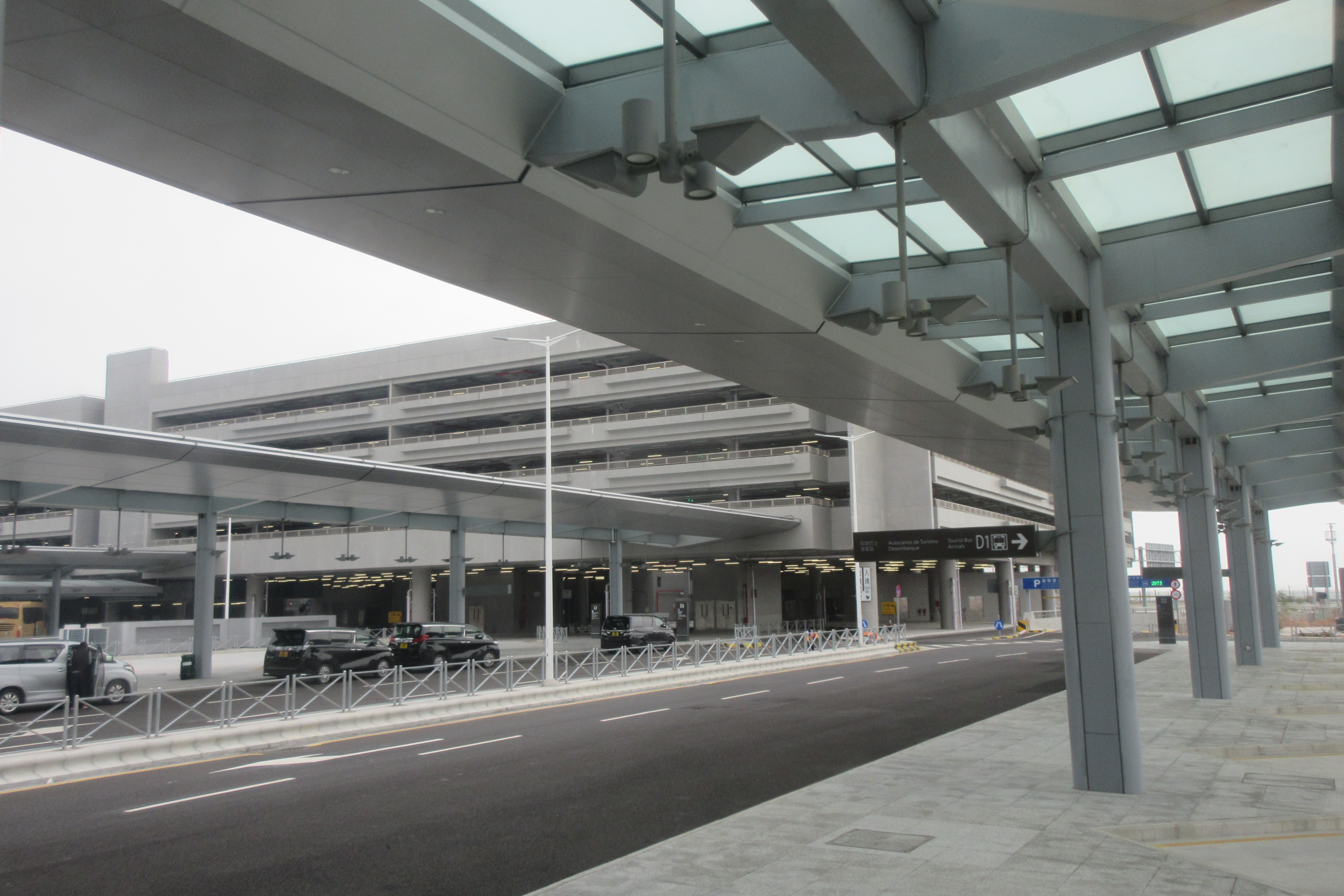
Drop-off area and public car park adjacent to the main Macau Port building.
