= Cheong Kuoc Vá =

- 張國華

Secretary for Security of Macau
- In office 20 December 1999 – 20 December 2014
- Preceded by: Manuel Morge as Secretary for Public Security of Macau
- Succeeded by: Wong Sio Chak

Personal details
- Born: 1956 (age 69–70) Portuguese Macau
- Education: Academy of the Macau Public Security Forces
- Occupation: civil servant
- Profession: policing

Cheong Kuoc Vá (traditional Chinese: 張國華; simplified Chinese: 张国华; pinyin: Zhāng Guóhuá; 1956-) was the first Secretary for Security in Macau Special Administrative Region from 1999 to 2014.

== Biography ==
Born in Macau, Cheong joined the Public Security Police Force upon graduation from Yuet Wah College in 1975. He became a deputy police sergeant in 1982 and, in 1989, section chief of Immigration Affairs, Immigration Bureau.

He furthered his education from 1991 to 1993 with advanced courses from the Security Forces of Macau.

== Government Positions ==
- Deputy Chief of Police Department, 1993-1994
- Head of the Special Police Division of the Special Police Forces, 1994-1996
- Deputy Chief of the Police, 1995-1997
- Chief of the Police, 1997-1999
- Deputy Director for the Affairs of the Macau Security Forces
- Director for the Affairs of the Macau Security Forces

Preceded by Manuel Morge as Secretary for Public Security of Macau	Secretary for Public Security of Macau; 1999-2014	Succeeded by Wong Sio Chak
