= Academy of Public Security Forces of Macao =

Police academy in Coloane, Macau, China

- 澳門保安部隊高等學校; Escola Superior das Forças de Segurança de Macau
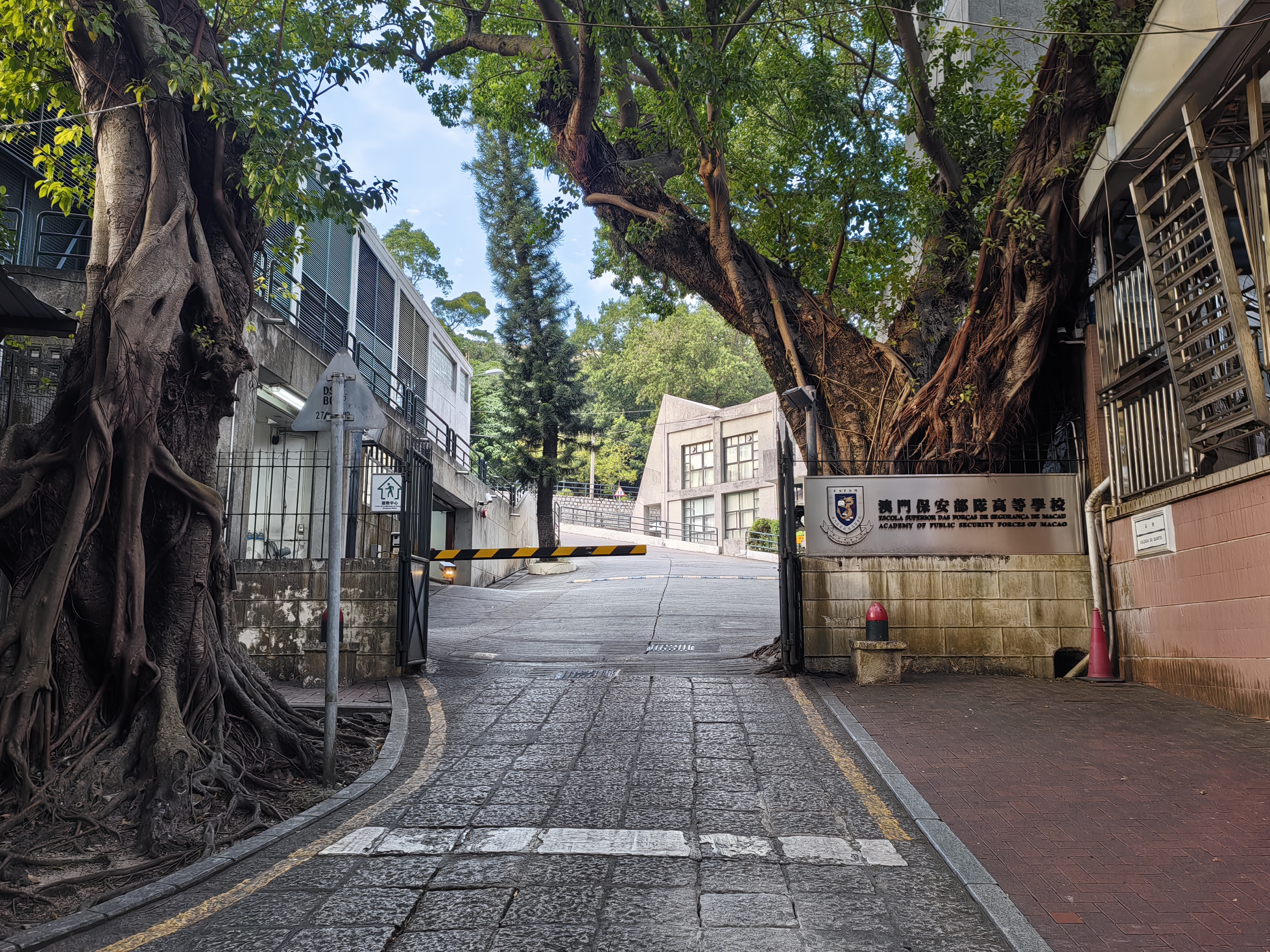
- Type: Public university Police academy Government department
- Established: 4 July 1988; 37 years ago
- Location: Macau
- Website: fsm.gov.mo/esfsm

The Academy of Public Security Forces of Macao (ESFSM) is a government department and a public higher education institution in Coloane, Macau, China. It is under the Secretary for Security of the Government of Macau. It was established on July 4, 1988.

The academy's predecessor was the Security Forces Comprehensive Training Center (保安部隊綜合訓練中心) established in 1978. It is not only a government department that trains police officers, customs officers, prison guards and fire officers in Macau, but also one of the higher education institutions in Macau.
