= Public Security Forces Affairs Bureau of Macau =

Macau's public security body under the Secretariat for Security

Public Security Forces Affairs Bureau of Macau Direcção dos Serviços das Forças de Segurança de Macau 澳門保安部隊事務局
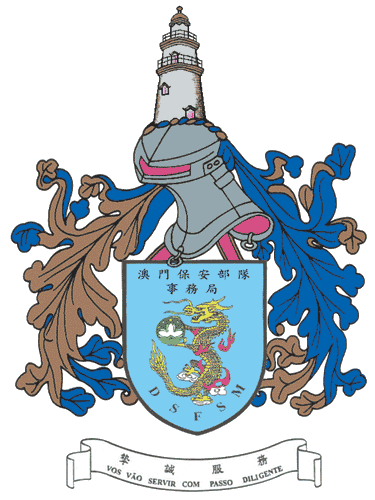

Jurisdictional structure
- Operations jurisdiction: Macau

Operational structure
- Headquarters: Avenida do Comendador Ho Yin, Edifício de Escritórios do Governo (Qingmao), 8.º andar, Macau

Website
- https://www.fsm.gov.mo/dsfsm/cht/

Public Security Forces Affairs Bureau of Macau

Chinese name
- Traditional Chinese: 澳門保安部隊事務局
- Simplified Chinese: 澳门保安部队事务局
Transcriptions

Portuguese name
- Portuguese: Forças de Segurança de Macau

The Public Security Forces Affairs Bureau of Macau (Chinese: 澳門保安部隊事務局, Portuguese: Direcção dos Serviços das Forças de Segurança de Macau) (DSFSM) is government department of the Macau Government, it is responsible for public security, civil defence, and protection of persons and property.

== History ==
The DSFSM's predecessor is the Macau Security Forces Services Directorate (Chinese: 澳門保安部隊司令部, Portuguese: Direcção dos Serviços das Forças de Segurança de Macau)), it was formed on 28 January 1991. It was supervised by the Secretary for Public Security, and was led by one director assisted by two deputy directors.

== Duties ==
- Providing technical and administrative assistance in the legal, personnel, logistics, financial management, communications, infrastructure, organization and information aspects within the Public Security Forces, as well as providing assistance in planning, coordination and process standardization;
- Assisting in research and analysis of proposals upon orders from superiors;
- Participating in the planning of any activities related to the Public Security Forces and make opinions on such matters;
- Conducting research and make recommendations on measures of a normative, administrative and technical nature within the scope of the Public Security Forces;
- Ensuring the public image and etiquette of the Public Security Forces;
- Researching, proposing and coordinating the overall development of the information field of the Public Security Forces, especially promoting the coordination of information, data sharing and security system functions within the Macao Security Forces, in order to coordinate with the strategic development of the Macao Government;
- Coordinating and manage the operation of the land port border inspection building managed by the Macao Security Forces;
- Providing assistance to other departments belonging to the internal security system of Macao when instructed by the Secretary for Security;
- To perform any work other than the above in accordance with the orders of the Secretary for Security, but the nature of which shall fall within the overall scope of the agency's duties

Source: Official website

== See also ==
- People's Liberation Army Macau Garrison
