= Correctional Services Bureau =

Agency responsible for maintaining inmates in Macau, China

Coordinates: 22.119616°N 113.554602°E

- 懲教管理局; Direcção dos Serviços Correccionais
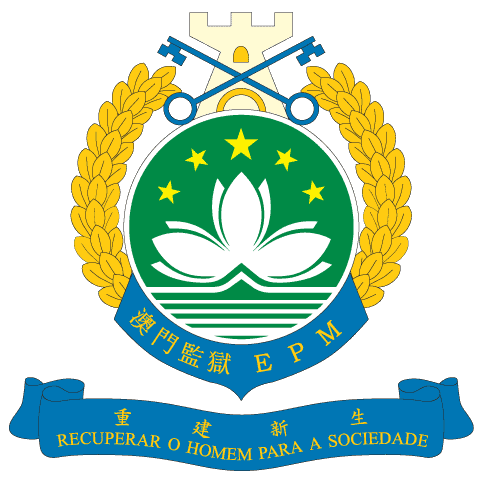

Agency overview
- Formed: 1904
- Preceding agencies: Macau Prison; Youth Correctional Institution, Legal Affairs Bureau
- Jurisdiction: Macau
- Headquarters: Rua de S. Francisco Xavier, Coloane
- Minister responsible: Wong Sio Chak, Secretary for Security
- Agency executives: Lee Kam Cheong, Director of Macau Prison; Lei Cheong Wang, Head of Security and Vigilance Division
- Website: www.dsc.gov.mo

Correctional Services Bureau

Chinese name
- Traditional Chinese: 懲教管理局
- Simplified Chinese: 惩教管理局
- Jyutping: cing4 gaau3 gun2 lei5 guk6
Transcriptions
Standard Mandarin
- Hanyu Pinyin: Chéng Jiāo Guǎnlǐ Jú
Yue: Cantonese
- Jyutping: cing4 gaau3 gun2 lei5 guk6

Portuguese name
- Portuguese: Direcção dos Serviços Correccionais

Coloane Prison

Chinese name
- Traditional Chinese: 路環監獄
- Simplified Chinese: 监狱路环
- Jyutping: lou6 waan4 gaam1 juk6
Transcriptions
Standard Mandarin
- Hanyu Pinyin: Lùhuán Jiānyù
Yue: Cantonese
- Jyutping: lou6 waan4 gaam1 juk6

Macau Prison
- Traditional Chinese: 澳門監獄
- Simplified Chinese: 澳门监狱
- Jyutping: ou3 mun4*2 gaam1 juk6
Transcriptions
Standard Mandarin
- Hanyu Pinyin: Àomén Jiānyù
Yue: Cantonese
- Jyutping: ou3 mun4*2 gaam1 juk6

Portuguese name
- Portuguese: Estabelecimento Prisional de Coloane/Estabelecimento Prisional de Macau

The Correctional Services Bureau (Chinese: 懲教管理局, Portuguese: Direcção dos Serviços Correccionais, DSC) is the agency responsible for maintaining inmates in Macau. It is under the administration of the Secretariat for Security.

== History ==
On 1 January 2016, Macau Prison (Estabelecimento Prisional de Macau) and the Youth Correctional Institution that was under the Legal Affairs Bureau were re-structured as the Correctional Services Bureau.

== Functions ==
Per article 1 of Administrative Regulation No. 27/2015, the duties of the agency are to:

1. Collaborate in defining prison policies and policies relating to the activities of the Youth Correctional Institution;
2. Ensure the administrative and financial management of Coloane Prison and the Youth Correctional Institution, prepare regulations and exercise technical guidance and superintendence;
3. Ensure the organization and operation relating to the management and system of prison affairs;
4. Ensure the organization and operation relating to the management and system of educational guardianship measures for detained youths;
5. Cooperate, within the scope of its duties, with private entities to promote the social reintegration of prisoners and detained youths.

== Population ==
In 2004, there were about 921 (784 men and 137 women) inmates in the prison and divided amongst male and female inmates. With the 2010 population at 926, a new prison is being built in Ka Ho as the current facility can only hold 1500. The new prison was scheduled to open in 2014. However, this has since been delayed. At the end of December 2018, Coloane Prison held 1,458 inmates, 13.5% more than a year earlier.

Circa 2014 there were 959 prisoners, including 195 women. The total occupancy rate was 84%, with the women's area having an occupancy rate of 83%. Circa 2014 an expansion of the women's area was to add capacity for an additional 315 prisoners.

== Ranks ==
Per Law No. 2/2008 (Restructure of the Careers in the Security Forces and Departments), the following ranks are observed in the agency:

- Chief Superintendent (Comissário-Chefe)
- Superintendent (Comissário)
- Chief Officer (Chefe)
- Officer (Subchefe)
- Principal Prison Guard (Guarda Principal)
- 1st Class Prison Guard (Guarda de 1ª)
- Prison Guard (Guarda)

== Facilities ==
Due to the area's small population, there is only one prison for adults in Macau; Coloane Prison (路環監獄; Estabelecimento Prisional de Coloane or EPC), also known as Macau Prison (澳門監獄; Estabelecimento Prisional de Macau or EPM) was opened in 1990 and replaced the former Central Prison on the mainland (built from 1904 to 1909). The facility consists of a series or connected buildings surrounded by a white wall with barbed wire. Four watchtowers are found along the prison walls.

There is also a juvenile detention facility in Macau, the Youth Correctional Institution (少年感化院; siu3 nin4 gam2 faa3 jyun2; Shàonián Gǎnhuàyuàn; Instituto de Menores), also in Coloane, with sections for boys and girls.

Due to Coloane Prison being at almost full capacity, a new facility is under construction in Ka Ho. Construction of this facility began in 2010 and was scheduled to open by 2014 but has since been delayed till 19 October 2024.

The UK FCDO stated that overcrowding began to be an issue at Coloane Prison since 2010.

In October 1998 the prison had separate areas for members of Macau triads. That year, Alison Dakota Gee and Paulo Azevedo of Asiaweek (via CNN) stated that the facility "is not the worst place to wind up behind bars."

== See also ==
- Hong Kong Correctional Services
