= Fire Services Bureau =

Agency in Macau, China

- 消防局; Corpo de Bombeiros

Agency overview
- Established: 1851; renamed 1976
- Employees: 739
- Commissioner: Secretariat for Security
- Fire chief: Commander

Facilities and equipment
- Stations: 7
- Trucks: 38
- Ambulances: 9

Website
- www.fsm.gov.mo/cb

Fire Services Bureau

Chinese name
- Chinese: 消防局
Transcriptions
Standard Mandarin
- Hanyu Pinyin: Xiāofángjú
Yue: Cantonese
- Jyutping: siu1 fong4 guk6

Portuguese name
- Portuguese: Corpo de Bombeiros

The Fire Services Bureau (Chinese: 消防局; Portuguese: Corpo de Bombeiros, (Note: Meaning "fire department" in the literal translation.) CB) is responsible for fire and rescue services in Macau. The department is organized under the Macau Security Force (since 1976 after decades as a division of public works, Leal Senado and municipal control). The brigade is responsible for fire and rescue for both land and air.

The CB operates an ambulance service (Ambulância de Macau), but the Macau Red Cross also operates ambulances (Toyota HiAce vans) for emergency and non-emergencies to local hospitals with volunteer staff.

The organization has a total of 739 uniformed firefighters and paramedics serving from seven fire stations in Macau with one central HQ on Macau.

== History ==
The FSB traces its origin to volunteer fire brigades in Macau in 1851 before it became a full-time department in 1883. In 1999, the FSB became a fully civilian agency.

== Stations ==
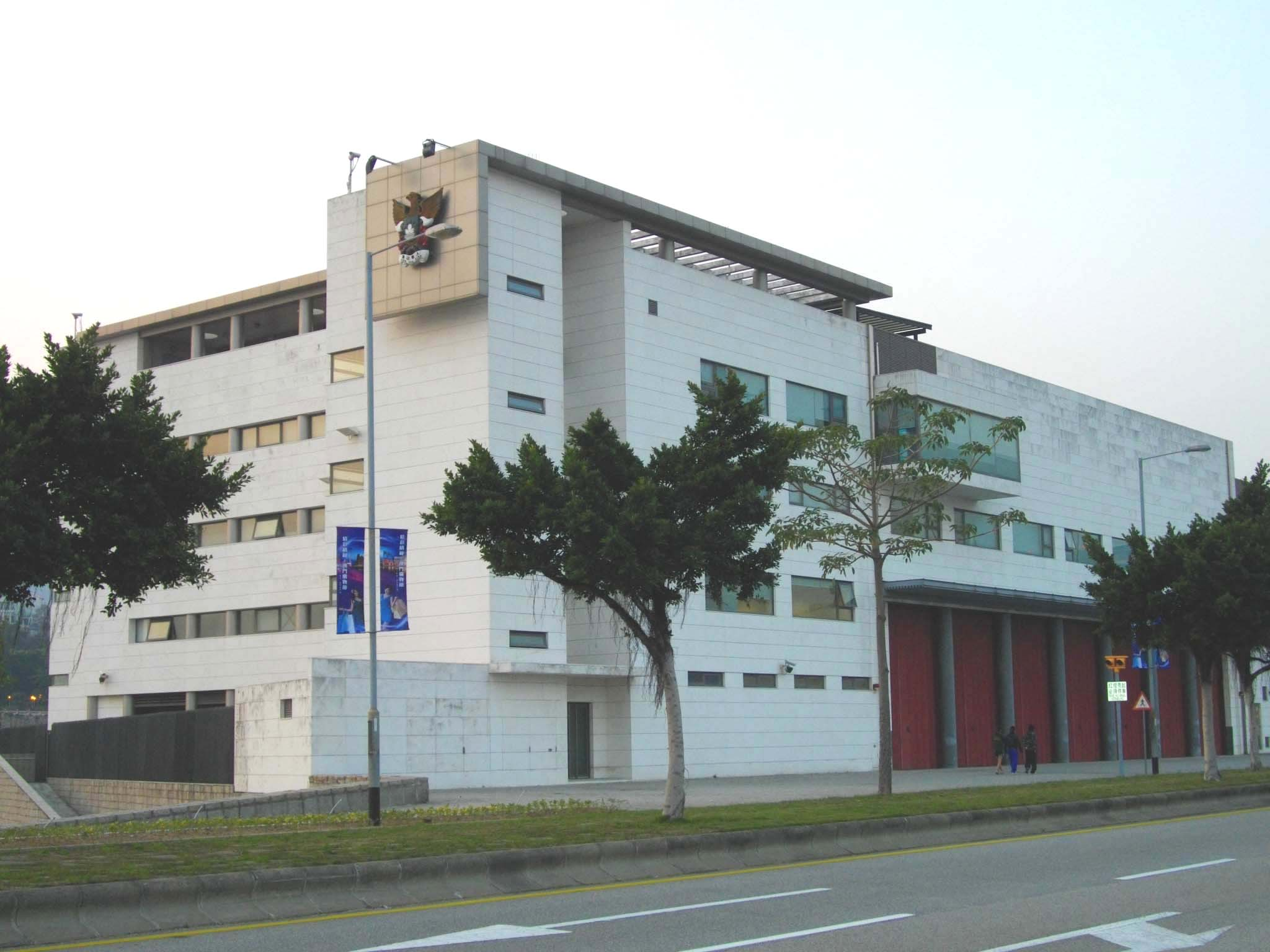
Sai Van Lake Fire Station and FS Headquarters

Areia Preta Fire Station and Fire School

Central Fire Station (Old FS Headquarters)

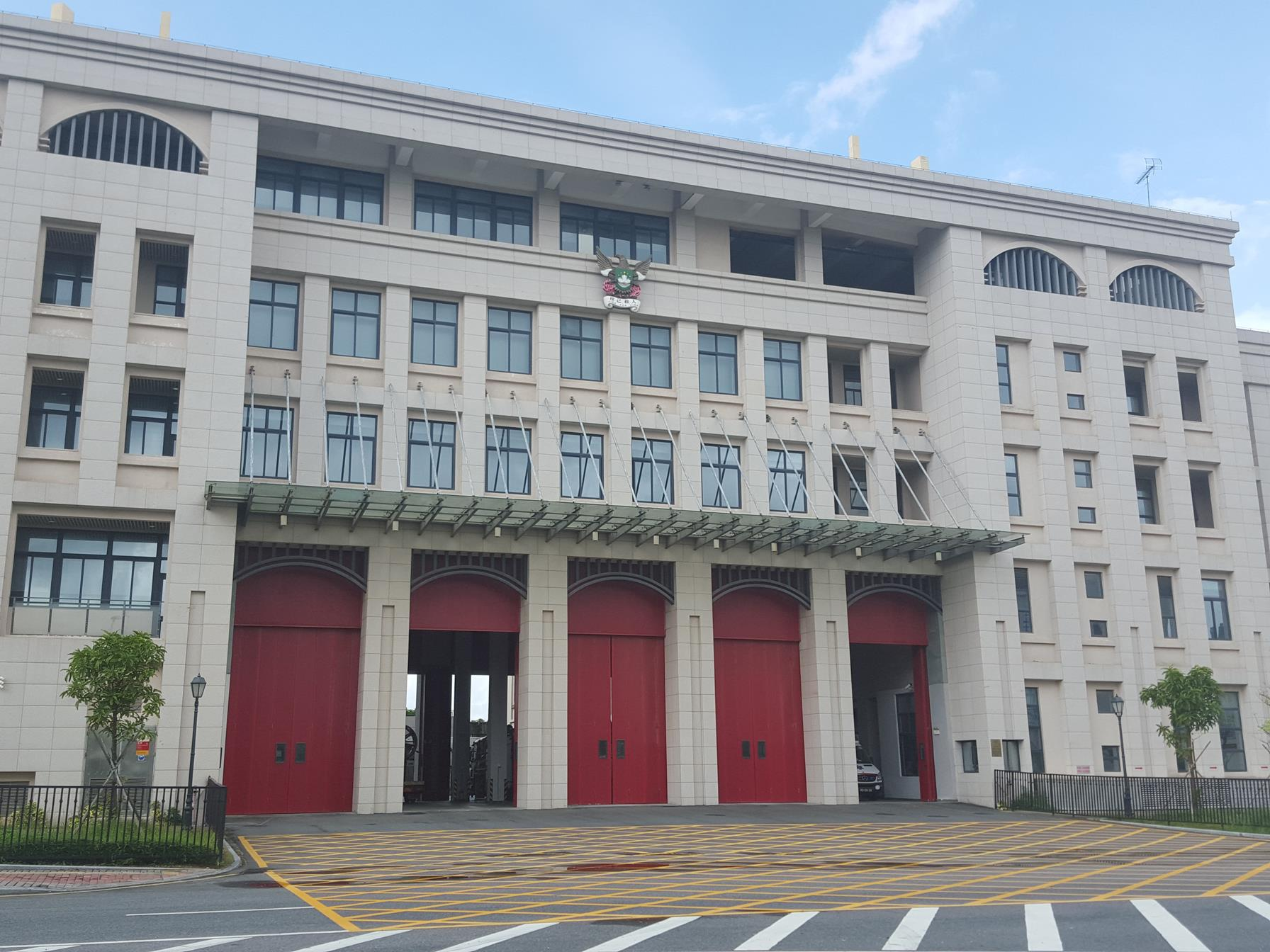
UM Fire Station

Macau's fire brigade began with a single station in 1883 and had three by 1916:

- Station 1 – Central at Estrada de Coelho do Amaral (Now fire museum)
- Station 2 – Avenida Almirante Sérgio
- Station 3 – Avenida Horta e Costa

As of 2011, there are seven fire stations in Macau:

Mainland

- Lago Sai Van (Avenida Dr. Stanley Ho) – modern five-storey building housing fire and ambulance operations; located next to Sai Van Lake; completed 2006 and home to fire services headquarters
- Areia Preta (bounded by Dr. Francisco Vieira Machado Do and Marginal da Areia Preta, Estrada Nordeste, Avenida Do and Nova Da Areia Preta Rua) – second station on mainland and designed by architect Manuel Vicente (1992–1996)

Taipa

- Taipa (Rua Siu Kuan, Rua Nam Keng) – fire and ambulance depot; fire training tower on the north end of Taipa
- Airport Division – two stations at the airport with one main depot (along runway) and one sub-depot (next to north end of terminal)

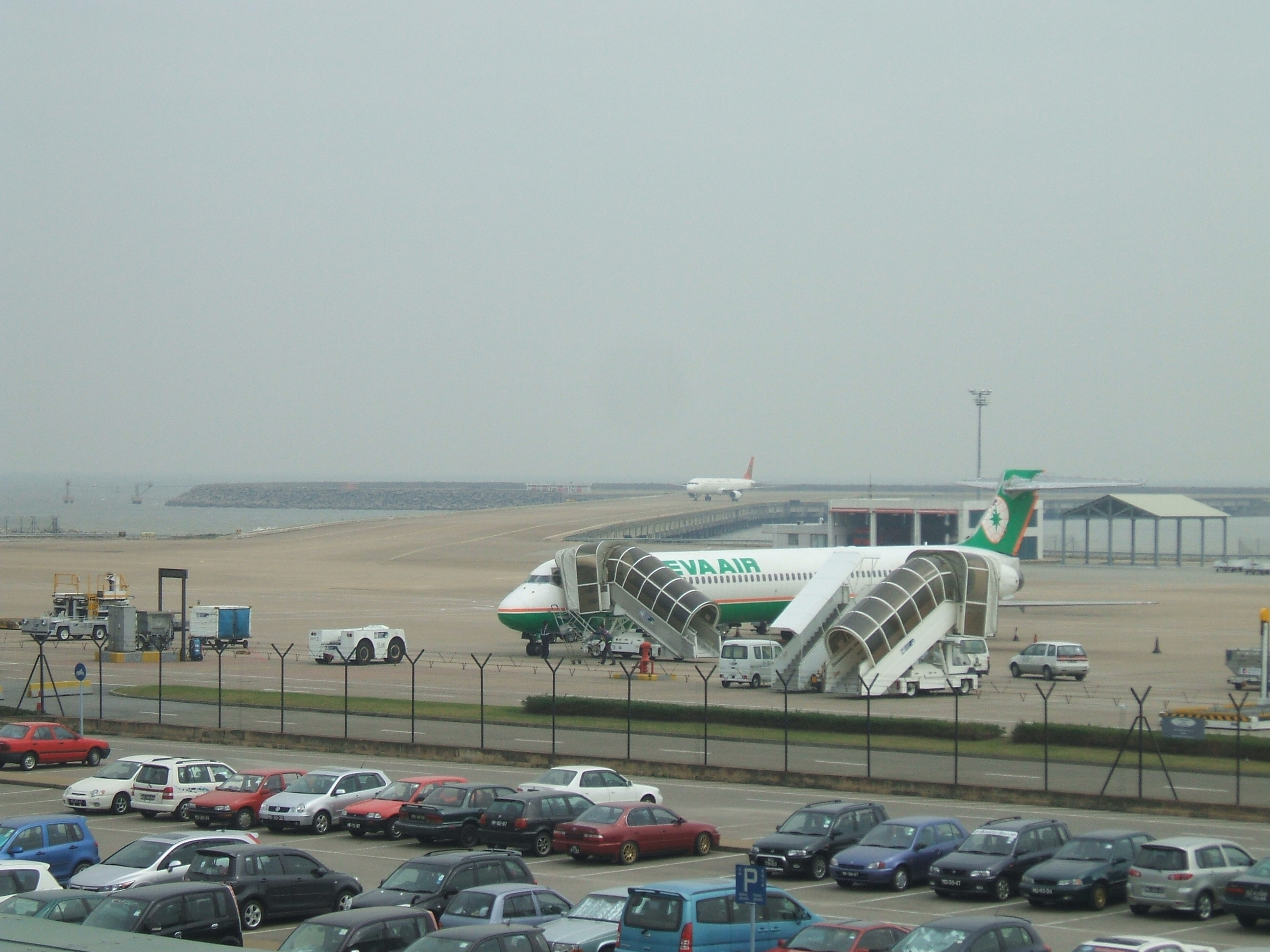
Macau Airport fire sub-station behind aircraft

Coloane

- (Estrada do Alto de Coloane and Estrada do Dique Oeste) – fire services depot

Cotai

- (Rua Campo) – fire operations station constructed 2009–2010

Hengqin

- Hengqin Fire Station - newest fire station opened in 2013 as temporary site and fully in 2015. This location is within UM campus grounds and not to be mistaken for the Hengqin Fire Station in Zhuhai.

Central Command Centre and Museum is a two-storey colonial building formerly Station 1 and fire headquarters.

== Commissioners ==
- Loi Kam Wan – Commissioner Macau Fire Service
  - Eurico Lopes Fazenda – Deputy Commissioner Macau Fire Service
  - Lei Pun Chi – Deputy Commissioner Macau Fire Service

== Rank ==
The following ranks are observed in the CB in accordance with Law No. 2/2008 (Restructure of the Careers in the Security Forces and Departments):

Superior Career (高級職程; Carreiras Superiores)

- Chief major (消防總監; Chefe-mor)
- Adjunct chief major (副消防總監; Chefe-mor adjunto)
- Principal chief (消防總長; Chefe principal)
- Adjunct chief (副消防總長; Chefe-ajundante)
- First class chief (一等消防區長; Chefe de primeira)
- Assistant chief (副一等消防區長; Chefe assistante)

Basic Career (基礎職程; Carreira de Base)

- Chief (消防區長; Chefe)
- Officer Candidate (準消防官; Aspirante a oficial)
- Deputy chief (副消防區長; Subchefe) This Rank is utilised when a Firefighter is in the Officer Formation Course.
- Chief firefighter (首席消防員 Bombeiro principal)
- First class firefighter (一等消防員; Bombeiro de primeira)
- Firefighter (消防員; Bombeiro)

== Fleet ==
=== Land vehicles ===
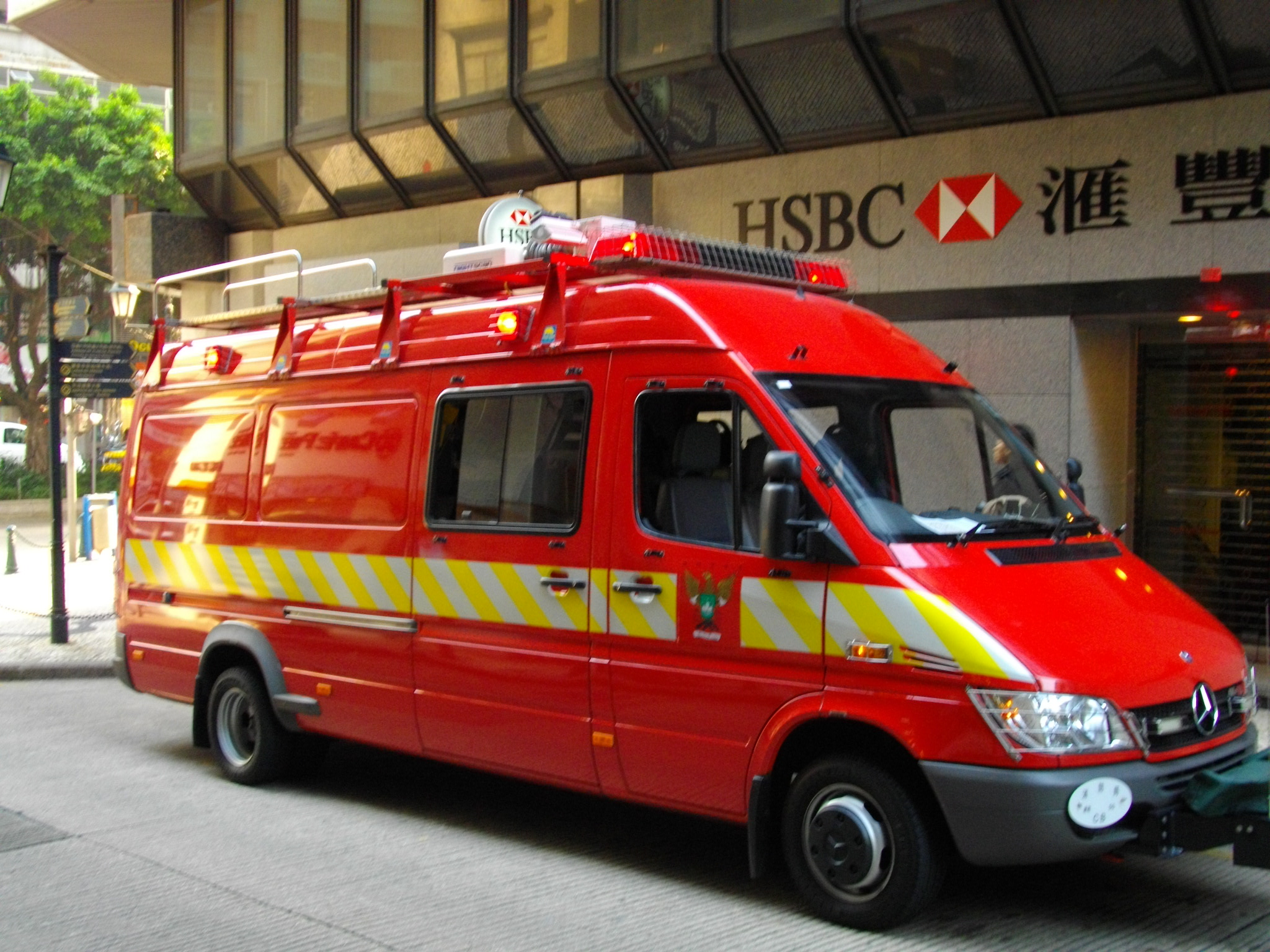
Fire engine

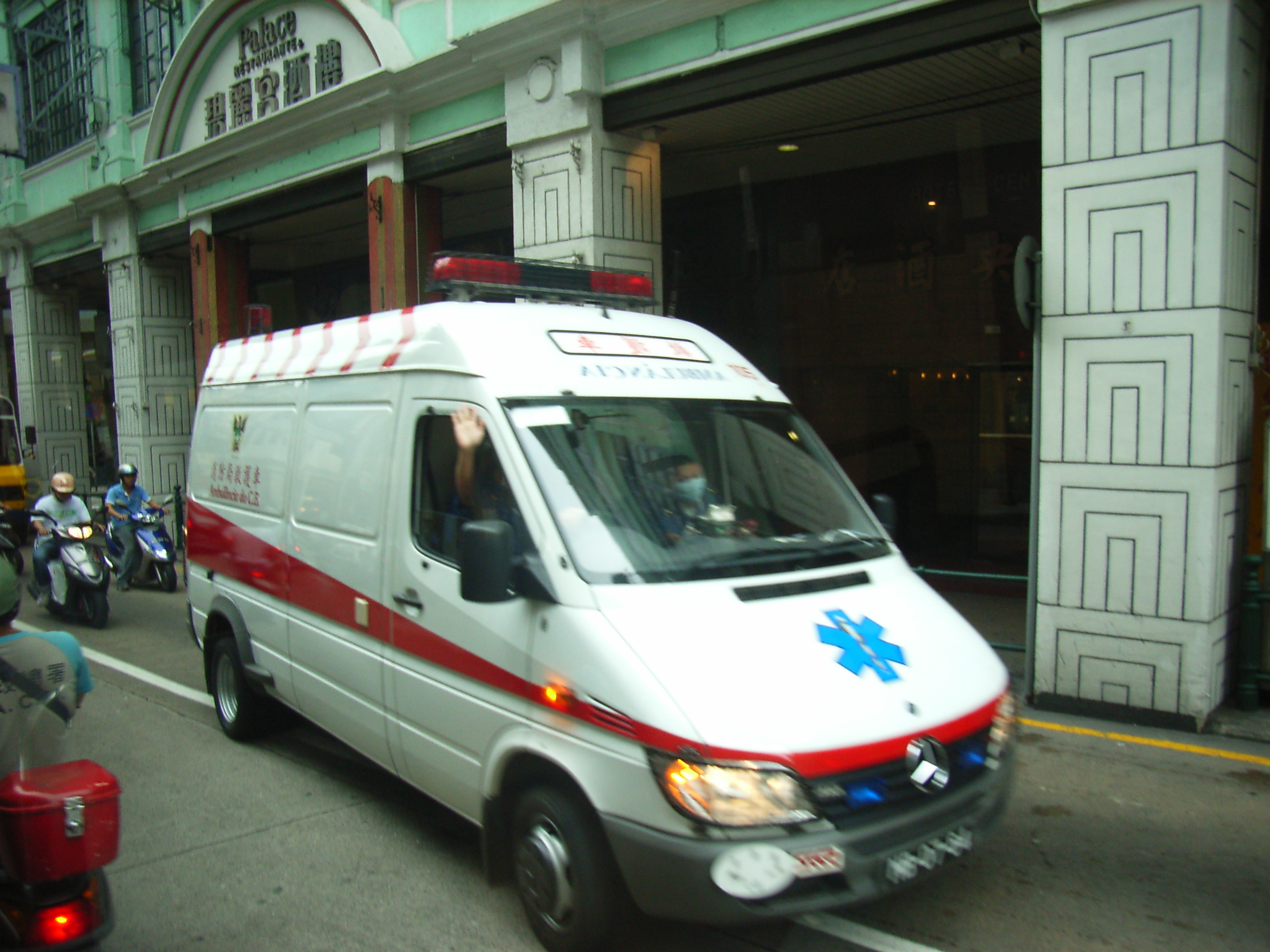
Ambulance

- Honda Civic City Command Car Japan
- Mercedes-Benz Bronto Skylift F52 HLA snorkel Germany
- Scania Heavy Rescue Tender Sweden
- Land Rover Defender rescue operation United Kingdom
- Scania TTL aerial Sweden
- Scania 114G HAZMAT tender Sweden
- Mitsubishi Canter TLF Japan
- Mitsubishi STLF FUSO/Morita Snorkel 17M Japan
- Mazda Astina 1.8 Commander Car Japan
- Suzuki Commander Car Japan
- Mitsubishi Canter TLF Japan
- Mercedes-Benz 3535 Germany
- Scania 94D Heavy Rescue Unit Sweden
- Mercedes-Benz Sprinter Rescue Unit Germany
- Mercedes-Benz 412 Ambulance Germany
- Suzuki Van Japan
- Mercedes-Benz 210 Ambulance Germany – Ambulância de Macau
- Mitsubishi Fuso/Morita 40M TL Japan
- Iveco Magirus 260-32AH/DL 50 Italy
- Mercedes-Benz 1622/Metz DLK30 Germany
- Mitsubishi Fuso/Morita AP17 Japan
- Mitsubishi/Morita TLF 2500 Japan
- Mitsubishi/Morita TLF 1500 Japan
- Mitsubishi Canter TLF 1500 Japan
- Mitsubishi Canter GW Japan
- Land Rover TLF United Kingdom
- Suzuki Commander Car Japan
- Mitsubishi Van Japan
- Mercedes-Benz 210 Ambulance Germany – Ambulância de Macau
- Roewe Marvel X command car China
- Rosenbauer Panther airport crash tender Austria
- Oshkosh T3000 airport crash tender United States

=== Boats ===
- Boston Whaler Challenger – 27' fire and rescue boat United States – managed by Macau Marine Department
- SEN Engenharia e Arquitectura Naval, Multi-Purpose Rescue and Fire Boat Portugal – for use at airport

=== Air Support ===
Sky Shuttle Helicopters can provides search and rescue support when victims need to be transported by area to hospital for treatment.

Ambulances are European standard Type B.

== Uniform and gear ==
The uniform and insignia worn by CB personnel follows the model worn by the firefighters of Portugal.

The gear worn by the CB are similar to ones worn in Hong Kong:

- Pacific F3D fire helmet – fire crews
- F1 Gallet fire helmet – fire crews

Firefighters wear yellow helmets, while senior officers use blue.

- Nomex protection hood

Ambulance officers use chartreuse safety helmet with visor.
