= Public Security Police Force =

Branch of the Macau Security Force

Public Security Police Force Corpo de Polícia de Segurança Pública 治安警察局

Agency overview
- Formed: 14 March 1691
- Employees: 6,355

Jurisdictional structure
- Operations jurisdiction: Macau, China
- Governing body: Unitary Police Services Macau Security Force
- General nature: Civilian police

Operational structure
- Headquarters: Edifício Conforseg; Praceta de 1 de Outubro; Macau, China
- Elected officer responsible: Wong Sio Chak, Secretariat for Security
- Agency executive: Ng Kam Wa, Superintendent General

Website
- fsm.gov.mo/psp/eng

Public Security Police Force

Chinese name
- Chinese: 治安警察局
Transcriptions
Standard Mandarin
- Hanyu Pinyin: Zhì'ān Jǐngchájú
Yue: Cantonese
- Jyutping: zi6 on1 ging2 caat3 guk6

Portuguese name
- Portuguese: Corpo de Polícia de Segurança Pública de Macau

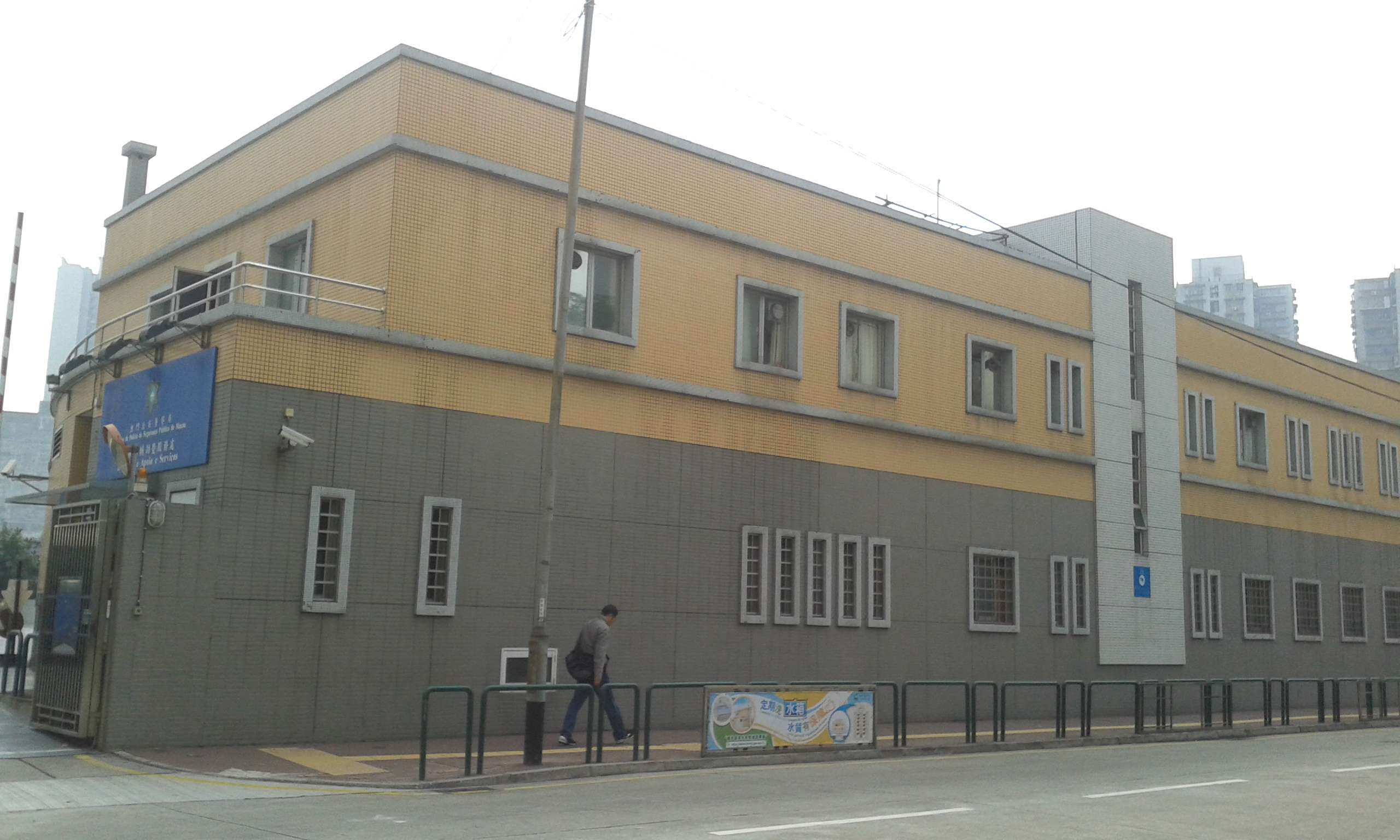
The No.2 of Police Commissioner office

The Public Security Police Force (Chinese: 治安警察局; Portuguese: Corpo de Polícia de Segurança Pública de Macau, abbreviated CPSP) is the non-criminal police department of Macau and a branch of the Macau Security Force. Originally known at first as the Macau Police (Portuguese: Polícia de Macau), the force went through several name changes before taking on its current name. The PSP celebrates its foundation on 14 March 1691.

Due to the one country, two systems perspective, it is organisationally separate from the mainland authorities. CPSPM is organisationally independent from the jurisdiction of the mainland's Public Security Ministry.

The force is currently headed by Ng Kam Wa since 20 December 2019.

== History ==
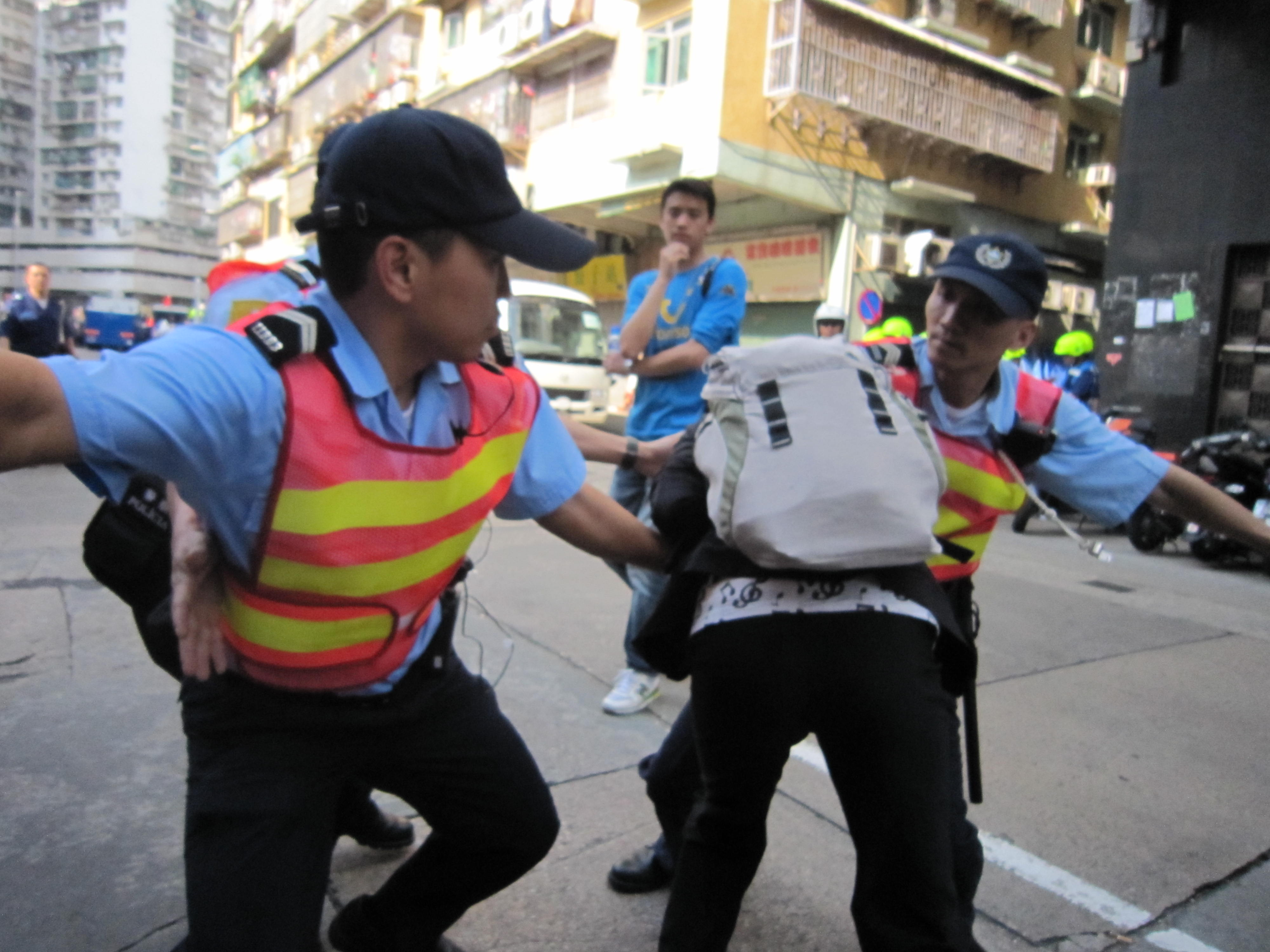
PSPFM officers restrain a protester during 1 May 2010 protests in Macau.

Law enforcement was first taken by the military stationed in Portuguese Macau, with Portuguese Navy troops at first before the Portuguese Army stepped in to take over internal security duties on 14 March 1691. A small garrison was raised to conduct police work at first, but had the majority of its duties taken over by Portuguese India-based soldiers in 1784. On 13 May 1810, the Prince Regent Battalion was created to be the colony's police force, consisting of four companies of 400 men. Two companies were based at the Customs House while the other two was based at Fortaleza do Monte (Mount Fortress).

On 3 March 1841, a royal decree had approved the creation of a permanent police force, which was staffed by Macanese citizens who were not part of the battalion. A group of night watchmen called the Guard's Bazar was created by Bernardino de Senna Fernandes with some assistance from local Macanese Chinese to patrol residential areas at night, which was recognized as a legal law enforcement body by the Portuguese Macau government. With an initial count of 50 men, it was soon raised with 100 men. In 1861, the governor passed an ordinance that renamed the force from Macau Police to the Macau Police Force (Abbreviation: CPM; Portuguese: Corpo de Polícia de Macau). In 1862, the CPM was given the power to patrol the colony's waters through Ordinance No. 56, 18 November 1862, under 1868 when the role was assigned to the Macau Port Police (Abbreviation: PPM; Portuguese: Polícia do Porto de Macau). Moors were recruited into the ranks in 1873 with a Moor section established on 9 August 1874.

Governor Eugenio Carlos Correa da Silva dissolved the CPM on 18 January 1879, replacing it with the Macau Police Guard (Abbreviation: GPM; Portuguese: Guarda de Polícia de Macau). They were based at the Barracks San Francisco as part of the GPM's establishment. In 1912, Provincial Ordinance no. 106, 10 June 1912, had called for the GPM to be led by a county administrator, being assisted by both staff and police officers alike. Daniel Ferreira, the county administrator in 1914, created the police force's civil branch with a strength of 300 officers. A security police branch was established in 1916, with a strength of 304 officers paid with a salary of 7,810 MOP.

The post of Police Commissioner of Public Security in Macau was made separate from the colony administrator under Executive Order 533 in 1937, with the creation of the PSP (modelled after the Portuguese Homeland PSP) at first under the command of a captain or a lieutenant in the Portuguese Army. The PSP's police band was created in 1951 under Luis Augusto de Matos Paletti to serve as the force's ceremonial unit in official events. A social recovery center was created in 1961 to help take care of troubled people such as orphans, homeless or foreign nationals living in Macau without any permanent residence. By May 1968, the PSP served as a military organization under the Portuguese colonial government. Female officers were first recruited by the PSP on 7 October 1974, when 42 candidates were accepted into service. Decree-Law No. 705/75 of 27 December 1975, placed the PSP under the Security Forces of Macau alongside the Marine Police, Fiscal Police and the Fire Department.

Further restructuring of the PSP took place in 1981 when Decree No. 37/81/M was passed to amend the earlier Decree No. 22/77/M. It established the PSP's divisions consisting of Command, Division of Police Macau Police Division of the Isles, Police Tactical Intervention Unit, Division of Transit Services, Migration and Identity, Music Band, Center for Recovery and Social Welfare. The PSP's Police School was created on 18 July 1982, with Portuguese officers serving as the institution's first instructors. Another round of restructuring took place on 8 February 1986, with the passing of Decree-Law No. 13/86/M, which created additional PSP divisions, consisting of Command, General Staff and Command organs, Divisions of Police and General Support, Organs Support Services and Education.

=== Ending of Portuguese rule ===
In 1995, the PSP went through a third phrase of restructuring through the passing of Decree-Law No. 3/95/M, defining its overall structure consisting of Command and Control Bodies, Department of Resource Management, Department Information, Operations Department, Migration Service, Transit Department, Macau Police Department, Islands Police Departments, Police Tactical Intervention Unit, Training Command, Police Academy and the Music Band. Portuguese-born PSP officers began leaving their posts also at the same year, being replaced by Macanese-born PSP officers.

In 1999, Lieutenant Colonel Manuel António Meireles de Carvalho passed on command of the PSP to its new commander, Superintendent General Jose Proença Branco. With the transfer of sovereignty on 20 December of that year, the PSP changed its emblem, replacing the former Portuguese coat of arms with that of the Emblem of Macau. Contemporary media reports recorded that PSP personnel substituted their new cap badges for the former Portuguese insignia precisely at the moment of handover.

The PSP's Police School moved its location from its old headquarters at the Center for Social Recovery and began work on the Academy of Security Forces at Coloane after the People's Liberation Army Macau Garrison was created in Macau in May 2000.

Superintendent General Jose Proenca Branco was replaced by Superintendent Law Siu Peng after former Macau Chief Executive Edmund Ho Hau Wah on 17 September 2001, passed Decree No. 66/2001.

=== SAR control ===
In 2017, the PSPFM established the Tourism Police unit.

On 8 April 2019, the force announced that Vong Vai Hong, the Assistant Commissioner was appointed as the Deputy Commissioner. On 9 October 2019, Assistant Commissioner Leong Heng Hong was made the Deputy Commissioner.

In August 2023, Secretary for Security Wong Sio Chak stated that no auxiliary unit will be set up in the PSPFM despite calls from local community leaders and lawmakers, due to financial and legal complexity reasons.

=== Controversies ===
The PSPFM's credibility suffered in the 2007 Macau labour protest when a bystander was injured from a bullet fired by PSPM officers as warning shots to break up protests.

The PSPFM announced that several of its officers, including a retired officer, were arrested during an anti-extortion operation.

== Vehicles ==
All marked vehicles employed by the PSP have an all blue finish with the seal of the force. Previously, all of them had a white finish.

Some of the vehicles used or are currently in use:

- Honda Civic – patrol car
- Hyundai Santa Fe – patrol car
- Mazda 3 – patrol car
- Toyota Corolla – patrol car
- Suzuki Carry – lorry
- Toyota LiteAce light van
- Honda VFR800P motorcycle
- BMW R-series RTP motorcycle
- Toyota Hiace van
- Toyota Townace Van
- Mitsubishi Outlander SUV
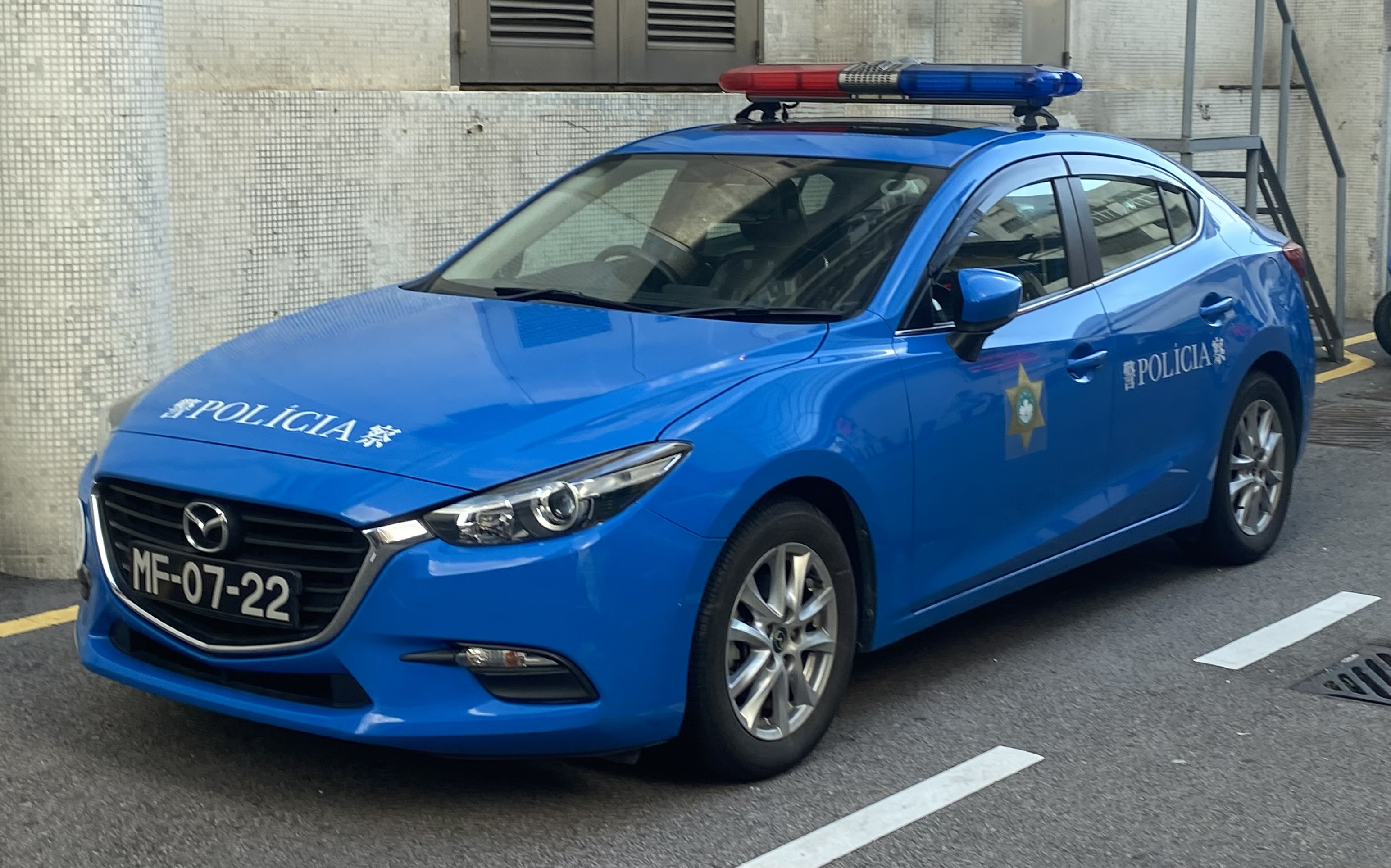
Mazda3 patrol car

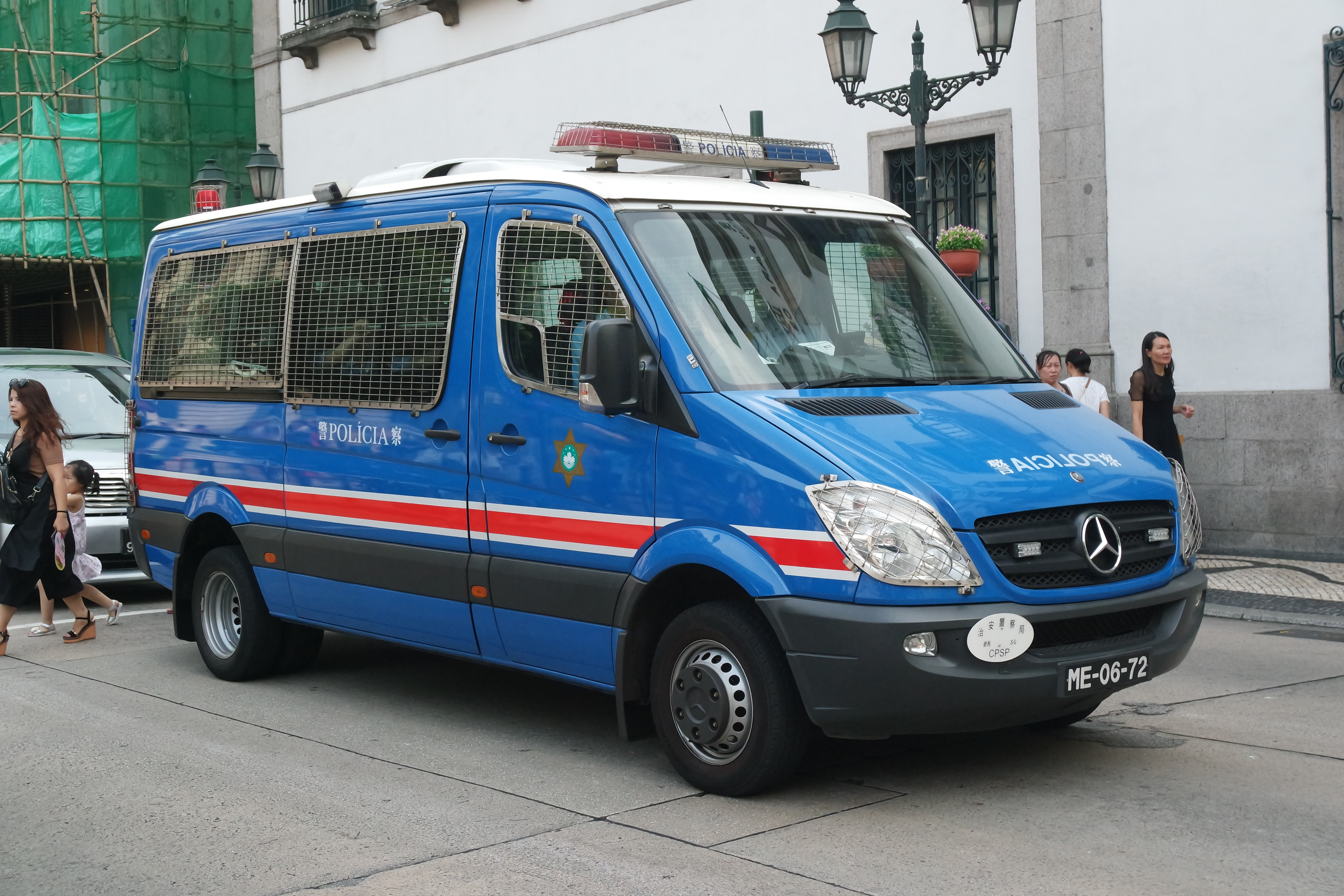
Mercedes-Benz Sprinter van

== Equipment ==
Uniform officers wear a utility belt which holds a sidearm, extra ammunition, a handcuff, an extendable baton, a pepper spray, a Motorola radio with a connected remote speaker microphone attached to the shoulder and a body-mounted camera.

The following are used by the PSPF:

Name	Country of origin	Type	Notes
Smith & Wesson Model 10	United States	Revolver	Standard issue for patrol officers
Colt Detective Special	United States	Revolver	Standard issue for detectives
Glock 19	Austria	Semi-automatic pistol	Exclusive use by the Unidade Especial de Polícia (UEP)
SIG Sauer P250 DCc	United States	Semi-automatic pistol	Exclusive use by the Unidade Especial de Polícia (UEP)
Glock 17	Austria	Semi-automatic pistol	Exclusive use by the Unidade Especial de Polícia (UEP)
SIG Sauer P226	Germany	Semi-automatic pistol	Exclusive use by the Unidade Especial de Polícia (UEP)
SIG Sauer P228	Germany	Semi-automatic pistol	Exclusive use by the Unidade Especial de Polícia (UEP)
Remington 870	United States	Shotgun	Standard issue
Maverick 88	United States	Shotgun	Exclusive use by the Grupo de Operações Especiais (GOE)
Franchi SPAS-15	Italy	Shotgun	Exclusive use by the Grupo de Operações Especiais (GOE)
Heckler & Koch MP5	Germany	Submachine gun	Standard issue; various variants utilised
Brügger & Thomet MP9	Switzerland	Submachine gun	Exclusive use by the Grupo de Operações Especiais (GOE)
Heckler & Koch G3	Germany	Semi-automatic rifle	Ceremonial rifle under the Portuguese Espingarda m/961 designation
Type 56-1	China	Assault rifle	Ceremonial rifle for the Chinese straight march
Type 56	China	semi-automatic rifle	Ceremonial rifle for the Chinese straight march
QBZ-191	China	Assault rifle	Ceremonial rifle for the Chinese straight march
Heckler & Koch G36KV	Germany	Assault rifle	Exclusive use by the Grupo de Operações Especiais (GOE)
SIG SG 551	Switzerland	Assault rifle	Exclusive use by the Grupo de Operações Especiais (GOE)
SIG SG 552	Switzerland	Assault rifle	Exclusive use by the Grupo de Operações Especiais (GOE)
SIG-Sauer SSG 3000	Switzerland	Sniper rifle	Exclusive use by the Grupo de Operações Especiais (GOE)
B&T SPR 223	Switzerland	Sniper rifle	Exclusive use by the Grupo de Operações Especiais (GOE)
CS/LR4A	China	Sniper rifle	Exclusive use by the Grupo de Operações Especiais (GOE)
Oberland Arms OA-15	Germany	Semi-automatic_rifle	Exclusive use by the Grupo de Operações Especiais (GOE)
Federal Riot Gun	United States	Less-lethal option	Standard issue riot control launcher for Unidade Especial de Polícia (UEP) officers
Flash-ball	France	Less-lethal option	Exclusive riot control launcher for Unidade Especial de Polícia (UEP) officers

== Organisation ==
The PSPFM is currently organized according to the following structure as of 2021:

- Resources Management Department
  - Human Resources Division
  - Material Resources Division
  - Financial Resources Office
- Information Department
  - Research and Information Division
  - Commissioner of General Issues
- Operations Department
  - Operations and Communications Division
  - Public Relations Division
- Migration Service – acts as immigration services
  - Immigration Division
  - Frontier Control Division
- Traffic Department
  - Traffic Control Commission
  - Traffic Commission for Macau Peninsula
  - Traffic Commission for the Islands
- Police Department for Macau Peninsula
- Police Department for the Islands
  - Airport Division
- Police Intervention Tactical Unit (Portuguese: Unidade Especial de Polícia, UEP, Chinese: 特警隊)
  - High Entities and Important Facilities Protection Group (Portuguese: Grupo de Protecção de Altas Entidades, GPAE, Chinese: 保護重要人物及設施組, more commonly known as G4)
  - Special Operations Group (Portuguese: Grupo de Operações Especiais, GOE, Chinese: 特別行動組)
- Police School
- Support Division and Services

== Rank structure ==
=== Senior Command ===
The PSP is commanded by a superintendent-general, who is assisted by two superintendents.

Other positions or offices in the PSP organization includes:

- Legal Advisor
- Discipline Counsel
- Support Office Command

Individual departments are often headed by a commissioner.

=== Ranks ===
The rank insignia of the CPSP follows the generic model of the Portuguese Public Security Police. Insignia is placed in dark blue epaulets for all ranks, except those of superintendent and superintendent general which use instead red epaulets.

The insignia for basic ranks consist in silver chevrons: two for constable, three for constable first class and four for principal constable. The insignia for sub-chief consists in a silver stripe. The insignia for chiefs and commissioners consist of a laurel branch and a number of PSP stars (six points silver stars with the "SP" monogram in the center): one for chief, two for sub-commissioner and three (in inverted triangle) for commissioner. The insignia for intendents and superintendents consist of two crossed batons surrounded by laurel wreaths and a number of PSP stars: two for sub-intendent, three (in inverted triangle) for intendent and superintendent and four for superintendent general.

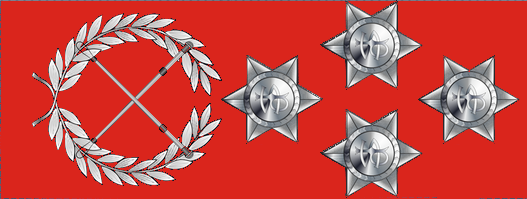
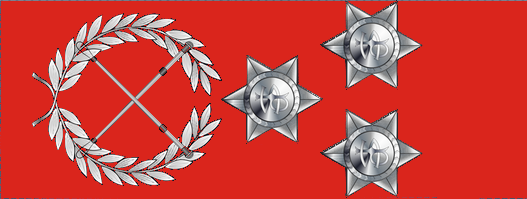
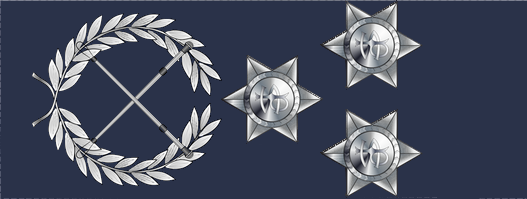
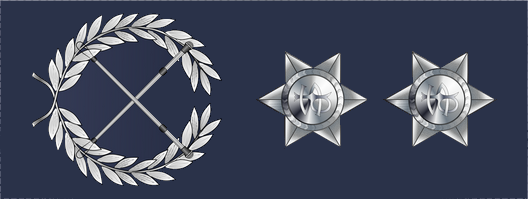
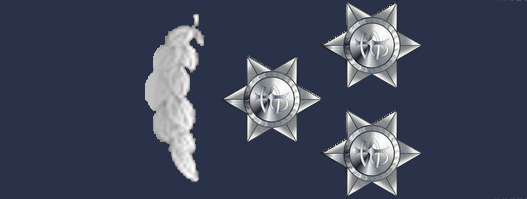
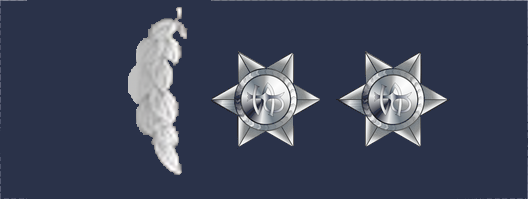
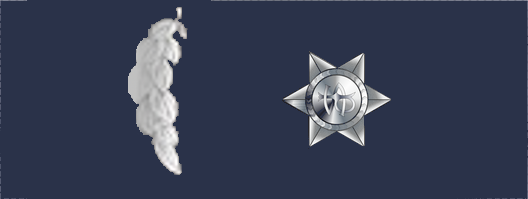
Rank group	Command and Management Cargos de comando e direcção		Officials Oficiais
Macau Public Security Police Force
Macau Public Security Police Force	Superintendente-geral	Superintendente	Intendente	Subintendente	Comissário	Subcomissário	Chefe
Macau Public Security Police Force	Commander of the CPSP and Represent CPSP	Deputy Commander of the CPSP	Commanding officer of level I units	Commanding officer of level II units	Commanding officer of level III units	Commanding officer of level IV units	Commanding officer of level V units

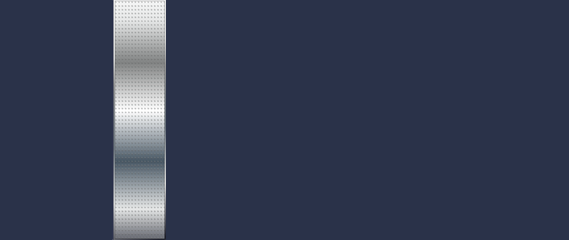
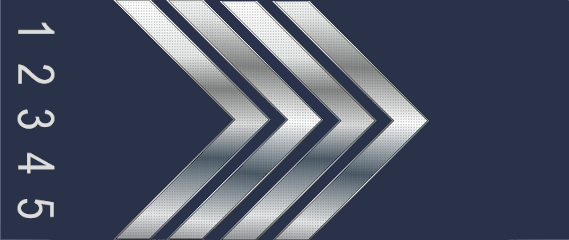
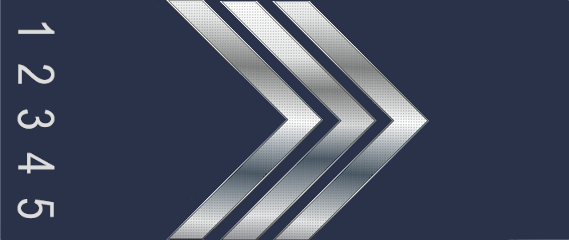
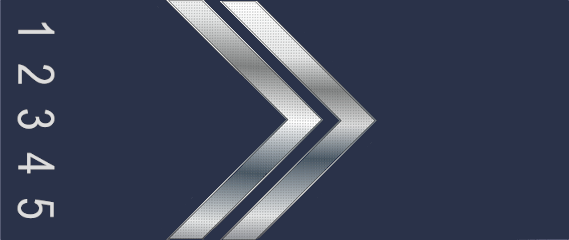
Rank group	Agents Agentes
Macau Public Security Police Force
Macau Public Security Police Force	Subchefe	Guarda principal	Guarda de primeira	Guarda
Macau Public Security Police Force	Coordinator of complex tasks	Coordinator of simple tasks	Executor of operational, technical or administrative tasks	Executor of operational, technical or administrative tasks

== Commanders ==
The following is a list of former commanders of the Public Security Police Force:

Portrait	Commander	Term start	Term end	Notes
	Bernardino de Senna Fernandes	14 October 1857	29 July 1863	
	Gaudêncio de Conceicao Tenente	16 July 1924	28 February 1931	
	Cancio José Jorge	30 September 1925	15 November 1925	
	Frederico Tamagnini de Sousa Barbosa	20 December 1929	23 May 1930	
	Major Alexandre dos Santos	1 March 1931	22 January 1937	
	Carlos de Sousa Gorgulho	5 March 1937	31 July 1939	
	Júlio Manuel de Oliveira Montalvao e Silva	1 August 1937	27 August 1939	
	Eduardo de Madureira Proença	28 August 1939	16 March 1941	
