= Macau Customs Service =

Official customs agency of Macau, China

- 澳門海關; Serviços de Alfândega de Macau
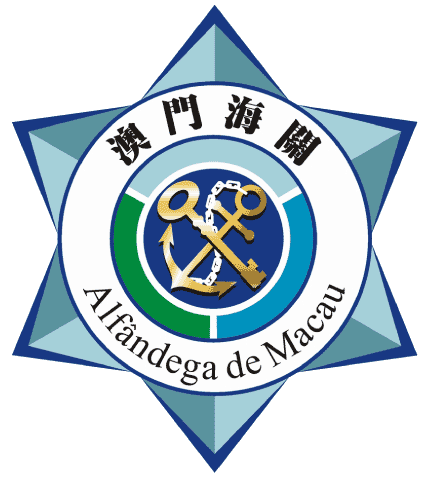
- Emblem of the Macau Customs Service

Customs agency overview
- Formed: December 20, 2001; 24 years ago
- Preceding Customs agency: Customs and Excise Service of Macau (under Portuguese rule)
- Type: Law enforcement / Border control / Coast guard
- Jurisdiction: Macau Special Administrative Region
- Status: Active
- Headquarters: Avenida do Cais de Pac On, Taipa; 22.1880°N 113.5383°E
- Secretary for Security responsible: Chan Tsz King, Secretary for Security (Macau)
- Customs agency executive: Adriano Marques Ho, Director-General of the Customs Service
- Parent department: Secretary for Security (Macau)
- Website: www.customs.gov.mo

The Macau Customs Service (MCS, also known as Customs of Macao Special Administrative Region) is the official customs agency of the Macau Special Administrative Region (SAR) of China. It is responsible for enforcing customs law, preventing smuggling, supervising cross-border trade, and cooperating in regional and international customs matters.

The agency operates under the jurisdiction of the Macau Secretariat for Security and is headed by the Director-General of Customs. It maintains checkpoints at Macau’s land borders, maritime ports, and airport, including the Border Gate, Outer Harbour Ferry Terminal, Macau International Airport, and the Macau Port Area of Hengqin Port.

The current structure of the Macau Customs Service was formally established on 20 December 2001, following the reorganization of border and customs services after the handover of Macau from Portugal to the People’s Republic of China in 1999.

== History ==
The origins of Macau’s customs operations trace back to the Colonial era, with the establishment of the Harbour Police (Maritime Police) and Customs Police under Portuguese administration in the 19th century. Over time, these evolved into the Marine and Fiscal Police and later the Maritime and Fiscal Police in 1957. Before the 1999 handover, customs duties were handled by the Macau Economic Services (MES) and the Macau Marine Police and Customs.

On 20 December 1999, shortly after Macau's handover to China, the Marine Inspection Corps were renamed Maritime Inspection Bureau, remaining under the security command structure. This change marked the beginning of a transition in customs oversight under Macau’s new governance.

With the passage of Law No. 11/2001 on 6 August 2001, the Maritime Inspection Bureau was formally reorganized and renamed the Macau Customs Service. It officially began operations on 1 November 2001, taking over all previous customs and border control functions. This legal establishment also transferred responsibilities from the Economic Affairs Bureau and the Labour Affairs Bureau related to intellectual property enforcement and labour inspection to the new customs authority.

MCS marks 6 November annually as “Customs Day,” commemorating its founding.

== Duties ==
Since its formation, Macau Customs has continuously expanded its mandate in alignment with national and international obligations, such as intellectual property protection, anti-smuggling, cross-border monetary controls, and enforcing export control regulations.

While the MCS handles customs duties for Macau, the agency also doubles as the SAR's defacto Coast guard. It also assists the Macau SAR in evacuation duties when additional manpower is needed.

== Ranks ==
MCS observes the following ranks:

- Director-General
- Deputy Director-General
- Assistant
- Customs Superintendent
- Customs Sub-Superintendent
- Customs Commissioner
- Customs Sub-Commissioner
- Senior Customs Inspector
- Customs Inspector
- Customs Sub-Inspector
- Chief Customs Inspector
- First Customs Inspector
- Customs Inspector

== Gallery ==
Macau Customs Service in action

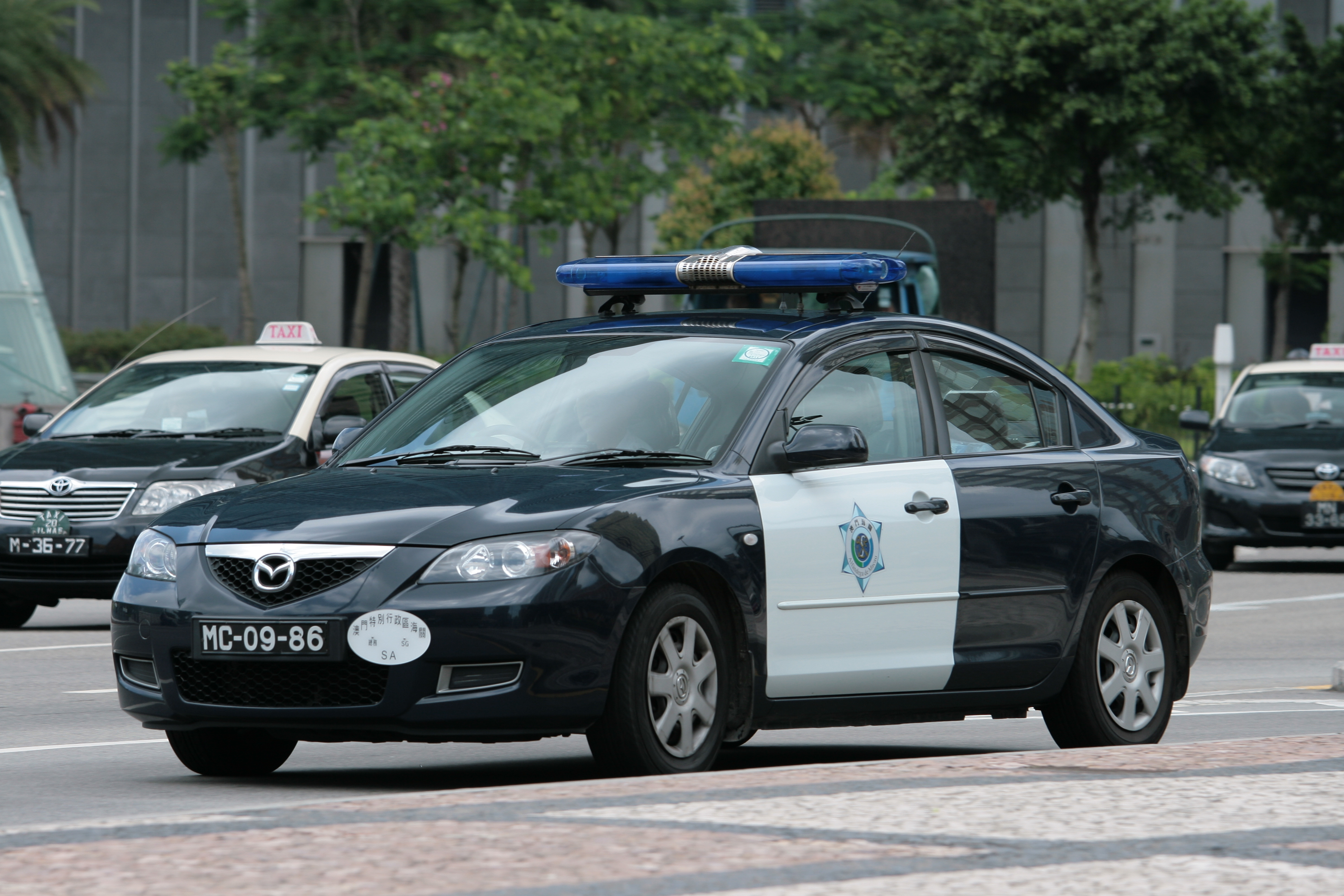
A Mazda patrol vehicle operated by Macau Customs Service.

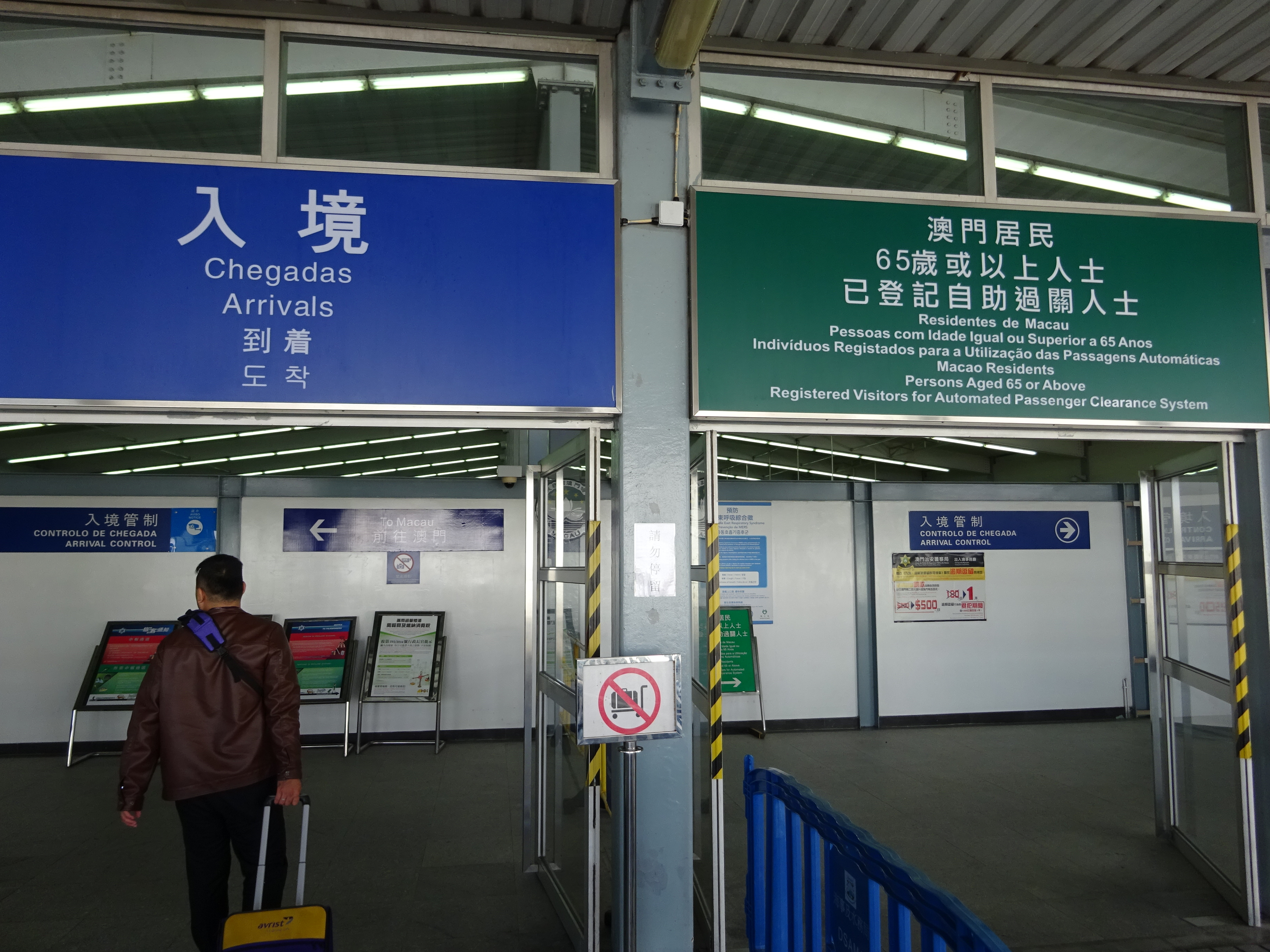
Customs inspection signage at Taipa Ferry Terminal, a major maritime entry point.

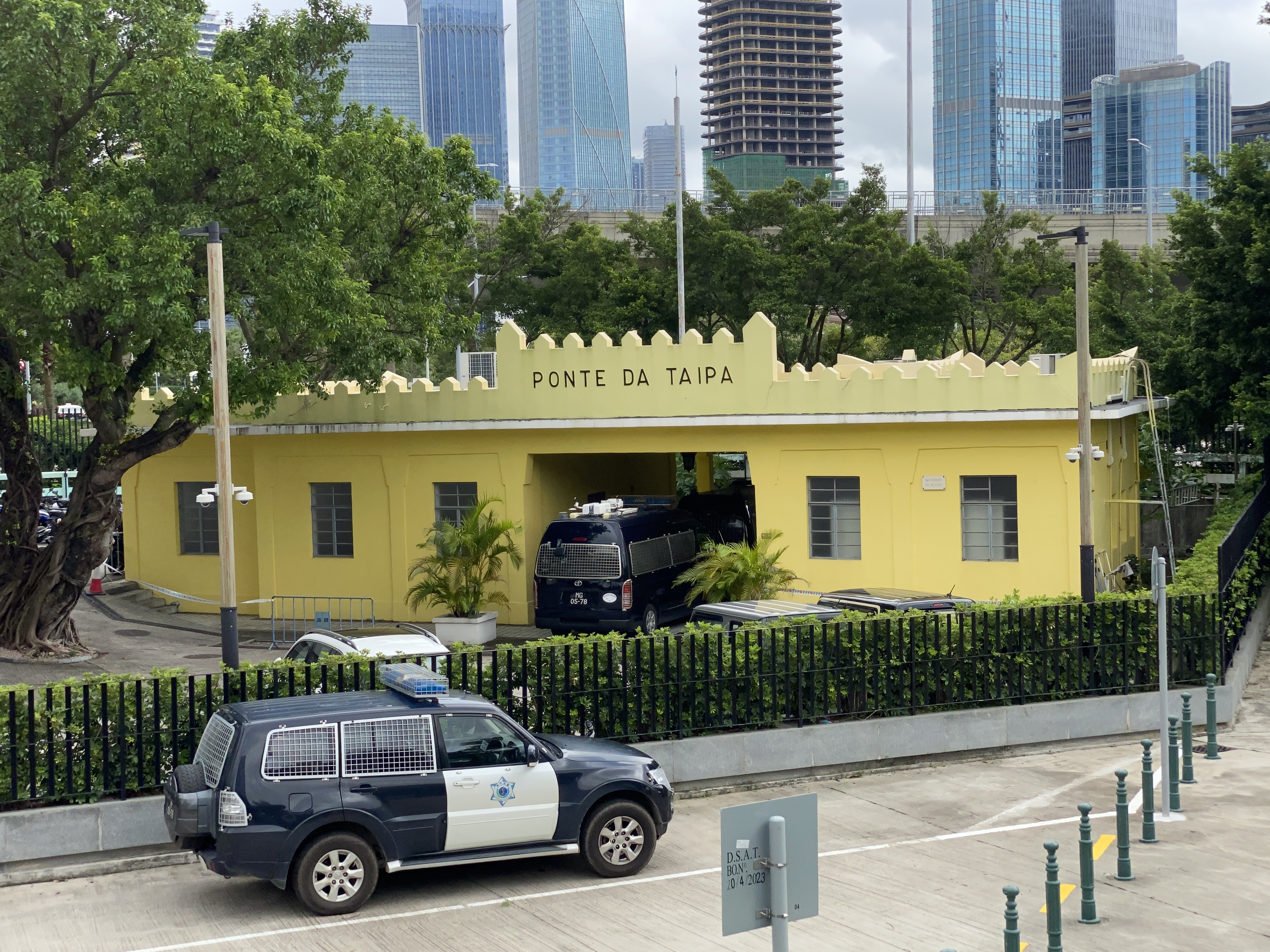
Taipa Bridge, frequently patrolled by Macau Customs for vehicle inspections.

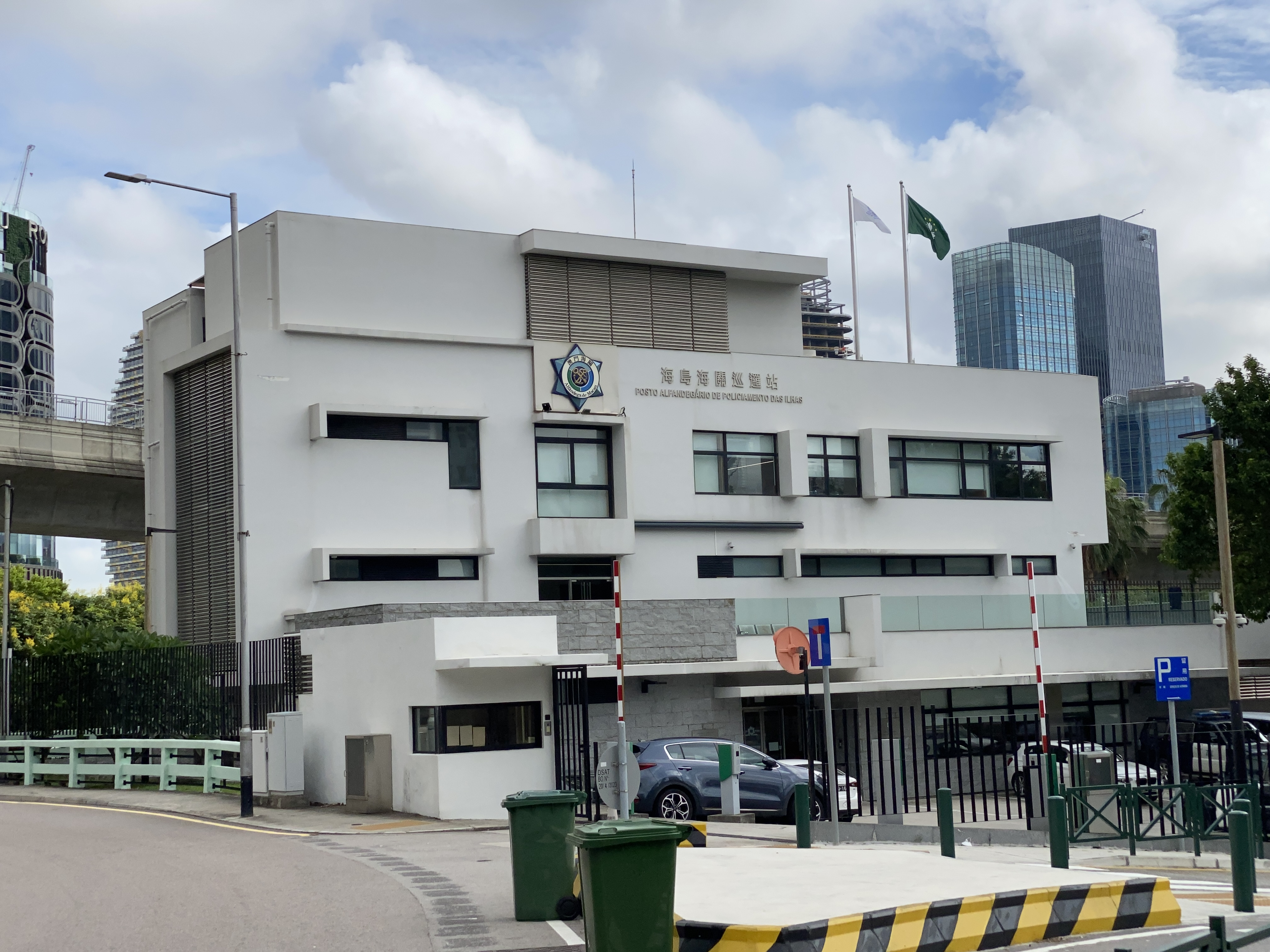
Customs enforcement post in the Islands District of Macau.
