= Wong Sio Chak =

Macau politician

- 黃少澤

Secretary for Security of Macau
- Incumbent
- Assumed office 20 December 2014
- Chief Executive: Fernando Chui; Ho Iat Seng; Sam Hou Fai
- Preceded by: Cheong Kuoc Vá

Personal details
- Born: September 1968 (age 58) Guangdong, China
- Education: Peking University
- Occupation: Civil servant

Wong Sio Chak (Chinese: 黃少澤; born September 1968) is a Macau politician who is the current Secretary for Security of Macau, fourth most senior government official in Macau.

== Early life ==
Wong was born in Guangdong province in September 1968. He received a bachelor's and doctorate degrees in law from Peking University.

== Careers ==
Working at the Judicial Police, Wong was a senior technician in 1994 and judicial auditor in 1994-1995. In 1997, he was appointed prosecutor at the Prosecution Service. At the Judiciary Police, he was appointed as Deputy Director in 1998 and acting Director in 1999. He was appointed Deputy Prosecutor-General of the Public Prosecution Office in March 2000 and appointed Director of Judiciary Police in November 2000.

== Personal life ==
Wong is married with two daughters.

Preceded by Cheong Kuoc Vá	Secretary for Security of Macau; 2014-	Succeeded by Incumbent
