= Secretary for Security (Macau) =

Chinese government department director

- Chinese: 保安司
Transcriptions
Standard Mandarin
- Hanyu Pinyin: Bǎo'ān Sī
Yue: Cantonese
- Yale Romanization: Bóu'ōn Sī
- Jyutping: bou2 on1 si1

The Secretary for Security (Chinese: 保安司司长; Portuguese: Secretaria para a Segurança) is the director of the government department responsible for public safety and security in Macau. The role replaced the former post of Secretary for Public Security. It is responsible for managing the Macau public security and police agencies.

== Subordinate entities ==
The following entities are controlled under the MSF:

- Unitary Police Services
  - Public Security Police Force
    - Immigration Department of the Macao Special Administrative Region is a sub unit under Public Security Police Force
  - Directorate of Judiciary Police
- Public Security Forces Affairs Bureau
- Correctional Services Bureau
- Fire Services Bureau
- Academy for Public Security Forces
- Macau Customs Service

== List of Secretariats ==
No.	Name	Assumed office	Left office	Term
1	Cheong Kuoc Vá 張國華	20 December 1999	20 December 2004	1
1	Cheong Kuoc Vá 張國華	20 December 2004	20 December 2009	2
1	Cheong Kuoc Vá 張國華	20 December 2009	20 December 2014	3
2	Wong Sio Chak 黃少澤	20 December 2014	20 December 2019	4
2	Wong Sio Chak 黃少澤	20 December 2019	20 December 2024	5
2	Wong Sio Chak 黃少澤	20 December 2024	16 October 2025	6
3	Chan Tsz King 陳子勁	16 October 2025	Incumbent; Term ends on 20 December 2029	6

=== Commissioners ===
- José Proença Branco - Unitary Police Service
- Chôi Lai Hang - Director General of the Macau Custom Service
  - Lai Man Wa - Deputy Director General of the Customs Service
- Lei Siu Peng - Public Security Police
  - Ma Io Kun - Deputy Commissioner Public Security Police
  - Lei Man Kim - Deputy Commissioner Public Security Police
- Wong Sio Chak - Director, Judiciary Police
  - Cheong Ioc Iong - Deputy Director, Judiciary Police
  - João Augusto da Rosa, Judiciary Police
- Lee Kam Cheong - Director, Macau Prison
- Loi Kam Wan - Commissioner of Macau Fire Service
  - Eurico Lopes Fazenda - Deputy Commissioner Macau Fire Service
  - Lei Pun Chi - Deputy Commissioner Macau Fire Service

== Office of the Secretary for Security ==
The Secretariat's offices are located at the former San Francisco Barracks located near to what is now S. Francisco Garden.

=== Chief of Office ===
- Vong Chun Fat
