= Wallace fountain =

Parisian drinking fountain

Wallace fountains
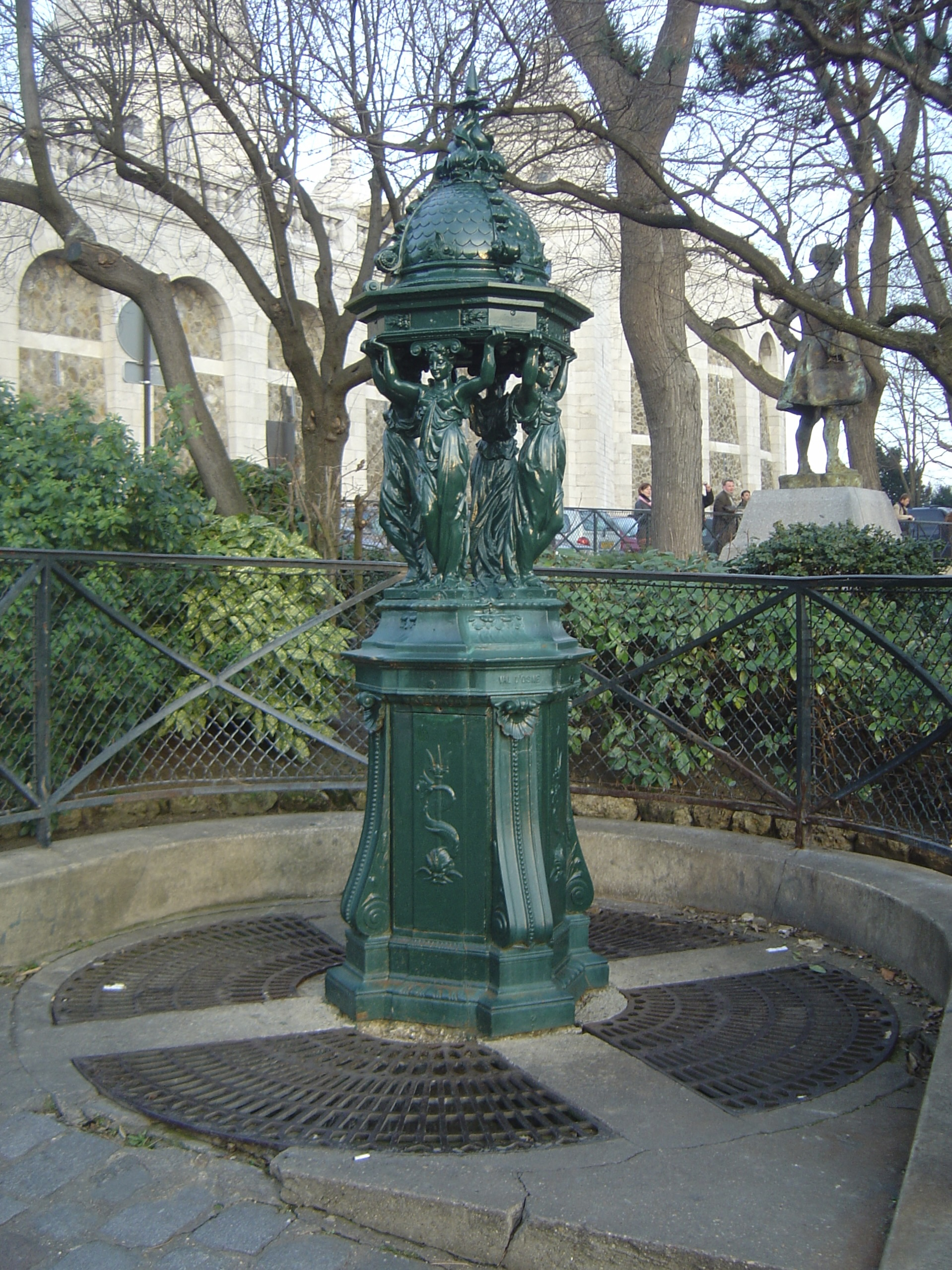
- A Wallace fountain located in the Montmartre district of Paris
- Designer: Charles-Auguste Lebourg
- Material: Cast iron
- Beginning date: 1872
- Dedicated to: Richard Wallace

Wallace fountains are public drinking fountains named after, financed by and roughly designed by Sir Richard Wallace and sculpted by Charles-Auguste Lebourg. They are large cast-iron sculptures scattered throughout the city of Paris, France, mainly along the most-frequented sidewalks. A great aesthetic success, they are recognized worldwide as one of the symbols of Paris. A Wallace fountain can be seen outside the Wallace Collection in London, the gallery that houses the works of art collected by Sir Richard Wallace and the first four Marquesses of Hertford.

== Sir Richard Wallace ==
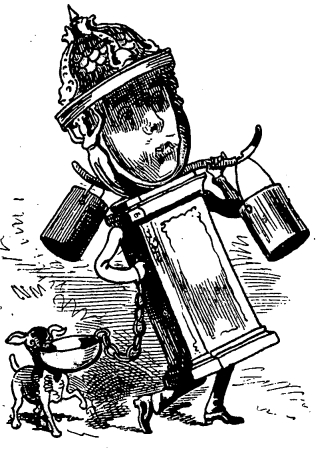
Sir Richard Wallace caricatured as a Wallace fountain, by Georges Lafosse published in Le Trombinoscope

Sir Richard Wallace (1818–1890) was an eclectic and reserved philanthropist. Having inherited a large fortune from his father in August 1870, he decided that all Parisians should profit from it, which made him popular. Wallace's devotion led him to remain in his Parisian villa even as the city was besieged, rather than take refuge on one of his palatial estates, so as to be in Paris when he was needed.

He founded a hospital, where he personally welcomed victims of the bombings and distributed supplies, among his other efforts on behalf of Parisians at war. He remained faithful to his adopted nation, France, and is buried at Père Lachaise Cemetery.

Of his numerous contributions to Parisian heritage, the best known today are the fountains which bear his name.

== Purpose ==
As a result of the siege of Paris and the Commune episode, many aqueducts had been destroyed, and the price of water, already higher than normal, increased considerably. Because of this, most of the poor had to pay for water. Moreover, most of the water provided by vendors was drawn from the Seine river and was likely to be dirty, as run-off from streets and many of sewers drained into it. Hence it was safer to drink beer or other alcoholic beverages, which were almost as cheap as water. The temptation to take to liquor was strong among the lower classes, and it was considered a moral duty to keep them from falling into alcoholism. Even today, when water and hygiene are not a problem for the majority of Parisians, these fountains are often the only sources of free water for the homeless.

The poor are not the only beneficiaries of these installations. Even if the aim of the fountains was to allow people of modest means to have access to drinking water, they are not the only ones who use them. Anyone passing by may quench his thirst, fulfilling this vital need. There was already a programme of constructing temperance fountains in both the United States and in the United Kingdom.

Not only did the fountains accomplish Wallace's philosophy of helping the needy, but they also beautified Paris.

== Conception ==
Interactive 3D model of a Wallace fountain (large model at Parc des Bastions, Geneva, Switzerland)

Richard Wallace intended the fountains to be beautiful as well as useful. The fountains had to meet several strict guidelines:

- Height: They had to be tall enough to be seen from afar but not so tall as to destroy the harmony of the surrounding landscape.
- Form: Both practical to use and pleasing to the eye.
- Price: Affordable enough to allow the installation of dozens.
- Materials: Resistant to the elements, easy to shape, and simple to maintain.

The locations, as well as the color (a dark green, like all urban development of that era, in order to blend in with the parks and tree-lined avenues), were quickly chosen by the city government.

Wallace created two different models, which were followed by two additional models, thus there were four types of Wallace fountains varying in such properties as height and motif. They were made of cast iron. Inexpensive, easy to mold, and robust, it was one of the most popular materials of the age. The majority of the cost was paid for by Wallace. The city of Paris allocated 1,000 francs for the large model and 450 francs for the wall-mounted model.

The fountains are still cast by the historical foundry G.H.M..

== Sculptor ==
Wishing that his project be completed as rapidly as possible, Wallace called on Charles-Auguste Lebourg, a sculptor from Nantes whom he knew and whose talents were already renowned. Lebourg improved Wallace's sketches, already studied and thought-provoking, to make the fountains true works of art.

For the large model, Lebourg created four caryatids representing kindness, simplicity, charity and sobriety. Each one is different from her sisters, by the way she bends her knees and where her tunic is tucked into her blouse.

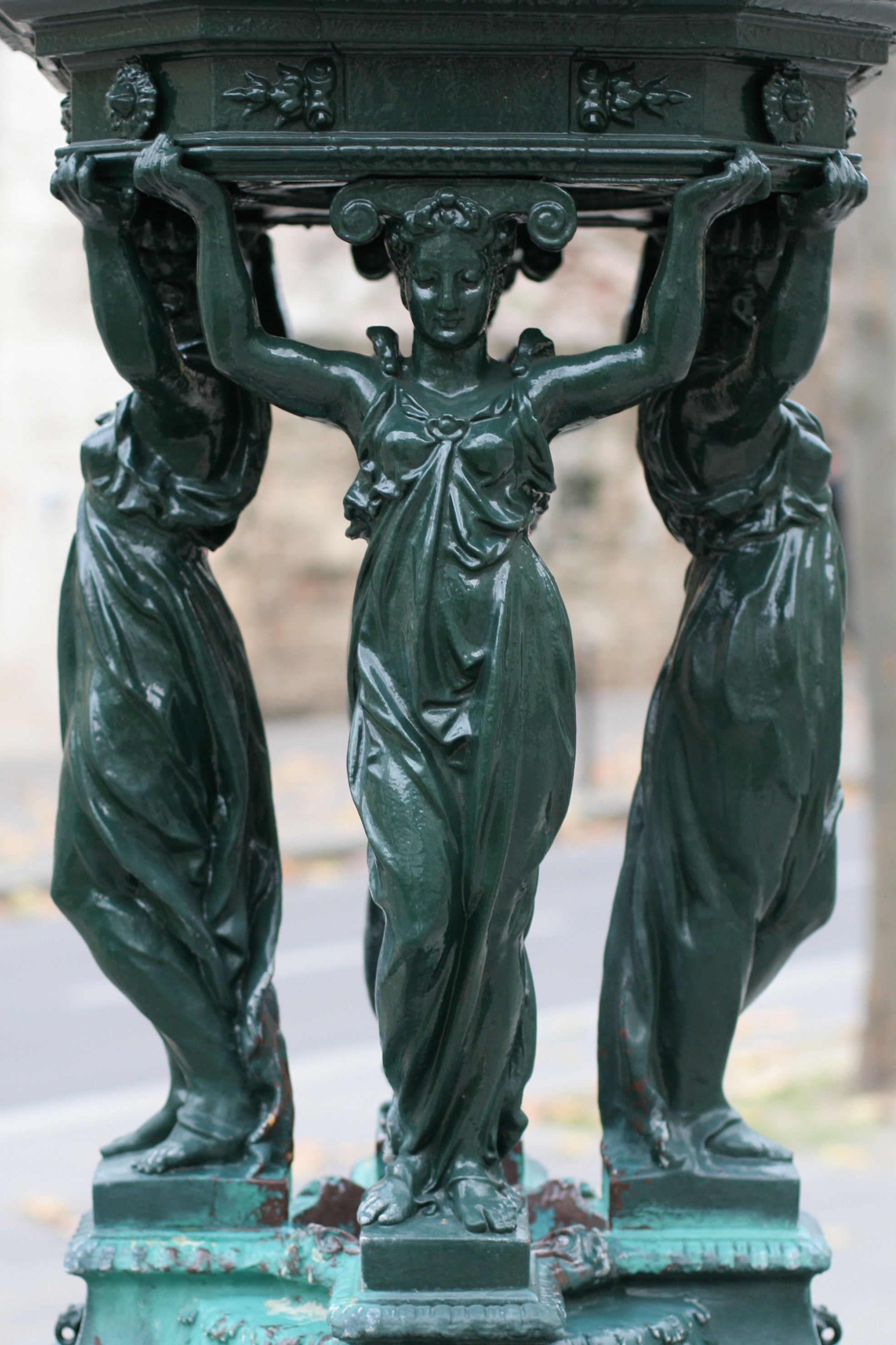
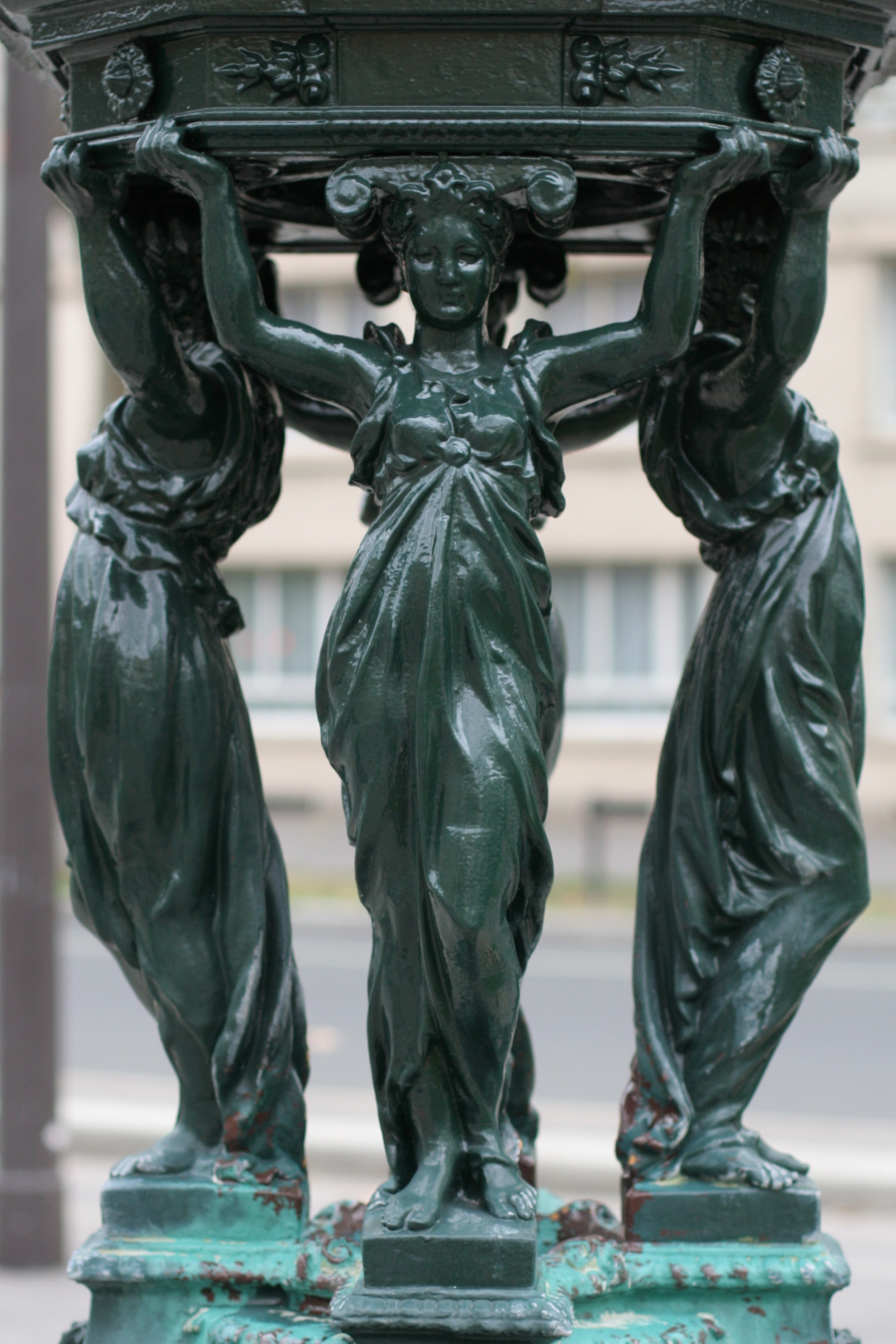
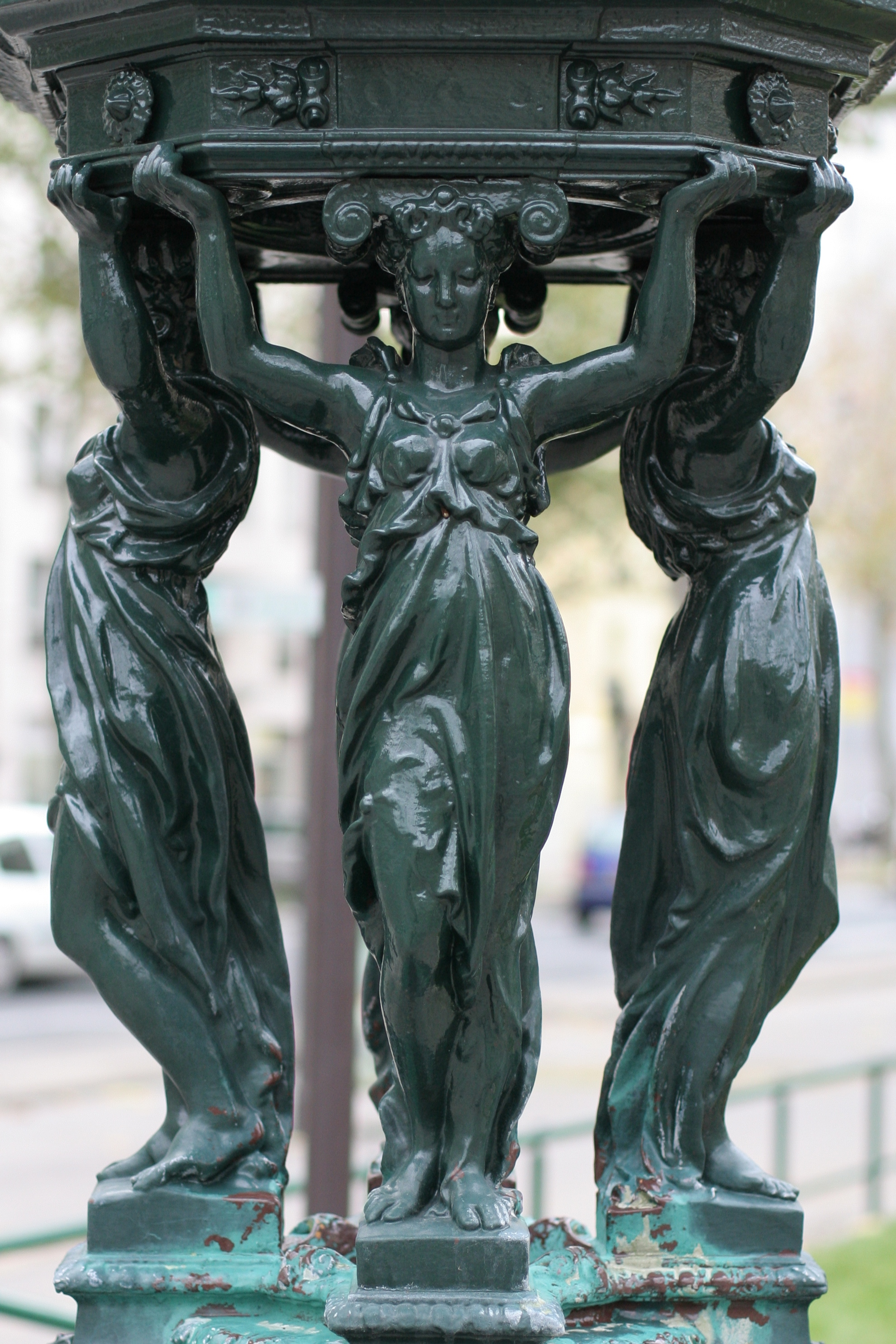
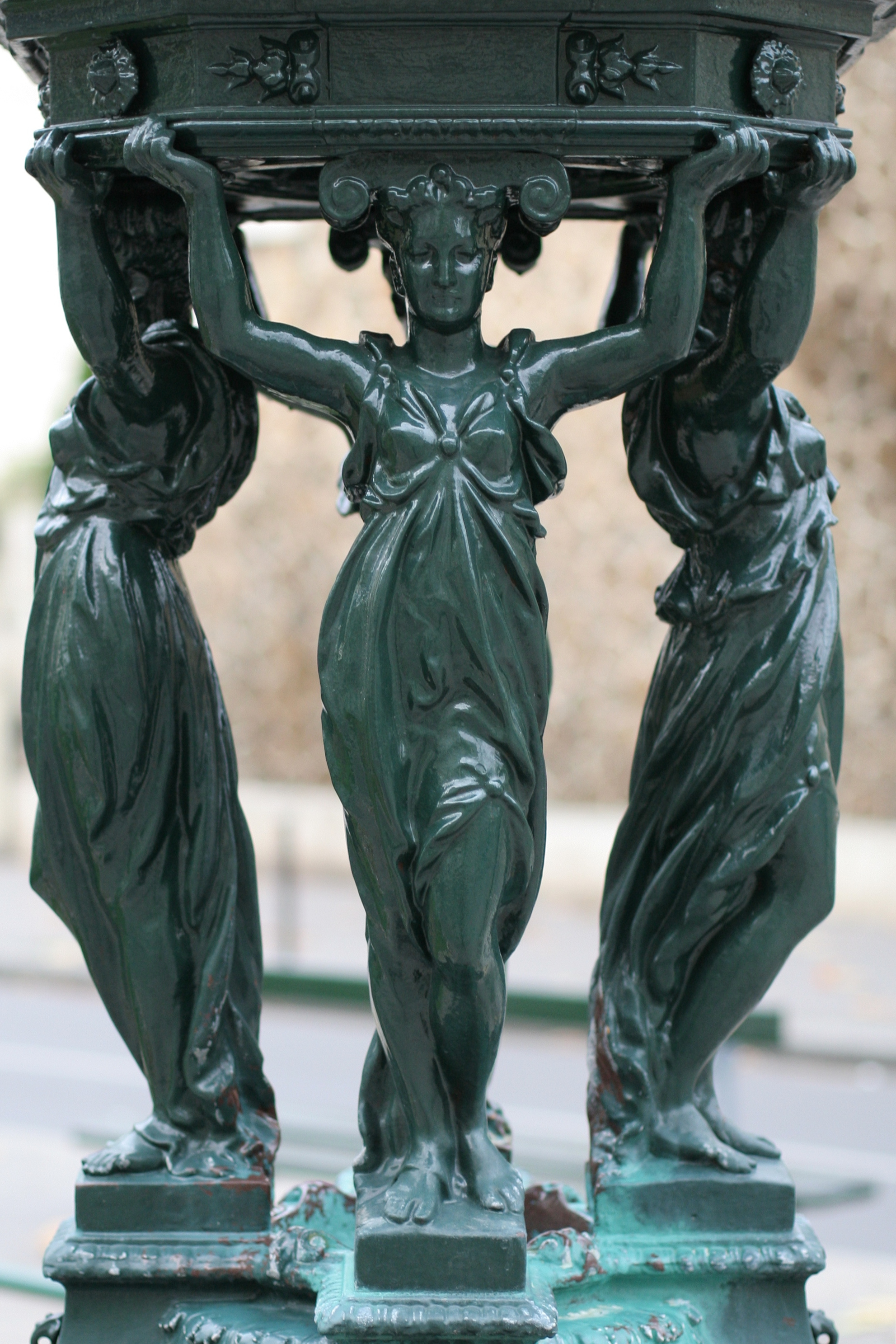
The four caryatids

== Different models ==
The first two models (large model and applied model) were conceived and financed by Sir Richard Wallace. The two other models were created following the success of their predecessors inspired by the same styles and the resemblance is obvious. The more recent designs are not as strongly steeped in Wallace's aesthetic ideals, that in true Renaissance style, they should be useful, beautiful, and symbolic, in addition to being real works of art.

=== Large model ===
(size: 2.71 m, 610 kg)

The large model was conceived by Sir Richard Wallace, and was inspired by the Fontaine des Innocents. On a foundation of Hauteville stone rests an octagonal pedestal on which four caryatids are affixed with their backs turned and their arms supporting a pointed dome decorated by dolphins.

The water is distributed in a slender trickle issuing from the center of the dome and falls down into a basin that is protected by a grille. To make distribution easier, two tin-plated, iron cups attached to the fountain by a small chain were at the drinker's desire, staying always submerged for cleanliness. These cups were removed in 1952 "for Hygiene reasons" by demand of the Council of Public Hygiene of the old Department of the Seine.

For more information, see the Technical File (in French).

=== Wall-mounted model ===
(size: 1.96 m, 300 kg)

Sir Richard's other model. In the middle of a semi-circular pediment, the head of a naiad issues a trickle of water that falls into a basin resting between two pilasters. Two goblets allowed the water to be drunk, but they were retired under the 1952 law cited above. This model, costing little to install, was to have been many units along the lengths of the walls of buildings with strong humanitarian focus, e.g. hospitals. This was not the case, and they do not remain today except for one situated on the Rue Geoffroy Saint-Hilaire.

=== Small model ===
(size: 1.32 m, 130 kg)

These are simple pushbutton fountains that one can find in squares and public gardens and are marked with the Parisian Seal (although the one installed on the Place des Invalides lacks this seal). They are familiar to mothers who bring their children to play in the many small parks in Paris.

Measuring only 4'-3" and weighing 286 lbs., they were commissioned by the mayor of Paris more frequently than its older sister models.

=== Colonnade model ===
(size: 2.50 m, a little more than 500 kg)

This model was the last to be realized. The general shape resembles that of the Large Model and the caryatids were replaced with small columns to reduce the cost of fabrication. The dome was also less pointy and the lower part more curved.

Although 30 of these were made, today there remain only two, one on the Rue de Rémusat and the other on the Avenue des Ternes.

The four models of Wallace fountains

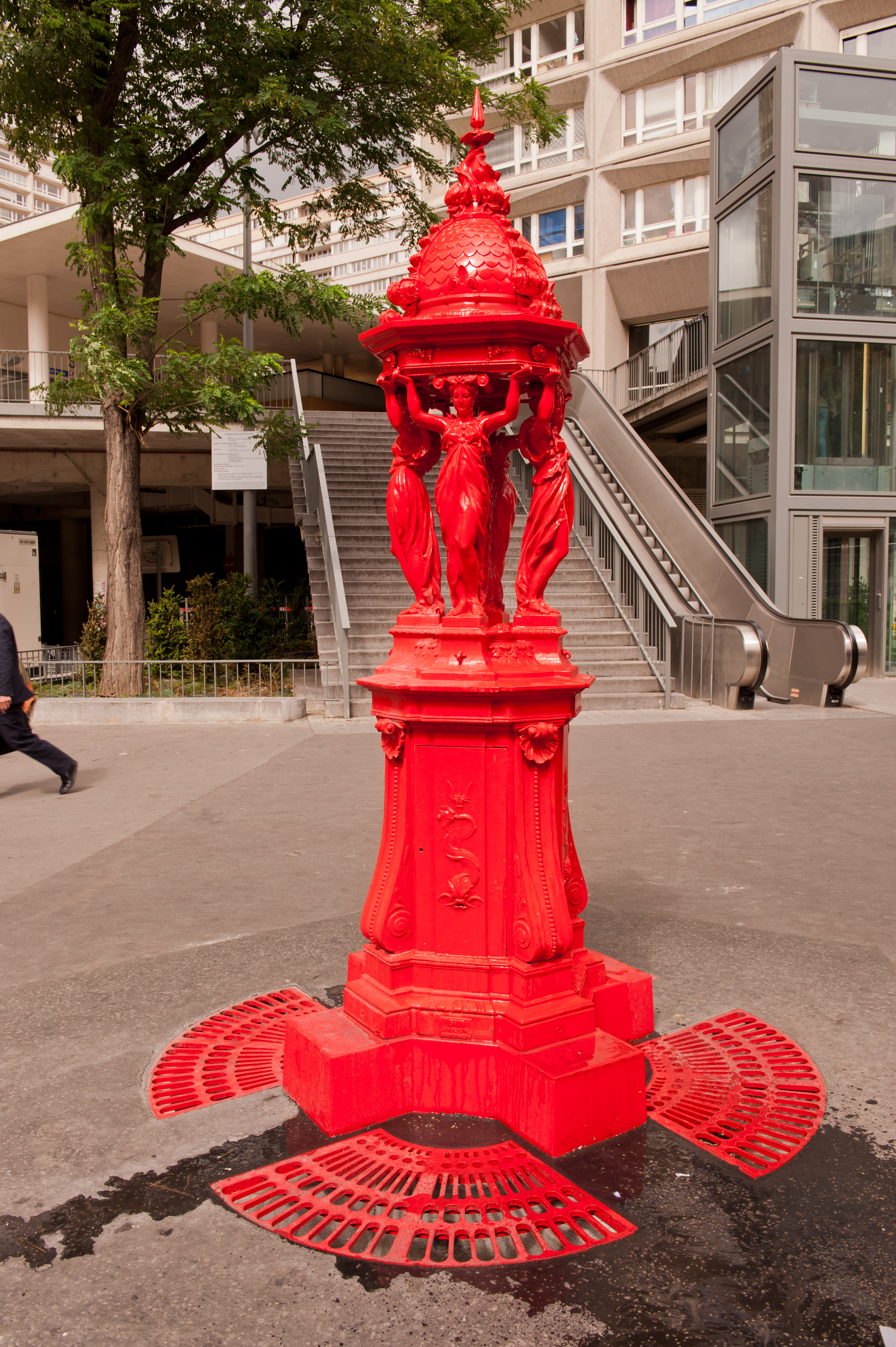
A large model painted red on the Avenue d'Ivry

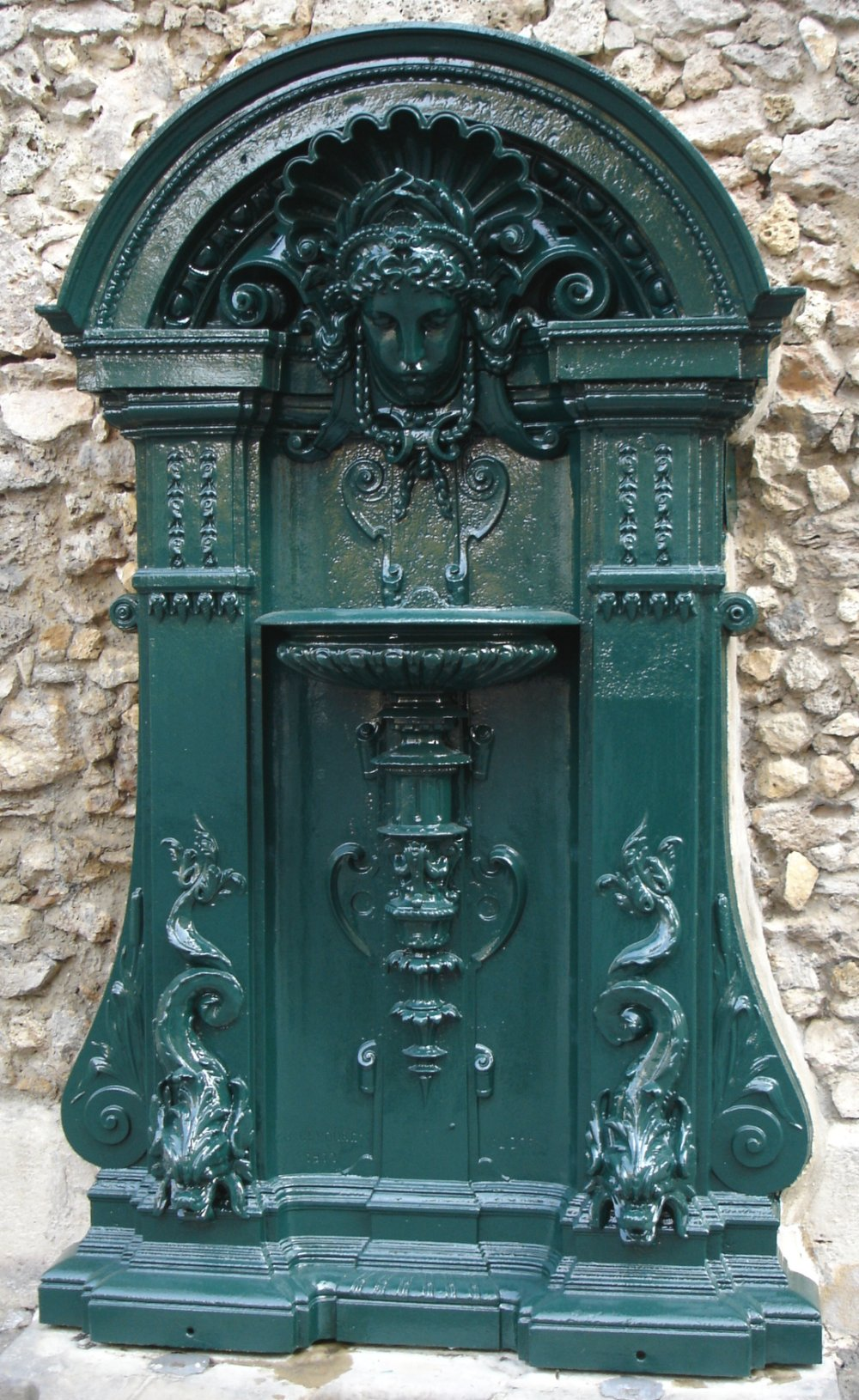
The wall-mounted model

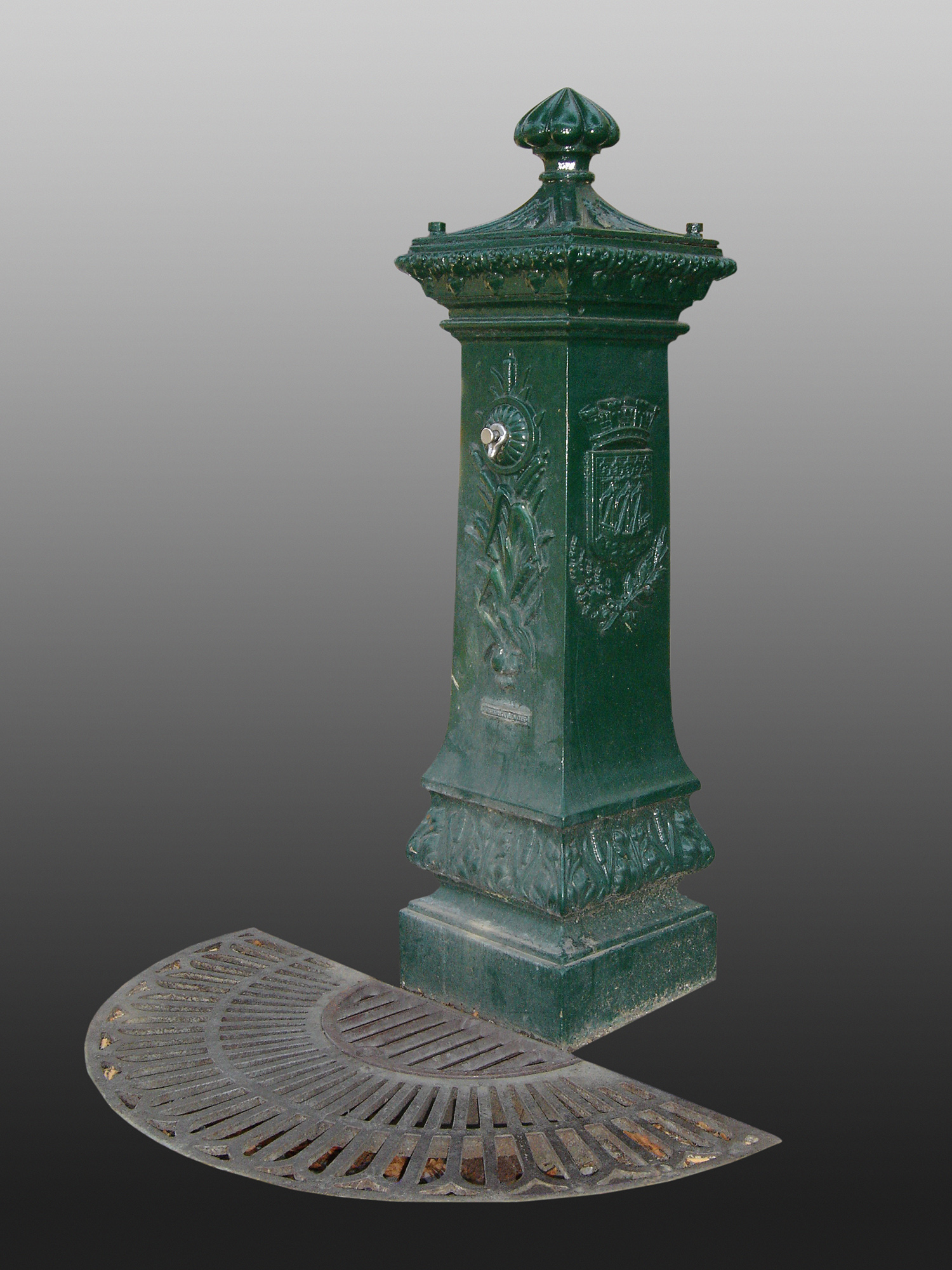
The small model

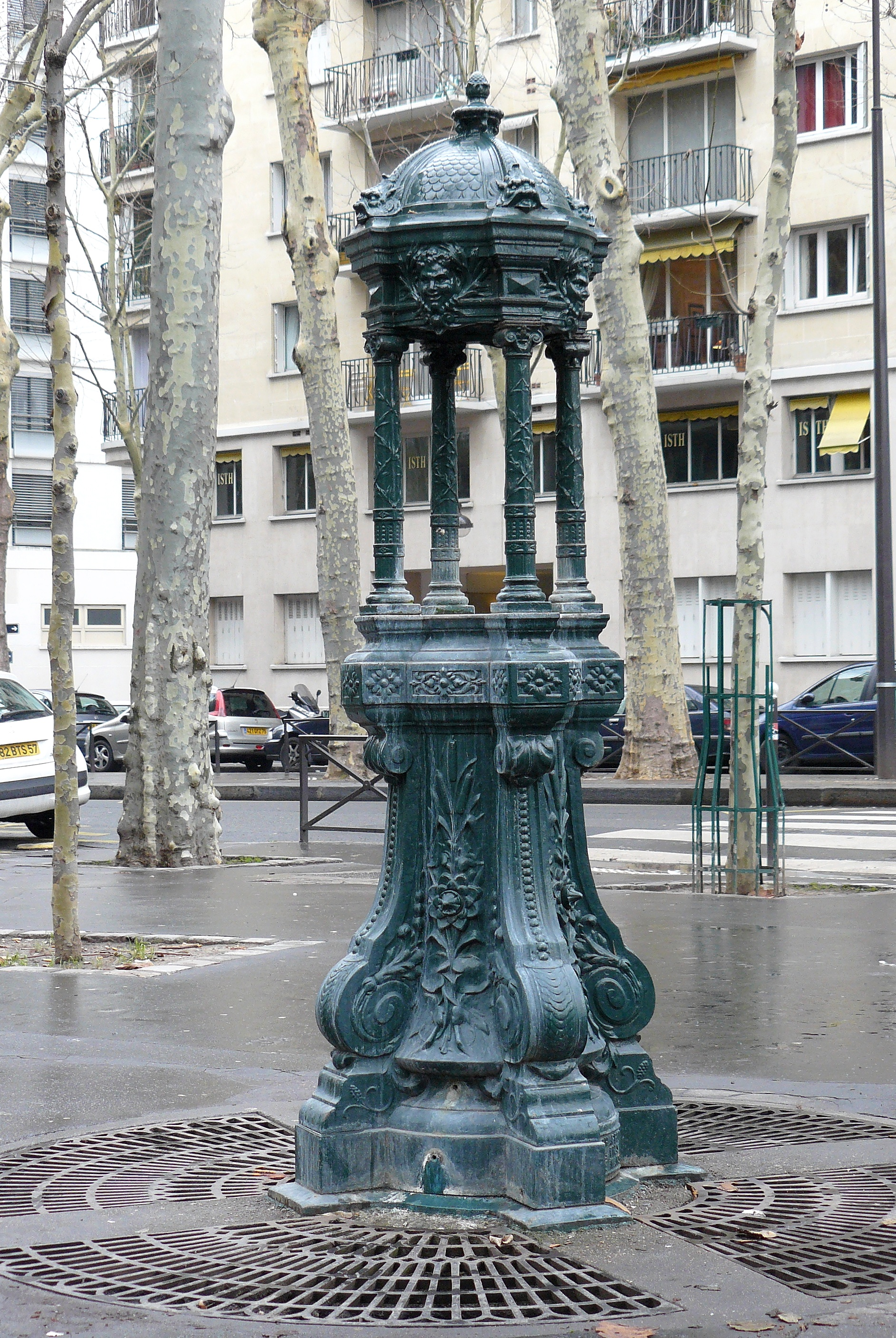
The colonnade model

== Placement ==
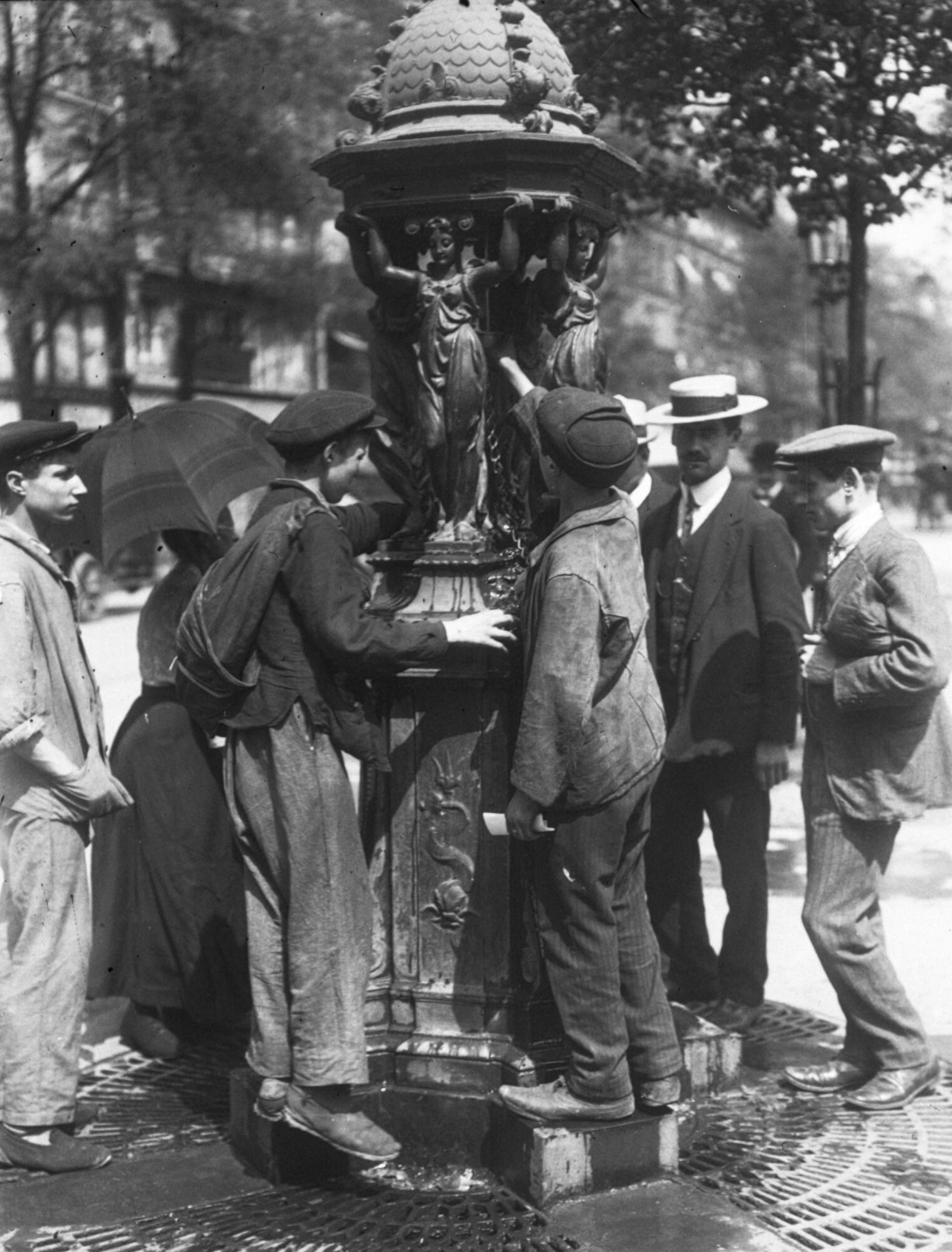
People drinking from a Wallace fountain during Bastille Day celebrations in 1911

The choice of the location of the fountains was left to the city of Paris. They needed to be placed at the will of the public in a practical manner and integrated in the most harmonious fashion with the environment. Most were placed in squares or at the intersections of two roads. The responsibility for choosing such locations fell to Eugene Belgrand, a hydraulic engineer and Director of Water and Sewers of Paris who worked with the prefect Georges-Eugène Haussmann.

== Today ==
Majority of the 100 large-model Wallace fountains currently in Paris remain operational and distribute potable water. Originally established to provide free drinking water to lower-income and unhoused residents, the fountains are now part of a network of more than 1,200 public water points managed by the municipal water provider, Eau de Paris.

The fountains work from March 15 to November 15 (the risk of freezing during the months of winter would imperil the internal plumbing), are regularly maintained and are repainted every few years.

They are an integral part of the Parisian landscape, of the same importance as the Eiffel Tower or the street urchins of Montmartre.

In Amélie, the cinegraphic piece about the glory of Parisian folklore, Jean-Pierre Jeunet baptised a personality Madeleine Wallace (she cried like a madeleine, or like a Wallace fountain), although the English subtitled version renamed the character of Madeleine, to Madeleine Wells for cultural understanding.

Wallace fountains have been a beloved part of the Paris streetscape for almost 150 years. However, only two Wallace fountains, both located in the Place Louis Lépine, are classified as registered historic monuments.

In 2018, the Society of the Wallace Fountains (La Société des Fontaines Wallace) was registered in France as an international, non-profit association governed by the French law of July 1901. The Society's purpose is education and information. Its mission is to promote, preserve and protect the Wallace fountains for future generation. In addition, the Society recognizes and encourages partnerships for the common good in the spirit of Sir Richard Wallace.

== Locations ==
=== Paris (2024) ===
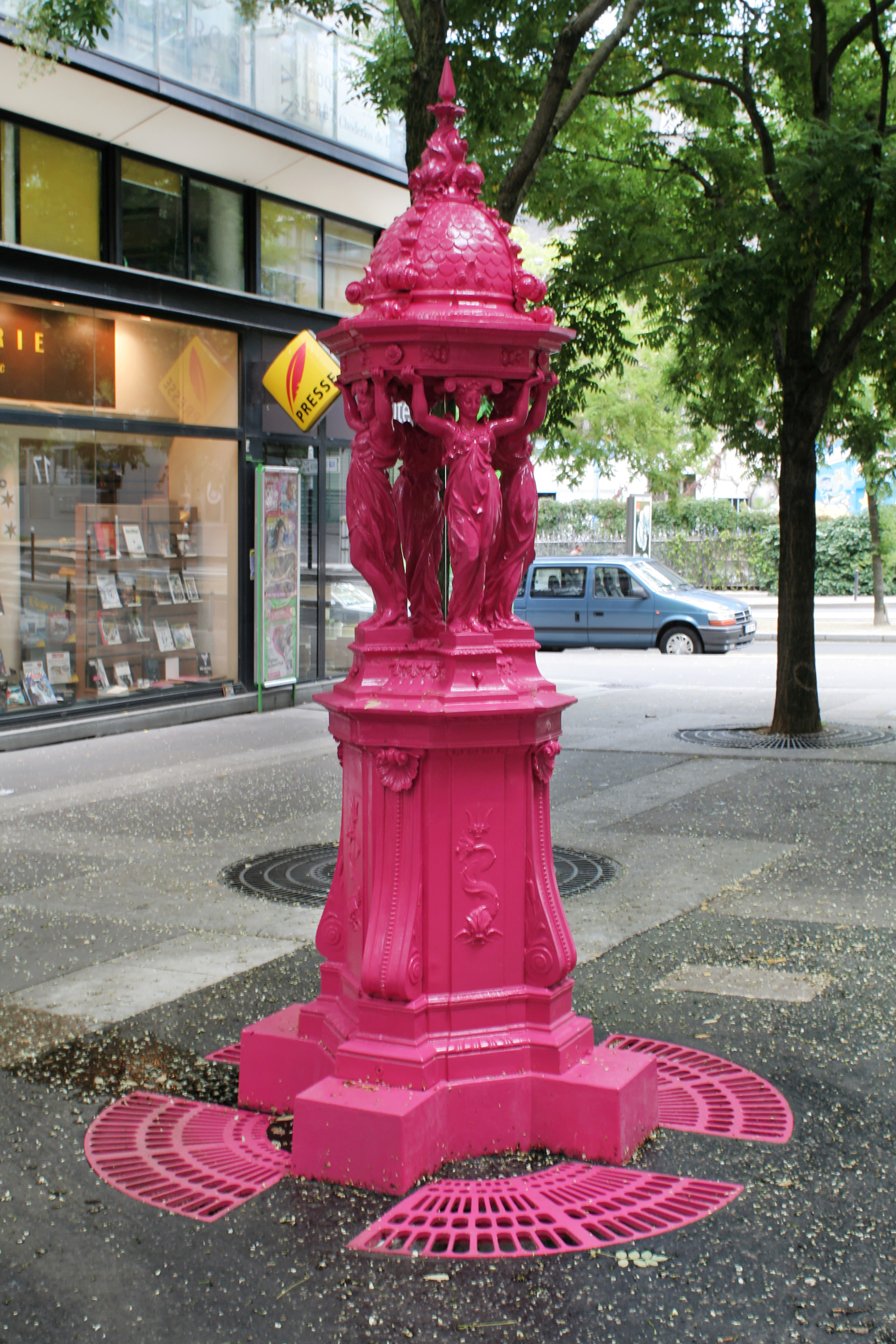
A large model on the Rue Jean-Anouilh

==== Large fountains ====
2nd arrondissement

- Rue Saint-Spire, Rue d'Alexandrie

3rd arrondissement

- Boulevard de Sébastopol, Square Chautemps
- Passage du Pont aux biches
- Rue de la corderie, Place Nathalie Lemel

4th arrondissement

- Place Louis Lépine, next to the Chambre de Commerce
- Place Louis Lépine, next to the Hôtel-dieu
- 7, boulevard du Palais
- 123, rue Saint-Antoine / 1, rue de Rivoli
- Rue Grenier sur l'Eau / Allée des Justes
- Square Saint-Gilles-Grand-Veneur
- Musée Carnavalet (non operational?)
- Rue du Temple (no 16)

5th arrondissement

- Rue Poliveau, face Rue de l'Essai
- Place Maubert (fountain removed)
- 37, rue de la Bûcherie
- Rue des Patriarches / Place Bernard Halpern
- Rue de l'Estrapade / Rue Thouin
- Rue Geoffroy Saint Hilarie / Rue Poliveau
- Rue Saint-Jacques (322)

6th arrondissement

- Place Saint-Germain-des-Prés
- Place Saint-Sulpice
- Pont Neuf, Quai des Grands Augustins
- Rue Vavin, at the Rue Bréa
- Place Saint-André-des-Arts
- Place du 18-Juin-1940

7th arrondissement

- Musée des Égouts, Pont de l'Alma (non operational?)

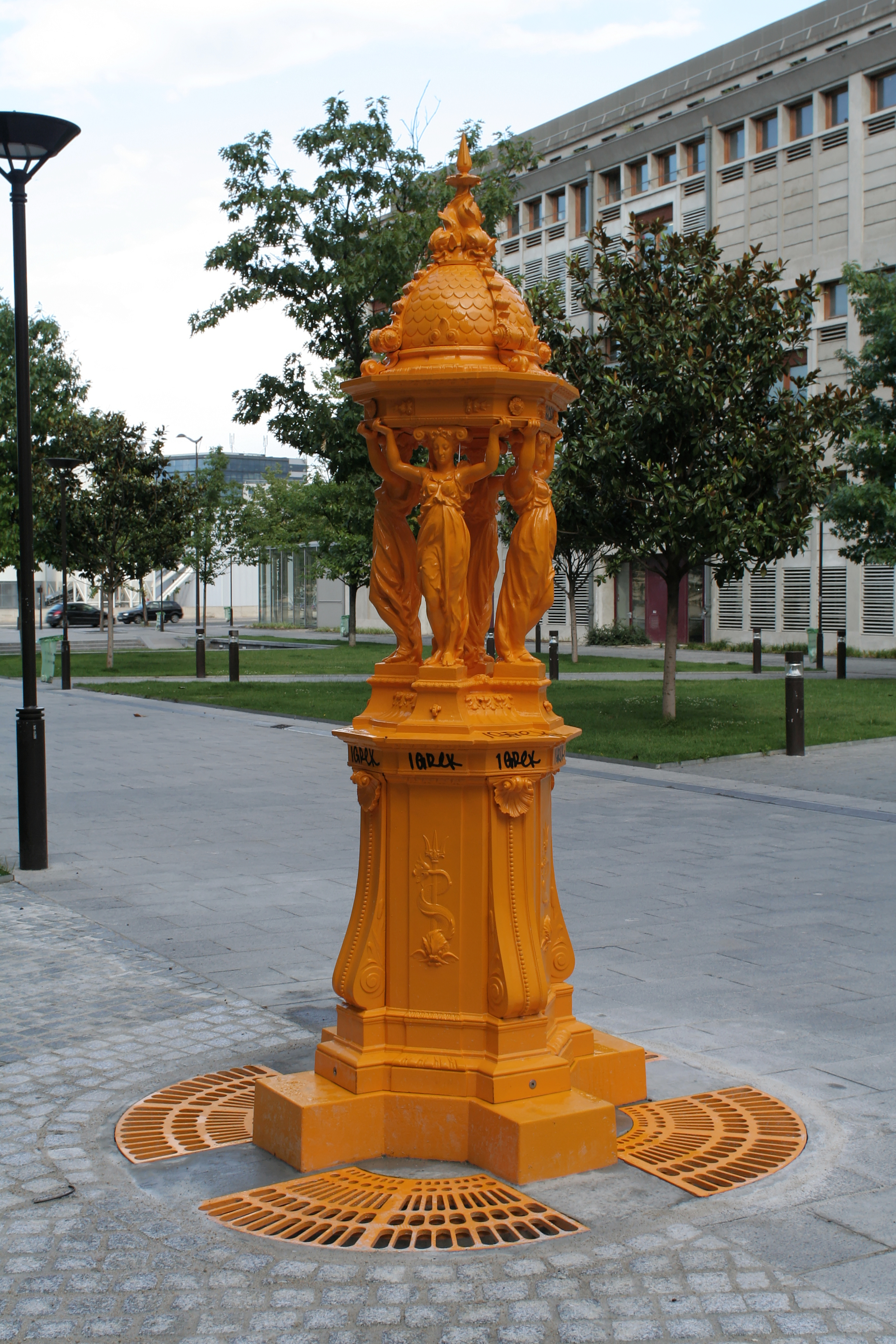
A large model at the Esplanade Pierre-Vidal-Naquet

8th arrondissement

- Rue de St-Pétersbourg, at the Rue de Turin
- Av. des Champs-Élysées, Chevaux de Marly (north side)
- Av. des Champs-Élysées, Chevaux de Marly (south side)
- 82 avenue Marceau

9th arrondissement

- Place Gustave Toudouze
- Place de Budapest
- Rue Bourdalue

10th arrondissement

- Place Juliette Dodu
- Place Jacques Bonsergent
- Place Robert Desnos
- Marché Saint-Quentin (interior)

11th arrondissement

- 143, rue de la Roquette
- 197, boulevard Voltaire
- 44, rue Jean-Pierre Timbaud
- 94, rue Jean-Pierre Timbaud
- 1, boulevard Richard Lenoir
- 89, boulevard Richard Lenoir
- Boulevard de Belleville / Rue Étienne Dolet

12th arrondissement

- Rue de Charenton / Boulevard Diderot
- Cours de Vincennes, face Blvd de Picpus
- Angle de St-Mandé, at the Rue du Rendez-vous
- Rue Descot, Square E Thomas, face Mairie du XIIe arrondissement
- Rue de Montempoivre / Rue de la Vega
- Avenue Lamoricière / Rue Fernand Foureau
- Avenue Daumesnil / Rue de Charenton

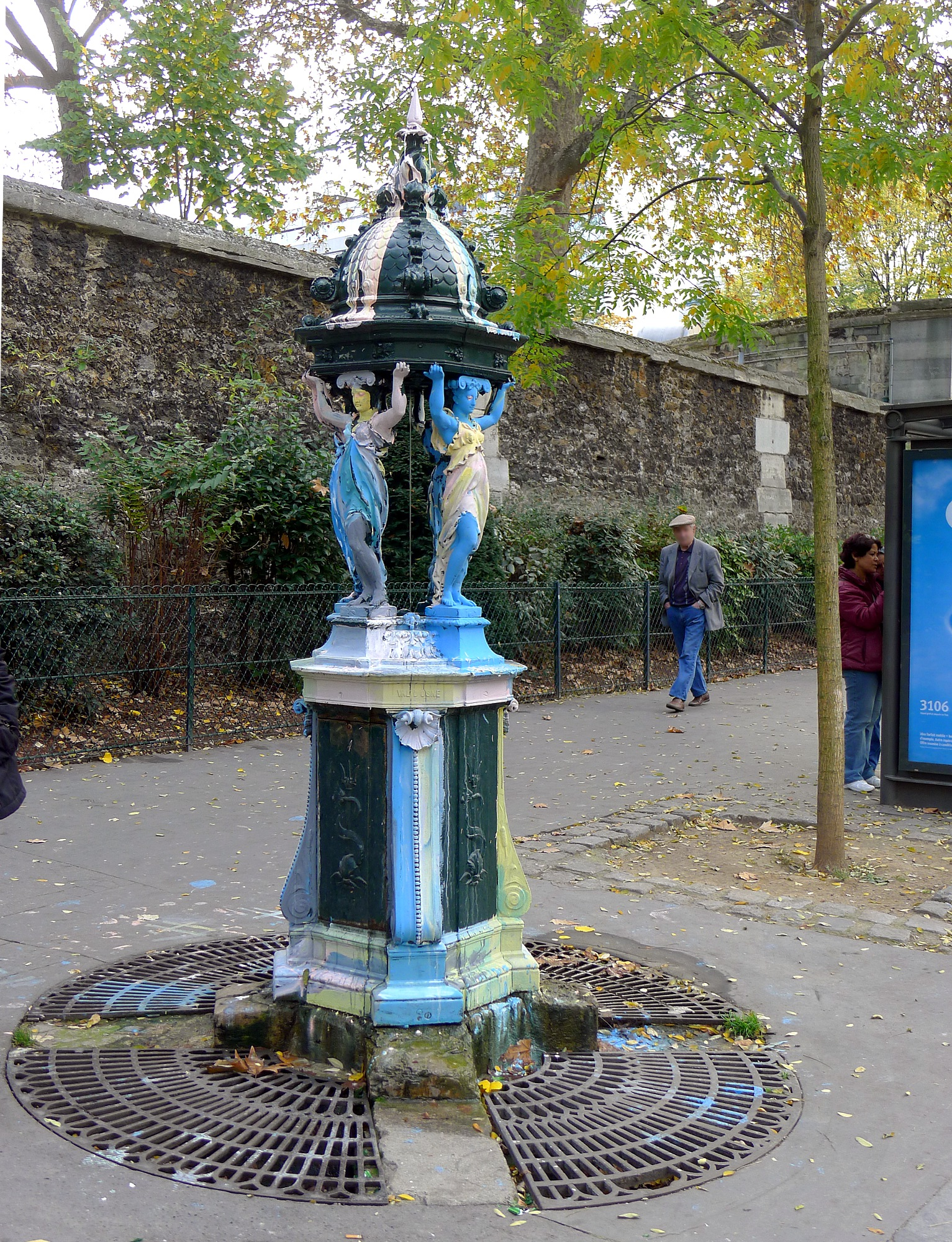
A large model on the Boulevard Menilmontant

13th arrondissement

- Place de la Commune de Paris: Rue de la Butte-aux-Cailles at Rue de l'Espérance
- Rue Richemont / Rue Domremy
- Place Jean-Delay
- Université Paris Diderot / Esplanade Pierre Vidal-Naquet
- Rue des Fréres d'Astier / Place Albert Londres
- ZAC Baudricourt, 66, avenue d'Ivry
- Jardin Georges Duhamel / Rue Jean Anouilh
- Rue Dumeril / Rue Jeanne d'Arc
- Place Louis Armstrong / Blvd de l'Hôpital
- Place Pierre Riboulet

14th arrondissement

- Place de l'Abbé Jean Leboeuf
- Rue d'Alésia / Rue Sarrette
- Avenue du Maine, face Mairie du 14ème arrondissement
- Place Denfert-Rochereau, at the Blvd Raspail
- Place Edgard Quinet, at the Rue de la Gaîté
- Place Jules Hénaffe
- Avenue Reille, at the Avenue René Coty
- 115, rue de la Tombe Issoire (Réservoir de la Vanne)
- 152 Avenue Paul-Vaillant-Couturier

15th arrondissement

- Place Alain Chartier
- Place Charles Vallin
- Place du Comtat-Venaissin / Rue des Frères Morane
- Place du Général Beuret
- Place Henri Rollet
- Hôpital Vaugirard (rue Vaugelas, dans les jardins)
- Rue des Morillons / Rue Brancion
- Place Henri Quenelle / Boulevard Pasteur
- Place Hobart Monmarche

16th arrondissement

- 10, boulevard Delessert
- Place Jean Lorrain
- Place de Passy
- Place du Père Marcellin Champagnat
- 194, avenue de Versailles

17th arrondissement

- Place Aimé Maillart / Rue Pierre Demours
- Place Charles Fillion / Place du Docteur-Félix-Lobligeois
- Place de Lévis
- 15, avenue Niel
- Place Richard Baret / Rue Mariotte
- 112, avenue de Villiers / Place Maréchal Juin
- 12, boulevard des Batignolles / Place de Clichy

18th arrondissement

- Place des Abbesses
- Place du Château-Rouge / Rue Custine
- Place Emile Goudeau
- Rue de la Goutte d'or, at the Rue de Chartres
- 42, boulevard Rochechouart
- Rue Saint-Eleuthère, at the Rue Azaïs
- Place Michel Petrucciani
- Rue Henri Brisson-Blvd Ney
- Rue de la Chapelle-Rue Raymond Queneau

19th arrondissement

- Rue Lally Tollendal / Rue Armand Carrel
- Ave Simon Bolivar / Rue Manin
- 106, rue Meaux at the Rue du Rhin
- 125, rue Meaux / Rue Petit
- Boulevard Sérurier / Passage des Mauxins

20th arrondissement

- Rue d'Avron / Rue Tolain
- 1, rue Eugène Belgrand / Mairie du 20ème
- Place Édith Piaf
- Place Maurice Chevalier
- 29, boulevard de Ménilmontant / Cimetière du Père Lachaise
- Place Joseph Epstein / Rue des Partants
- Place Octave Chanute
- Rue Piat, face au square

==== Small fountains ====
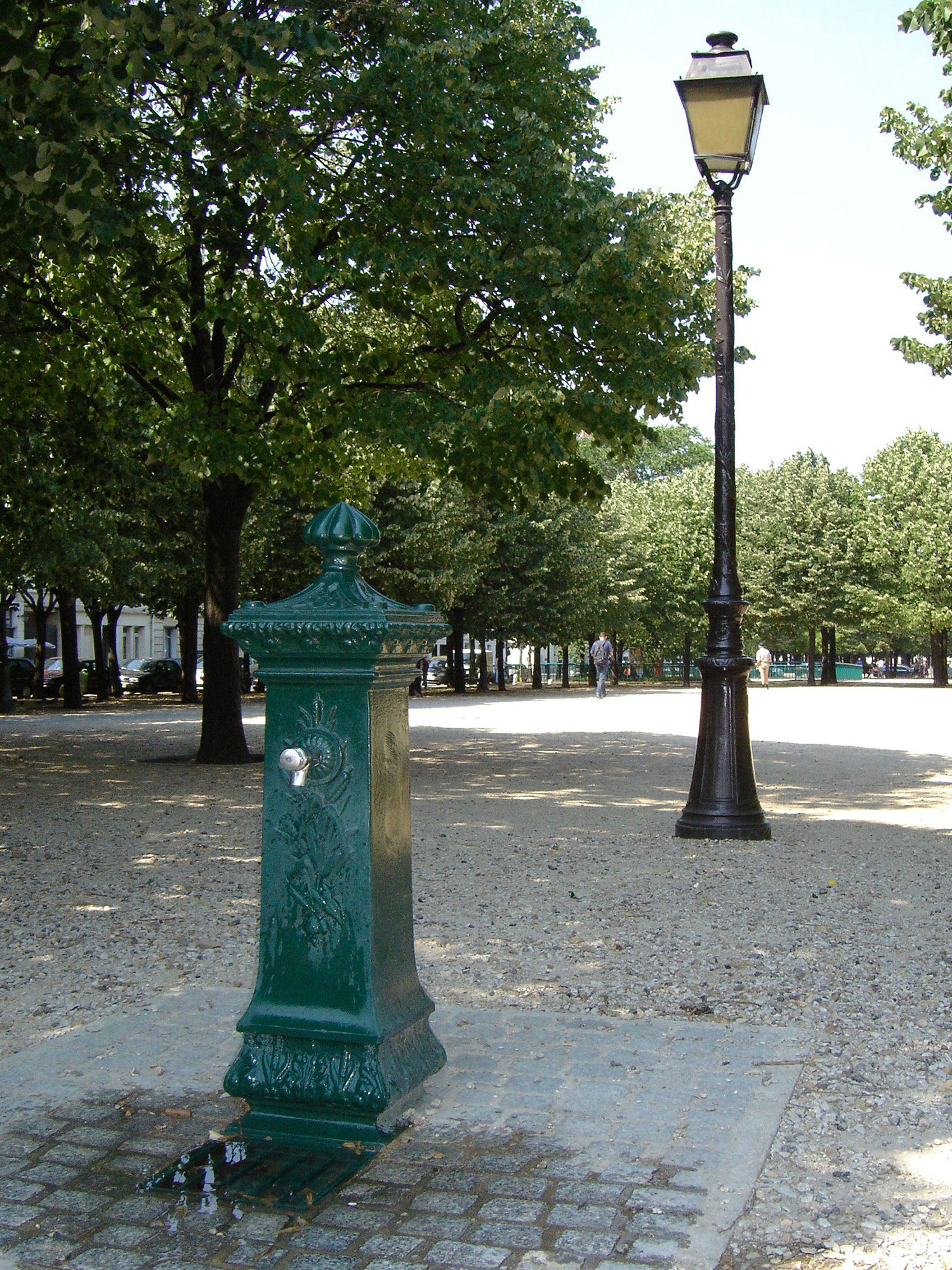
A small model on the Place des Invalides

1st arrondissement

- Jardin du Palais Royal
- Square du Vert-Galant

3rd arrondissement

- Place de la République (under construction)
- Square Saint-Gilles-Grand-Veneur

4th arrondissement

- Place Louis Lepine
- Quai de la Corse
- Square Albert Schweitzer
- Place Louis XIII (Place des Vosges)

6th arrondissement

- Square Laurent-Prache

7th arrondissement

- Place des Invalides

11th arrondissement

- 32, boulevard Richard Lenoir
- 74, boulevard Richard Lenoir

12th arrondissement

- Av de la Belle Gabrielle at Av de Nogent
- Route de la Dame Blanche
- Coulée Verte / Rue Charles Bossut
- Coulée Verte / Passage Gatbois
- Coulée Verte / Rue Traversière
- Square Charles Péguy

13th arrondissement

- Place Paul Verlaine
- Quai d'Austerlitz, Rue de Bellièvre
- Jardin Cyprian-Norwid

14th arrondissement

- Maison du Fontainier
- 75 Rue Didot

15th arrondissement

- Place Alain Chartier
- Place Cambronne
- Square Castagnary
- 19, place du Commerce
- 35, boulevard Pasteur
- Place Saint Charles
- Square Pablo Casals
- Square de la Porte de la Plaine

16th arrondissement

- Square Lamartine
- Parc de Bagatelle
- Jardin des serres d'Auteuil

18th arrondissement

- Square Suzanne Buisson

19th arrondissement

- Parc des Buttes-Chaumont-avenue Jacques-de-Linières
- 53 Quai de la Seine

20th arrondissement

- Square de Notre-Dame-de-la-Croix

==== Colonnaded fountains ====
16th arrondissement

- Rue de Rémusat, at the Rue de Mirabeau

17th arrondissement

- Avenue des Ternes, at the Place Pierre Demours

==== Wall-mounted model ====
5th arrondissement

- Intersection of the fr:Rue Geoffroy Saint-Hilaire and the fr:Rue Cuvier

=== France outside Paris ===
- Marseille
  - Allées Gambetta (1st arrondissement)
  - Place Bernard Cadenat (3rd arrondissement)
  - Parc du Palais Longchamp (4th arrondissement)
  - Place Jean-Jaurès (5th arrondissement)
  - Rue des Trois-Rois / Rue des Trois-Mages (6th arrondissement)
  - Place Edmond Rostand (6th arrondissement)
  - Place du Terrail (7th arrondissement)
  - Place Louis Goudard (15th arrondissement)
- Sucy-en-Brie – 11, rue du Temple, Place du la Metairie 94370
- Nantes – The sculptor who created the fountains, Charles Auguste Lebourg, was originally from Nantes. In addition to the Parisian fountains, a few were placed in Nantes in honor of their creator:
  - Place de la Bourse
  - Parc de la Gaudinière
  - Jardin des plantes, near the botanical garden
  - Jardin des Plantes, Boulevard Stalingrad, bas du jardin, near the entrance to "Gare SNCF"
  - Cours Cambronne
- Bordeaux
  - On 6 October 1873, another philanthropist, Daniel Osiris, ordered six Large Model Fountains and asked the community of Bordeaux to install them. Three surviving fountains are to be found at:
    - Place du Général Sarrail
    - Jardin Public
    - Gardens of the Hôtel de Ville
  More recent fountains are to be found at:
  - Place Mitchell (Mitchell was an Irishman who founded the city's first glassworks in the Rue de la Verrerie, creating the wine bottles that enabled the city to launch its international wine export trade)
  - Cours Xavier Arnozan (ex. Pavé des Chartrons)
  - Place Stalingrad
  - Place Porto-Riche
- Agen – on the Rue Grenouilla at the Boulevard de la République
- Clermont-Ferrand – between the Rue du 11 novembre and the Place de Jaude
- Puteaux – on the Boulevard Richard Wallace
- Saint-Denis, Réunion – inside the Jardin de l'État
- Toulon – at the city's municipal halls
- Toulouse
  - Place Saint-Georges
  - Jardin des Plantes
  - Place Henri Russell
  - Place du Ravelin
- Pau – corner of the Boulevard de la Paix and the Avenue de Buros
- Besançon – in the Jardin Granvelle

=== Europe outside France ===
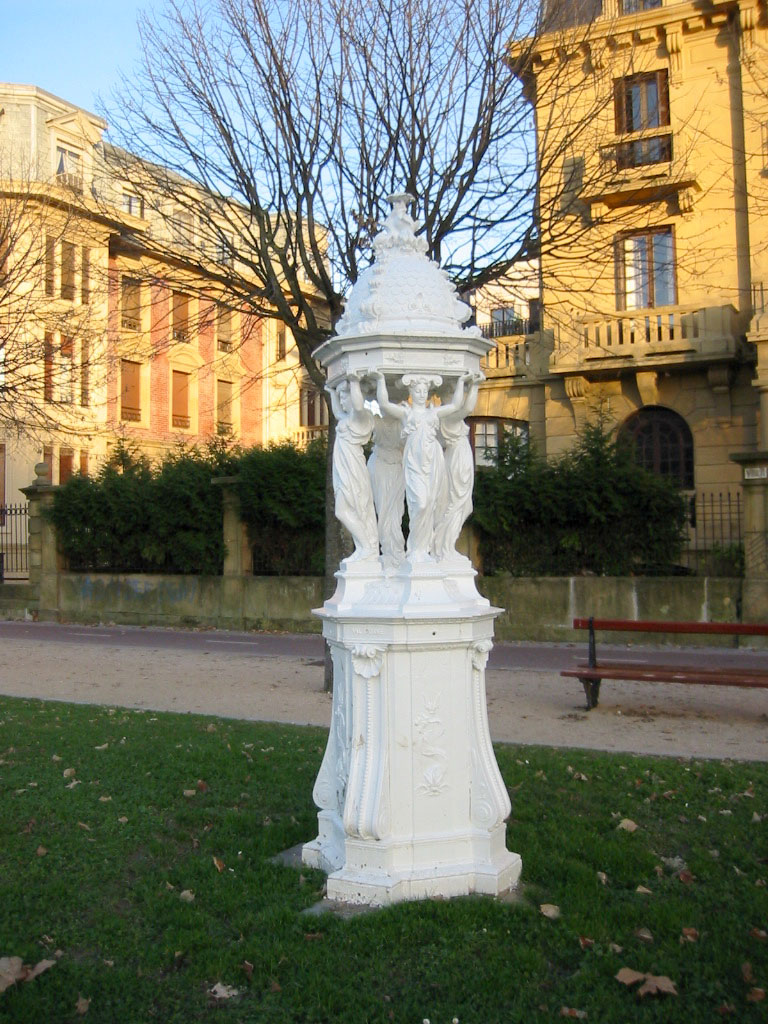
A Wallace Fontaine in San Sebastian, Spain

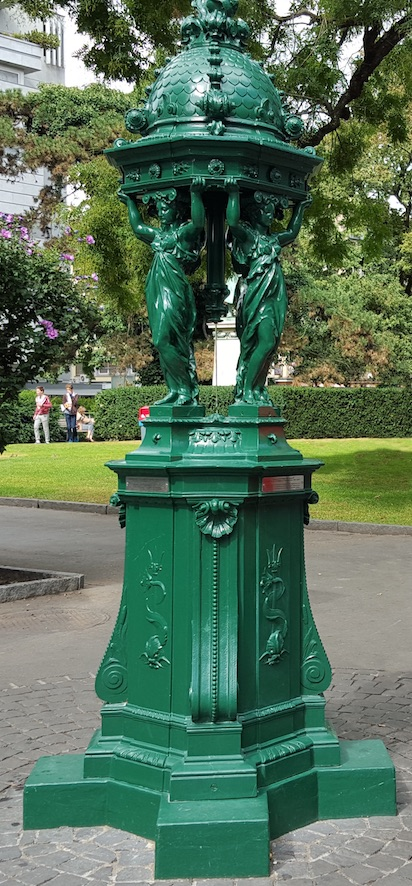
A Wallace fountain in Bahnhofstrasse, Zurich

- Barcelona – Twelve fountains were donated to Barcelona for the 1888 World Fair. Three remain:
  - La Rambla avenue, next to the wax museum.
  - Intersection of Gran Via de les Corts Catalanes with Passeig de Gràcia. One of the 4 caryatids is affectionately nicknamed Vera.
  - Office premises of the Barcelona water distribution company in the district of Collblanc.
- Constanta, Romania - The Parc of the Municipality
- Ferrol, Galicia – on the Reina Sofia park. Donated by Juan Romero Rodriguez to the city of Ferrol after he purchased it for 1000 reales at the Exposition Universelle of 1889 in Paris.
- Geneva – Promenade des Bastions (near The Reformation Wall)
- Lisbon – Rossio
- Lisburn – Two fountains:
  - Castle Gardens
  - Market Square, now relocated to Wallace Park, Lisburn
- Moscow – In the court-yard of Alekseevskaya pumping station
- Pontremoli, Italy – on the southern corner of Piazza Unità d'Italia
- Rotterdam – One, possibly two fountains:
  - Oud-Charlois, on the corner of Kaatsbaan and Charloisse Kerksingel
  - 'De Vier Gratiën' (The four graces), donated in 1883 by Maarten Mees to the city of Rotterdam. Initially installed in the pre-war Beursplein, it was relocated several times before ultimately disappearing from a contractor's storage in 2002. It remains unknown whether Rotterdam ever really had two fountains, or just the one, making De Vier Gratiën one and the same fountain found in Oud-Charlois.
- Zürich – In Pestalozzi Park along the Bahnhofstrasse.

=== Africa ===
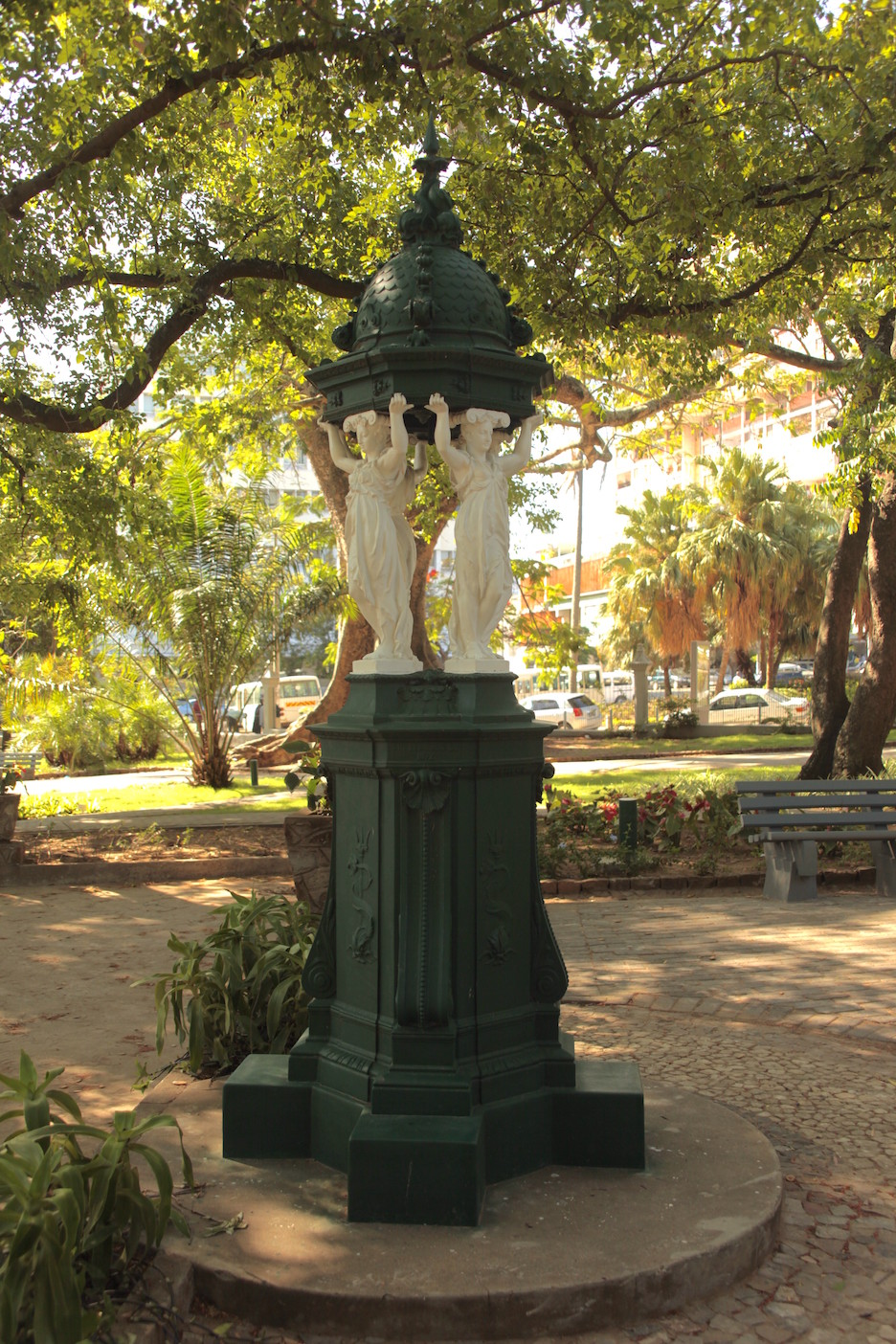
Jardim Tunduru Botanical Gardens, Maputo

- Maputo, Mozambique – in the Jardim Tunduru Botanical Gardens

=== North America ===
- Granby, Quebec – in Isabelle Park, on the corner of the Rue Dufferin and the Boulevard Leclerc. Installed in 1956, the fountain was a gift from France to celebrate Granby's "French Week".
- Montreal, Quebec – Île Notre-Dame, Parc des Îles, Jardin de la France, Montreal. This fountain was offered to the City of Montréal by the city of Paris in 1980 during the 1980 International Floralies fair held in Montreal.
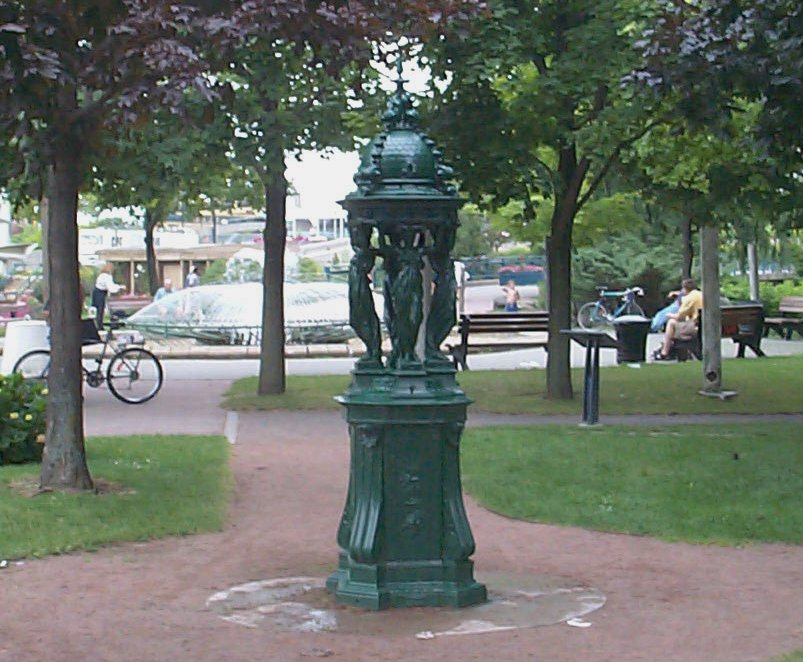
  Fontaine de Montréal
- Quebec City, Quebec – one at the intersection of the Grande-Allée and the Rue Cartier; another on the Rue Saint-Paul, by the turning to the Ruelle Légaré.
- Los Angeles, California – at the intersection of Westwood Blvd. and Broxton Ave., Westwood Village, Los Angeles
- New Orleans, Louisiana – in Latrobe Park along Decatur Street, near the French Market.

=== South America ===
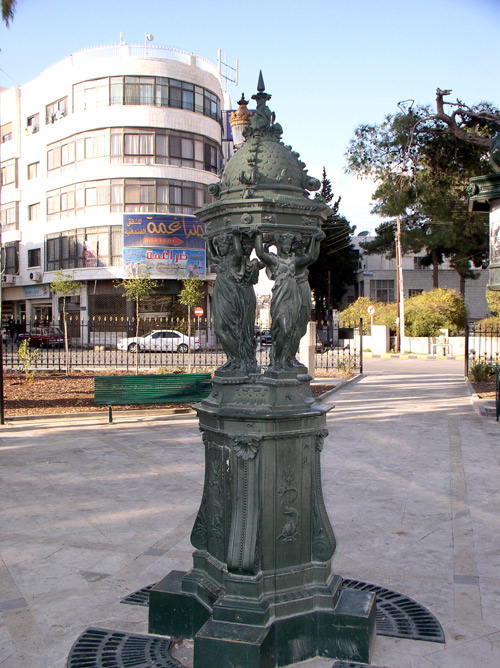
Wallace fountain in Paris Circle, Amman, Jordan

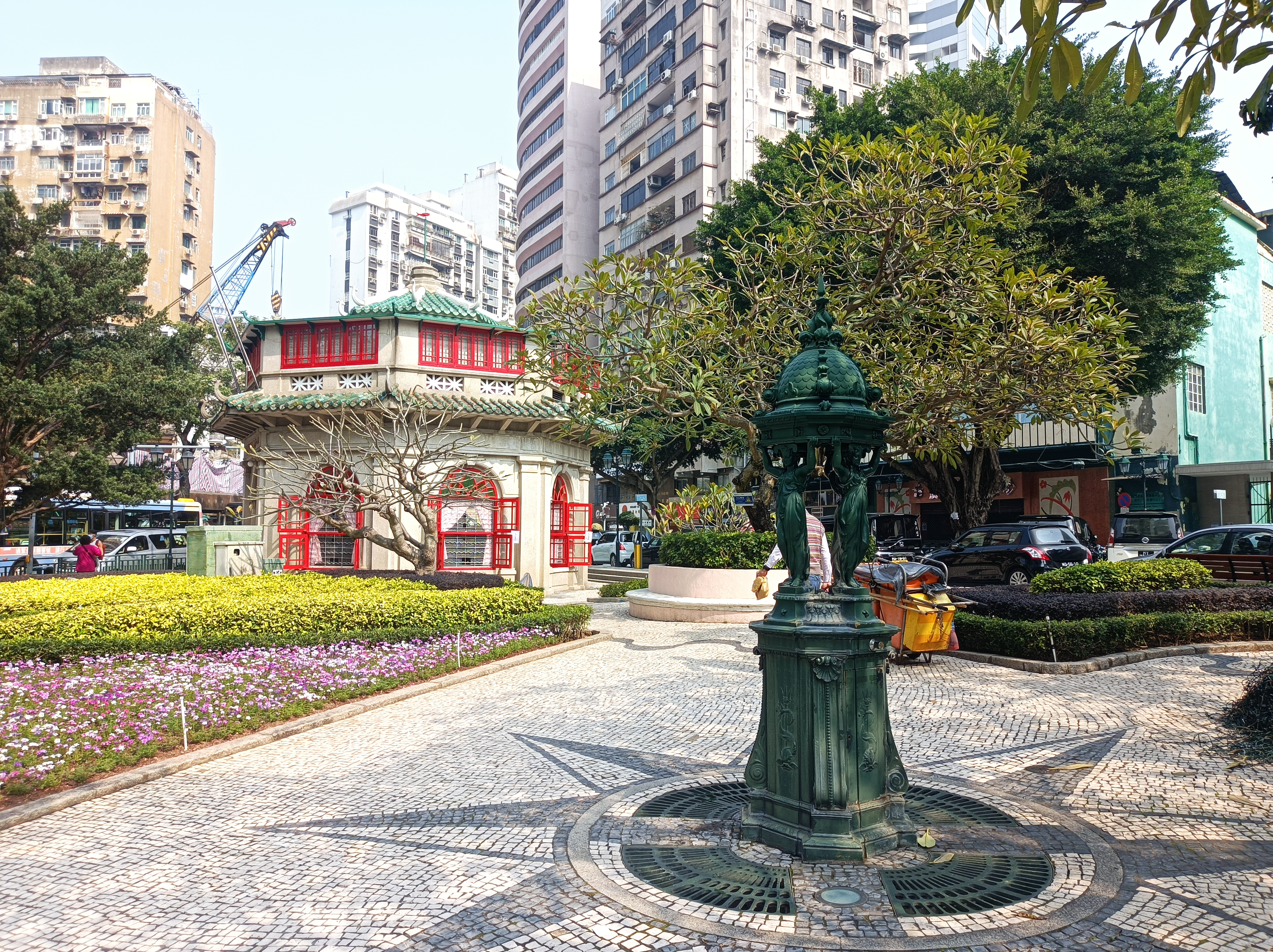
The Wallace fountain at the S. Francisco Garden in Macau

- Rio de Janeiro
  - Alto da Boa Vista
  - Jardim Botânico
  - Praça Dom Romualdo
  - Parque da Cidade
  - Praça Dom João Esberard
  - Praça Dom Romualdo
- Montevideo, Uruguay
  - on the corner of Yacare and Perez Castellano, outside the Mercado del Puerto.
  - in the Plaza Matriz.
  - in the Plaza Zabala.
  - in the Plaza Cagancha.
  - in front of the City Council, on the corner of 18 de Julio and Ejido.
  - in the Plaza de los Treinta y Tres Orientales, right in front of the Firemen's Palace and next of the Dionisio Díaz statue.

=== Asia ===
- Amman, Jordan – in Paris Square, near the French Institute, in Jabal al-Luweibdeh.
- Haifa, Israel – in Paris Square
- Jerusalem, Israel – on Ben Yehuda Street
- Tbilisi, Georgia
- Macau – The Wallace fountain is locally known as 和麗女神噴泉 in Chinese and A Fonte Wallace in Portuguese.
  - in S. Francisco Garden, installed in 2004.
  - in the town centre of Taipa, installed in 2005.

== See also ==
- List of works by Charles-Auguste Lebourg
- Henry D. Cogswell
- Château de la Gaudinière
