= Octagonal Pavilion Library =

Library in Macau, China

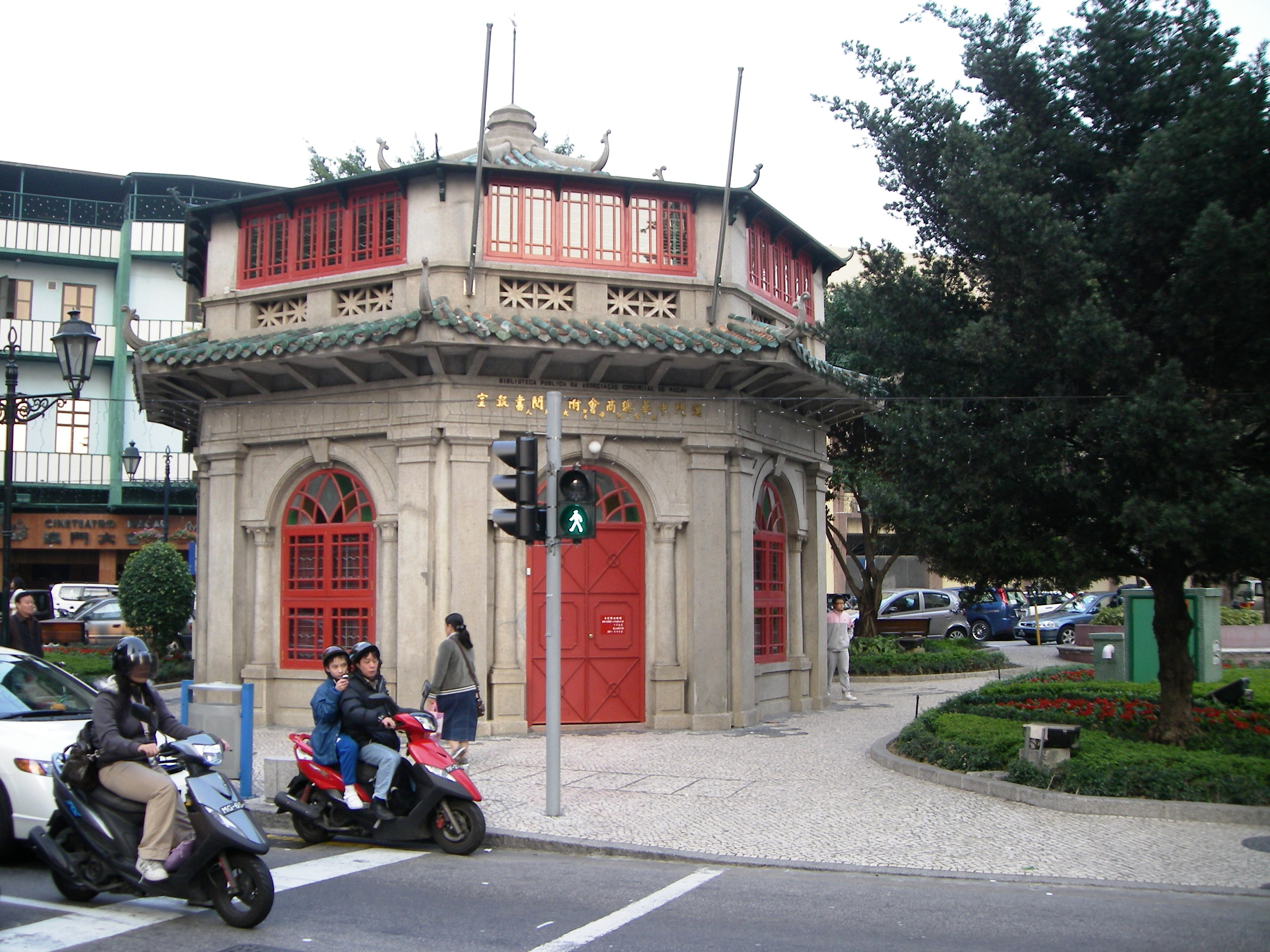
- 22°11′34″N 113°32′37″E
- Location: Macau
- Type: Public library
- Architect: Chen Kunpei

The Octagonal Pavilion Library (Chinese: 八角亭圖書館; Portuguese: Biblioteca Pública da Associação Comercial de Macau), formally named as the Reading and Newspaper Room attached to the Macau Chinese Chamber of Commerce, simply known as Octagonal Pavilion, is a library located on the periphery of the S. Francisco Garden of Macau. The library is named after its octagonal pavilion shape.

== Overview ==
Octagonal Pavilion Library has a collection of 20,000 books and more than 90 kinds of newspapers and periodicals. And it has a total surface area of 1,130 square feet.

== History ==
Octagonal Pavilion Library was designed in 1926 and completed in 1927. It is the first Chinese library and the first public library to open in Macau.

On November 1, 1948, the Octagonal Pavilion Library was inaugurated by Albano Rodrigues de Oliveira, the then Governor of Macau, and still serves the general public today.
