= List of works by Charles-Auguste Lebourg =

Charles-Auguste Lebourg was a French sculptor born in Nantes in 1829. He died in Paris in 1906. This is a listing of his main works.

== Main works ==
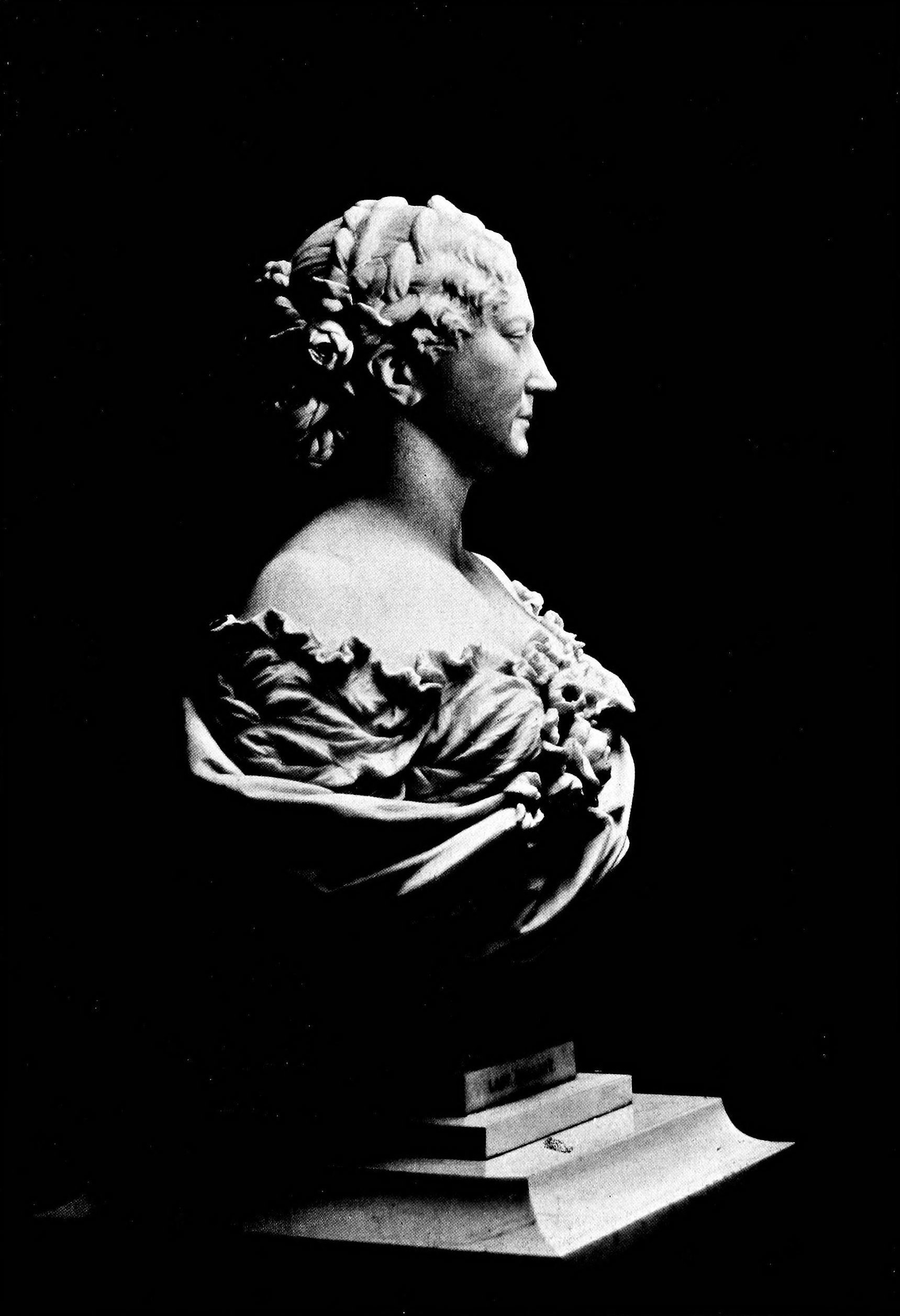
Bust of Lady Wallace

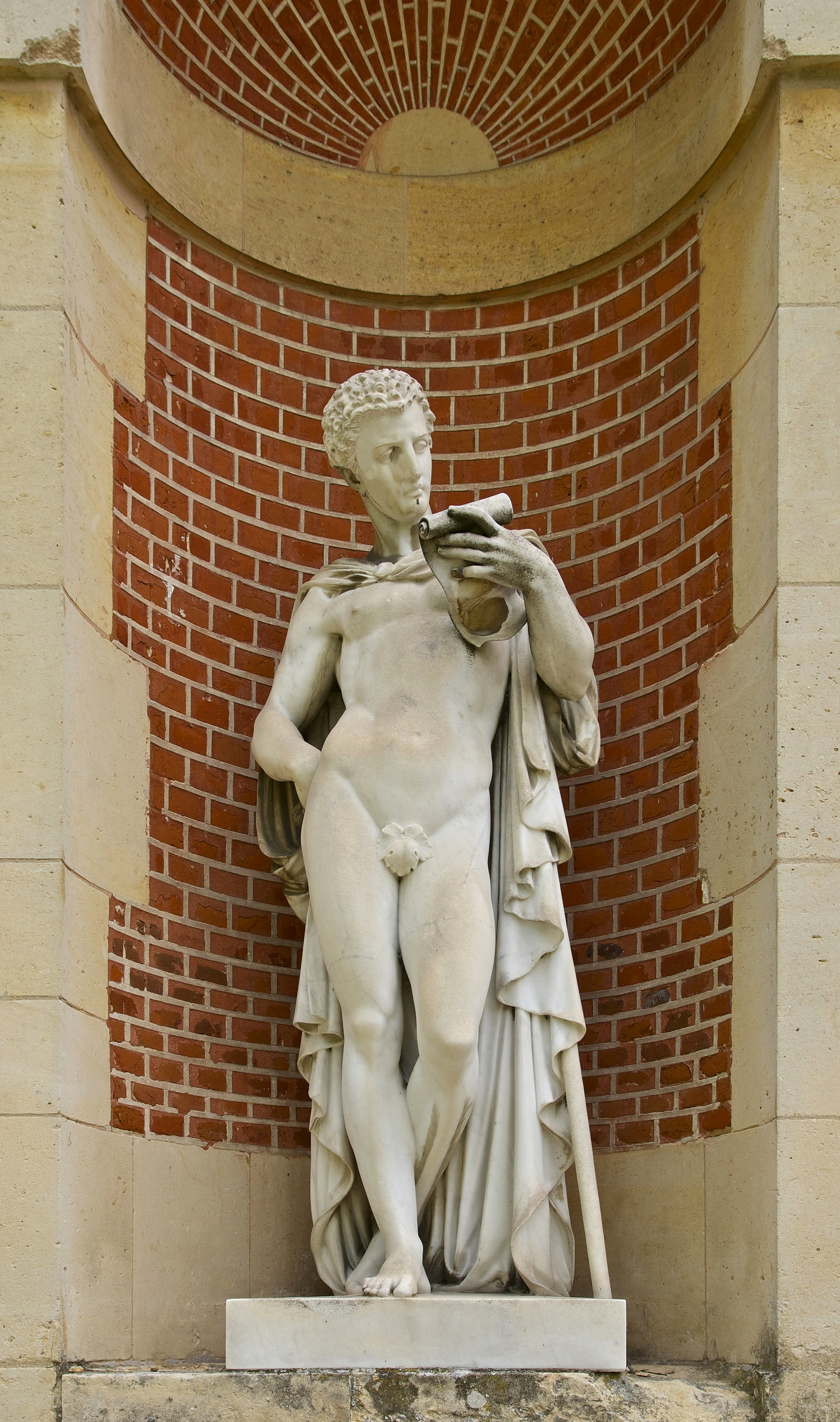
Marble statue "Berger lisant" in a niche of the wing of the "Galerie des Cerfs", Château de Fontainebleau

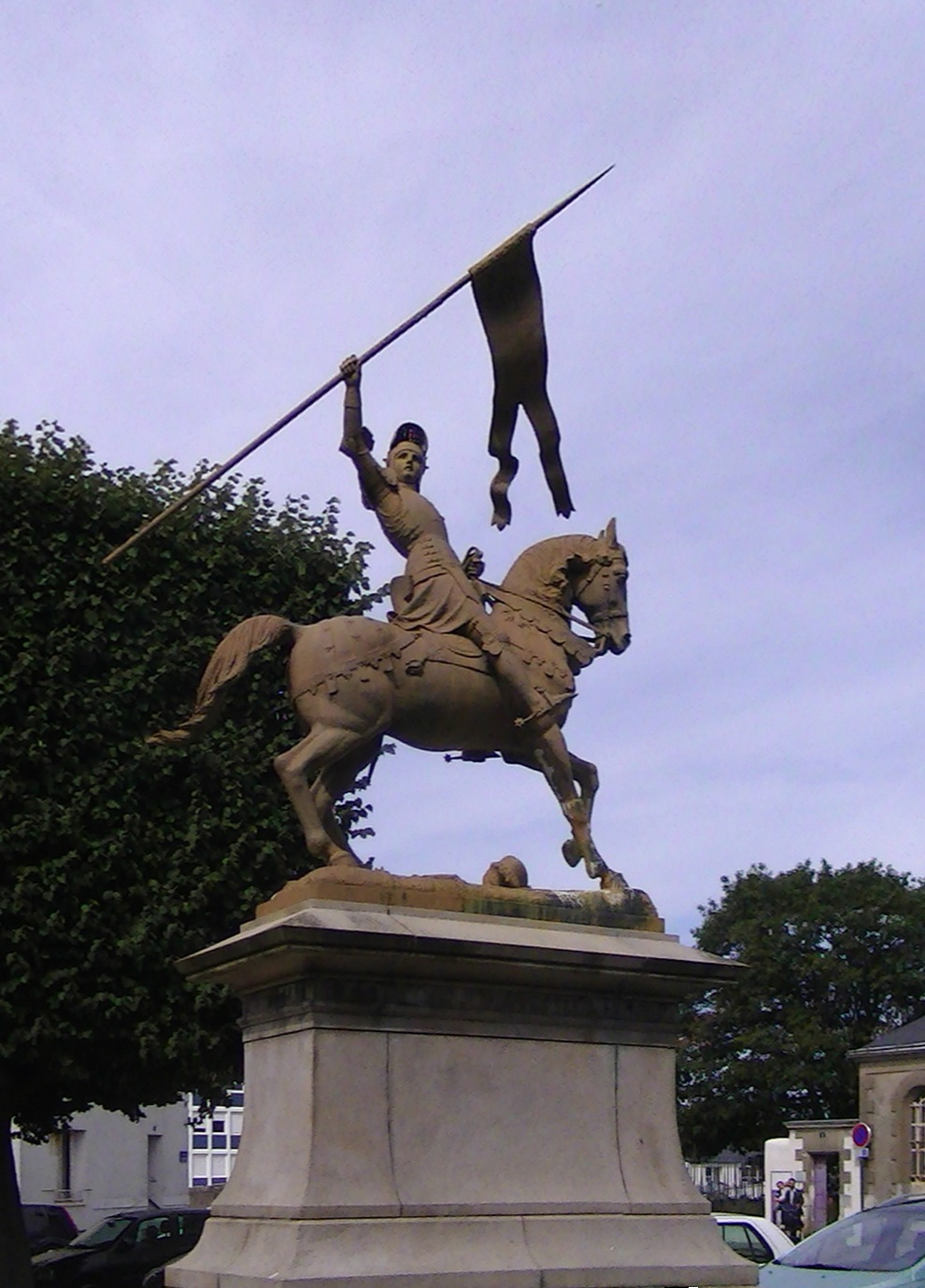
Lebourg's statue of Joan of Arc in Nantes

His main works are listed below:

- Hôtel de Ville, Paris. In 1881, Lebourg executed an allegory of the city of Nantes as part of the decoration of the Hôtel de Ville in Paris.
- "Travail". Lebourg executed the bronze statue "Travail" for the École Diderot. It was shown at the Salon of 1885 and the Paris Exposition Universelle (1889).
- "Berger lisant". This sculpture depicting a shepherd reading stands in the grounds of the Château de Fontainebleau.
- Bust of Richard Wallace, Fourth Marquess of Hertford and Lady Wallace. In 1872 Lebourg completed a posthumous bust in white marble based on a photograph of the Wallaces by Étienne Corjat of 1855. His white marble bust of Lady Wallace shown here was exhibited at the Paris Salon of 1872.
- 17 rue de Châteaudun, Paris. As external decoration of this building in Paris' 9th arrondissement, Lebourg created two caryatids.
- 13 boulevard de Sébastopol, Paris. There is a Lebourg decoration on the outside of this building.
- Nantes, cimetière Miséricorde. Lebourg executed several medallions for tombs in this cemetery including that of Général Mellinet.
- Bust of Jean-Marie Écorchard. This bust is in Nantes' Jardin des plantes.
- Monument to Joan of Arc. Lebourg executed the equestrian statue of Joan of Arc in Nantes.

=== The Louvre ===
Lebourg has three of his sculptures decorating parts of the outside of the Louvre. His "La Chasse" is one of the group of children decorating what is known as the aile en retour Mollien, south of the pavillon Mollien on the Cour Napoléon. The second of Lebourg's sculptures can be seen in the pavillon Richelieu where the tympanum of the arcade of the passage leading to the rue de Rivoli is decorated with Lebourg's bas relief "Vérite et Histoire". The third sculpture, again part of the Cour Napoléon, decorates the Apollon rotunda and is entitled "La Forge". The Musée d'Orsay hold the plaster model of "La Chasse".

=== Wallace Fountains ===
Lebourg is arguably best known for his caryatids for the famous cast-iron Wallace fountain, a public drinking fountain seen all over France and in many parts of the world. They are named after the Englishman Richard Wallace, who financed their construction. A great aesthetic success, they are recognized worldwide as one of the symbols of Paris. A Wallace Fountain can be seen outside the Wallace Collection in London, the gallery that houses the works of art collected by Sir Richard Wallace and the first four Marquesses of Hertford. The caryatids depict "La Simplicité", "La Bonté", "La Sobriété" and "La Charite" as shown below.

The four cariatides of the Wallace fountain

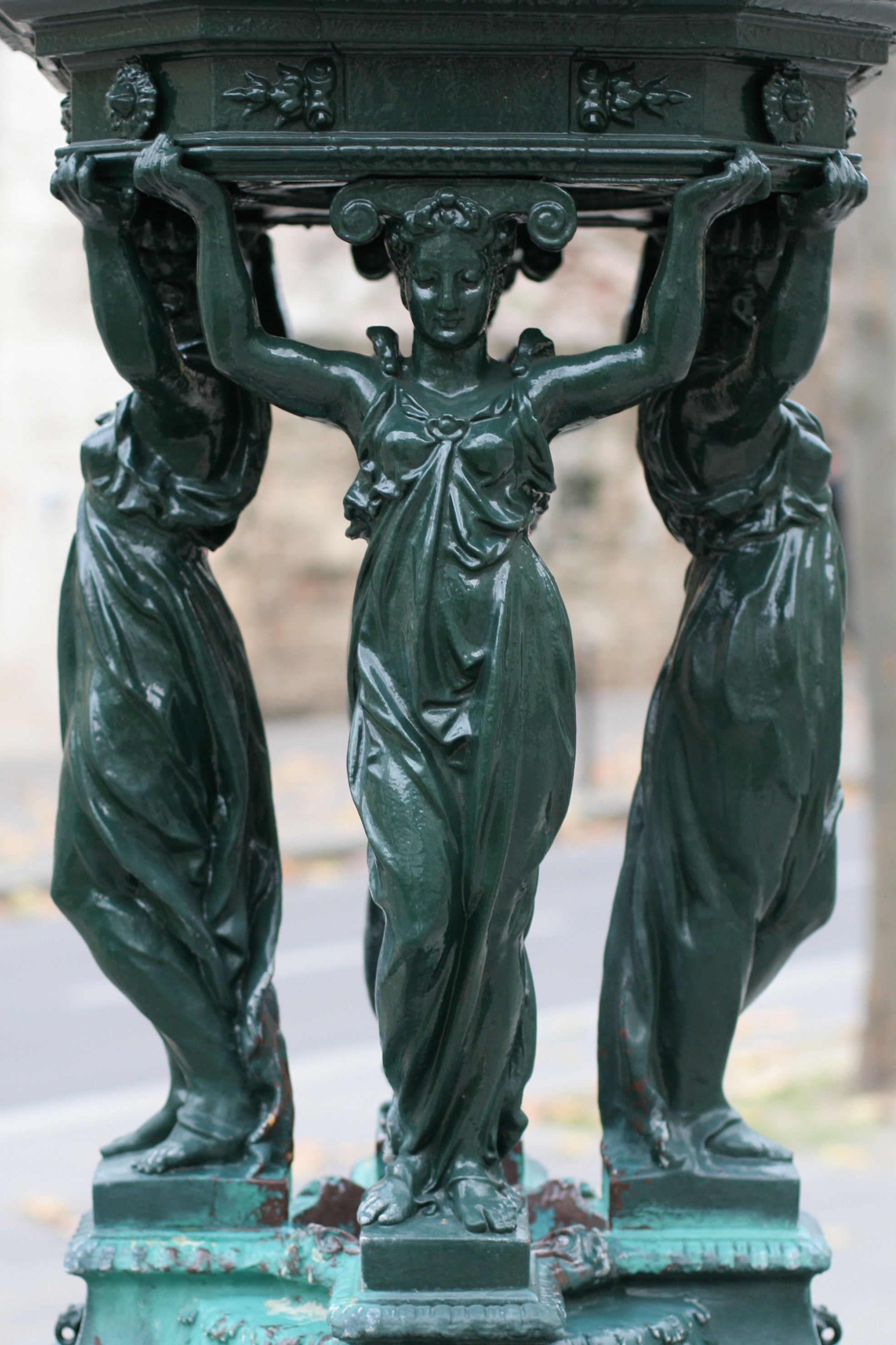

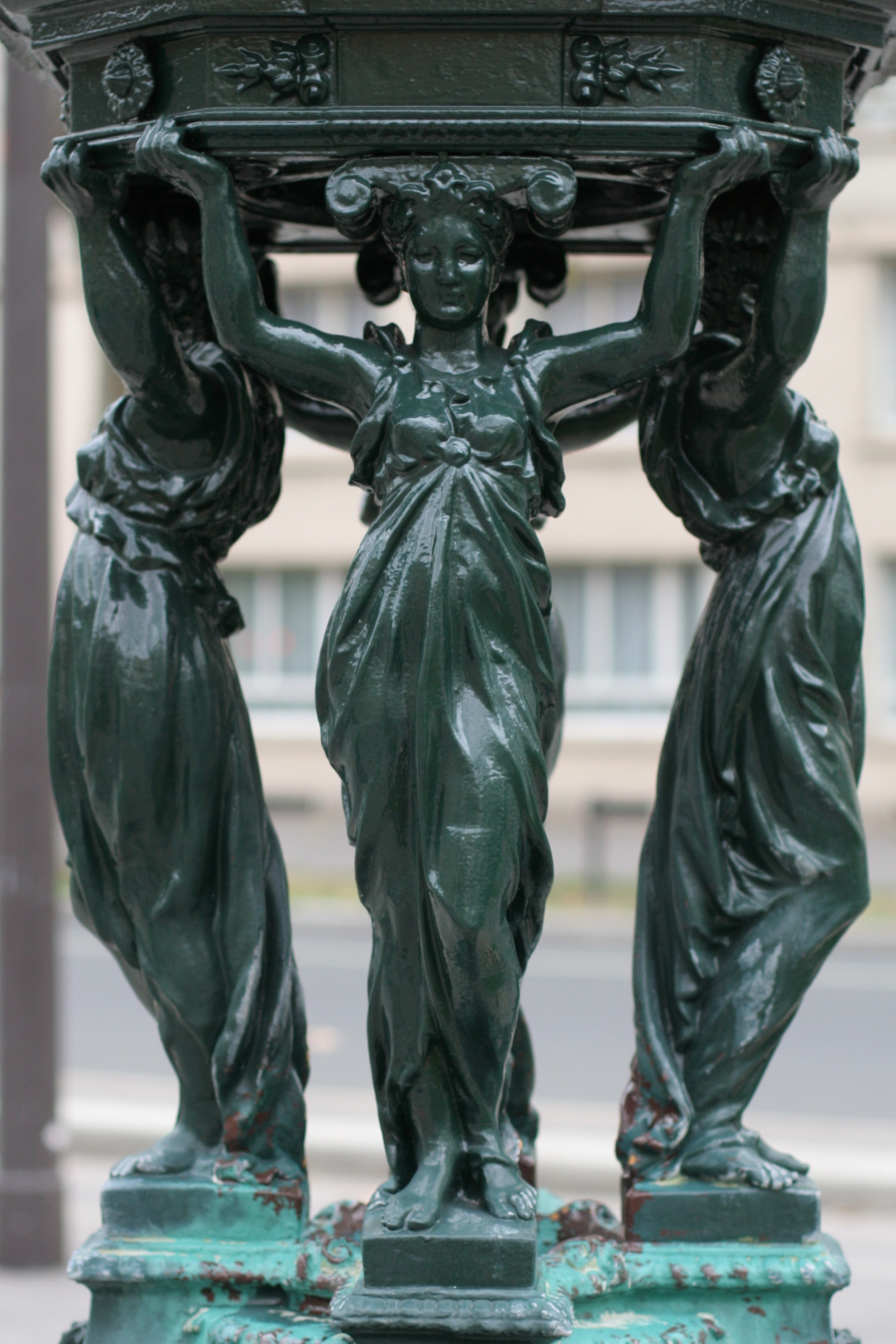

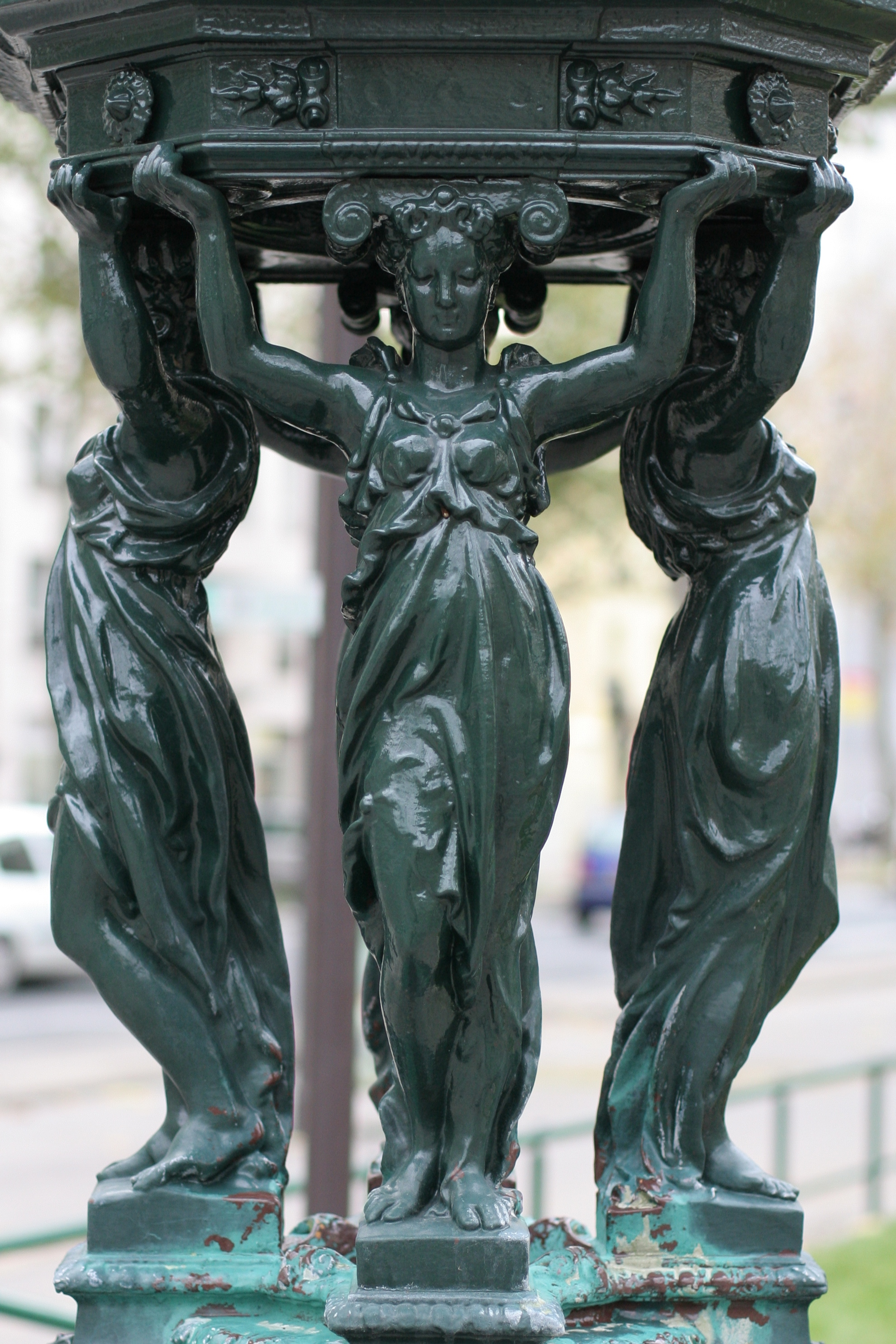

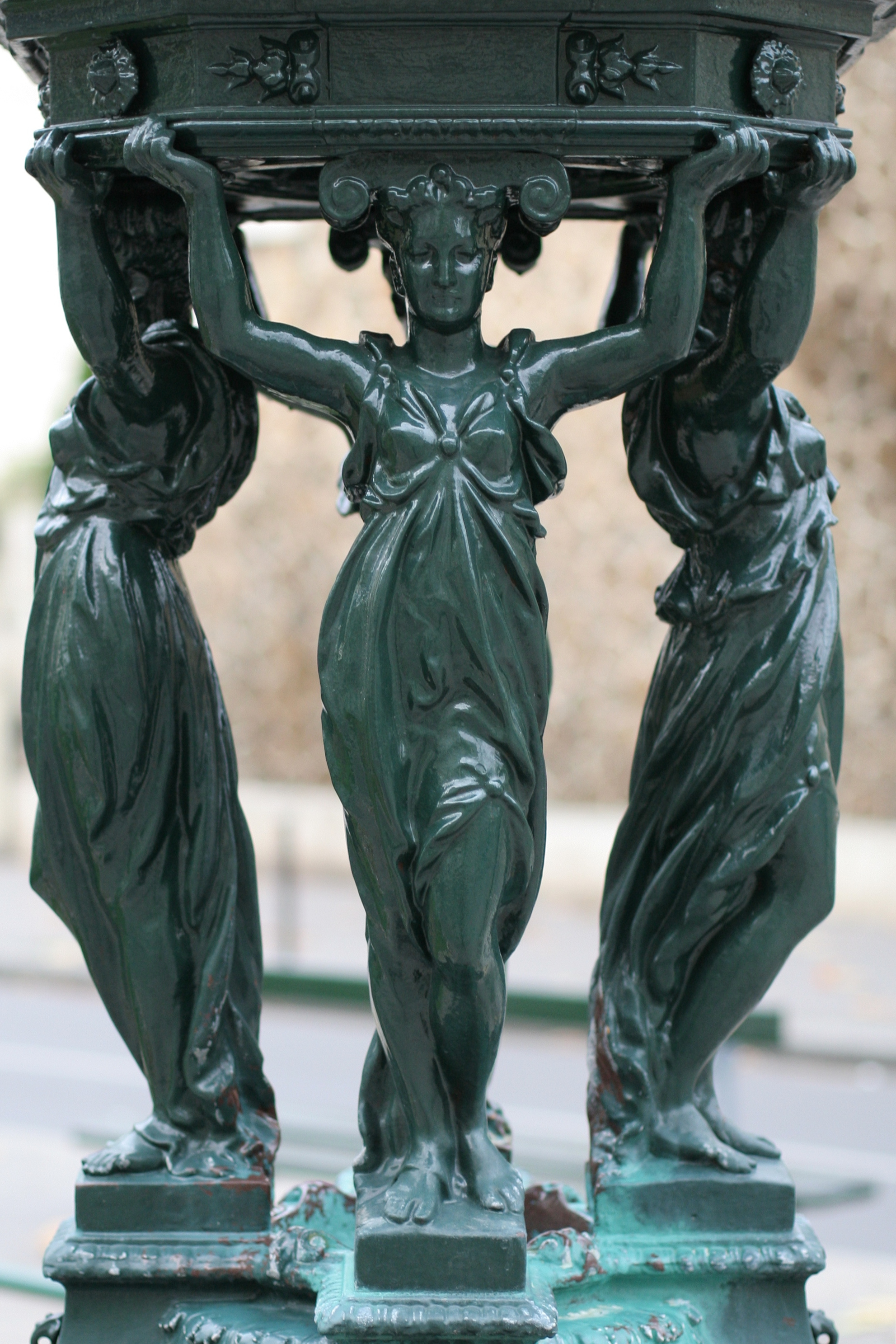

=== Monument to the men of Loire-Inférieure who died in the 1870 war ===
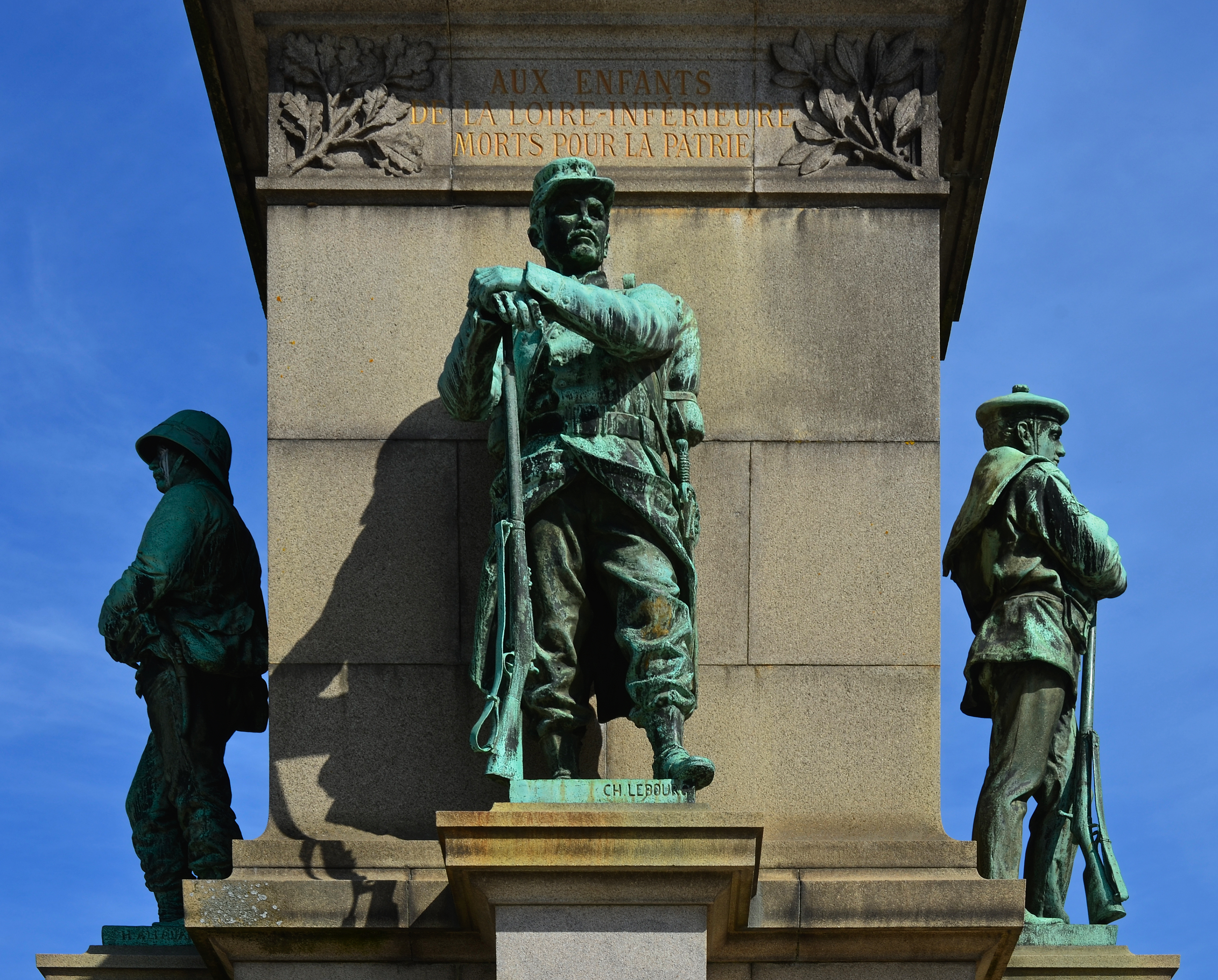
Lebourg's Infantryman ("Le Fantassin") stands between Henri Émile Allouard.s " "Le Fusilier colonial" and Louis-Auguste Baralis' "Le Marin"

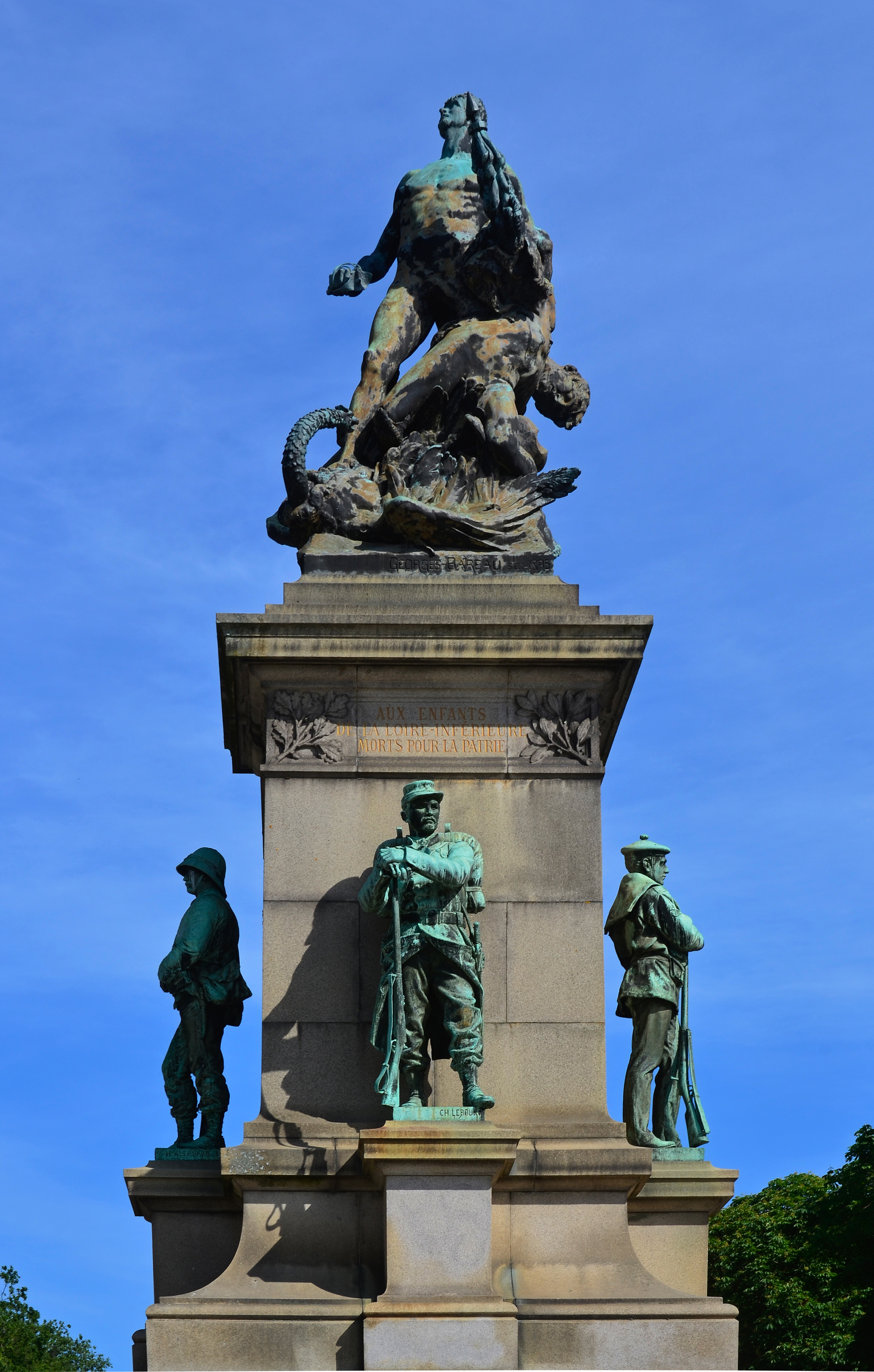
The Nantes memorial to the Franco-Prussian war

This monument stands in Nantes's Place Duchesse-Anne. Four sculptors worked on the monument, Georges Bareau, Charles-Auguste Lebourg, Henri Émile Allouard and Louis-Auguste Baralis. Lebourg's contribution was the statue of the infantryman. The monument was erected in 1897 and the inauguration ceremony in April of that year was attended by Félix Faure, Jules Méline, Louis Barthou, Admiral Armand Besnard and Hippolyte-Étienne Étiennez the Nantes mayor. The bronze at the monument's summit, entitled "Pour le drapeau" was by Georges Bareau and had been cast in bronze by Barbedienne. It depicted a man slaying an eagle and at the monuments base were "le Fantassin" by Lebourg, "le Marin" by Louis Baralis, "l’Artilleur" by Émile Allouard and "Le Fusilier colonial" also by Allouard. In 1940 the occupying Germans dismantled the bronze believing that the slain eagle could be construed as representing the German eagle but the municipal workers of Nantes delegated to carry out the dismantlement managed to hide the sculpture, so stopping it being melted down. The work was retrieved in 1981, restored and re-erected in 1987.

== Lebourg works held in Nantes's Musée des beaux-arts ==
- "Bacchus". This terracotta bas-relief by Lebourg dates to 1877.
- "Bohémienne". This work in plaster was purchased by the museum in 1913.
- Docteur Guepin. This plaster statuette by Lebourg dates to 1888.
- Docteur Teillais. A bust in terracotta dating to 1885.
- "Eros". A terracotta bas-relief acquired in 1892.
- "Esmeralda". A work in plaster acquired in 1917.
- Ferdinand Favre. This study of a former mayor of Nantes dates to 1892.
- "Joyeux devis", This bronze was acquired in 1892.
- Jules Elie Delaunay. This bronze bust was executed by Lebourg in 1894. Shown at the 1895 Salon.
- "La Prêtresse d'Eleusis". This marble piece dates to 1874 and is one of Lebourg's best known pieces. It was shown at the 1874 Salon.
- "Le Tueur d'aigles". A plaster statue dating to 1893.
- M. Thomas Maisonneuve. A bronze acquired in 1939.
- Madame Lebourg. This plaster study of his wife dates to 1899.
- Main de femme. This bronze study of a hand was acquired in 1910.
- "Mycias", A terracotta work acquired in 1929.
- Portrait d'Elie Delaunay. A plaster bust.
- Portrait de femme. A marble bust acquired in 1892.
- Ange Guépin. An 1889 plaster work depicting Ange Guépin who was professor of medicine at Nantes.
- "Enfant nègre jouant avec un lézard". This 1853 work was cast in bronze by Butte et Laurent. Shown at the 1853 Salon.
- "L’Enfant à la sauterelle". This work was exhibited at the 1868 Paris Salon.

== Works shown at the Salon but current whereabouts unknown ==
"Joueur de biniou, dansant la nigouce". A bronze statuette shown at the 1857 Salon.

"Vierge gauloise marchant au sacrifice". A work in marble shown at the 1859 Salon.

"Une mère". A marble group shown at the 1861 Salon.

"Danaé". Statue in plaster also shown at the 1861 Salon.

"La Folie". Terracotta bust shown at the 1865 Salon.

"Jeune oiseleur rendant la liberté à une hirondelle". A bronze statue shown at the 1868 Salon.

Saint Jacques le Mineur. Statue in stone shown at the 1863 Salon.

"Le centaure Eurytion enlevant la fiancée de Pirithoüs". A group in plaster shown at the Salon of 1868

Emile Barrault. Bronze bust shown at the 1870 Salon. Used on the Barrault tomb in Père Lachaise cemetery.

Boissaye. Marble statue shown at the 1873 Salon.

Le docteur Quarante. Bust in terracotta shown at the 1878 Salon.

Emile de Girardin. Bust in plaster shown at the 1880 Salon.

Auguste Comte. Marble bust shown at the 1880 Salon.

A. de Lancey. Marble bust shown at the 1882 Salon.

V. Cossé. Marble bust shown at the 1884 Salon.

M. Lheureux. Bust in terracotta shown at the 1878 Salon.

Théodore Maisonneuve. Statuette in bronze shown at the 1889 Salon.

Dante. A bronze bust shown at the 1891 Salon.

Le baron d’Espéléta. Statuette in bronze shown at the 1893 Salon.

Tête de setter Laverack. A bronze shown at the 1896 Salon.

Mme René de Tocqueville. Marble bust shown at the 1904 Salon.

== See also ==
- Fountains in Paris
