= S. Francisco Garden =

Garden in Sé, Macau

Coordinates: 22.192473°N 113.544672°E

- Chinese: 加思欄花園; Portuguese: Jardim de S. Francisco
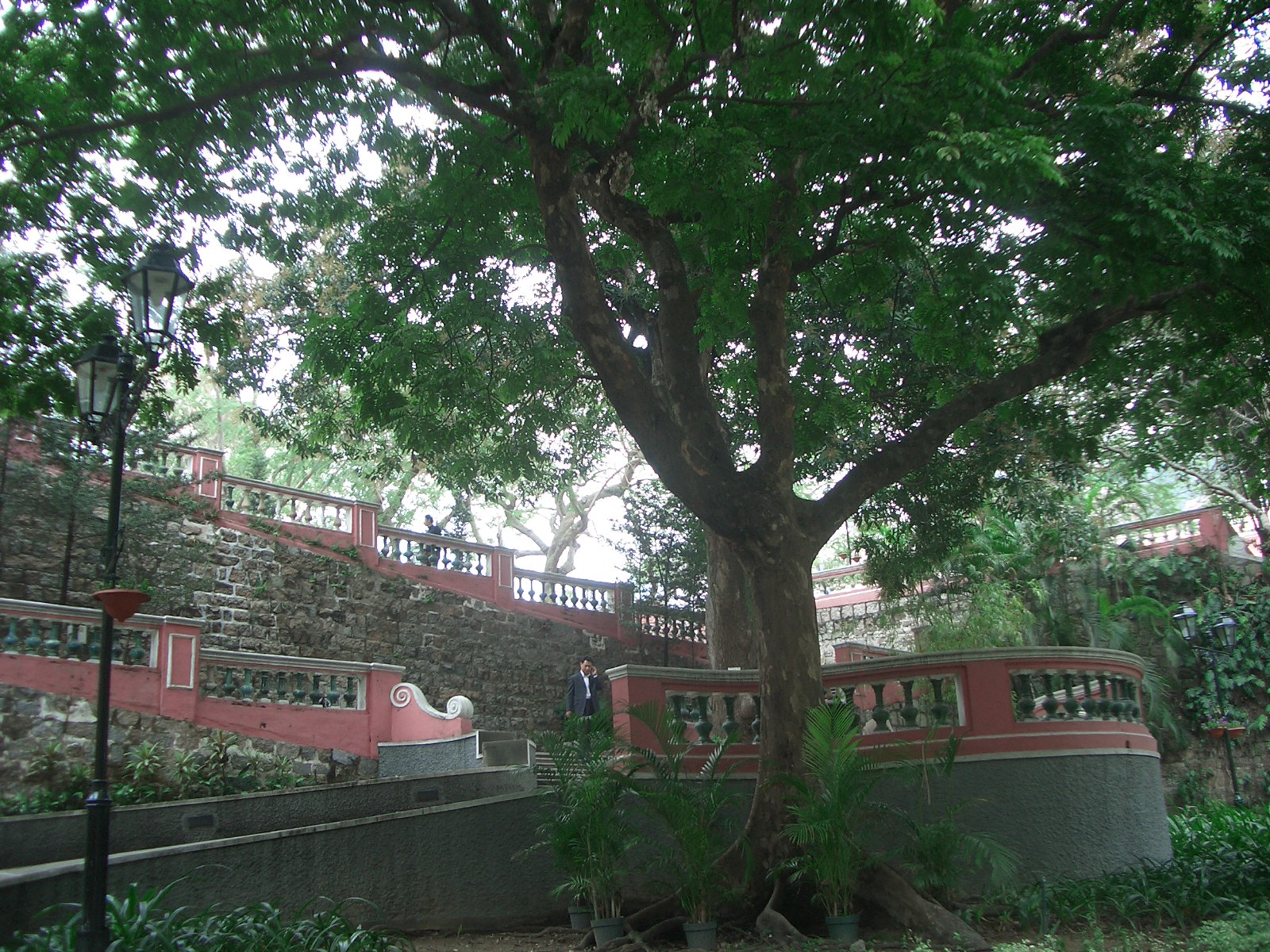
- Interactive map of S. Francisco Garden
- Type: Garden
- Location: Sé, Macau, China

S. Francisco Garden

Chinese name
- Traditional Chinese: 加思欄花園
- Simplified Chinese: 加思栏花园
Transcriptions
Standard Mandarin
- Hanyu Pinyin: Jiāsīlán Huāyuán
Yue: Cantonese
- Jyutping: gaa1 si1 laan4 faa1 jyun4*2

Portuguese name
- Portuguese: Jardim de S. Francisco

S. Francisco Garden (Chinese: 加思欄花園; Portuguese: Jardim de S. Francisco) is a floral garden on Rua de Santa Clara in Sé, Macau.

== History ==
The S. Francisco Garden is the oldest garden in Macau. The history of the garden goes back nearly four centuries. In 1580, a convent stood at the site now occupied by the garden. The convent was built by Castilian friars of the Franciscan order. The builders of the convent were supplanted by Portuguese friars five years later. But the name of the Castilian friars remains closely associated with the place even today: The garden continues to be referred to by its Cantonese name 'Ka-Si-Lán-Fa-Yun', meaning 'Garden of the Castilians'.

== Changes ==
The garden has undergone some changes down the years. The most significant of the changes took place in the 1920s, when the wave of modernization also impacted the garden. A new road, the Rua de Sta Clara, was built right through the garden, bisecting it. The garden iconic bandstand was demolished. The garden, however, still managed to salvage its character. One of the oldest features of the garden that still survive are the old arches near the Quartel de S. Francisco wall. The ancient giant trees still stand.

== The garden today ==
There is an octagonal pavilion of Chinese architecture on the lower level of the garden. Amazingly, this small building is one of Macau's busiest libraries. The garden also retains most of the beautiful balustrade that goes around it. The balusters also serve as support for the railing of the stairs that join the lower level of the garden to the upper level. On this level the garden features a tower built by the Portuguese military to honour World War I war heroes. Once a military barracks (now used as office for the Secretariat for Security) and officers club, the grounds are now a garden and home to the Association for the handicapped.

== See also ==
- List of tourist attractions in Macau
