= One country, two systems =

Chinese constitutional principle

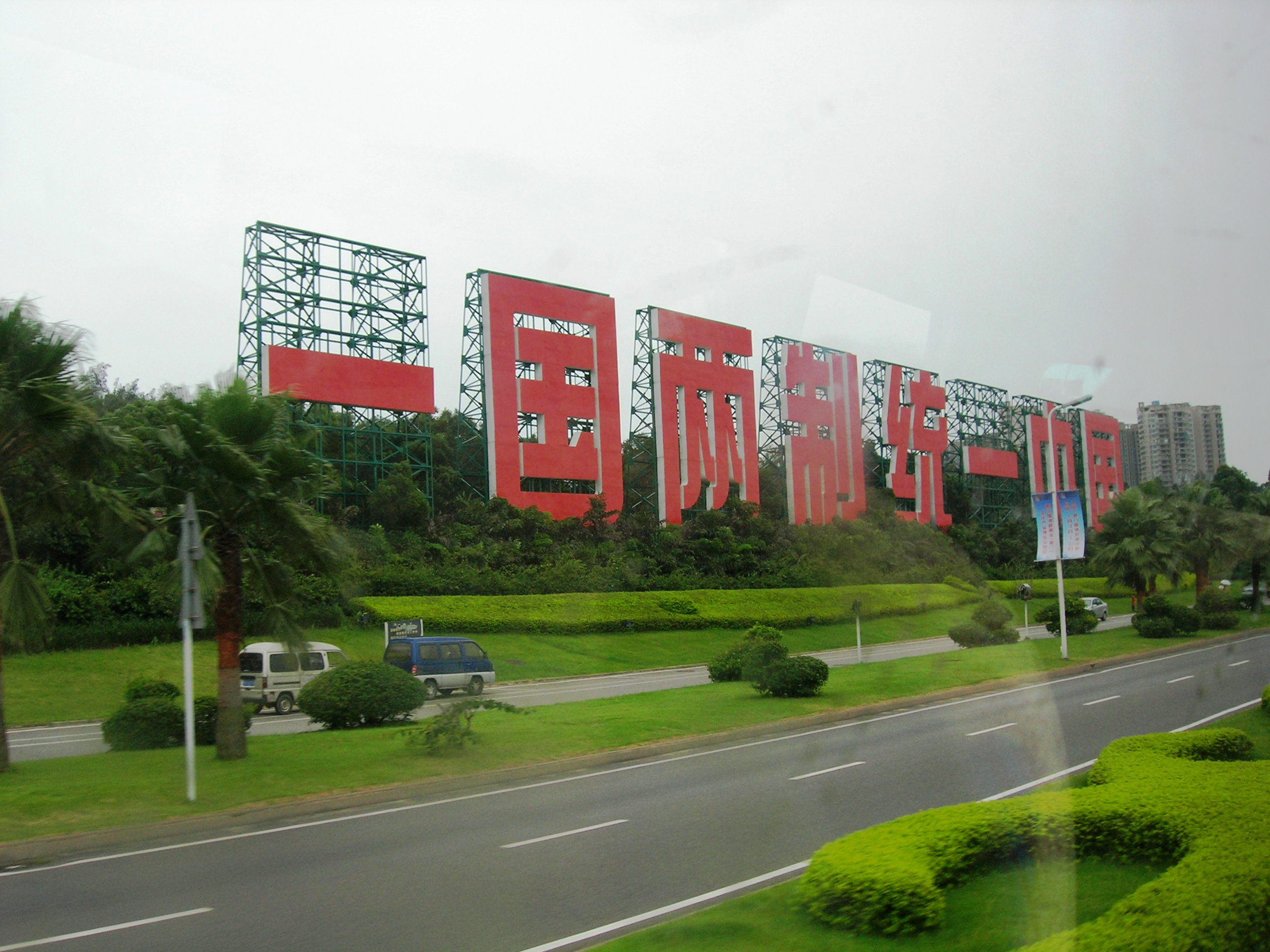
- Sign in Xiamen reading "一国两制统一中国" (Yīguó liǎngzhì tǒngyī Zhōngguó, transl. One country, two systems unites China). The sign faces Republic of China-controlled Kinmen.

Chinese name
- Simplified Chinese: 一国两制
- Traditional Chinese: 一國兩制
Transcriptions
Standard Mandarin
- Hanyu Pinyin: Yīguó liǎngzhì
- Bopomofo: ㄧ ㄍㄨㄛˊ ㄌㄧㄤˇ ㄓˋ
- Wade–Giles: I^{1}-kuo^{2} liang^{3}-chih^{4}
- Tongyong Pinyin: Yi-guó liǎng-jhìh
- IPA: [í.kwǒ ljàŋ.ʈʂɻ̩̂]
Yue: Cantonese
- Yale Romanization: Yātgwok léuhngjai
- Jyutping: jat1 gwok3 loeng5 zai3
- IPA: [jɐt̚˥ kʷɔk̚˧ lœŋ˩˧ tsɐj˧]

Portuguese name
- Portuguese: Um país, dois sistemas

"One country, two systems" (1C2S) is a constitutional principle of the People's Republic of China (PRC) describing the governance of the special administrative regions of Hong Kong and Macau.

Deng Xiaoping developed the one country, two systems concept. This constitutional principle was formulated in the early 1980s during negotiations over Hong Kong between China and the United Kingdom. It provided that there would be only one China, but that each region would retain its own economic and administrative system. Under the principle, each of the two regions could continue to have its own governmental system, legal, economic and financial affairs, including trade relations with foreign countries, all of which are independent from those of the mainland. The PRC has also proposed to apply the principle toward unification with Taiwan; however, Taiwan has consistently rejected the proposal.

== Background ==
Deng Xiaoping developed the principle of one country, two systems in relation to Hong Kong, Macau, and Taiwan. Hong Kong and Macau had been colonised by European powers and Taiwan remained under Kuomintang control at the end of the Chinese Civil War. According to Radio Free Asia, the theoretical framework for the "one country, two systems" principle for Hong Kong was first developed by Wang Huning and Wang Bangzuo in an unpublished article in the early 1980s.

=== In the context of Hong Kong ===
Hong Kong was a colony of the United Kingdom, ruled by a governor appointed by the monarch of the United Kingdom, for 156 years from 1841 (except for four years of Japanese occupation during WWII) until 1997, when it was handed over to the Chinese government.

In discussing Hong Kong's future, Deng described the risk of possible instability which might be caused by what he termed as destructive forces both inside and outside Hong Kong. In Deng's view, these destructive forces might create instability both prior to and after Hong Kong's return to China. Deng repeatedly stressed that the central government would need to intervene in Hong Kong affairs from time-to-time. Among other occasions, Deng told Hong Kong delegates to Beijing in 1984 that certain interventions would be necessary, that when turmoil occurs in Hong Kong the central government should intervene, and that it would be necessary to see if interventions would be in the interests of Hong Kongers and Hong Kong's stability and prosperity. In 1988, Deng stated that Hong Kong's political system was neither the British nor American systems and Hong Kong should not import Western political systems in the future.

Prior to Hong Kong's return to China, China and the UK signed the Sino-British Joint Declaration, a treaty which stipulated the drafting and adoption of Hong Kong's organic law Basic Law before the handover. The Hong Kong Basic Law ensured that Hong Kong will be granted autonomy in regard to its capitalist economic system and own currency (the Hong Kong dollar), legal system, human rights, and legislative system as a special administrative region (SAR) of China for 50 years. The current arrangement has permitted Hong Kong to function as its own entity under the name "Hong Kong, China" in many international settings (e.g. the WTO and the Olympics).

During the drafting of the Basic Law, Deng stated that universal suffrage and Western political systems were not appropriate for Hong Kong. Deng also stated that if Hong Kong became a base for anti-mainland China sentiment under the guise of democracy then China's central government should intervene.

The Chinese renminbi is not legal tender in Hong Kong. Likewise, the Hong Kong dollar is not accepted in stores in mainland China. With this arrangement, a permit or special visa (Chinese: 簽注) is required when passing between the borders of Hong Kong and mainland China, and people in Hong Kong hold Hong Kong SAR passports rather than Chinese passports. The official languages are a major factor besides the history of the former colony that has made Hong Kong and mainland China distinct from each other, as Cantonese and English are the most widely used languages in Hong Kong, while Mandarin is the official language of mainland China. The central government in Beijing maintains control over Hong Kong's foreign affairs as well as the legal interpretation of the Basic Law. The latter has led democracy advocates and some Hong Kong residents to argue that the territory has yet to achieve universal suffrage as promised by the Basic Law, leading to mass demonstrations in 2014.

=== In the context of Macau ===
A colony of Portugal for 442 years from 1557, Macau was returned to the Chinese government in 1999. In the Joint Declaration on the Question of Macau, the drafting and adoption of Macau's organic law before its return was foreseen. Like Hong Kong, a basic law would ensure that Macau retained its economic system, currency (the Macanese pataca), legal system (which is based on Portuguese civil law), legislative system, and human rights for 50 years, as a special administrative region (SAR) of China. The agreement has permitted Macau to function as its own entity in many international settings (e.g. WTO) rather than as a part of China.

As Macau has its own currency, the Chinese renminbi is not legal tender in Macau; the pataca is also not accepted in stores in China.

=== In the context of Taiwan ===
In addition to the Hong Kong and Macau contexts, Deng proposed the principle's applicability to Chinese unification, but the government of Taiwan has consistently rejected the proposal as recently as December 2023. According to polls conducted by Taiwan's Mainland Affairs Council in 2025, over 80 percent of Taiwan reject "one country, two systems".

== Application to Hong Kong and Macau ==
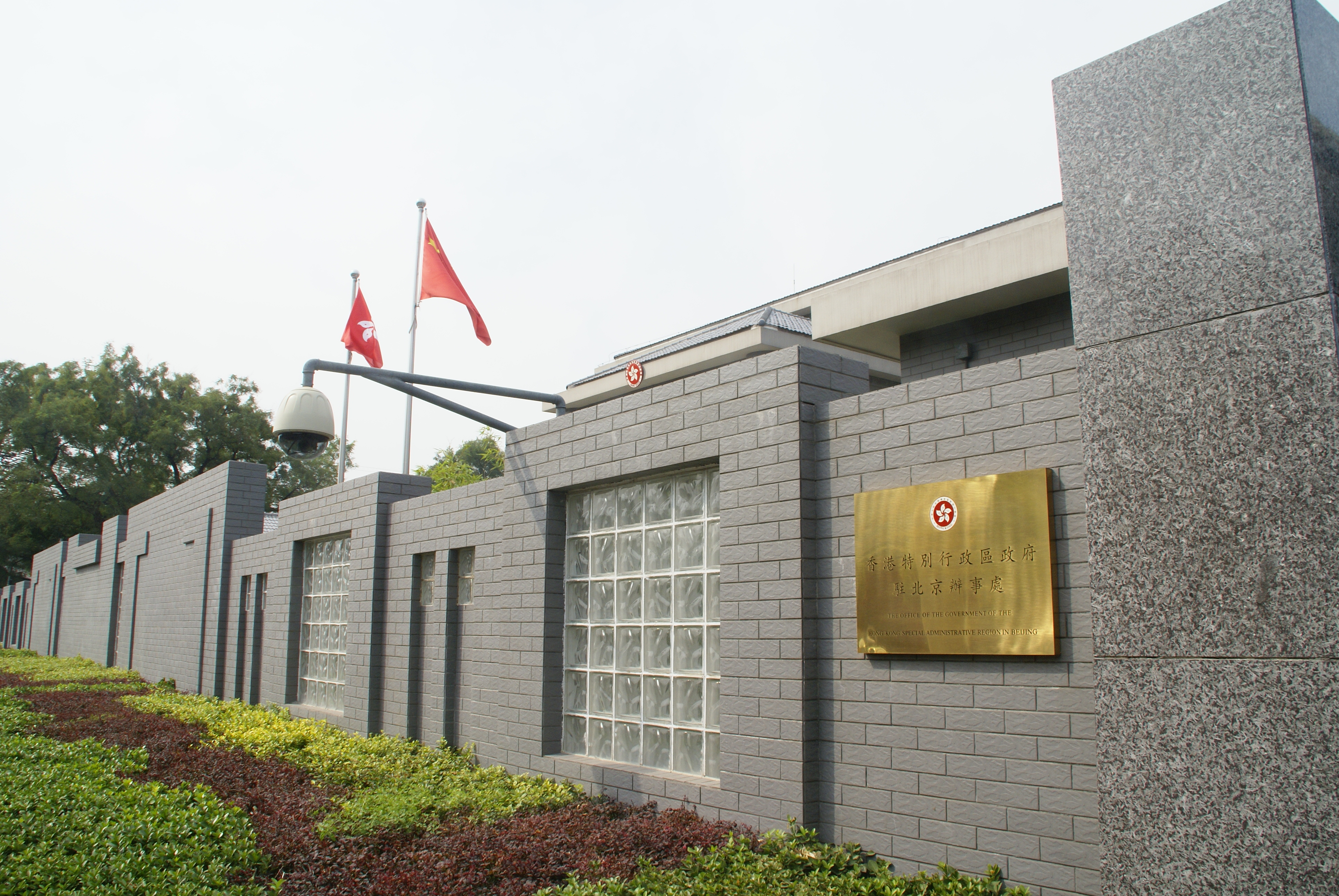
Office of the Government of the Hong Kong Special Administrative Region in Beijing

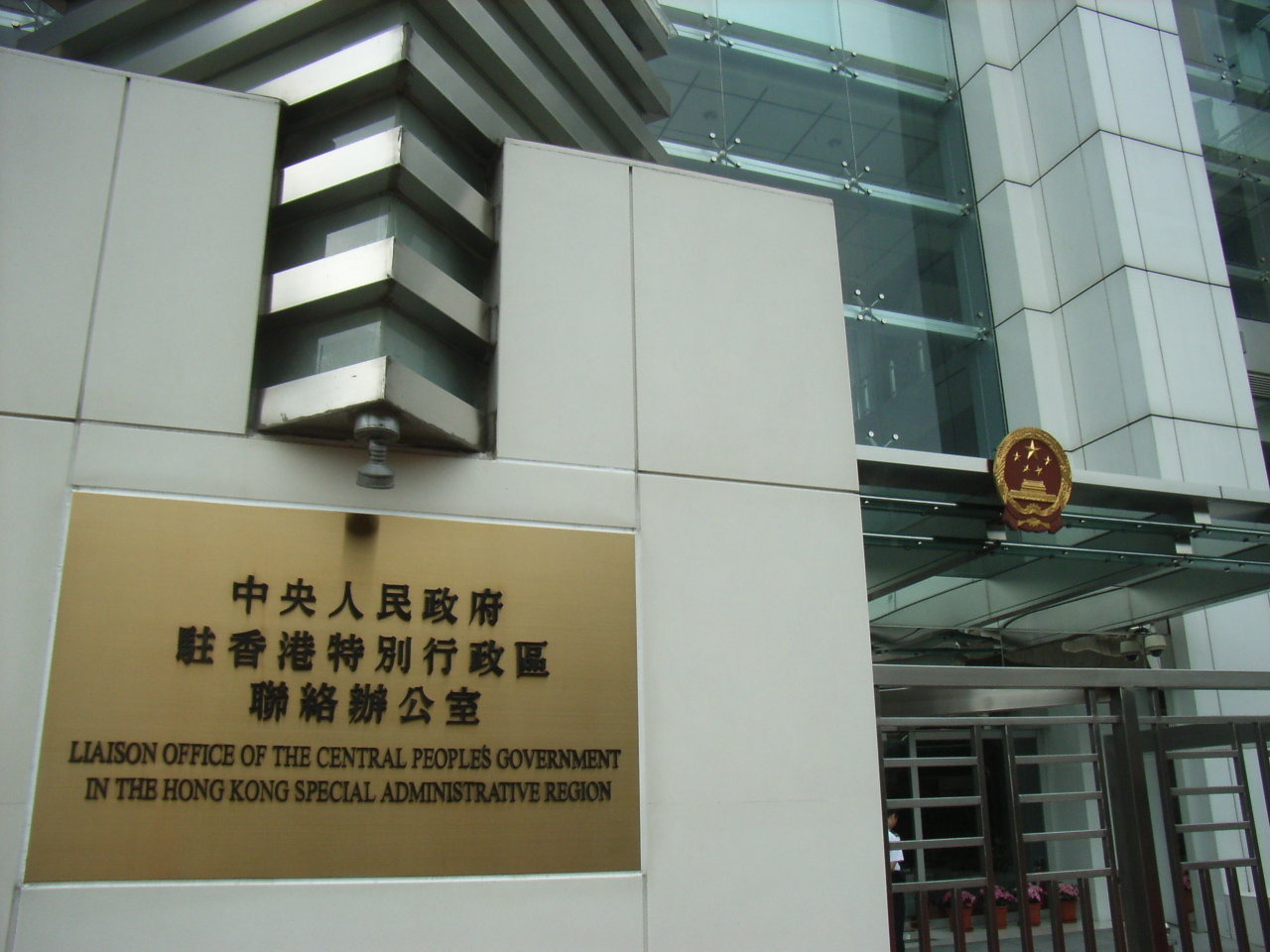
Liaison Office of the Central People's Government in the Hong Kong Special Administrative Region

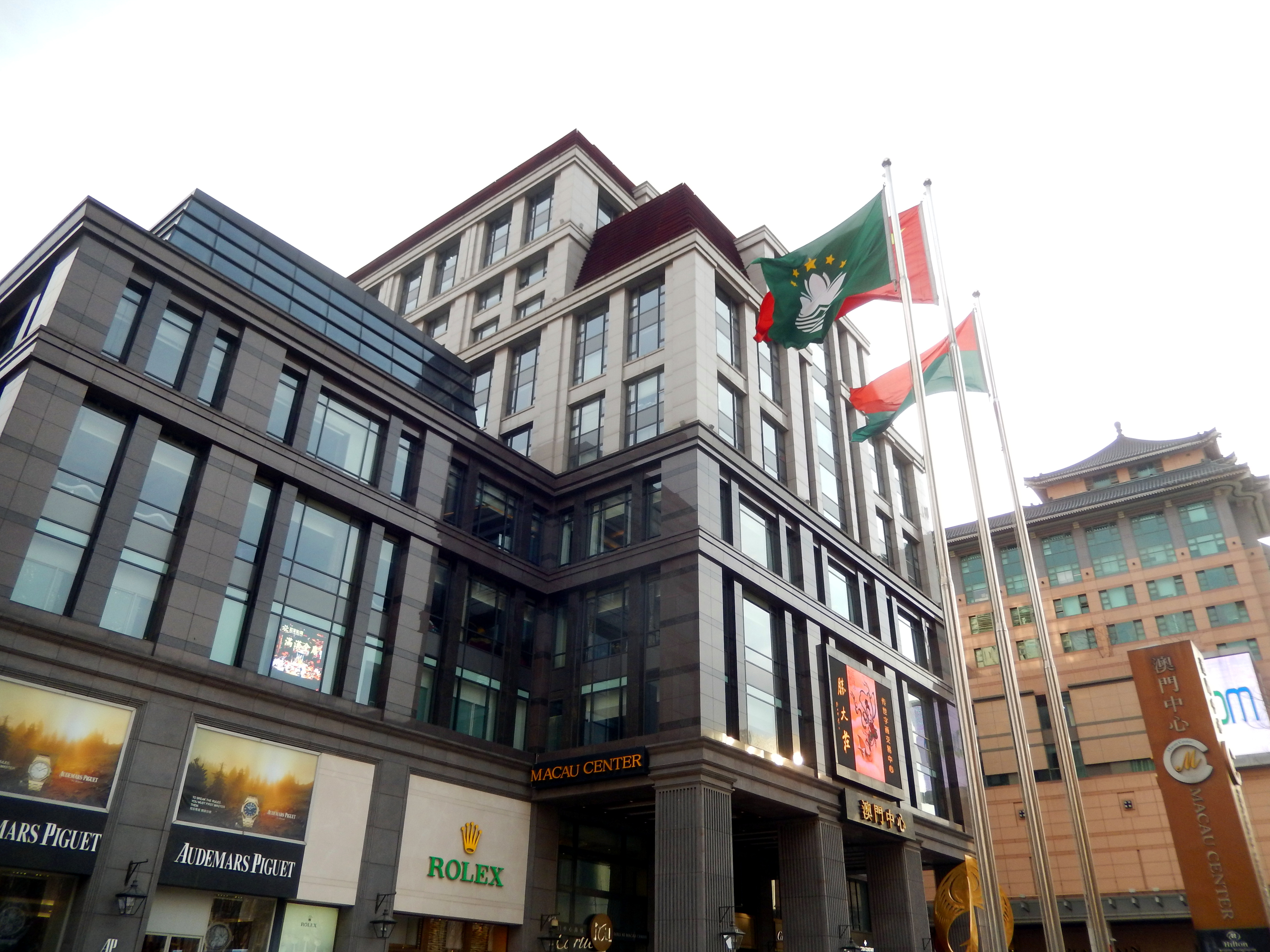
Office of the Macau Special Administrative Region in Beijing

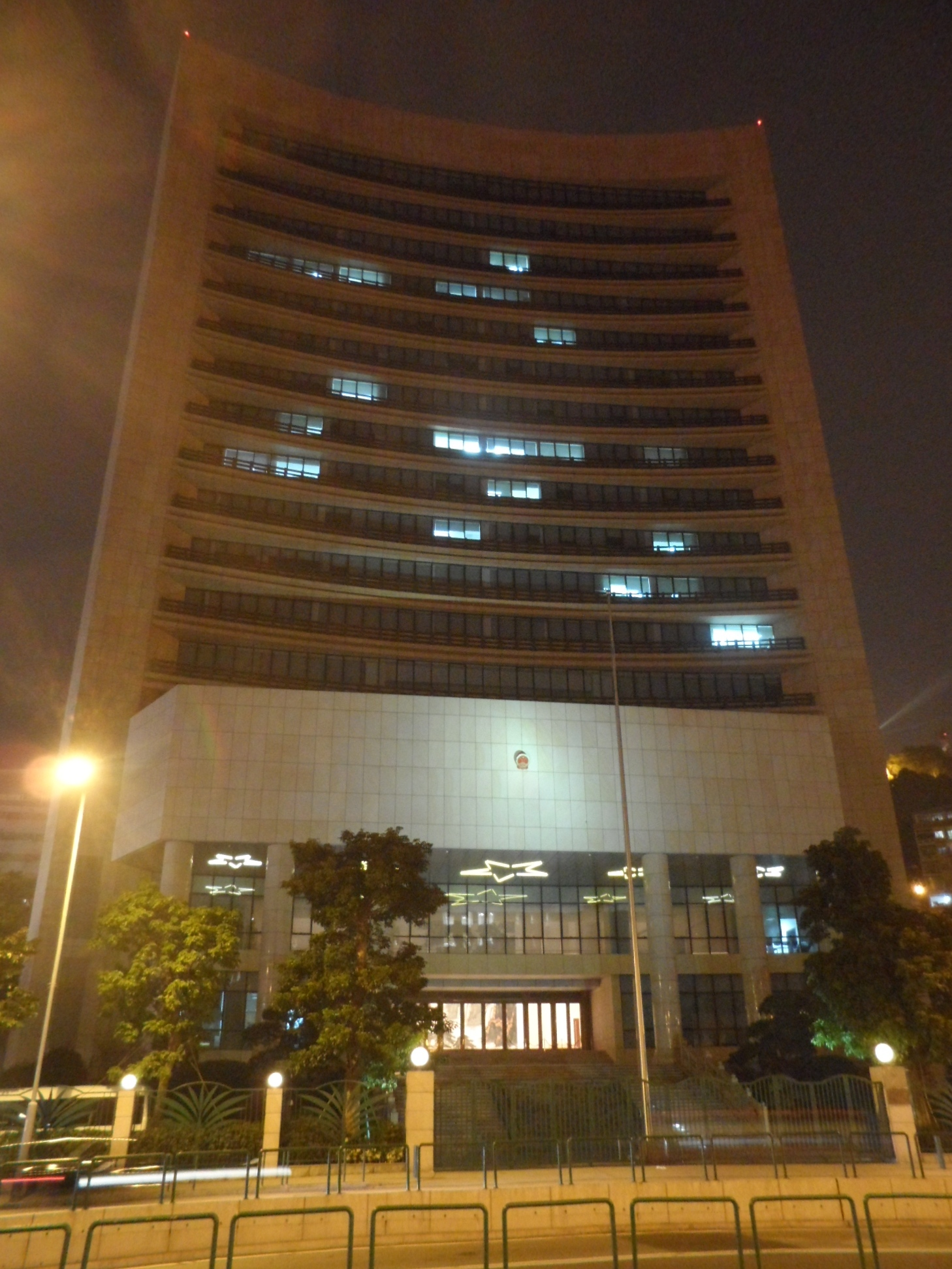
Liaison Office of the Central People's Government in the Macao Special Administrative Region

Chinese paramount leader Deng Xiaoping proposed the principle during negotiation with British prime minister Margaret Thatcher over the expiration of the United Kingdom's lease on the New Territories (including New Kowloon) of Hong Kong in 1997. The same principle was proposed in talks with Portugal about Macau.

The principle is that, upon reunification, despite the practice of socialism in mainland China, both Hong Kong and Macau, which were colonies of the United Kingdom and Portugal respectively, could retain their established system under a high degree of autonomy.

Chapter 1, Article 5 of the Hong Kong Basic Law, the constitutional document of the Hong Kong Special Administrative Region, reads:

The socialist system and policies shall not be practiced in the Hong Kong Special Administrative Region, and the previous capitalist system and way of life shall remain unchanged for 50 years.

The establishment of these regions, called "special administrative regions" (SARs), is authorised by Article 31 of the Constitution of China, which states that the state may establish SARs when necessary, and that the systems to be instituted in them shall be prescribed by law enacted by the National People's Congress in light of the specific conditions.

The SARs of Hong Kong and Macau were formally established on 1 July 1997 and 20 December 1999 respectively, immediately after the People's Republic of China (PRC) assumed sovereignty over these respective regions.

=== Framework ===
The two SARs of Hong Kong and Macau are responsible for their domestic affairs including, but not limited to, the judiciary and courts of final appeal, immigration and customs, public finance, currencies and extradition. The SARs are also exempt from mainland laws mandating the use of simplified characters in publishing and Mandarin in public education and most broadcasting. The diplomatic relations and military defence of the two SARs however, is the responsibility of the Central People's Government in Beijing.

Hong Kong continues using English common law while Macau continues using the Portuguese civil law system.

=== Names ===
When the two regions have their own membership in international organisations (such as the WTO and the Paralympics), both regions are mandated to use the name "Hong Kong, China" or "Macao, China" (Note: In practice, Macau sometimes instead uses "Macau, China".) instead of "Hong Kong" or "Macau"/"Macao", as stipulated several times under Chapter VII ("External Affairs") of both regions' Basic Laws.

For example, in Trade Policy Review documents between Hong Kong and the WTO, the documents use "Hong Kong, China" throughout even in prose. When a short name is used, it uses the acronym "HKC" and never "Hong Kong" or "HK" standalone. Similarly, in Trade Policy Review documents between Macau and the WTO, "Macao, China" is used in prose throughout and the only short name used is the acronym "MSAR".

=== Potential extension ===
Several high level members of the government have expressed a potential extension of the system beyond 2047 for Hong Kong. In January 2020, Carrie Lam stated that "My view is this: as long as we persist with the "One Country, Two Systems" principle, push forward the implementation of 'One Country, Two Systems' and have a full understanding and implementation of the principle... then we have adequate reason to believe that 'One Country, Two Systems' will be implemented smoothly and in the long term, and it will not change after 2047."

Additionally, in a June 2020 online webinar to campaign for the National Security Law, Zhang Xiaoming said that the National Security Law would ensure that the freedoms granted to the city can be extended beyond 2047. However, neither Carrie Lam or Zhang Xiaoming have promised such an extension or laid out concrete steps or goals in order for it to happen.

In October 2021, Carrie Lam reiterated that she believed the system would be extended beyond 2047, stating "Anybody would seriously ask: why do we have to change it? But of course, something more concrete will have to come out later on to give the needed assurance about the continuation of the common law system, the monetary system, the professional recognition system, maybe some land leases."

In March 2022, Xia Baolong, head of the Hong Kong and Macau Affairs Office, said that after 2047, the "one country, two systems" could be extended by another 50 years, until 2097. In July 2022, Leung Chun-ying, former chief executive, said that he expected the system to be extended past 2047. On 1 July 2022, during a visit to Hong Kong, General Secretary of the Chinese Communist Party Xi Jinping made a promise that the system is a long-term policy. In February 2024, Xia Baolong said that the system would be kept permanently.

== Implementation in Hong Kong ==
=== Degree of autonomy ===
As a British colony, Hong Kong was neither democratic nor autonomous. After Britain returned Hong Kong to China in 1997, Beijing promised that Hong Kong citizens would be free to elect their local government. However, the Basic Law does not have a clear timetable for when universal suffrage is to be achieved, ultimately stating that a full vote by the populace and universal suffrage must be reached before the end of the 50-year transition according to Article 45.

In the year after the handover, surveys showed high levels of satisfaction with Beijing's hands-off relationship with the former colony.

The year before, the Provisional Legislative Council passed laws restricting the right of abode, leading to a case brought against the government, which ended in a loss for the government in the Hong Kong Court of Final Appeal in 1999. The government then took its case to the National People's Congress. The legal establishment expressed its disapproval of the act Martin Lee described as "giving away" Hong Kong's autonomy with a silent march. Polls showed the events had depressed the public's confidence in the government, despite the fact that most were in favour of the government's stance over that of the court's.

On 10 June 2014, China's central government released a white paper describing its view of comprehensive jurisdiction over Hong Kong. The white paper stated that Hong Kong's high degree of autonomy is not an inherent power, but rather one which exists solely through the authorization of the central government. The white paper's release ignited criticism from many people in Hong Kong, who said that the Communist leadership was reneging on its pledges to abide by the "one country, two systems" policy that allows for a democratic, autonomous Hong Kong under Beijing's rule.

During the 2014 Hong Kong protests, students demanded more political freedom in direct response to the "831 decision" of the NPCSC. The participants demanded freedom of choice, electoral freedom, democracy and, in particular, they wanted to participate in the elections of the head of the administration of Hong Kong. The name "umbrella movement" originated because the students protected themselves with umbrellas from the pepper spray of the police. Thus, umbrellas became the symbol of this movement. In 2016, Joshua Wong, Alex Chow and Nathan Law, student leaders of the protests, were charged for their roles in the protests and found guilty.

=== Moral and National Education controversy ===
It was officially announced in September 2012 that the Hong Kong government would introduce compulsory "national, moral and civic education" in all non-international primary and secondary schools to strengthen "national identity awareness and nurture patriotism towards China". According to an academic research paper, the current school curriculum in Hong Kong projects a "dual sense of identity": "Chineseness" and "Hongkongeseness" and notably, this has created strong public activism by Hong Kong pre- and post-1997. However, the new curriculum includes "general civic education" and lessons meant to increase students' appreciation of China. This announcement led to 10 days of protests, with up to 120,000 protesters each day, due to concerns of Hong Kong losing autonomy. In response, the chief executive at the time, CY Leung, chose to remove the idea of compulsory teaching, meaning that schools could freely decide if they would teach the subject. Despite CY Leung's decision, new chief executive Carrie Lam, who took over on 1 July 2017, has prioritised the topic of national education, by placing importance on "instilling patriotism in pupils". Furthermore, in August 2017, Christine Choi Yuk-Lin was appointed by the government as the under-secretary of the Education Bureau. She "has former connections with the pro-Beijing Federation of Education Workers" (SCMP article A). This led to more than 17,000 people signing a petition opposing Yuk-lin having the position. Chinese Communist Party general secretary Xi Jinping also announced during his visit to Hong Kong in July 2017 the need for an enhancement and boost of "national history and culture" in Hong Kong education.

=== Causeway Bay booksellers case ===
The disappearances of five staff at Causeway Bay Books – an independent publisher and bookstore – in October to December 2015 precipitated an international outcry as cross-border abductions were widely suspected. Although at least two of them disappeared in mainland China, one in Thailand, one member was last seen in Hong Kong, but apparently had found his way across the Chinese land border in Shenzhen without the necessary travel documents. The unprecedented disappearance of a person in Hong Kong, and the bizarre events surrounding it, shocked the city and crystallised international concern over the suspected abduction of Hong Kong citizens by Chinese public security bureau officials and their likely rendition, in violation of several articles of the Basic Law and the one country, two systems principle.

On 16 June 2016, shortly after he returned to Hong Kong, Lam Wing-kee gave a long press conference in which he detailed the circumstances surrounding his eight-month detention, and describing how his confession and those of his associates had been scripted and stage-managed. Lam implicated the involvement of the Central Investigation Team, which is under direct control of the highest level of the Beijing leadership. His revelations stunned Hong Kong and made headlines worldwide, prompting a flurry of counter-accusations and denials from mainland authorities and supporters.

=== Hong Kong National Party ban ===
On 17 July 2018, the Hong Kong Police Force served the party convener a notice under the Societies Ordinance, seeking to ban the Hong Kong National Party (HKNP) for sedition, on grounds of national security with respect to Chinese territorial integrity. The party and its convener Andy Chan submitted their case against being outlawed. Ten days later, in an unprecedented move, Secretary for Security John Lee on 24 September 2018 officially banned the party on national security grounds.

The ban prohibited anyone who claims to be a HKNP member, or is found to provide aid to the party in any way, under the threat of being fined and jailed for up to two years. The definition of "providing aid" to the party and the two leaders were not made clear. Chan's lawyers wrote to the Department of Justice seeking an assurance that providing legal assistance to him would not be regarded as providing assistance to the HKNP, but that assurance was not forthcoming.

=== Victor Mallet controversy ===
In August, a controversy erupted in 2018 when the Foreign Correspondents' Club of Hong Kong (FCC) hosted a lunchtime talk with Andy Chan, convener of the Hong Kong Independence Party (HKIP) to take place on 14 August. Victor Mallet, vice-chairman of the press organisation, chaired the session. The governments of China and Hong Kong had called for the cancellation of the talk, because the issue of independence supposedly crossed one of the "bottom lines" on national sovereignty. After a visit to Bangkok, Mallet was denied a working visa by the Hong Kong government. Mallet was subjected to a four-hour interrogation by immigration officers on his return from Thailand on Sunday 7 October before he was finally allowed to enter Hong Kong on a seven-day tourist visa.

In the absence of an official explanation, Mallet's visa rejection was widely seen to be retribution for his role in chairing the Andy Chan talk which the FCC refused to call off. Secretary for Security John Lee insisted the ban on Mallet was unrelated to press freedom, but declined to explain the decision. The incident caused a furious debate over restrictions to freedoms that were supposedly protected by the Sino-British Joint Declaration under "one country, two systems".

=== Extradition bill and Hong Kong 2019–2020 protests ===
In April 2019, an extradition bill was proposed in Hong Kong inciting mass protests. The new law identifies that those who are suspects of serious crimes could be sent to China. This was initiated due to a murder suspect fleeing from Taiwan to Hong Kong in 2018. He was accused of murdering his pregnant 20 year old girlfriend, thus Hong Kong authorities were asked by Taiwan to extradite the man. Hong Kong, however, did not concur with this demand and could not prosecute him as Hong Kong does not have any form of an extradition agreement with Taiwan. In terms of the Extradition Law, it was claimed that decisions would be made on a "case-by-case basis by the Chief Executive", in addition to Hong Kong courts making final decisions on extradition requests. For this reason, those accused of crimes based on politics or religion would not be extradited, and the new law would purely be "dealing with cross border crimes and transnational crimes" that carries a minimum seven-years sentence, as Carrie Lam stated in her speech on Monday 10 June. However, many Hong Kong people claim that this is another example of Hong Kong losing its autonomy. There has been criticism that this law would mean that suspects would be susceptible to many practices under the Chinese judicial system that is not present in the Hong Kong judicial system: arbitrary detention, unfair trial and torture. Michael DeGolyer, a researcher at Baptist University of Hong Kong, told Al Jazeera that Hong Kong people fear lack of judicial independence as the current judiciary system "is seen as guaranteeing a measure of protection from the government on the mainland".

There has been a widespread response opposing the law: nationally and internationally. Criticism, petitions and protests have incorporated many parts of society, including doctors, lawyers, teachers and housewives. On 9 June there were an estimated one million people protesting across Hong Kong, making it the biggest protest since the handover. Additionally, concern was displayed internationally: in Britain, Canada, the European Union and the United States. The US congressional commission argued in May 2019 that the extradition bill makes "Hong Kong more susceptible to China's political coercion and further erodes Hong Kong's autonomy". China's foreign ministry has rebutted these concerns by claiming them "attempts to politicise the Hong Kong government proposal and interference in China's internal affairs".

Due to this negative response nationally and internationally, on 4 September 2019, Carrie Lam formally announced that the extradition bill would be withdrawn. Despite this, fear of the loss of Hong Kong autonomy remains. Protests continued until the outbreak of the COVID-19 pandemic in January 2020 and were further halted by the passing of the National People's Congress decision on Hong Kong national security legislation.

=== 2020 national security legislation ===
A draft national security bill was submitted on 22 May 2020 to China's national parliament, the National People's Congress, bypassing the HK legislative. A National People's Congress official reported as saying it was exercising "constitutional power" to create a new legal framework and enforcement mechanism to guarantee national security in Hong Kong. On 30 June 2020, the Standing Committee of the National People's Congress (NPCSC) passed the national security law for Hong Kong unanimously and listed it under Annex III of the Basic Law, bypassing Hong Kong approval. The Hong Kong Bar Association (HKBA) disputed the constitutionality of enacting the law through inclusion in Annex III of the Basic Law in May 2020.

On 30 May 2020, the president of the United States, Donald Trump, in a White House press conference, officially declared that the United States would be ending special treatments afforded to Hong Kong as outlined in the United States-Hong Kong Policy Act, due to China replacing the promised formula of "one country, two systems" with "one country, one system", and threatened that the United States would take further actions on Hong Kong in response to the national security law. On 14 July 2020, President Trump signed Executive Order 13936, pursuant to the Hong Kong Autonomy Act passed by the US Congress, ending Hong Kong's special trade privileges.

According to Victoria Tin-bor Hui, writing in The Diplomat, the national security legislation is being used to erode civil and legal protections on the way to "establishing a police state" in Hong Kong.

== Implementation in Macau ==
=== Macau and mainland China relations ===
Macau has not seen outbreaks of protests and civil unrest that have occurred in Hong Kong. According to Jason Chao, a former president of the New Macau Association (a pro-democracy party), Macau differed from Hong Kong as Macau does not wish for freedom and autonomy. Instead, the majority of Macau's population are pro-China. A reason for this is because approximately half of the 600,000 people living in Macau are Chinese immigrants. In December 2019, Li Zhanshu, chairman of the NPCSC, claimed that there is a "strong sense of international identity" in Macau. In Chinese Communist Party general secretary Xi Jinping's first official speech in Macau in December 2019 marking the 20th anniversary, he proclaimed Macau as "a gorgeous chapter in the short history of the one country, two systems experiment". Chief executive of Macau, Ho Iat Seng, said: "Macau will be an example of China's reunification," and Xi has agreed, by placing emphasis on the "Macau Model" as Macau has correctly followed the "one country, two system" agreement. As a reward for Macau's peaceful behaviour and lack of anti-government protests, Xi Jinping has given Macau more Chinese land from Hengqin Island. This is to enable Macau to further develop their education and healthcare system, in addition to physically integrating Macau more with China. Under the "One Country, Two Systems" policy, Macau has an independent legal and financial system, allowing the legal development of the gambling industry and opening up to the international market, which has led to its rapid rise as a global gambling hub and significant economic growth and international influence.

== Comparisons ==
Body	Hong Kong	Macau	China (national level)
Constitutional Document	Hong Kong Basic Law (national law of China, subordinate to the Chinese constitution)	Macao Basic Law (national law of China, subordinate to the Chinese constitution)	Constitution of China
Final Authority of Constitutional Interpretation & Review	NPC Standing Committee	NPC Standing Committee	NPC Standing Committee
Supreme leader of State	General Secretary of the Chinese Communist Party	General Secretary of the Chinese Communist Party	General Secretary of the Chinese Communist Party
Representative of State / Territory	Chief Executive of Hong Kong	Chief Executive of Macau	President of the People's Republic of China
Head of Government / Territory	Chief Executive of Hong Kong	Chief Executive of Macau	Premier of the People's Republic of China
Executive	Executive Council of Hong Kong	Executive Council of Macau	State Council
Legislative	Legislative Council	Legislative Assembly	National People's Congress (NPC); NPC Standing Committee
Judiciary	Hong Kong Court of Final Appeal	Court of Final Appeal of Macau	Supreme People's Court
Legal Supervisory or Prosecution	Department of Justice	Procurator General	Supreme People's Procuratorate
Police	Hong Kong Police Force (part of Hong Kong Disciplined Services)	Public Security Police Force of Macau; Directorate of Judiciary Police (zh) (parts of Macau Security Force)	People's Police (of Public Security, State Security, Justice, Court and Procuratorate systems); People's Armed Police
Military	PLA Hong Kong Garrison	PLA Macau Garrison	People's Liberation Army (PLA); People's Armed Police; Militia
Currency	Hong Kong dollar	Macanese pataca	Renminbi (Chinese yuan)
Official Language(s)	Chinese (traditional), (simplified), (Cantonese), (Mandarin), English	Chinese (traditional), (simplified), (Cantonese), (Mandarin), Portuguese	Standard Chinese (Putonghua) (simplified)
Foreign relations	limited under "Hong Kong, China"	limited under "Macau, China"	full rights
Principal Agency in Foreign Affairs	Office of the Commissioner of the Ministry of Foreign Affairs of China in Hong Kong	Office of the Commissioner of the Ministry of Foreign Affairs of China in Macau	PRC Ministry of Foreign Affairs
Citizenship	Chinese citizenship	Chinese citizenship	Chinese citizenship
Proof of Residency	Right of abode	Right of abode	Hukou
Passport	Hong Kong SAR passport	Macau SAR passport	Chinese passport
Passport Issuing Authorities	Immigration Department	Identification Department (zh)	National Immigration Administration; Ministry of Foreign Affairs; Diplomatic missions
Customs	Customs and Excise Department	Macao Customs Service (zh)	General Administration of Customs

== Proposed application onto Taiwan ==
It has been claimed that the system was originally designed for Taiwan in order for it to be unified with the PRC; the PRC's Ministry of Foreign Affairs further claims that Mao Zedong originated the idea of one country, two systems for Taiwan in May 1960. Since then, the PRC government has repeatedly proposed the application of the one country, two systems principle for Taiwan.

The ROC government continues to refuse the suggestion of one country, two systems; the ROC's Mainland Affairs Council cited 218 cases between 1997 and 2017 that they claim to be breaches of the principle in Hong Kong. Of the nationally or locally represented political parties in Taiwan, only the right-wing to far-right New Party (which published its own proposal in August 2019) and left-wing Labor Party who both only have 1 council member in the country, support unification under one country, two systems. While the current main opposition party Kuomintang (KMT) is generally seen as pro-unification, it rejects unification under one country, two systems.

A new policy based on the 1992 Consensus was emphasised during the Pan-Blue visits to mainland China in April 2005 as well as subsequent major cross-strait exchanges under President Ma Ying-jeou, whose pro-unification KMT won the 2008 Taiwanese presidential election.

=== Post-2019 developments ===
In January 2019, CCP General Secretary Xi Jinping announced an open letter to Taiwan proposing development of a one country, two systems formula unique to Taiwan, which he called the "Two Systems" Taiwan Plan ("两制"台湾方案; "Liǎngzhì" Táiwān Fāngàn), for eventual unification. President Tsai Ing-wen responded to Xi in a January 2019 speech by stating that Taiwan rejected one country, two systems, and that because Beijing equated the 1992 Consensus with one country, two systems, Taiwan rejected it as well. Tsai expressed her solidarity with Hong Kong protesters, remarking that Taiwan's democracy was hard-earned and had to be guarded and renewed. Pledging that as long as she was Taiwan's president, she would never accept one country, two systems, Tsai cited what she considered to be the constant and rapid deterioration of democracy in Hong Kong over the previous 20 years.

Following the landslide defeat of the KMT in the 2020 Taiwanese presidential election, KMT chairman Johnny Chiang rejected the one country, two systems as a feasible model for Taiwan. In 2021, the KMT platform under newly elected chairman Eric Chu also continued to include the 1992 Consensus while rejecting one country, two systems.

The German Marshall Fund observed in 2024 that Xi's 2019 instruction for PRC researchers to develop a unique "Two Systems" Taiwan Plan was a tacit admission that the principle as applied to Hong Kong and Macau was ill-suited to Taiwan's situation. As of 2024, a detailed framework of the "Two Systems" Taiwan Plan has not been announced.

A May 2025 white paper published by the PRC's State Council Information Office outlining their official positions on national sovereignty, China's National Security in the New Era, proclaimed that "Taiwan is a province of China" while also calling for implementation of the PRC's Comprehensive Plan for Resolving the Taiwan Problem in the New Era, which calls for the PRC to adhere to the one country, two systems principle during cross-strait talks with Taiwanese political parties to resolve the "unresolved nature of China's civil war".

=== Alternative proposals ===
In 1987, then-president of the Republic of China Chiang Ching-kuo counter-proposed with the alternative of "one country, better system" (一国良制; 一國良制; Yīguó liángzhì).

During his visit to Beijing in March 2012, former KMT Chairman Wu Po-hsiung proposed a "one country, two areas" (一国两区; 一國兩區; yīguóliǎngqū) framework to govern cross-strait relations.

== Comparison to status of Tibet ==
Jiang (2008) notes that the concept of "one country, two systems" is based on the Seventeen Point Agreement for the Peaceful Liberation of Tibet signed in 1951, and that its mechanism is similar to how the Qing emperor integrated new territories it had conquered by permitting local elites in these regions to continue to enjoy power for a time and to exercise autonomy without apparently threatening distinct local customs. As the concept was merely a "tactical and transitional arrangement", a point of view argues that the territory of Hong Kong will gradually experience the same fate as Tibet since 1959 – forced assimilation and tight direct control by the central government. Over time, full assimilation, and abolition of local autonomy, would take place in a manner "illustrative of a similar Chinese imperial expansionist mentalité".

The 14th Dalai Lama's 2005 proposal for "high-level autonomy" for Tibet, evolved from a position of advocating Tibetan independence, has been compared to "one country, two systems". He has said that his proposals should be acceptable to China because "one country, two systems" is accommodated for in the Chinese Constitution. State media rejected this claim, pointing out that "one country, two systems" was designed for the capitalist social systems of Hong Kong and Macau, which had never existed in Tibet. In 2012, Dalai Lama mentioned again that the Seventeen Point Agreement was signed in the spirit of "one country, two systems".

== One country, two systems proposals for other countries ==
Muhammad Cohen, writing for Asia Times, suggests the "one country, two systems" formula is a possible solution to the Israeli–Palestinian conflict.

In 2017, North Korea suggested the "one country, two systems" formula to bring about Korean reunification, through a confederation of two systems within one country. China has also promoted the idea; the difference between North Korea's motivation and China's is that North Korea seeks to maintain two separate governments, while China seeks gradual unification as it wishes to bring stability to the Korean peninsula with one centralised government.

Irish Foreign Minister Simon Coveney said the arrangement linking Hong Kong with China could be a possible solution for addressing the fate of Northern Ireland after Brexit. The border between the EU member state Republic of Ireland and British-ruled Northern Ireland is becoming an increasing concern in talks with the United Kingdom, with Dublin demanding that the frontier remain completely open, to avoid endangering the peace process.

== See also ==
- 1992 consensus
- Administrative divisions of the People's Republic of China
- Autonomous administrative division
- Democracy in China
- Federacy
- Hong Kong–Mainland conflict
- Law of Hong Kong
- One country, one system
- One Country Two Systems Research Institute
- Special Economic Zone
