= One country, one system =

One country, one system (Chinese: 一国一制; pinyin: yīguó yīzhì) is a principle that means that the People's Republic of China governs Hong Kong, Macau, and Taiwan in the same political and judicial system as the mainland, unlike one country, two systems; meaning the abolition of the Special Administrative Region and direct rule by the Central People's Government after the unification of Hong Kong, Macau or the future unification with Taiwan. Some outside pro-Beijing figures have expressed their support to the implementation of one country, one system in Hong Kong.

== History ==
=== Hong Kong ===
According to the Public Opinion Programme of the University of Hong Kong (HKUPOP), Hong Kong people's identification with the Chinese people had a slow upward trend after the handover of Hong Kong in 1997 and up to 2006, which can be attributed to the completion of the handover of Hong Kong's sovereignty in a conflict-free manner, which symbolizes the successful implementation of "one country, two systems", the success of China's bid for hosting the 2008 Summer Olympics, the economic downturn at the early stage of Hong Kong's handover, and the booming economic development of mainland China.

Following the 2008 Summer Olympics, political and cultural identification with mainland China among Hong Kong residents began to decline, influenced by incidents such as the 2008 Chinese milk scandal, misuse of Sichuan earthquake relief funds, Guangzhou Television Cantonese controversy, and the suppression of dissidents including Nobel laureate Liu Xiaobo. Tensions increased after Xi Jinping became General Secretary of the Chinese Communist Party in 2012, particularly over demands for universal suffrage in the election of Hong Kong's Chief Executive, which culminated in Umbrella Revolution in 2014. In the years that followed, localist and pro-independence groups gained visibility, and public debate over the effectiveness of the "one country, two systems" framework intensified. While many in Hong Kong expressed dissatisfaction with its implementation, the central government continued to describe the arrangement as successful.

In 2016, pro-Beijing writer Chris Wat (屈穎妍) submitted a letter to Zhang Dejiang, then chairman of the Standing Committee of the National People's Congress, urging the adoption of "one country, one system". Later that year, during a visit to Hong Kong, Zhang stated at a public dinner on 18 May that "one country, two systems" and the Basic Law must be respected. He emphasized that the principle should not be questioned or denied, but did not address proposals for "one country, one system."

In 2017, Lam Fung (林峰), Associate Dean of the City University of Hong Kong School of Law, wrote that the adoption of "one country, one system" in 2047 was legally possible, but he considered the continuation of "one country, two systems" a more reasonable option for the Central Government. In the same year, Wang Zhenmin (王振民), Dean of the Tsinghua University Law School, argued in a book that viewing Hong Kong's future as either "one country, one system" or independence was a misunderstanding. Also in May 2017, Tam Yiu-chung, then deputy director of the Committee on Social Affairs and the Rule of Law of the National Committee of the Chinese People's Political Consultative Conference, stated in an interview with Wu Xiaoli that if Hong Kong faced political and economic failure after the end of "one country, two systems", independence would not be possible. He suggested that the territory's only remaining path would be integration under "one country, one system", though this was not what most residents preferred.

Controversy over China's implementation of de facto one country, one system has been repeatedly raised by critics outside of China since Xi Jinping became the General Secretary in 2012; on June 30, 2020, the Standing the 13th National People's Congress (NPC) passed the 2020 Hong Kong national security law. The NPC's legislative action aroused doubts in the West, including the United States government, that Hong Kong's "original one country, two systems had become [de facto] one country, one system".

== See also ==
- Centralisation
