= Special administrative regions of China =

Province-level autonomous subdivisions of the People's Republic of China

Special administrative regions (Note: simplified Chinese: 特别行政区; traditional Chinese: 特別行政區; pinyin: Tèbié Xíngzhèngqū; Jyutping: dak6 bit6 hang4 zing3 keoi1)
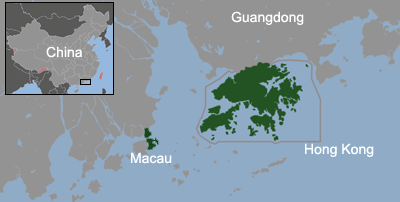
- Category: One country, two systems
- Location: China
- Number: 2 (Hong Kong and Macau)
- Populations: 7,858,800
- Areas: 2,870.27 km^{2} (1,108.22 sq mi)
- Government: Government of Hong Kong, Government of Macau

Special Administrative Region(s) of the People's Republic of China

Chinese name
- Traditional Chinese: 中華人民共和國特別行政區
- Simplified Chinese: 中华人民共和国特别行政区
- Cantonese Yale: Jūng'wàh Yàhnmàhn Guhng'wòhgwok Dahkbiht Hàngjingkēui
- Postal: Chunghwa Jenmin Kunghokuo Tepieh Hsingchengchu
Transcriptions
Standard Mandarin
- Hanyu Pinyin: Zhōnghuá Rénmín Gònghéguó Tèbié Xíngzhèngqū
- Gwoyeu Romatzyh: Jonghwa Renmin Gonqhergwo Tehbye Shyngjenqchiu
- Wade–Giles: Chung¹-hua² Jên²-min² Kung⁴-ho²-kuo² Tʻê⁴-pieh² Hsing²-chêng⁴-chʻü¹
- IPA: [tʰɤ̂.pjě ɕǐŋ.ʈʂə̂ŋ.tɕʰý]
Yue: Cantonese
- Yale Romanization: Jūng'wàh Yàhnmàhn Guhng'wòhgwok Dahkbiht Hàngjingkēui
- Jyutping: Dak6bit6 Hang4zing3keoi1
- IPA: [tɐ̀k̚.pìːt̚ hɐ̭ŋ.tsēːŋ.kʰɵ́y]

Portuguese name
- Portuguese: Regiões Administrativas Especiais da República Popular da China

The special administrative regions (SAR) of the People's Republic of China are one of four types of province-level divisions of the People's Republic of China directly affiliated with the Central People's Government (State Council). As a region, they possess the highest degree of autonomy from China's central government. However, despite the relative autonomy that the Central People's Government offers the special administrative regions, the National People's Congress and its Standing Committee remain capable of enforcing laws for the special administrative regions.

The legal basis for the establishment of SAR's, unlike the other administrative divisions of China, is provided for by Article 31, rather than Article 30, of the Constitution of China of 1982. Article 31 reads: "The state may establish special administrative regions when necessary. The systems to be instituted in special administrative regions shall be prescribed by law enacted by the National People's Congress in the light of the specific conditions".

At present, there are two SARs established by the Constitution: Hong Kong and Macau. These former British and Portuguese territories were transferred to China in 1997 and 1999 respectively, following the Sino-British and Sino-Portuguese Joint Declarations signed in 1984 and 1987, respectively. Pursuant to their Joint Declarations, which are binding inter-state treaties registered with the United Nations, and their Basic laws, the Chinese SARs "shall enjoy a high degree of autonomy".

The provision to establish special administrative regions appeared in the constitution in 1982, in anticipation of the talks with the United Kingdom over the question of the sovereignty of Hong Kong. It was envisioned as the model for the eventual unification with Taiwan and other islands, where the Republic of China has resided since 1949.

Under the one country, two systems principle, the Chinese Central Government is responsible for the diplomatic, military and other state-level affairs of the two SARs. Both two SARs continue to possess their own multi-party legislatures, legal systems, police forces, separate customs territory, immigration policies, left-hand traffic, official languages, academic and educational systems, representation on certain international bodies and representation in international competitions, and other aspects that fall within the autonomous level.

Special administrative regions should not be confused with special economic zones, which are areas in which special economic laws apply to promote trade and investments. The Wolong Special Administrative Region in Sichuan province is a nature reserve and not a political division.

== List of special administrative regions of China ==
There are currently two special administrative regions established according to Article 31 of the Chinese Constitution. For the Wolong Special Administrative Region in Sichuan Province, please see the section Wolong below.

Special administrative regions of the People's Republic of China
Name	Chinese (T) / (S)	Yale	Pinyin	Postal map	Abbreviation and GB	Population	Area km^{2}	ISO	ISO:CN	Admin. Division
Hong Kong	香港	Hēunggóng	Xiānggǎng	Hongkong	港 (Gǎng), HK, HKSAR	7,184,000	1,104.4	HK	CN-HK	List (18 districts)
Macau	澳門 / 澳门	Oumùhn	Àomén	Macao	澳 (Ào), MO, MC, MSAR, RAEM	614,500	31.3	MO	CN-MO	List (8 freguesias)

== Characteristics ==
The two special administrative regions of Hong Kong and Macau (created in 1997 and 1999 respectively) each have a codified constitution called Basic Law. The law provides the regions with a high degree of autonomy, a separate political system, and a capitalist economy under the principle of "one country, two systems" proposed by Deng Xiaoping.

=== High degree of autonomy ===
Currently, the two SARs of Hong Kong and Macau are responsible for all affairs except those regarding diplomatic relations and national defence. Consequently, the National People's Congress authorises the SAR to exercise a high degree of autonomy and enjoy executive, legislative and independent judicial powers, and each with their own Courts of Final Appeal.

=== Currency ===
- Renminbi: The currency is commonly abbreviated as CNY¥. Adopt a stable exchange rate.
- Hong Kong dollar: The currency is commonly abbreviated as HK$. The exchange rate is pegged to the US dollar.
- Macanese pataca: The currency is commonly abbreviated as MOP$. The exchange rate is pegged to the Hong Kong dollar.

=== External affairs ===
Special administrative regions are empowered to contract a wide range of agreements with other countries and territories such as mutual abolition of visa requirement, mutual legal aid, air services, extradition, handling of double taxation and others, with no Chinese government involvement. However, in some diplomatic talks involving an SAR, the SAR concerned may choose to send officials to be part of the Chinese delegation. For example, when former Director of Health of Hong Kong Margaret Chan became the World Health Organization (WHO) Director-General, she served as a delegate from the People's Republic of China to the WHO.

At the same time they are members of various international organisations such as WTO, APEC, etc.

Hong Kong

- Hong Kong participates in 41 intergovernmental international organisations with countries as participating units.
- Hong Kong participates in 54 intergovernmental international organisations.

Macao

- Macau participates in 19 intergovernmental international organisations with countries as participating units.
- Macau participates in 30 intergovernmental international organisations.

The Government of Hong Kong and Government of Macao have established Hong Kong Economic and Trade Offices (HKETOs) and Delegações Económicas e Comerciais de Macau (DECMs) respectively in some countries, as well as in the Greater China Region. HKETOs serve as a quasi-interests section in favour of Hong Kong. DECMs serve as a quasi-interests section in favour of Macao. For regions with no HKETOs and DECMs, Chinese diplomatic missions take charge of protecting Hong Kong-related and Macau-related interests.

Some countries which have a diplomatic relationship with the central Chinese government maintain Consulate-General offices in Hong Kong and Macau.

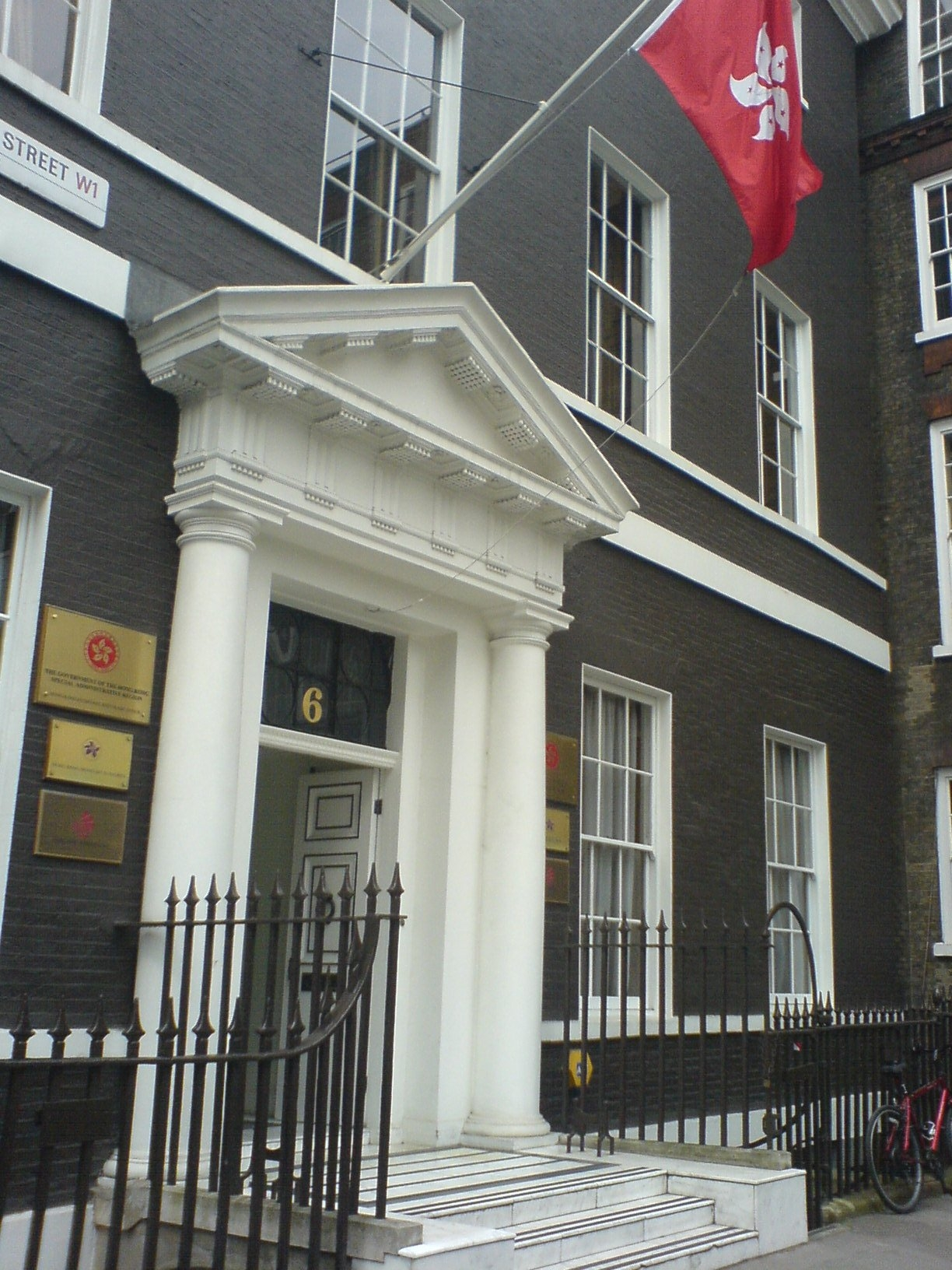
Hong Kong Economic and Trade Office in London

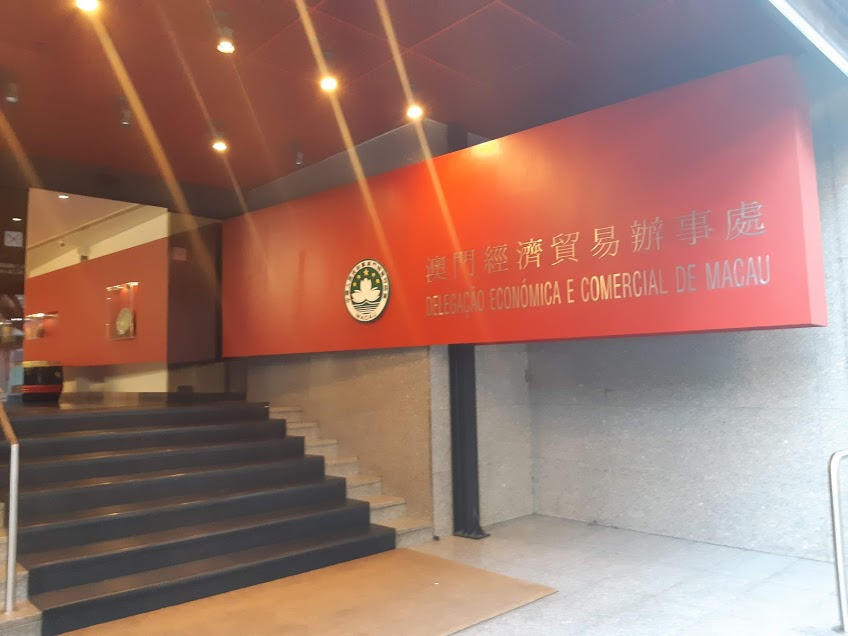
Macao Economic and Commercial Office in Lisbon

=== Olympic Games ===
In sporting events such as the Olympic Games or Asian Games, the SARs may have their own independent teams. They participate under the respective names of "Hong Kong, China" and "Macau, China", and compete as different entities as they had done since they were under foreign rules, but both SARs are usually allowed to omit the term ", China" for informal use.

=== Defence and military ===
The People's Liberation Army is garrisoned in both SARs. PRC authorities have said the PLA will not be allowed to interfere in the local affairs of Hong Kong or Macau, and must abide by their laws. In 1988, scholar Chen Fang of the Academy of Military Science even tried to propose the "One military, two systems" concept to separate the defence function and public functions in the army. The PLA does not participate in the governance of the SAR but the SAR may request it for civil-military participation, in times of emergency such as natural disasters. Defence is the responsibility of the PRC government.

A 1996 draft PRC law banned People's Liberation Army–run businesses in Hong Kong, but loopholes allow it to operate while the profits are ploughed back into the military. There are many PLA-run corporations in Hong Kong. The PLA also has sizeable land holdings in Hong Kong worth billions of dollars.

=== Immigration, nationality, and passports ===
Each of the SARs issues passports on its own to its permanent residents who are concurrently Chinese (PRC) citizens, provided that one of the following conditions is satisfied:

- born in the SAR;
- born anywhere while either parent was a permanent resident of the SAR;
- resided continuously and legally for seven or more years in the SAR and therefore gained a right of abode in the SAR.

The Hong Kong SAR passport is issued to Hong Kong permanent residents with Chinese citizenship, while the Macau Macau SAR passport is issued to Macau permanent residents with Chinese citizenship. Mainland residents with Hukou are ineligible for either and may only hold a Chinese passport, which grants comparatively weaker visa-free access: the Hong Kong SAR passport is granted visa-free access or visa-on-arrival access for 174 countries and territories, the Macau SAR passport is granted such for 141 countries and territories, while the Chinese passport is granted such for 81 countries and territories.

There are no laws prohibiting a person from holding permanent residency in both SARs. A person may also hold concurrently hold passports from both SARs provided that they have Chinese nationality and permanent residency in both.

Apart from affording the holder consular protection by the Ministry of Foreign Affairs, these passports also specify that the holder has right of abode in the issuing SAR.

The National People's Congress has also put each SAR in charge of administering the PRC's Nationality Law in its respective realms, namely naturalisation, renunciation and restoration of PRC nationality and issuance of proof of nationality.

Due to their colonial past, many inhabitants of the SARs hold some form of non-Chinese nationality (e.g. British National (Overseas) status, British citizenship, British Overseas citizenship or Portuguese citizenship). However, SAR residents who are Chinese descent have always been considered as Chinese citizens by the PRC authorities, an exception to this case is Macau, wherein residents of Chinese descent may choose Chinese or Portuguese nationality. Special interpretation of the Nationality Law, while not recognising dual nationality, has allowed Chinese citizens to keep their foreign "right of abode" and use travel documents issued by the foreign country. However, such travel documents cannot be used to travel to mainland China and persons concerned must use Home Return Permit. Therefore, master nationality rule applies so the holder may not enjoy consular protection while in China. Chinese citizens who also have foreign citizenship may declare a change of nationality at the Immigration Department of the respective SARs, and upon approval, would no longer be considered Chinese citizens.

SAR permanent residents who are not Chinese citizens (including stateless persons) are not eligible for SAR passports. Persons who hold a non-Chinese citizenship must obtain passports from foreign diplomatic missions which represents their countries of citizenship. For example, a Russian citizen who has acquired right of abode in Hong Kong and thus holds a Hong Kong Permanent Identity Card would not be considered a Chinese citizen and would continue to hold their Russian passport unless they obtain PRC nationality. For those who are stateless, each SAR may issue its own form of certificates of identity, e.g. Document of Identity, in lieu of national passports to the persons concerned. Chinese citizens who are non-permanent residents of two SARs are also ineligible for SAR passports but may obtain CIs just like stateless persons.

=== Comparisons ===
Body	Hong Kong	Macau	China (national level)
Constitutional Document	Hong Kong Basic Law (national law of China, subordinate to the Chinese constitution)	Macao Basic Law (national law of China, subordinate to the Chinese constitution)	Constitution of China
Final Authority of Constitutional Interpretation & Review	NPC Standing Committee	NPC Standing Committee	NPC Standing Committee
Supreme leader of State	General Secretary of the Chinese Communist Party		General Secretary of the Chinese Communist Party
Representative of State / Territory	Chief Executive of Hong Kong	Chief Executive of Macau	President of China
Head of Government / Territory	Chief Executive of Hong Kong	Chief Executive of Macau	Premier of China
Executive	Executive Council of Hong Kong	Executive Council of Macau	State Council
Legislative	Legislative Council	Legislative Assembly	National People's Congress (NPC); NPC Standing Committee
Judiciary	Hong Kong Court of Final Appeal	Court of Final Appeal of Macau	Supreme People's Court
Legal Supervisory or Prosecution	Department of Justice	Procurator General	Supreme People's Procuratorate
Police	Hong Kong Police Force (part of Hong Kong Disciplined Services)	Public Security Police Force of Macau; Directorate of Judiciary Police (zh) (parts of Macau Security Force)	People's Police (of Public Security, State Security, Justice, Court and Procuratorate systems); People's Armed Police
Military	PLA Hong Kong Garrison	PLA Macau Garrison	People's Liberation Army (PLA); People's Armed Police; Militia
Currency	Hong Kong dollar	Macanese pataca	Renminbi (Chinese yuan)
Official Language(s)	Chinese (traditional), (simplified), (Cantonese), (Mandarin), English	Chinese (traditional), (simplified), (Cantonese), (Mandarin), Portuguese	Standard Chinese (Putonghua) (simplified)
Foreign relations	limited under "Hong Kong, China"	limited under "Macau, China"	full rights
Principal Agency in Foreign Affairs	Office of the Commissioner of the Ministry of Foreign Affairs of China in Hong Kong	Office of the Commissioner of the Ministry of Foreign Affairs of China in Macau	Ministry of Foreign Affairs
Citizenship	Chinese citizenship	Chinese citizenship	Chinese citizenship
Proof of Residency	Right of abode	Right of abode	Hukou
Passport	Hong Kong SAR passport	Macau SAR passport	Chinese passport
Passport Issuing Authorities	Immigration Department	Identification Services Bureau	National Immigration Administration; Ministry of Foreign Affairs; Diplomatic missions
Customs	Customs and Excise Department	Macau Customs Service	General Administration of Customs

== Offer to Taiwan and other ROC-controlled areas ==
The status of a special administrative region for Taiwan and other areas controlled by the Republic of China (ROC) was first proposed in 1981. The 1981 proposal was put forth by NPC chairman Ye Jianying called "Ye's nine points" (葉九條). A series of different offers have since appeared. On 25 June 1983 Deng Xiaoping appeared at Seton Hall University in the US to propose "Deng's six points" (鄧六條), which called for a "Taiwan Special Administrative Region" (台湾特別行政区). It was envisioned that after Taiwan's unification with the PRC as an SAR, the PRC would become the sole representative of China. Under this proposal, Taiwan would be guaranteed its own military, its own administrative and legislative powers, an independent judiciary and the right of adjudication, although it would not be considered a separate government of China.

In 2005 the Anti-Secession Law of the PRC was enacted. It promises the lands currently ruled by the authorities of Taiwan a high degree of autonomy, among other things. The PRC can also employ non-peaceful means and other necessary measures to defend its claims to sovereignty over the ROC's territories in the event of an outright declaration of independence by the former.

In January 2019, the 40-year anniversary of a statement made by the PRC to the Taiwan Area in 1979, Chinese Communist Party general secretary Xi Jinping outlined in a speech how the "one country, two systems" principle would be applied to the region. Several major points from the speech include:

- Taiwan would be a special administrative region of China, and part of the PRC. The ROC would cease to exist.
- Taiwan's institutions would metamorphose into sub-national bodies.
- Taiwan's social system and economic lifestyle would be respected.
- Taiwan's private property rights, belief systems, and legitimate rights and interests would be safeguarded.
- The Taiwan issue should not be passed down from generation to generation (i.e. reunification should be done promptly).
- The reunification of Taiwan would lead to the great rejuvenation of the Chinese nation.

== Wolong ==
The Wolong Special Administrative Region (Chinese: 卧龙特别行政区; pinyin: Wòlóng Tèbié Xíngzhèngqū) is located in the southwest of Wenchuan County, Ngawa Tibetan and Qiang Autonomous Prefecture of Sichuan. It was formerly known as Wolong Special Administrative Region of Wenchuan County, Sichuan Province and was founded in March 1983 with approval of the State Council. It was given its current name and placed under Sichuan provincial government with administrative supervision by the provincial department of forestry. Its area supersedes Sichuan Wolong National Nature Reserve and its administrative office is the same as the Administrative Bureau of the State Forestry Administration for the reserve. It currently has a population of 5,343.

Despite its name, the Wolong Special Administrative Region is not an SAR as defined by Article 31 of the Constitution of China. This is primarily because the Wolong Special Administrative Region was established with the approval of the State Council, rather than "by law enacted by the National People's Congress" as stipulated in Article 31 of the Constitution.

== Defunct SARs ==
In the Republic of China (ROC) era between 1912 and 1949, the "special administrative regions" (Chinese: 特別行政區; pinyin: tèbié xíngzhèngqū) were historically used to designate special areas by the Beiyang government, most of which were eventually converted into provinces by the Nationalist government in 1928. All were suspended or abolished after the end of the Chinese Civil War, with the establishment of the People's Republic of China (PRC) and the ROC government's retreat to Taiwan, but they continued to exist as provinces under ROC law. The regions were:

Name	Chinese	Pinyin	Created	Became province	Current status
Suiyuan	綏遠	Suíyuǎn	1914	1928	Part of Inner Mongolia
Chahar	察哈尔	Cháhā'ěr	1914	1928	Distributed into Inner Mongolia, Beijing and Hebei
Jehol	熱河	Rèhé	1914	1928	Distributed into Hebei, Liaoning and Inner Mongolia
Chwanpien	川边	Chuānbiān	1914	1935 (as Xikang Province)	Western Sichuan and eastern Tibet Autonomous Region
Tungsheng	東省	Dōngshěng	1924		Land along the Chinese Eastern Railway, now part of Heilongjiang
Weihai	威海	Wēihǎi	1930		Part of Shandong
Hainan	海南	Hǎinán	1944	In preparation in 1949	Hainan Province since 1988

== See also ==
- Autonomous regions of China
- Constitution of China
- Federacy
- History of Hong Kong
  - British Hong Kong (1841–1997)
- History of Macau
  - Portuguese Macau (1557–1999)
