= Xu Liangcai =

Chinese military officer (born 1968)

- 徐良才

Commander of the People's Liberation Army in Macao
- In office 1 January 2019 – April 2023
- Preceded by: Liao Zhengrong
- Succeeded by: Yu Changjiang

Personal details
- Born: August 1968 (age 57) Tongshan County, Hubei, China
- Party: Chinese Communist Party

Military service
- Allegiance: China
- Branch/service: People's Liberation Army

Xu Liangcai (Chinese: 徐良才; pinyin: Xú Liángcái; born August 1968) is a Chinese military officer serving as the 7th commander of the People's Liberation Army's Macao Garrison.

== Biography ==
Xu was born in August 1968 in Tongshan County, Hubei. He enlisted in the army in September 1986 and joined the Chinese Communist Party in June 1989.

He served in various posts in the Southern Theater Command, including director of Joint Operation Department.

On January 1, 2019, Xi Jinping, chairman of the Central Military Commission, appointed him as commander of the People's Liberation Army in Macau, replacing Liao Zhengrong (廖正荣).

As of April 2023, he was replaced by major general Yu Changjiang (与长江).

Military offices
Preceded by Liao Zhengrong	Commander of the People's Liberation Army in Macao; 2019 - 2023	Succeeded by Yu Changjiang
