= São Toméan nationality law =

São Toméan Nationality Law

National Assembly of São Tomé and Príncipe
- Long title: Lei n.º 6/90, de 13 de Setembro de 1990, Lei da nacionalidade
- Enacted by: Government of São Tomé and Príncipe
- Status: Current legislation

São Toméan nationality law is regulated by the Constitution of São Tomé and Príncipe, as amended; the Nationality Law, and its revisions; and various international agreements to which the country is a signatory. These laws determine who is, or is eligible to be, a national of São Tomé and Príncipe. The legal means to acquire nationality, formal legal membership in a nation, differ from the domestic relationship of rights and obligations between a national and the nation, known as citizenship. Nationality describes the relationship of an individual to the state under international law, whereas citizenship is the domestic relationship of an individual within the nation. São Toméan nationality is typically obtained under the principles of jus soli, i.e. by birth in the territory, or jus sanguinis, i.e. by birth in São Tomé and Príncipe or abroad to parents with São Toméan nationality. It can be granted to persons with an affiliation to the country, or to a permanent resident who has lived in the country for a given period of time through naturalization.

== Acquiring São Toméan nationality ==
Nationality can be obtained in São Tomé and Príncipe at birth or later in life through naturalization.

=== By birth ===
Typically, in São Tomé and Príncipe, nationality at birth is determined by jus soli. Those who are eligible include:

- Persons born in São Tomé and Príncipe, as long as the parents are residents and do not have diplomatic immunity; (Note: Bronwen Manby, an academic who specializes in nationality studies, notes that in São Tomé and Príncipe the law specifies the parents must be long-term residents, but does not require that they are legal residents. She also notes that there is a discrepancy between the 1990 Nationality Law, requiring residency, and the 2003 Constitution, which automatically grants nationality to those born in the country.)
- Foundlings or orphans, with no discernible evidence as to the nationality or identity of its parents; or
- Persons born in São Tomé and Príncipe who would otherwise be stateless.

=== By naturalization ===
Naturalization can be granted to persons who understand Portuguese or another dialect of the territory and have resided in São Tomé and Príncipe for a sufficient period of time to confirm they understand the customs and traditions of the country. General provisions are that applicants have legal capacity, have not committed crimes against the state or crimes resulting in serious penalty, and have the economic means to support themselves. Applicants must renounce other nationality and verify residency of a minimum of five years. Besides foreigners meeting the criteria, other persons who may apply for naturalization include:

- Persons born abroad to parents who are São Toméan acquire can nationality upon reaching the age of majority, if their birth was registered with consular authorities;
- The spouse of a São Toméan national;
- Children of a naturalized São Toméan, upon request;
- Adoptees of São Toméan nationals automatically acquire nationality upon completion of a legal adoption; or
- Persons who have provided service to the state may be able to naturalize without meeting requirements.

=== By investment or donation ===
The 2022 Nationality Law allows the government to grant São Toméan nationality by naturalization to foreign nationals who make investments that significantly contribute to the country's development or make qualifying donations. For applicants qualifying on these grounds, the ordinary requirements of five years' legal residence and knowledge of Portuguese or a national language may be waived.

In 2025, Decree-Law No. 07/2025 established the "Programa de Cidadania por Investimento ou Doação" as a special naturalization method and created the National Transformation Fund (NTF) to receive qualifying contributions. The minimum contribution (donation) is US$90,000 for a single applicant or US$95,000 for a family application of two to four people, and US$5,000 for each additional qualifying dependents. A separate US$5,000 due-diligence and application processing fee is charged per application and is non-refundable. The contribution to the NTF is payable only after approval in principle.

== Loss of nationality ==
São Toméans are allowed to renounce their nationality, provided that they will not become stateless. The nationality law requires denaturalization for native citizens who perform actions, like voting, as if they were nationals of another country or for serving the government, including the military, of another state. Naturalized persons can be deprived of nationality for the same reasons and additionally for committing crimes against the state or state security or for disloyalty to the state. Persons who have previously lost their São Toméan naturalization may repatriate as long as they reside in the country for at least two years.

== Dual nationality ==
São Tomé and Príncipe has allowed dual nationality for nationals from birth in most cases since 2003. The main restriction on dual nationality is that the president and Prime Minister must hold only São Toméan nationality.

== History ==
=== Portuguese colony (1470–1975) ===
Historical accounts differ as to whether the islands of São Tomé and Príncipe were inhabited or uninhabited when the Portuguese first encountered them. Typically the dates of discovery (though they often vary by a few years) by Portuguese explorers João de Santarém and Pêro Escobar are given as 21 December 1470 for São Tomé and 17 January 1471 for Santo Antão, later renamed as Príncipe. They were named, respectively for the feast days of Saint Thomas and Saint Anthony to honor the dates on which each island was encountered. Shortly after the arrival of the Portuguese, from 1472, Africans from Calabar, as well as the Kingdoms of Benin, Kongo, and Loango began migrating to the islands. Colonization by the Portuguese was not attempted until 1485, when João de Paiva attempted to settle on the island to grow sugarcane. His efforts failed and colonization was not attempted again until 1493, when Álvaro Caminha succeeded in establishing a settlement on São Tomé. Caminha was given civil and judicial authority in the island and the authority to appoint officials. In 1500, António Carneiro was assigned the Captaincy of Príncipe, which was held by his family until 1753, when the territory was returned to the crown. In 1502, Santo Antão was renamed as the Ilha do Príncipe in honor of Afonso, Prince of Portugal. São Tomé was returned to the crown in 1522.

In the earliest period of settlement mixed marriages were encouraged to foster security on the islands, but by the sixteenth century, the crown attempted to prohibit such unions. Society in São Tomé and Príncipe was highly stratified with white Europeans at the top, followed in descending rights to Creoloes, Forros (slaves, later freedmen, who had arrived with the first colonists), free blacks, and slaves. Manumissions had begun on São Tomé as early as 1499 and in 1515, a Royal Decree granted collective freedom to African wives and the mixed-race children of white settlers. In 1517, the Forros were collectively manumitted. In 1520, the royal charter for the island, gave political rights to the Forros, if they owned property and were married. Under the Ordinances of Manuel I (Portuguese: Ordenações Manuelinas), compiled by Portugal in 1521, courts were given leeway to interpret common law and local custom in the territories without established High Courts. Nationals were defined as those born in Portuguese territory and leaving the territory without permission of the sovereign was grounds for denaturalization. In São Tomé, a 1540 Royal Decree granted equal status to whites and freed blacks. In 1603, the Ordinances of Philip I (Portuguese: Ordenações Filipinas) established that Portuguese nationals were children born on the Iberian Peninsula or adjacent islands, Brazil, or to an official in service to the crown in the Portuguese possessions of Africa or Asia, whose father was a native of Portugal, or whose mother was a native of Portugal and whose father was a foreigner who had established domicile in Portugal for a minimum of ten years. Those who were not in service to the crown in the colonies (except Brazil) were not considered to be Portuguese. A child could not derive nationality directly from its mother unless it was illegitimate.

The first Constitution of Portugal, drafted in 1822, defined subjects of the Portuguese crown as the children of a male, native to any of the territories of the kingdom. The nationality scheme laid out in 1603 remained mostly unchanged except for some clarifications, such as legitimate children of a Portuguese father or illegitimate children of a Portuguese mother born abroad could be nationals if they resided in Portugal and children born to a Portuguese mother and foreign father could only derive Portuguese nationality upon reaching their majority and requesting it. Two new provisions included that foundlings discovered on Portuguese soil were considered nationals, as were freedmen. Naturalization was only available to foreign men who married Portuguese women, and only if they had investments in the country or provided service to the crown. Denaturalization resulted from service to, or receiving benefits from, a foreign government, or obtaining other nationality. A new constitution was adopted in 1826 (which was in force from 1826 to 1828, 1834 to 1836, and 1842 to 1910) which granted nationality to anyone born on Portuguese soil. Birth by descent was accepted as establishing nationality, as long as the father lived in Portugal or was abroad in service to the monarch. Provisions stipulated that only illegitimate children could derive nationality from their mother and established that a nationality law was to define provisions for naturalization.

The new nationality code was promulgated as the Decree of 22 October 1836, which established that grounds for naturalization included having reached majority, demonstrating adequate means of self-support, and having a minimum of two years residency, which could be waived if one had Portuguese ancestry. The Civil Code of 1867 reiterated similar nationality requirements to those that had previously been in effect, with the exception that a foreign woman, upon marriage to a Portuguese husband, automatically acquired Portuguese nationality. It also provided that Portuguese women who married foreigners lost their nationality, unless they would become stateless, and could not reacquire Portuguese status unless the marriage terminated and she lived in Portugal. It retained the provisions of the 1836 Decree for naturalization but increased residency to three years and added stipulations that applicants must have completed their military duties to their country of origin and that they have no criminal record. The Indigenous Code (Portuguese: código indígenato) of 1899, which established a non-citizen national status for indigenous people, applied to all Portuguese colonies except Cape Verde and São Tomé and Príncipe. The nationality requirements remained stable and did not significantly change again until 1959, when a new Nationality Law (Lei n.º 2098), granted Portuguese nationality to anyone born in São Tomé and Príncipe, unless the parents were foreign diplomats. Married women continued to derive their nationality from their husband, with the exception that a woman could retain her nationality of origin if she specifically declared she did not want to be Portuguese and could prove that her country of origin allowed retention of her nationality after marriage.

After the collapse of the Estado Novo dictatorship in Portugal in 1974 and following a lengthy struggle for independence of the colonies, Portugal agreed to begin the process of decolonization. By the Decree of 25 April 1974, the Portuguese Parliament created the African countries of Angola, Cape Verde, Guinea Bissau, Mozambique, and São Tomé e Príncipe. In November 1974, Portugal agreed to terms for independence and a transitional government was organized. In an attempt to settle the nationality question of those in the new countries, Portugal promulgated Decree-Law 308/75 on 24 June 1975. Under its terms, the legislation assumed that São Toméans and others born in the colonies would become nationals of the new countries if they did not declare a preference to retain their Portuguese nationality. It proclaimed that those who would not lose Portuguese nationality at independence included only persons born in Portugal but living abroad and persons born abroad in the territory but who had established long-term ties with Portuguese culture by living in Portugal. No option was offered to other Portuguese nationals to retain their status and the automatic loss of nationality left many former colonial nationals stateless.

=== Post-independence (1975–present) ===
São Tomé and Príncipe gained independence on 12 July 1975 and adopted its first law on nationality (Lei da nacionalidade) on 1 December. Transitional nationality was granted based on the Portuguese model, meaning São Toméans at independence were those who were born in São Tomé and Príncipe to parents who were also born there, children born in the territory to foreigners who were still living in São Tomé and Príncipe at majority and chose to become nationals, foundlings born in São Tomé and Príncipe, and to wives of São Toméans. Dual nationality was permitted with the caveat that the other nationality would not be recognized in São Tomé and Príncipe. In 1990, the Nationality Law (Lei 6/90) was revised to grant gender equality, meaning wives and mothers could transmit their nationality the same as men, and to provide adoptees with the nationality of their parents. The new law also provided that persons who naturalized had to renounce any other nationality and São Toméans who acquired nationality abroad would be automatically denaturalized, unless the acquisition of other nationality was because of emigration. A new constitution was adopted in 2003, which stated that São Toméans of origin could not be denaturalized. The adoption of the constitution created a legal conflict between the constitution and nationality law which prohibits dual nationality.
