= Yu Changjiang =

Chinese general

- 与长江

Commander of the People's Liberation Army Macao Garrison
- Incumbent
- Assumed office April 2023
- Preceded by: Xu Liangcai

Military service
- Allegiance: People's Republic of China
- Branch/service: People's Liberation Army Ground Force
- Rank: Major general

Yu Changjiang (Chinese: 与长江; pinyin: Yǔ Chángjiāng) is a Chinese military officer serving as the 8th commander of the People's Liberation Army's Macao Garrison.

== Biography ==
He previously served as the commander of the Sansha Garrison District in the province of Hainan. In April 2023 his appointment to the commander of the People's Liberation Army's Macao Garrison was announced by the then General Wang Xiubin, commander of the Southern Theater Command. He said that he would implement the principle of one country, two systems, perform defense duties in accordance with the law and to strengthen the armed forces within Macau. He replaced his predecessor major general Xu Liangcai(徐良才).

In April 2023 he was promoted to the rank of major general.

Military offices
Preceded by Xu Liangcai	Commander of the People's Liberation Army in Macao; 2023 - present	Incumbent
