= Macao Garrison =

People's Liberation Army Macao Garrison
- 中國人民解放軍駐澳門部隊; Guarnição em Macau do Exército de Libertação do Povo Chinês
- Emblem of the Macao Garrison
- Founded: 20 December 1999; 26 years ago
- Country: China ∟ Macau
- Allegiance: Chinese Communist Party
- Branch: PLA Ground Force
- Size: 1,000
- Part of: Southern Theater Command
- Garrison/HQ: Macau

Commanders
- Commander: Major General Chen Wensheng
- Political commissar: Major General Lian Wei

Chinese People's Liberation Army Macao Garrison

Chinese name
- Traditional Chinese: 中國人民解放軍駐澳門部隊
- Simplified Chinese: 中国人民解放军驻澳门部队
- Literal meaning: China People Liberation Army stationing Àomén Troops
Transcriptions
Standard Mandarin
- Hanyu Pinyin: Zhōngguó Rénmín Jiěfàngjūn Zhù Àomén Bùduì
Yue: Cantonese
- Jyutping: zung1 gwok3 jan4 man4 gaai2 fong3 gwan1 zyu3 ou^{3} mun^{4*2} bou6 deoi6*2

Portuguese name
- Portuguese: Guarnição em Macau do Exército de Libertação do Povo Chinês

The People's Liberation Army Macao Garrison (Note: The English name of the garrison follows the English name of the city instead of the Portuguese name, therefore it should be "Macao".) is a garrison of the People's Liberation Army (PLA), responsible for defense duties in the Macau Special Administrative Region (SAR) since the handover of Macau in December 1999.

The PLA stations between 500 and 600 troops in Macau, primarily as a symbolic presence to underscore Chinese sovereignty. The remainder of the 1,200-strong Macau garrison resides just across the Chinese border in Zhuhai.

Although the Macao Basic Law states that the Macau SAR government may "when necessary" ask the central government to allow the garrison to assist in maintaining public order or disaster relief, Chief Executive Edmund Ho has said that, in keeping with the Basic Law the garrison will play no role in internal security. The garrison has maintained a low profile, with soldiers generally wearing civilian clothing when off base and not engaging in business activities.

== Mission ==
According to the Law on Stationing Troops in the Macau Special Administrative Region (or Macao Garrison Law, passed by the NPC Standing Committee on June 28, 1999), the mission of the PLA in Macau is to defend the special administrative region by "preventing and resisting aggression; safe-guarding the security of Macau; undertaking defense services; managing military facilities; and handling related foreign military affairs." The PLA can also be called upon by the chief executive to help maintain public order and assist with disaster relief efforts. The members of the garrison are mainly ground force troops.

=== 2017 Typhoon Hato ===
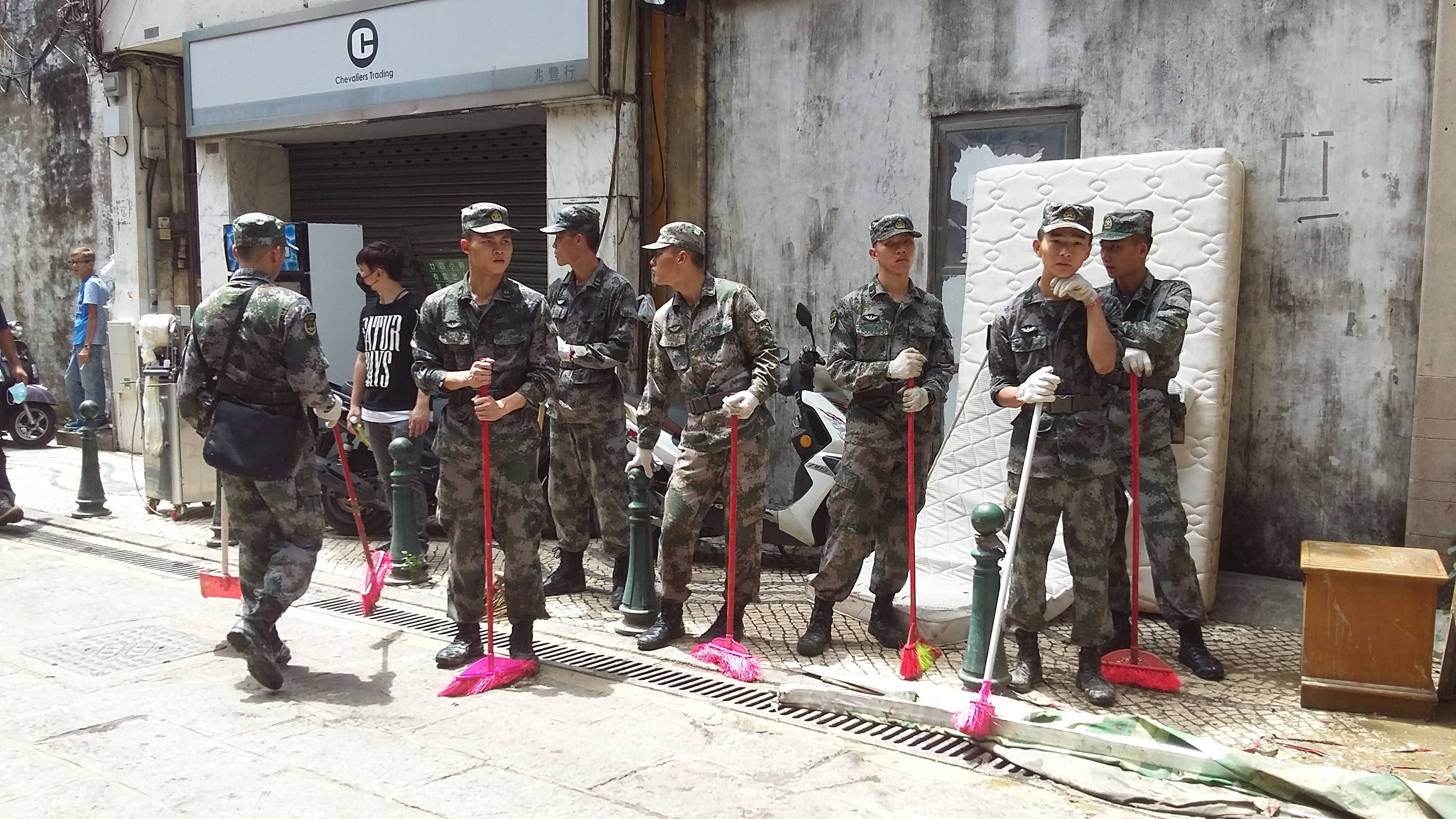
PLA Macau Garrison troops cleaning Macau streets after Typhoon Hato.

At the request of Macau SAR Government, the PLA Macao Garrison was deployed to assist in disaster relief and cleaning up in the aftermath of Typhoon Hato in August 2017, the first time for domestic affairs in Macau history. About 1,000 troops were called in to help remove debris and clear roads.

== Organization ==
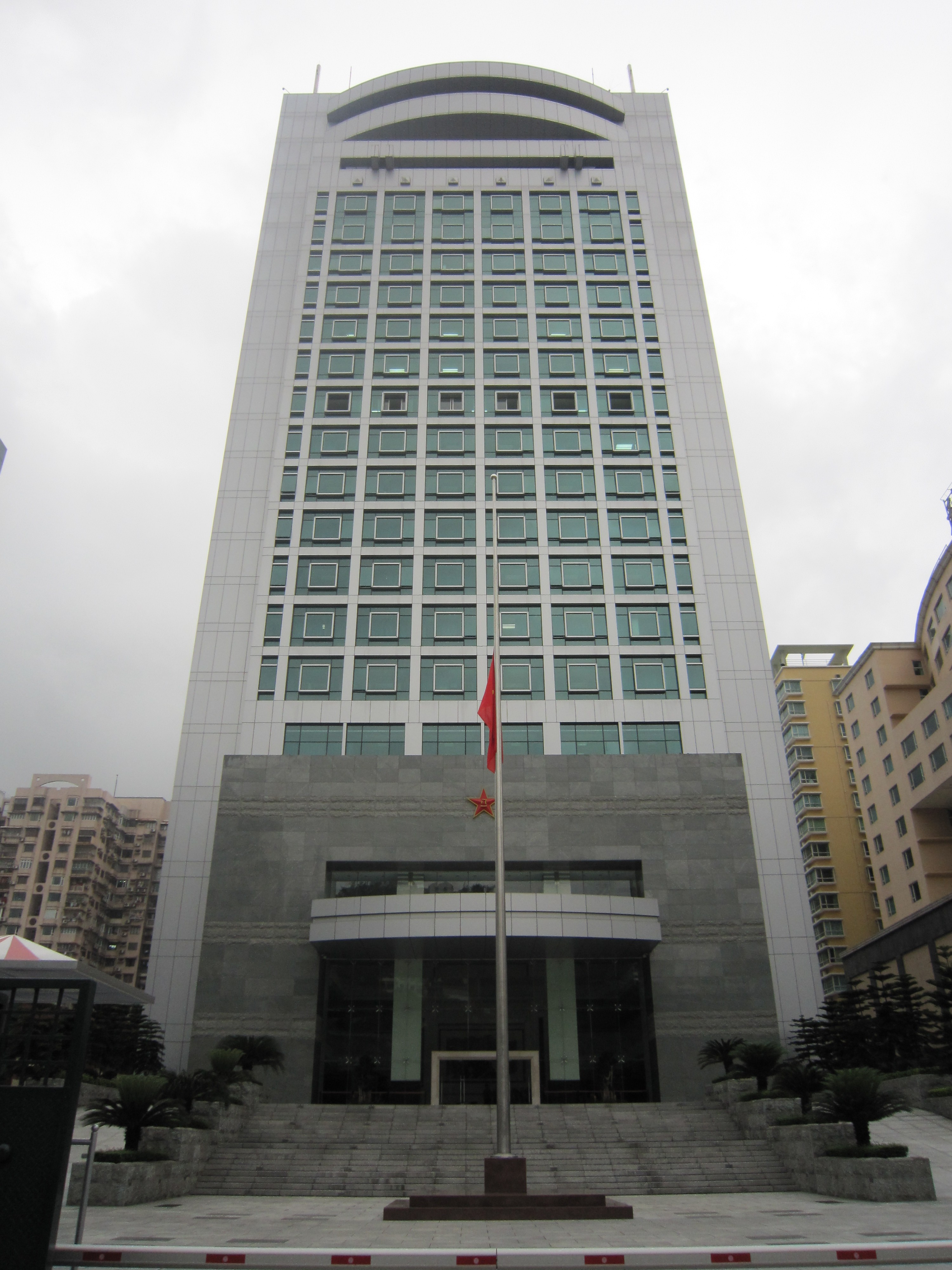
People's Liberation Army Macao Garrison headquarters

The PLA Macao Garrison is under the command and control of the Central Military Commission and under the operational supervision of the Southern Theater Command, and its budget is administered by the central government in Beijing. A PLA major general heads the Macao Garrison.

Garrison Commanders

- Maj. General Liu Yuejun 1999–2002
- Maj. General Liu Lianhua 2002–2008
- Maj. General Wang Yuren 2008–2010
- Maj. General Zhu Qingsheng 2010–2014
- Maj. General Wang Wen 2014–2018
- Maj. General Liao Zhengrong 2018
- Maj. General Xu Liangcai 2019–2023
- Maj. General Yu Changjiang 2023–2026
- Maj. General Chen Wensheng 2026–present

Political Commissars

- Maj. General He Xianshu 1999–2001
- Maj. General Liu Liangkai 2001–2003
- Maj. General Yang Zhongmin 2003–2006
- Maj. General Li Wenchao 2006–2007
- Maj. General Zhao Cunsheng 2007–2008
- Maj. General Xu Jinlin 2008–2013
- Maj. General Ma Biqiang 2013–2014
- Maj. General Zhang Zhimeng 2014–2017
- Maj. General Zhou Wugang 2017–2019
- Maj. General Sun Wenju 2019–2023
- Maj. General Lin Qinghua 2023–2026
- Maj. General Lian Wei 2026–present

== Troops ==
- 1 motorized infantry
- 1 armoured company

== Equipment ==
| Model | Type | Number | Dates | Builder | Details |
|---|---|---|---|---|---|
| ZFB91 | 6 wheeled Armored Personnel Carrier (Internal Security/Anti-Riot Vehicle) | 10 | 1980s | Norinco China | with 12.7mm machine gun |
| BJ2020S | Utility vehicle | N/A | N/A | Beijing-Jeep China | variant of Soviet UAZ469B |
| EQ2102 | Troop/Cargo Carrier Truck | N/A | N/A | Dongfeng Motor Corporation China | |
| EQ2081/2100 | Utility Truck | N/A | N/A | Dongfeng Motor Corporation China | (formerly EQ240 and likely Chinese variants of the Zil 131) and other support vehicles |
| Type 88 Sniper Rifle | designated marksman rifle | N/A | N/A | Norinco China | |
| QBZ-95 | assault rifle | N/A | N/A | China | |
| QBZ-191 | assault rifle | n/a | n/a | China | |

== Bases ==
The garrison was temporarily stationed at the 11 storey Edificação Long Cheng/Long Cheng Mansion. It is now stationed on Taipa located amongst the new casinos in Cotai (Estrada da Baía de Nossa Sra. da Esperança across from Hotel Venetian and Galaxy Macau).

There are more troops at the barracks in Zhuhai (Zhengling).

== See also ==
- Military of Macau under Portuguese rule
- Hong Kong Garrison
- British Forces Overseas Hong Kong
