= Right of abode in Macau =

Legal right to permanent residency in Macau

In Macau immigration law, the right of abode (Chinese: 居留權, Portuguese: Direito de Residência) entitles a person to live and work without any restrictions or conditions of stay. Individuals with this right are called permanent residents. Foreign nationals may acquire the right of abode after meeting a seven-year residency requirement and are given most rights usually associated with citizenship, including the right to vote in regional elections. However, they are not entitled to hold territorial passports unless they also naturalise as Chinese citizens.

As a special administrative region of China, the territory does not have its own nationality law and natural-born residents are generally Chinese citizens. Prior to 1999, the region was a colony of Portugal and right of abode was tied to Portuguese nationality law. Although Macau, mainland China, and Hong Kong constitute a single country, local residents with Chinese citizenship do not have automatic residence rights in either of the other two jurisdictions, which both control immigration separately. Conversely, mainland Chinese and Hong Kong residents do not automatically have residence or employment rights in Macau.

== Acquisition and loss ==
Becoming a Macau permanent resident has slightly different requirements depending on an individual's nationality. Acquisition by birth operates on a modified jus soli basis; individuals born in Macau to Chinese nationals or to Portuguese citizens domiciled there are automatically permanent residents, while those born to other foreign nationals must have at least one parent who possesses right of abode. Children born outside Macau generally only acquire right of abode if they are Chinese nationals at birth. Individuals of mixed Chinese and Portuguese descent born abroad to at least one permanent resident domiciled in Macau also acquire right of abode if they have Chinese nationality or have not yet chosen one; persons with Chinese-Portuguese ancestry are given a choice to declare which nationality they choose to identify with. Chinese nationality is usually conferred by descent to children born abroad, unless the parents have obtained permanent residency in another country or foreign citizenship.

Nonresidents seeking to become permanent residents must be ordinarily resident in Macau for a continuous period of at least seven years before becoming eligible for the status. Ordinarily resident in this context excludes certain classes of people, including central government officials and incarcerated individuals. Chinese nationals may qualify using any seven-year residence period, while foreigners are only eligible on the basis of the seven years immediately preceding their applications. Individuals from mainland China seeking to settle in Macau are additionally subject to emigration control by the central government.

Permanent residents who are not Chinese nationals automatically lose the right of abode if they are absent from Macau for more than three years. These individuals retain unrestricted access to live, study and work in the territory, but are no longer non-deportable. Foreign permanent residents can naturalise as Chinese nationals and become exempt from automatic loss, but are required to renounce their previous nationality on successful application. However, individuals of mixed Chinese-Portuguese heritage are not required to do so when selecting a nationality.

== Rights and privileges ==
Permanent residents have the unrestricted right to live and work in Macau and cannot be deported from the territory, regardless of their nationality. They are required to register for Macau Resident Identity Cards, eligible for welfare benefits, and able to vote in regional elections. Chinese nationals with territorial right of abode are eligible to hold Macao Special Administrative Region passports, stand for office in the Legislative Assembly, and can serve as principal officials of the government. Those who additionally do not possess right of abode in foreign countries are eligible for election as Chief Executive.

Macau permanent residents do not have automatic residence or employment rights in mainland China. The central government issues Home Return Permits to residents who are Chinese citizens for travel purposes and Residence Permits if they intend to reside or work in the mainland for longer than six months. Macau permanent residents are also subject to immigration controls in Hong Kong, and must obtain permits if living there for more than six months and also working, and studying.

== See also ==
- Hukou
- Right of abode in Hong Kong

== Sources ==
=== Sources ===
==== Legislation ====
- Basic Law Chapter IV Section 2
- Lei sobre Residente Permanente e Direito de Residência na Região Administrativa Especial de Macau [Law on Permanent Residence and Right of Abode in the Macao Special Administrative Region] (PDF) (Law 8) (in Portuguese). 1999.
- Regulamento sobre os Requerimentos Relativos à Nacionalidade dos Residentes da Região Administrativa Especial de Macau [Regulations on Nationality Requirements for Residents of the Macao Special Administrative Region] (PDF) (Law 7) (in Portuguese). 1999.

==== News articles ====
- Su, Xinqi (16 August 2018). "New ID card will give Hong Kong, Macau and Taiwan residents same access to public services as mainland Chinese counterparts". South China Morning Post. Archived from the original on 15 March 2019.
