= Jus soli =

Birthright of anyone born in the territory of a state to nationality or citizenship

Countries by birthright citizenship: Unconditional birthright citizenship for persons born in the country Birthright citizenship with restrictions Birthright citizenship abolished No birthright citizenship

Jus soli (English: /dʒʌs ˈsoʊlaɪ/ juss SOH-ly or /juːs ˈsoʊli/ yooss SOH-lee, Latin: [juːs ˈsɔliː]), meaning 'right of the soil', is the right of anyone born in the territory of a state to nationality or citizenship. Jus soli was part of the English common law, in contrast to jus sanguinis ('right of blood') associated with the French Civil Code of 1804.

Jus soli is the predominant rule in the Americas; explanations for this geographical phenomenon include the establishment of lenient laws by past European colonial powers to entice immigrants from the Old World and displace native populations in the New World, along with the emergence of successful wars of independence movements that widened the definition and granting of citizenship, as a prerequisite to the abolishment of slavery since the 19th century.

There are 35 countries that provide citizenship unconditionally to anyone born within their national borders. Some countries outside the Americas with mixed systems extend jus soli citizenship on a limited basis to children who are not otherwise eligible for any national citizenship, such as children born to women who are unwed or from countries that do not recognize maternal jus sanguinis citizenship. Others impose a residency requirement requiring parents to live in the country for a certain number of years before children born in the country become eligible for conditional jus soli citizenship. These mixed systems were implemented to fulfill treaty obligations after the atrocities of World War II increased awareness about the vulnerability of stateless persons. When the sovereignty over a territory is transferred from one state to another, individuals may be given the right of option of nationality based on jus soli or other rules.

== Background ==
Jus soli, sometimes called lex soli, is the principle of citizenship acquired by the place of birth. French jurist Charles Demolombe invented the term around 1860. Children born to a parent in the diplomatic or consular service of another state are often not eligible for jus soli citizenship in a host State.

Unconditional jus soli is mostly found in the Americas. Some countries outside the Americas with mixed systems extend jus soli citizenship on a limited basis to children who are not otherwise eligible for any national citizenship, such as children born to women who are unwed or from countries that do not recognize maternal jus sanguinis citizenship. Others impose a residency requirement requiring parents to live in the country for a certain number of years before children born in the country become eligible for conditional jus soli citizenship. UNHCR gives ten reasons for why people become stateless including laws related to marriage, administrative practices, renunciation of citizenship and nationality laws that discriminate on the basis of gender.

There is a trend in some countries toward restricting jus soli by requiring that at least one of the child's parents be a citizen, national or legal permanent resident of the state in question at time of the child's birth.

=== Reduction of statelessness ===
A map of parties to the Convention on the Reduction of Statelessness. Parties to Convention in dark green; countries which have signed, but not ratified in light green; non-members in grey.

Countries that have acceded to the 1961 Convention on the Reduction of Statelessness are obligated to grant nationality to people born in their territory who would otherwise become stateless persons. (Note: Parties to the Convention on the Reduction of Statelessness are also obligated to grant nationality to people who are born aboard ships flagged in the country or an aircraft registered in the country who would otherwise become stateless.) These mixed systems were implemented to fulfill treaty obligations after the atrocities of World War II increased awareness about the vulnerability of stateless persons.

The American Convention on Human Rights similarly provides that "Every person has the right to the nationality of the state in whose territory he was born if he does not have the right to any other nationality."

=== Birthright citizenship ===
The New Oxford American Dictionary defines birthright citizenship as "a legal right to citizenship for all children born in a country's territory, regardless of parentage". In the United States jus sanguinis is not a constitutional right or a birth right. Citizenship by jus sanguinis is a legal status conferred by statute. The term birthright citizenship usually means jus soli citizenship.

Birthright citizenship is rooted in colonial history when settlers born in the colonial United States were considered "natural born" subjects of the King of England. The idea of conferring citizenship based on being born within the borders of the United States comes from this history. Allegiance based on natural law principles was the core concept of citizenship in Calvin's Case in which Edward Coke said that "they that are born under the obedience, power, faith, ligealty or ligeance of the King are natural subjects and no aliens". The American concept of citizenship is derived from republican principles and may have been influenced by the French writer Emer de Vattel.

=== Abolition ===
Countries have been restricting the right of jus soli in order to discourage birth tourism, anchor babies and illegal immigration, for example with the British Nationality Act 1981. India has abolished jus soli largely in reaction to illegal immigration from Bangladesh. A person who was born in India from 26 January 1950 until 1 July 1987 is a citizen by birth, regardless of the parents' nationality. It was restricted in 1987 to people with at least one parent who was a citizen. As of 2008, a person born in India is a citizen only if at least one parent is a citizen, and the other parent is a citizen or a legal migrant. New Zealand abolished unrestricted birthright citizenship in 2005. Around 9% of all births in the United States in 2023 were to mothers who were illegal immigrants or who had legal temporary status in the U.S.

== By country ==
=== Africa ===
- Chad (the choice to take Chadian citizenship, or that of the parents is made at 18 years of age)
- Egypt: According to the nationality law of the Arab Republic of Egypt and its latest amendments, children born to an Egyptian father or an Egyptian mother acquire citizenship at birth, regardless of their place of birth. Additionally, children born in Egypt to unknown parents (or found abandoned at a young age) are granted citizenship at birth.
- Lesotho
- Morocco: A person who was born in Morocco to parents also born in Morocco and whose immigration is legal, can register as a Moroccan two years prior to becoming an adult.
- Namibia: A person born in Namibia to a Namibian citizen parent or a foreign parent who is ordinarily resident in Namibia, is a Namibian citizen at birth (see Namibian nationality law).
- São Tomé and Príncipe: A person born in São Tomé and Príncipe acquires São Toméan nationality, as long as the parents are residents of the country. The only exception is if any of the parents have diplomatic immunity (see São Toméan nationality law).
- South Africa: Since 6 October 1995, a person born in South Africa to South African citizens or permanent residents is automatically granted South African citizenship (see South African nationality law).
- Sudan: A person born before 1994 gains Sudanese nationality at birth if his father was also born in Sudan. If his father was not born in Sudan, they can apply to the Minister to be granted Sudanese nationality.
- Tanzania: The Tanzania Citizenship Act of 1995, states that "any child born within the borders of the United Republic of Tanzania, on or after Union Day, 26 April 1964, is granted citizenship of Tanzania, except for children of a father who has diplomatic immunity, or parents who were enemy aliens and the territory was under enemy occupation." While Tanzania technically observes birthright citizenship, it is official practice that birth in Tanzania has to be further supported by descent from a Tanzanian parent to be recognized as a citizen by birth. This practice has gone uncontested in courts of law.
- Tunisia: Individuals born in Tunisia are citizens by birth if their father and grandfather were born in Tunisia. Additionally, the person must declare before becoming an adult (20 years) that they want to be a citizen.

=== Asia ===
- Azerbaijan: Article 52 of the constitution of Azerbaijan states that a person born on the territory of the Republic of Azerbaijan is a citizen of the Republic of Azerbaijan; although in practice that provision is not enforced, and persons are only granted citizenship by right based on the other provision within the article, which states that a person of whom one parent is a citizen of the Republic of Azerbaijan is a citizen of the Republic of Azerbaijan.
- Bahrain: Children born to a foreign father with valid residency permits who himself was born in Bahrain have right to citizenship.
- Cambodia: In 1996, Cambodia changed the law to grant citizenship to children born in Cambodia to foreign parents if both parents were born in Cambodia and are living legally in Cambodia (under Article 4(2)(a) of the 1996 Nationality Law).
- China: China has strict nationality laws that limit jus soli citizenship to children born to stateless parents who have settled in China.
- Hong Kong: Since the July 1997 transfer of sovereignty over Hong Kong, most political rights and eligibility for most benefits are conferred to permanent residents regardless of citizenship. Conversely, PRC citizens who are not permanent residents (such as residents of Mainland China and Macao) are not conferred these rights and privileges. The Basic Law provides that all citizens of the People's Republic of China (PRC) born in the territory are permanent residents of the territory and have the right of abode in Hong Kong. The 2001 case Director of Immigration v. Chong Fung Yuen clarified that the parents need not have right of abode and as a consequence many women from Mainland China began coming to Hong Kong to give birth. By 2008, the number of babies in the territory born to Mainland China mothers had grown to twenty-five times the number five years prior. Non-PRC citizens born to non-PRC citizen Hong Kong permanent resident parents in Hong Kong also receive permanent residence of Hong Kong at birth. Other persons must have "ordinarily resided" in Hong Kong for seven continuous years in order to gain permanent residence (Articles 24(2) and 24(5)).
- India: India abolished jus soli in 2004.
- Indonesia: Indonesian citizenship by birth includes those born anywhere whose parents are both Indonesian nationals, or any person born in Indonesia with at least one Indonesian citizen parent, or a child born in Indonesia to unknown parents, or those born out of wedlock. Citizenship can also be granted to a permanent resident who has lived in Indonesia for a given period of time through naturalization, as long as the parents are stateless, or unknown.
- Iran: Article 976(4) of the Civil Code of Iran grants citizenship at birth to persons born in Iran of foreign parents if one or both of the parents were themselves born in Iran. Article 976(5) People born in Iran of a father of foreign nationality who have resided at least one more year in Iran immediately after reaching the full age of 18; in other cases their naturalization as Iranian subjects will be subject to the stipulations for Iranian naturalization laid down by the law. New legislation passed by the Iranian Parliament in 2012 grants permanent residency to children born to Iranian mothers and foreign fathers. See Iranian nationality law.
- Israel: Children born in Israel who have never acquired another citizenship are eligible to apply for Israeli citizenship between their 18th and 21st birthday if they have lived in Israel for over five years (see Israeli citizenship law).
- Japan: Children born in Japan to stateless or unknown parents are Japanese nationals at birth.
- Macau: Similar to Hong Kong, most political rights and eligibility for most benefits are conferred to permanent residents regardless of citizenship since the December 1999 transfer of sovereignty over Macau, according to the Basic Law of Macau. Becoming a Macau permanent resident has slightly different requirements depending on an individual's nationality. Acquisition by birth operates on a modified jus soli basis; individuals born in Macau to Chinese nationals or to Portuguese citizens domiciled there are automatically permanent residents, while those born to other foreign nationals must have at least one parent who possesses right of abode (see Right of abode in Macau).
- Malaysia: A person born in Malaysia on or after 16 September 1963 with at least one parent being a Malaysian citizen or is automatically a Malaysian citizen (see Malaysian nationality law).
- Mongolia: A person born in Mongolia to foreign parents with valid residency permits can apply for Mongolian nationality when they turn the age of 16. A child in Mongolian territory with unidentified parents can receive Mongolian citizenship (see Mongolian nationality law).
- Pakistan: Under the Pakistan Citizenship Act of 1951 passed by the Constituent Assembly of Pakistan on 13 April 1951, everyone born in Pakistan on or after that date automatically receives Pakistani citizenship by birth except if they are the child of a foreign diplomat or enemy alien. On 11 November 2024, the National Assembly's Standing Committee on Interior advanced a bill to restrict citizenship for children born to foreigners. The bill did not pass the full legislature: When the National Assembly took up a group of bills in May 2025, the proposed amendment to Section 4 of the Citizenship Act was not put to a vote. The bill would have amended the Pakistan Citizenship Act of 1951 and would change the citizenship law by requiring every person born in Pakistan on or after 13 April 1951 to have at least one parent that is a citizen or a permanent resident of Pakistan in order to be granted Pakistani citizenship by birth or live in Pakistan for a period of 10 years from the date of their birth.
- Taiwan: Any child born to parents with Taiwanese citizenship, even those living abroad, can acquire Taiwanese nationality at birth. Children born in Taiwan to stateless parents or have unknown parentage are considered Taiwanese nationals at birth (see Taiwanese nationality law).
- Thailand: Thailand operated a system of pure jus soli prior to 1972. Due to illegal immigration from Burma, the Nationality Act was amended by requiring both parents to legally reside and be domiciled in Thailand for at least five years for their child to be granted Thai citizenship at birth. Furthermore, someone who has Thai citizenship by sole virtue of jus soli may be stripped of Thai citizenship under various conditions (such as living abroad), which does not apply to people who have Thai citizenship by virtue of jus sanguinis.

=== Europe ===
- France: Children born in France (including overseas territories) to at least one parent who is either (i) a French national or (ii) born in France, are automatically granted French nationality at birth. Children born in France to foreign parents who do not fulfil either of these two conditions may acquire citizenship from age 13 subject to residence conditions (see French nationality law). A child born in France to foreign parents becomes a French citizen automatically upon turning 18, provided that they reside in France on their 18th birthday and have had their primary residence in France for a total (but not necessarily continuous) period of at least 5 years since the age of 11. Children born in France to two stateless parents receive French nationality automatically at birth.
- Germany: Prior to 2000, Germany's nationality law was based entirely on jus sanguinis, but now children born in Germany on or after 1 January 2000 to non-German parents acquire German citizenship at birth if at least one parent has a permanent residence permit and resided in Germany for at least five years prior to the child's birth.
- Greece: Apart from regulations in past and historic nationality laws of Greece granting nationality jus soli, the Greek Nationality Code of 2004 states that "A person born in Greek territory acquires by birth the Greek nationality if not acquiring alien nationality or is of unknown nationality". Additionally, as from 2015's amendment of 2004 Code (Law 4332 of 2015, G.G. A/76/9 July 2015), a child born in Greece by foreign parents shall acquire the right of Greek nationality with a combination of primary school attendance and parents' legal residence in Greece (5 years, 10 if the child is born prior to 5 years of legal residence). One year after the implementation of the law (as from July 2016), 6,029 children had been granted Greek nationality, out of 27,720 submitted applications.
- Ireland: Irish nationality law conveyed birthright citizenship to anyone born anywhere on the island of Ireland (including in Northern Ireland, which is part of the United Kingdom) until the 27th Amendment was passed by referendum in 2004. The amendment was preceded by media reports of heavily pregnant women claiming political asylum, who expected that, even if their application was rejected, they would be allowed to remain in the country if their new baby was a citizen. In 2005, Irish nationality law was amended to require that at least one of the parents be an Irish citizen; a British citizen; a resident with a permanent right to reside in the Republic of Ireland or in Northern Ireland; or a legal resident residing three of the last four years in the country (excluding students and asylum seekers). The amendment was prompted by the case of Man Chen, a Chinese woman living in Great Britain who traveled to Belfast (Northern Ireland, part of the UK) to give birth in order to benefit from the previous rule whereby anyone born on any part of the island of Ireland was automatically granted Irish citizenship. The Chinese parents used their daughter's Irish citizenship (and thereby European Union citizenship) to obtain permanent residence in the UK as parents of a dependent EU citizen. Ireland was the last country in Europe to abolish unrestricted jus soli.
- Italy: The law that regulates this right is n. 91 of 5 February 1992. Article 4 paragraph 2 grants this possibility to a person born in Italy, who has legally resided there without interruption until reaching the age of 18, and becomes a citizen if they declare that they wish to acquire Italian citizenship within one year from the aforementioned date. They can make use of this right by submitting a simple declaration of will to the Civil Status Office of their municipality of residence. It is important to know that the Municipality of belonging is required, according to article 33 of Law 98/2013, to inform foreign citizens, during the 6 months preceding the age of 18, of the possibility of applying for Italian citizenship by the age of 19. In the absence of such communication, the request can be made even after the age of 19. In the event that, despite having been born in Italy, one has not had continuous residence from birth, but has resided in Italy for at least three years, at the age of 18, the application can be presented at the Prefecture with all the necessary documentation. Furthermore, in application of art. 1 of the same law and which aims to prevent statelessness, in Italy the jus soli is applied in other cases: – by birth in Italy of unknown or stateless parents; – by birth on Italian territory of foreign parents unable to transmit their citizenship to the subject according to the law of the country of origin; – the child of unknown persons found in the territory of the Republic is considered a citizen by birth, if the possession of another citizenship is not proven.
- Latvia: A person born since 1 January 2020 in Latvia or to Latvian-resident parents defaults to Latvian citizenship, although the child can instead gain a different citizenship at birth if both parents agree on this; if either parent is a citizen of another country, the parents must submit documentation disclaiming any other birthright citizenship the child would otherwise be entitled to in order for the child to be recognized as a Latvian citizen by jus soli.
- Luxembourg: A person born in Luxembourg is automatically a Luxembourg citizen if at least one of their parents was also born in Luxembourg. Additionally, a person born in Luxembourg to foreign, non-Luxembourg-born parents can become a Luxembourg citizen from the age of 12 if they have resided uninterrupted in Luxembourg for at least 5 years immediately prior to submitting the application, and if at least one of their parents lived in Luxembourg uninterrupted for at least 12 months immediately preceding their birth. Furthermore, a person born in Luxembourg to foreign, non-Luxembourg-born parents gains Luxembourg citizenship automatically upon reaching the age of 18, provided that they have lived uninterrupted in Luxembourg for the preceding 5 years and at least one of their parents lived uninterrupted in Luxembourg for at least 12 months immediately preceding their birth.
- Malta: A person born in Malta on or after 1 August 1989 is automatically a Maltese citizen if at least one of their parents is Maltese or was born in Malta. Anyone born in Malta before 1 August 1989, regardless of their parents' circumstances, is automatically a Maltese citizen, as the country conferred unconditional jus soli until this date (see Maltese nationality law).
- Netherlands: After 31 December 1984, the following conditions apply: "The child's mother has Dutch nationality at the time of birth, or the child's parents both have Dutch nationality at the time of birth, or the father of the child has Dutch nationality at the time of birth and is married/registered partner to the non-Dutch mother or acknowledged the child, or the child and the child's mother have their principal residence in the Kingdom of the Netherlands at the time of birth. One of the mother's parents also had her main residence in the Kingdom on the day the mother was born, or the child and the child's father have their principal residence in the Kingdom of the Netherlands at the time of birth. One of the father's parents also had his main residence in The Kingdom on the day the father was born."
- Portugal: A child born in Portuguese territory to parents who do not possess another nationality is a Portuguese citizen. Also, a person born to foreign parents who were not serving their respective states at the time of birth is a Portuguese citizen if the person declares that they want to be Portuguese and provided that one of the parents has resided in Portugal for at least one year at the time of birth.
- Spain: A child born in Spain to foreign parents may acquire Spanish citizenship jus soli under certain conditions, for example, if either one of the parents was also born in Spain or if neither of the parents can transmit their nationality to the child (such as stateless parents).
- Ukraine: A child born on the territory of Ukraine may acquire Ukrainian citizenship jus soli, if they do not acquire foreign nationality by jus sanguinis from parents, or if their parents have been granted refugee or asylum status in Ukraine, or if the child is stateless or of unknown nationality (see Ukrainian citizenship law, articles 6 and 7).
- United Kingdom: Unrestricted jus soli citizenship was abolished by the British Nationality Act of 1981. Between 1 January 1983 and 1 July 2006, children born out of wedlock to foreign (non-British) women and British men were not eligible for citizenship unless the mother was legally "settled" in the country. Beginning in 2006, British fathers could automatically pass on their nationality to children born out of wedlock. In 2022, the Nationality and Borders Act 2022 updated the British Nationality Act 1981 to include discretionary routes to register children born out of wedlock to British fathers. Under the current law, if neither parent is British or settled, then a child born in the UK can apply for British citizenship if they have spent the first ten years of their life in the UK (see British nationality law).

=== North America ===
- Antigua and Barbuda: Guaranteed by the Constitution.
- Barbados: Guaranteed by the Constitution.
- Belize
- Canada: Subsection 3(2) of the Citizenship Act states that Canadian citizenship by birth in Canada – including Canadian airspace and territorial waters – is granted to a child born in Canada even if neither parent was a Canadian citizen or permanent resident except if either parent was a diplomat, in service to a diplomat, or employed by an international agency of equal status to a diplomat. However, if neither parent was a diplomat, the nationality or immigration status of the parents does not matter. Some Conservative Party members wish to end birthright citizenship in Canada for the children of tourists and illegal immigrants.
- Costa Rica: Jus soli requires registration with the Costa Rican government before the age of 25.
- Cuba
- Dominica
- Dominican Republic: The constitution was amended on 26 January 2010. The amendment broadened the definition of the 2004 migration law – which excluded from citizenship children born to individuals that were "in transit" – to include "non-residents" (including individuals with expired residency visas and undocumented workers).
- El Salvador
- Grenada
- Guatemala
- Honduras
- Jamaica
- Mexico: Article 30 of the Constitution of Mexico states that persons born in Mexican territory are natural-born citizens of Mexico regardless of their parents' nationality. The definition of "territory" includes vessels/aircraft flagged to Mexico travelling in international waters or airspace.
- Nicaragua
- Panama
- Saint Kitts and Nevis
- Saint Lucia
- Saint Vincent and the Grenadines
- Trinidad and Tobago
- United States: Birthright citizenship in the United States is guaranteed by the Citizenship Clause of the 14th Amendment to the United States Constitution, ratified in 1868. The government may deny citizenship to U.S.-born children only in the cases of children born to foreign diplomats and children born to enemy forces engaged in hostile occupation of the country's territory. People born in American Samoa do not acquire U.S. citizenship at birth, unless one of their parents is a U.S. citizen.

On 20 January 2025, President Donald Trump signed an executive order aiming to end the practice of birthright citizenship. The order required at least one parent to be a U.S. citizen or lawful permanent resident for persons born in the U.S to become U.S. citizens at birth. On 30 June 2026, in the case of Trump v. Barbara, the Supreme Court rejected the order and reaffirmed that all persons born in the United States are citizens.

=== Oceania ===
- Australia: Since 20 August 1986, a person born in Australia acquires Australian citizenship by birth only if at least one parent was an Australian citizen or permanent resident; or else after living the first ten years of their life in Australia, regardless of their parents' citizenship status (see Australian nationality law).
- New Zealand: Since 1 January 2006, a person born in New Zealand acquires New Zealand citizenship by birth only if at least one parent was a New Zealand citizen or permanent resident (includes Australian citizens and Permanent Residents) (see New Zealand nationality law), or if to prevent being stateless.
- Fiji
- Tuvalu

=== South America ===
- Argentina (Except for children of persons in the service of a foreign government, such as foreign diplomats.)
- Bolivia
- Brazil (requires that the foreign parents are not working for their country's government in Brazil at the time the child is born).
- Chile's Constitution grants nationality to "those born in Chilean territory, with the exception of the children of foreigners who are in Chile in service of their government, and the children of transient foreigners, all of which, however, may opt for the Chilean nationality."
- Colombia: Article 96 of the constitution grants Colombian nationality by birth provided that at least one of the parents is a Colombian national or a legal resident. By presidential decree, in August 2019 nationality was granted to children of Venezuelan migrants born in Colombia regardless of residential status of their parents.
- Ecuador
- Guyana
- Paraguay
- Peru (registration required at 18 years of age)
- Uruguay
- Venezuela

== See also ==
- Birthright citizenship in the United States
- History of citizenship
- Nationality law
- Blood and soil
- Natural-born-citizen clause
