= Court of Final Appeal =

Court of Final Appeal may refer to:

- Supreme court, in most legal jurisdictions, the highest court within the hierarchy of courts
- Hong Kong Court of Final Appeal, the court with the final adjudication power on the laws of Hong Kong
  - Court of Final Appeal Building, the court building
- Court of Final Appeal of Macau, the court with the final adjudication power on the laws of Macau
