= Tabitha Chaŵinga =

Malawian footballer (born 1996)

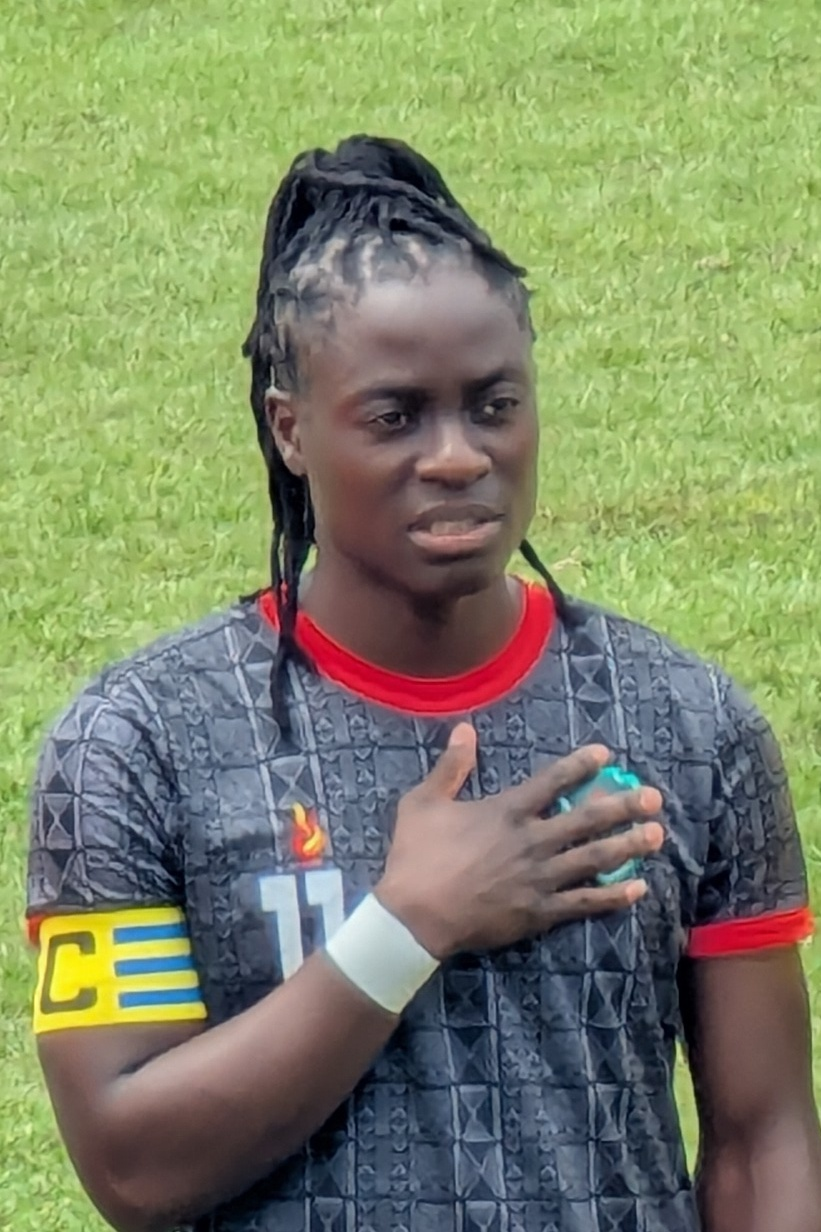

Personal information
- Date of birth: 22 May 1996 (age 30)
- Place of birth: Rumphi, Malawi
- Height: 1.72 m (5 ft 8 in)
- Position: Forward

Team information
- Current team: Lyon
- Number: 11

Senior career*
Years	Team	Apps	(Gls)
2009–2014	DD Sunshine	24	(83)
2014	Krokom/Dvärsätts IF	17	(39)
2015–2017	Kvarnsvedens IK	70	(84)
2018–2020	Jiangsu Suning	78	(62)
2021–2024	Wuhan Jianghan University	8	(11)
2022–2023	→ Inter Milan (loan)	23	(23)
2023–2024	→ Paris Saint-Germain (loan)	21	(19)
2024–	Lyon	38	(19)

International career^{‡}
2011–	Malawi	20	(30)
Medal record
Women's football
Representing Malawi
Women's Africa Cup of Nations
Silver medal – second place	2026 Morocco
- * Club domestic league appearances and goals as of 21:34, 6 November 2026 (UTC) ‡ National team caps and goals as of 12 August 2026

Tabitha Chaŵinga (born 22 May 1996) is a Malawian professional footballer who plays as a forward for Première Ligue club Lyon and the Malawi national team.

== Early life ==
Born on 22 May 1996 in Rumphi District in northern Malawi, Chaŵinga is the third of five children born to her parents. She is of Tumbuka ethnicity. She began playing football at age five and played with boys until age 13 when she began playing for girls' club, DD Sunshine in the capital city, Lilongwe. Already at this age she was forced to undress because "Her opponents did not believe she was female because of her physical appearance and how well she played." Her sister, Temwa, is also a professional footballer.

== Club career ==
=== Krokom/Dvärsätts IF ===
At age 18, Chaŵinga played for Swedish third-division club Krokom/Dvärsätts IF, where she earned the league's golden boot after scoring 39 goals in 18 games. She was the first women's footballer from Malawi to play for a European club.

=== DD Sunshine ===
Her club DD Sunshine was in trouble after its founder and Chawinga's mentor David Dube became ill after a stroke in 2014. Tabitha stepped forward becoming a sponsor eventually supporting two women's teams and a young man's team. She began contributing financially when the stroke happened becoming the club's sponsor in 2020.

=== Kvarnsvedens IK ===
Chaŵinga joined Kvarnsvedens IK in Sweden's Elitettan in 2015. In her debut for the club, she scored a brace in a 4–0 win over Lidköpings FK. The club finished in first place during the regular season with a 21–2–3 record. Chaŵinga was the league's top scorer with 43 goals – 14 more than the next highest scorer. The club's first-place finish secured them promotion to the Damallsvenskan for the 2016 season.

During the 2016 season, Chaŵinga was the third highest scorer in the league with 15 goals.

In 2017, she finished as the league's top scorer with 26 goals, despite her club's relegation from the Swedish top flight at the end of the season.

=== Jiangsu Suning ===
After successful spells in Sweden, Chaŵinga gained the interest from various top clubs abroad and eventually signed for Chinese side Jiangsu Suning, reportedly for a record-breaking transfer fee in Swedish women's football. On 6 May 2018, she scored the winning goal in her full-length debut away to Shanghai.

Chaŵinga received the Player of the Year Award in her debut season playing in the Chinese Women's Super League. She scored 31 goals in all competitions, 17 being in the CWSL. She retained the award in 2019–20, scoring 12 league goals (38 in all competitions) and helping Jiangsu to a historic quadruple.

=== Wuhan Jiangda ===
After the main sponsor of Jiangsu Suning stopped supporting Chaŵinga, she moved to Wuhan Jiangda where her sister Temwa played. Wuhan sent her on successive loan spells to Inter Milan and Paris Saint Germain. After her loan spell with Paris Saint Germain, without returning to China, Chaŵinga signed for reigning French champions Lyon.

=== Inter Milan (loan) ===
Chaŵinga signed a one-year loan deal with Inter Milan for the 2022–23 season. She was the top scorer in Serie A with 23 goals for Inter Milan, 16 of them in the regular season. She was the first African woman to be the highest-scoring player in Serie A.

=== Paris Saint-Germain (loan) ===
Chaŵinga joined Paris Saint-Germain on a season long loan deal. Chaŵinga reunited with manager Gérard Prêcheur, under whom she had worked during the 2018–19 CWSL season with Jiangsu Suning. However, he left the position in September 2023.

Chaŵinga scored her first goal for PSG in a 1–0 victory away at Saint-Etienne. She also became the first Malawian to play and score in the UEFA Women's Champion's League with her goal in a 1–1 tie with Manchester United.

In the 74th minute against BK Häcken in the first leg of the 2023–24 Champions League quarterfinal, Chaŵinga scored the winning goal making it 2–1.

== International career ==
Chaŵinga serves as captain for Malawi.

Due to club football, Chaŵinga was absent from Malawi's 2023 victory in the COSAFA Women's Championship.

In February 2025 she returned from France to join other Malawian players picked to play Zambia. She was one of seven players based abroad who were included in Lovemore Fazili's Malawi squad. Sabinah Thom and Chimwemwe Madise also made the team and they were contracted to play in the Democratic Republic of Congo while Rose Kabzere also returned from France. Bernadette Mkandawire was with Vanessa Chikupira in Zambia and Temwa Chawinga joined them from America.

== Personal life ==
Chaŵinga's sister Temwa is also a Malawian international footballer who now plays for Kansas City Current of the NWSL in USA.

== Career statistics ==
=== Club ===
Appearances and goals by club, season, and competition
Club	Season	League			National cup (Note: Includes Svenska Cupen, Chinese FA Women's Cup, Coppa Italia, Coupe de France Féminine)		League cup (Note: Includes Coupe LFFP)		Continental		Total	
Club	Season	Division	Apps	Goals	Apps	Goals	Apps	Goals	Apps	Goals	Apps	Goals
DD Sunshine	2009–10		0	0	0	0	0	0	0	0	0	0
DD Sunshine	2010–11		0	0	0	0	0	0	0	0	0	0
DD Sunshine	2011–12		14	40	0	0	0	0	0	0	14	40
DD Sunshine	2012–13		10	43	0	0	0	0	0	0	10	43
DD Sunshine	2013–14		0	0	0	0	0	0	0	0	0	0
DD Sunshine	Total		24	83	0	0	0	0	0	0	24	83
Krokom/Dvärsätts IF	2014	Division 1	18	39	0	0	0	0	0	0	18	39
Kvarnsvedens IK	2015	Elitettan	26	43	0	0	0	0	0	0	26	43
Kvarnsvedens IK	2016	Damallsvenskan	22	15	0	0	0	0	0	0	22	15
Kvarnsvedens IK	2017	Damallsvenskan	22	25	1	1	0	0	0	0	23	26
Kvarnsvedens IK	Total		70	83	1	1	0	0	0	0	71	86
Jiangsu Suning	2018	Chinese Super League	14	17	0	0	1	0	0	0	15	17
Jiangsu Suning	2019	Chinese Super League	14	12	2+	6	1	0	3 (Note: Appearances in AFC Women's Champions League)	3	20+	21
Jiangsu Suning	2020	Chinese Super League	12	7	0	0	0	0	0	0	12	7
Jiangsu Suning	Total		40	36	2+	6	2	0	0	0	44+	42
Wuhan Jianghan University	2021	Chinese Super League	14	9	0	0	0	0	0	0	14	9
Wuhan Jianghan University	2022	Chinese Super League	10	8	0	0	0	0	0	0	10	8
Wuhan Jianghan University	2023	Chinese Super League	3	3	0	0	0	0	0	0	3	3
Wuhan Jianghan University	Total		27	20	0	0	0	0	0	0	27	20
Inter Milan (loan)	2022–23	Serie A	23	23	4	3	0	0	0	0	27	26
Paris Saint-Germain (loan)	2023–24	Division 1	21	19	5	4	0	0	12 (Note: Appearances in UEFA Women's Champions League)	6	38	29
Lyon	2024–25	Première Ligue	19	7	1	0	0	0	9	2	29	9
Lyon	2025–26	Première Ligue	18	13	1	2	1	0	8	3	28	18
Lyon	Total		37	20	1	2	1	0	17	5	57	27
Career total			260	323	13	16	3	0	30	13	306	352

=== International ===
Scores and results list Malawi's goal tally first, score column indicates score after each Chaŵinga goal.

List of international goals scored by Tabitha Chaŵinga
No.	Date	Venue	Opponent	Score	Result	Competition
1	13 September 2017	Barbourfields Stadium, Bulawayo, Zimbabwe	Zambia	1–0	3–6	2017 COSAFA Women's Championship
2	13 September 2017	Barbourfields Stadium, Bulawayo, Zimbabwe	Zambia	2–3	3–6	2017 COSAFA Women's Championship
3	13 September 2017	Barbourfields Stadium, Bulawayo, Zimbabwe	Zambia	3–5	3–6	2017 COSAFA Women's Championship
4	15 September 2017	Barbourfields Stadium, Bulawayo, Zimbabwe	Madagascar	1–0	6–3	2017 COSAFA Women's Championship
5	15 September 2017	Barbourfields Stadium, Bulawayo, Zimbabwe	Madagascar	2–0	6–3	2017 COSAFA Women's Championship
6	15 September 2017	Barbourfields Stadium, Bulawayo, Zimbabwe	Madagascar	5–3	6–3	2017 COSAFA Women's Championship
7	15 September 2017	Barbourfields Stadium, Bulawayo, Zimbabwe	Madagascar	6–3	6–3	2017 COSAFA Women's Championship
8	17 September 2017	Luveve Stadium, Bulawayo, Zimbabwe	Zimbabwe	2–3	3–3	2017 COSAFA Women's Championship
9	17 September 2017	Luveve Stadium, Bulawayo, Zimbabwe	Zimbabwe	3–3	3–3	2017 COSAFA Women's Championship
10	4 April 2019	Kamuzu Stadium, Blantyre, Malawi	Mozambique	1–0	11–1	2020 CAF Women's Olympic Qualifying Tournament
11	4 April 2019	Kamuzu Stadium, Blantyre, Malawi	Mozambique	3–0	11–1	2020 CAF Women's Olympic Qualifying Tournament
12	4 April 2019	Kamuzu Stadium, Blantyre, Malawi	Mozambique	11–0	11–1	2020 CAF Women's Olympic Qualifying Tournament
13	9 April 2019	Estádio do Zimpeto, Maputo, Mozambique	Mozambique	2–0	3–0	2020 CAF Women's Olympic Qualifying Tournament
14	28 August 2019	Kamuzu Stadium, Blantyre, Malawi	Kenya	2–1	3–2	2020 CAF Women's Olympic Qualifying Tournament
15	28 August 2019	Kamuzu Stadium, Blantyre, Malawi	Kenya	3–1	3–2	2020 CAF Women's Olympic Qualifying Tournament
16	7 November 2020	Wolfson Stadium, Ibhayi, South Africa	Lesotho	2–0	9–0	2020 COSAFA Women's Championship
17	7 November 2020	Wolfson Stadium, Ibhayi, South Africa	Lesotho	4–0	9–0	2020 COSAFA Women's Championship
18	7 November 2020	Wolfson Stadium, Ibhayi, South Africa	Lesotho	5–0	9–0	2020 COSAFA Women's Championship
19	7 November 2020	Wolfson Stadium, Ibhayi, South Africa	Lesotho	6–0	9–0	2020 COSAFA Women's Championship
20	7 November 2020	Wolfson Stadium, Ibhayi, South Africa	Lesotho	8–0	9–0	2020 COSAFA Women's Championship
21	7 November 2020	Wolfson Stadium, Ibhayi, South Africa	Lesotho	9–0	9–0	2020 COSAFA Women's Championship
22	12 November 2020	Wolfson Stadium, Ibhayi, South Africa	South Africa	2–6	2–6	2020 COSAFA Women's Championship
23	5 September 2022	NMU Stadium, Gqeberha, South Africa	Comoros	3–0	6–0	2022 COSAFA Women's Championship
24	5 September 2022	NMU Stadium, Gqeberha, South Africa	Comoros	4–0	6–0	2022 COSAFA Women's Championship
25	5 September 2022	NMU Stadium, Gqeberha, South Africa	Comoros	5–0	6–0	2022 COSAFA Women's Championship
26	19 June 2025	Kenitra Municipal Stadium, Kenitra, Morocco	Morocco	1–0	2–4	Friendly
27	28 July 2026	Al Medina Stadium, Rabat, Morocco	Nigeria	2–0	3–2	2026 Women's Africa Cup of Nations
28	5 August 2026	Al Medina Stadium, Rabat, Morocco	Zambia	1–2	1–2	2026 Women's Africa Cup of Nations
29	12 August 2026	Rabat Olympic Stadium, Rabat, Morocco	Algeria	1–0	3–1	2026 Women's Africa Cup of Nations
30	12 August 2026	Rabat Olympic Stadium, Rabat, Morocco	Algeria	3–1	3–1	2026 Women's Africa Cup of Nations

== Honours ==
Kvarnsvedens IK

- Elitettan: 2015

Jiangsu Suning

- Chinese Women's Super League: 2019
- Chinese National Women's Football Championship: 2019
- Chinese Women's FA Cup: 2019
- Chinese Women's Super Cup : 2019
- AFC Women's Club Championship runner-up: 2019

Wuhan Jianghan University

- Chinese Women's Super League: 2021

Paris Saint-Germain

- Coupe de France: 2023–24

Lyon

- Division 1 Féminine: 2024–25

Individual

- Elitettan top scorer: 2015
- Damallsvenskan top scorer: 2017
- Sweden Forward of the Year: 2017
- IFFHS CAF Women's Team of the Decade 2011–2020
- IFFHS All-time Africa Women's Dream Team: 2021
- Chinese Women's Super League top scorer: 2018, 2019, 2021
- Chinese Women's Super League Player of the Year: 2018, 2019
- Serie A Best Forward: 2022–23
- Serie A Team of the Season: 2022–23
- AIC Serie A Women's Team of the Year: 2022–23
- AIC Serie A Female Footballer of the Year: 2022–23
- UNFP Première Ligue player of the year: 2023–24
- LFFP Première Ligue best player: 2023–24
- UEFA Women's Champions League Team of the Season: 2023–24
- UNFP Première Ligue team of the year: 2023–24, 2024–25
- LFFP Première Ligue team of the season: 2023–24
- Division 1 Féminine Player of the Month: February 2024, March 2024
- CAF Team of the Year Women's XI: 2023, 2024
