= Bia Zaneratto =

Brazilian footballer (born 1993)

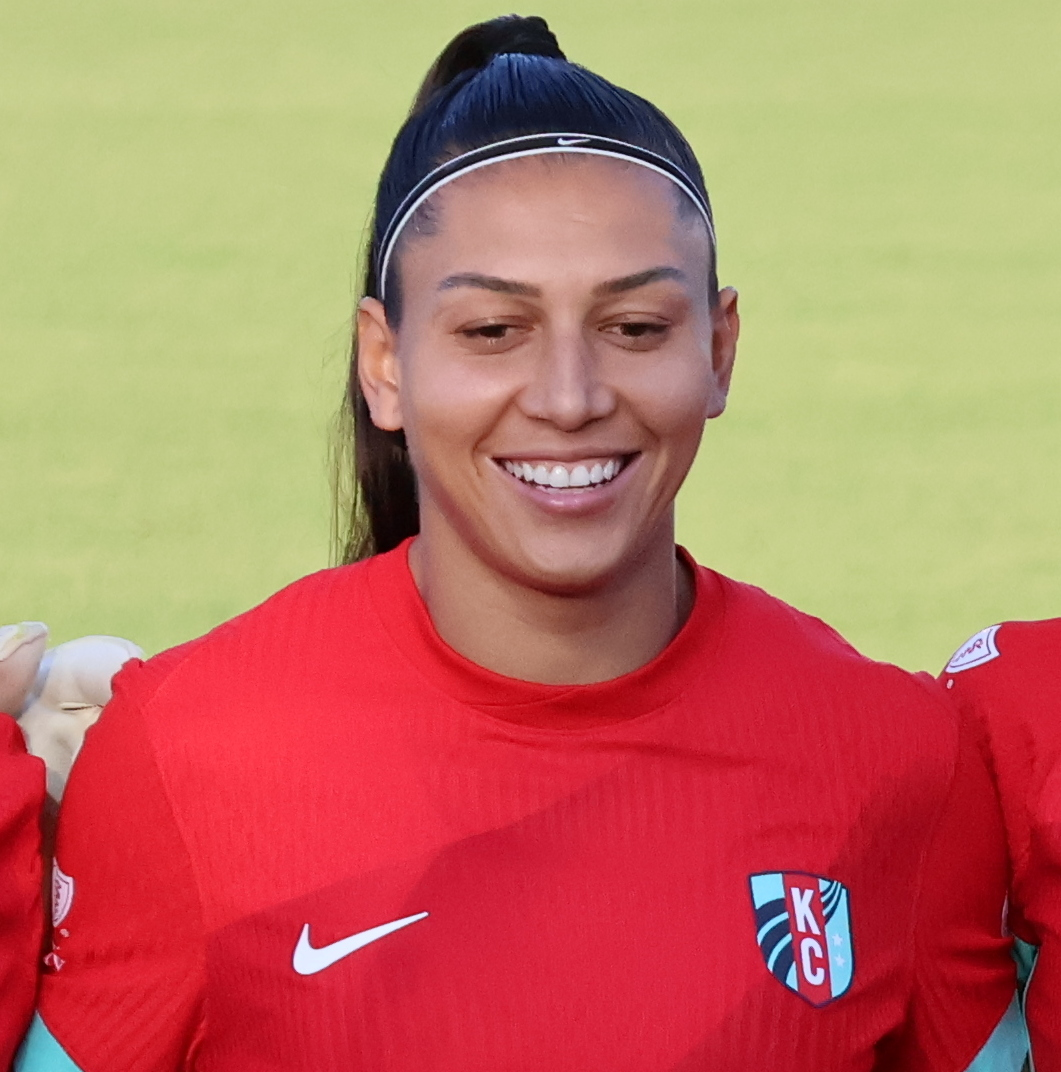
- Beatriz with Kansas City Current in April 2025

Personal information
- Full name: Beatriz Zaneratto João
- Date of birth: 17 December 1993 (age 32)
- Place of birth: Araraquara, São Paulo, Brazil
- Height: 1.76 m (5 ft 9 in)
- Position: Forward

Team information
- Current team: Palmeiras
- Number: 10

Youth career
- Espaço Criança

Senior career*
| Years | Team | Apps | (Gls) |
| 2007–2009 | Ferroviária | | |
| 2010 | Santos | | |
| 2011 | Bangu | | |
| 2012 | Vitória das Tabocas | | |
| 2013–2019 | Hyundai Steel Red Angels | 103 | (78) |
| 2020–2021 | Wuhan Jianghan University | 9 | (7) |
| 2020 | → Palmeiras (loan) | 2 | (2) |
| 2021 | → Palmeiras (loan) | 15 | (13) |
| 2022–2024 | Palmeiras | 22 | (15) |
| 2024–2025 | Kansas City Current | 40 | (12) |
| 2026– | Palmeiras | 0 | (0) |

International career^{‡}
| 2010 | Brazil U17 | 4 | (0) |
| 2012 | Brazil U20 | 3 | (0) |
| 2011– | Brazil | 111 | (38) |
- * Club domestic league appearances and goals as of 15:01, 7 January 2026 (UTC) ‡ National team caps and goals as of 24 July 2023 (UTC)

Beatriz Zaneratto João (born 17 December 1993), known as Bia Zaneratto, Bia or sometimes Beatriz, is a Brazilian professional footballer who plays as a forward for Palmeiras of Brazil and the Brazil women's national team. She was part of the national squad at the 2011, 2015, 2019, and 2023 FIFA Women's World Cups.

== Club career ==
=== Hyundai Steel Red Angels ===
Bia joined her local team Ferroviária at the age of 13. In 2010, she moved to play for reigning Copa Libertadores Femenina champions Santos. In February 2013, Bia Zaneratto and her Vitória das Tabocas teammate Thaísinha announced that they had accepted a transfer to South Korean club Incheon Hyundai Steel Red Angels. With the team, Beatriz has won seven consecutive WK League championships between 2013 and 2019. In the 2015 championship, she scored an equalizing goal in the 123rd minute to force the game to penalty shoot-out, where her team prevailed.

=== Wuhan Jianghan University ===
From 2020 to 2021, she played for Chinese team Wuhan Jianghan University, where she scored seven goals in nine matches to help them win the 2020 Chinese Women's Super League.

==== Loans to Palmeiras ====
After the suspension of competitions due to the COVID-19 pandemic, Zaneratto was loaned to Palmeiras. After a long time away from Brazilian football, Bia made her Palmeiras debut in the Brazilian Women's Championship, scoring one of the five goals in the team's victory over Cruzeiro in Belo Horizonte.

Still in 2020, Bia took part in and won the charity Esports tournament *Copa GamHer*, in which female players competed in matches of the football video game FIFA 20. It was Zaneratto's first experience and title in an esports event. Representing the Brazilian women's eNational Team, Bia defeated Spanish player Sheila Garcia—then playing for Rayo Vallecano—by a score of 5–1 in the final. The purpose of the tournament was to raise funds to fight the COVID-19 pandemic.

"Very happy to represent the eSeleção! Great challenge against Sheila García. Congratulations on your journey so far, it's clear how much you give your all and bring emotion to the game. It was a pleasure playing with you. A different and special day with a win, this time in the game, 5–1." – Bia Zaneratto on Twitter

At the end of her loan, Palmeiras managed to extend Bia's stay for another 30 days. After that extension ended, Zaneratto returned to China in July to play for Wuhan Xinjiyuan, which went on to win its second consecutive league title.

In 2021, Bia was again loaned to Palmeiras. After competing in the Tokyo 2020 Olympic Games, which she participated in, her contract with Palmeiras ended and she returned to China. Despite a major fan campaign to keep her, including the use of the hashtag #FicaZaneratto ("StayZaneratto"), she left the club. During this six-month period in the 2021 Brasileirão A1, she scored 13 goals and provided 8 assists for Palmeiras. While at Palmeiras in 2021, she became the first player in the history of the Brazilian Women's Championship to be named Player of the Month, which she won for her performances in May.

Zaneratto won the "ESPN Bola de Prata Sportingbet 2021" and the "Prêmio Brasileirão 2021" awards in the categories of top scorer, best forward, best player of the Brasileirão, and Bola de Ouro, sweeping all the possible honors. In the first edition of the "Troféu Nosso Palestra" awards by the Palmeiras fan news portal *Nosso Palestra*, held on 30 December 2021, Zaneratto was named "Best Player," beating fellow nominees Bruna Calderan and Julia Bianchi. Zaneratto finished 2021 among the top eleven South American players of the year, according to the IFFHS.

=== Palmeiras ===
After her contract with Wuhan Xinjiyuan ended in December 2021, Bia became a free agent and was pursued by both Flamengo and Palmeiras. In the end, she decided to sign a one-season contract with Palmeiras. This signing was described by the club's management as a "Christmas gift" to the fans. A large part of Zaneratto’s return to Palmeiras was driven by an online campaign from supporters, who used the hashtag #VoltaZaneratto to request her return and build momentum on social media. On 27 December, the club officially announced Zaneratto’s return with a special video shared on its social media platforms.

“I am very motivated and happy to return. I appreciate all the love from the fans on social media. My goal is to return to Palmeiras and win titles with my teammates,” declared Bia Zaneratto.

In 2021, she was honored by Palmeiras supporter and musician Marlon Góes with the song *Hit da Bia Zaneratto*, which celebrates her style of play and describes her as the "Palmeiras star". In 2022, Zaneratto was part of the Palmeiras squad that won both the São Paulo Women's State Championship and the Copa Libertadores Femenina.

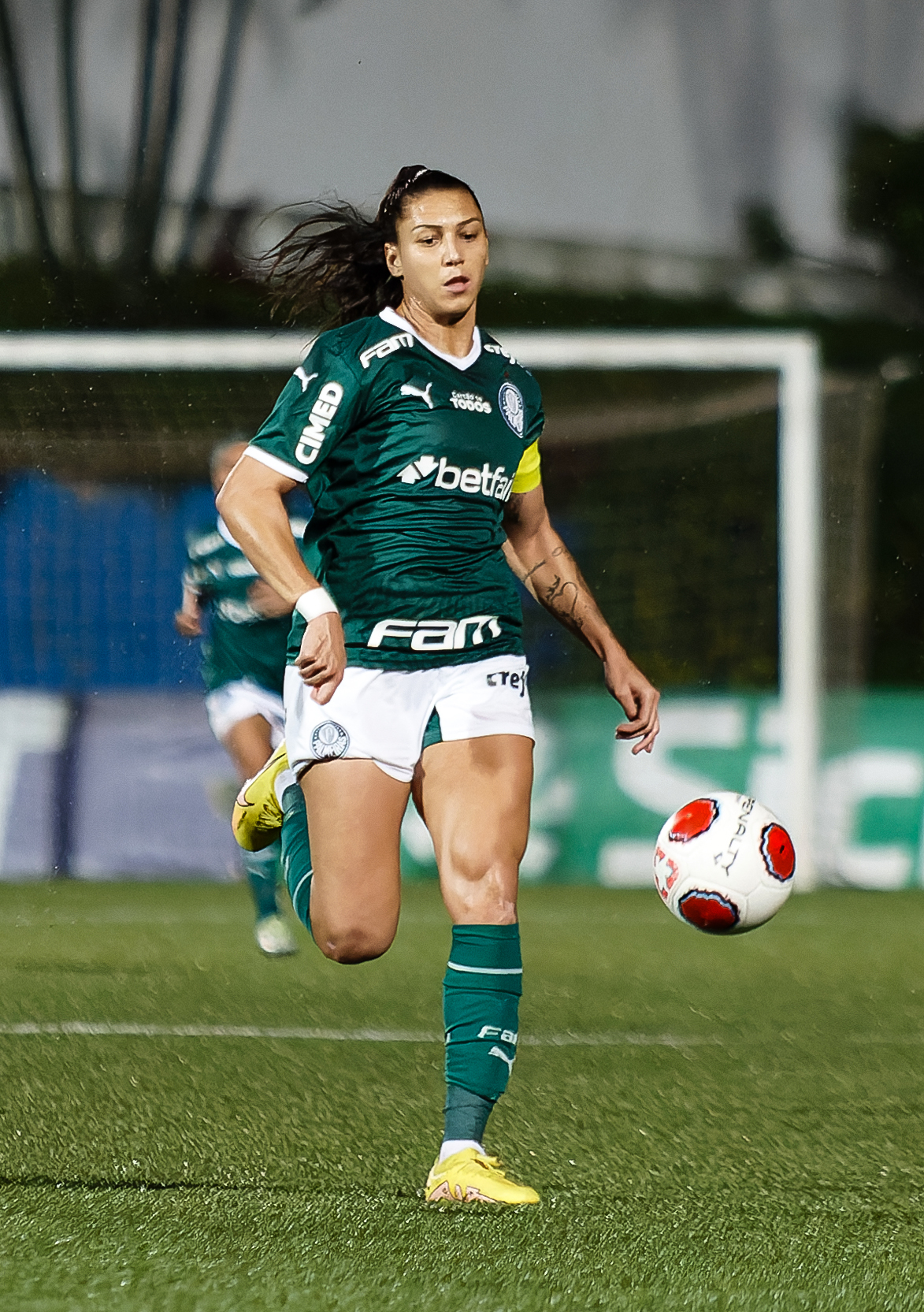
Zaneratto playing for Palmeiras in November 2022

In Palmeiras’ debut match at the 2023 Copa Libertadores Femenina, Zaneratto delivered a standout performance by scoring one goal and providing two assists in a 5–0 victory over Barcelona de Guayaquil. With this game, she also reached the milestone of 50 goals scored for the club.

=== Kansas City Current ===
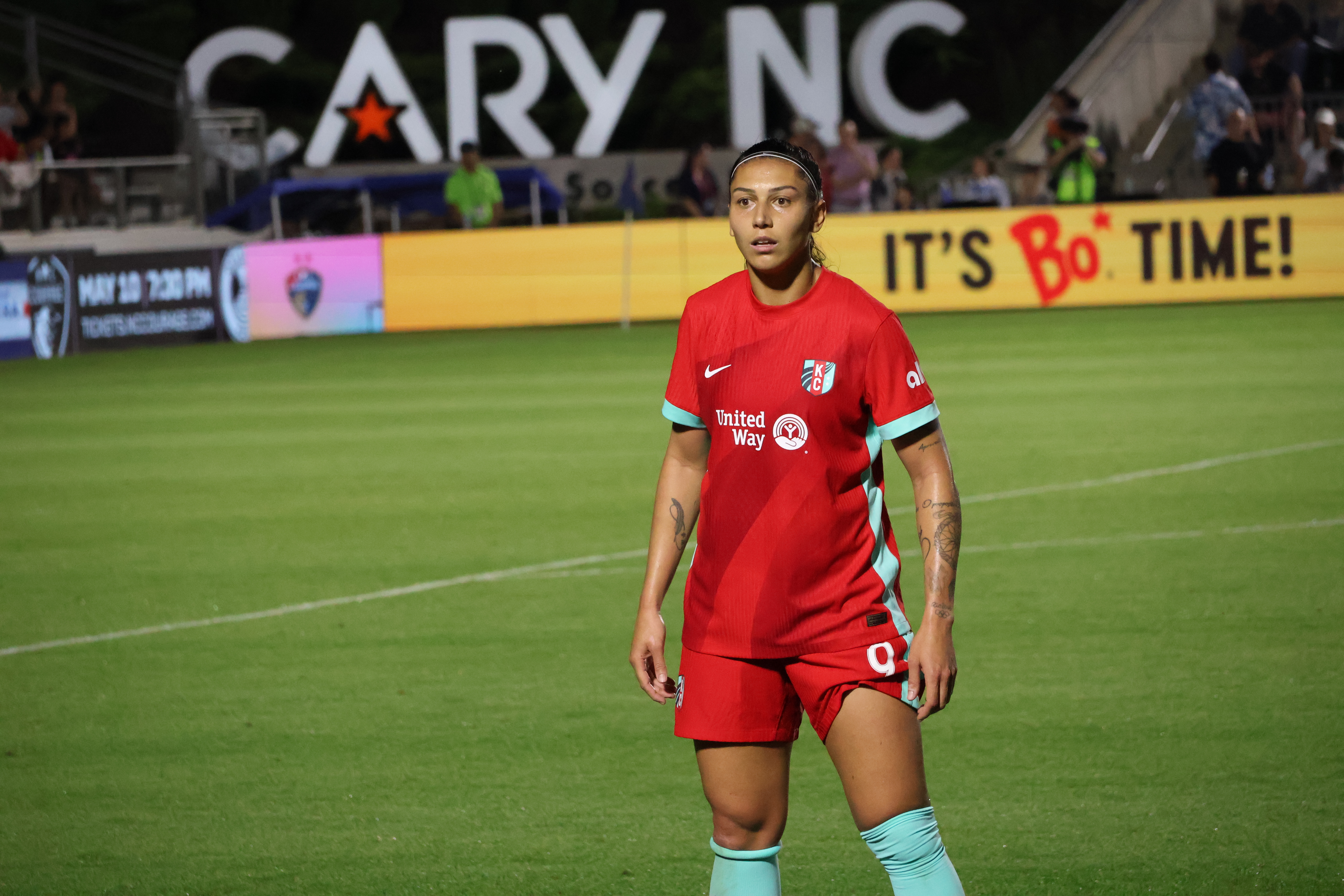
Zaneratto playing for Kansas City Current in April 2025

The Kansas City Current signed Bia on 22 January 2024, on a one-year contract with a one-year option. In the season opener on 16 March, she scored in the Current's 5–4 win over the Portland Thorns. She scored a brace to help beat Bay FC 5–2 on 20 April. She was named NWSL Player of the Month for March/April 2024, with four goals and three assists in that span.

On 10 November 2025, it was announced that Zaneratto was one of five finalists for the NWSL Most Valuable Player award, along with teammate Temwa Chawinga. Players from the Current made up one-third of all NWSL award nominees. While Chawinga went on to win MVP for a second consecutive season, Zaneratto was named to the NWSL Best XI Second Team.

=== Return to Palmeiras ===
On 7 January 2026, Zaneratto’s return was announced by Palmeiras on their website and social media accounts.

“It’s wonderful to be able to come home. All the affection I received while I was here, and even when I left, makes my heart beat faster when making the decision to return. Leaving the doors open also meant that my heart was always filled with this affection from the fans,” declared Bia Zaneratto.

== International career ==
Ahead of the inaugural 2008 FIFA U-17 Women's World Cup, a 14-year-old Bia Zaneratto was the youngest player in Brazil's squad and was highlighted as a "player to watch" by The New Zealand Herald newspaper.

In May 2011, she made her debut for the senior national team in a 3–0 friendly win over Chile at Estádio Rei Pelé in Maceió. Bia Zaneratto was named in Brazil's squad for the 2011 FIFA Women's World Cup in Germany and participated in the 3–0 group stage win over Equatorial Guinea.

In February 2015, Bia Zaneratto's club commitments in South Korea meant she was left out of Brazil's 18-month residency programme intended to prepare the national team for the 2015 FIFA Women's World Cup and the 2016 Rio Olympics. At the World Cup in Canada, Bia Zaneratto made substitute appearances in the final group game, a 1–0 win over Costa Rica, and the 1–0 second-round defeat by Australia.

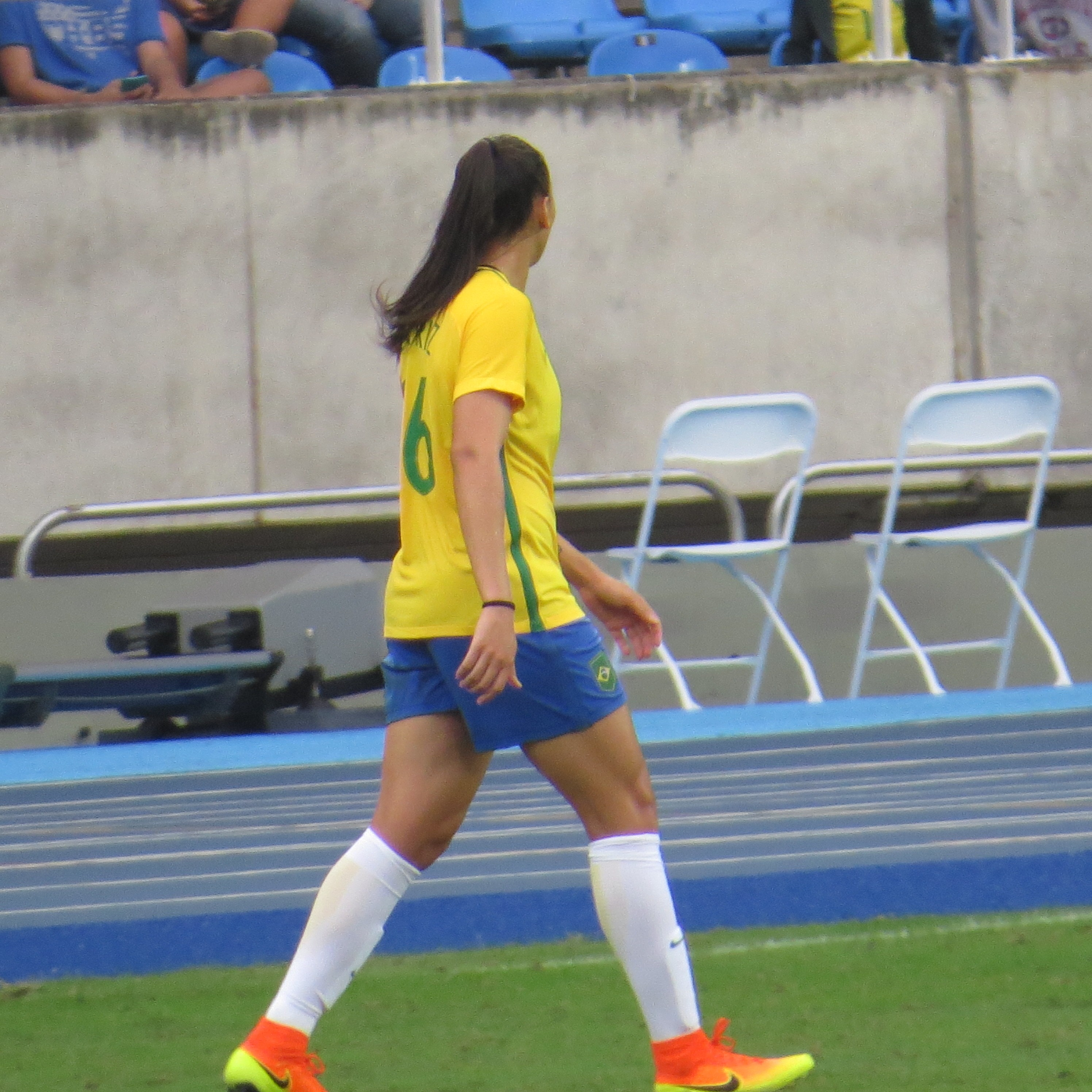
Zaneratto playing in the Brazil squad at the 2016 Summer Olympics

Bia Zaneratto was named to the Brazil squad for the 2016 Summer Olympics the country hosted, her first Olympic Games. She plundered three goals, including one in the Bronze Medal match, in which Brazil lost 2–1 to Canada to finish in fourth place. It was reported that her performances "lit up" the Games and made her a target for clubs in the American National Women's Soccer League, albeit her relatively high salary in South Korea made a transfer less likely.

At the 2019 SheBelieves Cup, Bia Zaneratto suffered a fractured fibula during Brazil's 1–0 defeat by hosts the United States in Tampa, Florida. Returning to the Olympic games at the 2020 Summer Olympics, Bia Zaneratto scored and had an assist in the opener against China.

At the 2023 FIFA Women's World Cup, Bia Zaneratto scored against Panama. Shortly before the 2024 Summer Olympics, Zaneratto suffered a stress fracture that forced her to not attend her third Olympic tournament.

== Career statistics ==
=== International goals ===
Scores and results list Brazil's goal tally first.

| Goal | Date | Location | Opponent | Score | Result | Competition |
|---|---|---|---|---|---|---|
| 1 | 2015-03-11 | Albufeira, Portugal | Switzerland | 2–0 | 4–1 | 2015 Algarve Cup |
| 2 | 2015-12-10 | Natal, Brazil | Trinidad and Tobago | 4–0 | 11–0 | Torneio Internacional Natal 2015 |
| 3 | 2015-12-10 | Natal, Brazil | Trinidad and Tobago | 7–0 | 11–0 | Torneio Internacional Natal 2015 |
| 4 | 2015-12-10 | Natal, Brazil | Trinidad and Tobago | 9–0 | 11–0 | Torneio Internacional Natal 2015 |
| 5 | 2016-03-07 | Lagos, Portugal | Russia | 2–0 | 3–0 | Algarve Cup 2016 |
| 6 | 2016-08-06 | Rio de Janeiro, Brazil | Sweden | 1–0 | 5–1 | Olympics 2016 |
| 7 | 2016-08-06 | Rio de Janeiro, Brazil | Sweden | 5–0 | 5–1 | Olympics 2016 |
| 8 | 2016-08-19 | São Paulo, Brazil | Canada | 1–2 | 1–2 | Olympics 2016 |
| 9 | 2016-12-07 | Manaus, Brazil | Costa Rica | 5–0 | 6–0 | Torneio Internacional 2016 |
| 10 | 2016-12-07 | Manaus, Brazil | Costa Rica | 6–0 | 6–0 | Torneio Internacional 2016 |
| 11 | 2016-12-11 | Manaus, Brazil | Russia | 1–0 | 4–0 | Torneio Internacional 2016 |
| 12 | 2016-12-11 | Manaus, Brazil | Russia | 3–0 | 4–0 | Torneio Internacional 2016 |
| 13 | 2016-12-14 | Manaus, Brazil | Italy | 1–0 | 5–3 | Torneio Internacional 2016 |
| 14 | 2017-10-19 | Chongqing, China | Mexico | 3–0 | 3–0 | 2017 Yongchuan International Tournament |
| 15 | 2017-11-26 | Ovalle, Chile | Chile | 3–0 | 4–0 | Friendly match |
| 16 | 2017-11-29 | La Serena, Chile | Chile | 1–0 | 3–0 | Friendly match |
| 17 | 2018-04-05 | Coquimbo, Chile | Argentina | 1–0 | 3–0 | Copa América 2018 |
| 18 | 2018-04-07 | Coquimbo, Chile | Ecuador | 2–0 | 8–0 | Copa América 2018 |
| 19 | 2018-04-07 | Coquimbo, Chile | Ecuador | 6–0 | 8–0 | Copa América 2018 |
| 20 | 2018-04-11 | Coquimbo, Chile | Venezuela | 2–0 | 4–0 | Copa América 2018 |
| 21 | 2018-04-11 | Coquimbo, Chile | Venezuela | 3–0 | 4–0 | Copa América 2018 |
| 22 | 2018-04-16 | La Serena, Chile | Chile | 2–0 | 3–1 | Copa América 2018 |
| 23 | 2018-07-29 | East Hartford, United States | Japan | 2–0 | 2–1 | 2018 Tournament of Nations |
| 24 | 2019-11-07 | Chongqing, China | Canada | 3–0 | 4–0 | 2019 Yongchuan International Tournament |
| 25 | 2019-11-07 | Chongqing, China | Canada | 4–0 | 4–0 | 2019 Yongchuan International Tournament |
| 26 | 2019-12-13 | São Paulo, Brazil | Mexico | 3–0 | 6–0 | Friendly game |
| 27 | 2019-12-13 | São Paulo, Brazil | Mexico | 5–0 | 6–0 | Friendly game |
| 28 | 2019-12-13 | São Paulo, Brazil | Mexico | 6–0 | 6–0 | Friendly game |
| 29 | 2021-07-21 | Rifu, Japan | China | 5–0 | 5–0 | 2020 Summer Olympics |
| 30 | 2022-04-11 | San Pedro del Pinatar, Spain | Hungary | 2–0 | 3–1 | Friendly game |
| 31 | 2022-07-10 | Armenia, Colombia | Argentina | 2–0 | 4–0 | Copa América 2022 |
| 32 | 2022-07-18 | Armenia, Colombia | Venezuela | 1–0 | 4–0 | Copa América 2022 |
| 33 | 2022-07-26 | Bucaramanga, Colombia | Paraguay | 2–0 | 2–0 | Copa América 2022 |
| 34 | 2022-09-05 | Durban, South Africa | South Africa | 3–0 | 6–0 | Friendly game |
| 35 | 2022-10-07 | Oslo, Norway | Norway | 0–2 | 1–4 | Friendly game |
| 36 | 2022-10-07 | Oslo, Norway | Norway | 1–3 | 1–4 | Friendly game |
| 37 | 2022-11-15 | São Paulo, Brazil | Canada | 1–0 | 2–1 | Friendly game |
| 38 | 2023-7-24 | Adelaide, Australia | Panama | 3–0 | 4–0 | 2023 FIFA Women's World Cup |
| 39 | 2023-11-30 | São Paulo, Brazil | Japan | 1–1 | 4–3 | Friendly game |
| 40 | 2023-11-30 | São Paulo, Brazil | Japan | 3–1 | 4–3 | Friendly game |
| 41 | 2024-03-02 | Los Angeles, United States | Argentina | 3–0 | 5–1 | 2024 CONCACAF W Gold Cup |
| 42 | 2024-03-02 | Los Angeles, United States | Argentina | 5–1 | 5–1 | 2024 CONCACAF W Gold Cup |
| 43 | 2025-10-25 | Manchester, England | England | 1–0 | 2–1 | Friendly |
| 44 | 2025-12-02 | Aveiro, Portugal | Portugal | 5–0 | 5–0 | Friendly |
| 44 | 2026-06-06 | São Paulo, Brazil | United States | 2–1 | 2–1 | Friendly |
| 45 | 2026-10-13 | São Lourenço da Mata, Brazil | Argentina | 1–0 | 2–2 | Friendly |

== Honours ==
Santos

- Copa Libertadores Femenina: 2010
- Campeonato Paulista de Futebol Feminino: 2010

Hyundai Steel Red Angels

- WK League: 2013, 2014, 2015, 2016, 2017, 2018, 2019

Wuhan Jianghan University

- Chinese Women's Super League: 2020

Palmeiras

- Copa Libertadores Femenina: 2022
- Campeonato Paulista de Futebol Feminino: 2022
- Supercopa do Brasil de Futebol Feminino: 2026

Kansas City Current

- NWSL Shield: 2025
- NWSL x Liga MX Femenil Summer Cup: 2024

Brazil

- Copa América Femenina: 2018

Individual

- WK League Top scorer: 2017
- WK League Top assists: 2017
- Bola de Ouro: 2021
- Bola de Prata: 2021, 2022
- Campeonato Brasileiro Série A1 Team of the Year: 2021, 2022

== See also ==
- List of women's footballers with 100 or more international caps
