= Barbra Banda =

Zambian footballer (born 2000)

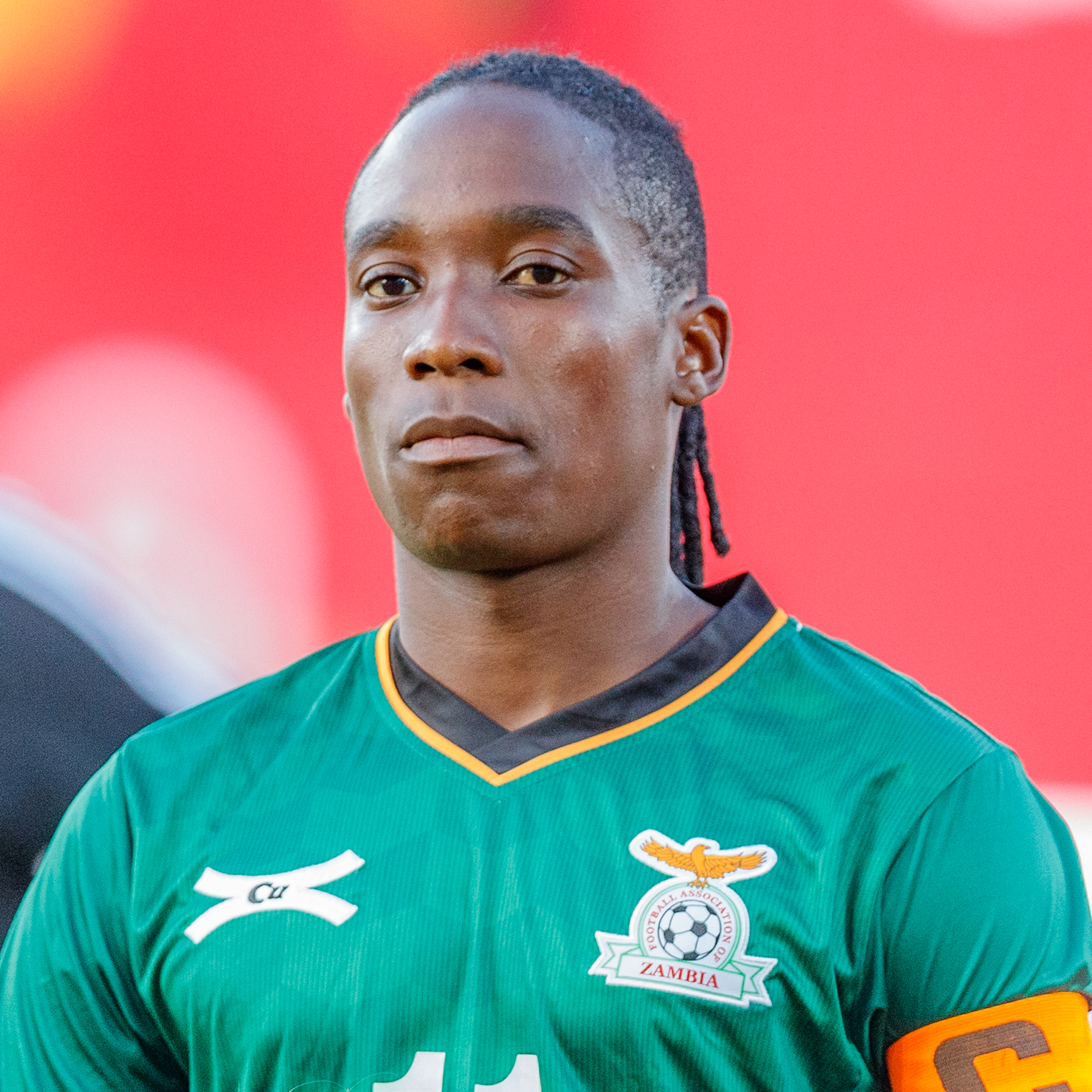
- Banda with Zambia in 2023

Personal information
- Date of birth: 20 March 2000 (age 26)
- Place of birth: Lusaka, Zambia
- Height: 1.78 m (5 ft 10 in)
- Position: Striker

Team information
- Current team: Orlando Pride
- Number: 11

Senior career*
Years	Team	Apps	(Gls)
2016–2018	Green Buffaloes		
2018–2020	Logroño	28	(15)
2020–2023	Shanghai Shengli	13	(18)
2024–	Orlando Pride	61	(38)

International career^{‡}
2014	Zambia U-17	3	(0)
2016–	Zambia	69	(64)
- * Club domestic league appearances and goals as of 03:22, 8 November 2026 (UTC) ‡ National team caps and goals as of 20:26, 28 July 2026 (UTC)

Barbra Banda (born 20 March 2000) is a Zambian professional footballer who plays as a striker for National Women's Soccer League (NWSL) club Orlando Pride and captains the Zambia national team.

Banda is widely considered one of the top women's players in the world. She is Africa's all-time top scorer in Olympic football history, having scored three hat tricks at two Olympic Games. She led Zambia to win the 2022 COSAFA Women's Cup, earning the Golden Ball with ten goals. In 2024, she was named African Women's Footballer of the Year, BBC Women's Footballer of the Year and to the FIFPRO Women's World 11.

In 2024, Banda signed with the Pride for the second-highest transfer fee in women's football history at the time. In her first season in the NWSL, she led the Pride to the NWSL Shield, 2024 NWSL Championship, and was named the NWSL Championship Most Valuable Player.

== Early life ==
Banda was born in Lusaka, the Zambian capital. She began playing football around the age of seven playing on the streets. Banda was inspired by her father who played football and would encourage her to practise. She played with boys as the academy she attended did not have a girls team. After her parents became concerned that her focus on the sport was interfering with schooling, she would sometimes sneak out and "throw them (boots) out the window, then go out the door, and they'd think maybe she's just going outside, and then I'd go round to get them."

== Club career ==
=== EDF Logroño, 2018–2020 ===
Banda signed with Spanish first division club EDF Logroño in October 2018 becoming the first woman Zambian footballer to play in Europe. She scored 16 goals in 28 matches with the club.

=== Shanghai Shengli, 2020–2023 ===
In January 2020, Banda signed with Chinese Super League club Shanghai Shengli. She scored in the 23rd minute of her debut for the club on 23 August. Banda went on to score 18 goals in 13 league matches to emerge as the 2020 Chinese Women's Super League Golden Boot winner for most goals scored in the league.

=== Orlando Pride, 2024–present ===
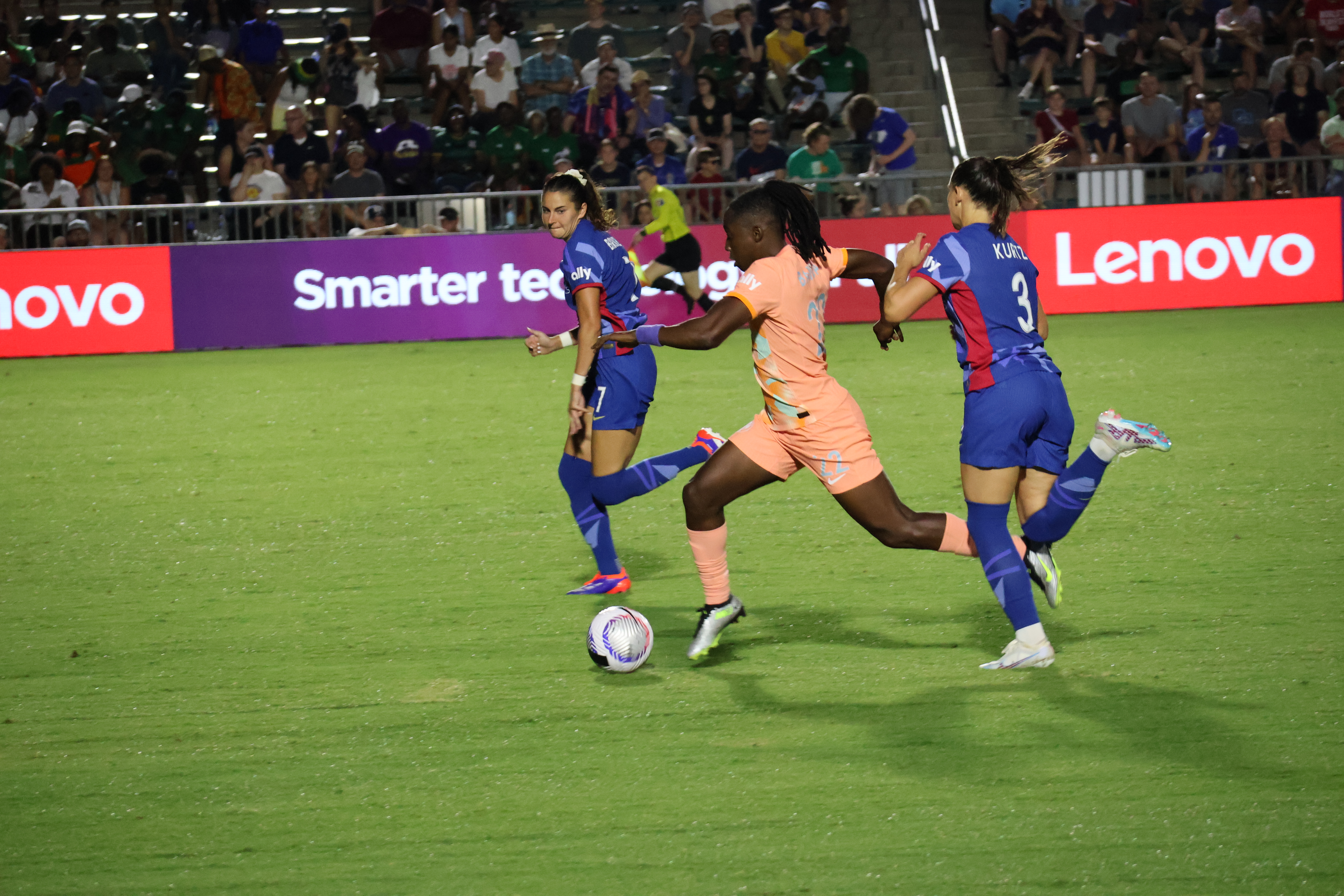
Banda in a match against the North Carolina Courage, June 2024

On 7 March 2024, the National Women's Soccer League club Orlando Pride announced that they had signed Banda to a four-year contract through the 2027 season. Transferred for a $740,000 fee, the transaction was the second-highest in women's football history at the time. Banda made her club debut off the bench in a 1–0 win over the San Diego Wave on 19 April. She made an impressive first start on 26 April, in which she assisted, scored, and drew a penalty in a 3–2 away win over the Washington Spirit. Banda scored eight goals in her first seven games, tying Sophia Smith for the Golden Boot lead. She was named NWSL Player of the Month for May with seven goals in five games, including three braces. On 7 July she scored her 12th goal of the season to open a battle between the league's last two undefeated teams, the Orlando Pride and the Kansas City Current, which ended as a 2–1 win for the Pride. Orlando won the 2024 NWSL Shield after finishing the regular season in first place, collecting the first trophy in club history. Banda's 13 goals in the season were second in the league only to Kansas City's record-setting scorer Temwa Chawinga.

On 8 November, in the first round of the 2024 NWSL Playoffs, Banda scored two times in a 4–1 win over the Chicago Red Stars. In the semifinals, she scored Orlando's second goal and assisted Marta for the third in Orlando's 3–2 win against the Kansas City Current. Banda scored the lone goal of the NWSL Championship Final on 23 November, threading the ball past Washington Spirit goalkeeper Aubrey Kingsbury at close range to secure a 1–0 victory. She was named the championship's MVP. Banda's performance throughout the 2024 NWSL season led to her being named to the NWSL Best XI, nominated for the Ballon d'Or and NWSL MVP, and voted the BBC Women's Footballer of the Year.

In the 2025 season, Banda set an NWSL record for the fastest hat trick, scoring three against the Utah Royals in the first 38 minutes. On 16 August 2025, she suffered a hip adductor injury in a match against Kansas City, ruling her out for the remainder of the 2025 regular season.

Banda returned to the field at the start of the 2026 season and was named to the March NWSL Team of the Month after netting three goals in her first three games back in action.

== International career ==
=== Junior ===
Banda represented the Zambia women's national under-17 football team in the 2014 FIFA U-17 Women's World Cup. She turned 14 during the tournament.

=== Senior ===
External videos
- Barbra Banda scores historic hat trick for Zambia retrieved 7 July 2023

On 6 March 2016, Banda made her senior team debut in a 2016 Women's Africa Cup of Nations qualification match against Namibia.

Banda captained the Zambian squad at the 2020 Olympics in Tokyo, the first time Zambia competed at the international tournament. During the team's first group stage match, Banda scored a hat trick against the Netherlands. The match ended 3–10, the worst ever loss for the Zambia women's national football team and the highest-scoring women's football match in Olympics history. In their second group match, Banda scored another hat trick against China with the match ending in a 4–4 draw. She became the first woman footballer in Olympic history to score back-to-back hat tricks and the first to score two hat tricks in one tournament. She is Africa's all-time top scorer in Olympic history.

On 6 July 2022, Banda and three teammates, including striker Racheal Kundananji, were ruled ineligible to compete for Zambia in the World Cup-qualifying tournament, Africa Cup of Nations, after a gender verification test found that their natural testosterone levels were above those allowed by the Confederation of African Football, which has stricter gender verification rules than the Olympics. The ruling sparked significant controversy, with Human Rights Watch describing it as a "clear violation" of her human rights. In August 2022, following Zambia's third-place finish at the tournament (and despite Banda not being able to compete), she and seven of her teammates were promoted by the Zambian Army. Banda was given the rank of sergeant, the highest among the group.

In September 2022, Banda led Zambia to win their first 2022 COSAFA Women's Cup, the top women's international football tournament for national teams from Southern Africa Her ten goals earned her the Golden Ball for the best player of the tournament. In June 2023, Banda was named to the Zambian squad for the 2023 FIFA Women's World Cup in Australia and New Zealand after being ruled eligible to compete by FIFA in December 2022.

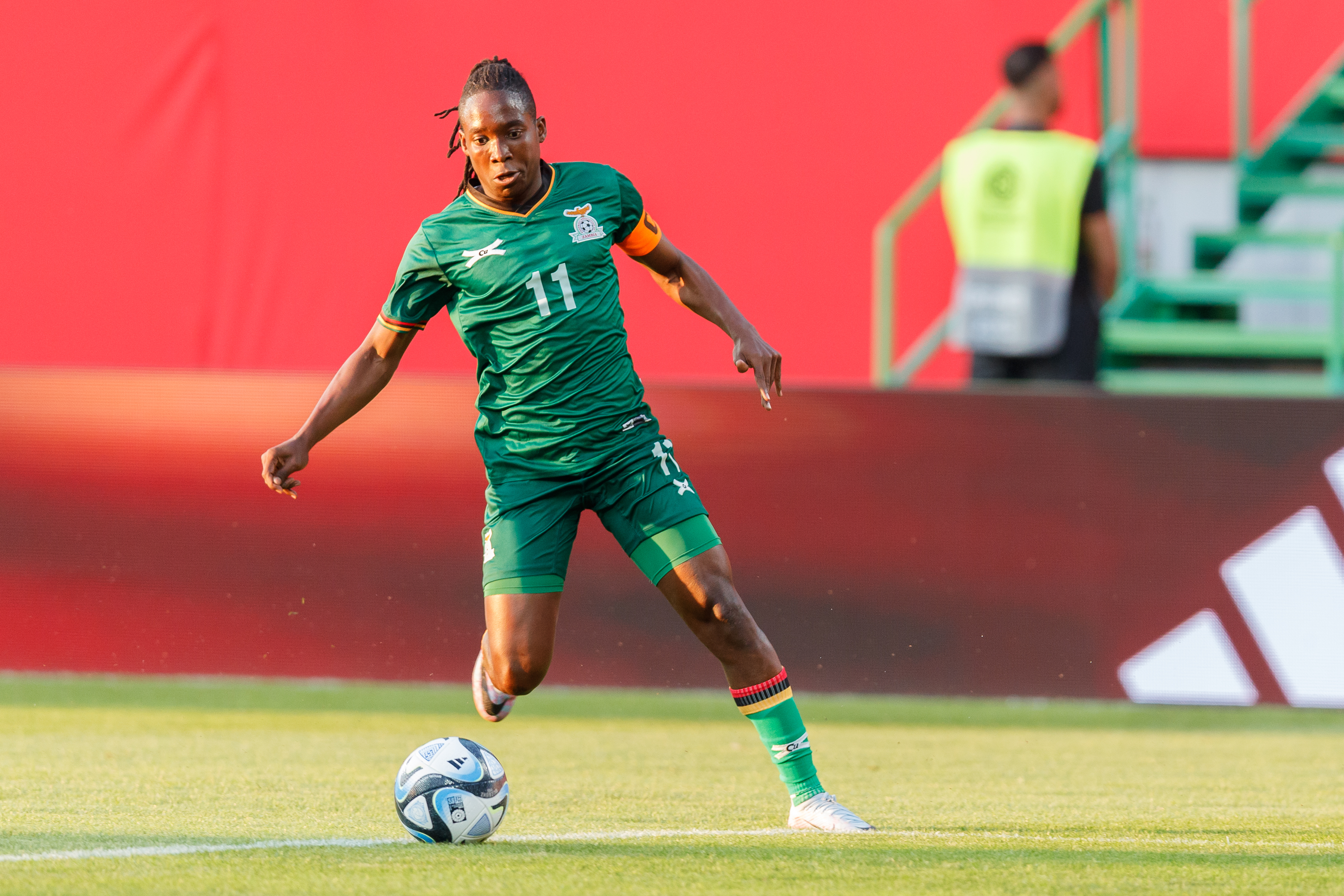
Banda during the 3–2 upset win over Germany, in a warm-up friendly match for 2023 FIFA Women's World Cup, 7 July 2023

On 7 July 2023, she scored two goals, including the game-winner in the 12th minute of injury time, against FIFA #2-ranked Germany, leading #77-ranked Zambia to an astounding 3–2 upset. Banda was named Player of the Match. Later that month, on 31 July, Banda won player of the match in Zambia's first win in a World Cup, a 3–1 victory over Costa Rica. In this game Banda scored Zambia's second-ever World Cup goal, a penalty kick which was also the 1,000th goal in Women's World Cup history. On 9 April 2024, she scored a brace in a 2–0 away extra-time victory over Morocco, qualifying her nation to the 2024 Summer Olympics by winning the home-and-away series 3–2 on aggregate.

On 3 July 2024, Banda was called up to the Zambia squad for the 2024 Summer Olympics. Although Zambia failed to advance past the group stage, Banda was the joint second-highest goalscorer of the tournament after netting 4 goals in 3 games. 3 of her goals combined for a hat-trick in Zambia's 6–5 loss to Australia.

November 2024 saw her voted the BBC Women's Footballer of the Year after getting the most reader votes. This came after her performances in the 2024 Olympics, NWSL season, and NWSL playoffs, as well as her becoming the second most expensive women's signing in history. Banda was the subject of an online attack by J. K. Rowling who implied that she is male. US Women's National Team Head Coach Emma Hayes and retired US midfielder Megan Rapinoe defended Banda. On 16 December 2024 Banda was voted the African Women's Footballer of the Year for 2024.

== Other work ==
External videos
- Zambia's Barbra Banda: The striker who is also a boxer retrieved 7 July 2023

After being inspired by Zambian professional boxer Catherine Phiri, Banda started boxing around age 14 first as an amateur and then after never losing a bout and other amateurs refusing to fight her, she turned professional. Banda competed in five professional bouts and won all five before opting to focus on football.

In 2021, Banda launched the Barbra Banda Foundation which aims to support programs that promote empowerment for women and girls on issues of economic inequality, gender-based violence, lack of access to equal opportunities, teenage pregnancies, and early marriages using the power of sport. The foundation co-hosts an annual football tournament. On the foundation, Banda said, "Like many, I did not come from a place of abundance and hence I understand what it means to need help and no one willing to help you. I have also experienced how much easier life gets when you have people ready to help you on your path to success."

Banda joined Common Goal in 2019 pledging at least 1% of her salary to a collective fund that supports football charities around the world.

== Style of play ==
Banda is considered one of the best women's players in the world. A goal-scorer, she possesses speed, positioning, and finishing in front of net. Banda notes Brazilian player Marta and Portuguese men's footballer Cristiano Ronaldo as players she admires.

== Career statistics ==
=== Club ===
As of match played 2 October 2026

Appearances and goals by club, season and competition
Club	Season	League			Cup (Note: Includes NWSL Challenge Cup)		Playoffs (Note: Includes NWSL playoffs)		Total	
Club	Season	Division	Apps	Goals	Apps	Goals	Apps	Goals	Apps	Goals
Logroño	2018–19	Primera División	17	8	—		—		17	8
Logroño	2019–20	Primera División	9	7	—		—		9	7
Logroño	Total		26	15	—		—		26	15
Shanghai Shengli	2020	Chinese Women's Super League	13	18	—		—		13	18
Orlando Pride	2024	NWSL	22	13	—		3	4	25	17
Orlando Pride	2025	NWSL	16	8	1	0	—		17	8
Orlando Pride	2026	NWSL	23	17	—		—		23	17
Orlando Pride	Total		60	37	1	0	3	4	64	42
Career total			99	71	1	0	3	4	102	75

== Honours ==
Orlando Pride

- NWSL Championship: 2024
- NWSL Shield: 2024

Zambia

- COSAFA Women's Championship: 2022

Individual

- Chinese Women's Super League Top scorer: 2020
- COSAFA Women's Championship top scorer: 2022
- IFFHS World's Best Woman International Goal Scorer: 2023
- BBC Women's Footballer of the Year: 2024
- NWSL Best XI First Team: 2024
- NWSL Championship Most Valuable Player: 2024
- FIFPRO Women's World 11: 2024 2025
- African Women's Footballer of the Year: 2024
- CAF Team of the Year Women's XI: 2023, 2024
- NWSL Best XI Second Team: 2026

== See also ==
- Women's Olympic football tournament records and statistics
- List of foreign Liga F players
