= Temwa Chaŵinga =

Malawian footballer (born 1998)

Temwa Chawinga
- Chawinga with the Kansas City Current in 2026

Personal information
- Date of birth: September 20, 1998 (age 28)
- Place of birth: Rhumpi, Malawi
- Height: 1.73 m (5 ft 8 in)
- Position: Forward

Team information
- Current team: Kansas City Current
- Number: 6

Senior career*
Years	Team	Apps	(Gls)
2017	Blantyre Zero	3	(29)
2017–2019	Kvarnsveden	57	(55)
2020–2023	Wuhan Jianghan	84	(83)
2024–	Kansas City Current	67	(47)

International career^{‡}
2016–	Malawi	20+	(30+)
Medal record
Women's Africa Cup of Nations
Silver medal – second place	2026 Morocco
- * Club domestic league appearances and goals as of 16:46, 14 November 2026 (UTC) ‡ National team caps and goals as of 15 October 2023

Temwa Chaŵinga (born September 20, 1998) is a Malawian professional footballer who plays as a forward for the Kansas City Current of the National Women's Soccer League (NWSL) and the Malawi national team. She won the NWSL Golden Boot and NWSL Most Valuable Player awards in both of her first two seasons with the Current.

The younger sister of Tabitha Chawinga, she joined her sister at Swedish club Kvarnsveden in 2017. Three years later, she moved to Wuhan Jianghan, winning four consecutive Chinese league titles and becoming the world's leading goal scorer in 2023. In 2024, she joined the Current and set the NWSL's single-season record with 20 league goals in her debut season. She led the Current to the NWSL Shield in dominant fashion in 2025 and won the NWSL Championship in 2026.

Chawinga made her international debut for Malawi in 2016. In 2023, she led Malawi to their first COSAFA Women's Championship title, and in 2026 led them to their first WAFCON final.

== Early life ==
Chaŵinga was born on September 20, 1998, in Rumphi district, Northern Region, Malawi. She is the youngest of five children. She is of Tumbuka ethnicity and her name Temwa means "love" in Tumbuka language. Her older sister, Tabitha Chawinga, is also a professional footballer.

== Club career ==
=== Kvarnsveden ===
Chaŵinga signed with Swedish club Kvarnsvedens IK in 2017., a club her sister Tabitha Chaŵinga had played for as well.

=== Wuhan Jianghan ===
In January 2020, Chaŵinga signed with Chinese Women's Super League club Wuhan Jianghan on a two-year contract. Her sister Tabitha played for Chinese reigning champions Jiangsu at the time. However, the COVID-19 pandemic soon began in Wuhan and the city was placed under lockdown for several months. After the league resumed play, Chawinga scored 9 goals in her debut season, second only to Shanghai Shengli's Barbra Banda, and helped Wuhan to the league title.

Chawinga was joined in Wuhan by her sister Tabitha in 2021. She fired 7 goals while her sister led the league with 9, repeating as league champions. In 2022, she led the league with 10 goals after Tabitha left for Inter Milan, helping win her third consecutive league title.

In 2023, Chawinga scored a total of 51 goals for Wuhan across all competitions and 12 for Malawi, making her the world's top goal scorer for the year, male or female. She helped the club to their record fourth consecutive league title.

=== Kansas City Current ===
==== 2024: Record-setting Golden Boot and MVP ====
On January 3, 2024, Chaŵinga signed a two-year contract with the Kansas City Current. She scored her first goal for the Current in a 4–2 win over Angel City FC on March 30, becoming the first Malawian goalscorer in NWSL history. She quickly impressed with four goals in her first five games and was named to the NWSL Team of the Month for March/April. She scored six goals in four games in the month of June, leading her to be named NWSL Player of the Month. She overtook the Orlando Pride's Zambian striker Barbra Banda for the Golden Boot lead with a brace against the Houston Dash on June 28, helping the Current win their then league record 17th undefeated regular season game in a row.

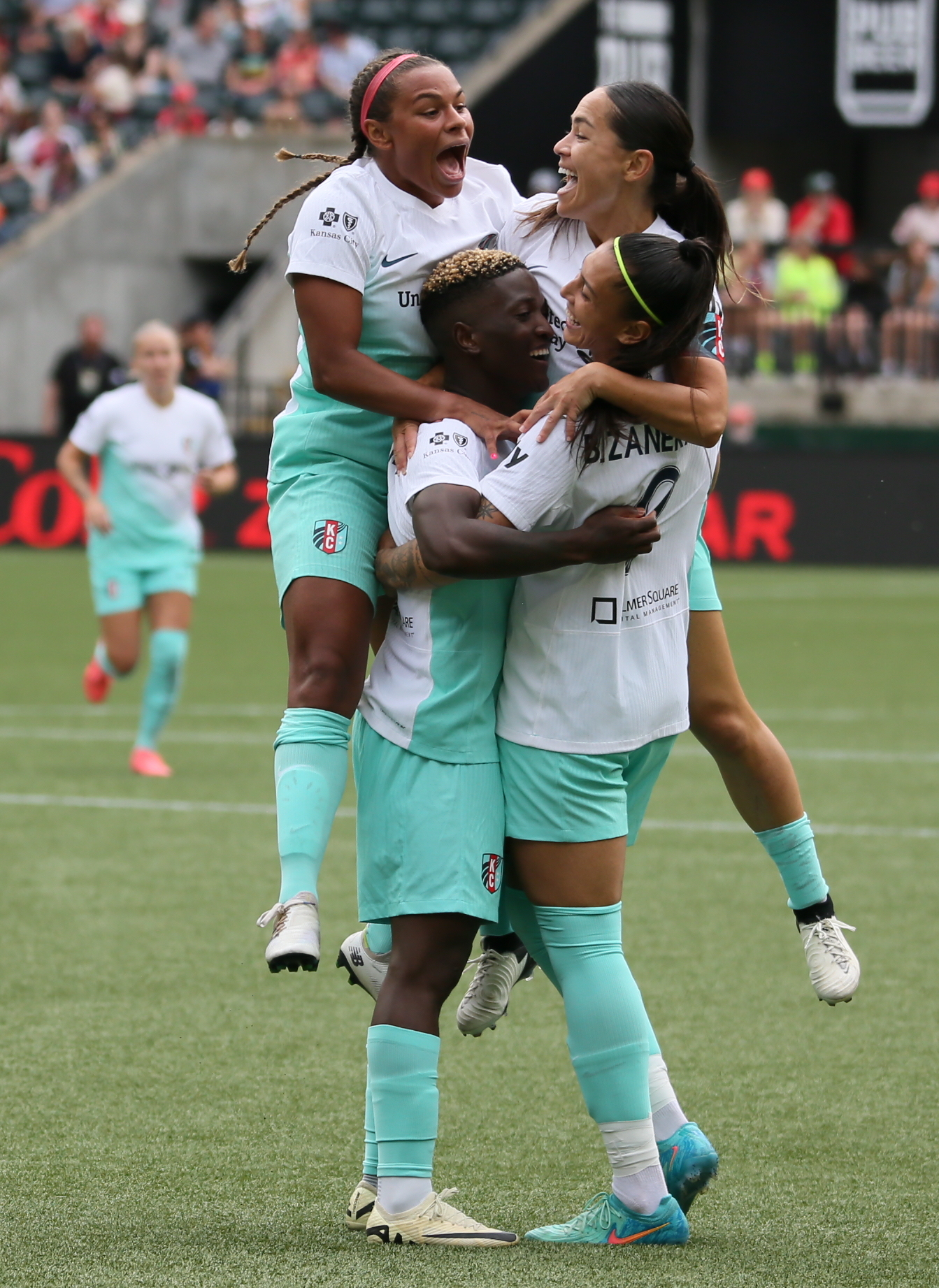
Goal celebration with the Current in 2024

Chaŵinga scored in a league-record eight regular-season games in a row from June 9 to September 7. She was again named NWSL Player of the Month with four goals in five games in September. She scored her 19th goal of the season in a 1–0 win over Bay FC on October 12, breaking Sam Kerr's single-season record of 18 goals in 2019. With her 20th goal against the San Diego Wave, she became the first NWSL player to score against all 13 other teams in one season. On October 26, she scored the only two goals in the final of the 2024 NWSL x Liga MX Femenil Summer Cup against NJ/NY Gotham FC. Chawinga became the first player in NWSL history to score 20 goals in a single season and was awarded the NWSL Golden Boot. She was also voted NWSL Most Valuable Player. She was ranked by The Guardian as the 19th best player in the world in 2024.

==== 2025: NWSL Shield and second MVP ====
Chawinga in 2026

On January 29, 2025, Chawinga signed a three-year contract extension to keep her with the Current through 2028. On May 16, she scored her 25th career NWSL regular-season goal in a 1–0 win over the Orlando Pride, becoming the fastest player to reach that mark (34 games). On September 20, she scored in a 2–0 win over the Seattle Reign, clinching the NWSL Shield with the best record in the league in record time. On October 18, she left the game against the Houston Dash with a leg injury in the first half.

Chawinga finished the 2025 regular season with 15 goals in 23 appearances to win the Golden Boot for a second consecutive time, joining Sam Kerr as the only players to win multiple times. The team set multiple NWSL records including most points, most wins, and fewest goals allowed in a season. She was unable to return from her injury for the playoffs as the Current were upset by Gotham FC in the quarterfinals. In 2025 she was named NWSL MVP for the second consecutive season, making her the first NWSL player to receive that award in two consecutive seasons. She was ranked by The Guardian as the sixth best player in the world in 2025.

==== 2026: NWSL Championship ====
After missing the first four games of the season, Chawinga returned from injury on April 4, 2026, recording an assist in 40 minutes of action as the Current won 2–1 against Gotham FC. On May 10, she scored her first goals back – scoring the first regular season hat trick in franchise history with all three in a 3–0 win over the Chicago Stars – and was named NWSL Player of the Week. On November 21st, she recorded an assist on Debinha's game winning goal of the 2026 NWSL Championship match.

== International career ==
In 2026, she was part of the Malawi national team for the 2026 Women's Africa Cup of Nations. On August 9, Chawinga scored an equaliser in a 2–1 quarter-final win against Ghana. The win resulted in Malawi securing a spot in the 2027 FIFA Women's World Cup, the nation's first-ever qualification to a World Cup. On August 12, Chawinga scored once in the semifinal against Algeria, which ended in a 3–1 for Malawi.. Chawinga won the golden boot as the top goal scorer, after a 3–0 defeat to Cameroon in the final..

== Personal life ==
Chaŵinga's older sister Tabitha is also a Malawian international footballer.

== Career statistics ==
=== International goals ===
Scores and results list Malawi's goal tally first, score column indicates score after each Chaŵinga goal.

List of international goals scored by Temwa Chaŵinga
No.	Date	Venue	Opponent	Score	Result	Competition
1	30 December 2016	Nankhaka Stadium, Lilongwe, Malawi	Zambia	1–1	2–3	Friendly
2	15 September 2017	Barbourfields Stadium, Bulawayo, Zimbabwe	Madagascar	3–0	6–3	2017 COSAFA Women's Championship
3	15 September 2017	Barbourfields Stadium, Bulawayo, Zimbabwe	Madagascar	4–0	6–3	2017 COSAFA Women's Championship
4	17 September 2017	Luveve Stadium, Bulawayo, Zimbabwe	Zimbabwe	1–2	3–3	2017 COSAFA Women's Championship
5	4 April 2019	Kamuzu Stadium, Blantyre, Malawi	Mozambique	2–0	11–1	2020 CAF Women's Olympic Qualifying Tournament
6	4 April 2019	Kamuzu Stadium, Blantyre, Malawi	Mozambique	4–0	11–1	2020 CAF Women's Olympic Qualifying Tournament
7	4 April 2019	Kamuzu Stadium, Blantyre, Malawi	Mozambique	5–0	11–1	2020 CAF Women's Olympic Qualifying Tournament
8	4 April 2019	Kamuzu Stadium, Blantyre, Malawi	Mozambique	7–0	11–1	2020 CAF Women's Olympic Qualifying Tournament
9	4 April 2019	Kamuzu Stadium, Blantyre, Malawi	Mozambique	10–0	11–1	2020 CAF Women's Olympic Qualifying Tournament
10	9 April 2019	Estádio do Zimpeto, Maputo, Mozambique	Mozambique	1–0	3-0	2020 CAF Women's Olympic Qualifying Tournament
11	7 November 2020	Wolfson Stadium, Ibhayi, South Africa	Lesotho	3–0	9–0	2020 COSAFA Women's Championship
12	9 November 2020	Wolfson Stadium, Ibhayi, South Africa	Zambia	1–0	1–0	2020 COSAFA Women's Championship
13	12 November 2020	Wolfson Stadium, Ibhayi, South Africa	South Africa	1–1	2–6	2020 COSAFA Women's Championship
14	25 September 2023	Mpria Stadium, Blantyre, Malawi	Seychelles	12–0	17–0	Friendly
15	25 September 2023	Mpria Stadium, Blantyre, Malawi	Seychelles	13–0	17–0	Friendly
16	25 September 2023	Mpria Stadium, Blantyre, Malawi	Seychelles	14–0	17–0	Friendly
17	4 October 2023	Lucas Moripe Stadium, Pretoria, South Africa	South Africa	2–1	4–3	2023 COSAFA Women's Championship
18	4 October 2023	Lucas Moripe Stadium, Pretoria, South Africa	South Africa	3–1	4–3	2023 COSAFA Women's Championship
19	4 October 2023	Lucas Moripe Stadium, Pretoria, South Africa	South Africa	4–1	4–3	2023 COSAFA Women's Championship
20	7 October 2023	Lucas Moripe Stadium, Pretoria, South Africa	Eswatini	5–0	8–0	2023 COSAFA Women's Championship
21	7 October 2023	Lucas Moripe Stadium, Pretoria, South Africa	Eswatini	6–0	8–0	2023 COSAFA Women's Championship
22	7 October 2023	Lucas Moripe Stadium, Pretoria, South Africa	Eswatini	7–0	8–0	2023 COSAFA Women's Championship
23	7 October 2023	Lucas Moripe Stadium, Pretoria, South Africa	Eswatini	8–0	8–0	2023 COSAFA Women's Championship
24	13 October 2023	Lucas Moripe Stadium, Pretoria, South Africa	Mozambique	1–1	2–1	2023 COSAFA Women's Championship
25	13 October 2023	Lucas Moripe Stadium, Pretoria, South Africa	Mozambique	2–1	2–1	2023 COSAFA Women's Championship
26	28 July 2026	Al Medina Stadium, Rabat, Morocco	Nigeria	1–0	3–2	2026 Women's Africa Cup of Nations
27	28 July 2026	Al Medina Stadium, Rabat, Morocco	Nigeria	3–1	3–2	2026 Women's Africa Cup of Nations
28	1 August 2026	Moulay El Hassan Stadium, Rabat, Morocco	Egypt	3–0	3–1	2026 Women's Africa Cup of Nations
29	9 August 2026	Al Medina Stadium, Rabat, Morocco	Ghana	1–1	2–1	2026 Women's Africa Cup of Nations
30	12 August 2026	Rabat Olympic Stadium, Rabat, Morocco	Algeria	2–0	3–1	2026 Women's Africa Cup of Nations
31	9 October 2026	Bingu National Stadium, Lilongwe, Malawi	Zimbabwe	1–0	2–0	2028 CAF Women's Olympic qualifying tournament
32	13 October 2026	National Sports Stadium, Harare, Zimbabwe	Zimbabwe	1–0	7–0	2028 CAF Women's Olympic qualifying tournament
33	13 October 2026	National Sports Stadium, Harare, Zimbabwe	Zimbabwe	2–0	7–0	2028 CAF Women's Olympic qualifying tournament
34	13 October 2026	National Sports Stadium, Harare, Zimbabwe	Zimbabwe	4–0	7–0	2028 CAF Women's Olympic qualifying tournament

== Honors and awards ==
Wuhan Jianghan University

- Chinese Women's Super League: 2020, 2021, 2022, 2023

Kansas City Current

- NWSL Championship: 2026
- NWSL Shield: 2025
- NWSL x Liga MX Femenil Summer Cup: 2024

Individual

- NWSL Most Valuable Player: 2024 2025
- NWSL Golden Boot: 2024, 2025
- NWSL Best XI First Team: 2024 2025
- NWSL Best XI Second Team: 2026
- Chinese Women's Super League Golden Boot: 2022, 2023
- Women's Africa Cup of Nations Top scorer: 2026
- Women's Africa Cup of Nations Team of the Tournament: 2026
