= NWSL Team of the Month =

American women's soccer award

The National Women's Soccer League Team of the Month, also called the Best XI of the Month since 2022, is a monthly women's soccer award given to individual players in the National Women's Soccer League (NWSL).

== Selection ==
This award began in 2017. From 2017 to 2021 it was named the "Team of the Month", and since 2022 it has been named the "Best XI of the Month".

From 2017 to 2022, the NWSL Media Association, composed of journalists who regularly cover the league, select eleven players deemed to have put in the best performances over the past month. Since 2023, the NWSL Media Association and the league's broadcast talent select the players.

== Winners ==
=== 2017 ===
Month	Goalkeeper	Defenders	Midfielders	Forwards	Ref.
April	(Canada) Stephanie Labbé, WAS	(Cameroon) Estelle Johnson, WAS; (United States) Becky Sauerbrunn, KC; (United States) Emily Sonnett, POR	(United States) Julie Ertz, CHI; (Brazil) Debinha, NC; (United States) Rose Lavelle, BOS; (Wales) Jess Fishlock, SEA; (United States) Sam Mewis, NC	(United States) Kealia Ohai, HOU; (United States) Lynn Williams, NC	
May	(Canada) Kailen Sheridan, NJ	(United States) Samantha Johnson, CHI; (United States) Becky Sauerbrunn, KC (2); (United States) Casey Short, CHI	(United States) Danielle Colaprico, CHI; (France) Amandine Henry, POR; (United States) Rose Lavelle, BOS (2); (United States) Sarah Killion, NJ	(Japan) Nahomi Kawasumi, SEA; (United States) Christen Press, CHI; (Australia) Sam Kerr, NJ	
June	(Canada) Stephanie Labbé, WAS (2)	(United States) Casey Short, CHI (2); (United States) Abby Dahlkemper, NC; (United States) Ali Krieger, ORL; (Cameroon) Estelle Johnson, WAS (2)	(Brazil) Marta, ORL; (United States) Sam Mewis, NC (2); (Wales) Jess Fishlock, SEA (2)	(United States) Megan Rapinoe, SEA; (Australia) Sam Kerr, NJ (2); (United States) Ashley Hatch, NC	
July	(United States) Jane Campbell, HOU	(United States) Taylor Smith, NC; (United States) Abby Dahlkemper, NC (2); (United States) Amber Brooks, HOU; (United States) Casey Short, CHI (3)	(Brazil) Marta, ORL (2); (United States) McCall Zerboni, NC; (United States) Julie Ertz, CHI (2); (Brazil) Andressinha, HOU	(United States) Megan Rapinoe, SEA (2); (Australia) Sam Kerr, NJ (3)	
August	(United States) Katelyn Rowland, NC	(United States) Emily Sonnett, POR (2); (Australia) Steph Catley, ORL; (United States) Ali Krieger, ORL (2); (United States) Taylor Smith, NC (2)	(Brazil) Marta, ORL (3); (United States) Sam Mewis, NC (3); (United States) Lindsey Horan, POR	(Australia) Hayley Raso, POR; (United States) Alex Morgan, ORL; (Australia) Sam Kerr, NJ (4)	
September	(United States) Adrianna Franch, POR	(United States) Emily Menges, POR; (United States) Kelley O'Hara, NJ; (United States) Becky Sauerbrunn, KC (3); (United States) Casey Short, CHI (4)	(United States) Alanna Kennedy, ORL; (Brazil) Marta, ORL (4); (United States) Sam Mewis, NC (4)	(United States) Shea Groom, KC; (Canada) Christine Sinclair, POR; (United States) Lynn Williams, NC (2)	

=== 2018 ===
Month	Goalkeeper	Defenders	Midfielders	Forwards	Ref.
March	(United States) Jane Campbell, HOU	(United States) Jaelene Hinkle, NC; (United States) Becky Sauerbrunn, UTA; (United States) Emily Sonnett, POR; (England) Rachel Daly, HOU	(United States) Lindsey Horan, POR; (Brazil) Debinha, NC; (Iceland) Gunnhildur Jónsdóttir, UTA	(United States) Megan Rapinoe, SEA; (United States) Mallory Pugh, WAS; (United States) Crystal Dunn, NC	
April	(United States) Aubrey Bledsoe, WAS	(United States) Jaelene Hinkle, NC (2); (Cameroon) Estelle Johnson, WAS; (United States) Becky Sauerbrunn, UTA (2); (United States) Emily Sonnett, POR (2)	(United States) Sofia Huerta, CHI; (United States) Crystal Dunn, NC (2); (United States) McCall Zerboni, NC	(Nigeria) Francisca Ordega, WAS; (United States) Jessica McDonald, NC; (United States) Mallory Pugh, WAS (2)	
May	(United States) Abby Smith, UTA	(Australia) Steph Catley, SEA; (New Zealand) Abby Erceg, NC; (United States) Becky Sauerbrunn, UTA (3); (United States) Ali Krieger, ORL	(United States) Kristie Mewis, HOU; (United States) Lindsey Horan, POR (2); (United States) McCall Zerboni, NC (2)	(England) Rachel Daly, HOU (2); (Canada) Christine Sinclair, POR; (United States) Crystal Dunn, NC (3)	
June	(United States) Alyssa Naeher, CHI	(United States) Becca Moros, UTA; (New Zealand) Abby Erceg, NC (2); (United States) Becky Sauerbrunn, UTA (4); (United States) Merritt Mathias, NC	(United States) Lindsey Horan, POR (3); (Japan) Yuki Nagasato, CHI; (United States) McCall Zerboni, NC (3)	(United States) Kealia Ohai, HOU; (Canada) Christine Sinclair, POR (2); (United States) Crystal Dunn, NC (4)	
July	(United States) Adrianna Franch, POR	(United States) Katie Naughton, CHI; (New Zealand) Abby Erceg, NC (3); (Scotland) Rachel Corsie, UTA; (Denmark) Theresa Nielsen, SEA	(United States) Lindsey Horan, POR (4); (Japan) Yuki Nagasato, CHI (2); (United States) McCall Zerboni, NC (4)	(United States) Megan Rapinoe, SEA (2); (England) Rachel Daly, HOU (3); (Australia) Sam Kerr, CHI	
August	(Australia) Lydia Williams, SEA	(United States) Megan Oyster, SEA; (New Zealand) Abby Erceg, NC (4); (United States) Taylor Comeau, HOU; (Denmark) Theresa Nielsen, SEA (2)	(United States) Lindsey Horan, POR (5); (United States) Sofia Huerta, HOU (2); (United States) Vanessa DiBernardo, CHI	(United States) Lynn Williams, NC; (United States) Tobin Heath, POR; (Australia) Sam Kerr, CHI (2)	

=== 2019 ===
Month	Goalkeeper	Defenders	Midfielders	Forwards	Ref.
April	(Canada) Kailen Sheridan, NJ	(United States) Casey Short, CHI; (United States) Becky Sauerbrunn, UTA; (New Zealand) Abby Erceg, NC; (United States) Meghan Klingenberg, POR	(Canada) Christine Sinclair, POR; (Japan) Yuki Nagasato, CHI; (United States) Crystal Dunn, NC	(United States) Christen Press, UTA; (Australia) Sam Kerr, CHI; (United States) Tobin Heath, POR	
May	(United States) Aubrey Bledsoe, WAS	(United States) Casey Short, CHI (2); (Scotland) Rachel Corsie, UTA; (United States) Sam Staab, WAS; (United States) Merritt Mathias, NC	(Japan) Yuki Nagasato, CHI (2); (United States) Jordan DiBiasi, WAS; (Spain) Verónica Boquete, UTA	(Australia) Sam Kerr, CHI (2); (United States) Amy Rodriguez, UTA; (United States) Ashley Hatch, WAS	
June	(United States) Aubrey Bledsoe, WAS (2)	(United States) Casey Short, CHI (3); (United States) Sam Staab, WAS (2); (United States) Megan Oyster, RFC; (United States) Katherine Reynolds, POR	(United States) Andi Sullivan, WAS; (Wales) Jess Fishlock, RFC; (United States) Kristen Hamilton, NC	(United States) Margaret Purce, POR; (United States) Amy Rodriguez, UTA (2); (United States) Ifeoma Onumonu, RFC	
July	(Canada) Kailen Sheridan, NJ (2)	(United States) Casey Short, CHI (4); (United States) Sarah Gorden, CHI; (New Zealand) Abby Erceg, NC (2); (United States) Merritt Mathias, NC (2)	(United States) Vanessa DiBernardo, CHI; (Brazil) Debinha, NC; (United States) Gabby Seiler, POR	(United States) Kristen Hamilton, NC (2); (Australia) Sam Kerr, CHI (3); (Brazil) Marta, ORL	
August	(United States) Aubrey Bledsoe, WAS (3)	(United States) Casey Short, CHI (5); (United States) Emily Menges, POR; (New Zealand) Abby Erceg, NC (3); (United States) Jaelene Hinkle, NC	(United States) Lo'eau LaBonta, UTA; (Brazil) Debinha, NC (2); (Canada) Christine Sinclair, POR (2)	(United States) Christen Press, UTA (2); (United States) Margaret Purce, POR (2); (United States) Amy Rodriguez, UTA (3)	
September	(United States) Alyssa Naeher, CHI	(United States) Casey Short, CHI (6); (United States) Julie Ertz, CHI; (United States) Lauren Barnes, RFC; (United States) Jaelene Hinkle, NC (2)	(United States) Beverly Yanez, RFC; (Brazil) Debinha, NC (3); (United States) Morgan Brian, CHI	(Japan) Yuki Nagasato, CHI (3); (Australia) Sam Kerr, CHI (4); (United States) Lynn Williams, NC	

=== 2020 ===
The 2020 NWSL regular season was cancelled due to the COVID-19 pandemic.

=== 2021 ===
Month	Goalkeeper	Defenders	Midfielders	Forwards	Ref.
May	(Canada) Kailen Sheridan, NJY	(United States) Caprice Dydasco, NJY; (United States) Emily Fox, LOU; (United States) Phoebe McClernon, ORL; (United States) Carson Pickett, NC	(Brazil) Debinha, NC; (United States) Crystal Dunn, POR; (Wales) Jess Fishlock, RGN	(United States) Sydney Leroux, ORL; (United States) Alex Morgan, ORL; (United States) Mallory Pugh, CHI	
June	(United States) Michelle Betos, LOU	(United States) Caprice Dydasco, NJY; (New Zealand) Abby Erceg, NC; (United States) Courtney Petersen, ORL; (United States) Becky Sauerbrunn, POR	(United States) Tori Huster, WAS; (United States) Kristie Mewis, HOU; (United States) Sam Mewis, NC	(Brazil) Marta, ORL; (United States) Trinity Rodman, WAS; (United States) Lynn Williams, NC	
July	(United States) Bella Bixby, POR	(United States) Caprice Dydasco, NJY; (United States) Emily Menges, POR; (United States) Meghan Klingenberg, POR; (United States) Katie Naughton, HOU	(United States) Andi Sullivan, WAS; (United States) Allie Long, NJY; (United States) Morgan Gautrat, CHI	(United States) Sydney Leroux, ORL (2); (United States) Mallory Pugh, CHI (2); (United States) Ashley Hatch, WAS	
August	(United States) Casey Murphy, NC	(United States) Caprice Dydasco, NJY (4); (United States) Emily Menges, POR (2); (United States) Ali Krieger, ORL; (United States) Carson Pickett, NC (2)	(Wales) Jess Fishlock, RGN (2); (Republic of Ireland) Denise O'Sullivan, NC; (United States) Angela Salem, POR	(Denmark) Nadia Nadim, LOU; (Nigeria) Ifeoma Onumonu, NJY; (United States) Megan Rapinoe, RGN	
September	(Canada) Kailen Sheridan, NJY (2)	(United States) Tierna Davidson, CHI; (United States) Sofia Huerta, RGN; (Cameroon) Estelle Johnson, NJY; (United States) Casey Krueger, CHI	(United States) Morgan Gautrat, CHI (2); (Germany) Dzsenifer Marozsán, RGN; (United States) Angela Salem, POR (2)	(United States) Bethany Balcer, RGN; (England) Rachel Daly, HOU; (France) Eugénie Le Sommer, RGN	
October	(United States) Aubrey Bledsoe, WAS	(United States) Caprice Dydasco, NJY (5); (United States) Sofia Huerta, RGN (2); (United States) Sarah Gorden, CHI; (United States) Sam Staab, WAS	(Wales) Jess Fishlock, RGN (3); (United States) Morgan Gautrat, CHI (3); (United States) Angela Salem, POR (3)	(United States) Ashley Hatch, WAS (2); (United States) Margaret Purce, NJY; (United States) Trinity Rodman, WAS (2)	

=== 2022 ===
Month	Goalkeeper	Defenders	Midfielders	Forwards	Ref.
May	(United States) Phallon Tullis-Joyce, RGN	(United States) Naomi Girma, SD; (United States) Alana Cook, RGN; (United States) Sofia Huerta, RGN; (Canada) Vanessa Gilles, LA	(United States) Taylor Kornieck, SD; (United States) Rose Lavelle, RGN; (United States) Savannah DeMelo, LOU	(United States) Alex Morgan, SD; (England) Rachel Daly, HOU; (United States) Mallory Pugh, CHI	
June	(United States) Bella Bixby, POR	(United States) Carson Pickett, NC; (United States) Tatumn Milazzo, CHI; (United States) Naomi Girma, SD (2); (Finland) Natalia Kuikka, POR	(Brazil) Debinha, NC; (United States) Sam Coffey, POR; (United States) Taylor Kornieck, SD (2)	(United States) Alex Morgan, SD (2); (United States) Sophia Smith, POR; (United States) Mallory Pugh, CHI (2)	
July	(United States) Adrianna Franch, KC	(United States) Carson Pickett, NC (2); (United States) Kristen Edmonds, KC; (United States) Kelli Hubly, POR; (United States) Hailie Mace, KC	(Japan) Hina Sugita, POR; (Wales) Jess Fishlock, RGN; (United States) Lo'eau LaBonta, KC	(United States) Morgan Weaver, POR; (England) Ebony Salmon, HOU; (United States) Bethany Balcer, RGN	
August	(United States) Adrianna Franch, KC (2)	(United States) Elizabeth Ball, KC; (United States) Naomi Girma, SD (3); (United States) Sofia Huerta, RGN (2); (United States) Carson Pickett, NC (3)	(United States) Meggie Dougherty Howard, ORL; (United States) Lo'eau LaBonta, KC (2); (United States) Cari Roccaro, LA	(Mexico) Diana Ordoñez, NC; (United States) Megan Rapinoe, RGN; (England) Ebony Salmon, HOU (2)	
September /October	(United States) Katie Lund, LOU	(United States) Alana Cook, RGN; (United States) Naomi Girma, SD (4); (United States) Hailie Mace, KC (2); (United States) Carson Pickett, NC (4)	(United States) Sam Coffey, POR (2); (United States) Vanessa DiBernardo, CHI; (United States) Rose Lavelle, RGN (2)	(Brazil) Debinha, NC; (United States) Megan Rapinoe, RGN (2); (United States) Sophia Smith, POR (2)	

=== 2023 ===
Month	Goalkeeper	Defenders	Midfielders	Forwards	Ref.
March/April	(United States) Phallon Tullis-Joyce, RGN	(United States) Emily Fox, NC; (United States) Naomi Girma, SD; (United States) Becky Sauerbrunn, POR; (United States) Sam Staab, WAS	(Brazil) Debinha, KC; (United States) Crystal Dunn, POR; (Wales) Jess Fishlock, RGN	(United States) Bethany Balcer, RGN; (United States) Sophia Smith, POR; (United States) Lynn Williams, NJY	
May	(United States) Abby Smith, NJY	(United States) Kylie Strom, ORL; (United States) Naomi Girma, SD (2); (United States) Sam Staab, WAS (2); (Brazil) Bruninha, NJNY	(United States) Jenna Nighswonger, NJNY; (United States) Savannah DeMelo, LOU; (United States) Crystal Dunn, POR (2)	(United States) Megan Rapinoe, RGN; (United States) Lynn Williams, NJNY (2); (United States) Veronica Latsko, RGN	
June	(United States) Casey Murphy, NC	(New Zealand) Abby Erceg, LOU; (United States) Sofia Huerta, OL; (United States) Kaleigh Kurtz, NC; (United States) M.A. Vignola, LA	(United States) Sam Coffey, POR; (Brazil) Debinha, KC (2); (United States) Savannah DeMelo, LOU (2)	(Brazil) Kerolin, NC; (United States) Sophia Smith, POR (2); (United States) Lynn Williams, NJNY (3)	
July	(United States) Emily Boyd, CHI	(United States) Malia Berkely, NCC; (New Zealand) Abby Erceg, LOU (2); (United States) Sarah Gorden, LA; (United States) Paige Monaghan, LOU	(United States) Savannah McCaskill, LA; (Japan) Narumi Miura, NCC; (United States) Jenna Nighswonger, NJNY (2)	(United States) Ashley Hatch, WAS; (United States) Kristen Hamilton, KC; (United States) Midge Purce, NJY	
August	(United States) Adrianna Franch, KCC	(United States) Abby Dahlkemper, SD; (United States) Casey Krueger, CHI (2); (United States) Jenna Nighswonger, NJNY (3); (United States) Kylie Strom, ORL	(United States) Kerry Abello, ORL; (United States) Sam Coffey, POR (2); (United States) Lo'eau LaBonta, KC	(United States) Messiah Bright, ORL; (United States) Kristen Hamilton, KC (2); (United States) Morgan Weaver, POR	
September/ October	(United States) Jane Campbell, HOU	(United States) Caprice Dydasco, HOU; (United States) Naomi Girma, SD (2); (United States) Sarah Gorden, LA (2); (United States) M.A. Vignola, LA (2)	(United States) Sam Coffey, POR (3); (Brazil) Debinha, KC (3); (United States) Savannah McCaskill, LA (3)	(Spain) Esther González, NJY; (Brazil) Kerolin, NCC (2); (United States) Jaedyn Shaw, SD	

=== 2024 ===
Month	Goalkeeper	Defenders	Midfielders	Forwards	Ref.
March/April	(United States) Alyssa Naeher, CHI	(United States) Malia Berkely, NC; (United States) Naomi Girma, SD; (United States) Casey Krueger, WAS; (United States) Sam Staab, CHI	(United States) Croix Bethune, WAS; (United States) Vanessa DiBernardo, KC; (United States) Taylor Flint, LOU	(Malawi) Temwa Chawinga, KC; (United States) Sophia Smith, POR; (Brazil) Bia Zaneratto, KC	
May	(Germany) Ann-Katrin Berger, NJY	(United States) Jenna Nighswonger, NJY; (United States) Carson Pickett, LOU; (United States) Emily Sams, ORL; (United States) Sam Staab, CHI; (2)	(United States) Croix Bethune, WAS (2); (United States) Sam Coffey, POR; (United States) Savannah DeMelo, LOU	(Zambia) Barbra Banda, ORL; (France) Ouleymata Sarr, WAS; (United States) Sophia Smith, POR; (2)	
June	(England) Anna Moorhouse, ORL	(United States) Elizabeth Ball, KC; (United States) Casey Krueger, WAS (2); (United States) Jenna Nighswonger, NJY (2); (United States) Izzy Rodriguez, KC	(United States) Croix Bethune, WAS (3); (United States) Lo'eau LaBonta, KC; (United States) Rose Lavelle, NJY	(Zambia) Barbra Banda, ORL (2); (Malawi) Temwa Chawinga, KC (2); (United States) Mallory Swanson, CHI	
July	(United States) Cassie Miller, NJY	(United States) Kerry Abello, ORL; (United States) Madison Curry, LA; (United States) Sarah Gorden, LA; (United States) Meghan Klingenberg, POR	(Brazil) Debinha, KC; (United States) Lo'eau LaBonta, KC (2); (United States) Meredith Speck, NC	(United States) Kristen Hamilton, KC; (United States) Ashley Sanchez, NC; (United States) Ally Sentnor, UTA	
August	(Bosnia and Herzegovina) DiDi Haračić, LA	(United States) Kerry Abello, ORL (2); (United States) Abby Dahlkemper, BAY; (United States) Sarah Gorden, LA (2); (United States) Kylie Strom, ORL	(Brazil) Debinha, KC (2); (United States) Kayla Fischer, LOU; (United States) Lo'eau LaBonta, KC (3)	(Malawi) Temwa Chawinga, KC (3); (United States) Ella Stevens, NJY; (United States) Alyssa Thompson, LA	
September	(England) Anna Moorhouse, ORL (2)	(United States) Malia Berkely, NC (2); (United States) Abby Dahlkemper, BAY (2); (United States) Naomi Girma, SD (2); (United States) Emily Sams, ORL (2)	(United States) Lo'eau LaBonta, KC (4); (Brazil) Marta, ORL; (United States) Yazmeen Ryan, NJY	(Malawi) Temwa Chawinga, KC (4); (United States) Trinity Rodman, WAS; (United States) Alyssa Thompson, LA (2)	
October/ November	(Germany) Almuth Schult, KC	(United States) Abby Dahlkemper, BAY (3); (United States) Kaleigh Kurtz, NC; (United States) Emily Sams, ORL (3); (United States) Kayla Sharples, KC	(United States) Rose Lavelle, NJY (2); (United States) Yazmeen Ryan, NJY (2); (Spain) Claudia Zornoza, UTA	(Malawi) Temwa Chawinga, KC (5); (Spain) Esther González, NJY; (United States) Makenna Morris, WAS	

=== 2025 ===
Month	Goalkeeper	Defenders	Midfielders	Forwards	Ref.
March	(Brazil) Lorena, KC	(United States) Kerry Abello, ORL; (United States) Jordyn Bugg, SEA; (United States) Alana Cook, KC; (United States) Ryan Williams, NC	(Germany) Gia Corley, SD; (Brazil) Debinha, KC; (United States) Lo'eau LaBonta, KC	(Zambia) Barbra Banda, ORL; (Malawi) Temwa Chawinga, KC; (United States) Ashley Hatch, WAS	
April	(United States) Aubrey Kingsbury, WAS	(United States) Lilly Reale, GFC; (United States) Izzy Rodriguez, KC; (United States) Emily Sonnett, GFC; (United States) Ryan Williams, NC; (2)	(France) Kenza Dali, SD; (Brazil) Debinha, KC(2); (United States) Lo'eau LaBonta, KC; (2)	(Zambia) Barbra Banda, ORL (2); (France) Delphine Cascarino, SD; (Spain) Esther González, GFC	
May	(United States) Claudia Dickey, SEA	(United States) Trinity Armstrong, SD; (United States) Hailie Mace, KC; (United States) Casey Krueger, WAS; (United States) Gisele Thompson, LA	(United States) Sam Coffey, POR; (United States) Taylor Flint, LOU; (Japan) Manaka Matsukubo, NC	(Zambia) Barbra Banda, ORL (3); (Malawi) Temwa Chawinga, KC (2); (United States) Riley Tiernan, LA	
June	(Brazil) Lorena, KC (2)	(United States) Jordyn Bugg, SEA (2); (United States) Caprice Dydasco, BAY; (United States) Courtney Petersen, LOU; (United States) Kayla Sharples, KC	(United States) Sam Coffey, POR (2); (France) Kenza Dali, SD (2); (Japan) Manaka Matsukubo, NC (2)	(United States) Emeri Adames, SEA; (Malawi) Temwa Chawinga, KC (3); (Spain) Esther González, GFC (2)	
August	(United States) Jordyn Bloomer, LOU	(United States) Sofia Huerta, SEA; (United States) Izzy Rodriguez, KC (2); (United States) Kayla Sharples, KC (2); (United States) Sam Staab, CHI	(France) Kenza Dali, SD (3); (Wales) Jess Fishlock, SEA; (United States) Taylor Flint, LOU (2)	(Malawi) Temwa Chawinga, KC (4); (Spain) Esther González, GFC (3); (Brazil) Ludmila, CHI	
September	(United States) Aubrey Kingsbury, WAS (2)	(United States) Caprice Dydasco, BAY (2); (United States) Carson Pickett, ORL; (United States) Kayla Sharples, KC (3); (Denmark) Janni Thomsen, UTA	(United States) Croix Bethune, WAS; (France) Kenza Dali, SD (4); (United States) Rose Lavelle, GFC	(Malawi) Temwa Chawinga, KC (5); (United States) Paige Monaghan, UTA; (United States) Trinity Rodman, WAS	
October/November	(Australia) Mackenzie Arnold, POR	(United States) Sofia Huerta, SEA (2); (United States) Izzy Rodriguez, KC (3); (Canada) Janine Sonis, LOU; (United States) Sam Staab, CHI; (2)	(United States) Rose Lavelle, GFC (2); (Japan) Manaka Matsukubo, NC (3); (United States) Olivia Moultrie, POR	(Brazil) Dudinha, SD; (United States) Emma Sears, LOU; (Japan) Mina Tanaka, UTA	

=== 2026 ===
Month	Goalkeeper	Defenders	Midfielders	Forwards	Ref.
March	(United States) Abby Smith, DEN	(England) Jess Carter, GFC; (United States) Sofia Huerta, SEA; (United States) Gisele Thompson, LA; (United States) Kennedy Wesley, SD	(France) Kenza Dali, SD; (United States) Lia Godfrey, SD; (United States) Olivia Moultrie, POR	(Zambia) Barbra Banda, ORL; (Brazil) Dudinha, SD; (Iceland) Sveindís Jónsdóttir, LA	
April	(Scotland) Sandy MacIver, WAS	(United States) Sam Hiatt, POR; (England) Esme Morgan, WAS; (United States) Tara Rudd, WAS; (United States) Kennedy Wesley, SD (2)	(United States) Rose Lavelle, GFC; (United States) Ashley Sanchez, NC; (Colombia) Leicy Santos, WAS	(Zambia) Barbra Banda, ORL (2); (United States) Trinity Rodman, WAS; (Jamaica) Kiki van Zanten, HOU	
May	(United States) Mandy McGlynn, UTA	(Canada) Janine Sonis, DEN; (United States) Sam Hiatt, POR (2); (United States) Kate Del Fava, UTA; (United States) Tierna Davidson, GFC	(Japan) Manaka Matsukubo, NC; (United States) Kimmi Ascanio, SD; (United States) Croix Bethune, KC	(Malawi) Temwa Chawinga, KC; (Zambia) Barbra Banda, ORL (3); (Japan) Mina Tanaka, UTA	
July	(Scotland) Sandy MacIver, WAS (2)	(Norway) Guro Reiten, GFC; (United States) Tara Rudd, WAS (2); (United States) Kate Del Fava, UTA (2); (Canada) Janine Sonis, DEN (2)	(United States) Jaelin Howell, GFC; (United States) Croix Bethune, KC (2); (United States) Rose Lavelle, GFC (2)	(Sweden) Evelyn Ijeh, NC; (Spain) Esther González, GFC; (United States) Trinity Rodman, WAS (2)	
August	(Germany) Ann-Katrin Berger, GFC	(Canada) Janine Sonis, DEN (3); (United States) Tierna Davidson, GFC (2); (United States) Sarah Gorden, LA; (United States) Lauren Milliet, LOU	(United States) Croix Bethune, KC (3); (Japan) Mina Tanaka, UTA (2); (United States) Kat Rader, HOU	(United States) Ashley Sanchez, NC (2); (Sweden) Evelyn Ijeh, NC (2); (United States) Emma Sears, LOU	

== Multiple winners ==
**Bold**	Indicates current NWSL player

Rank	N.	Player	Club(s)	Wins
1	(Brazil)	**Debinha**	North Carolina Courage, **Kansas City Current**	15
1	(United States)	**Casey Krueger** (née Short)	Chicago Stars FC (Note: Chicago Stars FC was previously known as Chicago Red Stars.), **Washington Spirit**	15
3	(Malawi)	**Temwa Chawinga**	**Kansas City Current**	11
4	(United States)	**Lynn Biyendolo** (née Williams)	North Carolina Courage, Gotham FC (Note: Gotham FC was previously known as Sky Blue FC and NJ/NY Gotham FC.)	10
4	(New Zealand)	Abby Erceg	North Carolina Courage, Racing Louisville FC	10
4	(United States)	**Sofia Huerta**	Chicago Stars FC, Houston Dash, **Seattle Reign FC (Note: Seattle Reign FC was previously known as Reign FC and OL Reign.)**	10
4	(Australia)	**Sam Kerr**	Gotham FC, Chicago Stars FC	10
4	(United States)	**Lo'eau LaBonta**	Utah Royals FC, **Kansas City Current**	10
4	(United States)	**Rose Lavelle**	Washington Spirit, Seattle Reign FC, **Gotham FC**	10
4	(United States)	Becky Sauerbrunn	FC Kansas City, Utah Royals FC, Portland Thorns FC	10
11	(Wales)	**Jess Fishlock**	**Seattle Reign FC**	9
11	(United States)	Naomi Girma	San Diego Wave FC	9
11	(United States)	**Sam Staab**	Washington Spirit, **Chicago Stars FC**	9
14	(Zambia)	**Barbra Banda**	**Orlando Pride**	8
14	(United States)	Sam Coffey	Portland Thorns FC	8
14	(United States)	Crystal Dunn	North Carolina Courage, Portland Thorns FC	8
14	(United States)	**Caprice Dydasco**	Gotham FC, **Bay FC**	8
14	(United States)	**Carson Pickett**	North Carolina Courage, Racing Louisville FC	8
14	(United States)	Megan Rapinoe	Seattle Reign FC	8
20	(United States)	**Croix Bethune**	Washington Spirit, **Kansas City Current**	7
20	(United States)	**Sarah Gorden**	Chicago Stars FC, **Angel City FC**	7
20	(United States)	**Aubrey Kingsbury** (née Bledsoe)	**Washington Spirit**	7
20	(Brazil)	**Marta**	**Orlando Pride**	7
20	(United States)	**Mallory Swanson** (née Pugh)	Washington Spirit, **Chicago Stars FC**	7
25	(United States)	**Abby Dahlkemper**	North Carolina Courage, San Diego Wave FC, **Bay FC**	6
25	(Spain)	Esther González	Gotham FC	6
25	(United States)	**Ashley Hatch**	North Carolina Courage, **Washington Spirit**	6
25	(United States)	**Lindsey Heaps** (née Horan)	Portland Thorns FC	6
25	(United States)	**Trinity Rodman**	**Washington Spirit**	6
25	(United States)	**Sophia Wilson** (née Smith)	**Portland Thorns FC**	6
31	(France)	**Kenza Dali**	**San Diego Wave FC**	5
31	(England)	Rachel Daly	Houston Dash	5
31	(United States)	**Taylor Flint** (née Kornieck)	San Diego Wave FC, **Racing Louisville FC**	5
31	(United States)	Adrianna Franch	Portland Thorns FC, Kansas City Current	5
31	(United States)	Kristen Hamilton	North Carolina Courage, Kansas City Current	5
31	(United States)	Sam Mewis	North Carolina Courage	5
31	(Japan)	Yūki Nagasato	Chicago Stars FC	5
31	(United States)	**Jenna Nighswonger**	Gotham FC	5
31	(Canada)	**Kailen Sheridan**	Gotham FC	5
31	(Canada)	Christine Sinclair	Portland Thorns FC	5
31	(United States)	McCall Zerboni	North Carolina Courage	5
42	(United States)	**Kerry Abello**	**Orlando Pride**	4
42	(United States)	Jaelene Daniels (née Hinkle)	North Carolina Courage	4
42	(United States)	**Savannah DeMelo**	**Racing Louisville FC**	4
42	(United States)	**Vanessa DiBernardo**	Chicago Stars FC, **Kansas City Current**	4
42	(United States)	Morgan Gautrat (née Brian)	Chicago Stars FC	4
42	(Cameroon)	Estelle Johnson	Washington Spirit, Gotham FC	4
42	(United States)	Ali Krieger	Orlando Pride	4
42	(Japan)	Manaka Matsukubo	North Carolina Courage	4
42	(United States)	**Emily Menges**	Portland Thorns FC	4
42	(United States)	Alex Morgan	Orlando Pride, San Diego Wave FC	4
42	(United States)	**Izzy Rodriguez**	**Kansas City Current**	4
42	(United States)	**Kayla Sharples**	**Kansas City Current**	4
42	(Canada)	**Janine Sonis**	Racing Louisville FC, **Denver Summit FC**	4
42	(United States)	**Emily Sonnett**	Portland Thorns FC	4
56	(United States)	Bethany Balcer	Seattle Reign FC	3
56	(United States)	**Malia Berkely**	North Carolina Courage	3
56	(United States)	**Jane Campbell**	**Houston Dash**	3
56	(United States)	**Alana Cook**	Seattle Reign FC, **Kansas City Current**	3
56	(United States)	**Tierna Davidson**	Chicago Stars FC, **Gotham FC**	3
56	(United States)	Julie Ertz (née Johnston)	Chicago Stars FC	3
56	(United States)	Meghan Klingenberg	Portland Thorns FC	3
56	(United States)	**Hailie Mace**	Kansas City Current	3
56	(United States)	Merritt Mathias	North Carolina Courage	3
56	(United States)	**Kylie Nadaner** (née Strom)	**Orlando Pride**	3
56	(United States)	**Alyssa Naeher**	**Chicago Stars FC**	3
56	(United States)	Christen Press	Chicago Stars FC, Utah Royals FC	3
56	(United States)	**Midge Purce**	Portland Thorns FC, **Gotham FC**	3
56	(United States)	Amy Rodriguez	Utah Royals FC	3
56	(United States)	Angela Salem	Portland Thorns FC	3
56	(United States)	**Emily Sams** (née Madril)	Orlando Pride	3
56	(United States)	**Ashley Sanchez**	**North Carolina Courage**	3
56	(United States)	**Abby Smith**	Utah Royals FC, Gotham FC, **Denver Summit FC**	3
56	(Japan)	**Mina Tanaka**	**Utah Royals FC**	3
75	(United States)	**Elizabeth Ball**	**Kansas City Current**	2
75	(Germany)	**Ann-Katrin Berger**	**Gotham FC**	2
75	(United States)	**Bella Bixby**	**Portland Thorns FC**	2
75	(United States)	**Jordyn Bugg**	**Seattle Reign FC**	2
75	(Australia)	Steph Catley	Orlando Pride, Seattle Reign FC	2
75	(Scotland)	Rachel Corsie	Utah Royals FC	2
75	(United States)	**Paige Cronin** (née Monaghan)	Racing Louisville FC, **Utah Royals**	2
75	(United States)	**Kate Del Fava**	**Utah Royals**	2
75	(Brazil)	**Dudinha**	**San Diego Wave FC**	2
75	(Denmark)	Theresa Eslund (née Nielsen)	Seattle Reign FC	2
75	(United States)	Emily Fox	Racing Louisville FC, North Carolina Courage	2
75	(United States)	Tobin Heath	Portland Thorns FC	2
75	(United States)	**Sam Hiatt**	**Portland Thorns FC**	2
75	(Sweden)	**Evelyn Ijeh**	**North Carolina Courage**	2
75	(Brazil)	Kerolin	North Carolina Courage	2
75	(United States)	**Kaleigh Kurtz**	North Carolina Courage	2
75	(Canada)	Stephanie Labbé	Washington Spirit	2
75	(United States)	**Sydney Leroux**	Orlando Pride	2
75	(United States)	Katie Lind (née Naughton)	Chicago Stars FC, Houston Dash	2
75	(Brazil)	**Lorena**	**Kansas City Current**	2
75	(Scotland)	**Sandy MacIver**	**Washington Spirit**	2
75	(United States)	Megan Montefusco (née Oyster)	Seattle Reign FC	2
75	(England)	Anna Moorhouse	Orlando Pride	2
75	(United States)	**Olivia Moultrie**	**Portland Thorns FC**	2
75	(United States)	**Casey Murphy**	North Carolina Courage	2
75	(Nigeria)	Ifeoma Onumonu	Seattle Reign FC, Gotham FC	2
75	(United States)	**Courtney Petersen**	Orlando Pride, **Racing Louisville FC**	2
75	(United States)	**Yazmeen Ryan**	Gotham FC	2
75	(United States)	**Tara Rudd**	**Washington Spirit**	2
75	(England)	Emma Sears	Racing Louisville FC	2
75	(England)	Ebony Salmon	Houston Dash	2
75	(United States)	Taylor Smith	North Carolina Courage	2
75	(United States)	**Andi Sullivan**	**Washington Spirit**	2
75	(United States)	Alyssa Thompson	Angel City FC	2
75	(United States)	**Gisele Thompson**	**Angel City FC**	2
75	(United States)	Phallon Tullis-Joyce	Seattle Reign FC	2
75	(United States)	Kealia Watt (née Ohai)	Houston Dash	2
75	(United States)	**Morgan Weaver**	**Portland Thorns FC**	2
75	(United States)	**Kennedy Wesley**	**San Diego Wave FC**	2
75	(United States)	**Ryan Williams**	**North Carolina Courage**	2

== See also ==
- List of sports awards honoring women
- NWSL Player of the Week
- NWSL Rookie of the Month
- NWSL Player of the Month
- NWSL awards
- NWSL records and statistics
- Women's soccer in the United States
