= 2019 Chinese Women's Football League =

Chinese Women's Football League
- Season: 2019
- Champions: Shandong Sports Lottery
- Promoted: Shandong Sports Lottery; Zhejiang
- Relegated: Donghua University

The 2019 Chinese Women's Football League season was the league's 5th season in its current incarnation.

The season started on 29 June and concluded on 26 October. The number of the teams were expanded from 7 to 10.

== Clubs ==
=== Club changes ===
==== From Super League ====
Teams relegated from 2018 Chinese Women's Super League

- Hebei China Fortune

==== To Super League ====
Teams promoted to 2019 Chinese Women's Super League

- Meizhou Huijun

==== New teams ====
- Chongqing Lander
- Donghua University
- Hebei Aoli Jingying

=== Stadiums and Locations ===
Team	Head coach	City	Stadium	Capacity	2018 season
Hebei China Fortune	(China) Jiao Yuying	Shijiazhuang	Yutong International Sports Center	29,000	
Zhejiang	(China) Gao Rongming	Hangzhou			2nd
Shandong Sports Lottery	(China) Tang Xiaocheng	Jinan	Shandong Provincial Stadium	43,700	3rd
Sichuan	(China) Yang Zhe	Jiangyou	Jiangyou Sports Center		4th
Shaanxi Daqing Spring	(Spain) Carlos Bona	Xianyang	Xianyang Olympic Sports Center		5th
PLA	(China) Zhao Zhengchun	Nanchang	Jiangxi Olympic Sports Center	50,000	6th
Yunnan Jiashijing	(China) Gao Fulin	Kunming			7th
Chongqing Lander	(China) Lu Yiliang	Chongqing			
Donghua University	(China) Gao Yan	Shanghai			
Hebei Aoli Jingying	(China) Sui Mingyun	Tangshan			

== League table ==
Pos	Team	Pld	W	D	L	GF	GA	GD	Pts	Qualification or relegation
1	Shandong Sports Lottery (C, P)	18	14	4	0	44	5	+39	46	Women's Super League
2	Zhejiang (P)	18	8	8	2	27	18	+9	32	Women's Super League
3	Hebei China Fortune (Q)	18	10	2	6	36	16	+20	32	Promotion Play-offs
4	PLA	18	10	1	7	19	18	+1	31	
5	Sichuan	18	7	7	4	17	13	+4	28	
6	Shaanxi Daqing Spring	18	6	5	7	22	19	+3	23	
7	Yunnan Jiashijing	18	6	4	8	29	35	−6	22	
8	Hebei Aoli Jingying	18	6	3	9	21	28	−7	21	
9	Chongqing Lander	18	4	4	10	20	36	−16	16	
10	Donghua University (R)	18	0	0	18	8	55	−47	0	Qualification to Relegation play-offs

Source: China Football Association
Rules for classification: 1) Points; 2) Head-to-head points; 3) Head-to-head goal difference; 4) Head-to-head goals scored; 5) Goal difference; 6) Goals scored; 7) Disciplinary points (1 point for each yellow card, 3 points for each red card); 8) Reserve league points; 9) Draw
(C) Champions; (P) Promoted; (Q) Qualified for the phase indicated; (R) Relegated

== Relegation play-offs ==
9 November 2019
15:00 UTC+8

Donghua University	0–1	Dalian Yifang

Shanghai University Student Stadium, Songjiang, Shanghai
Referee: Mi Siyu
