= 2018 Chinese Women's Super League =

Chinese Women's Super League
- Season: 2018
- Champions: Dalian Quanjian (6th title)
- Relegated: Hebei China Fortune
- Top goalscorer: Tabitha Chawinga (17 goals)

The 2018 Chinese Women's Super League season was the league's 4th season in its current incarnation, and the 22nd total season of the women's association football league in China.

Dalian Quanjian were the defending champions.

== Clubs ==
=== Club changes ===
==== From League One ====
Teams promoted from 2017 Chinese Women's Football League

- Wuhan Jianghan University
- Henan Huishang

==== To League One ====
Teams relegated to 2018 Chinese Women's Football League

- Shandong Sports Lottery

==== Team withdrawal ====
- Tianjin Huisen

=== Stadiums and Locations ===
Team	Head coach	City	Stadium	Capacity	2017 season
Dalian Quanjian	(France) Farid Benstiti	Dalian	Dalian Sports Center Stadium	61,000	1st
Changchun Dazhong Zhuoyue		Changchun	Development Area Stadium	25,000	2nd
Jiangsu Suning		Nanjing	Wutaishan Stadium	18,500	3rd
Shanghai		Shanghai	Stadium of Baoshan Campus, Shanghai University	N/A	4th
Beijing BG Phoenix		Beijing	Xiannongtan Stadium	30,000	6th
Hebei China Fortune		Qinhuangdao	Qinhuangdao Olympic Sports Center Stadium	33,572	7th
Wuhan Jianghan University		Wuhan	Tazi Lake Sports Centre	N/A	League One, 1st
Henan Huishang		Luoyang	Luoyang Stadium	39,888	League One, 2nd

== Foreign players ==
Team	Player 1	Player 2	Player 3	Former Player^{1}
Beijing BG Phoenix	(Spain) Verónica Boquete			
Changchun Dazhong Zhuoyue	(Brazil) Cristiane	(Brazil) Rafaelle		
Dalian Quanjian	(Argentina) Sole Jaimes	(Nigeria) Asisat Oshoala		
Hebei China Fortune				
Henan Huishang	(Nigeria) Onome Ebi			
Jiangsu Suning	(Costa Rica) Shirley Cruz	(Malawi) Tabitha Chawinga		
Shanghai				
Wuhan Jianghan University	(Brazil) Byanca			

- ^1 Foreign players who left their clubs or were sent to reserve teams during the season.

== League table ==
Pos	Team	Pld	W	D	L	GF	GA	GD	Pts	Qualification or relegation
1	Dalian Quanjian (C)	14	11	2	1	45	13	+32	35	Champions
2	Jiangsu Suning	14	9	4	1	41	9	+32	31	
3	Changchun Dazhong Zhuoyue	14	8	4	2	31	16	+15	28	
4	Wuhan Jianghan University	14	7	0	7	30	26	+4	21	
5	Shanghai	14	6	2	6	25	16	+9	20	
6	Beijing BG Phoenix	14	4	3	7	19	20	−1	15	
7	Henan Huishang	14	2	3	9	14	35	−21	9	
8	Hebei China Fortune (R)	14	0	0	14	4	74	−70	0	Relegation to Chinese Women's League One

Source: China Football Association
Rules for classification: 1) Points; 2) Head-to-head points; 3) Head-to-head goal difference; 4) Head-to-head goals scored; 5) Goal difference; 6) Goals scored; 7) Disciplinary points (1 point for each yellow card, 3 points for each red card); 8) Reserve league points; 9) Draw
(C) Champions; (R) Relegated

== Goalscorers ==
Source: China Women's Football - 中国女足

Rank	Player	Club	Goals
1	(Malawi) Tabitha Chawinga	Jiangsu Suning	17
2	(Nigeria) Asisat Oshoala	Dalian Quanjian	10
2	(Brazil) Byanca	Wuhan Jianghan University F.C.	10
3	(Brazil) Giovanna	Changchun Dazhong Zhuoyue	8
3	(Argentina) Sole Jaimes	Dalian Quanjian	8
3	(China) Ren Guixin	Changchun Dazhong Zhuoyue	8
