= 2020 Chinese Women's Super League =

Professional football season

Chinese Women's Super League
- Season: 2020
- Dates: 23 August – 11 October 2020
- Champions: Wuhan Jianghan University (1st title)
- Relegated: Hebei China Fortune
- Top goalscorer: Barbra Banda (18 goals)
- Longest winning run: 6 matches Shanghai Shengli
- Longest unbeaten run: 10 matches Wuhan Jianghan University
- Longest winless run: 14 matches Hebei China Fortune
- Longest losing run: 14 matches Hebei China Fortune

The 2020 Chinese Women's Super League, officially known as the 2020 China Taiping Chinese Football Association Women's Super League (Chinese: 2020中国太平中国足球协会女子超级联赛) for sponsorship reasons, was the 6th season in its current incarnation, and the 24th total season of the women's association football league in China. The number of the teams was expanded to 10 in this season. All matches were held at Yunnan Haigeng Football Base. The season was split into two stages. The first stage started on 23 August and concluded on 18 September 2020. The second stage started on 27 September and concluded on 11 October 2020.

== Clubs ==
=== Club changes ===
Clubs promoted from 2019 Chinese Women's League One

- Hebei China Fortune
- Shandong Sports Lottery
- Zhejiang

Dissolved entries

- Dalian

==== Name changes ====
- Henan Huishang F.F.C. was acquired by men's football club Henan Jianye as their women's football section and changed their name to Henan Jianye W.F.C. in April 2020.

=== Stadiums and locations ===
Team	Head coach	City	Stadium	Capacity	2019 season
Beijing BG Phoenix	(China) Yu Yun	Beijing	Xiannongtan Stadium	30,000	5th
Changchun Dazhong Zhuoyue	(China) Liu You	Changchun	Development Area Stadium	25,000	3rd
Hebei China Fortune	(China) Jiao Yuying	Shijiazhuang	Yutong International Sports Center	29,000	CWFL, 3rd
Henan Jianye	(China) Lou Jiahui	Zhengzhou	Henan Provincial Stadium	48,000	7th
Jiangsu Suning	(France) Jocelyn Prêcheur	Nanjing	Wutaishan Stadium	22,000	1st
Meizhou Huijun	(China) He Weiwen	Meizhou	Huitang Stadium	30,000	6th
Shandong Sports Lottery	(China) Tang Xiaocheng	Jinan	Shandong Provincial Stadium	43,700	CWFL, 1st
Shanghai Shengli	(China) Shui Qingxia	Shanghai	Stadium of Baoshan Campus, Shanghai University	N/A	2nd
Wuhan Jianghan University	(China) Liu Lin	Wuhan	Tazihu Football Training Centre	2,000	4th
Zhejiang	(China) Gao Rongming	Hangzhou			CWFL, 2nd

Location of teams in 2020 Chinese Women's Super League

== Foreign players ==
Clubs can register a total of four foreign players (excluding goalkeepers) over the course of the season, but the number of foreign players allowed on each team at any given time is limited to three. A maximum of two foreign players can be fielded at any given time in each match.

Team	Player 1	Player 2	Player 3	Former players
Beijing BG Phoenix				
Changchun Dazhong Zhuoyue	(Argentina) Sole Jaimes	(Brazil) Rafaelle Souza		
Hebei China Fortune				
Henan Jianye				
Jiangsu Suning	(Ghana) Elizabeth Addo	(Malawi) Tabitha Chawinga		
Meizhou Huijun				
Shandong Sports Lottery				
Shanghai Shengli	(Brazil) Camila	(Nigeria) Francisca Ordega	(Zambia) Barbra Banda	
Wuhan Jianghan University	(Brazil) Beatriz	(Brazil) Millene	(Malawi) Temwa Chawinga	
Zhejiang				

== Regular season ==
=== League table ===
Pos	Team	Pld	W	D	L	GF	GA	GD	Pts	Qualification or relegation
1	Wuhan Jianghan University	9	8	1	0	28	3	+25	25	Qualification for Championship stage
2	Shanghai Shengli	9	8	0	1	31	6	+25	24	Qualification for Championship stage
3	Beijing BG Phoenix	9	6	0	3	21	9	+12	18 (Note: Head-to-head results: Jiangsu Suning 1–2 Beijing BG Phoenix)	Qualification for Championship stage
4	Jiangsu Suning	9	6	0	3	24	12	+12	18	Qualification for Championship stage
5	Changchun Dazhong Zhuoyue	9	5	2	2	23	10	+13	17	Qualification for Relegation stage
6	Shandong Sports Lottery	9	3	2	4	9	15	−6	11	Qualification for Relegation stage
7	Meizhou Huijun	9	2	2	5	10	18	−8	8	Qualification for Relegation stage
8	Zhejiang	9	1	2	6	4	26	−22	5	Qualification for Relegation stage
9	Henan Jianye	9	1	1	7	5	19	−14	4	Qualification for Relegation stage
10	Hebei China Fortune	9	0	0	9	4	41	−37	0	Qualification for Relegation stage

Source: Official Website (Desktop view), Official Website (Mobile view)
Rules for classification: 1) Points; 2) Head-to-head points; 3) Head-to-head goal difference; 4) Head-to-head goals scored; 5) Goal difference; 6) Goals scored; 7) Disciplinary points (yellow card = 1 point, red card as a result of two yellow cards = 3 points, direct red card = 3 points, yellow card followed by direct red card = 4 points); 8) Drawing of lots.

=== Results ===
Home \ Away	BG	CCD	HBC	HN	JSS	MZH	SDS	SHS	WHJ	ZJ
Beijing BG Phoenix		1–2	8–1			2–0	2–0			
Changchun Dazhong Zhuoyue			8–0			2–0	2–2		1–1	
Hebei China Fortune						0–5	1–2	0–7	0–5	
Henan Jianye	0–1	0–3	2–0		0–5		0–1			
Jiangsu Suning	1–2	2–0	3–2					0–3	0–3	
Meizhou Huijun				3–2	0–4			0–1	0–5	2–2
Shandong Sports Lottery					1–4	0–0			1–3	1–0
Shanghai Shengli	4–1	4–1		4–0			3–1			5–0
Wuhan Jianghan University	1–0			2–1				3–0		5–0
Zhejiang	0–4	0–4	1–0	0–0	1–5					

Source: Official Website (Desktop view), Official Website (Mobile view)
Legend: Blue = home team win; Yellow = draw; Red = away team win.
For upcoming matches, an "a" indicates there is an article about the rivalry between the two participants.

=== Positions by round ===
To preserve chronological evolvements, any postponed matches are not included to the round at which they were originally scheduled, but added to the full round they were played immediately afterwards. For example, if a match is scheduled for round 7, but then played between rounds 8 and 9, it will be added to the standings for round 8.

Team ╲ Round	1	2	3	4	5	6	7	8	9
Wuhan Jianghan University	4	3	2	2	2	2	1	1	1
Shanghai Shengli	1	1	1	1	1	1	2	2	2
Beijing BG Phoenix	2	4	3	6	4	5	4	4	3
Jiangsu Suning	3	2	4	3	5	3	3	3	4
Changchun Dazhong Zhuoyue	5	7	6	5	3	4	5	5	5
Shandong Sports Lottery	6	5	5	4	6	6	6	6	6
Meizhou Huijun	9	6	8	8	7	7	7	7	7
Zhejiang	10	10	10	10	10	9	9	9	8
Henan Jianye	8	9	7	7	8	8	8	8	9
Hebei China Fortune	7	8	9	9	9	10	10	10	10

Qualification to Championship stage
Qualification to Relegation stage

Source: Official Website (Desktop view), Official Website (Mobile view)

=== Results by match played ===
Team ╲ Round	1	2	3	4	5	6	7	8	9
Beijing BG Phoenix	W	W	L	L	W	L	W	W	W
Changchun Dazhong Zhuoyue	D	L	W	W	W	D	L	W	W
Hebei China Fortune	L	L	L	L	L	L	L	L	L
Henan Jianye	L	L	W	L	L	D	L	L	L
Jiangsu Suning	W	W	L	W	L	W	W	W	L
Meizhou Huijun	L	D	L	L	W	W	D	L	L
Shandong Sports Lottery	D	D	W	W	L	L	W	L	L
Shanghai Shengli	W	W	W	W	W	W	L	W	W
Wuhan Jianghan University	W	W	W	W	W	D	W	W	W
Zhejiang	L	L	L	L	L	D	D	L	W

Source: Official Website (Desktop view), Official Website (Mobile view)
W = Win; D = Draw; L = Loss

== Championship stage ==
=== League table ===
Pos	Team	Pld	W	D	L	GF	GA	GD	Pts	Qualification or relegation
1	Wuhan Jianghan University	3	2	0	1	8	4	+4	6 (Note: Head-to-head results: Wuhan Jianghan University 1–0 Jiangsu Suning)	Qualification for Championship playoffs
2	Jiangsu Suning	3	2	0	1	2	1	+1	6	Qualification for Championship playoffs
3	Shanghai Shengli	3	1	1	1	6	6	0	4	Qualification for Third place playoffs
4	Beijing BG Phoenix	3	0	1	2	2	7	−5	1	Qualification for Third place playoffs

Source: Official Website (Desktop view), Official Website (Mobile view)
Rules for classification: 1) Points; 2) Head-to-head points; 3) Head-to-head goal difference; 4) Head-to-head goals scored; 5) Goal difference; 6) Goals scored; 7) Disciplinary points (yellow card = 1 point, red card as a result of two yellow cards = 3 points, direct red card = 3 points, yellow card followed by direct red card = 4 points); 8) Drawing of lots.

=== Results ===
Home \ Away	BG	JSS	SHS	WHJ
Beijing BG Phoenix				0–4
Jiangsu Suning	1–0			
Shanghai Shengli	2–2	0–1		
Wuhan Jianghan University		1–0	3–4	

Source: Official Website (Desktop view), Official Website (Mobile view)
Legend: Blue = home team win; Yellow = draw; Red = away team win.
For upcoming matches, an "a" indicates there is an article about the rivalry between the two participants.

=== Positions by round ===
To preserve chronological evolvements, any postponed matches are not included to the round at which they were originally scheduled, but added to the full round they were played immediately afterwards. For example, if a match is scheduled for round 7, but then played between rounds 8 and 9, it will be added to the standings for round 8.

Team ╲ Round	1	2	3
Wuhan Jianghan University	1	2	1
Jiangsu Suning	4	3	2
Shanghai Shengli	3	1	3
Beijing BG Phoenix	2	4	4

Qualification to Championship playoffs
Qualification to Third place playoffs

Source: Official Website (Desktop view), Official Website (Mobile view)

=== Results by match played ===
Team ╲ Round	1	2	3
Beijing BG Phoenix	D	L	L
Jiangsu Suning	L	W	W
Shanghai Shengli	D	W	L
Wuhan Jianghan University	W	L	W

Source: Official Website (Desktop view), Official Website (Mobile view)
W = Win; D = Draw; L = Loss

== Relegation stage ==
=== League table ===
Pos	Team	Pld	W	D	L	GF	GA	GD	Pts	Qualification or relegation
1	Changchun Dazhong Zhuoyue	5	4	1	0	14	3	+11	13	
2	Meizhou Huijun	5	3	2	0	12	5	+7	11	
3	Shandong Sports Lottery	5	3	0	2	14	6	+8	9	
4	Henan Jianye	5	2	1	2	8	5	+3	7	
5	Zhejiang	5	1	0	4	2	16	−14	3	
6	Hebei China Fortune (R)	5	0	0	5	0	15	−15	0	Relegation to CWFL

Source: Official Website (Desktop view), Official Website (Mobile view)
Rules for classification: 1) Points; 2) Head-to-head points; 3) Head-to-head goal difference; 4) Head-to-head goals scored; 5) Goal difference; 6) Goals scored; 7) Disciplinary points (yellow card = 1 point, red card as a result of two yellow cards = 3 points, direct red card = 3 points, yellow card followed by direct red card = 4 points); 8) Drawing of lots.
(R) Relegated

=== Results ===
Home \ Away	CCD	HBC	HN	MZH	SDS	ZJ
Changchun Dazhong Zhuoyue		2–0			3–1	5–0
Hebei China Fortune			0–3			0–1
Henan Jianye	0–2			1–1		
Meizhou Huijun	2–2	4–0				3–1
Shandong Sports Lottery		5–0	2–1	1–2		
Zhejiang			0–3		0–5	

Source: Official Website (Desktop view), Official Website (Mobile view)
Legend: Blue = home team win; Yellow = draw; Red = away team win.
For upcoming matches, an "a" indicates there is an article about the rivalry between the two participants.

=== Positions by round ===
To preserve chronological evolvements, any postponed matches are not included to the round at which they were originally scheduled, but added to the full round they were played immediately afterwards. For example, if a match is scheduled for round 7, but then played between rounds 8 and 9, it will be added to the standings for round 8.

Team ╲ Round	1	2	3	4	5
Changchun Dazhong Zhuoyue	2	1	1	1	1
Meizhou Huijun	1	2	3	2	2
Shandong Sports Lottery	3	3	2	4	3
Henan Jianye	4	5	4	3	4
Zhejiang	5	4	5	5	5
Hebei China Fortune	6	6	6	6	6

Relegation to CWFL

Source: Official Website (Desktop view), Official Website (Mobile view)

=== Results by match played ===
Team ╲ Round	1	2	3	4	5
Changchun Dazhong Zhuoyue	W	W	D	W	W
Hebei China Fortune	L	L	L	L	L
Henan Jianye	L	D	W	W	L
Meizhou Huijun	W	D	D	W	W
Shandong Sports Lottery	W	L	W	L	W
Zhejiang	L	W	L	L	L

Source: Official Website (Desktop view), Official Website (Mobile view)
W = Win; D = Draw; L = Loss

== Championship playoffs ==
11 October 2020
16:00 UTC+8

Wuhan Jianghan University	4–0	Jiangsu Suning
	Report (Desktop view); Report (Mobile view)

Kunming
Attendance: 0
Referee: Qin Liang

== Third place playoffs ==
11 October 2020
15:00 UTC+8

Shanghai Shengli	3–1	Beijing BG Phoenix
	Report (Desktop view); Report (Mobile view)

Kunming
Attendance: 0
Referee: Zhang Lei

== Goalscorers ==
=== Top scorers ===
Source: China Women's Football - 中国女足

Rank	Player	Club	Goals
1	(Zambia) Barbra Banda	Shanghai Shengli	18
2	(Malawi) Temwa Chawinga	Wuhan Jianghan University F.C.	9
3	(China) Ma Xiaoxu	Beijing BG Phoenix	8
4	(Brazil) Bia	Wuhan Jianghan University F.C.	7
4	(Malawi) Tabitha Chawinga	Jiangsu Suning	7
4	(China) Tang Jiali	Shanghai Shengli	7
5	(China) Ni Mengjie	Jiangsu Suning	6
