= Wuhan Jianghan University F.C. =

Wuhan Jianghan University
- Founded: 2001; 25 years ago
- Ground: Wuhan Hehe Football Stadium
- Capacity: 8,000
- Manager: Liu Lin
- League: CWSL
- 2025: Chinese Women's Super League, 5th of 12
Home colours	Away colours

Wuhan Jianghan University Football Club (Chinese: 武汉江汉大学足球俱乐部, pinyin: Wǔhàn Jiānghàn Dàxué Zúqiú Jùlèbù), also known as Wuhan Jiangda (武汉江大), is a Chinese professional football club located in Wuhan. They compete in the Chinese Women's Super League, and their home stadium is Wuhan Hehe Football Stadium.

== History ==
Wuhan Jianghan University F.C. was founded in 2001 as a cooperation between Jianghan University and the Wuhan football association.

In 2017, the team won the first honour in its history, winning the 2017 China Women's League One title to achieve promotion to the China Women's Super League for the first time in its history. In the 2018 China Women's Super League season, they finished fourth.

During the 2019 FIFA Women's World Cup, five of their players were selected to compete for the China women's national football team. Following the tournament, they re-signed former player Wang Shuang after a season at Paris Saint-Germain ahead of the 2019 China Women's Super League campaign.

== Current squad ==
As of 24 May 2025 for 2025 AFC Women's Champions League final

Note: Flags indicate national team as defined under FIFA eligibility rules; some limited exceptions apply. Players may hold more than one non-FIFA nationality.

No.	Pos.	Nation	Player
5	DF	CHN	Wu Haiyan
6	MF	CHN	Xie Ting
7	MF	CHN	Wang Shuang
8	MF	CHN	Li Tingting
9	MF	MLI	Saratou Traoré
10	MF	CHN	Yao Wei
12	FW	CHN	Tang Han
13	DF	CHN	Xu Qianqian
18	MF	CHN	Ma Jun
21	MF	CHN	Dai Chenying
22	GK	CHN	Chen Chen
26	MF	CHN	Jiang Chenjing

No.	Pos.	Nation	Player
27	FW	CHN	Deng Mengye
28	DF	CHN	Song Fei
29	GK	CHN	Ding Xuan
30	MF	CHN	Wang Qianqian
32	DF	CHN	Zhao Yuxin
33	FW	KEN	Terry Engesha
36	FW	CHN	Zhao Jingyi
37	MF	CHN	Song Duan
46	DF	CHN	Huang Baoying
47	MF	CHN	Du Jianqun
90	DF	KOR	Kim Hye-ri

== Honours ==
=== League ===
- Chinese Women's Super League

Champions (5): 2020, 2021, 2022, 2023, 2024

- Chinese Women's League One

Champions (1): 2017

=== International ===
- AFC Women's Champions League
  - Champions (1): 2024–25

== International record ==
Season	Competition	Round	Opponent	Score	Result
2024–25	AFC Champions League	Group A	(United Arab Emirates) Abu Dhabi SC	1–2	3rd
2024–25	AFC Champions League	Group A	(Malaysia) Sabah	7–0	3rd
2024–25	AFC Champions League	Group A	(South Korea) Incheon Red Angels	0–2	3rd
2024–25	AFC Champions League	Quarter-finals	(Japan) Urawa Red Diamonds	0–0 (a.e.t.) (6–5 p)	
2024–25	AFC Champions League	Semi-finals	(Vietnam) Hồ Chí Minh City	2–0	
2024–25	AFC Champions League	Final	(Australia) Melbourne City	1–1 (a.e.t.) (5–4 p)	
2025–26	FIFA Champions Cup	Round 1	(New Zealand) Auckland United	1–0	
2025–26	FIFA Champions Cup	Round 2	(Morocco) AS FAR	1–2	
2025–26	AFC Champions League	Group stage	(Uzbekistan) Nasaf	1–1	1st
2025–26	AFC Champions League	Group stage	(India) East Bengal	2–0	1st
2025–26	AFC Champions League	Group stage	(Iran) Bam Khatoon	4–0	1st
2025–26	AFC Champions League	Quarter-finals	(South Korea) Suwon	0–4	
