= Chinese Women's Super League =

Top women's football league in China

Chinese Women's Super League (CWSL)
- Founded: 1997; 29 years ago
- Country: China
- Confederation: Asian Football Confederation
- Number of clubs: 12
- Level on pyramid: 1
- Relegation to: Chinese Women's League One
- Domestic cup(s): Chinese Women's FA Cup; Chinese Women's Super Cup
- International cup: AFC Women's Champions League
- Current champions: Beijing (3 titles) (2025)
- Most championships: Shanghai Shengli (11 titles)
- Website: http://women.thecfa.cn/
- Current: 2026 Chinese Women's Super League

The Chinese Football Association Women's Super League (CWSL) (Chinese: 中国女足超级联赛; pinyin: zhōngguónǚzú chāojí liánsài), commonly known as the Chinese Women's Super League or the CWSL is the top level women's football league in China. It was called the Chinese Women's National Football League from 2011 to 2014.

== History ==
The league started in 1997 as the Chinese Women's Premier Football League. The name Women's Super League was first adopted in 2004. During the 2011 to 2014 seasons, the league was renamed to Women's National Football League and discontinued the practice of promotion and relegation due to a lack of available teams and playing talent.

In 2015, the Chinese Football Association relaunched the league, again as the Women's Super League and with an affiliated second division, CWFL. It also gained a title sponsor, LeTV Holdings Co Ltd. The league signed a five-year deal with Spanish apparel company Kelme to provide uniforms.

Investment in women's clubs accelerated after the 2016 season with major corporate sponsors and investors, such as Quanjian Group and Guotai Junan Securities, raising player salaries and recruiting high-profile players from top-division leagues in Europe. This included Brazilian star Cristiane from Paris Saint-Germain to Changchun Zhuoyue, 2016 Toppserien golden boot winner Isabell Herlovsen from LSK Kvinner FK to Jiangsu Suning F.C., and Nigerian star Asisat Oshoala from Arsenal L.F.C. and Cameroonian star Gaelle Enganamouit from FC Rosengård to Dalian Quanjian F.C.

== Current clubs ==
Locations of teams in the 2026 Chinese Women's Super League

Club		Location	Stadium	Head coach
English name	Chinese name	Location	Stadium	Head coach
Beijing	北京东方雨虹	Beijing	Xiannongtan Stadium	(China) Yu Yun
Changchun Dazhong Zhuoyue	长春大众卓越	Changchun	Development Area Stadium	(China) Chan Hiu-Ming
Guangdong	广东省女足	Shenzhen	Shenzhen Youth Football Training Base	(China) Li Hui
Guangxi Pingguo	广西平果女足	Pingguo	Pingguo Stadium	(China) Zhao Yan
Jiangsu Wuxi	江苏无锡女足	Wuxi	Jiangyin Sports Centre	(Portugal) Miguel Santos
Liaoning Shenbei Hefeng	辽宁沈北禾丰女足	Shenyang	Shenyang City Sports Stadium	(China) Ma Lin
Shaanxi Zhidan	陕西志丹女足	Shaanxi	Shanxi Provincial Stadium	(China) Lu Yiliang
Shandong Jinghua	山东精花女足	Zaozhuang	Zaozhuang Sports and Cultural Park Stadium	(China) Li Xinqi
Shanghai	上海农商银行女足	Shanghai	Jinshan Sports Centre	(China) Ma Liangxing
Sichuan	四川女足	Mianyang	Santai Stadium	(China) Dongfeng Yu
Wuhan Jiangda	武汉车谷江大女足	Wuhan	Tazihu Football Training Centre	(China) Chang Weiwei
Zhejiang Hangzhou	浙江杭州银行女足	Hangzhou	Linping Sports Centre Stadium	(China) Li Wenjun

== Champions ==
The list of CWSL champions:

Year	Club
1997	Guangdong Haiyin
1998	Shanghai Yuandong
1999	Beijing Chengjian
2000	Shanghai STV Youlizi
2001	Shanghai STV
2002	Beijing Chengjian
2003	Shanghai STV
2004	Shanghai STV
2005	Shanghai STV
2006	Shanghai STV
2007	Tianjin Huisen
2008	Dalian Shide
2009	Jiangsu Huatai
2010	Shanghai STV
2011	Team Shanghai
2012	Dalian Shide
2013	Dalian Aerbin
2014	Team Shanghai
2015	Shanghai Guotai Jun'an
2016	Dalian Quanjian
2017	Dalian Quanjian
2018	Dalian Quanjian
2019	Jiangsu Suning
2020	Wuhan Jiangda
2021	Wuhan Jiangda
2022	Wuhan Jiangda
2023	Wuhan Jiangda
2024	Wuhan Jiangda
2025	Beijing
2026	Liaoning

=== Wins by club ===
Club	Championships	Years
Shanghai	11	1998, 2000, 2001, 2003, 2004, 2005, 2006, 2010, 2011, 2014, 2015
Dalian (defunct)	6	2008, 2012, 2013, 2016, 2017, 2018
Wuhan Jiangda	5	2020, 2021, 2022, 2023, 2024
Beijing	3	1999, 2002, 2025
Jiangsu	2	2009, 2019
Guangdong	1	1997
Tianjin	1	2007
Liaoning	1	2026

== See also ==
- Sport in China
  - Football in China
    - Women's football in China
- China women's national football team
