= 2021 in Chinese football =

Football in China
- Season: 2021

Men's football
- Super League: Shandong Taishan
- League One: Wuhan Three Towns
- League Two: Qingdao Hainiu
- CMCL: Jinan Xingzhou

Women's football
- Super League: Wuhan Jianghan University
- Football League: Shaanxi

The 2021 season was the 71st season of competitive association football in China.

== National teams ==
=== China national football team ===
==== Results and fixtures ====
===== 2022 FIFA World Cup qualification =====
====== Second round ======
Pos	Team	Pld	W	D	L	GF	GA	GD	Pts	Qualification	United Arab Republic	People's Republic of China	Philippines	Maldives	Guam
1	Syria	8	7	0	1	22	7	+15	21	World Cup qualifying third round and Asian Cup	—	2–1	1–0	2–1	4–0
2	China (Note: China qualified for the Asian Cup as the host nation. They withdrew as the host in May 2022.)	8	6	1	1	30	3	+27	19	World Cup qualifying third round and Asian Cup	3–1	—	2–0	5–0	7–0
3	Philippines	8	3	2	3	12	11	+1	11	Asian Cup qualifying third round	2–5	0–0	—	1–1	3–0
4	Maldives	8	2	1	5	7	20	−13	7	Asian Cup qualifying third round	0–4	0–5	1–2	—	3–1
5	Guam	8	0	0	8	2	32	−30	0	Asian Cup qualifying play-off round	0–3	0–7	1–4	0–1	—

Source: FIFA
Rules for classification: Qualification tiebreakers
Notes:

30 May 2021 FIFA World Cup qualification R2	Guam	0–7	China	Suzhou, China
19:30 UTC+8		Report (FIFA); Report (AFC)	Wu Lei 20' (pen.), 55'; Jin Jingdao 39'; Wu Xi 61'; Elkeson 65'; Alan 83', 87'	Stadium: Suzhou Olympic Sports Centre; Attendance: 29,222; Referee: Sivakorn Pu-udom (Thailand)

7 June 2021 FIFA World Cup qualification R2	China	2–0	Philippines	Sharjah, United Arab Emirates
21:00 UTC+4	Wu Lei 56' (pen.); Wu Xinghan 65'	Report (FIFA); Report (AFC)		Stadium: Sharjah Stadium; Attendance: 0 Referee: Kim Hee-gon (South Korea)

11 June 2021 FIFA World Cup qualification R2	China	5–0	Maldives	Sharjah, United Arab Emirates
21:00 UTC+4	Liu Binbin 5'; Wu Lei 30'; Alan 68'; Zhang Yuning 69'; Tan Long 79'	Report (FIFA); Report (AFC)		Stadium: Sharjah Stadium; Attendance: 0 Referee: Ahmed Al-Ali (Jordan)

15 June 2021 FIFA World Cup qualification R2	China	3–1	Syria	Sharjah, United Arab Emirates
22:00 UTC+4	Zhang Xizhe 43'; Wu Lei 69' (pen.); Zhang Yuning 90+3'	Report (FIFA); Report (AFC)	Aosman 50'	Stadium: Sharjah Stadium; Referee: Muhammad Taqi (Singapore)

====== Third round ======
Pos	Team	Pld	W	D	L	GF	GA	GD	Pts	Qualification	Saudi Arabia	Japan	Australia	Oman	People's Republic of China	Vietnam
1	Saudi Arabia	10	7	2	1	12	6	+6	23	2022 FIFA World Cup	—	1–0	1–0	1–0	3–2	3–1
2	Japan	10	7	1	2	12	4	+8	22	2022 FIFA World Cup	2–0	—	2–1	0–1	2–0	1–1
3	Australia	10	4	3	3	15	9	+6	15	Fourth round	0–0	0–2	—	3–1	3–0	4–0
4	Oman	10	4	2	4	11	10	+1	14		0–1	0–1	2–2	—	2–0	3–1
5	China	10	1	3	6	9	19	−10	6		1–1	0–1	1–1	1–1	—	3–2
6	Vietnam	10	1	1	8	8	19	−11	4		0–1	0–1	0–1	0–1	3–1	—

Source: FIFA, AFC
Rules for classification: Tiebreakers

2 September 2021 FIFA World Cup qualification R3	Australia	3–0	China	Doha, Qatar
21:00 UTC+3	Mabil 24'; Boyle 26'; Duke 70'	Report (FIFA)		Stadium: Khalifa International Stadium; Referee: Ko Hyung-jin (South Korea)

7 September 2021 FIFA World Cup qualification R3	China	0–1	Japan	Doha, Qatar
18:00 UTC+3		Report (FIFA)	Osako 40'	Stadium: Khalifa International Stadium; Attendance: 0 Referee: Nawaf Shukralla (Bahrain)

7 October 2021 FIFA World Cup qualification R3	China	3–2	Vietnam	Sharjah, United Arab Emirates
21:00 UTC+4	Zhang Yuning 57'; Wu Lei 75', 90+5'	Report (FIFA)	Hồ Tấn Tài 79'; Nguyễn Tiến Linh 90'	Stadium: Sharjah Stadium; Referee: Mohammed Abdulla Hassan Mohamed (United Arab Emirates)

12 October 2021 FIFA World Cup qualification R3	Saudi Arabia	3–2	China	Jeddah, Saudi Arabia
20:00 UTC+3	Al-Najei 15', 38'; Al-Buraikan 72'	Report (FIFA)	Aloísio 46'; Wu Xi 87'	Stadium: King Abdullah Sports City; Referee: Ilgiz Tantashev (Uzbekistan)

11 November 2021 FIFA World Cup qualification R3	China	1–1	Oman	Sharjah, United Arab Emirates
19:00 UTC+4	Wu Lei 21'	Report (FIFA)	Al-Harthi 75'	Stadium: Sharjah Stadium; Referee: Sivakorn Pu-udom (Thailand)

16 November 2021 FIFA World Cup qualification R3	China	1–1	Australia	Sharjah, United Arab Emirates
19:00 UTC+4	Wu Lei 71' (pen.)	Report (FIFA)	Duke 38'	Stadium: Sharjah Stadium; Referee: Adham Makhadmeh (Jordan)

===== Friendlies =====
30 September 2021 Friendly	China	1–1	Syria	Sharjah, United Arab Emirates
19:00 UTC+4	Zhang Yuning 45+2'		Marmour 26'	Stadium: Sharjah Stadium; Attendance: 0 (Behind closed door)

=== China women's national football team ===
==== Results and fixtures ====
===== Olympic qualifying tournament =====
Team 1	Agg.	Team 2	1st leg	2nd leg
South Korea	3–4	China	1–2	2–2 (a.e.t.)

8 April	South Korea	1–2	China	Goyang, South Korea
16:00 UTC+9	Kang Chae-rim 39'	Live Report (AFC); Stats Report (AFC); Report (KFA); Report (Soccerway)	Zhang Xin 33'; Wang Shuang 73' (pen.)	Stadium: Goyang Stadium; Attendance: 1,091; Referee: Casey Reibelt (Australia)

13 April	China	2–2 (a.e.t.)	South Korea	Suzhou, China
16:00 UTC+8	Wang Shuang 69', 104'	Live Report (AFC); Stats Report (AFC); Report (KFA); Report (Soccerway)	Kang Chae-rim 31'; Choe Yu-ri 45'	Stadium: Suzhou Olympic Sports Centre; Referee: Yoshimi Yamashita (Japan)

===== Summer Olympics =====
Pos	Team	Pld	W	D	L	GF	GA	GD	Pts	Qualification
1	Netherlands	3	2	1	0	21	8	+13	7	Advance to knockout stage
2	Brazil	3	2	1	0	9	3	+6	7	Advance to knockout stage
3	Zambia	3	0	1	2	7	15	−8	1	
4	China	3	0	1	2	6	17	−11	1	

Source: TOCOG and FIFA
Rules for classification: Group stage tiebreakers

21 July 2021 Olympics	China	0–5	Brazil	Rifu, Japan
17:00 UTC+9		Report (Tokyo 2020); Report (FIFA)	Marta 9', 74'; Debinha 22'; Alves 82' (pen.); Beatriz 89'	Stadium: Miyagi Stadium; Attendance: 0 Referee: Kateryna Monzul (Ukraine)

24 July 2021 Olympics	China	4–4	Zambia	Rifu, Japan
17:00 UTC+9	Wang Shuang 6', 22', 23', 83' (pen.)	Report (Tokyo 2020); Report (FIFA)	Kundananji 15'; Banda 42' (pen.), 46', 69'	Stadium: Miyagi Stadium; Attendance: 0 Referee: Melissa Borjas (Honduras)

27 July 2021 Olympics	Netherlands	8–2	China	Yokohama, Japan
20:30 UTC+9	van de Sanden 12'; Beerensteyn 37', 45+2'; Martens 47', 70'; Miedema 65', 76'; Pelova 72'	Report (Tokyo 2020); Report (FIFA)	Wang Shanshan 28'; Wang Yanwen 69'	Stadium: International Stadium Yokohama; Attendance: 0 Referee: Salima Mukansanga (Rwanda)

== AFC competitions ==
=== AFC Champions League ===
==== AFC Champions League qualifying play-offs round ====
===== Play-off round =====
Team 1	Score	Team 2
Shanghai Port (China)	0–1	(Philippines) Kaya–Iloilo

==== Group stage ====
===== Group I =====
Pos	Team	Pld	W	D	L	GF	GA	GD	Pts	Qualification	KAW	DAE	UNI	BJG
1	(Japan) Kawasaki Frontale	6	6	0	0	27	3	+24	18	Advance to Round of 16	—	3–2	8–0	4–0
2	(South Korea) Daegu FC	6	4	0	2	22	6	+16	12	Advance to Round of 16	1–3	—	7–0	5–0
3	(Philippines) United City	6	1	1	4	4	24	−20	4		0–2	0–4	—	1–1
4	(China) Beijing Guoan	6	0	1	5	3	23	−20	1		0–7	0–3	2–3	—

Source: AFC
Rules for classification: Tiebreakers

===== Group J =====
Pos	Team	Pld	W	D	L	GF	GA	GD	Pts	Qualification	CER	KIT	POR	GZH
1	(Japan) Cerezo Osaka	6	4	2	0	13	2	+11	14	Advance to Round of 16	—	2–1	1–1	5–0
2	(Hong Kong) Kitchee	6	3	2	1	6	3	+3	11		0–0	—	2–0	1–0
3	(Thailand) Port (H)	6	2	2	2	10	8	+2	8		0–3	1–1	—	3–0
4	(China) Guangzhou	6	0	0	6	1	17	−16	0		0–2	0–1	1–5	—

Source: AFC
Rules for classification: Tiebreakers
(H) Hosts

== Men's football ==
League	Promoted to league	Relegated from league	Expelled or Dissolved	Re-elected
Super League	Changchun Yatai	None	Jiangsu	None
League One	Wuhan Three Towns; Zibo Cuju; Nanjing City; Beijing BIT	None	Beijing Renhe; Inner Mongolia Zhongyou; Taizhou Yuanda	None
League Two	Dongguan United; Xiamen Egret Island; Sichuan Minzu; Yichun Grand Tiger; Hebei Kungfu; Wuxi Wugou; Quanzhou Yassin; Yanbian Longding; Dandong Tengyue	None	Jiangsu Yancheng Dingli; Shenzhen Bogang	None

=== Super League ===
==== Regular season ====
===== Group A =====
Pos	Team	Pld	W	D	L	GF	GA	GD	Pts	Qualification or relegation
1	Shandong Taishan	14	10	3	1	30	10	+20	33	Qualification for Championship stage
2	Guangzhou	14	9	3	2	39	14	+25	30	Qualification for Championship stage
3	Shenzhen	14	7	3	4	24	18	+6	24	Qualification for Championship stage
4	Guangzhou City	14	5	6	3	21	21	0	21	Qualification for Championship stage
5	Henan Songshan Longmen	14	4	6	4	13	14	−1	18	Qualification for Relegation stage
6	Chongqing Liangjiang Athletic	14	3	2	9	16	28	−12	11	Qualification for Relegation stage
7	Cangzhou Mighty Lions	14	2	4	8	13	23	−10	10	Qualification for Relegation stage
8	Qingdao	14	2	1	11	6	34	−28	7	Qualification for Relegation stage

Source: CSL, Soccerway
Rules for classification:
- During season: 1) Points; 2) Goal difference; 3) Goals scored.
- After season: 1) Points; 2) Head-to-head points; 3) Head-to-head goal difference; 4) Head-to-head goals scored; 5) Scores of the weight ratio of the reserve league and youth leagues.

===== Group B =====
Pos	Team	Pld	W	D	L	GF	GA	GD	Pts	Qualification or relegation
1	Changchun Yatai	14	8	4	2	23	11	+12	28 (Note: Head-to-head results: Changchun Yatai 2–1 Shanghai Port, Shanghai Port 0–0 Changchun Yatai.)	Qualification for Championship stage
2	Shanghai Port	14	8	4	2	30	7	+23	28	Qualification for Championship stage
3	Beijing Guoan	14	7	3	4	19	16	+3	24	Qualification for Championship stage
4	Hebei	14	6	5	3	12	11	+1	23	Qualification for Championship stage
5	Shanghai Shenhua	14	6	4	4	21	17	+4	22	Qualification for Relegation stage
6	Wuhan	14	1	8	5	11	19	−8	11	Qualification for Relegation stage
7	Tianjin Jinmen Tiger	14	2	3	9	11	29	−18	9	Qualification for Relegation stage
8	Dalian Pro	14	2	1	11	12	29	−17	7	Qualification for Relegation stage

Source: CSL, Soccerway
Rules for classification:
- During season: 1) Points; 2) Goal difference; 3) Goals scored.
- After season: 1) Points; 2) Head-to-head points; 3) Head-to-head goal difference; 4) Head-to-head goals scored; 5) Scores of the weight ratio of the reserve league and youth leagues.
  Notes:

==== Championship stage ====
Pos	Team	Pld	W	D	L	GF	GA	GD	Pts	Qualification
1	Shandong Taishan (C)	22	15	6	1	47	16	+31	51	Qualification for AFC Champions League group stage
2	Shanghai Port	22	13	6	3	42	14	+28	45	Qualification for AFC Champions League group stage
3	Guangzhou	22	13	5	4	47	17	+30	44	Qualification for AFC Champions League group stage
4	Changchun Yatai	22	11	6	5	31	20	+11	39	
5	Beijing Guoan	22	9	6	7	26	28	−2	33	
6	Shenzhen	22	9	5	8	33	29	+4	32	
7	Guangzhou City	22	7	8	7	32	31	+1	29	
8	Hebei	22	6	7	9	15	28	−13	25	

Source: Soccerway
Rules for classification:
- During season: 1) Points; 2) Goal difference; 3) Goals scored.
- After season: 1) Points; 2) Head-to-head points; 3) Head-to-head goal difference; 4) Head-to-head goals scored; 5) Scores of the weight ratio of the reserve league and youth leagues.
  (C) Champions

==== Relegation stage ====
Pos	Team	Pld	W	D	L	GF	GA	GD	Pts	Qualification or relegation
9	Shanghai Shenhua	22	10	7	5	34	22	+12	37	
10	Henan Songshan Longmen	22	7	9	6	19	20	−1	30	
11	Cangzhou Mighty Lions	22	6	6	10	25	32	−7	24	
12	Tianjin Jinmen Tiger	22	5	6	11	18	35	−17	21	
13	Chongqing Liangjiang Athletic (R, D)	22	5	5	12	21	36	−15	20 (Note: Chongqing Liangjiang Athletic finished ahead of Wuhan on head-to-head points: Chongqing Liangjiang Athletic 0–0 Wuhan, Wuhan 1–2 Chongqing Liangjiang Athletic.)	Dissolved after season
14	Wuhan	22	3	11	8	23	30	−7	20	
15	Dalian Pro (T)	22	6	1	15	21	37	−16	19	Qualification for relegation play-offs
16	Qingdao (R, D)	22	3	2	17	13	52	−39	11	Dissolved after season

Source: Soccerway
Rules for classification:
- During season: 1) Points; 2) Goal difference; 3) Goals scored.
- After season: 1) Points; 2) Head-to-head points; 3) Head-to-head goal difference; 4) Head-to-head goals scored; 5) Scores of the weight ratio of the reserve league and youth leagues.
  (D) Disqualified; (R) Relegated; (T) Qualified, but not yet for the particular phase indicated
  Notes:

=== League One ===
Pos	Team	Pld	W	D	L	GF	GA	GD	Pts	Promotion, qualification or relegation
1	Wuhan Three Towns (C, P)	34	25	4	5	73	25	+48	79	Promotion to Super League
2	Meizhou Hakka (P)	34	24	3	7	79	35	+44	75	Promotion to Super League
3	Zhejiang (O, P)	34	22	8	4	69	28	+41	74	Qualification for Promotion play-offs
4	Chengdu Rongcheng (O, P)	34	21	8	5	81	28	+53	71	Qualification for Promotion play-offs
5	Nantong Zhiyun	34	20	5	9	62	30	+32	65	
6	Shaanxi Chang'an Athletic	34	17	11	6	55	30	+25	62	
7	Heilongjiang Ice City	34	15	11	8	50	40	+10	56	
8	Sichuan Jiuniu	34	13	13	8	34	27	+7	52	
9	Kunshan	34	13	12	9	56	35	+21	51	
10	Nanjing City	34	12	9	13	41	42	−1	45	
11	Zibo Cuju	34	10	9	15	32	52	−20	39 (Note: Zibo Cuju finished ahead of Guizhou on goal difference: Zibo Cuju 0–1 Guizhou, Guizhou 1–2 Zibo Cuju; Goal difference: Zibo Cuju -20 and Guizhou -30.)	
12	Guizhou (D)	34	10	9	15	26	56	−30	39	Dissolved after season
13	Suzhou Dongwu	34	7	11	16	36	53	−17	32	
14	Jiangxi Beidamen	34	7	8	19	29	68	−39	29	
15	Beijing BSU	34	6	10	18	37	53	−16	28	
16	Liaoning Shenyang Urban	34	7	4	23	30	62	−32	25	
17	Beijing BIT (T)	34	3	5	26	24	82	−58	14	Qualification for Relegation play-offs
18	Xinjiang Tianshan Leopard (T)	34	1	6	27	16	84	−68	9	Qualification for Relegation play-offs

Source: CFA
Rules for classification:
- During season: 1) Points; 2) Goal difference; 3) Goals scored
- After season: 1) Points; 2) Head-to-head points; 3) Head-to-head goal difference; 4) Head-to-head goals scored; 5) Goal difference; 6) Goals scored; 7) Disciplinary points (1 point for each yellow card, 3 points for each red card); 8) Draw
  (C) Champions; (D) Disqualified; (O) Play-off winners; (P) Promoted; (T) Qualified, but not yet for the particular phase indicated
  Notes:

=== League Two ===
==== First stage ====
===== Group A =====
Pos	Team	Pld	W	D	L	GF	GA	GD	Pts	Promotion, qualification or relegation
1	Shanxi Longjin	14	9	5	0	25	8	+17	32	Qualification for Promotion stage
2	Guangxi Pingguo Haliao	14	8	4	2	29	11	+18	28	Qualification for Promotion stage
3	Hebei Kungfu	14	8	2	4	18	10	+8	26	Qualification for Promotion stage
4	Xi'an Wolves	14	6	4	4	20	12	+8	22	Qualification for Relegation stage Group F
5	Shaoxing Keqiao Yuejia	14	5	3	6	14	16	−2	18	Qualification for Relegation stage Group F
6	Inner Mongolia Caoshangfei	14	4	1	9	16	20	−4	13 (Note: Head-to-head results: Inner Mongolia Caoshangfei 1–2 Dandong Tengyue, Dandong Tengyue 0–3 Inner Mongolia Caoshangfei.)	Qualification for Relegation stage Group F
7	Dandong Tengyue	14	3	4	7	12	29	−17	13	Qualification for Relegation stage Group E
8	Hubei Istar	14	1	1	12	3	31	−28	4	Qualification for Relegation stage Group E

Rules for classification:
- During season: 1) Points; 2) Goal difference; 3) Goals scored
- After season: 1) Points; 2) Head-to-head points; 3) Head-to-head goal difference; 4) Head-to-head goals scored; 5) Goal difference; 6) Goals scored; 7) Disciplinary points (1 point for each yellow card, 3 points for each red card); 8) Draw
  Notes:

===== Group B =====
Pos	Team	Pld	W	D	L	GF	GA	GD	Pts	Promotion, qualification or relegation
1	Qingdao Hainiu	14	9	4	1	25	5	+20	31	Qualification for Promotion stage
2	Dongguan United	14	7	4	3	18	10	+8	25	Qualification for Promotion stage
3	Yichun Grand Tiger	14	5	7	2	13	11	+2	22 (Note: Head-to-head results: Yichun Grand Tiger 0–0 Hebei Zhuoao, Hebei Zhuoao 1–2 Yichun Grand Tiger.)	Qualification for Relegation stage Group E
4	Hebei Zhuoao	14	5	7	2	17	9	+8	22	Qualification for Relegation stage Group F
5	China U-20	14	5	6	3	17	15	+2	21	Qualification for Relegation stage Group E
6	Wuxi Wugou	14	4	2	8	13	18	−5	14	Qualification for Relegation stage Group E
7	Shaanxi Warriors Beyond	14	2	4	8	7	18	−11	10	Qualification for Relegation stage Group E
8	Kunming Zheng He Shipman	14	0	4	10	10	34	−24	4	Qualification for Relegation stage Group F

Rules for classification:
- During season: 1) Points; 2) Goal difference; 3) Goals scored
- After season: 1) Points; 2) Head-to-head points; 3) Head-to-head goal difference; 4) Head-to-head goals scored; 5) Goal difference; 6) Goals scored; 7) Disciplinary points (1 point for each yellow card, 3 points for each red card); 8) Draw
  Notes:

===== Group C =====
Pos	Team	Pld	W	D	L	GF	GA	GD	Pts	Promotion, qualification or relegation
1	Shanghai Jiading Huilong	14	9	2	3	19	8	+11	29	Qualification for Promotion stage
2	Xiamen Egret Island	14	8	4	2	21	9	+12	28	Qualification for Promotion stage
3	Qingdao Youth Island	14	8	2	4	25	15	+10	26	Qualification for Promotion stage
4	Sichuan Minzu	14	6	4	4	17	11	+6	22	Qualification for Relegation stage Group E
5	Quanzhou Yassin	14	5	2	7	10	15	−5	17	Qualification for Relegation stage Group F
6	Qingdao Red Lions	14	4	3	7	12	17	−5	15 (Note: Head-to-head results: Qingdao Red Lions 0–0 Hunan Billows, Hunan Billows 0–1 Qingdao Red Lions.)	Qualification for Relegation stage Group E
7	Hunan Billows	14	4	3	7	8	19	−11	15	Qualification for Relegation stage Group F
8	Yanbian Longding	14	0	4	10	6	24	−18	4	Qualification for Relegation stage Group F

Rules for classification:
- During season: 1) Points; 2) Goal difference; 3) Goals scored
- After season: 1) Points; 2) Head-to-head points; 3) Head-to-head goal difference; 4) Head-to-head goals scored; 5) Goal difference; 6) Goals scored; 7) Disciplinary points (1 point for each yellow card, 3 points for each red card); 8) Draw
  Notes:

===== Ranking of third-placed teams =====
Pos	Grp	Team	Pld	W	D	L	GF	GA	GD	Pts	Qualification
1	C	Qingdao Youth Island	14	8	2	4	25	15	+10	26	Qualification for Promotion stage
2	A	Hebei Kungfu	14	8	2	4	18	10	+8	26	Qualification for Promotion stage
3	B	Yichun Grand Tiger	14	5	7	2	13	11	+2	22	Qualification for Relegation stage Group E

Rules for classification: 1) Points; 2) Goal difference; 3) Goals scored; 4) Disciplinary points (1 point for each yellow card, 3 points for each red card); 5) Draw

==== Second stage ====
===== Group D =====
Pos	Team	Pld	W	D	L	GF	GA	GD	Pts	Promotion, qualification or relegation
1	Qingdao Hainiu (C, P)	14	9	3	2	27	13	+14	30	Promotion to League One
2	Hebei Kungfu (P)	14	9	2	3	23	14	+9	29	Promotion to League One
3	Guangxi Pingguo Haliao (O, P)	14	7	5	2	29	14	+15	26	Qualification for Promotion play-offs
4	Qingdao Youth Island (O, P)	14	5	7	2	19	11	+8	22	Qualification for Promotion play-offs
5	Xiamen Egret Island (R, R)	14	4	4	6	11	20	−9	16	Dissolved after season
6	Shanxi Longjin (D)	14	3	4	7	14	21	−7	13	Dissolved after season
7	Shanghai Jiading Huilong (P)	14	1	7	6	9	19	−10	10	Promotion to League One
8	Dongguan United	14	1	2	11	11	31	−20	5	

Rules for classification:
- During season: 1) Points; 2) Goal difference; 3) Goals scored
- After season: 1) Points; 2) Head-to-head points; 3) Head-to-head goal difference; 4) Head-to-head goals scored; 5) Goal difference; 6) Goals scored; 7) Disciplinary points (1 point for each yellow card, 3 points for each red card); 8) Draw
  (C) Champions; (D) Disqualified; (O) Play-off winners; (P) Promoted; (R) Relegated

===== Group E =====
Pos	Team	Pld	W	D	L	GF	GA	GD	Pts	Promotion, qualification or relegation
1	Wuxi Wugou	7	5	2	0	13	3	+10	17	
2	China U-20	7	3	2	2	11	5	+6	11 (Note: China U-20 finished ahead of Hubei Istar on head-to-head points: Hubei Istar 1–2 China U-20.)	
3	Hubei Istar	7	3	2	2	10	6	+4	11	
4	Yichun Grand Tiger	7	2	3	2	6	6	0	9 (Note: Yichun Grand Tiger finished ahead of Sichuan Minzu on goal difference: Yichun Grand Tiger 0–0 Sichuan Minzu; Goal difference: Yichun Grand Tiger 0 and Sichuan Minzu -1.)	
5	Sichuan Minzu (R, R, R)	7	2	3	2	6	7	−1	9	Dissolved after season
6	Dandong Tengyue	7	2	2	3	4	10	−6	8	
7	Qingdao Red Lions (O)	7	1	4	2	3	4	−1	7	Qualification for relegation play-offs
8	Shaanxi Warriors Beyond (R)	7	1	0	6	3	15	−12	3	Relegation to CMCL

Rules for classification:
- During season: 1) Points; 2) Goal difference; 3) Goals scored
- After season: 1) Points; 2) Head-to-head points; 3) Head-to-head goal difference; 4) Head-to-head goals scored; 5) Goal difference; 6) Goals scored; 7) Disciplinary points (1 point for each yellow card, 3 points for each red card); 8) Draw
  (O) Play-off winners; (R) Relegated
  Notes:

===== Group F =====
Pos	Team	Pld	W	D	L	GF	GA	GD	Pts	Promotion, qualification or relegation
1	Hebei Zhuoao (D, R)	7	4	2	1	9	2	+7	14	Dissolved after season
2	Yanbian Longding	7	2	5	0	9	5	+4	11	
3	Xi'an Wolves (R, D)	7	2	4	1	9	8	+1	10	Dissolved after season
4	Hunan Billows	7	2	3	2	6	5	+1	9 (Note: Hunan Billows finished ahead of Kunming Zheng He Shipman on head-to-head points: Kunming Zheng He Shipman 0–2 Hunan Billows.)	
5	Kunming Zheng He Shipman (D, R)	7	2	3	2	8	10	−2	9	Dissolved after season
6	Inner Mongolia Caoshangfei	7	1	5	1	7	8	−1	8	
7	Shaoxing Keqiao Yuejia (D)	7	1	2	4	4	10	−6	5	Dissolved after season
8	Quanzhou Yassin (T)	7	0	4	3	3	7	−4	4	Relegation to CMCL and a repêchage.

Rules for classification:
- During season: 1) Points; 2) Goal difference; 3) Goals scored
- After season: 1) Points; 2) Head-to-head points; 3) Head-to-head goal difference; 4) Head-to-head goals scored; 5) Goal difference; 6) Goals scored; 7) Disciplinary points (1 point for each yellow card, 3 points for each red card); 8) Draw
  (D) Disqualified; (R) Relegated; (T) Qualified, but not yet for the particular phase indicated
  Notes:

== Women's football ==
=== Super League ===
==== Regular season ====
Pos	Team	Pld	W	D	L	GF	GA	GD	Pts	Qualification
1	Wuhan Jianghan University	9	7	2	0	26	3	+23	23 (Note: Wuhan Jianghan University finished ahead of Shanghai Shengli on goal difference: Wuhan Jianghan University 0–0 Shanghai Shengli; Wuhan Jianghan University +23 and Shanghai Shengli +19.)	Qualification for Championship stage
2	Shanghai Shengli	9	7	2	0	21	2	+19	23	Qualification for Championship stage
3	Changchun Dazhong Zhuoyue	9	5	2	2	17	6	+11	17	Qualification for Championship stage
4	Jiangsu	9	4	4	1	8	4	+4	16	Qualification for Championship stage
5	Meizhou Hakka	9	3	3	3	12	12	0	12	Qualification for Championship stage
6	Beijing BG Phoenix	9	2	3	4	12	20	−8	9	Qualification for Relegation stage
7	Shandong Sports Lottery	9	2	2	5	12	16	−4	8 (Note: Shandong Sports Lottery finished ahead of Henan Jianye on head-to-head points: Shandong Sports Lottery 2–0 Henan Jianye.)	Qualification for Relegation stage
8	Henan Jianye	9	2	2	5	8	25	−17	8	Qualification for Relegation stage
9	Zhejiang	9	0	3	6	5	16	−11	3 (Note: Zhejiang finished ahead of Sichuan on goal difference: Zhejiang 1–1 Sichuan; Zhejiang -11 and Sichuan -17.)	Qualification for Relegation stage
10	Sichuan	9	0	3	6	3	20	−17	3	Qualification for Relegation stage

Rules for classification: 1) Points; 2) Head-to-head points; 3) Head-to-head goal difference; 4) Head-to-head goals scored; 5) Goal difference; 6) Goals scored; 7) Disciplinary points (yellow card = 1 point, red card as a result of two yellow cards = 3 points, direct red card = 3 points, yellow card followed by direct red card = 4 points); 8) Drawing of lots.

==== Championship stage ====
Pos	Team	Pld	W	D	L	GF	GA	GD	Pts	Qualification
1	Jiangsu	4	2	1	1	6	4	+2	7	Qualification for Championship playoffs
2	Wuhan Jianghan University	4	1	3	0	7	4	+3	6 (Note: Wuhan Jianghan University finished ahead of Shanghai Shengli on head-to-head points: Wuhan Jianghan University 4–1 Shanghai Shengli.)	Qualification for Championship playoffs
3	Shanghai Shengli	4	2	0	2	5	6	−1	6	Qualification for Third place playoffs
4	Meizhou Hakka	4	1	1	2	3	5	−2	4 (Note: Meizhou Hakka finished ahead of Changchun Dazhong Zhuoyue on head-to-head points: Meizhou Hakka 2–0 Changchun Dazhong Zhuoyue.)	Qualification for Third place playoffs
5	Changchun Dazhong Zhuoyue	4	1	1	2	5	7	−2	4	

Rules for classification: 1) Points; 2) Head-to-head points; 3) Head-to-head goal difference; 4) Head-to-head goals scored; 5) Goal difference; 6) Goals scored; 7) Disciplinary points (yellow card = 1 point, red card as a result of two yellow cards = 3 points, direct red card = 3 points, yellow card followed by direct red card = 4 points); 8) Drawing of lots.

==== Relegation stage ====
Pos	Team	Pld	W	D	L	GF	GA	GD	Pts	Qualification or relegation
1	Shandong Sports Lottery	4	2	2	0	7	4	+3	8 (Note: Shandong Sports Lottery finished ahead of Henan Jianye on goal difference: Shandong Sports Lottery 1–1 Henan Jianye; Shandong Sports Lottery +3 and Henan Jianye +2.)	Qualification for Sixth place playoffs
2	Henan Jianye	4	2	2	0	3	1	+2	8	Qualification for Sixth place playoffs
3	Sichuan	4	1	2	1	2	2	0	5	Qualification for Eighth place playoffs
4	Beijing BG Phoenix	4	1	1	2	5	6	−1	4	Qualification for Eighth place playoffs
5	Zhejiang (R)	4	0	1	3	2	6	−4	1	Relegation to Football League

Rules for classification: 1) Points; 2) Head-to-head points; 3) Head-to-head goal difference; 4) Head-to-head goals scored; 5) Goal difference; 6) Goals scored; 7) Disciplinary points (yellow card = 1 point, red card as a result of two yellow cards = 3 points, direct red card = 3 points, yellow card followed by direct red card = 4 points); 8) Drawing of lots.
(R) Relegated

=== Football League ===
Pos	Team	Pld	W	D	L	GF	GA	GD	Pts	Qualification or relegation
1	Shaanxi (C, P)	10	10	0	0	25	3	+22	30	Promotion to Super League
2	Guangzhou	10	7	1	2	29	7	+22	22	Qualification for Promotion play-offs
3	Chongqing Lander	10	6	2	2	17	5	+12	20	
4	Dalian Pro	10	5	4	1	19	10	+9	19 (Note: Dalian Pro finished ahead of Tianjin Shengde on head-to-head points: Dalian Pro 2–0 Tianjin Shengde.)	
5	Tianjin Shengde	10	6	1	3	21	9	+12	19	
6	Shanghai Shenhua	10	4	2	4	16	11	+5	14	
7	China U-17	10	4	1	5	19	16	+3	13	
8	Shanghai Qiusheng Donghua	10	3	1	6	13	19	−6	10	
9	Hebei	10	2	2	6	19	21	−2	8	
10	Qingdao Huanghai	10	1	0	9	5	52	−47	3	
11	Yunnan Jiashijing	10	0	0	10	4	34	−30	0	

Rules for classification: 1) Points; 2) Head-to-head points; 3) Head-to-head goal difference; 4) Head-to-head goals scored; 5) Goal difference; 6) Goals scored; 7) Disciplinary points (yellow card = 1 point, red card as a result of two yellow cards = 3 points, direct red card = 3 points, yellow card followed by direct red card = 4 points); 8) Drawing of lots.
(C) Champions; (P) Promoted

== Managerial changes ==
This is a list of changes of managers within Chinese professional league football:

=== Chinese Super League ===
Team	Outgoing manager	Manner of departure	Date of vacancy	Position in table	Incoming manager	Date of appointment
Guangzhou City	(Netherlands) Giovanni van Bronckhorst	Mutual consent	3 December 2020	Pre-season	(Netherlands) Jean-Paul van Gastel	22 February 2021
Wuhan	(China) Pang Li (caretaker)	End of caretaker spell	27 December 2020	Pre-season	(China) Li Xiaopeng	27 December 2020
Shanghai Port	(Portugal) Vítor Pereira	Mutual consent	31 December 2020	Pre-season	(Croatia) Ivan Leko	1 January 2021
Beijing Guoan	(France) Bruno Génésio	Mutual consent	6 January 2021	Pre-season	(Croatia) Slaven Bilić	6 January 2021
Dalian Pro	(Spain) Rafael Benítez	Mutual consent	23 January 2021	Pre-season	(Spain) José González	18 April 2021
Hebei	(China) Xie Feng	Mutual consent	28 March 2021	Pre-season	(South Korea) Kim Jong-boo	28 March 2021
Tianjin Jinmen Tiger	(China) Wang Baoshan	Mutual consent	31 March 2021	Pre-season	(China) Yu Genwei	31 March 2021
Shenzhen	(Netherlands) Jordi Cruyff	Signed by Barcelona	3 June 2021	7th	(Spain) José Carlos Granero	3 June 2021
Shanghai Shenhua	(South Korea) Choi Kang-hee	Resigned	7 August 2021	9th	(China) Mao Yijun (caretaker)	7 August 2021
Cangzhou Mighty Lions	(Iran) (United States) Afshin Ghotbi	Mutual consent	6 September 2021	13th	(China) Liu Yan (caretaker)	6 September 2021
Guangzhou	(Italy) Fabio Cannavaro	Mutual consent	28 September 2021	2nd	(China) Zheng Zhi (player/manager)	7 December 2021
Henan Songshan Longmen	(Spain) Javier Pereira	Mutual consent	7 October 2021	10th	(Spain) Antonio Gómez-Carreño Escalona (caretaker)	7 October 2021
Cangzhou Mighty Lions	(China) Liu Yan (caretaker)	End of caretaker spell	5 November 2021	13th	(Serbia) Svetozar Šapurić	5 November 2021
Wuhan	(China) Li Xiaopeng	Signed by China	3 December 2021	11th	(China) Li Jinyu	4 December 2021
Qingdao	(China) Wu Jingui	Resigned	13 December 2021	16th	(China) Yang Weijian (caretaker)	13 December 2021

=== China League One ===
Team	Outgoing manager	Manner of departure	Date of vacancy	Position in table	Incoming manager	Date of appointment
Shaanxi Chang'an Athletic	(South Korea) Kim Bong-gil	Mutual consent	29 November 2020	Pre-season	(Spain) Óscar Céspedes	23 January 2021
Chengdu Rongcheng	(Spain) José Carlos Granero	Mutual consent	7 December 2020	Pre-season	(South Korea) Seo Jung-won	12 December 2020
Zhejiang	(China) Zheng Xiong	Mutual consent	31 December 2020	Pre-season	(Spain) Jordi Vinyals	1 January 2021
Meizhou Hakka	(Brazil) Marcelo Rospide	Mutual consent	6 February 2021	Pre-season	(Serbia) Milan Ristić	6 February 2021
Zibo Cuju	(China) Hou Zhiqiang	Mutual consent	19 February 2021	Pre-season	(South Korea) Park Chul	19 February 2021
Xinjiang Tianshan Leopard	(China) Polat Kutulk (caretaker)	End of caretaker spell	30 March 2021	Pre-season	(China) Pei Encai	30 March 2021
Nanjing City	(China) Tang Bo	Mutual consent	18 April 2021	Pre-season	(Italy) Fulvio Pea	18 April 2021
Beijing BSU	(China) Su Maozhen	Mutual consent		Pre-season	(China) Zhang Xu	
Zibo Cuju	(South Korea) Park Chul	Mutual consent		Pre-season	(China) Huang Hongyi	
Wuhan Three Towns	(Spain) Albert Garcia Xicota	Sacked	25 July 2021	5th	(Spain) Pedro Morilla	25 July 2021 (Note: Morilla was initially caretaker manager, but was then appointed as manager until the end of the season on 9 December 2021.)
Nantong Zhiyun	(China) Xie Hui	Resigned	22 August 2021	7th	(China) Cao Rui	26 August 2021
Kunshan	(China) Gao Yao	Sacked	16 September 2021	9th	(Spain) Sergio Zarco Díaz	16 September 2021
Xinjiang Tianshan Leopard	(China) Pei Encai	Mutual consent	2 October 2021	17th	(China) Qeriazdan Ashar	2 October 2021
Shaanxi Chang'an Athletic	(Spain) Óscar Céspedes	Sacked	October 2021	7th	(China) Feng Feng (caretaker)	October 2021
Guizhou	(China) Chen Mao	Sacked	27 November 2021	9th	(China) Yuan Yi	27 November 2021
