= 2020 in Chinese football =

Football in China
- Season: 2020

Men's football
- Super League: Jiangsu Suning
- League One: Changchun Yatai
- League Two: Wuhan Three Towns
- CMCL: Guangdong Lianghetang
- FA Cup: Shandong Luneng Taishan

Women's football
- Super League: Wuhan Jianghan University
- Football League: Sichuan

The 2020 season was the 70th season of competitive association football in China.

== AFC competitions ==
=== AFC Champions League ===
==== AFC Champions League qualifying play-offs round ====
===== Play-off round =====
Team 1	Score	Team 2
Shanghai SIPG (China)	3–0	(Thailand) Buriram United

==== Group stage ====
===== Group E =====
Pos	Team	Pld	W	D	L	GF	GA	GD	Pts	Qualification	BEI	MVC	SEO	CHI
1	(China) Beijing Guoan	6	5	1	0	12	4	+8	16	Advance to knockout stage	—	3–1	3–1	1–1
2	(Australia) Melbourne Victory	6	2	1	3	6	9	−3	7	Advance to knockout stage	0–2	—	2–1	1–0
3	(South Korea) FC Seoul	6	2	0	4	10	9	+1	6		1–2	1–0	—	5–0
4	(Thailand) Chiangrai United	6	1	2	3	5	11	−6	5		0–1	2–2	2–1	—

Source: AFC
Rules for classification: Tiebreakers

===== Group F =====
Pos	Team	Pld	W	D	L	GF	GA	GD	Pts	Qualification	ULS	TOK	SSH	PRG
1	(South Korea) Ulsan Hyundai	6	5	1	0	14	5	+9	16	Advance to knockout stage	—	1–1	3–1	2–0
2	(Japan) FC Tokyo	6	3	1	2	6	5	+1	10	Advance to knockout stage	1–2	—	0–1	1–0
3	(China) Shanghai Shenhua	6	2	1	3	9	13	−4	7		1–4	1–2	—	3–3
4	(Australia) Perth Glory	6	0	1	5	5	11	−6	1		1–2	0–1	1–2	—

Source: AFC
Rules for classification: Tiebreakers

===== Group G =====
Pos	Team	Pld	W	D	L	GF	GA	GD	Pts	Qualification	VIS	SUW	GZE	JDT
1	(Japan) Vissel Kobe	4	2	0	2	4	5	−1	6	Advance to knockout stage	—	0–2	0–2	~~5–1~~
2	(South Korea) Suwon Samsung Bluewings	4	1	2	1	3	2	+1	5	Advance to knockout stage	0–1	—	0–0	~~25 Nov~~
3	(China) Guangzhou Evergrande	4	1	2	1	4	4	0	5		1–3	1–1	—	~~4 Dec~~
4	(Malaysia) Johor Darul Ta'zim	0	0	0	0	0	0	0	0	Withdrew, results expunged (Note: Johor Darul Ta'zim were unable to travel to Qatar to play the final four matches of the group stage after their application for permission to travel was refused by the Malaysian government due to COVID-19 pandemic travel restrictions. They were considered to have withdrawn from the competition, and their results were expunged.)	~~1 Dec~~	~~2–1~~	~~19 Nov~~	—

Source: AFC
Rules for classification: Tiebreakers

===== Group H =====
Pos	Team	Pld	W	D	L	GF	GA	GD	Pts	Qualification	YOK	SSI	JEO	SYD
1	(Japan) Yokohama F. Marinos	6	4	1	1	13	5	+8	13	Advance to knockout stage	—	1–2	4–1	4–0
2	(China) Shanghai SIPG	6	3	0	3	6	10	−4	9	Advance to knockout stage	0–1	—	0–2	0–4
3	(South Korea) Jeonbuk Hyundai Motors	6	2	1	3	8	10	−2	7		1–2	1–2	—	1–0
4	(Australia) Sydney FC	6	1	2	3	8	10	−2	5		1–1	1–2	2–2	—

Source: AFC
Rules for classification: Tiebreakers

==== Knockout stage ====
===== Round of 16 =====
Team 1	Score	Team 2
Beijing FC (China)	1–0	(Japan) FC Tokyo
Vissel Kobe (Japan)	2–0	(China) Shanghai SIPG

===== Quarter-finals =====
Team 1	Score	Team 2
Ulsan Hyundai (South Korea)	2–0	(China) Beijing FC

== Men's football ==
League	Promoted to league	Relegated from league	Expelled or Dissolved	Re-elected
Super League	Qingdao Huanghai; Shijiazhuang Ever Bright	Beijing Renhe	Tianjin Tianhai	None
League One	Liaoning Shenyang Urban; Chengdu Better City; Taizhou Yuanda; Suzhou Dongwu; Jiangxi Liansheng; Sichuan Jiuniu; Kunshan	None	Guangdong South China Tiger; Sichuan Longfor; Liaoning; Shanghai Shenxin	None
League Two	Nanjing Fengfan; Shenzhen Bogang; Xi'an UKD; Shanghai Jiading Boji; Qingdao Zhongchuang Hengtai	None	Baoding Yingli Yitong; Dalian Chanjoy; Fujian Tianxin; Hangzhou Wuyue Qiantang; Jilin Baijia; Lhasa Urban Construction Investment; Nanjing Shaye; Shenzhen Pengcheng; Yanbian Beiguo; Yinchuan Helanshan	None

=== Super League ===
==== Regular season ====
===== Group A =====
Pos	Team	Pld	W	D	L	GF	GA	GD	Pts	Qualification or relegation
1	Guangzhou Evergrande Taobao (Q)	14	11	1	2	31	12	+19	34	Qualification for Championship stage
2	Jiangsu Suning (C, Q)	14	7	5	2	23	15	+8	26	Qualification for Championship stage
3	Shandong Luneng Taishan (Q)	14	7	3	4	19	11	+8	24	Qualification for Championship stage
4	Shanghai Greenland Shenhua (Q)	14	5	6	3	16	15	+1	21	Qualification for Championship stage
5	Shenzhen (Q)	14	5	2	7	20	20	0	17	Qualification for Relegation stage
6	Guangzhou R&F (Q)	14	4	3	7	14	28	−14	15	Qualification for Relegation stage
7	Dalian Pro (Q)	14	2	5	7	18	21	−3	11	Qualification for Relegation stage
8	Henan Jianye (Q)	14	1	3	10	14	33	−19	6	Qualification for Relegation stage

Source: CSL, Soccerway
Rules for classification:
- During season: 1) Points; 2) Goal difference; 3) Goals scored.
- After season: 1) Points; 2) Head-to-head points; 3) Head-to-head goal difference; 4) Head-to-head goals scored; 5) Scores of the weight ratio of the reserve league and youth leagues.
  (C) Champions; (Q) Qualified for the phase indicated

===== Group B =====
Pos	Team	Pld	W	D	L	GF	GA	GD	Pts	Qualification or relegation
1	Shanghai SIPG (Q)	14	10	2	2	26	11	+15	32	Qualification for Championship stage
2	Beijing Sinobo Guoan (Q)	14	8	4	2	36	19	+17	28	Qualification for Championship stage
3	Chongqing Dangdai Lifan (Q)	14	7	3	4	22	19	+3	24 (Note: Head-to-head results: Chongqing Dangdai Lifan 3–1 Hebei China Fortune, Hebei China Fortune 2–2 Chongqing Dangdai Lifan)	Qualification for Championship stage
4	Hebei China Fortune (Q)	14	7	3	4	25	23	+2	24	Qualification for Championship stage
5	Wuhan Zall (Q)	14	5	2	7	16	16	0	17 (Note: Head-to-head results: Shijiazhuang Ever Bright 1–0 Wuhan Zall, Wuhan Zall 2–1 Shijiazhuang Ever Bright)	Qualification for Relegation stage
6	Shijiazhuang Ever Bright (Q)	14	4	5	5	18	21	−3	17	Qualification for Relegation stage
7	Qingdao Huanghai (Q)	14	2	4	8	15	27	−12	10	Qualification for Relegation stage
8	Tianjin TEDA (Q)	14	0	3	11	8	30	−22	3	Qualification for Relegation stage

Source: CSL
Rules for classification:
- During season: 1) Points; 2) Goal difference; 3) Goals scored.
- After season: 1) Points; 2) Head-to-head points; 3) Head-to-head goal difference; 4) Head-to-head goals scored; 5) Scores of the weight ratio of the reserve league and youth leagues.
  (Q) Qualified for the phase indicated
  Notes:

=== League One ===
==== Regular season ====
===== Group A =====
Pos	Team	Pld	W	D	L	GF	GA	GD	Pts	Qualification or relegation
1	Chengdu Better City (H)	10	8	1	1	15	7	+8	25	Qualification for Promotion stage and qualification to the 2020 Chinese FA Cup
2	Taizhou Yuanda	10	5	3	2	13	8	+5	18	Qualification for Promotion stage and qualification to the 2020 Chinese FA Cup
3	Beijing Renhe	10	5	1	4	14	12	+2	16	Qualification for Relegation stage Group E
4	Beijing BSU	10	3	2	5	14	14	0	11	Qualification for Relegation stage Group E
5	Suzhou Dongwu	10	2	1	7	7	15	−8	7 (Note: Head-to-head results: Suzhou Dongwu 0–0 Inner Mongolia Zhongyou, Inner Mongolia Zhongyou 0–2 Suzhou Dongwu)	Qualification for Relegation stage Group F
6	Inner Mongolia Zhongyou	10	1	4	5	5	12	−7	7	Qualification for Relegation stage Group F

Rules for classification:
- During season: 1) Points; 2) Goal difference; 3) Goals scored.
- After season: 1) Points; 2) Head-to-head points; 3) Head-to-head goal difference; 4) Head-to-head goals scored; 5) Scores of the weight ratio of the reserve league and youth leagues.
  (H) Hosts
  Notes:

===== Group B =====
Pos	Team	Pld	W	D	L	GF	GA	GD	Pts	Qualification or relegation
1	Meizhou Hakka (H)	10	6	4	0	20	9	+11	22	Qualification for Promotion stage and qualification to the 2020 Chinese FA Cup
2	Zhejiang Energy Greentown	10	5	4	1	19	8	+11	19	Qualification for Promotion stage and qualification to the 2020 Chinese FA Cup
3	Shaanxi Chang'an Athletic	10	4	3	3	11	10	+1	15	Qualification for Relegation stage Group F
4	Guizhou Hengfeng	10	2	4	4	9	12	−3	10	Qualification for Relegation stage Group E
5	Liaoning Shenyang Urban	10	2	3	5	9	14	−5	9	Qualification for Relegation stage Group E
6	Jiangxi Liansheng	10	1	2	7	6	21	−15	5	Qualification for Relegation stage Group F

Rules for classification:
- During season: 1) Points; 2) Goal difference; 3) Goals scored.
- After season: 1) Points; 2) Head-to-head points; 3) Head-to-head goal difference; 4) Head-to-head goals scored; 5) Scores of the weight ratio of the reserve league and youth leagues.
  (H) Hosts

===== Group C =====
Pos	Team	Pld	W	D	L	GF	GA	GD	Pts	Qualification or relegation
1	Changchun Yatai	10	6	3	1	20	7	+13	21	Qualification for Promotion stage and qualification to the 2020 Chinese FA Cup
2	Kunshan F.C. (H)	10	5	3	2	10	7	+3	18	Qualification for Promotion stage and qualification to the 2020 Chinese FA Cup
3	Nantong Zhiyun	10	4	4	2	9	9	0	16	Qualification for Relegation stage Group F
4	Heilongjiang Lava Spring	10	1	7	2	5	6	−1	10	Qualification for Relegation stage Group F
5	Sichuan Jiuniu	10	1	6	3	8	12	−4	9	Qualification for Relegation stage Group E
6	Xinjiang Tianshan Leopard	10	0	3	7	5	16	−11	3	Qualification for Relegation stage Group E

Rules for classification:
- During season: 1) Points; 2) Goal difference; 3) Goals scored.
- After season: 1) Points; 2) Head-to-head points; 3) Head-to-head goal difference; 4) Head-to-head goals scored; 5) Scores of the weight ratio of the reserve league and youth leagues.
  (H) Hosts

==== Championship stage ====
===== Group D =====
Pos	Team	Pld	W	D	L	GF	GA	GD	Pts	Qualification or relegation
1	Changchun Yatai (C, P)	5	4	1	0	8	0	+8	13	Promotion to the Chinese Super League
2	Zhejiang Energy Greentown	5	3	1	1	8	5	+3	10	Qualification to the promotion play-offs
3	Kunshan F.C.	5	2	1	2	4	5	−1	7	
4	Chengdu Better City	5	2	1	2	5	7	−2	7	
5	Meizhou Hakka	5	2	0	3	7	7	0	6	
6	Taizhou Yuanda (Note: Taizhou Yuanda was dissolved after 2020 season.) (D)	5	0	0	5	3	11	−8	0	Disbanded after season

Rules for classification:
- During season: 1) Points; 2) Goal difference; 3) Goals scored.
- After season: 1) Points; 2) Head-to-head points; 3) Head-to-head goal difference; 4) Head-to-head goals scored; 5) Scores of the weight ratio of the reserve league and youth leagues.
  (C) Champions; (D) Disqualified; (P) Promoted
  Notes:

==== Relegation stage ====
===== Group E =====
Pos	Team	Pld	W	D	L	GF	GA	GD	Pts	Qualification or relegation
1	Guizhou Hengfeng	5	4	0	1	11	4	+7	12	Qualification to the 2020 Chinese FA Cup
2	Beijing BSU	5	2	2	1	7	4	+3	8	
3	Sichuan Jiuniu	5	2	2	1	6	5	+1	8	
4	Liaoning Shenyang Urban	5	1	2	2	5	8	−3	5	
5	Beijing Renhe (Note: Beijing Renhe was dissolved after 2020 season.) (R, D, R)	5	1	1	3	6	12	−6	4	Qualification to the relegation play-offs and disbanded after season
6	Xinjiang Tianshan Leopard (O)	5	0	3	2	5	7	−2	3	Qualification to the relegation play-offs

Rules for classification:
- During season: 1) Points; 2) Goal difference; 3) Goals scored.
- After season: 1) Points; 2) Head-to-head points; 3) Head-to-head goal difference; 4) Head-to-head goals scored; 5) Scores of the weight ratio of the reserve league and youth leagues.
  (D) Disqualified; (O) Play-off winners; (R) Relegated
  Notes:

===== Group F =====
Pos	Team	Pld	W	D	L	GF	GA	GD	Pts	Qualification or relegation
1	Suzhou Dongwu	5	2	2	1	5	5	0	8	Qualification to the 2020 Chinese FA Cup
2	Shaanxi Chang'an Athletic	5	1	3	1	3	3	0	6 (Note: Head-to-head results: Shaanxi Chang'an Athletic 1–0 Nantong Zhiyun; Inner Mongolia Zhongyou 1–1 Shaanxi Chang'an Athletic; Nantong Zhiyun 2–1 Inner Mongolia Zhongyou.)	
3	Nantong Zhiyun	5	1	3	1	7	7	0	6	
4	Inner Mongolia Zhongyou (Note: Inner Mongolia Zhongyou was dissolved after 2020 season.) (D, R)	5	1	3	1	8	7	+1	6	Disbanded after season
5	Heilongjiang Lava Spring (O)	5	0	5	0	3	3	0	5	Qualification to the relegation play-offs
6	Jiangxi Liansheng (O)	5	0	4	1	8	9	−1	4	Qualification to the relegation play-offs

Rules for classification:
- During season: 1) Points; 2) Goal difference; 3) Goals scored.
- After season: 1) Points; 2) Head-to-head points; 3) Head-to-head goal difference; 4) Head-to-head goals scored; 5) Scores of the weight ratio of the reserve league and youth leagues.
  (D) Disqualified; (O) Play-off winners; (R) Relegated
  Notes:

=== League Two ===
==== Regular season ====
===== Group A =====
Pos	Team	Pld	W	D	L	GF	GA	GD	Pts	Qualification or relegation
1	Nanjing Fengfan (P)	9	8	1	0	16	4	+12	25	Qualification to promotion play-offs
2	Beijing BIT (P)	9	5	3	1	15	6	+9	18	Qualification to promotion play-offs
3	Qingdao Jonoon	9	4	4	1	14	7	+7	16	
4	Qingdao Zhongchuang Hengtai	9	4	2	3	11	9	+2	14	
5	Shenzhen Bogang (D)	9	2	4	3	11	15	−4	10	Dissolved after season
6	Xi'an Daxing Chongde	9	2	4	3	8	10	−2	10	
7	Qingdao Red Lions	9	1	5	3	4	7	−3	8	
8	Hebei Aoli Jingying	9	1	3	5	5	9	−4	6	
9	Inner Mongolia Caoshangfei	9	0	5	4	6	13	−7	5	
10	Jiangsu Yancheng Dingli (R, R)	9	0	5	4	4	14	−10	5	Qualification to relegation play-offs and dissolved after season

Rules for classification:
- During season: 1) Points; 2) Goal difference; 3) Goals scored.
- After season: 1) Points; 2) Head-to-head points; 3) Head-to-head goal difference; 4) Head-to-head goals scored; 5) Scores of the weight ratio of the reserve league and youth leagues.
  (D) Disqualified; (P) Promoted; (R) Relegated

===== Group B =====
Pos	Team	Pld	W	D	L	GF	GA	GD	Pts	Qualification or relegation
1	Wuhan Three Towns (P)	10	8	0	2	18	5	+13	24	Qualification to promotion play-offs
2	Zibo Cuju (P)	10	7	1	2	14	8	+6	22	Qualification to promotion play-offs
3	Hubei Chufeng United	10	6	0	4	11	9	+2	18	
4	Shanghai Jiading Boji	10	5	2	3	10	5	+5	17	
5	Yunnan Kunlu	10	4	3	3	8	6	+2	15	
6	Zhejiang Yiteng	10	3	5	2	9	9	0	14	
7	China U-19	10	4	1	5	12	10	+2	13	
8	Xi'an UKD	10	3	4	3	10	11	−1	13	
9	Hunan Billows	10	4	0	6	10	17	−7	12	
10	Guangxi Baoyun	10	2	2	6	8	13	−5	8	
11	Shanxi Longjin (O)	10	0	0	10	4	21	−17	0	Qualification to relegation play-offs

Rules for classification:
- During season: 1) Points; 2) Goal difference; 3) Goals scored.
- After season: 1) Points; 2) Head-to-head points; 3) Head-to-head goal difference; 4) Head-to-head goals scored; 5) Scores of the weight ratio of the reserve league and youth leagues.
  (O) Play-off winners; (P) Promoted

== Women's football ==
=== Super League ===
==== Regular season ====
Pos	Team	Pld	W	D	L	GF	GA	GD	Pts	Qualification or relegation
1	Wuhan Jianghan University	9	8	1	0	28	3	+25	25	Qualification for Championship stage
2	Shanghai Shengli	9	8	0	1	31	6	+25	24	Qualification for Championship stage
3	Beijing BG Phoenix	9	6	0	3	21	9	+12	18 (Note: Head-to-head results: Jiangsu Suning 1–2 Beijing BG Phoenix)	Qualification for Championship stage
4	Jiangsu Suning	9	6	0	3	24	12	+12	18	Qualification for Championship stage
5	Changchun Dazhong Zhuoyue	9	5	2	2	23	10	+13	17	Qualification for Relegation stage
6	Shandong Sports Lottery	9	3	2	4	9	15	−6	11	Qualification for Relegation stage
7	Meizhou Huijun	9	2	2	5	10	18	−8	8	Qualification for Relegation stage
8	Zhejiang	9	1	2	6	4	26	−22	5	Qualification for Relegation stage
9	Henan Jianye	9	1	1	7	5	19	−14	4	Qualification for Relegation stage
10	Hebei China Fortune	9	0	0	9	4	41	−37	0	Qualification for Relegation stage

Source: Official Website (Desktop view), Official Website (Mobile view)
Rules for classification: 1) Points; 2) Head-to-head points; 3) Head-to-head goal difference; 4) Head-to-head goals scored; 5) Goal difference; 6) Goals scored; 7) Disciplinary points (yellow card = 1 point, red card as a result of two yellow cards = 3 points, direct red card = 3 points, yellow card followed by direct red card = 4 points); 8) Drawing of lots.

==== Championship stage ====
Pos	Team	Pld	W	D	L	GF	GA	GD	Pts	Qualification or relegation
1	Wuhan Jianghan University	3	2	0	1	8	4	+4	6 (Note: Head-to-head results: Wuhan Jianghan University 1–0 Jiangsu Suning)	Qualification for Championship playoffs
2	Jiangsu Suning	3	2	0	1	2	1	+1	6	Qualification for Championship playoffs
3	Shanghai Shengli	3	1	1	1	6	6	0	4	Qualification for Third place playoffs
4	Beijing BG Phoenix	3	0	1	2	2	7	−5	1	Qualification for Third place playoffs

Source: Official Website (Desktop view), Official Website (Mobile view)
Rules for classification: 1) Points; 2) Head-to-head points; 3) Head-to-head goal difference; 4) Head-to-head goals scored; 5) Goal difference; 6) Goals scored; 7) Disciplinary points (yellow card = 1 point, red card as a result of two yellow cards = 3 points, direct red card = 3 points, yellow card followed by direct red card = 4 points); 8) Drawing of lots.

==== Relegation stage ====
Pos	Team	Pld	W	D	L	GF	GA	GD	Pts	Qualification or relegation
1	Changchun Dazhong Zhuoyue	5	4	1	0	14	3	+11	13	
2	Meizhou Huijun	5	3	2	0	12	5	+7	11	
3	Shandong Sports Lottery	5	3	0	2	14	6	+8	9	
4	Henan Jianye	5	2	1	2	8	5	+3	7	
5	Zhejiang	5	1	0	4	2	16	−14	3	
6	Hebei China Fortune (R)	5	0	0	5	0	15	−15	0	Relegation to CWFL

Source: Official Website (Desktop view), Official Website (Mobile view)
Rules for classification: 1) Points; 2) Head-to-head points; 3) Head-to-head goal difference; 4) Head-to-head goals scored; 5) Goal difference; 6) Goals scored; 7) Disciplinary points (yellow card = 1 point, red card as a result of two yellow cards = 3 points, direct red card = 3 points, yellow card followed by direct red card = 4 points); 8) Drawing of lots.
(R) Relegated

=== Football League ===
Pos	Team	Pld	W	D	L	GF	GA	GD	Pts	Qualification or relegation
1	Sichuan (C, P)	6	5	1	0	16	3	+13	16	Promotion to Women's Super League
2	Shaanxi Daqing Spring	6	4	2	0	14	2	+12	14	
3	Dalian Pro	6	3	1	2	9	5	+4	10	
4	Shanghai Greenland Shenhua	6	2	1	3	9	12	−3	7 (Note: Head-to-head results: Chongqing 0–1 Shanghai Greenland Shenhua)	
5	Chongqing Lander	6	2	1	3	4	6	−2	7	
6	Guangzhou Evergrande Taobao	6	1	1	4	4	9	−5	4	
7	Yunnan Jiashijing	6	0	1	5	2	21	−19	1	

Source: Official Website (Desktop view), Official Website (Mobile view)
Rules for classification: 1) Points; 2) Head-to-head points; 3) Head-to-head goal difference; 4) Head-to-head goals scored; 5) Goal difference; 6) Goals scored; 7) Disciplinary points (yellow card = 1 point, red card as a result of two yellow cards = 3 points, direct red card = 3 points, yellow card followed by direct red card = 4 points); 8) Drawing of lots.
(C) Champions; (P) Promoted

== Managerial changes ==
This is a list of changes of managers within Chinese professional league football:

=== Chinese Super League ===
Team	Outgoing manager	Manner of departure	Date of vacancy	Position in table	Incoming manager	Date of appointment
Chongqing Dangdai Lifan	(Netherlands) Jordi Cruyff	Mutual consent	14 December 2019	Pre-season	(South Korea) Chang Woe-ryong	18 December 2019
Wuhan Zall	(China) Li Tie	Signed by China	2 January 2020	Pre-season	(Spain) José González	4 January 2020
Guangzhou R&F	(Serbia) Dragan Stojković	Mutual consent	3 January 2020	Pre-season	(Netherlands) Giovanni van Bronckhorst	4 January 2020
Qingdao Huanghai	(Spain) Juan Manuel Lillo	Mutual consent	5 June 2020	Pre-season	(China) Wu Jingui	4 August 2020
Henan Jianye	(China) Wang Baoshan	Mutual consent	6 July 2020	Pre-season	(China) Yang Ji (caretaker)	9 July 2020
Shenzhen	(Italy) Roberto Donadoni	Sacked	11 August 2020	Group A, 6th	(Netherlands) Jordi Cruyff	14 August 2020
Tianjin TEDA	(Germany) Uli Stielike	Sacked	19 August 2020	Group B, 8th	(China) Wang Baoshan	19 August 2020
Henan Jianye	(China) Yang Ji (caretaker)	End of caretaker spell	11 September 2020	Group A, 8th	(Spain) Javier Pereira	11 September 2020
Wuhan Zall	(Spain) José González	Sacked	24 September 2020	Group B, 6th	(China) Pang Li (caretaker)	24 September 2020
Shandong Luneng Taishan	(China) Li Xiaopeng	Mutual consent	5 October 2020	Group A, 3rd	(China) Hao Wei	5 October 2020

=== China League One ===
Team	Outgoing manager	Manner of departure	Date of vacancy	Position in table	Incoming manager	Date of appointment
Changchun Yatai	(Serbia) Svetozar Šapurić	Sacked	3 November 2019	Pre-season	(Uzbekistan) Samvel Babayan	2 December 2019
Meizhou Hakka	(China) Zheng Xiaotian	Signed by Beijing Sinobo Guoan	6 November 2019	Pre-season	(Brazil) Marcelo Rospide	20 December 2019
Shaanxi Chang'an Athletic	(China) Wang Bo	Signed by Beijing Renhe	10 November 2019	Pre-season	(South Korea) Kim Bong-gil	16 December 2019
Guizhou Hengfeng	(China) Chen Mao	Mutual consent	26 November 2019	Pre-season	(China) Wang Xinxin	26 November 2019
Nantong Zhiyun	(England) Gary White	Mutual consent	31 March 2020	Pre-season	(China) Xie Hui	31 March 2020
Sichuan Jiuniu	(China) Wang Hongwei	Mutual consent	18 May 2020	Pre-season	(China) Li Yi	22 July 2020
Inner Mongolia Zhongyou	(China) Chen Yang	Mutual consent	25 August 2020	Pre-season	(South Korea) Choi Jin-han	1 September 2020
Changchun Yatai	(Uzbekistan) Samvel Babayan	Sacked	5 October 2020	Group C, 2nd	(China) Chen Yang	5 October 2020
Xinjiang Tianshan Leopard	(Spain) Fernando	Sacked	10 October 2020	Group C, 6th	(China) Polat Kutulk (caretaker)	12 October 2020
Guizhou Hengfeng	(China) Wang Xinxin	Mutual consent	13 October 2020	Group B, 5th	(China) Chen Mao	13 October 2020
Suzhou Dongwu	(China) Liu Junwei	Sacked	18 October 2020	Group A, 5th	(England) Gary White	24 October 2020
