= 2021 Chinese Women's Football League =

Chinese Women's Football League
- Season: 2021
- Dates: 27 July – 24 October 2021
- Champions: Shaanxi
- Promoted: Shaanxi
- Matches: 55
- Goals: 187 (3.4 per match)
- Top goalscorer: Zhang Linyan (9 goals)
- Biggest home win: China U-17 9–0 Qingdao Huanghai (14 October 2021)
- Biggest away win: Qingdao Huanghai 0–8 Tianjin Shengde (11 October 2021); Qingdao Huanghai 1–9 Hebei (18 October 2021)
- Highest scoring: Qingdao Huanghai 1–9 Hebei (18 October 2021)
- Longest winning run: 10 matches Shaanxi
- Longest unbeaten run: 10 matches Shaanxi
- Longest winless run: 10 matches Yunnan Jiashijing
- Longest losing run: 10 matches Yunnan Jiashijing

The 2021 Chinese Women's Football League, officially known as the 2021 China Taiping Chinese Football Association Women's Football League (Chinese: 2021中国太平中国足球协会女子甲级联赛) for sponsorship reasons, was the 7th season in its current incarnation. In this season, all matches were held at the Dalian Youth Football Training Base, Dalian, Liaoning. It began on 27 July 2021 and concluded on 24 October 2021. In this season, the number of clubs was expanded from 7 to 11.

== Clubs ==
=== Club changes ===
==== To Football League ====
Clubs promoted from 2020 Chinese Women's League Two

- Shanghai Qiusheng Donghua
- Qingdao Huanghai
- Tianjin Shengde

Clubs relegated from 2020 Chinese Women's Super League

- Hebei China Fortune

==== From Football League ====
Clubs promoted to 2021 Chinese Women's Super League

- Sichuan

=== Name changes ===
- Guangzhou Evergrande Taobao changed their name to Guangzhou.
- Hebei China Fortune changed their name to Hebei

=== Stadiums and locations ===
Team	Head coach	City	Stadium	Capacity	2020 season
Hebei	(China) Jiao Yuying				1st
Shaanxi	(China) Liu Huana				2nd
Dalian Pro	(China) Fan Yiying				3rd
Shanghai Shenhua	(China) Ye Zhijing				4th
Chongqing Lander	(China) Jia Jing				5th
Guangzhou	(China) Li Kun				6th
Yunnan Jiashijing	(China) Gao Fulin				7th
Shanghai Qiusheng Donghua	(China) Qiu Jingwei				League Two, 1st
Qingdao Huanghai	(China) Nie Chao				League Two, 2nd
Tianjin Shengde	(China) Liu Bing				League Two, 3rd
China U-17	(China) Wang Anzhi				Invited team

== League table ==
Pos	Team	Pld	W	D	L	GF	GA	GD	Pts	Qualification or relegation
1	Shaanxi (C, P)	10	10	0	0	25	3	+22	30	Promotion to Super League
2	Guangzhou	10	7	1	2	29	7	+22	22	Qualification for Promotion play-offs
3	Chongqing Lander	10	6	2	2	17	5	+12	20	
4	Dalian Pro	10	5	4	1	19	10	+9	19 (Note: Dalian Pro finished ahead of Tianjin Shengde on head-to-head points: Dalian Pro 2–0 Tianjin Shengde.)	
5	Tianjin Shengde	10	6	1	3	21	9	+12	19	
6	Shanghai Shenhua	10	4	2	4	16	11	+5	14	
7	China U-17	10	4	1	5	19	16	+3	13	
8	Shanghai Qiusheng Donghua	10	3	1	6	13	19	−6	10	
9	Hebei	10	2	2	6	19	21	−2	8	
10	Qingdao Huanghai	10	1	0	9	5	52	−47	3	
11	Yunnan Jiashijing	10	0	0	10	4	34	−30	0	

Rules for classification: 1) Points; 2) Head-to-head points; 3) Head-to-head goal difference; 4) Head-to-head goals scored; 5) Goal difference; 6) Goals scored; 7) Disciplinary points (yellow card = 1 point, red card as a result of two yellow cards = 3 points, direct red card = 3 points, yellow card followed by direct red card = 4 points); 8) Drawing of lots.
(C) Champions; (P) Promoted

== Results ==
Home \ Away	CHN	CQL	DLP	DHU	GZH	HEB	QDH	SHX	SHS	TJS	YNJ
China U-17		0–3	0–0			3–0	9–0				4–0
Chongqing Lander			1–1	3–0	1–0	1–0				0–2	
Dalian Pro				3–1	3–3	2–2			3–1	2–0	
Shanghai Qiusheng Donghua	0–2				0–4		3–0	1–3	1–0		
Guangzhou	6–0						7–0	0–1	2–1		3–0
Hebei				0–0	1–3			1–3	1–4	1–4	
Qingdao Huanghai		0–3	0–2			1–9				0–8	4–2
Shaanxi	2–0	2–1	1–0				5–0				2–0
Shanghai Shenhua	4–1	0–0					4–0	0–3			2–0
Tianjin Shengde	1–0			3–2	0–1			0–3	0–0		
Yunnan Jiashijing		0–4	1–3	1–5		0–4				0–3	

Legend: Blue = home team win; Yellow = draw; Red = away team win.
For upcoming matches, an "a" indicates there is an article about the rivalry between the two participants.

== Positions by round ==
To preserve chronological evolvements, any postponed matches are not included to the round at which they were originally scheduled, but added to the full round they were played immediately afterwards. For example, if a match is scheduled for round 7, but then played between rounds 8 and 9, it will be added to the standings for round 8.

Team ╲ Round	1	2	3	4	5	6	7	8	9	10	11
Shaanxi	5	3	4	4	3	2	2	1	1	1	1
Guangzhou	3	1	1	1	1	1	1	2	2	2	2
Chongqing Lander	2	2	3	3	2	3	4	3	4	4	3
Dalian Pro	4	5	5	5	7	6	6	6	5	5	4
Tianjin Shengde	8	7	6	6	5	5	3	4	3	3	5
Shanghai Shenhua	1	4	2	2	4	4	5	5	6	6	6
China U-17	7	6	9	10	10	8	7	7	7	7	7
Shanghai Qiusheng Donghua	9	10	7	7	6	7	8	8	9	9	8
Hebei	6	8	8	9	9	10	9	9	8	8	9
Qingdao Huanghai	11	11	11	8	8	9	10	10	10	10	10
Yunnan Jiashijing	10	9	10	11	11	11	11	11	11	11	11

Leader and promotion to Super League
Qualification for Promotion play-offs

== Results by match played ==
Team ╲ Round	1	2	3	4	5	6	7	8	9	10	11
China U-17	L	D	L	L	L	W	W	W	L	N	W
Chongqing Lander	W	W	L	W	W	L	D	D	N	W	W
Dalian Pro	W	D	D	L	N	W	D	D	W	W	W
Shanghai Qiusheng Donghua	L	L	W	N	W	L	L	D	L	L	W
Guangzhou	W	W	W	W	W	W	L	D	W	L	N
Hebei	N	L	D	L	L	L	W	D	W	L	L
Qingdao Huanghai	L	L	L	W	L	N	L	L	L	L	L
Shaanxi	W	W	N	W	W	W	W	W	W	W	W
Shanghai Shenhua	W	D	W	W	L	L	N	D	L	W	L
Tianjin Shengde	L	D	W	L	W	W	W	N	W	W	L
Yunnan Jiashijing	L	N	L	L	L	L	L	L	L	L	L

W = Win; D = Draw; L = Loss
