= 2022 Chinese Women's Football League =

Chinese Women's Football League
- Season: 2022
- Dates: 11 April – 17 September 2022
- Champions: Zhejiang
- Promoted: Zhejiang; Yongchuan Chashan Zhuhai

The 2022 Chinese Women's Football League, officially known as the 2022 China Taiping Chinese Football Association Women's Football League (Chinese: 2022中国太平中国足球协会女子甲级联赛) for sponsorship reasons, was the 8th season in its current incarnation. It was held from 11 April to 17 September 2022.

== Effects of the COVID-19 pandemic ==
On 9 April, the Chinese Football Association announced dates and the format of the season. The season will be held from 11 April to 9 September 2022 and it was divided into regular season and promotion stage. The regular season was divided into 3 stages (5, 3, 3 rounds respectively). In the first stage, 12 teams were divided into 2 groups of six teams. In the second and the third stage, the teams in 2 groups will be switched to ensure that each team would play against each other once. Six highest-ranked teams after the third stage will qualify for the promotion stage. In the promotion stage, each team will play against each other once.

Shanghai Shenhua withdrew from the first stage due to travel restrictions as a result of the lockdown measures enforced in Shanghai due to the COVID-19 pandemic.

=== Groups ===
Team	2021 season	Group		
Team	2021 season	First stage	Second stage	Third stage
Zhejiang	Super League, 10th	A	C	E
Guangzhou	2nd	B	D	E
Yongchuan Chashan Zhuhai	3rd	B	D	E
Dalian Pro	4th	A	C	E
Tianjin Shengde	5th	A	C	E
Shanghai Shenhua	6th	B	D	E
China U-17	7th	A	D	F
Shanghai Qiusheng Donghua	8th	B	C	F
Hebei	9th	A	D	F
Yunnan Jiashijing	11th	A	D	F
Guangxi Pingguo Beinong	League Two, 1st	B	C	F
Hainan Qiongzhong	League Two, 2nd	B	C	F

==== Centralised venues ====
- Kunming (Groups A, B)
  - Yunnan Haigeng Football Training Base
- Dalian (Groups C, D, E and F)
  - Dalian Youth Football Training Base
- Chengdu (Promotion stage)
  - Wenjiang Football Training Base

==== Dates ====
- First stage (Round 1-5): 11–25 April
- Second stage (Round 6-8): 22–31 May
- Third stage (Round 9-11): 2–9 June
- Promotion stage: 5–17 September

== Clubs ==
=== Club changes ===
==== To Football League ====
Teams relegated from 2021 Chinese Women's Super League

- Zhejiang

Club promoted from 2021 Chinese Women's League Two

- Guangxi Pingguo Beinong
- Hainan Qiongzhong

==== From Football League ====
Club promoted to 2022 Chinese Women's Super League

- Shaanxi Chang'an Athletic

Dissolved entries

- ~~Qingdao Huanghai~~

=== Name changes ===
- Chongqing Lander W.F.C. changed their name to Yongchuan Chashan Zhuhai.

=== Stadiums and locations ===
Team	Head coach	City	Stadium	Capacity	2021 season
Zhejiang	(China) Gao Rongming				Super League, 10th
Guangzhou	(China) Li Kun				2nd
Yongchuan Chashan Zhuhai	(China) Jia Jing				3rd
Dalian Pro	(China) Fan Yiying				4th
Tianjin Shengde	(China) Liu Bing				5th
Shanghai Shenhua	(China) Ye Zhijing				6th
China U-17	(China) Wang Anzhi				7th
Shanghai Qiusheng Donghua	(China) Qiu Jingwei				8th
Hebei	(China) Jiao Yuying				9th
Yunnan Jiashijing	(China) Gao Fulin				11th
Guangxi Pingguo Beinong	(China) Li Huayun				League Two, 1st
Hainan Qiongzhong	(China) Zi Jingjing				League Two, 2nd

== Regular season ==
=== League table ===
Pos	Team	Pld	W	D	L	GF	GA	GD	Pts	Qualification
1	Zhejiang	11	8	2	1	27	8	+19	26	Qualification for Promotion stage
2	Shanghai Qiusheng Donghua	11	7	1	3	21	9	+12	22	Qualification for Promotion stage
3	China U-17	11	6	2	3	16	8	+8	20	
4	Yongchuan Chashan Zhuhai	11	5	5	1	12	6	+6	20	Qualification for Promotion stage
5	Dalian Pro	11	6	2	3	18	12	+6	20	Qualification for Promotion stage
6	Guangzhou	11	4	6	1	15	9	+6	18	Qualification for Promotion stage
7	Hebei	11	5	2	4	18	9	+9	17	Qualification for Promotion stage
8	Hainan Qiongzhong	11	4	3	4	14	10	+4	15	
9	Tianjin Shengde	11	3	2	6	9	16	−7	11	
10	Yunnan Jiashijing	11	2	2	7	7	23	−16	8	
11	Guangxi Pingguo Beinong	11	1	3	7	5	19	−14	6	
12	Shanghai Shenhua	11	0	0	11	0	33	−33	0	Withdrew

Rules for classification: 1) Points; 2) Head-to-head points; 3) Head-to-head goal difference; 4) Head-to-head goals scored; 5) Goal difference; 6) Goals scored; 7) Disciplinary points (yellow card = 1 point, red card as a result of two yellow cards = 3 points, direct red card = 3 points, yellow card followed by direct red card = 4 points); 8) Drawing of lots.

=== Results ===
Home \ Away	CHN	DLP	GPB	GZH	HNQ	HEB	SQD	SHS	TJS	YCZ	YNJ	ZHJ
China U-17					3–0	0–2	0–1	3–0			3–0	
Dalian Pro	0–3						2–1	3–0	3–1	1–1		
Guangxi Pingguo Beinong	0–2	0–3		1–1				3–0	0–2			
Guangzhou	0–0	2–1			1–1	3–2	0–0			1–1		
Hainan Qiongzhong		1–1	3–0				0–3				5–0	0–1
Hebei		1–2	0–0		0–0					0–1	3–0	
Shanghai Qiusheng Donghua			2–1			0–2			3–0	1–2		4–2
Shanghai Shenhua				0–3	0–3	0–3	0–3		0–3		0–3	
Tianjin Shengde	0–1			1–3	0–1	0–4				0–0		1–1
Yongchuan Chashan Zhuhai	1–1		1–0		1–0			3–0			1–1	0–1
Yunnan Jiashijing		1–2	0–0	1–0			0–3		0–1			1–5
Zhejiang	4–0	1–0	5–0	1–1		3–1		3–0				

Legend: Blue = home team win; Yellow = draw; Red = away team win.
For upcoming matches, an "a" indicates there is an article about the rivalry between the two participants.

=== Positions by round ===
To preserve chronological evolvements, any postponed matches are not included to the round at which they were originally scheduled, but added to the full round they were played immediately afterwards. For example, if a match is scheduled for round 7, but then played between rounds 8 and 9, it will be added to the standings for round 8.

Team ╲ Round	1	2	3	4	5	6	7	8	9	10	11
Zhejiang	2	1	1	2	1	1	2	1	1	1	1
Shanghai Qiusheng Donghua	3	3	3	4	3	3	4	3	2	2	2
China U-17	11	11	8	7	5	6	5	5	6	4	3
Yongchuan Chashan Zhuhai	5	4	2	1	2	2	1	2	3	3	4
Dalian Pro	4	5	5	3	6	4	3	4	4	6	5
Guangzhou	6	6	7	6	7	7	8	7	5	5	6
Hebei	1	2	4	5	4	5	7	8	7	7	7
Hainan Qiongzhong	7	8	10	9	8	8	6	6	8	8	8
Tianjin Shengde	12	10	9	10	10	10	10	10	10	9	9
Yunnan Jiashijing	8	9	11	11	11	11	11	9	9	10	10
Guangxi Pingguo Beinong	9	7	6	8	9	9	9	11	11	11	11
Shanghai Shenhua	10	12	12	12	12	12	12	12	12	12	12

Qualification for Promotion stage

=== Results by match played ===
Team ╲ Round	1	2	3	4	5	6	7	8	9	10	11
China U-17	L	L	W	W	W	D	W	D	L	W	W
Dalian Pro	W	W	L	W	L	W	W	D	D	L	W
Guangxi Pingguo Beinong	L	D	W	L	L	L	L	L	D	D	L
Guangzhou	D	D	D	W	D	D	L	W	W	W	D
Hainan Qiongzhong	D	L	L	W	W	D	W	D	L	L	W
Hebei	W	W	L	L	W	D	L	L	W	D	W
Shanghai Qiusheng Donghua	W	W	D	L	W	W	L	W	W	W	L
Shanghai Shenhua	L	L	L	L	L	L	L	L	L	L	L
Tianjin Shengde	L	L	W	D	L	L	L	W	L	W	D
Yongchuan Chashan Zhuhai	W	W	W	W	D	D	W	D	D	L	D
Yunnan Jiashijing	L	L	L	L	L	D	W	W	D	L	L
Zhejiang	W	W	W	D	W	W	W	L	W	W	D

W = Win; D = Draw; L = Loss

== Promotion stage ==
=== League table ===
Pos	Team	Pld	W	D	L	GF	GA	GD	Pts	Promotion or qualification
1	Zhejiang (C, P)	5	4	1	0	12	5	+7	13	Promotion to Super League
2	Yongchuan Chashan Zhuhai (P)	5	4	1	0	9	2	+7	13	Promotion to Super League
3	Dalian Pro	5	3	0	2	9	6	+3	9	Qualification for Promotion play-offs
4	Shanghai Qiusheng Donghua	5	2	0	3	10	10	0	6	
5	Guangzhou	5	1	0	4	7	9	−2	3	
6	Hebei	5	0	0	5	0	15	−15	0	

Rules for classification: 1) Points; 2) Head-to-head points; 3) Head-to-head goal difference; 4) Head-to-head goals scored; 5) Goal difference; 6) Goals scored; 7) Disciplinary points (yellow card = 1 point, red card as a result of two yellow cards = 3 points, direct red card = 3 points, yellow card followed by direct red card = 4 points); 8) Drawing of lots.
(C) Champions; (P) Promoted

=== Results ===
Home \ Away	DLP	GZH	HEB	SQD	YCZ	ZHJ
Dalian Pro		3–1		3–2		
Guangzhou					0–1	1–2
Hebei	0–3	0–3				
Shanghai Qiusheng Donghua		3–2	3–0		0–2	
Yongchuan Chashan Zhuhai	1–0		3–0			2–2
Zhejiang	2–0		3–0	3–2		

Legend: Blue = home team win; Yellow = draw; Red = away team win.
For upcoming matches, an "a" indicates there is an article about the rivalry between the two participants.

=== Positions by round ===
To preserve chronological evolvements, any postponed matches are not included to the round at which they were originally scheduled, but added to the full round they were played immediately afterwards. For example, if a match is scheduled for round 2, but then played between rounds 3 and 4, it will be added to the standings for round 3.

Team ╲ Round	1	2	3	4	5
Zhejiang	1	1	1	1	1
Yongchuan Chashan Zhuhai	3	2	2	2	2
Dalian Pro	5	3	4	4	3
Shanghai Qiusheng Donghua	2	4	3	3	4
Guangzhou	4	5	5	5	5
Hebei	6	6	6	6	6

Leader and promotion to Super League
Runner-up and promotion to Super League
Qualification for Promotion play-offs

=== Results by match played ===
Team ╲ Round	1	2	3	4	5
Dalian Pro	L	W	L	W	W
Guangzhou	L	L	L	W	L
Hebei	L	L	L	L	L
Shanghai Qiusheng Donghua	W	L	W	L	L
Yongchuan Chashan Zhuhai	W	W	W	D	W
Zhejiang	W	W	W	D	W

W = Win; D = Draw; L = Loss
