= Kenny Brown (footballer) =

English footballer and manager

Personal information
- Full name: Kenneth James Brown
- Date of birth: 11 July 1967 (age 59)
- Place of birth: Barking, England
- Height: 5 ft 8 in (1.73 m)
- Position: Defender

Senior career*
Years	Team	Apps	(Gls)
1986–1988	Norwich City	25	(0)
1988–1991	Plymouth Argyle	126	(4)
1991–1996	West Ham United	63	(5)
1995	→ Huddersfield Town (loan)	5	(0)
1995	→ Reading (loan)	12	(1)
1996	→ Southend United (loan)	6	(0)
1996	→ Crystal Palace (loan)	6	(2)
1996	→ Reading (loan)	5	(0)
1996–1997	→ Birmingham City (loan)	2	(0)
1997	Birmingham City	9	(0)
1997–1998	Millwall	45	(0)
1998–1999	Gillingham	4	(0)
- Kingstonian
- Portadown
2000–2003	Barry Town	82	(1)
2003–200?	Tilbury		
- CD Torrevieja

Managerial career
- 2000–2003: Barry Town
- 2006–2009: CD Jávea
- 2009–2011: Grays Athletic (Assistant manager)
- 2011–2012: Tooting & Mitcham United
- 2013: Chelmsford City (Assistant manager)
- 2013: Chelmsford City (Caretaker manager)
- * Club domestic league appearances and goals

Kenneth James Brown (born 11 July 1967) is an English former professional footballer and current West Ham United academy manager. As a player, he played for Norwich City, Plymouth Argyle, West Ham United, Huddersfield Town, Reading, Southend United, Crystal Palace, Reading, Birmingham City, Millwall, Gillingham, Kingstonian, Portadown, Barry Town, Tilbury and FC Torrevieja. He has also managed Barry Town, CD Jávea, and Tooting & Mitcham United and been assistant manager with Grays Athletic and Chelmsford City. Following the departure of Dean Holdsworth as manager of Chelmsford in November 2013, Brown became their caretaker manager.

== Career ==
Brown, a defender, began his career with Norwich City under the management of his father before playing for Plymouth Argyle, West Ham United, Huddersfield Town (loan), Reading (loan), Southend United (loan), Crystal Palace (loan), Birmingham City, Millwall, Gillingham, Kingstonian, Tilbury and Barry Town. He spent some time in Spain with FC Torrevieja before retiring from playing football. He famously scored the winning goal for West Ham United in a league match against Manchester United on 22 April 1992, handing Leeds United the impetus in that season's title race.

He was manager of CD Jávea, a Spanish regional league side who played in the Valenciana Regional Preferente Group IV from 2006 to 2009. Grays Athletic announced an offer had been put to Brown to become assistant manager to Julian Dicks on 18 September 2009. Jávea denied Brown had agreed terms two days later, before confirming his departure later that day. In the 2012–13 season he was lead development coach and first team coach at Barnet, departing at the end of the season.

In July 2013, Brown joined Chelmsford City as assistant manager to Dean Holdsworth who was appointed in May 2013. Following a 6–0 defeat by Boreham Wood, Holdsworth left the club in November 2013 with Brown taking over as caretaker manager. Brown joined Dagenham & Redbridge FC as Academy Manager in July 2014 before moving to Millwall as head of coaching in February 2016. Brown's return to West Ham, commencing in January 2022 as coach to their under 9 to 14 age group was announced in December 2021. Brown was appointed as West Ham's academy manager in February 2023.

== Personal life ==
His father, also called Ken, was also a professional footballer and managed Norwich City and Plymouth Argyle and his son Luis played in the Arsenal Academy.

Brown is an ambassador for an all-female football academy run by former Arsenal & La Masia youth player, Judan Ali.
