= CD Jávea =

Spanish football club

Jávea
- Full name: Club Deportivo Jávea
- Nickname: Los Rojiblancos
- Founded: 1939; 87 years ago
- Stadium: Campo d'Esports Municipal, Xàbia–Jávea; Valencian Community, Spain
- Capacity: 2,000
- Head coach: Julio Ivorra
- League: Lliga Comunitat – South
- 2025–26: Lliga Comunitat – South, 6th of 16
Home colours	Away colours

Club Deportivo Jávea is an association football club based in Jávea, Spain, which competes in the Lliga Comunitat – South. Founded in 1939, it has spent the vast majority of its history playing regional football in the Comunidad Valenciana. The club is based at the Campo d'Esports Municipal, a council-owned football ground to the south of the town.

== History ==
CD Jávea have been part of the community of Xàbia–Jávea for 80 years.

CD Jávea were last promoted to the Third Division in the early 90s and within three years they were back in the Regional Preferente. In 2001/02 CD Jávea finished second in group IV behind a very powerful 'B' side from Hércules CF but lost their play-off round to SD Sueca to miss out on promotion to the Third Division. Two seasons later, a late run of form from the rojiblancos put them in good stead to claim another play-off spot but just one point from the last two games meant that they finished four points off the zone in 5th spot.

In 2006/07 CD Jávea almost left the Regional Preferente but in the wrong direction in a chaotic season for the football club. Young manager Alberto Araujo was tasked with putting together an exciting side that could challenge for promotion but by late November the club was just above the relegation zone. The club's board acted with knee-jerk reaction and sacked Alberto and three key first-team players; amazingly they discovered their fate on regional radio and the club was set to self-destruct as players refused to train. Ultimately Alberto stayed on a club for another six weeks as the club sought to avoid controversy, a clause in the coach's contract citing right to dismissal if the club wasn't in the top ten by the season's midpoint. On 14 January 2007, CD Jávea drew 1–1 at CD Polop and sat in 15th spot. Alberto departed the club.

Former FC Torrevieja player Kenny Brown was sought after as a suitable replacement, having the sort of coaching credentials that would suit the ambitions of the club. However bureaucracy at the Federation meant that he wasn't permitted to assume responsibilities on match-day and coach Mitgeta took on a caretaker-coach role. Jávea won just once in 21 games between 5 November 2006 and 6 May 2007 and a 0–1 home defeat at the hands on UD Altea forced the rojiblancos into the drop zone. Yet somehow the players pulled themselves off their knees and carved out two remarkable wins, a 2–1 away victory at Albatera CF and a 4–2 home win over CD Polop on the last day of season which secured safety by two points.

At the end of the 2006/7 season, English businessman Mark Catlin was elected president of the club after having spent a period as 'commercial director'. Catlin moved enthusiastically to steady a ship sailing dangerously close to stormy waters.

In January 2008 CD Jávea were featured on British television in a Sky Sports special called "La Lower Liga" which explored the impact of the British ex-pat community on football on Spain's Costa Blanca. Whilst CD Jávea was heavily featured, the programme also featured Gifton Noel-Williams who was playing for Second Division Elche CF at the time. A follow-up programme entitled "La Lower Liga: The Second Half" was broadcast in the summer of 2008. Also featured in the programmes were CD Jávea's international supporters club, the Peña Javeamigos.

As a consequence of the programmes, CD Jávea received well over 100 emails from players and coaches in the UK, including Football League side Southend United. A partnership agreement was signed in the summer of 2008 which resulted in three young Southend players flying out to the Costa Blanca to join CD Jávea for a six-month loan spell, although just one managed to last the entire period. No further contact has been made with the club with regards to this agreement since the end of 2008.

The 2009/10 season began with coach Kenny Brown leaving the club after just three games to take up an assistant manager position at Grays Athletic in the UK, hoping to help former teammate Julian Dicks guide the club away from the Conference National relegation zone. Former player and captain Jose Luis Bisquert was appointed as head coach a few days later.

In October 2009 President Mark Catlin resigned from his position, citing broken promises made to him by the local council during the summer of 2009. (Catlin subsequently joined English League One side Bury as 'commercial director. However a group of local's came together to form a caretaker board to take responsibility for the running of the club. Through their hard work in promoting the club across the town, support for the club began to build again despite the lack of progress on the pitch. The club finished the 2009/10 season in 13th spot and, although relegation was ultimately avoided, it had come close for a few weeks during the late winter.

With the club in dire financial trouble, a policy of encouraging local talent was pursued and the squad was built around local players, many of whom had been released by other clubs in the area. The 2010/11 season began badly, the worst start for some time with five straight defeats and two draws saw CD Jávea firmly established at the very bottom of the table. The fans had to wait until late October for the club's first win of the season, a 3–2 home victory over U.D. Horadada and the 'rojiblancos' gradually lifted themselves away from the wrong end of the table with a series of much improved performances, including a 4–1 thumping of play-off contenders Hércules C.F. "B". The season continued to be a mixed bag of results, the most disappointing of all being the spineless 5–1 defeat at close rivals U.D. Altea who would finish the season as group champions and ultimately win promotion to the Third Division through the play-offs. CD Jávea finished the season in 11th spot with Armando Lemos hitting 11 goals of the club's 42 goals that season.

The 2011/12 season was ultimately one of the most successful seasons for almost a decade. With José Luis Bisquert still at the helm, the side started slowly with three successive draws and a defeat but a run of three consecutive wins including a stunning 4–0 away demolition of U.D. Aldaya saw the 'rojiblancos' quickly rise up the table and, despite the occasional wobble, mainly against the sides pushing for a play-off spot, the side made a serious bid for the top four. Indeed, a run of six wins in seven games lifted the side into fourth spot and within a whisker of a play-off place. But then a miserable final run of five games without a win saw CD Jávea slip to 6th, including a 1–0 home defeat to relegated Torrent C.F. on the last day of the season, a loss that ended hopes of lasting the whole season undefeated at home. Yet, it was the club's highest finished since 2003 and promised much for the future.

Yet after a showing early promise, the 2012/13 season proved disappointing for the team, despite a start which saw CD Jávea in early contention for a play-off place. The 'rojiblancos' drew 15 of their 34 games and won only two games in the second half of a season which included an eleven-game run without a win. The two victories – one at home against Racing Algemesi and the second away at UD Ondarense – would be against two sides who would ultimately be relegated. CD Jávea finished 10th, twelve points clear of the relegation zone but 28 points behind the play-off places. After losing only three matches at the start of the season, the club's results declined considerably in the second half, however their early form ensured they avoided relegation comfortably.

With coach José Luis Bisquert able to add some experience to the side during the summer of 2013, including the arrival of Dani García from CD Dénia and Sergio Mesa from CD Llosa, the 2013/14 season would be very interesting. An unlucky opening day defeat at CD Dénia was followed by an eight-game unbeaten run in which Dani García would score four goals, including two stunning strikes that would have been worthy of a greater stage. The rojiblancos would finish in 8th spot.

2014–2015 CD Javea finished sixth but had put in a claim for a top three place for much of the season until a 0–6 home defeat to Recambios Colon CF applied the brakes on the ambition (Recambios Colon would go on to win promotion to the Third Division). The rojiblancos also recorded some of their biggest wins in their history when they crushed CD Chella 8–1 before defeating relegation-bound Catarroja CF 6–0 on their own pitch. The club finished third top scoring team in the league with 67 goals in 34 games behind UD Alginet (81) and Recambios Colon CF (70) and scored 21 of those goals in their last five games of the season. The board that was going to take over the club did not count on José Luis Bisquert to continue as coach.

2015–2016 CD Jávea's new board of directors confirmed the appointment of a new coach in Jesús Moratal, formerly of CD Dénia. After a mixed pre-season campaign, his first league match in charge was a 0–0 home draw in the Marina Alta derby against his former club. It took eight games to get a first win under his belt, a 2–0 home victory over perennial strugglers Pego CF, by which time Jávea had slipped to 16th position in the table. The wins started coming gradually but mixed results saw the rojiblancos rarely threaten the top half of the table and in November 2015 Moratal was relieved of duty and in January 2016 replaced by former UD Canals and UD Beniganim coach Juanjo Cháfer García. His impact was immediate. Jávea went on a nine-match unbeaten run to climb to fifth and make a valid claim for the top three but a curious collapse in the final six games in which the rojiblancos recorded just one win saw the side slip out of contention and finish 8th, nine points off the top three.

2016–2017 A new season, a new coach. After failing to reach a deal with Juanjo Cháfer, the club acquired the services of renowned coach Antonio Villaescusa who arrived in June 2016 having previously coached at CD Benidorm, CF La Nucia, CD Polop and at rivals CD Dénia. Several new arrivals replaced departures, the most controversial of which was the departure of former skipper Javi Hernandez to CD Dénia, both parties having failed to come to a mutual agreement for the long-standing attacking midfielder to remain at Jávea. In came former Real Madrid academy player Petu from Orihuela CF, defensive midfielder Gervasio from CD Dénia, midfielder Jaime Agulló from CD Benidorm, midfielder David Cardona returning to the club from CD Dénia and Eduardo Samblas from UD Portuarios. Pre-season was hardly inspiring, five draws and a single win against UD Levante Juvenil and the side started the season in similar fashion, drawing four and losing twice in the opening six games to sit precariously in 16th spot. And then something clicked and Jávea went on a run of 11 games with just one defeat including four wins on the trot to climb to fifth spot and in with a shout of the play-offs. A stumble in February of just two wins in five saw the top three slide steadily away into the distance and the emphasis, for the fans at least, seemed to change to finishing as the top Marina Alta side in the group. And that meant defeating CD Dénia in the penultimate game of the season. In March the side picked up three decent wins, including a strong 2–0 win against play-off contenders UD Gandia but a run of three games without a victory at the end of April and beginning of May, including a 1–0 defeat at rivals CD Dénia, saw any slim hope of a play-off spot gone. On the final day of the season, a close game against UE CF Tavernes saw Jávea come out top with a late goal to snatch all three points and finish in 6th position.

2017–2018 With coach Antonio Villaescusa staying on for another season the squad had a familiar look to it. pre-season was promising with four wins and a draw from the six friendly games including a 6–0 thumping of CD Polop and a 5–0 win over UD Oliva with new striker Lucas Bou scoring a brace in each game and chalking up six pre-season goals. And the opening fortnight of the 2017/18 season continued the form with a tough 1–1 home draw over UD Carcaixent followed a 6–0 away win at UD Canals to see Jávea sit in 2nd spot. But two tough defeats, one a 1–4 reverse at home to arch rivals CD Dénia, saw the side slip into the bottom half of the table. But the squad rallied and a run of five wins in six saw them crawl back up the table and by the Christmas break CD Jávea was sitting in a comfortable fifth spot. Off the pitch the long-promised was finally becoming a reality and forced the club to play its "home" fixtures against CF Tous and UD Canals in Benissa. A 2–0 win over the latter saw the club climb into the top three. But then a run of four games without a win, including a 1–2 reverse in Dénia, saw the club slide out of the play-offs and spectators suggesting a curse of the roof, an uninspiring construction that created a number of restricted views ... but seats were finally installed. The final third of the season was disappointing and just two wins in the final nine games meant that the club had to settle for 7th spot, a massive 13 points adrift on the top three.

2018–2019 Coach Antonio Villaescusa was staying on for a third season and, once his position had been confirmed, he set about building a strong squad to offer a real challenge to the top of the table. Roberto, Lucas Bou, Rubén Ortolá, Rafa del Castillo and Paulo all signed on for another year whilst Vicente Palau, Adrián Salom and Vicente Sellens joined from UD Beniganim, a side which finished 4th the previous season, narrowly missing out on the play-offs, whils Favio Orosio arrived from CD Polop. The pre-season warm up games resulted in a clean sweep with five wins from five and just one goal conceded. The season proper opened with a 2–1 win at newly promoted CF L'Olleria and followed by a 2–0 home win over CD Enguera. But whilst the side remained unbeaten for the opening 16 games and conceded just eight goals in the process, ten of those games were draws and in mid-December the board decided that the senior side needed a change at the helm; Villaescusa was relieved on his duties on 17 December. He was in charge for 84 games, winning 36 giving a win percentage of 43%, but it wasn't enough for an ambitious club. On 18 December former CD Dénia coach Juan Carlos Signes was named as successor; he arrived with a decent pedigree having guided the Dénia to the promotion play-offs in 2016–2017 and 2017–2018. However, in his first game in charge at home to Muro CF, Jávea lost its unbeaten run and conceded two goals for the first time since the beginning of May 2018. The second half of the season saw Jávea battle to keep in touch with the top three, a strong trio of eventual champions CD Dénia, UD Castellonense and UD Beniganim. Two more defeats followed (against the latter two) and a few draws – a total of 15 in the season – but Jávea found their shooting boots, putting six past Montse Sion, and five past Racing Rafelcofer and Muro CF as they fought to claim a top three spot, eventually missing out by just two points, finishing 4th, their highest position for 16 years.

2019–2020 Coach Juan Carlos Signes was able to build his own team over the summer but had a mixed pre-season, winning four and losing three. The opening game of the season was a 0–1 home reverse to Pego CF in the first of three Marina Alta derbies of the season but after wins against CD Dénia and Racing Rafelcofer CF, the side sat in second place. Just four defeats in the opening half of the season saw the side enter the Christmas break in fifth spot but the team had promised so much more and the board of directors acted, dismissing Juan Carlos Signes after a run of three games without a win saw Jávea slide slowly away from the top three. He was replaced in the New Year by Roberto Granero, a very experienced coach in the Valencian region who had recently guided UD Atzeneta into the Third Division. After a 0–0 draw at Pego CF, Granero masterminded a 2–1 win over CD Dénia to complete the double over the arch-rivals but the teams above refused to drop points and although CD Jávea kept on the pressure, they couldn't quite get out of that fifth position and by the time the season was suspended in March, thanks to the COVID-19 health crisis, they were still four points off the play-off spots. In May, the FFCV opted to end the 2019–20 season and CD Jávea would remain in 5th position.

2020–2021 A new coach was named at the end of May 2020 as CD Jávea prepared for the new season. After being mooted for the position at the beginning of the year when Juan Carlos Signes was dismissed, former CD Dénia coach Diego Miñana finally arrived in Jávea and he spent the summer building a strong squad with just one objective, promotion. At the end of July 2020, the FFCV announced that CD Jávea would be played in Group V of a new-look Regional Preferente which has been divided into smaller groups to reduce both the games and the travelling as Spain continued its fight against COVID-19. The new season would start a month later in October. CD Jávea started well with a 3–2 away win over fierce rivals CD Dénia but then confounded supporters by losing 0–2 at home to unfancied Racing Rafelcofer CF. Three wins in a row put Jávea amongst the front runners but a home defeat to league leaders (and eventual champions) CFI Alicante followed by a disappointing 0–0 draw in La Nucia saw the rojiblancos drop out of the top three. And then the third wave of COVID-19 infections swept across Spain and non-professional football was suspended from the end of November 2020 until mid-March 2021. CD Jávea pushed hard after the restart but three months of inactivity was taking its toll and the injury list mounted, forcing head coach Diego Miñana to call up several young reserve team players. They fitted it as well as they could but Jávea dropped too many points before the disappointment of a 1–2 defeat in Alicante, which all but ended play-off aspirations, was further compounded by five senior players testing positive for COVID-19. The suspension of two matches meant that a patched up Jávea side would finish the season playing three games in six days. However, it included a stunning 4–2 home win over second place CF UE Tavernes followed by 4–1 home crushing of CD Pedreguer just 48 hours later. A 0–1 loss at CD UE Calpe saved the hosts from relegation. CD Jávea finished 3rd, their highest position for almost two decades.

2021–2022 Within days of the season's end, coach Diego Miñana opted to leave the club, telling fans in a Twitter post that "it’s been a difficult year with many complications but I’m leaving with memories of the good times". He was replaced by former CD Dénia head coach Manuel Esteban, who had played for the club during the 2014/15 season. At the club's AGM on Wednesday 28 July, the entire board of directors of CD Jávea resigned, citing lack of enthusiasm to be able to face a new season and particularly dealing with the bureaucracy of the town hall as it transpires that the council had not yet handed over 117,000 euros, the annual municipal grant, due to an external audit. Immediately the club was plunged into a crisis and needed to find a new board to take the club forward. On the eve of the season, a consortium of colleagues took over the running of the club and CD Jávea opened the season with a 2–1 away win over CE Pedreguer. By the beginning of October, CD Jávea topped the table for the first time in 19 years and the feel-good factor saw sweeping through the club. But something happened. The team chalked up seven successive defeats, including a crushing 1–4 reverse against Calp CF in the inaugural match in the new regional Nosta Cup, and after a 1–2 home defeat to the same side in the league on the first match after the Christmas break, coach Manuel Estaban was dismissed and replaced by Argentine Lauro Techeira. The second half of the season was better with just three defeats in 15 games but one of those defeats included a 0–6 thrashing at champions CF Gandía and there were eight draws which left the club sitting in 10th spot in a 16 team league. Within a week Techeira offered his resignation, stating that We worked together and got through a very delicate situation at the club but now it is time to leave". he was replaced by Juan Carlos Signes who returned to club some two and half years after being dismissed during the shortened 2019/20 season.

2022–2023 Preparations for the new season didn't begin well. At the end of July, the entire management board of the club resigned over claims of lack of financial support and the future looked bleak for the football club. The town hall responded by claiming that just over 117,000 euros was available to the club "if the required paperwork is presented correctly and a couple of days later, the management board withdrew its resignation after a meeting with the town hall, releasing a statement that said that "after the meeting held today at the town hall, the resignation has been reconsidered and announces that it is once again taking a step forward to continue trying stabilize the club’s situation". At the beginning of August, the FFCV confirmed that the Regional Preferente would be reverting to the pre-Covid structure of four regional groups and that CD Jávea had been placed in Group 3 and would kick-off the new campaign with a home game against SD Sueca. A goal from Rubén Ortolá gave the rojiblancos an opening day win and some optimism for the season. But just three wins in 16 games saw the club sitting in 17th spot and, although there would be no relegation this season due to a major restructuring of regional football in the Comunidad Valenciana, the position was not acceptable to the club's management board and Juan Carlos Signed was resigned. Former player and academy coach Julio Ivorra was handed the reins and saw an opportunity to recover the club's fortunes: “The situation is complicated, so I take the opportunity to call on members, fans and, above all, the academy players, because one day you will be the ones on the pitch; to support the team every Sunday. Let’s push every ball together." After a difficult 0–2 defeat at champions-elect Ontinyent 1931 CF, the "Ivorra Effect" slowly took hold and the side carved out eleven wins in 18 games and suffered just three defeats to climb up the table and move into the top half. On the final day of the season, some 1,500 fans turned out to cheer on the team to a historic 2–1 win over Ontinyent 1931 CF and secure an effective "promotion" to the new Lliga Comunitat, the highest tier in amateur football in the Comunidad Valenciana.

2023–2024 A new elite league featuring the best sides in the Valencian region was never going to be an easy task for a club like CD Jávea against some well-funded sides such as David Villa's CF Benidorm – who would finish champions – Crevillente Deportivo and CD Olímpic. The season opened with a crushing 2–5 defeat at Hércules CF ‘B’ which was followed by a painful 0–2 home defeat to arch rivals CD Dénia and an away trip to early pace-setters CD Eldense ‘B’ during which the side shipped another five goals to leave them rock bottom of the table after the first three games. It was going to be hard but no-one expected such a disappointing start to the campaign. By the end of October, the rojiblancos had picked up four points to climb into 14th spot but a bruising 0–7 defeat by CF Benidorm, the heaviest loss for CD Jávea for over 40 years. By the end of the first half of the season, the rojiblancos were bottom of the club with 13 points from 15 games and just 13 goals scored. Head coach Julio Ivorra needed to work his magic again and he almost did so. With three games remaining, after a stunning 3–2 home win over champions-elect CF Benidorm put the travelling army celebrations on hold for 24 hours, CD Jávea was out of the relegation zone. However, just one point from those final three games confirmed the inevitable, the club's first relegation since the end of the 1994/95 season.

== Season to season ==
Season	Tier	Division	Place	Copa del Rey
1939–1963	—	Regional	—	
1963–64	5	2ª Reg.	2nd	
1964–65	4	1ª Reg.	4th	
1965–66	4	1ª Reg.	2nd	
1966–67	3	3ª	16th	
1967–68	3	3ª	16th	
1968–69	4	1ª Reg.	16th	
1969–70	4	1ª Reg.	7th	
1970–71	4	Reg. Pref.	17th	
1971–72	4	Reg. Pref.	9th	
1972–73	4	Reg. Pref.	16th	
1973–74	4	Reg. Pref.	20th	
1974–75	5	1ª Reg.	16th	
1975–76	5	1ª Reg.	13th	
1976–77	5	1ª Reg.	15th	
1977–78	6	1ª Reg.	5th	
1978–79	6	1ª Reg.	6th	
1979–80	6	1ª Reg.	10th	
1980–81	6	1ª Reg.	7th	
1981–82	6	1ª Reg.	2nd	

Season	Tier	Division	Place	Copa del Rey
1982–83	6	1ª Reg.	2nd	
1983–84	6	1ª Reg.	14th	
1984–85	6	1ª Reg.	5th	
1985–86	6	1ª Reg.	1st	
1986–87	5	Reg. Pref.	8th	
1987–88	5	Reg. Pref.	8th	
1988–89	5	Reg. Pref.	8th	
1989–90	5	Reg. Pref.	1st	
1990–91	4	3ª	3rd	
1991–92	4	3ª	7th	First round
1992–93	4	3ª	10th	
1993–94	4	3ª	16th	
1994–95	4	3ª	18th	
1995–96	5	Reg. Pref.	14th	
1996–97	5	Reg. Pref.	11th	
1997–98	5	Reg. Pref.	9th	
1998–99	5	Reg. Pref.	5th	
1999–2000	5	Reg. Pref.	6th	
2000–01	5	Reg. Pref.	5th	
2001–02	5	Reg. Pref.	5th	

Season	Tier	Division	Place	Copa del Rey
2002–03	5	Reg. Pref.	2nd	
2003–04	5	Reg. Pref.	9th	
2004–05	5	Reg. Pref.	7th	
2005–06	5	Reg. Pref.	7th	
2006–07	5	Reg. Pref.	14th	
2007–08	5	Reg. Pref.	9th	
2008–09	5	Reg. Pref.	7th	
2009–10	5	Reg. Pref.	13th	
2010–11	5	Reg. Pref.	11th	
2011–12	5	Reg. Pref.	6th	
2012–13	5	Reg. Pref.	10th	
2013–14	5	Reg. Pref.	9th	
2014–15	5	Reg. Pref.	6th	
2015–16	5	Reg. Pref.	8th	
2016–17	5	Reg. Pref.	6th	
2017–18	5	Reg. Pref.	7th	
2018–19	5	Reg. Pref.	4th	
2019–20	5	Reg. Pref.	5th	
2020–21	5	Reg. Pref.	3rd	
2021–22	6	Reg. Pref.	10th	

Season	Tier	Division	Place	Copa del Rey
2022–23	6	Reg. Pref.	8th	
2023–24	6	Lliga Com.	16th	
2024–25	7	1ª FFCV	1st	
2025–26	6	Lliga Com.	6th	
2026–27	6	Lliga Com.		

- 7 seasons in Tercera División

== Squad 2023–24 ==
Note: Flags indicate national team as defined under FIFA eligibility rules; some limited exceptions apply. Players may hold more than one non-FIFA nationality.

No.	Pos.	Nation	Player
—	GK	ESP	Antonio López "Tonet"
—	GK	ESP	Aaron Rebelles
—	DF	ARG	Aldo Oldrich Michan
—	DF	SEN	Isac Gomis
—	DF	ESP	Marcos Bisquert Ribes
—	DF	ESP	Victor Caturla "Catu"
—	DF	ESP	Guillermo Castro "Willy"
—	MF	ESP	Adrián Ramis
—	MF	ESP	Carlos Bisquert
—	MF	ESP	David Buigues
—	MF	ESP	Francisco Javier Hernandez "Javi"

No.	Pos.	Nation	Player
—	MF	ESP	Francisco José Muñoz "Fran"
—	MF	ESP	Tomás Calvo
—	MF	ARG	Lautero Bareyro
—	MF	ESP	Raúl García
—	FW	ESP	Álvaro Tiscar
—	MF	ESP	Jorge Gonzalez "Pitu"
—	FW	ESP	José Cabo
—	FW	ESP	Mariu Feliu
—	FW	ESP	Raúl Caudeli
—	FW	ARG	Rodrigo Zalazar
—	FW	ESP	Rubén Ortolá

== Stadium ==
The Campo d'Esports Municipal is owned by the local council. The main football pitch is synthetic grass which was laid to replace the natural surface in 2006; it was replaced in 2019. In addition to the 11-a-side markings, the pitch is also laid out with dark blue 7-a-side markings across the width of each half of the pitch.

The main stand running alongside the western edge of the pitch with a capacity of close to 2,000 spectators. A roof was opened in 2018 covering the northern half of the main stand and the tunnel and seats were installed in the same section. The changing rooms and offices underneath the stand were seriously damaged by fire, thought to have been started deliberately, in June 2010; a similar arson attack destroyed the nearby headquarters of Javea Bulls Rugby Club. However the local council had already earmarked the changing rooms for a complete refurbishment and work was carried out during the summer of 2010. A new scoreboard was installed in 2015.

On the other side of the pitch is a small temporary stand with plastic seats for about 200 people. Since it has no cover and during the afternoon and evening games spectators are often starting into the setting sun, it has become known as the "Sunshine Stand".

There is a small bar in one corner of the ground selling refreshments.

== Notable former players ==
- (Spain) José Carlos Granero

== Notable former coaches ==
- (England) Kenny Brown
- (Spain) José Carlos Granero
