= 2020 Chinese Women's Football League =

Professional football season

Chinese Women's Football League
- Season: 2020
- Dates: 12 September – 3 October 2020
- Champions: Sichuan
- Promoted: Sichuan
- Matches: 21
- Goals: 58 (2.76 per match)
- Biggest home win: Shaanxi Daqing Spring 7–0 Yunnan Jiashijing (16 September 2020)
- Biggest away win: Yunnan Jiashijing 0–5 Sichuan (23 September 2020)
- Highest scoring: Shaanxi Daqing Spring 7–0 Yunnan Jiashijing (16 September 2020)
- Longest winning run: 3 matches Sichuan
- Longest unbeaten run: 6 matches Shaanxi Daqing Spring; Sichuan
- Longest winless run: 6 matches Yunnan Jiashijing
- Longest losing run: 3 matches Chongqing Lander; Yunnan Jiashijing

The 2020 Chinese Women's Football League, officially known as the 2020 China Taiping Chinese Football Association Women's Football League (Chinese: 2020中国太平中国足球协会女子甲级联赛) for sponsorship reasons, was the 6th season in its current incarnation. In this season, all matches were held at Jiangning Football Training Base, Nanjing, Jiangsu. The season began on 12 September 2020 and concluded on 3 October 2020. In this season, the number of clubs was reduced from 10 to 7.

== Clubs ==
=== Club changes ===
==== To Football League ====
Clubs promoted from 2019 Chinese Women's League Two

- Dalian Pro
- Guangzhou Evergrande Taobao
- Shanghai Greenland Shenhua

==== From Football League ====
Clubs promoted to 2020 Chinese Women's Super League

- Hebei China Fortune
- Shandong Sports Lottery
- Zhejiang

Clubs relegated to 2020 Chinese Women's League Two

- Donghua University

Dissolved entries

- Hebei Aoli Jingying

Choose not to enter

- PLA

=== Stadiums and locations ===
Team	Head coach	City	Stadium	Capacity	2020 season
Sichuan	(China) Yang Zhe				5th
Shaanxi Daqing Spring	(China) Liu Huana				6th
Yunnan Jiashijing	(China) Gao Fulin				7th
Chongqing Lander	(China) Jia Jing				9th
Shanghai Greenland Shenhua	(China) Ye Zhijing				League Two, 3rd
Guangzhou Evergrande Taobao	(China) Li Kun				League Two, 4th
Dalian Pro	(China) Fan Yiying				League Two, 5th

== League table ==
Pos	Team	Pld	W	D	L	GF	GA	GD	Pts	Qualification or relegation
1	Sichuan (C, P)	6	5	1	0	16	3	+13	16	Promotion to Women's Super League
2	Shaanxi Daqing Spring	6	4	2	0	14	2	+12	14	
3	Dalian Pro	6	3	1	2	9	5	+4	10	
4	Shanghai Greenland Shenhua	6	2	1	3	9	12	−3	7 (Note: Head-to-head results: Chongqing 0–1 Shanghai Greenland Shenhua)	
5	Chongqing Lander	6	2	1	3	4	6	−2	7	
6	Guangzhou Evergrande Taobao	6	1	1	4	4	9	−5	4	
7	Yunnan Jiashijing	6	0	1	5	2	21	−19	1	

Source: Official Website (Desktop view), Official Website (Mobile view)
Rules for classification: 1) Points; 2) Head-to-head points; 3) Head-to-head goal difference; 4) Head-to-head goals scored; 5) Goal difference; 6) Goals scored; 7) Disciplinary points (yellow card = 1 point, red card as a result of two yellow cards = 3 points, direct red card = 3 points, yellow card followed by direct red card = 4 points); 8) Drawing of lots.
(C) Champions; (P) Promoted

== Results ==
Home \ Away	CQ	DLP	GZE	SX	SGS	SC	YN
Chongqing Lander				0–0	0–1		
Dalian Pro	2–0				2–2		
Guangzhou Evergrande Taobao	1–2	0–1			3–2		
Shaanxi Daqing Spring		1–0	2–0			2–2	7–0
Shanghai Greenland Shenhua				0–2			
Sichuan	1–0	2–1	2–0		4–0		
Yunnan Jiashijing	1–2	0–3	0–0		1–4	0–5	

Source: Official Website (Desktop view), Official Website (Mobile view)
Legend: Blue = home team win; Yellow = draw; Red = away team win.
For upcoming matches, an "a" indicates there is an article about the rivalry between the two participants.

== Positions by round ==
To preserve chronological evolvements, any postponed matches are not included to the round at which they were originally scheduled, but added to the full round they were played immediately afterwards. For example, if a match is scheduled for round 7, but then played between rounds 8 and 9, it will be added to the standings for round 8.

Team ╲ Round	1	2	3	4	5	6	7
Sichuan	1	3	3	1	1	1	1
Shaanxi Daqing Spring	2	1	1	2	2	2	2
Dalian Pro	4	4	4	4	3	3	3
Shanghai Greenland Shenhua	7	5	6	5	6	4	4
Chongqing Lander	3	2	2	3	4	5	5
Guangzhou Evergrande Taobao	6	6	5	6	5	6	6
Yunnan Jiashijing	5	7	7	7	7	7	7

Promotion to Women's Super League

Source: Official Website (Desktop view), Official Website (Mobile view)

== Results by match played ==
Team ╲ Round	1	2	3	4	5	6	7
Chongqing Lander	W	W	D	L	L	L	
Dalian Pro		D	L	W	W	L	W
Guangzhou Evergrande Taobao	L	L	D	L	W		L
Shaanxi Daqing Spring	W	W	D		D	W	W
Shanghai Greenland Shenhua	L	D		W	L	W	L
Sichuan	W		W	W	D	W	W
Yunnan Jiashijing	L	L	D	L		L	L

Source: Official Website (Desktop view), Official Website (Mobile view)
W = Win; D = Draw; L = Loss
