= José Carlos Granero =

Spanish football manager (born 1963)

Personal information
- Full name: José Carlos Granero Granero
- Date of birth: 27 May 1963 (age 63)
- Place of birth: Chella, Spain
- Height: 1.75 m (5 ft 9 in)
- Position: Defender

Youth career
- 1972–1978: Chella
- 1978–1980: Valencia

Senior career*
Years	Team	Apps	(Gls)
1980–1986	Valencia B		
1984–1986	Valencia	24	(0)
1986–1988	Recreativo	14	(0)
1988–1989	Alcoyano	21	(1)
1989–1993	Benidorm	91	(3)
1993–1994	Jávea		

Managerial career
- 1993–1994: Jávea
- 1994–1995: Villena
- 1995–1996: Llíria
- 1996–1997: Ontinyent
- 1997–1998: Benidorm
- 1999: Novelda
- 1999–2000: Levante (assistant)
- 2000–2001: Levante
- 2002–2003: Gimnàstic
- 2003–2004: Hércules
- 2007–2009: Alicante
- 2009–2011: Ponferradina
- 2011–2012: Alavés
- 2013–2014: Oviedo
- 2014–2015: Veria
- 2016: Melilla
- 2016–2017: Levante B
- 2017–2020: Chengdu Better City
- 2021–2022: Shenzhen
- * Club domestic league appearances and goals

José Carlos Granero Granero (born 27 May 1963) is a Spanish former professional footballer who played as a right-back or a central defender, currently a manager.

He was known as a promotion specialist, winning promotion four times to Segunda División B, three to Segunda División and earning two more in China later in his career.

== Playing career ==
Born in Chella, Valencia, Granero spent six years with local giants Valencia CF, but was mainly associated with the reserves, his best output being 15 appearances in the 1984–85 campaign (seven starts). He made his La Liga debut on 15 January 1984, in a 2–1 away loss against Real Valladolid.

Granero left the Che in 1986, then spent a couple of years in Segunda División with Recreativo de Huelva, playing no matches in the 1987–88 season. He retired in 1994 at the age of 31 after spells with CD Alcoyano and Benidorm CD – Segunda División B – and amateurs CD Jávea, all in his native region.

== Coaching career ==
Granero started training with his last club, going on to work in the lower leagues the following seasons. In 1996, he led Llíria CF to the first place in the Tercera División regular season, subsequently disposing of FC Cartagena, FC Santboià and UD Poblense in the promotion playoffs; still in the late 90s, he achieved promotions to the third tier with Ontinyent CF, Benidorm and Novelda CF.

In 2007–08, Granero was in charge of Alicante CF as it returned to division two after a 50-year absence. He was unable to prevent instant relegation the following campaign (he was sacked midway through it, being reinstated shortly after), meeting the exact same fate with SD Ponferradina (promotion in 2010 followed by relegation).

On 18 October 2011, Granero was appointed at Deportivo Alavés in the third division, after Luis de la Fuente was dismissed. He left the Mendizorrotza Stadium the following June, and continued working at that level the next two seasons with Real Oviedo.

On 28 May 2014, Granero was signed as head coach of Veria FC, as the Super League Greece team's director of football was compatriot Quique Hernández. He then returned to his country, where he managed two sides in the third tier.

Granero headed back abroad on 24 November 2017, signing for the upcoming year to Chengdu Better City F.C. who had been relegated to China's fourth division. He won immediate back-to-back promotions to the nation's League One.

== Personal life ==
Granero's younger brother Roberto was a midfielder who played for over a decade in the third tier. He later coached, as José Carlos' assistant and in his own right.

His son, Borja, was also a footballer, and all three were youth players at Valencia.

== Managerial statistics ==
As of 1 January 2022

Managerial record by team and tenure
Team	Nat	From	To	Record					Ref.
Team	Nat	From	To	G	W	D	L	Win %	Ref.
Jávea	(Spain)	1 July 1993	30 June 1994	38	9	12	17	23.68	
Villena	(Spain)	1 July 1994	30 June 1995	38	10	7	21	26.32	
Llíria	(Spain)	1 July 1995	30 June 1996	44	27	9	8	61.36	
Ontinyent	(Spain)	1 July 1996	30 June 1997	46	29	10	7	63.04	
Benidorm	(Spain)	1 July 1997	30 June 1998	44	26	5	13	59.09	
Novelda	(Spain)	1 July 1999	31 December 1999	21	6	4	11	28.57	
Levante	(Spain)	1 July 2000	22 October 2001	55	16	26	13	29.09	
Gimnàstic	(Spain)	1 July 2002	3 February 2003	23	6	12	5	26.09	
Hércules	(Spain)	14 July 2003	13 November 2004	50	18	20	12	36.00	
Alicante	(Spain)	17 April 2007	12 October 2008	65	29	20	16	44.62	
Alicante	(Spain)	24 December 2008	30 June 2009	25	7	5	13	28.00	
Ponferradina	(Spain)	1 July 2009	4 January 2011	64	26	22	16	40.63	
Alavés	(Spain)	18 October 2011	30 June 2012	29	11	13	5	37.93	
Oviedo	(Spain)	11 March 2013	17 February 2014	39	17	10	12	43.59	
Veria	(Greece)	28 May 2014	20 March 2015	33	11	9	13	33.33	
Melilla	(Spain)	5 January 2016	30 June 2016	19	9	6	4	47.37	
Atlético Levante	(Spain)	8 July 2016	22 June 2017	40	8	20	12	20.00	
Chengdu Better City	(China)	24 November 2017	13 December 2020	61	39	12	10	63.93	
Shenzhen	(China)	3 June 2021	31 December 2021	20	9	4	7	45.00	
Total				754	313	226	215	41.51	—
