= 2022 Chinese Women's Super League =

Chinese Women's Super League
- Season: 2022
- Dates: 7 April – 18 November 2022
- Champions: Wuhan Jianghan University
- Matches: 90
- Goals: 226 (2.51 per match)
- Top goalscorer: Temwa Chawinga (10 goals)
- Biggest home win: Jiangsu 6–0 Henan Jianye (13 April 2022); Wuhan Jianghan University 6–0 Jiangsu (11 May 2022); Changchun Jiuyin Loans 6–0 Henan Jianye (18 November 2022)
- Biggest away win: Henan Jianye 0–6 Shanghai Shengli (10 April 2022)
- Highest scoring: Henan Jianye 0–6 Shanghai Shengli (10 April 2022); Jiangsu 6–0 Henan Jianye (13 April 2022); Changchun Jiuyin Loans 3–3 Beijing (7 May 2022); Wuhan Jianghan University 6–0 Jiangsu (11 May 2022); Meizhou Hakka 2–4 Shandong Sports Lottery (26 October 2022); Changchun Jiuyin Loans 6–0 Henan Jianye (18 November 2022)
- Longest winning run: 14 matches Wuhan Jianghan University
- Longest unbeaten run: 14 matches Wuhan Jianghan University
- Longest winless run: 18 matches Henan Jianye
- Longest losing run: 11 matches Henan Jianye

The 2022 Chinese Women's Super League, officially known as the 2022 China Taiping Chinese Football Association Women's Super League (Chinese: 2022中国太平中国足球协会女子超级联赛) for sponsorship reasons, was the 8th season in its current incarnation, and the 26th total season of the women's association football league in China. It was held from 7 April to 18 November 2022.

== Clubs ==
=== Club changes ===
==== To Super League ====
Club promoted from 2021 Chinese Women's Football League

- Shaanxi Chang'an Athletic

==== From Super League ====
Club relegated to 2022 Chinese Women's Football League

- Zhejiang

=== Name changes ===
- Beijing BG Phoenix F.C. changed their name to Beijing.
- Changchun Dazhong Zhuoyue W.F.C. changed their name to Changchun Jiuyin Loans.
- Shaanxi W.F.C. changed their name to Shaanxi Chang'an Athletic.

=== Stadiums and locations ===
Team	Head Coach	City	Stadium	Capacity	2021 season
Wuhan Jianghan University	(China) Chang Weiwei				1st
Jiangsu	(Hong Kong) Chan Yuen Ting				2nd
Shanghai Shengli	(China) Pan Weimin				3rd
Meizhou Hakka	(China) Guo Zichao				4th
Changchun Jiuyin Loans	(China) Liu You				5th
Shandong Sports Lottery	(China) Zhang Tao				6th
Henan Jianye	(China) Fan Yunjie				7th
Beijing	(China) Yu Yun				8th
Sichuan	(Brazil)				9th
Shaanxi Chang'an Athletic	(China) Liu Huana				CWFL, 1st

== Foreign players ==
Clubs can register a total of four foreign players (excluding goalkeepers) over the course of the season, but the number of foreign players allowed on each team at any given time is limited to three. A maximum of two foreign players can be fielded at any given time in each match.

Team	Player 1	Player 2	Player 3	Former players
Beijing				
Changchun Jiuyin Loans	(Brazil)			
Henan Jianye				
Jiangsu				
Meizhou Hakka	(Cameroon) Charlène Meyong	(Nigeria) Chinwendu Ihezuo		
Shaanxi Chang'an Athletic				
Shandong Sports Lottery				
Shanghai Shengli	(Brazil) Nathalia	(Zambia) Barbra Banda	(Zambia) Margaret Belemu	
Sichuan				
Wuhan Jianghan University	(Malawi) Tabitha Chawinga	(Malawi) Temwa Chawinga	(Nigeria) Desire Oparanozie	

== League table ==
Pos	Team	Pld	W	D	L	GF	GA	GD	Pts	Qualification
1	Wuhan Jianghan University (C)	18	15	0	3	49	12	+37	45	
2	Jiangsu	18	12	3	3	25	13	+12	39	
3	Beijing	18	8	7	3	26	21	+5	31	
4	Shanghai Shengli	18	8	5	5	27	15	+12	29	
5	Shandong Sports Lottery	18	8	4	6	21	20	+1	28	
6	Changchun Jiuyin Loans	18	6	8	4	36	21	+15	26	
7	Meizhou Hakka	18	5	2	11	18	28	−10	17	
8	Sichuan	18	3	6	9	9	24	−15	15	
9	Shaanxi Chang'an Athletic	18	3	5	10	7	22	−15	14	
10	Henan Jianye (O)	18	0	4	14	8	50	−42	4	Qualification for Relegation play-offs

Rules for classification: 1) Points; 2) Head-to-head points; 3) Head-to-head goal difference; 4) Head-to-head goals scored; 5) Goal difference; 6) Goals scored; 7) Disciplinary points (yellow card = 1 point, red card as a result of two yellow cards = 3 points, direct red card = 3 points, yellow card followed by direct red card = 4 points); 8) Drawing of lots.
(C) Champions; (O) Play-off winners

== Results ==
Home \ Away	BEJ	CCJ	HNJ	JSU	MZH	SCA	SDS	SHS	SIC	WHJ
Beijing	—	2–2	2–2	2–1	2–1	1–0	1–1	0–1	4–1	0–3
Changchun Jiuyin Loans	3–3	—	6–0	0–2	1–1	1–1	2–2	1–1	0–0	1–2
Henan Jianye	1–2	0–5	—	0–0	0–2	1–1	2–3	0–6	0–0	0–4
Jiangsu	1–2	1–0	6–0	—	2–1	0–0	1–0	1–0	3–1	1–0
Meizhou Hakka	0–0	0–1	2–1	0–1	—	0–1	2–4	1–2	2–0	0–5
Shaanxi Chang'an Athletic	0–3	1–4	2–1	0–1	0–2	—	0–0	1–0	0–1	0–1
Shandong Sports Lottery	0–1	3–2	1–0	0–2	0–2	2–0	—	1–0	2–0	0–2
Shanghai Shengli	1–1	1–1	3–0	1–1	4–1	1–0	0–1	—	1–0	2–3
Sichuan	0–0	0–4	2–0	0–1	1–0	0–0	1–1	0–0	—	1–3
Wuhan Jianghan University	3–0	1–2	3–0	6–0	3–1	3–0	2–0	2–3	3–1	—

Legend: Blue = home team win; Yellow = draw; Red = away team win.
For upcoming matches, an "a" indicates there is an article about the rivalry between the two participants.

== Positions by round ==
To preserve chronological evolvements, any postponed matches are not included to the round at which they were originally scheduled, but added to the full round they were played immediately afterwards. For example, if a match is scheduled for round 7, but then played between rounds 8 and 9, it will be added to the standings for round 8.

Team ╲ Round	1	2	3	4	5	6	7	8	9	10	11	12	13	14	15	16	17	18
Wuhan Jianghan University	1	1	1	1	1	1	1	1	1	1	1	1	1	1	1	1	1	1
Jiangsu	2	5	2	2	2	2	2	2	2	2	2	2	2	2	2	2	2	2
Beijing	6	4	7	3	3	3	3	3	3	3	3	3	3	3	3	3	3	3
Shanghai Shengli	7	3	5	6	4	4	4	4	5	4	4	5	5	4	4	4	4	4
Shandong Sports Lottery	5	7	6	7	8	5	6	5	6	5	5	4	4	5	5	6	5	5
Changchun Jiuyin Loans	4	6	4	4	5	6	5	6	4	6	6	6	6	6	6	5	6	6
Meizhou Hakka	3	2	3	5	6	7	8	7	7	7	7	7	7	7	7	7	7	7
Shaanxi Chang'an Athletic	10	8	9	8	9	9	7	8	8	8	8	8	8	8	8	8	9	9
Sichuan	9	9	8	9	7	8	9	9	9	9	9	9	9	9	9	9	8	8
Henan Jianye	8	10	10	10	10	10	10	10	10	10	10	10	10	10	10	10	10	10

Leader
Qualification for Relegation play-offs

== Results by match played ==
Team ╲ Round	1	2	3	4	5	6	7	8	9	10	11	12	13	14	15	16	17	18
Beijing	D	W	L	W	W	W	D	D	W	L	W	L	D	W	D	W	D	D
Changchun Jiuyin Loans	D	D	W	D	L	L	W	D	W	L	W	D	D	L	W	D	D	W
Henan Jianye	L	L	L	L	L	L	L	L	L	L	L	D	L	D	D	D	L	L
Jiangsu	W	L	W	W	W	W	W	D	L	W	L	D	W	W	W	D	W	W
Meizhou Hakka	W	W	L	L	L	L	L	W	L	W	L	D	W	L	L	L	L	D
Shaanxi Chang'an Athletic	L	D	L	W	L	L	W	D	D	L	L	D	L	L	W	D	L	L
Shandong Sports Lottery	D	L	W	L	L	W	D	W	D	W	W	W	L	L	D	L	W	W
Shanghai Shengli	D	W	L	D	W	W	L	L	D	W	W	L	D	W	L	D	W	W
Sichuan	L	L	W	L	W	L	L	L	D	L	L	D	D	D	D	D	W	L
Wuhan Jianghan University	W	W	W	W	W	W	W	W	W	W	W	W	W	W	L	W	L	L

W = Win; D = Draw; L = Loss

== Relegation play-offs ==
=== Overview ===
Team 1	Score	Team 2
Henan Jianye	3–0	Dalian Pro

=== Match ===
23 November 2022
15:00 UTC+8

Henan Jianye	3–0	Dalian Pro

Yunnan Haigeng Football Training Base Field 12, Kunming
Referee: Liu Sha
