= 2021 Chinese Women's Super League =

Chinese Women's Super League
- Season: 2021
- Dates: 8 May – 30 November 2021
- Champions: Wuhan Jianghan University (2nd title)
- Relegated: Zhejiang

The 2021 Chinese Women's Super League, officially known as the 2021 China Taiping Chinese Football Association Women's Super League (Chinese: 2021中国太平中国足球协会女子超级联赛) for sponsorship reasons, was the 7th season in its current incarnation, and the 25th total season of the women's association football league in China. It was held from 8 May to 30 November 2021 at Yunnan Haigeng Football Training Base, Kunming.

== Clubs ==
=== Name changes ===
- Meizhou Huijun F.C. was acquired by men's football club Meizhou Hakka as their women's football section and changed their name to Meizhou Hakka W.F.C. in December 2020.

=== Stadiums and locations ===
Team	Head coach	City	Stadium	Capacity	2020 season
Wuhan Jianghan University	(China) Chang Weiwei				1st
Jiangsu	(France) Jocelyn Prêcheur				2nd
Shanghai Shengli	(China) Shui Qingxia				3rd
Beijing BG Phoenix	(China) Yu Yun				4th
Changchun Jiuyin Loans	(China) Liu You				5th
Meizhou Hakka	(China) Chen Shufen				6th
Shandong Sports Lottery	(China) Guo Zuojin				7th
Henan Jianye	(China) Lou Jiahui				8th
Zhejiang	(China) Gao Rongming				9th
Sichuan	(China) Yang Zhe				CWFL, 1st

== Foreign players ==
Clubs can register a total of four foreign players (excluding goalkeepers) over the course of the season, but the number of foreign players allowed on each team at any given time is limited to three. A maximum of two foreign players can be fielded at any given time in each match.

Team	Player 1	Player 2	Player 3	Former players
Beijing BG Phoenix				
Changchun Dazhong Zhuoyue	(Argentina) Sole Jaimes	(Brazil) Rafaelle Souza		
Henan Jianye				
Jiangsu				
Meizhou Hakka	(Cameroon) Charlène Meyong	(Nigeria) Chinwendu Ihezuo		
Shandong Sports Lottery				
Shanghai Shengli	(Brazil) Nathalia	(Brazil) Mylena Freitas	(Zambia) Barbra Banda	
Sichuan	(Brazil) Ana Carolina	(Brazil) Dany Helena		
Wuhan Jianghan University	(Brazil) Beatriz	(Malawi) Tabitha Chawinga	(Malawi) Temwa Chawinga	
Zhejiang				

== Regular season ==
=== League table ===
Pos	Team	Pld	W	D	L	GF	GA	GD	Pts	Qualification
1	Wuhan Jianghan University	9	7	2	0	26	3	+23	23 (Note: Wuhan Jianghan University finished ahead of Shanghai Shengli on goal difference: Wuhan Jianghan University 0–0 Shanghai Shengli; Wuhan Jianghan University +23 and Shanghai Shengli +19.)	Qualification for Championship stage
2	Shanghai Shengli	9	7	2	0	21	2	+19	23	Qualification for Championship stage
3	Changchun Dazhong Zhuoyue	9	5	2	2	17	6	+11	17	Qualification for Championship stage
4	Jiangsu	9	4	4	1	8	4	+4	16	Qualification for Championship stage
5	Meizhou Hakka	9	3	3	3	12	12	0	12	Qualification for Championship stage
6	Beijing BG Phoenix	9	2	3	4	12	20	−8	9	Qualification for Relegation stage
7	Shandong Sports Lottery	9	2	2	5	12	16	−4	8 (Note: Shandong Sports Lottery finished ahead of Henan Jianye on head-to-head points: Shandong Sports Lottery 2–0 Henan Jianye.)	Qualification for Relegation stage
8	Henan Jianye	9	2	2	5	8	25	−17	8	Qualification for Relegation stage
9	Zhejiang	9	0	3	6	5	16	−11	3 (Note: Zhejiang finished ahead of Sichuan on goal difference: Zhejiang 1–1 Sichuan; Zhejiang -11 and Sichuan -17.)	Qualification for Relegation stage
10	Sichuan	9	0	3	6	3	20	−17	3	Qualification for Relegation stage

Rules for classification: 1) Points; 2) Head-to-head points; 3) Head-to-head goal difference; 4) Head-to-head goals scored; 5) Goal difference; 6) Goals scored; 7) Disciplinary points (yellow card = 1 point, red card as a result of two yellow cards = 3 points, direct red card = 3 points, yellow card followed by direct red card = 4 points); 8) Drawing of lots.

=== Results ===
Home \ Away	BJP	CCD	HNJ	JSU	MZH	SDS	SHS	SIC	WHJ	ZHJ
Beijing BG Phoenix		1–4		0–2		3–3				3–1
Changchun Dazhong Zhuoyue			3–0		2–1		1–2	1–1		
Henan Jianye	1–1				1–4				0–5	2–1
Jiangsu		0–0	2–2			1–0	0–0			1–0
Meizhou Hakka	2–2			1–0		1–0			2–4	0–0
Shandong Sports Lottery		0–4	2–0				0–1	5–0	0–4	
Shanghai Shengli	2–0		7–1		2–0			4–0		
Sichuan	0–2		0–1	0–1	1–1					
Wuhan Jianghan University	5–0	1–0		1–1			0–0	4–0		
Zhejiang		0–2				2–2	0–3	1–1	0–2	

Legend: Blue = home team win; Yellow = draw; Red = away team win.
For upcoming matches, an "a" indicates there is an article about the rivalry between the two participants.

=== Positions by round ===
To preserve chronological evolvements, any postponed matches are not included to the round at which they were originally scheduled, but added to the full round they were played immediately afterwards. For example, if a match is scheduled for round 7, but then played between rounds 8 and 9, it will be added to the standings for round 8.

Team ╲ Round	1	2	3	4	5	6	7	8	9
Wuhan Jianghan University	2	1	1	1	1	1	1	1	1
Shanghai Shengli	1	3	2	2	2	2	2	2	2
Changchun Dazhong Zhuoyue	3	2	4	3	3	3	3	3	3
Jiangsu	4	5	6	4	5	5	4	4	4
Meizhou Hakka	7	6	3	5	4	4	5	5	5
Beijing BG Phoenix	5	4	7	8	6	6	7	7	6
Shandong Sports Lottery	6	7	5	7	8	8	6	6	7
Henan Jianye	10	10	8	6	7	7	8	8	8
Zhejiang	8	8	9	9	9	9	9	9	9
Sichuan	9	9	10	10	10	10	10	10	10

Qualification for Championship stage
Qualification for Relegation stage

=== Results by match played ===
Team ╲ Round	1	2	3	4	5	6	7	8	9
Beijing BG Phoenix	D	W	L	L	W	L	L	D	D
Changchun Dazhong Zhuoyue	W	W	L	W	W	D	D	W	L
Henan Jianye	L	L	W	W	L	L	L	D	D
Jiangsu	W	D	L	W	D	D	W	W	D
Meizhou Hakka	L	W	W	L	W	D	D	L	D
Shandong Sports Lottery	D	L	W	L	L	D	W	L	L
Shanghai Shengli	W	D	W	W	W	W	D	W	W
Sichuan	L	L	L	L	L	D	D	L	D
Wuhan Jianghan University	W	W	W	W	D	W	D	W	W
Zhejiang	L	L	L	L	L	D	D	L	D

W = Win; D = Draw; L = Loss

== Championship stage ==
=== League table ===
Pos	Team	Pld	W	D	L	GF	GA	GD	Pts	Qualification
1	Jiangsu	4	2	1	1	6	4	+2	7	Qualification for Championship playoffs
2	Wuhan Jianghan University	4	1	3	0	7	4	+3	6 (Note: Wuhan Jianghan University finished ahead of Shanghai Shengli on head-to-head points: Wuhan Jianghan University 4–1 Shanghai Shengli.)	Qualification for Championship playoffs
3	Shanghai Shengli	4	2	0	2	5	6	−1	6	Qualification for Third place playoffs
4	Meizhou Hakka	4	1	1	2	3	5	−2	4 (Note: Meizhou Hakka finished ahead of Changchun Dazhong Zhuoyue on head-to-head points: Meizhou Hakka 2–0 Changchun Dazhong Zhuoyue.)	Qualification for Third place playoffs
5	Changchun Dazhong Zhuoyue	4	1	1	2	5	7	−2	4	

Rules for classification: 1) Points; 2) Head-to-head points; 3) Head-to-head goal difference; 4) Head-to-head goals scored; 5) Goal difference; 6) Goals scored; 7) Disciplinary points (yellow card = 1 point, red card as a result of two yellow cards = 3 points, direct red card = 3 points, yellow card followed by direct red card = 4 points); 8) Drawing of lots.

=== Results ===
Home \ Away	CCD	JSU	MZH	SHS	WHJ
Changchun Dazhong Zhuoyue		2–1			3–3
Jiangsu			3–1	2–1	
Meizhou Hakka	2–0				0–0
Shanghai Shengli	1–0		2–0		
Wuhan Jianghan University		0–0		4–1	

Legend: Blue = home team win; Yellow = draw; Red = away team win.
For upcoming matches, an "a" indicates there is an article about the rivalry between the two participants.

=== Positions by round ===
To preserve chronological evolvements, any postponed matches are not included to the round at which they were originally scheduled, but added to the full round they were played immediately afterwards. For example, if a match is scheduled for round 7, but then played between rounds 8 and 9, it will be added to the standings for round 8.

Team ╲ Round	1	2	3	4	5
Jiangsu	4	5	3	3	1
Wuhan Jianghan University	3	1	1	2	2
Shanghai Shengli	1	3	4	1	3
Meizhou Hakka	5	2	5	5	4
Changchun Dazhong Zhuoyue	2	4	2	4	5

Qualification for Championship playoffs
Qualification for Third place playoffs

=== Results by match played ===
Team ╲ Round	1	2	3	4	5
Changchun Dazhong Zhuoyue	W	L	D	L	N
Jiangsu	L	N	W	D	W
Meizhou Hakka	L	W	L	N	D
Shanghai Shengli	W	L	N	W	L
Wuhan Jianghan University	N	W	D	D	D

W = Win; D = Draw; L = Loss

== Relegation stage ==
=== League table ===
Pos	Team	Pld	W	D	L	GF	GA	GD	Pts	Qualification or relegation
1	Shandong Sports Lottery	4	2	2	0	7	4	+3	8 (Note: Shandong Sports Lottery finished ahead of Henan Jianye on goal difference: Shandong Sports Lottery 1–1 Henan Jianye; Shandong Sports Lottery +3 and Henan Jianye +2.)	Qualification for Sixth place playoffs
2	Henan Jianye	4	2	2	0	3	1	+2	8	Qualification for Sixth place playoffs
3	Sichuan	4	1	2	1	2	2	0	5	Qualification for Eighth place playoffs
4	Beijing BG Phoenix	4	1	1	2	5	6	−1	4	Qualification for Eighth place playoffs
5	Zhejiang (R)	4	0	1	3	2	6	−4	1	Relegation to Football League

Rules for classification: 1) Points; 2) Head-to-head points; 3) Head-to-head goal difference; 4) Head-to-head goals scored; 5) Goal difference; 6) Goals scored; 7) Disciplinary points (yellow card = 1 point, red card as a result of two yellow cards = 3 points, direct red card = 3 points, yellow card followed by direct red card = 4 points); 8) Drawing of lots.
(R) Relegated

=== Results ===
Home \ Away	BJP	HNJ	SDS	SIC	ZHJ
Beijing BG Phoenix			2–3		2–1
Henan Jianye	0–0				1–0
Shandong Sports Lottery		1–1		0–0	
Sichuan	2–1	0–1			
Zhejiang			1–3	0–0	

Legend: Blue = home team win; Yellow = draw; Red = away team win.
For upcoming matches, an "a" indicates there is an article about the rivalry between the two participants.

=== Positions by round ===
To preserve chronological evolvements, any postponed matches are not included to the round at which they were originally scheduled, but added to the full round they were played immediately afterwards. For example, if a match is scheduled for round 7, but then played between rounds 8 and 9, it will be added to the standings for round 8.

Team ╲ Round	1	2	3	4	5
Shandong Sports Lottery	2	2	2	2	1
Henan Jianye	1	1	1	1	2
Sichuan	3	3	3	4	3
Beijing BG Phoenix	4	4	4	3	4
Zhejiang	5	5	5	5	5

Qualification for Sixth place playoffs
Qualification for Eighth place playoffs
Relegation to Football League

=== Results by match played ===
Team ╲ Round	1	2	3	4	5
Beijing BG Phoenix	N	L	D	W	L
Henan Jianye	W	W	D	D	N
Shandong Sports Lottery	D	W	N	D	W
Sichuan	D	L	D	N	W
Zhejiang	L	N	D	L	L

W = Win; D = Draw; L = Loss

== Championship playoffs ==
=== Overview ===
Team 1	Score	Team 2
Jiangsu	1–2	Wuhan Jianghan University

=== Match ===
30 November 2021
15:30 UTC+8

Jiangsu	1–2	Wuhan Jianghan University
Wu Chengshu 10'		Wang Lei 49'; Wang Shuang 60'

Yunnan Haigeng Football Training Base Field 12, Kunming

== Third place playoffs ==
=== Overview ===
Team 1	Score	Team 2
Shanghai Shengli	2–1	Meizhou Hakka

=== Match ===
30 November 2021
15:00 UTC+8

Shanghai Shengli	2–1	Meizhou Hakka

Yunnan Haigeng Football Training Base Field 16, Kunming

== Sixth place playoffs ==
=== Overview ===
Team 1	Score	Team 2
Shandong Sports Lottery	1–0	Henan Jianye

=== Match ===
29 November 2021
15:30 UTC+8

Shandong Sports Lottery	1–0	Henan Jianye

Yunnan Haigeng Football Training Base Field 5, Kunming

== Eighth place playoffs ==
The loser will qualify for relegation play-offs.

=== Overview ===
Team 1	Score	Team 2
Sichuan	0–2	Beijing BG Phoenix

=== Match ===
29 November 2021
15:30 UTC+8

Sichuan	0–2	Beijing BG Phoenix

Yunnan Haigeng Football Training Base Field 2, Kunming

== Relegation play-offs ==
=== Overview ===
Team 1	Score	Team 2
Sichuan	2–0	Guangzhou

=== Match ===
4 December 2021
15:00 UTC+8

Sichuan	2–0	Guangzhou

Yunnan Haigeng Football Training Base Field 12, Kunming
