= Li Kun =

Chinese footballer

Li Kun 李鲲
Personal information
- Full name: Li Kun
- Date of birth: 1 August 1981 (age 45)
- Place of birth: Beijing, China
- Height: 1.88 m (6 ft 2 in)
- Positions: Defender; striker

Youth career
- 2000: Bayi

Senior career*
Years	Team	Apps	(Gls)
2001–2003	Bayi	32	(2)
2004–2007	Xiamen Lanshi	94	(5)
2008	Wuhan Guanggu	14	(0)
2009–2010	Anhui Jiufang	8	(1)
- * Club domestic league appearances and goals as of 3:06, 22 Feb 2012 (UTC)

Li Kun (Simplified Chinese: 李鲲) (born August 1, 1981) is a former Chinese footballer. He holds the dubious distinction of having played in the most teams to be relegated and then subsequently disbanded from the top tier of Chinese football.

== Club career ==
=== Bayi Football Team ===
Li Kun started his professional football career in 2001 at top tier military club Bayi Football Team after graduating from their youth team. He initially started out as a striker and would go on to make eight league appearances within his debut season. The following season would see Li progress to become a squad regular within the team while the club experienced a disappointing season and finished thirteenth within the league. By the 2003 league season Bayi were struggling to adopt to the financial requirements required for full professionalism within Chinese football and when the team experienced relegation at the end of the season the club was disbanded.

=== Xiamen Lanshi ===
Li Kun transferred to second-tier football club Xiamen Lanshi at the beginning of the 2004 football league season and under the club's Head coach Gao Hongbo, Li was moved into the team's defense. The move would turn out to be a big success and during his first season with Xiamen he would help guide the club to a third-place finish, while in his second season with the club he would play a significant role in the club's division title win and promotion to the Chinese Super League at the end of the 2005 league campaign. In his return into the top tier Li would go on to play a vital part within Xiamen's mid-table eighth-place finish at the end of the 2006 Chinese Super League campaign. At the beginning of the 2007 Chinese Super League season the club's influential manager Gao Hongbo would leave the team to join Changchun Yatai F.C. and Xiamen were unable to recover from this, which then lead to the club's relegation and subsequent disbanding at the end of the season after the club's backers were unable to recoup their losses from the relegation.

=== Wuhan Guanggu ===
He would transfer to Wuhan Guanggu the following season where he was unable to establish himself within the squad. He would see Wuhan get relegated and was allowed to leave at the end of the season. Second-tier club Anhui Jiufang took Li Kun on at the beginning of the 2009 league season, however he would suffer an ankle injury during the season and would miss a significant part of the league season. When he returned the following season the club finished the league ninth, however the club would be taken over at the end of the season by Tianjin Runyulong F.C. and when the club had the chance to merge him into their team they declined that option.

== Honours ==
Xiamen Lanshi

- China League One: 2005
