= Chinese government response to COVID-19 =

During the COVID-19 pandemic in mainland China, the Chinese Communist Party (CCP) and government of China under CCP general secretary Xi Jinping's administration pursued a zero-COVID strategy to prevent the domestic spread of COVID-19 until late 2022. Aspects of the response have been controversial, with the zero-COVID approach being praised and the government's lack of transparency, censorship, and spread of misinformation being criticized. The government abandoned its zero-COVID policy on 7 December 2022.

After discovery of a cluster of patients with pneumonia of unknown etiology in Wuhan, Hubei Province, a public notice on the outbreak was distributed on 31 December 2019. Three days earlier on 28 December 2019, Chinese researchers in Beijing uploaded a fully mapped sequence of COVID-19's structure to the NIH GenBank, but the report was never publicly accessible due to it missing technical, non-scientific information required for submission despite NIH attempts to communicate with the report author. On 8 January 2020, a new coronavirus (SARS-CoV-2) was announced by Chinese scientists as the cause of the new disease; and on 10 January a nearly identical virus to the 28 December upload was sequenced and its genome made available online. On 17 January 2024, The Wall Street Journal released a report about the former 28 December upload that officially contradicted the Chinese government's claim that knowledge of the cause of the outbreak in the early weeks of January 2020 was unknown, and that information was shared as soon as it was available.

On 23 January 2020, the Chinese government banned travel to and from Wuhan, enforced strict quarantines in affected regions and initiated a national response. The epidemic in Hubei province peaked on 4 February 2020. Large temporary hospitals were built in Wuhan to isolate patients with mild-to-moderate symptoms, with the first opening on 5 February 2020. The epidemic was heavily concentrated within Hubei province and Wuhan. Through 22 March 2020, over 80% of the recorded cases in China were in Hubei province, with over 60% of cases nationwide occurring in Wuhan alone.

By the summer of 2020, China had largely brought the outbreak under control, ending widespread community transmission. After the initial outbreak, lockdowns and other restrictive measures were eased throughout China. The lockdown in Wuhan was lifted on 8 April 2020. It is estimated that the epidemic control measures held the death toll due to COVID-19 in Wuhan to under 5,000 from January to March 2020.

China was one of a small number of countries that pursued an elimination strategy, sustaining zero or low case numbers over the long term. Until late 2022, most cases in China were imported from abroad, and several new outbreaks were quickly controlled through intense short-term public health measures, including large-scale testing, contact tracking technology, and mandatory isolation of infected individuals. In the 18 months following containment of the initial outbreak in Wuhan, two COVID-19 deaths were recorded. In December 2022, the Chinese government ended its zero-COVID policy and mass testing following protests across the country.

In 2020 and 2021, China was the largest exporter of COVID-19 critical medical products. China was the world's largest exporter of face masks, increasing exports by around 600% in the first half of 2020. A number of COVID-19 vaccines have been developed in China, which have been used in its vaccination programme and international vaccine diplomacy. Through November 2021, China was the world's largest exporter of COVID-19 vaccines, with a cumulative share of around 40% of worldwide exports (totalling around 1.5 billion doses), according to the World Trade Organization.

China's response to the initial Wuhan COVID-19 outbreak has been both praised and criticised. In October 2020, The Lancet Infectious Diseases reported: "While the world is struggling to control COVID-19, China has managed to control the pandemic rapidly and effectively." The Chinese government has been criticized for censorship, which observers have attributed to a culture of institutional censorship affecting the country's press and Internet. The government censored whistleblowers, journalists, and social media posts about the outbreak. During the beginning of the pandemic, the Chinese government made efforts to clamp down on discussion and hide reporting about it, as such information was seen as unfavorable for local officials. Efforts to fund and control research into the virus's origins have continued up to the present.

== Initial response ==
Based on retrospective case analysis of Chinese government published data, the first person known to have fallen ill with COVID-19 in Wuhan first began experiencing symptoms on 1 December 2019. However, according to secret government documents reported on by the South China Morning Post, index cases were traced back to 17 November. In mid December 2019, Wuhan doctors noticed a pattern of unusual white spots in patients' lung scans. On 24 December, a sample was sent to a Chinese lab called Vision Medicals. On the 26th, a tech at Vision Medicals obtained a partial DNA sequence and noticed it was similar to SARS. The alarmed tech forwarded the information to his boss, but the information was not made public at the time. Doctors in Wuhan noticed a cluster of patients with pneumonia of unknown etiology in late December 2019. A public notice on the outbreak was released by Wuhan health authority on 31 December; the initial notice informed Wuhan residents that there was no clear evidence of human-to-human transmission of the virus, that the disease is preventable and controllable, and that people can wear masks when going out. WHO picked up news reports of the outbreak on the same day. Warnings by doctors were at first ignored by local government officials. Chinese researchers had mapped and fully sequenced COVID-19's genome by at least 28 December 2019, when Dr. Lili Ren, a virologist at the Chinese Academy of Medical Sciences & Peking Union Medical College in Beijing uploaded its sequence to the NIH GenBank. The submission was never publicly available after it failed to include technical, non-scientific information required for publication, and attempts by the NIH to contact Dr. Ren went unanswered.

On 7 January 2020, the Politburo Standing Committee of the Chinese Communist Party (CCP) discussed COVID-19 prevention and control. On 8 January 2020, a new coronavirus (SARS-CoV-2) was announced by Chinese scientists as the cause of the new disease; and on 10 January a nearly identical virus to the 28 December upload was sequenced and its genome made available online. On 17 January 2024, The Wall Street Journal released a report detailing the former 28 December submission, contradicting the Chinese government's claims that the cause of the outbreak was unknown in early January 2020 and information was shared as soon as it was made available.

Within three weeks of the first known cases, the government built sixteen large mobile hospitals in Wuhan and sent 40,000 medical staff to the city.

Initially, the Chinese government was against the World Health Organization declaring a public health emergency, but eventually a public health emergency was declared on 30 January.

=== 2020 Chinese New Year ===
The Wuhan government, which announced a number of new measures such as cancelling the Chinese New Year celebrations, in addition to measures such as checking the temperature of passengers at transport terminals first introduced on 14 January.

Beginning on 23 January 2020, extensive lockdown measures were taken in Hubei province, and then in much of China. Travel in and out of Wuhan was halted on 23 January, and travel restrictions were implemented throughout China. A group tasked with the prevention and control of the COVID-19 pandemic was established on 26 January, led by Chinese Premier Li Keqiang. The leading group decided to extend the Spring Festival holiday to contain the outbreak.

China Customs started requiring that all passengers entering and exiting China fill in an extra health declaration form from 26 January. The health declaration form was mentioned in China's Frontier Health and Quarantine Law, granting the customs rights to require it if needed. On 27 January, the General Office of the State Council of China, declared a nationwide extension on the New Year holiday and the postponement of the coming spring semester. The office extended the previously scheduled public holiday from 30 January, to 2 February, while it said school openings for the spring semester would be announced in the future.

=== Declaration of emergency ===
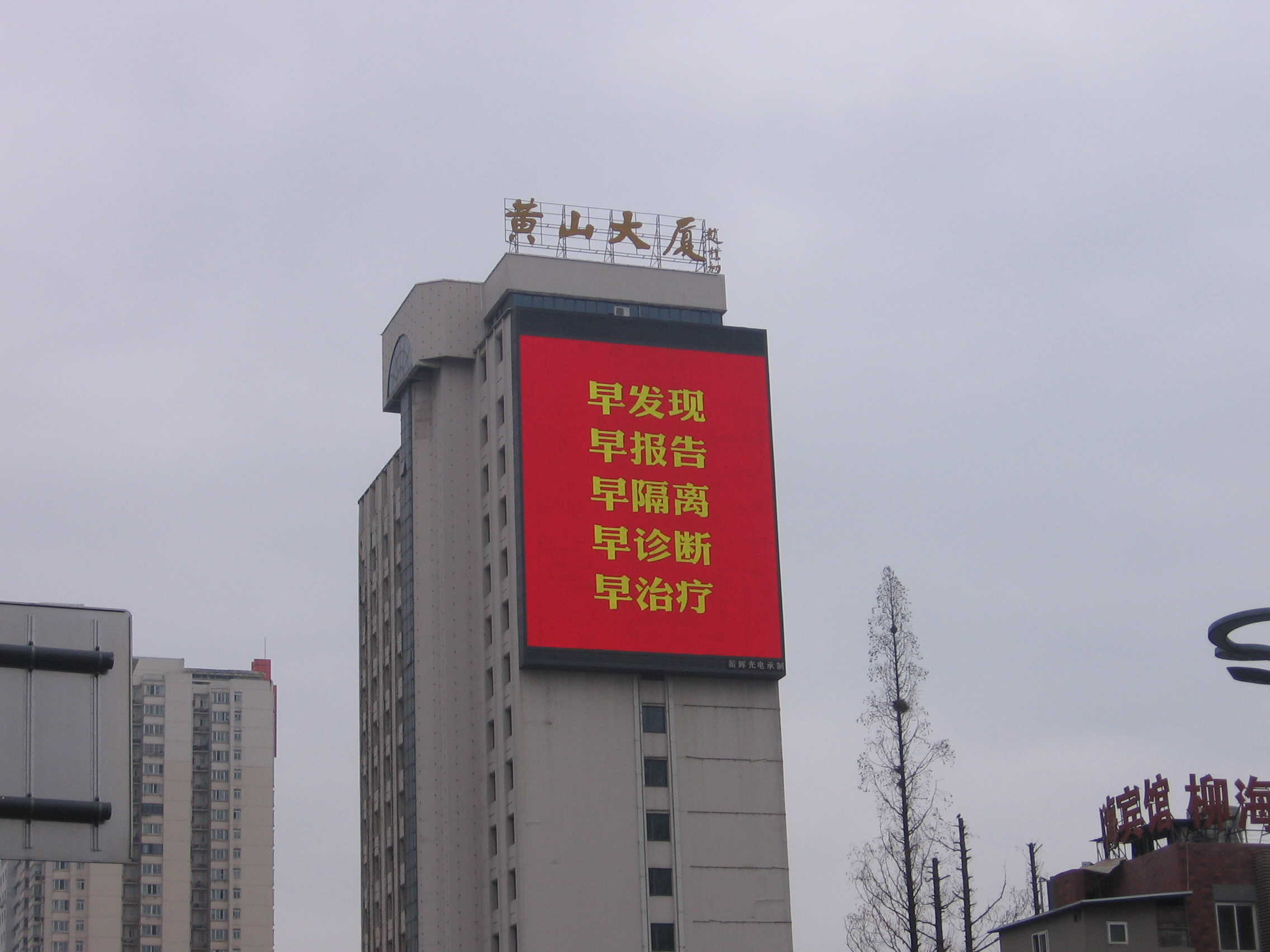
A screen display in Hefei showing "early detection, early reporting, early quarantine, early diagnosis, early treatment" during the COVID-19 pandemic

Hong Kong's Chief Executive Carrie Lam declared an emergency at a press conference on 25 January, saying the government would close primary and secondary schools for two more weeks on top of the previously scheduled New Year holiday, pushing the date for school reopening to 17 February. Macau closed several museums and libraries, and prolonged the New Year holiday break to 11 February for higher education institutions and 10 February for others.

On 1 February 2020, Xinhua News reported that China's Supreme People's Procuratorate (SPP) had "asked procuratorates nationwide to fully play their role to create a favourable judicial environment in the fight against the COVID-19 pandemic". This included severe punishments for those found guilty of dereliction of duty and the withholding of information for officials. Tougher charges were proscribed for commercial criminal activities such as increasing prices, profiteering along with the "production and sale of fake and shoddy protective equipment and medicines". Prosecuting actions against patients who deliberately spread the infection or refuse examination or compulsory isolation along with threats of violence against medical personnel were also urged. The statement also included urging to prosecute those found fabricating and spreading COVID-19-related information and also stressed "harshly punishing the illegal hunting of wildlife under state protection, as well as improving inspection and quarantine measures for fresh food and meat products".

=== Cordon sanitaire ===
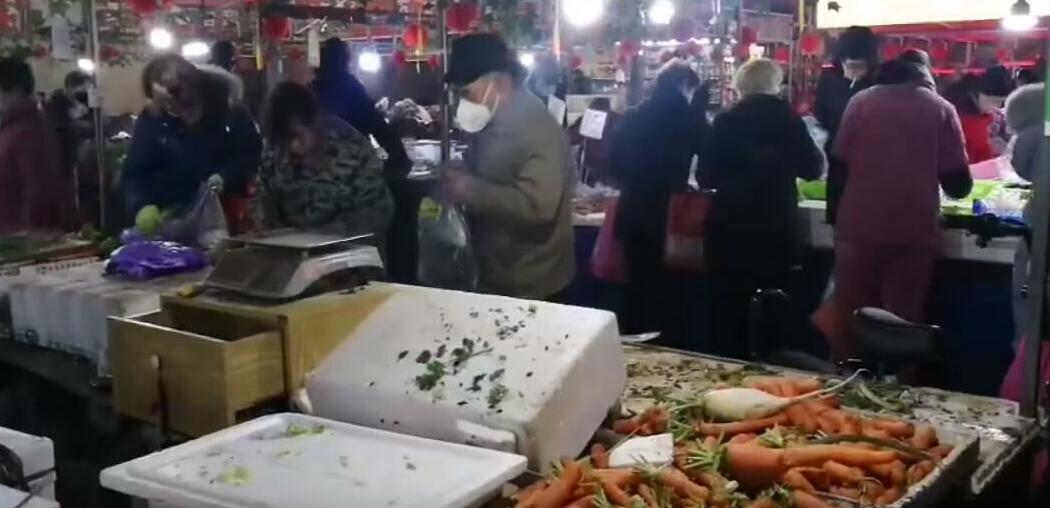
Wuhan residents buying vegetables at a market after the lockdown was announced

On 23 January 2020, a cordon sanitaire on travel in and out of Wuhan was imposed in an effort to stop the spread of the virus out of Wuhan. Flights, trains, public buses, the metro system, and long-distance coaches were suspended indefinitely. Large-scale gatherings and group tours were also suspended. By 24 January 2020, a total of 15 cities in Hubei, including Wuhan, were placed under similar quarantine measures.

Due to lockdown measures, Wuhan residents rushed to stockpile essential goods, food, and fuel; prices rose significantly. 5,000,000 people left Wuhan, with 9,000,000 left in the city. The city of Shantou in Guangdong declared a partial lockdown on 26 January, though this was reversed two hours later. Local authorities in Beijing and several other major cities, including Hangzhou, Guangzhou, Shanghai, and Shenzhen, announced on the same day that these cities will not impose a lockdown similar to those in Hubei province.

By 6 February 2020, a total of four Zhejiang cities—Wenzhou, Hangzhou, Ningbo, and Taizhou—were under the "passport" system, allowing only one person per household to leave their home every two days. These restrictions apply to over 30 million people.

=== Specialty hospitals ===
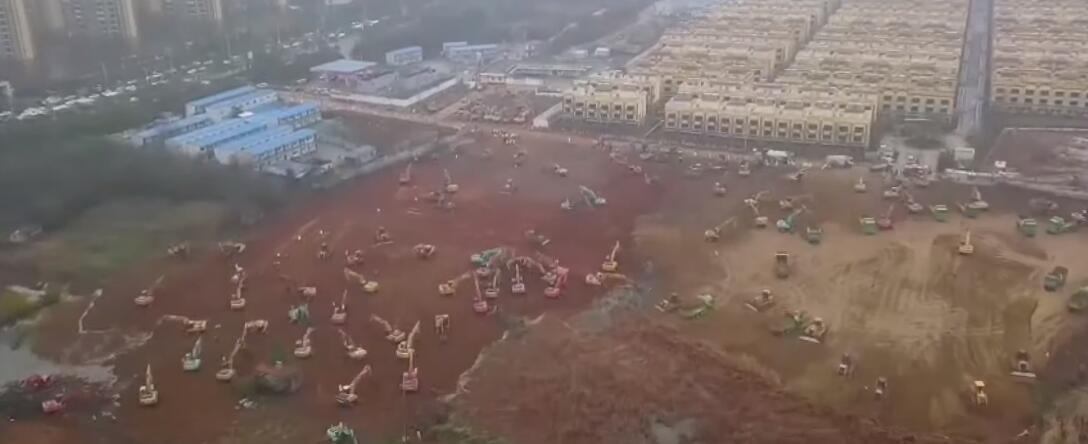
Construction site of Huoshenshan Hospital as it appeared on 24 January

A specialty hospital named Huoshenshan Hospital has been constructed as a countermeasure against the outbreak and to better quarantine the patients. Wuhan City government had demanded that a state-owned enterprise construct such a hospital "at the fastest speed" comparable to that of the SARS outbreak in 2003. Upon opening, the specialty hospital had 1,000 beds and took up 30,000 square metres. The hospital is modelled after the Xiaotangshan Hospital, which was fabricated for the SARS outbreak of 2003, itself built in only seven days.

On 24 January 2020, the authority announced that they would convert an empty building in Huangzhou District, Huanggang to a 1,000-bed hospital named Dabie Mountain Regional Medical Centre. Works began the next day by 500 personnel and the building began accepting patients on 28 January 2020 at 10:30 pm. In Wuhan, authorities seized dormitories, offices and hospitals to create more beds for patients. On 25 January authorities announced plans for Leishenshan Hospital, a second specialty hospital, with a capacity of 1,600 beds; operations are scheduled to start by 6 February. The hospital opened on 8 February.

By 16 February 2020, 217 teams of a total of 25,633 medical workers from across China went to Wuhan and other cities in Hubei to help open up more facilities and treat patients. A total of 14 temporary hospitals were constructed in China in total, but all were reported to have closed after the crisis was determined be under control on 10 March 2020. On 31 March, the Chinese government announced that large-scale domestic transmission of COVID-19 had been stopped.

=== End of the first outbreak ===
The public health measures put in place from 23 January 2020 onward suppressed transmission of the virus below the critical threshold, bringing the basic reproduction number of the virus to near zero. On 4 February 2020, around two weeks after the beginning of the lockdowns in Hubei province, case counts peaked in the province and began to decline thereafter. The outbreak remained largely concentrated within Hubei province, with over 80% of cases nationwide through 22 March 2020 occurring there.

As the epidemic receded, the focus shifted towards restarting economic activity and preventing a resurgence of the virus. Low- and medium-risk areas of the country began to ease social distancing measures on 17 February 2020. Reopening was accompanied by an increase in testing and the development of electronic "health codes" (using smartphone applications) to facilitate contact tracing. Health code applications contain personalized risk information, based on recent contacts and test results. Wuhan, the last major city to reopen, ended its lockdown on 8 April 2020.

China reported its first imported COVID-19 case from an incoming traveler on 30 January. As the number of imported cases rose and the number of domestic cases fell, China began imposing restrictions on entry into the country. Inbound flights were restricted, and all incoming passengers were required to undergo quarantine.

The death toll in China during the first outbreak was approximately 4,600 according to official figures, and has been estimated at under 5,000 by a scientific study of excess pneumonia mortality published in The BMJ.

Blood samples taken by the Chinese CDC from a random sampling of 34,000 citizens in Wuhan and other parts of China one month after the virus first wave was contained showed 4.43% of sampled community members in Wuhan had antibodies. In the wider Hubei area, 0.44% of those sampled were positive for antibodies, while of 12,000 nationally representative samples taken only two recorded positive results.

=== Early censorship and police responses ===
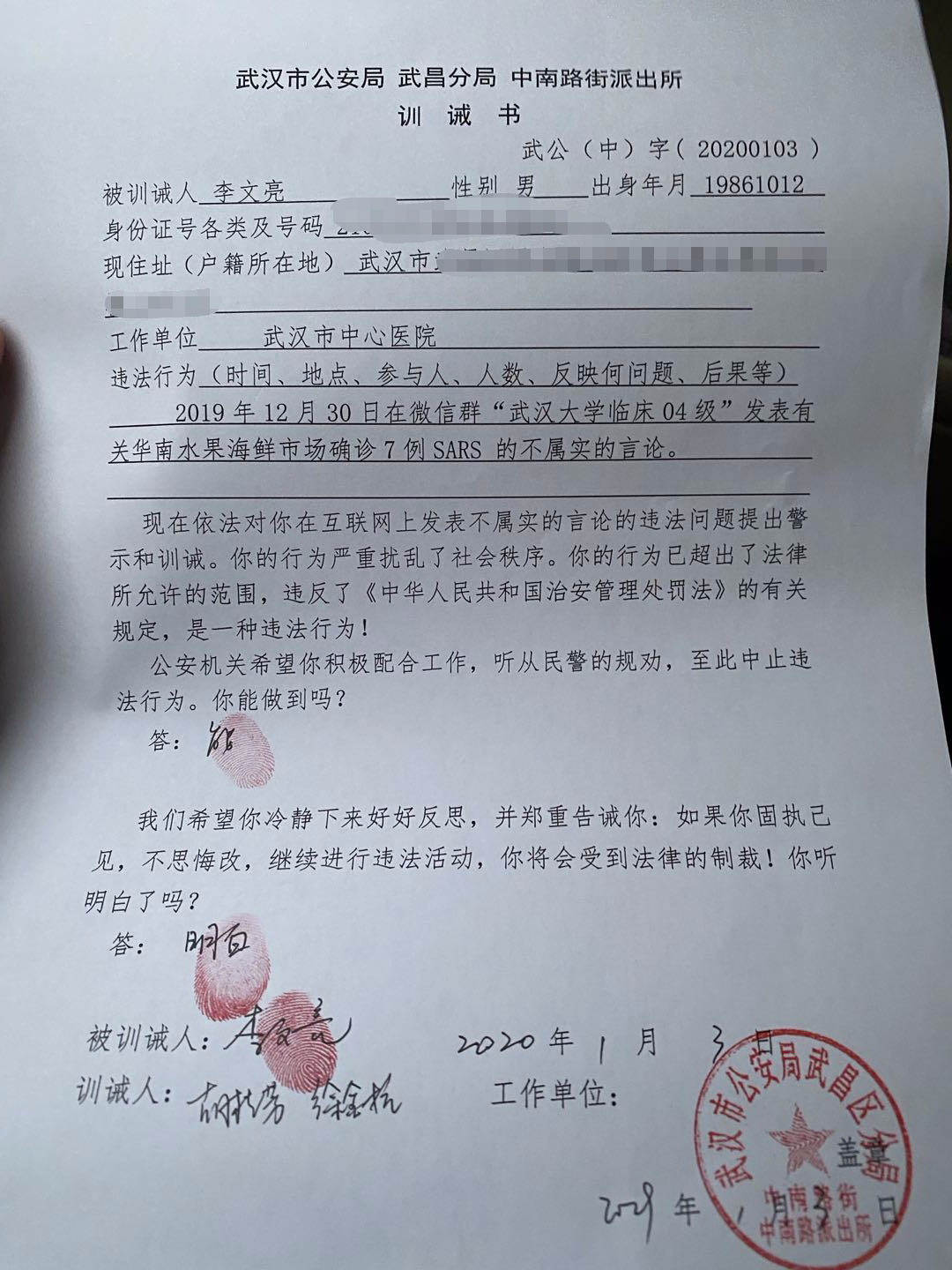
Document issued by the Wuhan Police ordering Li Wenliang to stop "spreading rumours" about a possible 'SARS virus' dated 3 January

The early response by city authorities was criticised as prioritising a control of information that might be unfavorable for local officials over public safety, and China was also criticised for cover-ups and downplaying the initial discovery and severity of the outbreak. By the time China had informed the WHO of the new coronavirus on 31 December 2019, The New York Times reported that the government was still keeping "its own citizens in the dark". Observers have attributed this to the censorship institutional structure of the country's press and internet, exacerbated by Chinese Communist Party leader Xi Jinping's crackdown on independent oversight such as journalism and social media that left senior officials with inaccurate information on the outbreak and "contributed to a prolonged period of inaction that allowed the virus to spread".

A group of eight medical personnel, including Li Wenliang, an ophthalmologist from Wuhan Central Hospital who in late December posted warnings on a new coronavirus strain akin to SARS, were taken into custody by Wuhan police and threatened with prosecution for "spreading rumours" for likening it to SARS. Li Wenliang later died of the disease on 7 February, and was widely hailed as a whistleblower in China, but some of the trending hashtags on Weibo such as "Wuhan government owes Dr Li Wenliang an apology" and "We want freedom of speech" were blocked. His death widespread public anger in the aftermath, in what has been described as "one of the biggest outpourings of online criticism of the government in years," was not a topic that was permitted for coverage.

As part of the central government's "bifurcated approach to diffuse discontent", citizens were permitted to criticise local officials so long as they did not "question the basic legitimacy of the party". The Cyberspace Administration (CAC) declared its intent to foster a "good online atmosphere," with CAC notices sent to video platforms encouraging them "not to push any negative story, and not to conduct non-official livestreaming on the virus". Censorship has been observed being applied on news articles and social media posts deemed to hold negative tones about COVID-19 and the governmental response, including posts mocking Xi Jinping for not visiting areas of the epidemic, an article that predicted negative effects of the epidemic on the economy, and calls to remove local government officials. While censorship had been briefly relaxed giving a "window of about two weeks in which Chinese journalists were able to publish hard-hitting stories exposing the mishandling of the novel coronavirus by officials", since then private news outlets were reportedly required to use "planned and controlled publicity" with the authorities' consent.

== Zero-COVID policy, January 2020 – December 2022 ==
China and a small number of other countries pursued an elimination strategy, also known as a "zero-COVID strategy" (Chinese: 动态清零; pinyin: Dòngtài qīng líng; lit. 'Dynamic Clearing'), which aimed to eliminate local transmission of the virus.

The initial public health response was successful in reducing transmission to near zero within China. In the 18 months after containing the initial outbreak, China had two COVID-19 deaths.

In March and April 2020, as lockdowns and other restrictions were eased, attention shifted to preventing imported cases from abroad from causing a resurgence of the virus within China. International flights to China were heavily restricted, and incoming travelers were required to undergo PCR testing and quarantine. Through November 2020, these quarantine measures prevented nearly 4,000 infected international travelers from entering the wider community.

In June 2020, the China CDC COVID-19 Emergency Response Team described its elimination strategy. The measures employed to contain new outbreaks include aggressive contact tracing, isolation of infected people, quarantine of their close contacts, large-scale nucleic acid testing and domestic travel restrictions from high-risk areas. Contact tracing is aided by the use of "health code" smartphone applications.

In order to detect new outbreaks early, routine PCR testing was carried out on all patients with fever or respiratory symptoms, medical staff and workers who handle imported goods. When an infected person was identified, all close contacts are required to undergo a 14-day centralized quarantine, with multiple rounds of PCR testing. During outbreaks, community-wide PCR testing was carried out in order to identify infected people, including those without symptoms. Community-wide screening was intended to rapidly isolate infected people from the general population, and to allow a quicker return to normal economic activity. Community-wide screening was first carried out from 14 May to 1 June 2020 in Wuhan, and as of 2021 was used in subsequent outbreaks in China.

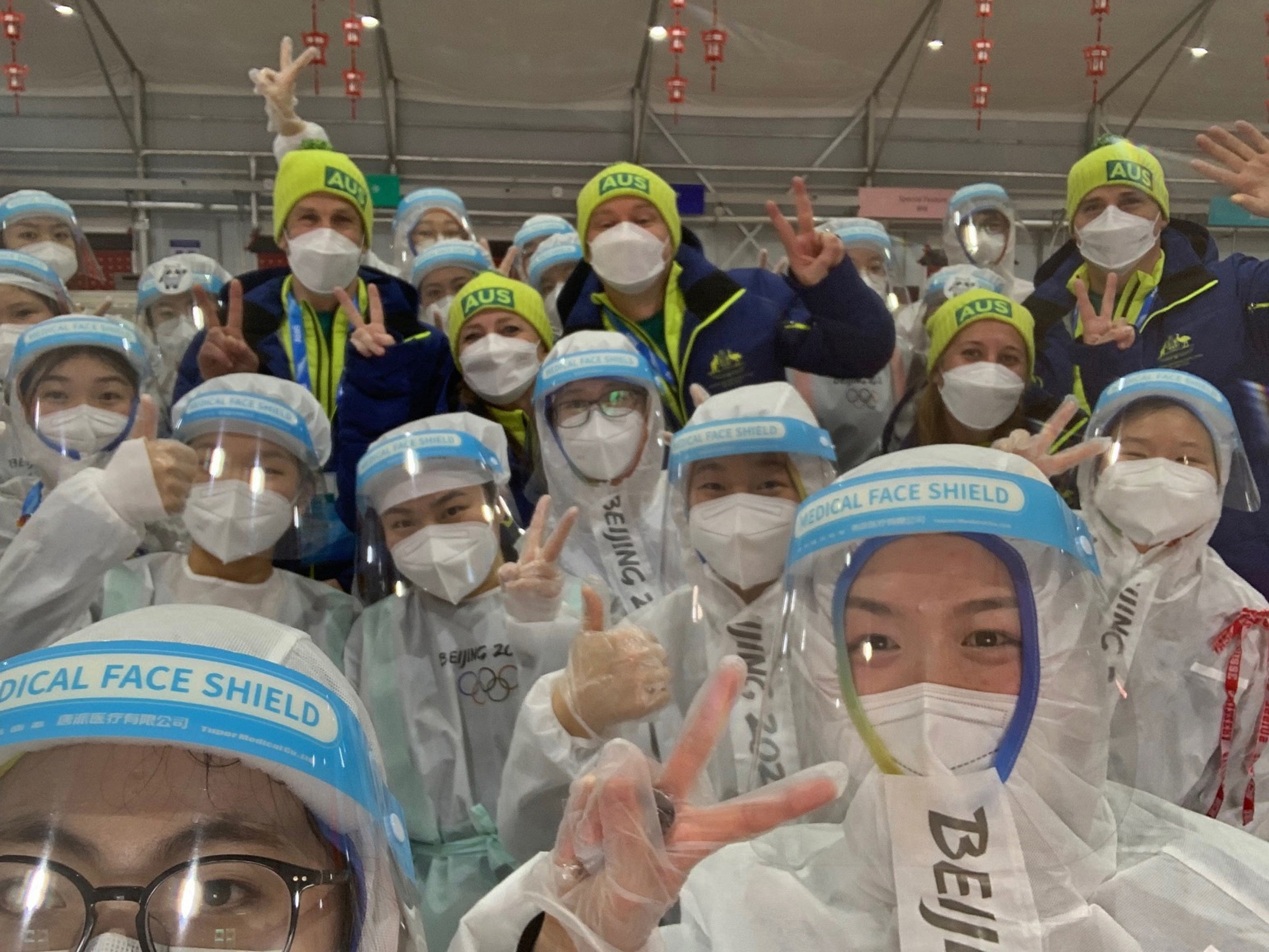
The Australian team pictured with local staff at the 2022 Winter Paralympics. All wear personal protective equipment in adherence with China's bio-secure bubble at the event.

China's zero-COVID policy had implications for the 2022 Winter Olympics and Paralympics in Beijing. Protocols included a bio-secure bubble for international athletes separated from the Chinese public, with only local spectators at a strict capacity limit permitted to attend. Beijing has maintained one of the strictest COVID controls in the world, which is why thousands of people showed defiance against Chinese authorities by protesting at universities and in major cities. Their demands included not only freedom from constant Covid tests and lockdowns, but also an end to strict censorship and tight control of the Communist Party over all aspects of life.

=== Response to subsequent outbreaks ===
After the end of the initial outbreak in Hubei province, there were additional, smaller outbreaks caused by imported cases throughout 2020, which were controlled through short-term, localized intense public health measures.

In June and July 2020, the COVID-19 pandemic in Beijing showed a second outbreak. The first case was discovered on 11 June, after 56 days without any known local transmission. The outbreak was centered on an agricultural wholesale market. Residents of the surrounding neighborhoods and close contacts of known cases were tested, and a total of 368 people infected with the virus were discovered. The outbreak was brought to a halt by 5 July 2020, less than a month after it began.

In October 2020, after a period of two months without any known domestically transmitted COVID-19 cases, three new cases were detected in the port city of Qingdao. Two dock workers with asymptomatic infections were subsequently identified as the probable source of the outbreak. The population of Qingdao was screened using pooled PCR testing, with total of 10.9 million people being tested within 5 days of the detection of the first cases. This led to the identification of 9 additional cases. Travel restrictions were imposed on the city, requiring people leaving the city to present a negative PCR test and to quarantine for one week. The outbreak was brought to an end without a lockdown.

From July through August 2021, China experienced and contained 11 outbreaks of the Delta variant, with a total of 1,390 detected cases. The largest of these outbreaks, in both geographic extent and in the number of people infected, began in Nanjing. The index case of the outbreak, an airport worker, tested positive on 20 July 2021, and the outbreak was traced back to an infected passenger on a flight from Moscow that had arrived on 10 July. The outbreak spread to multiple provinces before it was contained. Through 26 August, 1,162 infections related to the Nanjing outbreak were reported.

China's later response to the pandemic has been praised by some foreign leaders and scientists. After the lockdown of Wuhan, it was reported in the journal Policy Design and Practice that "China has managed to contain this unprecedented public health crisis reasonably swiftly".

==== 2022 outbreaks and end of zero-COVID policy ====
In April 2022, amidst the largest outbreak in China since early 2020 driven by the Omicron variant, China continued to uphold its zero-COVID policy, although a reduction was made to quarantine periods and self-testing kits were made more widely available. Notably, the city of Shanghai was placed in a strict city-wide lockdown.

On 12 May 2022, the National Immigration Administration announced further rules to restrict overseas travel, putting a strict halt on "unnecessary" exits, over COVID concerns. The original verbal advice against traveling is to be upgraded to direct limitations on passport issue. Overseas study, work, and business trips are still allowed.

In November 2022, despite the number of cases in China reaching the highest levels in months, the Chinese government decided to ease the COVID-19 restrictions. Under the new rules, the quarantine period for close contacts was reduce to five days in a state facility and three days at home. Besides, the policy which penalized airlines for bringing in too many cases was also scrapped. The decision was taken citing the economic situation, which faced a blow due to China's zero-COVID policy. The authorities, however, stated that their war against the pandemic remains "unchanged". On 15 November, the lockdown policies led to the breakout of nationwide protests.

On 7 December 2022, after the protests, the Chinese government lifted many of the most stringent rules, reducing lockdowns and allowing people testing positive for COVID-19 to quarantine at home rather instead of being detained in a hospital or mass quarantine site; these changes effectively led to the end of the zero-COVID policy. By the end of December, Chinese authorities effectively ended mass testing and changed their reporting criteria in a way that excludes most deaths caused by COVID-19 from being reported.

==== Xinjiang ====
In August 2020, an outbreak in Urumqi, the capital of Xinjiang, caused officials to declare a state of "wartime" lockdown. Transportation including trains and buses were canceled, and residents started protests. Some online claims reported residents had been forced to use traditional Chinese medicine, handcuffed to buildings, and told to stay indoors for weeks.

In October 2020, it was reported that China's largest outbreak in months appeared to be occurring in a Xinjiang factory linked to "forced labour and the government's controversial policies towards Uighur residents". The outbreak prompted officials in northwestern China's Xinjiang region to implement a mandatory lockdown of residents in Ghulja.

Tight restrictions on information flowing out of Xinjiang have added to the confusion over the virus's spread in the province.

=== Case and death count statistics ===
As of 2020, papers from academic journals and publishers such as Science, Nature, The Lancet, and Karger Publishers had regarded China's measures to domestically contain COVID-19 to be effective. A study in March 2020 published in Science Magazine concluded that the Wuhan travel ban and national emergency response may have prevented more than 700,000 COVID-19 cases outside the city. As of 31 December 2021, official statistics showed 102,083 cumulative confirmed cases (Note: The government only classifies cases as "confirmed" when the patient meets specific criteria. As of March 2022, the current requirements are a positive test and two out of three signs: COVID symptoms, CT pneumonia diagnosis, and blood count changes; the remainder is termed "asymptomatic". In other words, one can be labelled "asymptomatic" despite showing cold-like symptoms. Cases which are asymptomatic are reported separately.) and 4,636 cumulative deaths in mainland China. This corresponds to 3.2 deaths per million inhabitants.

A study published in The BMJ found that 4573 additional pneumonia deaths occurred in Wuhan from January to March 2020, compared with the same period in 2019. Outside of Wuhan, no measurable increase in pneumonia deaths was observed. Though there were confirmed COVID-19 deaths outside of Wuhan, the authors speculated that lockdowns suppressed influenza transmission sufficiently to offset these deaths.

A survey of seroprevalence conducted in April 2020 found that 4.4% of people in Wuhan had antibodies to SARS-CoV-2, indicating that they had been infected. Seroprevalence fell with distance from Wuhan, indicating that the initial outbreak had been largely contained to the city. Elsewhere in Hubei province, 0.4% of people had antibodies, while outside of Hubei province, less than 0.1% of people had antibodies. These results imply that in the first wave, approximately 500,000 people were infected in Wuhan, 210,000 people were infected in the rest of Hubei province, and 120,000 people were infected outside of Hubei province. A study conducted from March to April 2020 found that between 3.2% and 3.8% of people in Wuhan tested had antibodies to SARS-CoV-2. A study of Hong Kong residents evacuated from Hubei province in March 2020 found that 4% of them had antibodies to SARS-CoV-2.

In November 2020 British epidemiologist Ben Cowling said, "due to the compulsory testing when there is an outbreak, the case numbers in China tend to include a lot of mild or asymptomatic infections that would never have been identified in other parts of the world", which explains China's relatively low case fatality rate. Peer-reviewed antibody studies have found a seropositivity rate of around 3.8% for Wuhan inhabitants.

In May 2020, a commentary article in the journal Global Public Health examined the possibility of inaccurate death counts due to alleged political censorship, but concluded that due to the lack of any known deaths of Hong Kong or Taiwan residents in mainland China, which would be newsworthy, the discrepancy between the official and true death toll is likely not particularly large.

A May 2022 Nature article forecast in a model of China lifting its Zero-COVID policies around 1.5 million deaths, with 74.7% among the unvaccinated elderly (over-60) population. The peak demand for intensive care units would exceed capacity by a factor of fifteen.

On 23 December 2022 the Chinese Center for Disease Control and Prevention published its last daily COVID report, with zero COVID deaths across China.

On 22 January 2023 China's Center for Disease Control and Prevention said between 13 and 19 January 2023, 13,000 deaths were reported. 681 patients had respiratory failure due to Coronavirus infection, and 11,977 had died due to other infection.

== Financial policies ==
On 1 February 2020, the People's Bank of China and other five departments jointly issued the notice on further strengthening financial support for the prevention and control of the epidemic, stating that relevant financial services will be further strengthened during the period affected by the epidemic. For those who are temporarily affected by the epidemic and facing difficulties, the document requires financial institutions to tilt their credit policies appropriately, flexibly adjust their loan repayment arrangements and reasonably postpone the repayment period. Those overdue due to inconvenient repayment during the epidemic period shall not be included in the record of credit investigation and breach of trust.

On 30 January 2020, the Ministry of Finance and NHC issued a notice on the financial guarantee policy for the prevention and control of the new type of pneumonia. The Central Government shall grant a subsidy of 300 yuan per person per day to those who are in direct contact with the cases to be investigated or confirmed who are involved in the diagnosis, treatment, nursing, hospital infection control, case specimen collection, and pathogen detection. For other medical personnel and epidemic prevention workers who take part in epidemic prevention and control, the Central Financial Department shall subsidize them at a rate of 200 yuan per person per day.

In February 2020, the Ministry of Finance, the General Administration of Customs and the General Administration of Taxation jointly announced that from 1 January to 31 March 2020, more preferential import tax policies would be implemented for imported materials used for epidemic prevention and control.

== Food security ==
During the initial outbreak in Wuhan, the government took steps to ensure adequate food supplies in the city, including issuing permits for trucks to go to other cities to get food despite the lockdown.

In May 2022, premier Li Keqiang advised local officials not to allow COVID-19 control measures to affect the harvest, saying that "even if an outbreak is found during the harvest...reaping must go on".

Analyst Darin Friedrichs said that COVID-19 restrictions have caused problems for planting crops in the Northeast, amid "a delicate balancing act" between food security and zero-COVID.

== Political leadership ==
=== Governmental meetings ===
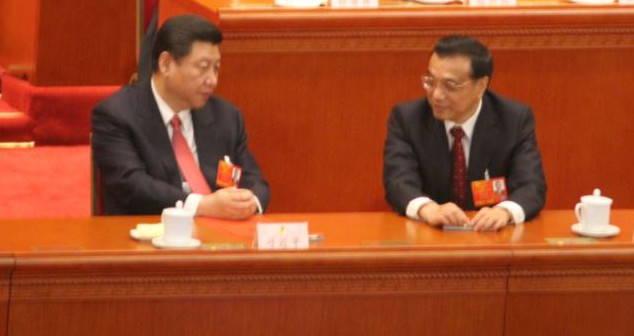
Xi Jinping (left) and Li Keqiang

On 20 January, Chinese Communist Party general secretary Xi Jinping ordered that great attention should be paid to prevention and control of the epidemic. The CCP also vowed to guide people's opinions with intensive publicity strategies and interpretations of current policies to ensure social stability. Premier Li Keqiang urged relevant ministries and localities to take a highly responsible attitude towards the People's health and resolutely prevent the spread of the epidemic. Premier Li Keqiang also called a meeting of the State Council's Executive Meeting and deployed the work of epidemic prevention and control.

On 21 January, Premier Li urged protection and encouraged the health care workers. The National Healthcare Security Administration decided to adopt a special reimbursement policy for confirmed patients and temporarily bring relevant drugs and medical services into the reimbursement scope of medical insurance. On 22 January, Vice Premier Sun Chunlan went to Wuhan to inspect the prevention and control of the epidemic.

On 26 January, the first meeting of the Central Leading Group for the Response to the Epidemic of Pneumonia Caused by 2019-nCoV infection prioritized the provision of urgently needed medical and health forces, protective clothing and face masks for prevention and control in Hubei Province and Wuhan and attached importance to the transport of daily necessities for residents and relief supplies to Hubei. It urged the local governments to enhance epidemic control including cancelling meetings and events, strictly quarantining confirmed and suspected infection cases, extending the Chinese New Year holiday and supporting online office and teaching. The Central Government promised to crack down on hoarding and profiteering in materials for disease prevention and control. Public Finance at all levels should fully guarantee such funds as prevention and control of epidemic situations and treatment of the patients.

=== Xi Jinping's actions ===
On 27 January 2020, Chinese Premier Li Keqiang, entrusted by Communist Party general secretary Xi Jinping according to the state Xinhua News Agency arrived in Wuhan to inspect and guide the epidemic prevention and control work. According to The Wall Street Journal, the appointment of Li who is considered a technocrat surprised some observers, given that he had been sidelined in recent years as Xi concentrated power and cultivated a populist ideological image. Some suggest that Xi was more at risk to the political fallout of the COVID-19 while Li could be a convenient political scapegoat. Li's visit to Wuhan earned high popularity on Chinese social media. Xi Jinping said that he personally commanded the fight against the COVID-19 outbreak when meeting with WHO director general in Beijing on 28 January 2020, but according to a report by The Guardian on 4 February 2020, he has not made any public presence since then, whilst social media posts mocking Xi's absence were promptly deleted by the censors.

On 10 February 2020, Xi publicly appeared for the first time during the outbreak at a residential community in Chaoyang, Beijing . Xinhua posted photos of Xi wearing a mask and said that the aim of Xi's visit was to learn about the situation of epidemic prevision and control at the grassroots level. It was his first time to interact with the people since the outbreak after he paid a short visit to Yunnan during 19–21 January as a tradition that China's leaders observed to visit the smaller towns and villages before the Spring Festival. He was said to chair a meeting on 3 February by the state media, but no pictures or videos were released. Xi also met Cambodian Prime Minister Hun Sen, the first foreign leader to visit China since the COVID-19 outbreak on 5 February.

On 15 February 2020, Qiushi, the CCP's main theoretical magazine, documented a 7 January order by CCP general secretary Xi Jinping regarding the COVID-19 outbreak at a CCP Politburo Standing Committee meeting, 13 days before the public was aware of the outbreak's severity. This appeared to reveal that Xi knew about and was directing the response to the virus on 7 January and raised important questions about whether it was the Central Government that dithered over the response, allowing the virus to spread across the country and eventually the world. However, Homare Endo, director of the Global Institute for China Studies, said a record of the same meeting released beforehand shows there was no mention of the epidemic. She said this indicated that Xi was forced to make "additions" retrospectively because of the public's anger over the death of Li Wenliang, who was arrested by the Wuhan police for early warning of an epidemic.

On 10 March 2020, Xi Jinping visited Wuhan, over one month after Premier Li Keqiang's visit.

At the 2021 G20 Rome summit, Xi called for greater international vaccine cooperation and vaccine equity. This included reiterating China's support for the World Trade Organization's intellectual property waiver, calling for mutual recognition of different COVID-19 vaccines and for developed countries to share vaccine technology with developing countries.

In February 2022, Xi expressed concern to Hong Kong officials over a COVID-19 outbreak Hong Kong, urging them to make containment their "main responsibility" to ensure stability. Amidst China's largest outbreak since 2020 in March 2022, Xi said that China would continue to follow the zero-COVID strategy. In April 2022, while a lockdown in Shanghai was ongoing, Xi again hailed China's zero-COVID approach during a speech, saying it had withstood the test of the 2022 Winter Olympics.

On 5 May 2022, Xi addressed the politburo on the current Covid policy, declaring the policy effective and calling for further implementation. In terms of compliance, he asked for "resolute struggle against all words and deeds that distort, doubt and deny our epidemic prevention policies."

=== Administrative accountability, January 2020 ===
Since the outbreak of the epidemic, a number of government officials have been publicly held accountable for their dereliction of duty in the epidemic prevention in 6 provinces.

On 29 January 2020, Director of Huanggang Health Commission Tang Zhihong did not answer questions from media regarding the capacity of the local hospitals, current hospital usage, and testing capacity. After the clip went viral, the Party Committee of Huanggang removed Tang from her post the next day. On 1 February 2020, according to the Mayor of Huanggang named Qui Lixin, the city authority disciplined 337 of its officials and removed 6 principals who caused disadvantages to the epidemic prevention.

On 2 February 2020, Zhang Cong, Party Secretary of Xuanhua, Hebei was admonished. Zhang Guoqing, Deputy Party Secretary of Xuanhua and Guo Xiaoyi, the political commissar of the local police were given disciplinary actions by the Party. On the same day, Xiangshui, Jiangsu reported three cases of misconduct associated with illegal disclosure of personal data and dereliction of duty. Party secretary, Zhang Changyue and deputy director Gu Bing of the Zhangji Health Center and the director of the Xiangshui CDC were removed or disciplined.

Tang Hu, the director of the Health Bureau of the Nanhu New District in Yueyang, Hunan Province, Cai Junfeng, the deputy director of the Lengshuijiang Municipal Committee, Yang Wen, the deputy director of the municipal government office and He Yong, the deputy secretary of the Gutang Party Committee and township chief were suspended.

On 4 February 2020, Zhang Qin, the vice president of the Hubei Red Cross, was removed from his post while Gao Qin and Chen Bo of the Hubei Red Cross were given a warning. The deputy director of the Wuhan Municipal Bureau of Statistics, Xia Guohua was also removed from his post. The Secretary and Director of the Leading Party Group of the Wuhan Municipal Development and Reform Commission, the Secretary and Director of the Leading Party Group of the Wuhan Municipal Bureau of Statistics, Meng Wukang and the deputy director of the General Office of the Wuhan Municipal Government, Huang Zhitong are admonished.

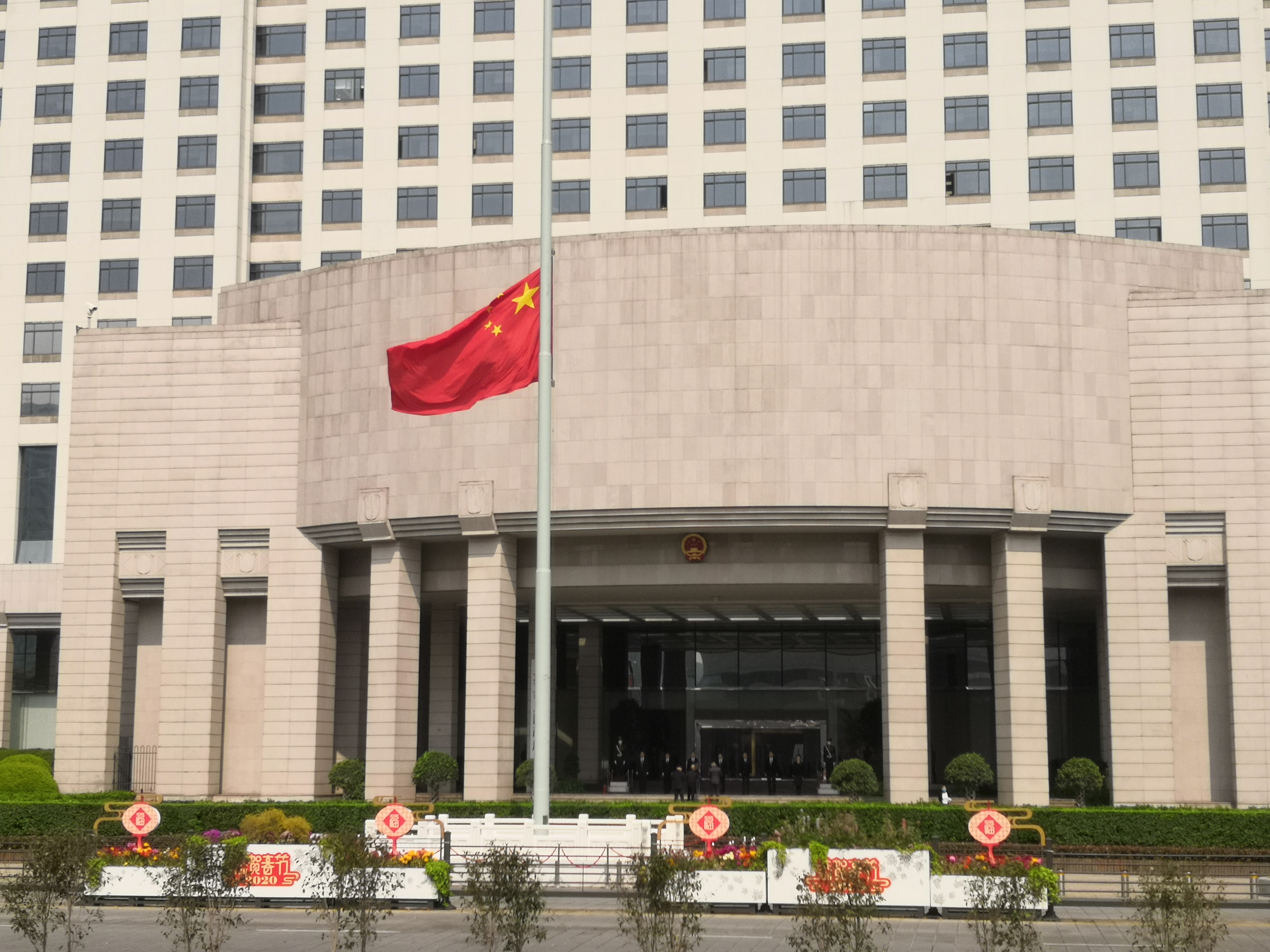
Leaders of the Shanghai Municipal Government mourning in front of the government building

In February 2020, the Chinese government reported 555 confirmed cases in prisons in China, and prison officials were fired as a result.

=== National day of mourning ===
On 3 April, the Chinese government declared 4 April, the Qingming Festival of 2020, a national day of mourning for those who died in the COVID-19 pandemic. At 10 a.m., people were asked to observe three minutes of silence while sirens and vehicle horns blasted out. Chinese flags were flown at half-mast across the country and at embassies overseas. All public entertainment were halted for the day.

== Vaccination and medications ==
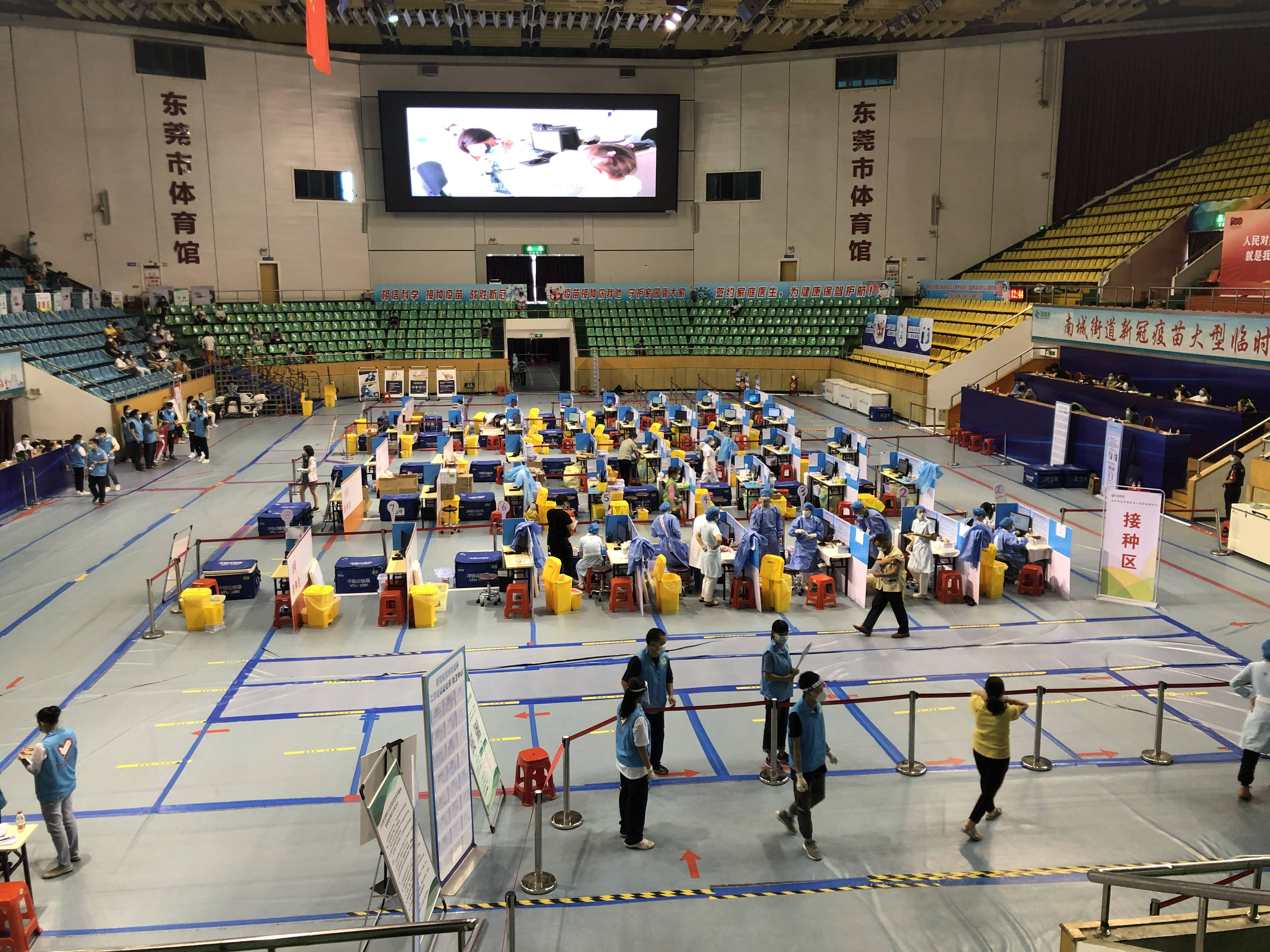
A vaccination centre in Guangdong, June 2021

In July 2020, the Chinese government granted an emergency use authorization for COVID-19 vaccines developed by Sinovac Biotech and China National Biotech Group. The government also approved a vaccine developed by CanSino Biologics for use in the military. By mid-December, authorities said that over one million vaccine doses had been administered to over 650,000 people (the vaccines require two doses), with "no serious adverse reactions". By December, plans were in place to vaccinate more widely, beginning with high-risk groups. The vaccine rollout was delayed by limited supplies and vaccine hesitancy.

In January 2021, multiple Chinese state and Chinese Communist party-affiliated media outlets, including CGTN and the Global Times raised doubts about the efficacy of the Pfizer–BioNTech COVID-19 vaccine, calling for an investigation into the deaths of elderly people in Norway and Germany after receiving the vaccine. According to Reuters, the reports made allegations of "deliberately downplaying the deaths" and "using propaganda power to promote the Pfizer vaccine and smearing Chinese vaccines" and touted Chinese vaccines as "relatively safer due to their mature technology". As of February 2021 China had provided vaccines to 53 developing countries and vaccine exports to 22 countries. Foreign Minister Wang Yi criticized developed countries for hoarding vaccines and urged the international community to "promote fair and equitable distribution of vaccines".

In April 2021, the European External Action Service published a report that cited Chinese state media outlets for "selective highlighting" of potential vaccine side-effects and "disregarding contextual information or ongoing research" to present Western vaccines as unsafe.

In June 2021, China reached one billion of domestically produced vaccine doses administered, representing more than one third of the global total at that point in time. This is about 74 doses per 100 population, a similar rate to many European countries. In June 2021, China was administering nearly 60% of worldwide vaccinations. In August 2021, Xi Jinping announced China's vaccine diplomacy goals of providing 2 billion vaccine doses to other countries by the end of the year.

In August 2022, Pfizer signed an agreement to produce Paxlovid in China. In mid December 2022, however after the loosened restrictions and surging infections China Meheco Group signed an agreement with Pfizer to also import Paxlovid.

As of February 2023, China is not using any mRNA vaccines; in November 2022, it rejected a deal to import Moderna. In March 2023, China approved its first mRNA vaccine, made by the Chinese company CSPC Pharmaceutical Group.

== International aid ==
China has sent tests, equipment, experts, and vaccines to other countries to help fight the pandemic. European Commissioner for Crisis Management Janez Lenarčič expressed gratitude and praised collaboration between the EU and China. Chinese aid has also been well received in parts of Latin America and Africa. Chinese-Americans also marshalled networks in China to obtain medical supplies.

On 13 March, China sent medical supplies, including masks and respirators to Italy, together with a team of Chinese medical staff. While the head of the Italian Red Cross, Francesco Rocca said these medical supplies were donated by the Chinese Red Cross, there were other sources that said that these were paid products and services. Chinese billionaire and Alibaba co-founder Jack Ma also donated 500,000 masks and other medical supplies, which landed at Liege Airport in Belgium on 13 March and then sent to Italy. Italian Prime Minister Giuseppe Conte thanked China for its support and assistance. A former Mexican ambassador Jorge Guajardo said that masks sent to China in January and February were being sold back to Mexico at 20 to 30 times the price.

A U.S. congressional report released in April concluded that "the Chinese government may selectively release some medical supplies for overseas delivery, with designated countries selected, according to political calculations."

On 18 May 2020, the Chinese government pledged US$2 billion to help other countries fight COVID-19 and to aid economic and social development "especially [in] developing countries".

China has also provided vaccines to other countries. In November 2021, the Chinese government pledged to provide 1 billion vaccine doses to African countries, including 600 million donated doses and 400 million other doses, in addition to the 200 million doses it had already provided. In the same announcement, Xi pledged additional investment in Africa and promised to send 1,500 public health experts.

== Virus origin investigations ==
The central government has restricted the publication of some COVID-19 origins academic research. A directive was issued by the Ministry of Education's science and technology department, stating "academic papers about tracing the origin of the virus must be strictly and tightly managed", requiring that such papers be vetted by a State Council task force. An anonymous Chinese researcher said "I think it is a coordinated effort from (the) Chinese government to control (the) narrative, and paint it as if the outbreak did not originate in China. And I don't think they will really tolerate any objective study to investigate the origination of this disease." The researcher said that such a move would obstruct important scientific research. Yanzhong Huang of the think tank Council on Foreign Relations said, "it is no surprise that the government seeks to control related scientific research so that the findings do not challenge its own narrative on the origin of the virus and the government response to the crisis".

In April 2020, the broad scientific consensus was that SARS-CoV-2 originated in bats. The Chinese government's reluctance to participate in investigations has fueled speculation into the much less likely COVID-19 lab leak theory.

=== Reactions to government response ===
In January 2020, the exodus from Wuhan before the lockdown resulted in angry responses on Chinese microblogging website Sina Weibo from the residents in other cities, who were concerned that it could result in the spreading of the novel coronavirus to their cities. Some in Wuhan were concerned with the availability of provisions and especially medical supplies during the lockdown.

On 23 January 2020 the World Health Organization called the Wuhan lockdown unprecedented and said that it showed how committed the authorities were to containing a viral breakout. Later, the WHO clarified that the move was not a recommendation that it made and that the authorities had to wait and see how effective it was. The WHO separately stated that the possibility of locking an entire city down, as happened in this case, was new to science.

On 23 January 2020, the CSI 300 Index, an aggregate measure of the top 300 stocks in the Shanghai and Shenzhen stock exchanges, dropped almost 3%, the biggest single-day loss in almost 9 months after the Wuhan lockdown was announced as the investors that were spooked by the drastic measure sought a safe haven for their investments.

In January 2020, the lockdown caused panic in the city of Wuhan, and some expressed concern about the city's ability to cope with the outbreak. Medical historian Howard Markel argued that the Chinese government "may now be overreacting, imposing an unjustifiable burden on the population" and said that "incremental restrictions, enforced steadily and transparently tended to work far better than draconian measures." Others such as Anthony Fauci, the director of the National Institute of Allergy and Infectious Diseases, defended the intent behind the lockdowns, citing that the lockdowns bought the world a "delay to essentially prepare better." A mathematical epidemiologist named Gerardo Chowell of Georgia State University stated that based on mathematical modelling, "containment strategies implemented in China are successfully reducing transmission".

=== Response from the scientific community ===
On 29 January 2020, the Ministry of Science and Technology issued a notice, urging the scientists "to write their papers on the land of the motherland, to use the results to fight the epidemic" and the scientists should not focus on publishing their papers until the epidemic prevention and control task is completed. Duowei News believed this was aimed to respond to the academic conflict between Zhang Yongzhen's group from Fudan University which published the first genomic sequence of 2019-nCoV and the Gao Shan group from Nankai University which published an analysis on the sequence without authorization from Zhang. Before the notice, Nankai and Fudan, two of China's top universities had a fight over the alleged academic misconduct related to the analysis published by the Gao Shan group.

On 30 January 2020, Wang Liming, a neuroscientist from Zhejiang University expressed anger on a Weibo post about George F. Gao's latest NEJM article. Wang believed that the article indicated that the Chinese CDC had clear evidence of human-to-human transmission in early January and kept it secret until three weeks later. Although the post was soon deleted, China CDC came under the spotlight. China CDC had to respond on the next day that the research was a retrospective analysis of the 425 cases reported to CDC on 23 January. Jennifer Zeis of NEJM's media Relations Department told The Paper, a Chinese newspaper that it took only two days to publish the article, but she refused to give further details.

By 30 January 2020 at least 54 English-language papers about the new coronavirus in China had been published. Zuofeng Zhang, a public health expert from UCLA interviewed by the mainland China-based magazine Intellectual, asked why the published data were not used in epidemic control even before their publication.

The Chinese government funded research on the origin of COVID-19, but also restricted this research.

In 2021, a WHO-led international mission traveled to China to investigate the origins of COVID-19; the Chinese government granted them permission to arrive after initially blocking them due to visa issues.

=== Reaction to proposed origin inquiry ===
In May 2021, after the Australian government had called for an independent inquiry into the origins of COVID-19, Chinese ambassador Cheng Jingye said that Australia was treading a "dangerous path". Shortly afterwards, the Chinese government banned beef imports from Australia's four biggest abattoirs. It also put a tariff of over 80% on Australian barley and informally banned imports of Australian coal. Following a motion supported by 122 members of the World Health Organization at the 2020 World Health Assembly, the Chinese government later agreed to conduct an inquiry. An article in The Economist speculated that an inquiry "might reveal China doing more to suppress information about early infections than to quash the outbreak itself".

== International reactions ==
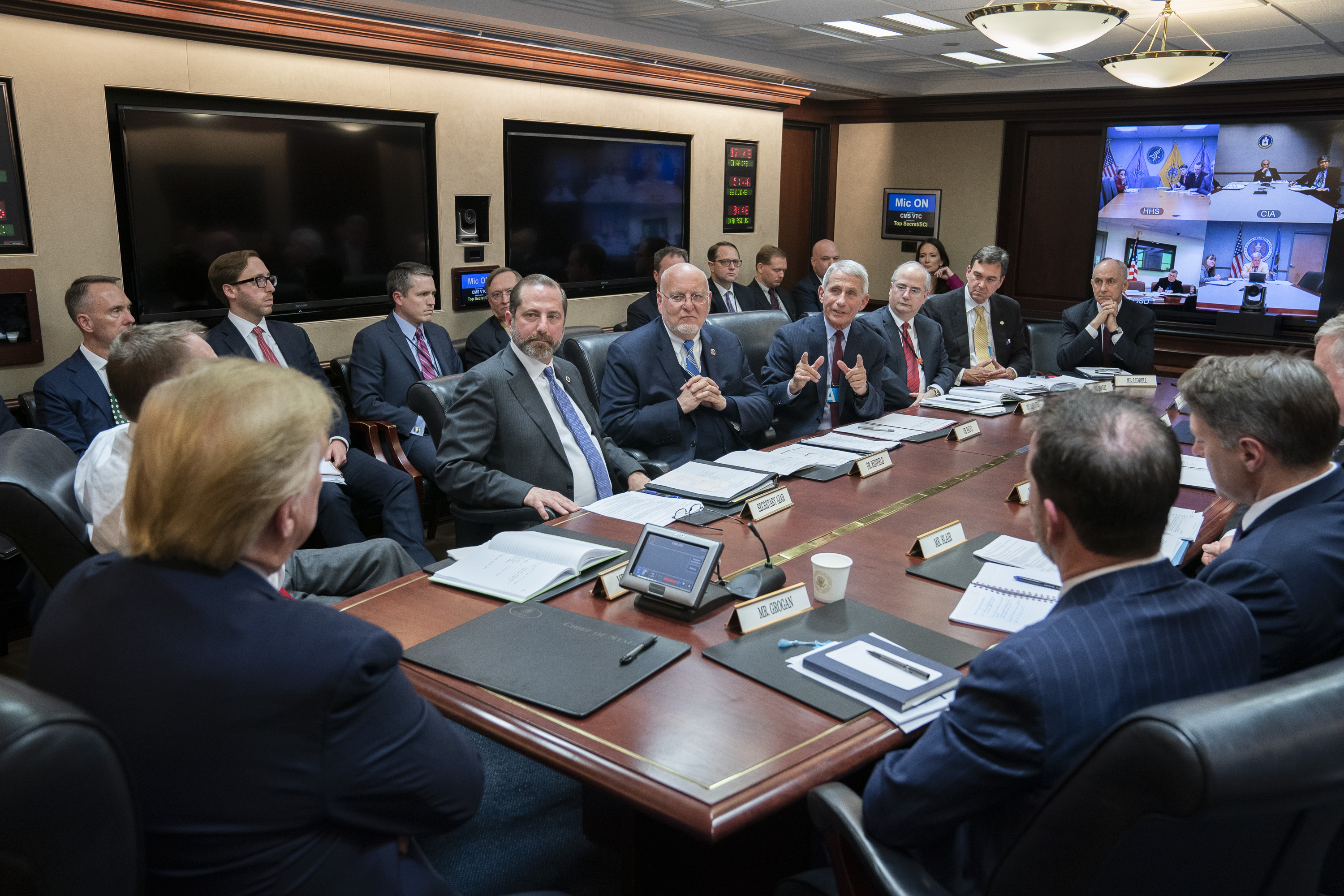
On 29 January 2020, United States President Trump received a briefing on COVID-19 in China.

=== 2020 ===
As of 2020 China's response to the virus had been both praised and condemned by foreign leaders, analysts, and scientists.

UN Secretary General Antonio Guterres stated in February 2020 that it was clear "there is a massive effort that is made by China in order to contain the disease and avoid its propagation" and added the effort was "remarkable". Scientists interviewed by The Lancet Infectious Diseases attributed China's success in ending the initial outbreak in Wuhan to rapid measures to suppress viral transmission and the Chinese public's memory of the 2002–2004 SARS outbreak. According to Gregory Poland of the Mayo Clinic, "Other countries, even though they had much longer to prepare for the arrival of the virus, delayed their response and that meant they lost control."

On 24 January 2020 U.S. President Trump thanked Chinese leader Xi Jinping "on behalf of the American People" on Twitter, stating that "China has been working very hard to contain Coronavirus. The United States greatly appreciates their efforts and transparency." In March 2020, Trump said he was "a little upset with China", saying that the country was "very secretive and that's unfortunate". President Biden would later say Trump failed to hold China accountable on coronavirus.

In January 2020, Germany's health minister Jens Spahn, in an interview on Bloomberg TV, said with comparison to the Chinese response to SARS in 2003: "There's a big difference to SARS. We have a much more transparent China. The action of China is much more effective in the first days already." He also praised the international co-operation and communication in dealing with the virus.

In a February 2020 letter to Xi, Singaporean president Halimah Yacob applauded China's "swift, decisive and comprehensive measures" in safeguarding the health of the Chinese people, while prime minister Lee Hsien Loong remarked of "China's firm and decisive response" in communities affected by the virus. Similar sentiments were expressed by Russian president Vladimir Putin.

During the first half of 2020, health experts, United States intelligence officials, British scientists, and British government officials expressed doubts about the accuracy of the figures provided by the Chinese government relating to the epidemic, raising concerns that the Beijing government deliberately under-reported the extent of infections and deaths.

On 1 April 2020, two United States officials said that China had deliberately concealed its cases and deaths according to a report by US Intelligence Community. The officials asked not to be identified because the report is secret, and declined to detail its contents. The anonymous officials stated that the Chinese central government does not know the extent of the outbreak because lower-level officials reported falsified statistics to avoid losing their positions.

A mid-2020 study by the Pew Research Center found that in most of the 14 countries surveyed, majorities of respondents said China had handled the COVID-19 outbreak poorly, particularly among citizens in Japan, South Korea, Australia, Denmark, Sweden, the United States, and Canada.

=== 2021 ===
On 18 January 2021, an interim report from the independent panel on the world's response to the pandemic led by Helen Clark and Ellen Johnson Sirleaf criticised the local and national health authorities in China for not applying public health measures more forcefully to control the initial outbreak in January 2020.

In 2021, the United States, Britain, South Korea, Israel, Japan, and others issued a joint statement expressing concern with China's handling of the pandemic and requesting an independent evaluation.

=== 2022 ===
In November 2022, commenting on the large-scale protests in China, The Guardian wrote that "The consensus among global health experts is that zero-Covid is unsustainable in the long term", and quoted Paul Hunter of the University of East Anglia saying that the vaccines approved in China were not very protective, that vaccination rates for vulnerable groups were too low, and that lifting of restrictions should be incremental to avoid overwhelming hospitals.

== Censorship and propaganda ==
The government of the People's Republic of China has downplayed the emergence of COVID-19 in China and spread misinformation about its origin and spread around the world. Beijing and pro-China actors have also amplified disinformation and conspiracy theories about COVID-19.

=== Censorship and police responses ===
A pneumonia cluster of unknown cause was observed on 26 December 2019 and treated by the doctor Zhang Jixian in Hubei Provincial Hospital, who informed the Wuhan Jianghan CDC on 27 December. The early response by city authorities was accused of prioritising a control of information on the outbreak. A group of eight medical personnel, including Li Wenliang, an ophthalmologist from Wuhan Central Hospital, who in late December posted warnings on a new coronavirus strain akin to SARS, were warned by Wuhan police for "spreading rumours" for likening it to SARS.

Internal government directive given to all news websites, February 2020

不使用"无法治愈""致命"等标题，防止引起社会恐慌。
"Do not use 'incurable', 'fatal'[,] or similar headlines to avoid causing societal panic."

— Cyberspace Administration of China

By the time China had informed the World Health Organization of the new coronavirus on 31 December 2019, Nicholas Kristof commented that the government was still keeping its own citizens in the dark in an opinion published on The New York Times. While by a number of measures, China's initial handling of the crisis was an improvement in relation to the SARS response in 2003, local officials in Wuhan covered up and downplayed the initial discovery and severity of this outbreak. This has been attributed to the censorship institutional structure of the country's press and Internet, with Jude Blanchette of the Center for Strategic and International Studies quoted stating "under Xi Jinping, the inclination to suppress has become endemic and, in this case, contributed to a prolonged period of inaction that allowed the virus to spread". William Summers, a Yale University professor of medicine, told Undark Magazine though that such silencing and downplaying tactics are not unique to China, and seems to be standard operating procedure worldwide.

On 20 January 2020, Xi Jinping made his first public remark on the outbreak and spoke of the need for the timely release of information. Chinese premier Li Keqiang also urged efforts to prevent and control the epidemic. One day later, the CPC Central Political and Legal Affairs Commission, the most powerful political organ in China overseeing legal enforcement and the police, wrote "self-deception will only make the epidemic worse and turn a natural disaster that was controllable into a man-made disaster at great cost," and "only openness can minimise panic to the greatest extent." The commission then added, "anyone who deliberately delays and hides the reporting of cases out of self-interest will be nailed on a pillar of shame for eternity." Also on the same day, Xi Jinping instructed authorities to strengthen the guidance of public opinions, language which some view as a call for censorship after commentators on social media became increasingly pointedly critical and angry at the government due to the epidemic. Some view this as contradictory to the calls for openness that the central government had already declared.

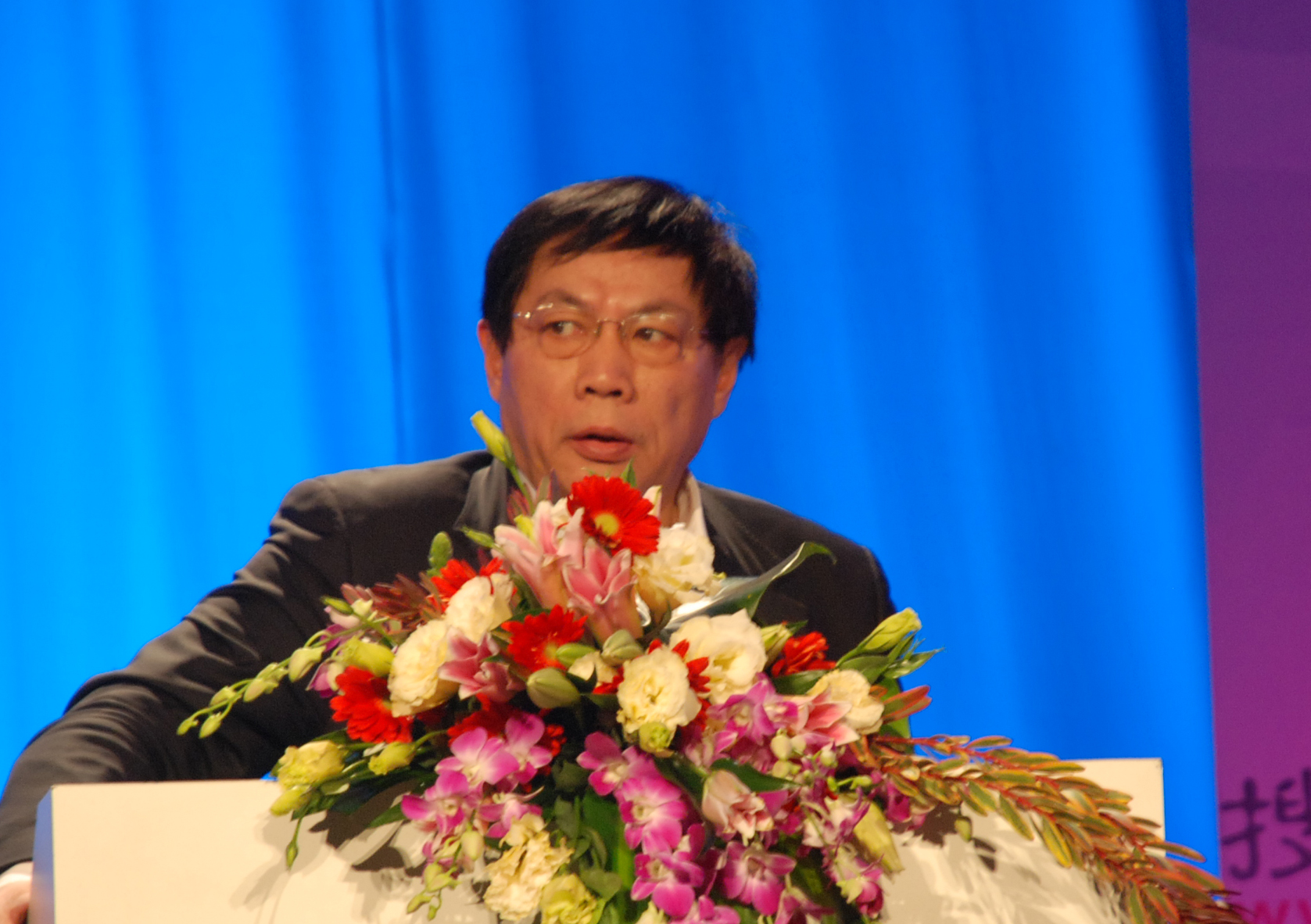
Chinese real estate tycoon Ren Zhiqiang was sentenced to 18 years in prison for corruption after criticizing CCP leader Xi Jinping over the handling of China's response to the COVID-19 pandemic.

In January 2020, citizens were permitted to criticise local officials so long as they did not question the basic legitimacy of the party as part of the central government's bifurcated approach to diffuse discontent, while the propaganda machinery was going into "overdrive...to protect [Xi Jinping's] reputation". The Cyberspace Administration (CAC) declared its intent to foster a good online atmosphere, with CAC notices sent to video platforms encouraging them not to push any negative story, and not to conduct non-official livestreaming on the virus. Censorship has been observed being applied on news articles and social media posts deemed to hold negative tones about the COVID-19 and the governmental response, including posts mocking Xi Jinping for not visiting areas of the epidemic, an article that predicted negative effects of the epidemic on the economy, and calls to remove local government officials. Chinese citizens have reportedly used innovative methods to avoid censorship to express anger about how government officials have handled the initial outbreak response, such as using the word 'Trump' to refer to Xi Jinping, or 'Chernobyl' to refer to the outbreak as a whole. As of February 2020 younger individuals created digital archives of media concerning the epidemic – which is prone to deletion by censors – and posting them on the exterior web. While censorship had been briefly relaxed giving a "window of about two weeks in which Chinese journalists were able to publish hard-hitting stories exposing the mishandling of the novel coronavirus by officials", since then private news outlets were reportedly required to use "planned and controlled publicity" with the authorities' consent.

On 30 January 2020 China's Supreme Court delivered a rare rebuke against the country's police forces, calling the "unreasonably harsh crackdown on online rumours" as undermining public trust. In what has been called a "highly unusual criticism" by observers, supreme court judge Tang Xinghua said that if police had been lenient against rumours and allowed the public to have taken heed of them, an earlier adoption of "measures like wearing masks, strictly disinfecting and avoiding wildlife markets" might have been useful in countering the spread of the epidemic. Human Rights Watch reported that "there is considerable misinformation on Chinese social media and authorities have legitimate reasons to counter false information that can cause public panic," but also noted censorship by the authorities on social media posted by families of infected people who were potentially seeking help as well as by people living in cordoned cities who were documenting their daily lives amidst the lockdown.

Journalists in China have worked to publish information about the outbreak. The government initially allowed greater leeway than usual to reporters investigating the crisis, but then cracked down with greater censorship than usual. On 12 March 2020, ten Tibetans were arrested for breaching control measures meant to prevent the spread of the virus. Dolma Kyab, a Tibetan writer and teacher, told Radio Free Asia that "the Chinese government is using coronavirus as a convenient excuse to infringe on the human rights of Tibetans".

The New York Times later reported that "authorities issued strict commands on the content and tone of news coverage, directed paid trolls to inundate social media with party-line blather and deployed security forces to muzzle unsanctioned voices."

On 19 February 2020, the Chinese Foreign Ministry announced the revoking of the press credentials of three Wall Street Journal reporters based in Beijing, accusing the Wall Street Journal of failing to apologize for publishing articles which the Foreign Ministry said slandered the Chinese government's response to the COVID-19 outbreak, and failing to investigate and deal with those responsible.

In February 2020, Cheng Lei, an anchor for Chinese state broadcaster CGTN, posted on Facebook that she and her friend Haze Fan, a Bloomberg news assistant, had been trying report from Wuhan. Cheng was detained in August and later charged with "illegally supplying state secrets overseas". Fan was detained later that year in December, and both remain detention.

In May 2022, World Health Organization director-general Tedros Adhanom Ghebreyesus commented that the zero-COVID strategy is no longer considered sustainable based on "the behavior of the virus now" and future trends. The comment was quickly suppressed on the Chinese Internet.

=== Response to whistleblowers ===
On 18 December 2019, Ai Fen, director of the emergency department of Central Hospital of Wuhan, came into contact with an unusual pulmonary infection from a delivery person of Huanan Seafood Wholesale Market. On 27 December, she received a second patient with similar symptoms, but who had no link to the wet market. In the afternoon of 30 December, upon seeing the words "SARS coronavirus, pseudomonas aeruginosa", Ai immediately reported to the hospital's public health department and infection department. She circled the word "SARS", and took an image of it and forwarded it to another doctor in Wuhan. From there it spread throughout medical circles in Wuhan, and reached Li Wenliang, an ophthalmologist at the hospital. On the afternoon of the same day, Li sent a warning to former classmates over WeChat which was reposted widely. In an interview with Renwu magazine, Ai said she was reprimanded after alerting her superiors and colleagues of the SARS-like virus in December. Li Wenliang would later be canonised on the internet as a heroic whistleblower, and Ai would be lauded as the one who provided the whistle.

On 1 January 2020, eight people were summoned for talks by Wuhan police for their claim that there were SARS cases in Wuhan. Li Wenliang said he didn't know whether he was one of them or not. According to Wang Gaofei, Weibo's CEO, the eight people are all doctors at Wuhan hospitals who "are still fighting at the frontline". The Supreme Court defended these doctors and pointed out in a WeChat article on 28 January 2020, delay and opacity in public information are the root of fake news and the information that is mostly factual and not subjectively malicious and causes no objectively severe consequences should be tolerated. On 29 January 2020, the eight doctors were also praised by Zeng Guang, Chief Scientist at China CDC. Hu Xijin, the editor of the CCP-owned tabloid Global Times, complained about the local governments' low tolerance of differing online opinions and believed this weakened checks-and-balances of government powers through news media.

==== Death of Li Wenliang, February 2020 ====
After Li Wenliang was warned by Wuhan police, the doctor was diagnosed with the COVID-19 infection and died of it on 7 February 2020. He was said to be dead on the evening of 6 February, although the hospital said that he was still under emergency treatment. People speculated that authorities were trying to censor the news. After his death, people mourned his death and criticized the government. some of the trending hashtags on Weibo such as "Wuhan government owes Dr. Li Wenliang an apology" and "We want freedom of speech" became trending topics on Weibo until the posts were deleted by censors. While media outlets were allowed to report his death, the nature of the doctor's censorship which produced widespread public anger in the aftermath, in what has been described as "one of the biggest outpourings of online criticism of the government in years," was not a topic that was permitted for coverage.

A group of Chinese academics including Xu Zhangrun of Tsinghua University signed an open letter calling for the central government to issue an apology to Li and to protect freedom of speech. Professor Zhou Lian of Renmin University has observed that the epidemic has "allowed more people to see the institutional factors behind the outbreak and the importance of freedom of speech". After attempts to discourage the discussion on Dr. Li's death further escalated online anger, the central government has been accused of reportedly attempting to co-opt the incident by "cast[ing] Dr. Li's death as the nation's sacrifice – meaning, the Chinese Communist Party's own".

In March 2020, Wuhan police apologised to Li Wenliang's family after National Supervisory Commission and Beijing Investigators announced that they found the conduct of local officials was inadequate and praised the whistleblower's effort on raising public awareness. Shortly after the official findings were published, Wuhan police announced that the two officers responsible for improperly reprimanding Li had been disciplined.

==== Zhang Ouya's criticism, January 2020 ====
In January 2020, Zhang Ouya, the chief journalist of Hubei Daily called for the removal of the current leaders of Hubei and Wuhan on Weibo. But, he was asked to remove his post and the newspaper that he worked for apologized to the Wuhan authorities, promising that they will publish only positive content from now on. Mayor Zhou of Wuhan said to the state media "As a local government, I could not disclose information until I get information and authorization which was not understood at the time." His argument which hinted at the Central Government's responsibility, was refuted by China CDC. Chief Scientist Zeng Guang said to CCP tabloid Global Times that what the scientists said was "often only part of their decision-making" and praised the eight whistleblowers who were warned by the Wuhan authorities before the epidemic.

=== Suppression of information about the initial Wuhan outbreak, January 2020 ===
As COVID-19 began spreading within China between December 2019 to February 2020, Chinese authorities prevented doctors and laboratories from sharing information about the outbreak, including admonishing frontline healthcare professionals and perceived whistleblowers, most notably, Li Wenliang. The virus was first partially sequenced on 26 December 2019, On 5 January 2020, Shanghai virologist Zhang Yongzhen obtained a full sequence and submitted it to the United States NIH's GenBank database that same day. On 11 January 2020, Zhang gave permission to Edward C. Holmes to upload the sequence to the publicly available Virological.org discussion forum. This violated a notice from China's National Health Commission sent to laboratories in Wuhan on 3 January, which forbade publishing about the virus without authorization. Zhang said he was not aware of the NHC notice at the time.

==== Arrest or disappearance of citizen journalists, 2020 ====
As of December 2020, around a year after the outbreak, at least 47 journalists were in detention in China for their reporting on the initial coronavirus outbreak.

Chinese citizen journalist Chen Qiushi started reporting on the outbreak from Wuhan on 23 January 2020. He disappeared on 6 February. On 24 September, a friend said he had been found. He was being supervised by "a certain government department", but would not face prosecution for the moment because he had not contacted opposition groups.

Fang Bin is a Chinese citizen journalist who broadcast images of Wuhan during the outbreak several times on social media. He was arrested several times during February 2020. The last arrest was on 9 February 2020. As of May 2023, he returned back to Wuhan, after spending three years in jail.

Li Zehua was reporting on the outbreak from Wuhan in February 2020. On 26 February, he was caught by the authorities after livestreaming part of the chase. On 22 April, he returned to social media with a brief statement in which he quoted a proverb that the human mind was "prone to err". A friend said he may have been told by authorities to make the statement.

Another citizen journalist, Zhang Zhan, stopped sharing information on social media in May 2020. On 28 December, she was sentenced to 4 years in prison. According to one of her attorneys, she was convicted of "picking quarrels and provoking trouble".

=== Restrictions on publishing COVID-19 data and research, 2020 ===
In April 2020, The Observer reported that the Chinese government was cracking down on academic publications which investigated the origins of SARS-CoV-2. The article cited notices placed on, and subsequently removed from, the websites of Fudan University and the China University of Geosciences in Wuhan.

In December 2020, the Associated Press reported that all publication of research had to be treated "like a game of chess" under instructions from Xi Jinping, and propaganda and public opinion teams were to "guide publication". A leaked 3-page notice obtained by the AP mentions "instructions on epidemic prevention and control by General Secretary Xi Jinping" and ends by stating that those who publish "unconfirmed false information" without approval and cause "serious adverse social impacts" would be held accountable.

== See also ==
- Health in China
- National responses to the COVID-19 pandemic
- Politics of China
