= COVID-19 misinformation by China =

Misinformation about contagious disease

The government of the People's Republic of China has downplayed the emergence of COVID-19 in China and spread misinformation about its origin and spread around the world. Beijing and pro-China actors have also amplified disinformation and conspiracy theories about COVID-19.

== Initial response ==
=== Downplaying early signs ===
In the first weeks, the dangers to the public were downplayed, leaving 11 million Wuhan residents unaware and vulnerable to the virus. Political motivations were blamed in part for the reluctance by local officials to go public as they were "preparing for their annual congresses in January". Despite the increase in COVID cases, officials continued to declare that "there had likely been no more infections."

In a March 2020 interview, Ai Fen, the director of Wuhan Central Hospital's emergency department, stated in an interview that "she was told by superiors ... that Wuhan's health commission had issued a directive that medical workers were not to disclose anything about the virus, or the disease it caused, to avoid sparking a panic."

Chris Buckley and Steven Lee Myers wrote in the New York Times that "The government's initial handling of the epidemic allowed the virus to gain a tenacious hold. At critical moments, officials chose to put secrecy and order ahead of openly confronting the growing crisis to avoid public alarm and political embarrassment."

By summer 2020, China had the virus largely under control. In December 2020, the BBC News published a retrospective into how Chinese state media and China's online government censors had suppressed negative information and propagandized what was reported.

=== Silencing of medical workers ===
Li Wenliang was an ophthalmologist at Wuhan Central Hospital. On 30 December 2019, he had seen seven cases of a virus he thought looked like SARS. He sent a message to fellow doctors in a chat group warning them to wear protective clothing to avoid infection. He and seven other doctors were later told to come to the Public Security Bureau and told to sign a letter. The letter accused them of "making false comments" that would "disturb the social order". Wang Guangbao, who is a Chinese surgeon and science writer, later said that by 1 January, people in medical circles thought that a SARS-like virus might be spreading, but the police warning discouraged them from talking openly about it. Li later died of the virus, and China later apologized to his family and overturned the warning in the letter.

A nurse said that by early January, doctors and nurses had noticed that they too were getting sick. Hospital administrators made long calls to the City Government and Health Commission. However, medical personnel were not allowed to wear protective gear, because it would cause panic. Health and governance experts place much of the blame on higher-level officials, as local authorities in China can be punished for reporting bad news.

=== Arrest or disappearance of citizen journalists ===
As of December 2020, around a year after the outbreak, at least 47 journalists were currently in detention in China for their reporting on the initial coronavirus outbreak.

Chinese citizen journalist Chen Qiushi started reporting on the outbreak from Wuhan on 23 January 2020. He disappeared on 6 February. On 24 September, a friend said he had been found. He was being supervised by "a certain government department", but would not face prosecution for the moment because he had not contacted opposition groups.

Fang Bin is a Chinese citizen journalist who broadcast images of Wuhan during the outbreak several times on social media. He was arrested several times during February 2020. The last arrest was on 9 February, and as of September 2020, he had not been seen in public since.

Li Zehua was reporting on the outbreak from Wuhan in February 2020. On 26 February, he was caught by the authorities after livestreaming part of the chase. On 22 April, he returned to social media with a brief statement in which he quoted a proverb that the human mind was "prone to err." A friend said he may have been told by authorities to make the statement.

Another citizen journalist, Zhang Zhan, stopped sharing information on social media in May 2020. On 28 December, she was sentenced to 4 years in prison. According to one of her attorneys, she was convicted of "picking quarrels and provoking trouble".

=== Early response ===
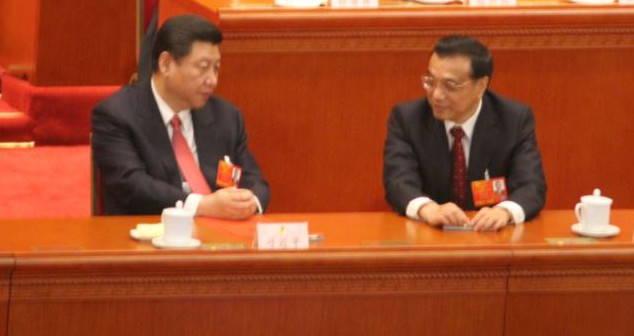
Chinese Communist Party general secretary Xi Jinping (left) and State Council Premier Li Keqiang

In the early stages of the outbreak, the Chinese National Health Commission stated it had no "clear evidence" of human-to-human transmissions. However, at this time the high prevalence of human-to-human transmission was evident to doctors and other health workers, but they were forbidden to express their concerns in public. The Chinese government maintained the stance that human-to-human transmission had not been proven until 20 January 2020 when it was finally confirmed. Research published on 29 January 2020 indicated that, among officially confirmed cases, human-to-human transmission may have started in December 2019, and the delay of disclosure on the results until then, rather than earlier in January, brought criticism of health authorities. Wang Guangfa, one of the health officials, said that "There was uncertainty regarding the human-to-human transmission"; he was infected by a patient within 10 days of making the statement.

On 26 January 2020, the editor of the People's Daily, the official newspaper of the Central Committee of the Chinese Communist Party (CCP), tweeted a claim that the first building of the Huoshenshan Hospital had been completed in only 16 hours. The Daily Beast reported the next day that the building shown in the picture accompanying the tweet was actually a marketing photo of a modular container building sold by the Henan K-Home Steel Structure Company, and not of the actual hospital. A Human Rights Watch researcher claimed that the post was part of the Chinese government's misinformation campaign to hype the government's response. The tweet was later removed and replaced with a video of the modular container buildings being assembled at Huoshenshan Hospital, again stating that the first building had been completed in only 16 hours.

On 15 February 2020, China's paramount leader and CCP general secretary Xi Jinping published an article which claimed he had learned of the epidemic on 7 January 2020 and had the same day issued a request for information on activities to contain the spread of the disease. However, the original public announcement of that 7 January 2020 meeting did not mention the epidemic, and Xi's claim was unsupported by the evidence.

== Multiple origins ==
Chinese officials have variously stated COVID-19 began in Wuhan, originated outside China, or was introduced into China by foreigners or imported goods.

In March 2020, The Washington Post reviewed Chinese state media as well as posts in social media and discovered that anti-American conspiracy theories that were circulating among Chinese users had "gained steam through a mix of unexplained official statements magnified by social media, censorship and doubts stoked by state media and government officials."

In March 2020, Chinese state media propagated the theory that the spread of the virus may have started in Italy before the Wuhan outbreak, pointing to an interview Italian doctor Giuseppe Remuzzi gave to National Public Radio, wherein he mentioned reports of unusual pneumonia cases dating back to November and December 2019. Remuzzi later said that his words were "twisted".

In November 2020, Chinese state media propagated a misleading account of statements by World Health Organization's top emergency director Michael Ryan, speculating that the virus could have originated outside of China. In an interview with Reuters on 27 November 2020, Ryan said, "It is clear from a public health perspective that you start your investigations where the human cases first emerged" and repeated that the WHO would seek to send an investigative team to China to probe the origins of the virus.

In December 2020, Chinese state media misconstrued research from Alexander Kekulé, the director of the Institute for Biosecurity Research in Halle, using it to suggest the virus emerged in Italy. In media published by Xinhua News Agency, China Daily, and China Global Television Network (CGTN), excerpts from an interview Kekulé gave to ZDF were quoted, purporting that 99.5 percent of the coronavirus spreading around the world at the time was from a variant originating in northern Italy. In follow-up interviews, Kekulé said his words were twisted, calling the Chinese media reports "pure propaganda".

In December 2020, the People's Daily featured a study by scientists associated with the state-backed Chinese Academy of Sciences positing that the earliest human-to-human transmission occurred on the Indian subcontinent three to four months before the Wuhan outbreak. The study, which was not peer-reviewed, was posted on the preprint platform SSRN. It was later withdrawn from the platform at the authors' request.

In response to American officials promoting the lab leak theory, spokespersons for the Chinese Ministry of Foreign Affairs such as Hua Chunying, Zhao Lijian, and Geng Shuang promoted the conspiracy theory that the SARS-CoV-2 virus might have originated in the United States from the military biology laboratory Fort Detrick and asked it to be investigated by the US government and the WHO. Their posts quickly went trending on the Chinese social media platform Weibo. In April 2025, after US president Donald Trump revived accusations based on the lab leak theory, the Chinese government "restated its case that COVID-19 may have originated in the United States" according to Reuters. No evidence supports these claims.

=== Huanan market swabs ===
The market was closed on 1 January. Swab samples were taken of surfaces in the market; samples from the actual animals in the market would be more conclusive but could not be collected, as and the animals had been removed before public-health authorities from the Chinese CDC came in. Some Chinese researchers had published a preprint analysis of the Huanan swab samples in February 2022, concluding that the coronavirus in the samples had likely been brought in by humans, not the animals on sale, but omissions in the analysis had raised questions, and the raw sample data had not yet been released.

On 4 March of 2023, the raw data from the swab samples of the Huanan live-animal market were released, or possibly leaked. No raw genetic data had previously been accessible to any academics not working at Chinese institutions until the genetic sequences from some of the market swabs were uploaded to an international database. A preliminary analysis of this data was reviewed by the international research community, which said that it made an animal origin (especially the common raccoon-dog as an intermediate host) much more likely. On 14 March, an international group of researchers presented a preliminary analysis at a meeting of the World Health Organization's Scientific Advisory Group for Origins of Novel Pathogens, at which Chinese COVID-19 researchers were also present. On 17 March, the WHO director-general said that the data should have been shared three years earlier, and called on China to be more transparent in its data-sharing. There exists further data from further samples which has not yet been made public. Maria Van Kerkhove, the WHO's COVID-19 technical lead, called for it to be made public immediately.

=== Reactions ===
A review of Chinese state media and social media posts in early March 2020, conducted by The Washington Post, found that anti-American conspiracy theories circulating among Chinese users "gained steam through a mix of unexplained official statements magnified by social media, censorship and doubts stoked by state media and government officials". United States Department of State officials, as well as sinologist Dali Yang, have said the campaign was intended to deflect attention away from the Chinese government's mishandling of the crisis.

According to the US Secretary of State Mike Pompeo, the Group of Seven (G7) discussed "intentional disinformation campaign" by China. The US government criticised Chinese efforts as "dangerous and ridiculous" conspiracy claims and summoned the Chinese ambassador Cui Tiankai. Cui responded by saying that the US military lab conspiracy theory is "crazy" in February and March 2020.

The Observer reported in April 2020 that China began requiring all academic papers containing information on COVID-19 be vetted by its ministry of science and technology before they can be published. An anonymous researcher told CNN that the crackdown appeared to be a "coordinated effort from [the] Chinese government to control [the] narrative, and paint it as if the outbreak did not originate in China."

In May 2020, Twitter placed fact-check labels on two of the Chinese government tweets which had falsely suggested that the virus originated in the US and was brought to China by the Americans. In November 2020, the People's Daily published the false claim that COVID-19 was "imported" into China. In October 2021, a University of Oxford researcher found that Chinese state media accounts spread a theory that the virus originated from American lobsters from Maine. In March 2022, China Daily and Global Times republished an article by the British conspiracy website The Exposé which falsely claimed COVID-19 was created by Moderna.

== Other misinformation ==
=== Traditional Chinese medicine ===
Beijing championed traditional Chinese medicine (TCM) as a way to treat COVID-19. In early June 2020, China's State Council Information Office published a white paper titled Fighting COVID-19: China In Action which details the plans that were put into place to prevent, control and treat COVID-19, including medical services that integrate TCM and scientific medicine to treat the virus. The paper states that "Chinese herbal formulas and drugs were administered to 92 percent of all confirmed cases" and that 90 percent of confirmed cases in Hubei Province received TCM treatment that proved effective." While TCM supporters claim that there is no downside to its use, the US National Institutes of Health believe that while there may be some relief of symptoms using TCM, the overall efficacy against COVID-19 is inconclusive. Edzard Ernst, a retired UK-based researcher of complementary medicines is quoted in the journal Nature stating, "For TCM there is no good evidence and therefore its use is not just unjustified, but dangerous."

=== Kazakh virus ===
In July 2020, misinformation about a deadlier virus appearing alongside COVID-19 in Kazakhstan was traced to the Economic and Commercial Office of the Chinese Embassy in Kazakhstan. The misinformation was picked up by Xinhua News Agency and from there spread to other Chinese outlets and internationally.

=== Pfizer–BioNTech COVID-19 vaccine ===
In January 2021, multiple Chinese state and CCP-affiliated media outlets, including CGTN and the Global Times, raised doubts about the efficacy of the Pfizer–BioNTech vaccine, calling for an investigation into the deaths of elderly people in Norway and Germany after receiving the vaccine. According to Reuters, the reports made allegations of "deliberately downplaying the deaths" and "using propaganda power to promote the Pfizer vaccine and smearing Chinese vaccines" and touted Chinese vaccines as "relatively safer due to their mature technology".

In April 2021, the European External Action Service published a report that cited Chinese state media outlets for "selective highlighting" of potential vaccine side-effects and "disregarding contextual information or ongoing research" to present Western vaccines as unsafe.

== As part of the Cross-Strait conflict ==
In February 2020, the Taiwanese Central News Agency reported that large amounts of misinformation had appeared on Facebook claiming the pandemic in Taiwan was out of control, the Taiwanese government had covered up the total number of cases, and that President Tsai Ing-wen had been infected. The Taiwan fact-checking organization had suggested the misinformation on Facebook shared similarities with mainland China due to its use of simplified Chinese characters and mainland China vocabulary. The organization warned that the purpose of the misinformation is to attack the government.

In March 2020, Taiwan's Ministry of Justice Investigation Bureau warned that China was trying to undermine trust in factual news by portraying the Taiwanese government reports as fake news. Taiwanese authorities have been ordered to use all possible means to track whether the messages were linked to instructions given by the Chinese Communist Party. The PRC's Taiwan Affairs Office denied the claims, calling them lies, and said that Taiwan's Democratic Progressive Party was "inciting hatred" between the two sides. They then claimed that the "DPP continues to politically manipulate the virus".

Nick Monaco, the research director of the Digital Intelligence Lab at Institute for the Future, analysed the posts and concluded that the majority appear to have come from ordinary users in China, not the state. However, he criticized the Chinese government's decision to allow the information to spread beyond China's Great Firewall, which he described as "malicious". According to Taiwan News, nearly one in four cases of misinformation are believed to be connected to China.

== International response ==
On 25 March 2020, the "intentional disinformation campaign" by China was discussed among the Group of Seven.

On 17 March 2020, CGTN aired a video in Arabic that Reporters Without Borders classified as misinformation related to the COVID-19 pandemic.

In August 2021, the Swiss Federal Department of Foreign Affairs asked Chinese state media to remove widely quoted allegations, attributed to a non-existing Swiss biologist, that the United States pressured the WHO to blame China for the pandemic.
