= Jie Lijian =

Chinese activist

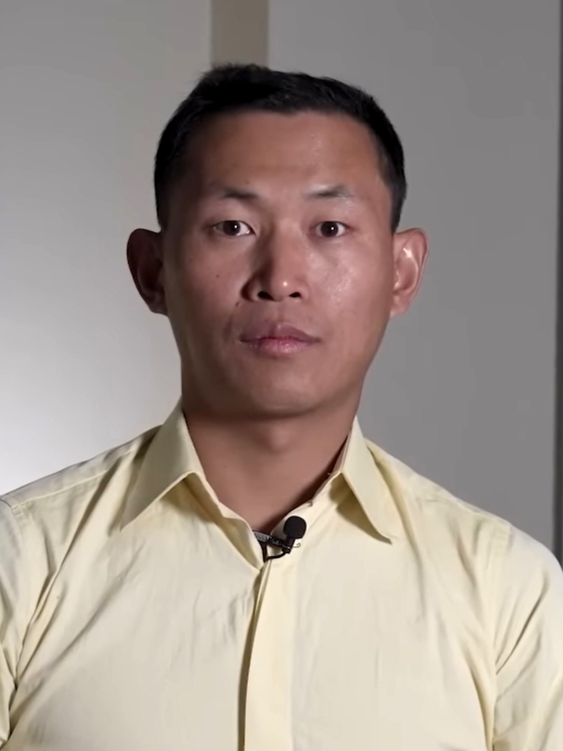

Jie Lijian (Chinese: 界立建) is a Chinese activist based in the United States.

== Life and activism ==
Jie is from the rural village of Gaozhaizi in Shandong.

Jie has reported being jailed repeatedly and suffering police brutality in China. He has said he was detained for taking part in commemorations of the Tiananmen massacre.

In 2018, Jie was treated for mental illness without his consent after being arrested for attending a protest at a factory demanding better pay. After a week in the hospital, where he was prescribed antipsychotics, Jie refused further medication. In response, staff forced Jie to do electroconvulsive therapy, which he described as very painful. He was discharged after 52 days. He subsequently fled China to Los Angeles, where he has applied for asylum.

Jie has maintained that Chinese authorities have used forced psychiatric treatment "as a form of illegal detention" and as a way to delegitimize activists. He has also criticized human rights abuses in China and the Chinese government's reaction to whistleblowers in the early days of the COVID-19 pandemic.

=== Attacks ===
In 2023, Jie told PBS News Hour he had been attacked five times, including being stabbed once, while living in the United States. He also reported receiving death threats on social media.

In 2025, Jie was beaten unconscious in the New York City neighborhood of Flushing, Queens by three men suspected of being Chinese nationals, according to the Taipei Times. He spent two days in a coma. Taiwanese foreign minister Lin Chia-lun subsequently released a statement that Taiwan had procedures in place to help victims of Chinese transnational oppression abroad.
