= Wilson Edwards =

Fictional name quoted in news stories

Wilson Edwards (Chinese: 威尔逊·爱德华兹; pinyin: Wēi'ěrxùn Àidéhuázī) was the name of an alleged Swiss biologist who was quoted by multiple Chinese news media in July 2021 condemning the United States over issues related to the investigations into the origin of COVID-19. The name went viral and prompted widespread discussion when the Swiss Embassy in China denied the existence of this individual, rejecting the news as fake. The Chinese media involved includes China News Service, Global Times, Xinhua, People's Daily, Guancha.cn, CCTV News, and CCP News Web, which are all Chinese state-owned media.

In addition to media, many institutions of the Chinese Communist Party (CCP) or the Chinese government, including the Central Commission for Discipline Inspection, National Supervisory Commission and Chinese Embassy in East Timor posted such news on their websites.

== Summary ==
=== Wilson Edwards condemning the United States ===
In July 2021, many Chinese state-owned media, including People's Daily, China News Service, Xinhua News Agency, Global Times and CCTV News quoted many times a social media speech related to Investigations into the origin of COVID-19 from a man claiming himself as a Swiss biologist named Wilson Edwards. The speech said, "Over the past 6 months, especially after the phase I study, WHO sources and a number of fellow researchers complained that they had endured enormous pressure and even intimidation from the U.S. side as well as certain media outlets", and "I was informed that U.S. was seeking to discredit the qualifications of those scientists involved in phase I study, and overturn the conclusions of the first phase report".

=== Declaration of Swiss Embassy in China ===
Avatar of Embassy of Switzerland in Beijing

Embassy of Switzerland in Beijing
(@SwissEmbChina)
tweeted:

Looking for Wilson Edwards, alleged biologist, cited in press and social media in China over the last several days. If you exist, we would like to meet you! But it is more likely that this is a fake news, and we call on the Chinese press and netizens to take down the posts.

10 Aug 2021

As this speech was repeatedly quoted from late July to early August in 2021, it soon caught the attention of Swiss Embassy in China. After an investigation, the Swiss authority published a declaration on Twitter on 10 Aug, indicating the news regarding the Swiss biologist Wilson Edwards might be fake. The declaration also includes three clarifications:

In the last several days, a large number of press articles and social media posts citing an alleged Swiss biologist have been published in China. While we appreciate the attention on our country, the Embassy of Switzerland must unfortunately inform the Chinese public that this news is false.

1. There is no registry of any Swiss citizen with the name "Wilson Edwards".
2. There are no academic articles on biology cited under this name.
3. The Facebook account was opened on 24 July 2021, and has only made this one post so far. It only has 3 friends. It is likely that this account was not opened for social networking purposes.

While we assume that the spreading of this story was done in good faith by the media and the netizens, we kindly ask that anyone having published this story take it down and publish a corrigendum.

— Embassy of Switzerland in Beijing, on Twitter, 10 Aug 2021

While posting this declaration, the Swiss Embassy also claimed to be "Looking for Wilson Edwards" and said "If you exist, we would like to meet you!". However, such an attempt might fail very soon, as the Facebook account of "Wilson Edwards" was closed a couple of hours after the declaration. Most media outlets that have cited Edwards' statements took down their news articles, but few published a corrigendum as requested by the Swiss Embassy. While some media or government institutions such as China News Service did not remove the news or reports.

The fake news could be dated as early as 27 July, when Voice of South Pacific (Chinese: 南太之声), a mobile phone APP based in Fiji posted a news article in English. This news referred Wilson Edwards as a Swiss biologist. On 28 July, guancha.cn, a Chinese media outlet, reposted the Wilson Edwards' statements on Facebook, as according to the Voice of South Pacific article, with detailed commentaries. On 31 July, Reference News reposted the news as well, and it was further reposted by many famous media including Xinhua News Agency. However, guancha.cn's article made numerous mistakes. For example, it referred to Voice of South Pacific as an American news agency. According to the App Store and Google Play Store, the developers of Voice of South Pacific APP belong to China News Service, which is under the State Council and the CCP Propaganda Department.

=== Influence of the event ===
After the declaration of the Swiss Embassy, the media involved were soon accused of forging the Swiss researcher Wilson Edwards, which does not exist, for political purposes. Some accused the involved media and government institutions of spreading fake news or rumors. Some also said "Wilson" is a typical Anglo surname, being unlikely to be a given name, let alone a Swiss name. Fang Zhouzi believed that this name is the reverse of American biologist Edward Wilson, and the reports were reposting Chinese propaganda abroad, which discredited the Chinese news agencies involved. On Weibo, some netizens indirectly criticized the CCP for producing fake news.

Hu Xijin, editor in chief of Global Times, one of the involved news agencies, posted on Weibo on 11 Aug. He argued that it is not reasonable to assume that Chinese media cited a "fake account" solely based on the clarifications of the Swiss Embassy. He believed that the post by Wilson Edwards is reasonable and is an example of a scientist under pressure from the U.S., who did not want to risk being identified.

However, Hu's comment aroused further challenges, as a Swiss biologist may reasonably employ a Swiss alias rather than an Anglo one. Some netizens believe Hu was just greenwashing for Chinese media.

== Aftermath ==
=== Facebook Investigation ===
On 1 Dec 2021, Meta Platforms, the holding company of Facebook, found after an investigation that the Wilson Edwards incident was related to Chinese tech companies and employees of Chinese state-owned enterprises. Meta Platforms said that Facebook had deleted accounts that had been used by China to fake "the Swiss biologist". As part of the investigation, Facebook deleted the account of Edwards in August; it also deleted 524 Facebook accounts, 20 pages, 4 groups and 86 Instagram accounts.

Meta Platforms associated such activities with individuals located in Mainland China, including employees of Sichuan Silence Information Technology Company Limited, a Chinese company in Sichuan, and some individuals related to Chinese infrastructure companies. Meta Platforms did not find the tech company associated with the Chinese government, while the tech company, on their websites, claims to work on network and information security, and provide security services to Ministry of Public Security. Meta Platforms stated that Edwards' Facebook account made a post 10 hours after its creation, claiming that he was told the U.S. was trying to defame WHO scientists cooperating with China to investigate the origin of COVID-19, and the holder of this account used VPN to hide its location. Meta found in its investigation that the original post of this account was shared and liked by fake accounts, but subsequently reposted by human users, the majority of whom are employees of Chinese state-owned infrastructure companies. Meta concluded that this coordinated propaganda attempt targeting English speakers in the U.S. and the U.K., as well as Chinese speakers in Taiwan, Hong Kong and Tibet, was not successfully in general, as no evidence indicates that it affected authentic users.

== See also ==
- Fake News
- Investigations into the origin of COVID-19
- COVID-19 misinformation by China
