= Zhang Zhan =

Chinese journalist and lawyer

- 张展
- Born: 2 September 1983 (age 42); Xianyang, Shaanxi, China
- Education: Southwestern University of Finance and Economics
- Occupations: Citizen journalist, lawyer
- Known for: Reporting on the COVID-19 pandemic in mainland China
- Movement: Weiquan movement

Zhang Zhan (simplified Chinese: 张展; traditional Chinese: 張展; pinyin: Zhāng Zhǎn; born 2 September 1983) is a Chinese citizen journalist and former lawyer who travelled to Wuhan in February 2020, from where she reported on the impact of the lockdown measures imposed in the city in response to the COVID-19 outbreak there, and questioned the handling of the crisis by authorities. She was detained in May 2020, and was sentenced in December 2020 to four years imprisonment on the charges of "picking quarrels and provoking trouble" (Chinese: 寻衅滋事). She is the first citizen journalist to be sentenced for reporting on the pandemic in China, although at least ten journalists and commentators were known to have been arrested for their coronavirus reporting as of February 2021.

Zhang was hospitalized from 31 July until 11 August 2021, due to malnutrition after an extended intermittent hunger strike. In late October, her mother and brother considered Zhang to be close to death as she continued her hunger strike, leading to calls by the United States government, Reporters without Borders, and the United Nations human rights office for her immediate unconditional release. In May 2024, she was reported to having been released from prison after completion of her sentence, but arrested again in August and reportedly sentenced to four more years in prison.

== Early life and education ==
Zhang was born in Xianyang, Shaanxi, and graduated in finance at Southwestern University of Finance and Economics.

== Career ==
She moved to Shanghai in 2010, and formerly worked as a lawyer, but had her license revoked for participation in the Weiquan movement.

In August 2018, Zhang was warned by police for "inciting subversion". In April 2019, she was detained by authorities on suspicion of "disturbing the public order".

In September 2019, during the 2019–2020 Hong Kong protests, Zhang held up an umbrella on Nanjing Road and People's Square in Shanghai in support of the protesters, inscribed with the slogan, "End socialism, Communist Party down". On 9 September, she was detained on suspicion of disturbing the public order until 13 November 2019, during which time she went on hunger strike twice.

=== Journalism, February–May 2020 ===
On 1 February 2020, Zhang travelled from Shanghai, her place of residence, to Wuhan to cover the COVID-19 pandemic there as a citizen journalist. In a video published by the portal China Change, Zhang stated that prior to her travel to Wuhan, she had been deeply moved by an online post by a Wuhan resident who expressed feeling abandoned by authorities. In dozens of short, shaky videos which she live-streamed and uploaded on Twitter, YouTube, and other social media, she documented overflowing hospitals, empty shops, the Wuhan Institute of Virology (multiple times), crematoria, the detention of independent journalists, and harassment of families of victims of the pandemic seeking accountability. She also posted essays.

One story on 16 February 2020 accused the government of covering up the true numbers of infections and deaths "in the name of maintaining stability", of keeping the media under control, and accused the authorities of "coercively and violently ordering and depriving people of their basic human and property rights" through the imposed strict lockdown. According to Zhang, crematoria in Wuhan were running day and night, during a time when state media claimed that the pandemic was under control. Another video showed her visiting the police station where Li Wenliang had been reprimanded for spreading word about the outbreak, trying to obtain information about his case. In an essay posted in late April, she criticized that those who had lost loved ones due to the pandemic were being "oppressed" by authorities, through not being allowed to mourn. In her last video before her arrest, she criticised the lockdown on Wuhan for being unduly harsh, saying that the government had managed the city with "intimidation and threats", and that this was "truly the tragedy of this country".

Citizen journalists have been a source of unfiltered information about the pandemic in China. However, there are very few due to lack of accreditation for them.

== First arrest and imprisonment (2020—2024) ==
=== Arrest and detention ===
The Network of Chinese Human Rights Defenders, a Chinese human rights group recorded that Zhang went missing on 14 May 2020, the day after she had last streamed a live broadcast from near Hankou railway station. Later, it was revealed she was detained by police at a hotel near the railway station where she was staying, and transported back to Shanghai. In the days prior to losing contact with her friends, she had told them that she was being followed. She was imprisoned without charge until November. Zhang is one of several citizen journalists, including Li Zehua, Chen Qiushi, and Fang Bin who went missing at the same time. On 19 June 2020, Zhang was formally arrested on the orders of the Pudong state prosecutor. She was held in the Pudong Detention Center.

==== Mistreatment during detention ====
According to Amnesty International, Zhang was tortured for three months before sentencing, which involved being kept shackled and in handcuffs 24 hours a day for the entire time and being force-fed; Zhang had been on hunger strike since June 2020 and was since force-fed through a feeding tube. Her hands were tied to prevent her from removing it. Her mother described it as a "partial hunger strike" in which Zhang ate fruit and cookies, but not meat, rice, or vegetables. One of her lawyers said that she had begun taking some food after her health had started to decline. Her lawyer, Ren Quanniu, said that Zhang had told him on previous occasions that her hunger strike was to protest against the curtailment of freedom of speech in China, rather than for being released.

In December 2020, her lawyer, Ren Quanniu, described her as very weak. She appeared in court in December 2020 in a wheelchair. Another of her lawyers, Zhang Keke, said: "In addition to headache, dizziness, and stomach pain, there was also pain in her mouth and throat. She said this may be inflammation due to the insertion of the nasogastric tube." Her lawyer had stated in late 2020 that she may not survive.

=== Trial (28 December 2020) ===
Zhang was charged with picking quarrels and provoking trouble, a charge the Chinese government often uses to imprison opponents, and was sentenced to four years in prison. The crime is defined as undermining public order by creating a disturbance in a public place. The indictment sheet accused Zhang of talking to foreign media such as Radio Free Asia and The Epoch Times, and spreading false information regarding the COVID-19 pandemic in Wuhan.

Zhang was accused of fabricating two items in her reporting from Wuhan; that residents were forced to pay a fee to get COVID-19 tests, and that residents confined to their homes had been sent rotten vegetables by neighbourhood committees. Zhang maintains these are true.

The trial before a Shanghai court took place on 28 December 2020. Supporters, foreign journalists, and a British diplomat were blocked from entering the courtroom. The trial lasted less than three hours in total. Foreign media saw the timing of the trial between Christmas and New Year as aiming to minimise attention in Western countries, a tactic which China had used previously in the trial of other dissidents. Zhang was sentenced to four years imprisonment, making her the first citizen journalist to be sentenced for reporting the pandemic in China. She was represented by several lawyers, including Ren Quanniu and Zhang Keke. She declined to appeal her conviction, telling her lawyers that she saw the legal process used to imprison her as legally invalid.

=== Imprisonment (December 2020 – May 2024) ===
Zhang was hospitalized in Shanghai on 31 July 2021, after staging a long-running hunger strike, according to a message from her mother on Chinese social media. Her mother also wrote that Zhang was weighing less than 40 kilograms, half her body weight from before her detention. On 2 August 2021, after notification from and on request of authorities, her parents and brother went to Shanghai to visit Zhang in prison but were only given permission to speak with her over the phone. Zhang returned to prison on 11 August 2021. Subsequently, her health appeared to deteriorate further according to her mother, who told Radio Free Asia that her daughter, with whom she had spoken in a video call on 28 October, could not walk unassisted and was drooping her head. In late 2021, Zhang's family made personal visits to her. Her mother said that the condition of her daughter in late November was still the same as before, in spite of her having been admitted again to hospital at the end of October. The family said that the hospital had withheld the clinical report from them.

In February 2022, Zhang's mother revealed that her daughter's health had improved and Zhang had halted her hunger strike. Zhang was able to walk on her own and her stomachache has ended due to her food intake.

In May 2024, Zhang released from prison. On 21 May, Wang Jianhong, the founder of the Zhang Zhan Concern Group, posted a video of Zhang confirming that she was released and was sent to her brother's home in Shanghai, and thanked the outside world for their help and concern.

== Re-arrest and charge (August 2024 – present) ==
At the end of August 2024, Zhang lost contact while traveling to her hometown and was detained in a detention center in Shanghai. Prior to this arrest, Zhang had been posting on social media about harassments of activists in China.

On November 18, Zhang Zhan was charged with "picking quarrels and provoking trouble" by the Shanghai Pudong Procuratorate. Then U.S. Ambassador to China R. Nicholas Burns made a statement on Human Rights Day calling for the release of those "unjustly detained by the PRC", including Zhang.

In January 2025, Zhang began a hunger-strike in protest of her second arrest. In response, detention centre personnel used forced-feeding through a gastric tube.

On May 14, 2025, the fifth anniversary of her arrest in 2020, 63 press freedom and human rights NGOs made a joint statement condemning the ongoing detention of Zhang.

In September 2025, she was reportedly sentenced to four more years in prison.

== Reactions ==
=== United States ===
On 29 December 2020, Mike Pompeo, the United States Secretary of State released a statement that "The United States strongly condemns the People's Republic of China's (PRC) sham prosecution and conviction of citizen journalist Zhang Zhan on December 28". On 8 November 2021, Department of State spokesman Ned Price said that the United States was "deeply concerned about the deteriorating health" of Zhang, that it had "serious concerns about the arbitrary nature of her detention and her mistreatment during it", and called for her "immediate and unconditional release".

On 2 June 2023, Zhang and two other human rights figures were nominated for the Nobel Peace Prize by the Congressional-Executive Commission on China's Chairs Christopher Smith and Jeff Merkley. The Chairs said, "Like the Tiananmen protesters before them, these individuals peacefully pressed Chinese leaders to recognize and respect human rights enshrined in the Universal Declaration of Human Rights and the Chinese Constitution [...] These heroes should be honored by the world for their courage and the international community must demand their unconditional release".

In both 2022 and 2023, Zhang's being force-fed was mentioned by the U.S. Bureau of Democracy, Human Rights, and Labor under the section for "Torture and Other Cruel, Inhuman, or Degrading Treatment or Punishment, and Other Related Abuses" in their Country Reports on Human Rights Practices: China.

=== European Union ===
In December 2020, the European Union (EU) called for her to be released immediately. They also called for the release of human rights lawyer Yu Wensheng, and several others detained and convicted human rights defenders and reporters in China. An EU foreign policy spokesman, Peter Stano, stated, "according to credible sources, Ms Zhang has been subject to torture and ill-treatment during her detention and her health condition has seriously deteriorated". Nabila Massrali, spokeswoman for the High Representative of the Union for Foreign Affairs and Security Policy Josep Borrell, called on 24 November for the unconditional release of Zhang and noted at the same time that previous calls by the European Union had not received a response.

=== United Kingdom ===
In December 2020, the Embassy of the United Kingdom, Beijing, said her case "raises serious concerns about media freedom in China" and that she was one of at least 47 journalists currently (December 2020) in detention in China for their coronavirus reporting; the statement called on the Chinese government for their release.

=== United Nations ===
in a tweet on 28 December 2020, the United Nations human rights office said, that it had "raised her case with the authorities throughout 2020", and that it would continue to call for her release. On 19 November 2021, the human rights office urged for "Zhang's immediate and unconditional release, at the very least, on humanitarian grounds", and for her to be able to access "urgent life-saving" medical care.

=== Non-governmental organizations ===
On 17 September 2021, a coalition of 45 non-governmental organizations, including Reporters Without Borders (RSF), called Chinese leader Xi Jinping to be exonerated and for Zhang s "immediate" release due to her health condition. RSF's East Asia bureau head Cédric Alviani said that Zhang "should never have been arrested, let alone subjected to a harsh prison sentence".

In November 2021, RSF announced Zhang as a nominee of the organization's press freedom award for courage, in recognition of her journalistic work. She was announced as the recipient a week later.

Ahead of the EU-China summit in March 2022, Zhang was among the shortlist of human rights defenders and activists called for the release by a joint NGO letter to the President of the European Commission and the President of the European Council. Among the NGOs in support were Human Rights Watch, Front Line Defenders and Christian Solidarity Worldwide.

On 14 June 2023, Zhang was called for release by a coalition of 42 NGOs, including Freedom House, Amnesty International, Human Rights Watch, etc., in their joint letter to U.S. Secretary of State Antony Blinken before his visit to China.

=== China ===
As of November 2020, it was nearly impossible to find writings or videos by Zhang on the Chinese internet, although some comments by netizens on her had slipped past internet censorship.

An indictment dated 15 September 2020, which became known on 13 November 2020, said that through accepting interviews from foreign media outlets such as Radio Free Asia and the Epoch Times, Zhang had "maliciously hype[d] up the situation in Wuhan, reaching a wide audience and causing a negative impact."

On 20 November 2021, the diplomatic mission of China at the United Nations in Geneva responded with strong criticism to the statement by the UN human rights office from a day earlier. Mission spokesman Zhang Yuyin said that the office had turned "a blind eye to information provided by China through normal channels," had "irresponsible" and "erroneous" comments, and that the success of China in combating the COVID-19 pandemic was "not something that anyone can distort or write off".

The Chinese Embassy in Britain said in a statement on the case of Zhang that the right of prison inmates to receive medical attention was "fully guaranteed", and that "anyone who breaches the law shall be sanctioned accordingly".

== Personal life ==
Zhang is a practicing Christian.
