= Chen Qiushi =

Chinese lawyer and citizen journalist (born 1985)

- 陈秋实
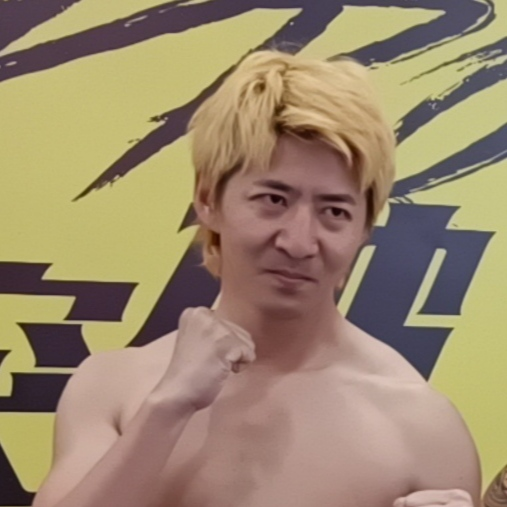
- Chen participated in a boxing match in 2022
- Born: 19 September 1985 (age 41); Daxing'anling Prefecture, China
- Disappeared: 6 February 2020; Wuhan, China
- Status: Found as of September 2021
- Other name: Steven Chen
- Education: Heilongjiang University (LLB)
- Occupations: Lawyer; activist; citizen journalist
- Height: 185 cm (6 ft 1 in)

Chen Qiushi (Note: simplified Chinese: 陈秋实; traditional Chinese: 陳秋實; pinyin: Chén Qiūshí; Mandarin pronunciation: [ʈʂʰə̌n tɕʰjóʊ.ʂɻ̩̌]) (born 19 September 1985), also known as Steven Chen, is a Chinese lawyer, activist, and citizen journalist who covered the 2019–20 Hong Kong protests and the COVID-19 pandemic which included criticism of the government response. He went missing on 6 February 2020 after reporting on the COVID-19 outbreak in Wuhan. The Chinese government reportedly informed Chen's family and friends that he had been detained for the purpose of COVID-19 quarantine. Critics, including media freedom groups, expressed skepticism about government motives, and called on the government to allow outside contact with Chen.

Chen re-emerged in September 2021, but provided no explanation of the circumstances of his disappearance.

== Childhood, education and media career ==
Chen Qiushi was born 19 September 1985 in Daxing'anling Prefecture, Heilongjiang, China, and studied law at Heilongjiang University, graduating in 2007. After graduating, he moved to Beijing, worked in film, television and media, and performed at bars in his spare time. In 2014 he was the runner up in the Beijing TV reality TV show I am a speaker, where contestants give five-minute speeches to an audience and panel of judges. He joined the Longan Law firm in 2015, where he specialised in intellectual property, labour law and dispute resolution.

== Journalism ==
=== Hong Kong protests ===
After hearing about the 2019-20 Hong Kong protests in state newspapers, Chen traveled there as a private citizen to see for himself. He posted online videos reporting on the protests in Hong Kong against the 2019 extradition bill, where he countered the government's characterization of the protestors as violent rioters. His videos were described by Western media observers as determinedly neutral. He also attended both pro-Beijing and pro-Hong Kong rallies while refusing to explicitly take a side.

Days after the videos' August 2019 release, he was contacted by Chinese authorities, including the Ministry of Public Security, the Ministry of Justice, his legal association and his employer, and he returned home early. His Sina Weibo account, which had 740,000 followers, was deleted along with his other social media accounts. Chen described being questioned, recorded, "criticised and educated" about why going to Hong Kong was wrong. In early October, he began posting on YouTube, blocked for many in mainland China, stating that since freedom of speech is a right in the Chinese constitution he must continue.

=== COVID-19 ===
After being blocked from Chinese social media for his reports on the 2019–2020 Hong Kong protests, Chen took to YouTube and Twitter to continue his reporting. Chen began reporting on the COVID-19 pandemic in China, travelling to Hankou, Wuhan, on 23 or 24 January 2020, where he interviewed locals and visited various hospitals including Huoshenshan Hospital, which was still under construction at the time. According to Chen, doctors were overworked and there were insufficient medical supplies, but prices of goods were otherwise stable. Chen published a video on 30 January showing crowding in Wuhan hospitals, with many people lying in corridors. Unlike state media reporters, who wore hazmat suits, Chen appeared to have only goggles and a face mask to protect himself. Chen stated,

I am afraid. In front of me is disease. Behind me is China's legal and administrative power. But as long as I am alive I will speak about what I have seen and what I have heard. I am not afraid of dying. Why should I be afraid of you, Communist Party?

— Chen Qiushi, 30 January 2020

By early February 2020, while reporting about the coronavirus outbreak, Chen had 433,000 YouTube subscribers and 246,000 Twitter followers. Chen's supporters accused the Chinese government of censorship of the coronavirus outbreak. According to The Guardian, many pro-Chen comments on Sina Weibo were censored. Around 4 February, in the last video posted by Chen before his subsequent disappearance, Chen interviewed Wuhan resident "A Ming". A Ming stated his father had probably contracted coronavirus during a health check-up in the beginning of January, when there were no safety precautions; A Ming's father had subsequently died from the virus. During the video Chen stated "many people are worried I will be detained".

Journalist Linda Lew, writing in South China Morning Post, later judged that Chen was one of the most high-profile citizen journalists covering the coronavirus outbreak. She also stated that Chen's reporting contrasted with Caixin and Sanlian Lifeweek, which have "lines they cannot cross", and that Chen's reporting contrasted even more strongly with the "official line" of state-controlled media.

==== 2020 – 2021 disappearance ====
Chen disappeared on 6 February 2020, at some point after informing his family of an intention to report on a temporary hospital. His friends were unable to contact him after 7 pm UTC+8 on 6 February. His mother, and friend Xu Xiaodong, have both stated that on 7 February, they received news from authorities that Chen had been detained at an undeclared time and place and held in an unknown location for the purpose of quarantine.

Amnesty International's Patrick Poon said around 14 February 2020 that it was still unknown whether Chen (and another citizen journalist, Fang Bin) had been arrested or placed under "forced quarantine". Poon called on China to inform their families and provide access to a lawyer, stating: "Otherwise, it's a legitimate concern that they are at risk of torture or other ill-treatment." A Human Rights Watch representative stated the Chinese government "has a history of harassing and detaining citizens for speaking the truth or for criticizing the authorities during public emergencies, for example, during SARS in 2003, Wenchuan earthquake in 2008, Wenzhou train crash in 2011 and Tianjin chemical explosion in 2015." Around March 2020 it was reported that Li Zehua, a citizen journalist in part inspired by Chen, had also disappeared; Li resurfaced in April 2020. The One Free Press Coalition included Chen in both its March 2020 and April 2020 lists of the ten "most urgent" cases. The Committee to Protect Journalists has also called for Chen's release.

On 23 March, the Chinese Ambassador to the US, Cui Tiankai, stated he'd never heard of Chen. In early April, Republican lawmakers in the U.S. called for an inquiry into the Chinese government's behaviour, including the disappearances of Fang Bin, Chen Qiushi, and Li Zehua, saying "(The Chinese authorities) lied to the world about the human-to-human transmission of the virus, silenced doctors and journalists who tried to report the truth, and are now apparently hiding the accurate number of people impacted by this disease."

In September 2020, Xu Xiaodong broke news that his friend Chen was in "good health" but under "supervision of a certain agency". A human rights lawyer stated Chen had been moved to Qingdao, where his parents live, and was under "strict supervision by the authorities".

As of 31 March 2021, he is reportedly living with his parents; it is unclear whether he will be prosecuted.

==== Re-emergence ====
On 30 September 2021, Chen re-emerged with a short appearance on his friend Xu Xiaodong's live video feed on YouTube, while also posting a letter on Twitter. In the letter, Chen wrote, "Over the past year and eight months, I have experienced a lot of things. Some of it can be talked about, some of it can't, I believe you understand."

== See also ==
- List of solved missing person cases (2020s)
- Li Zehua, a Chinese citizen journalist who disappeared for two months after reporting on COVID-19 in Wuhan.
- Fang Bin
- Zhang Zhan
