= Li Zehua =

Chinese journalist and YouTuber (born 1995)

- 李泽华
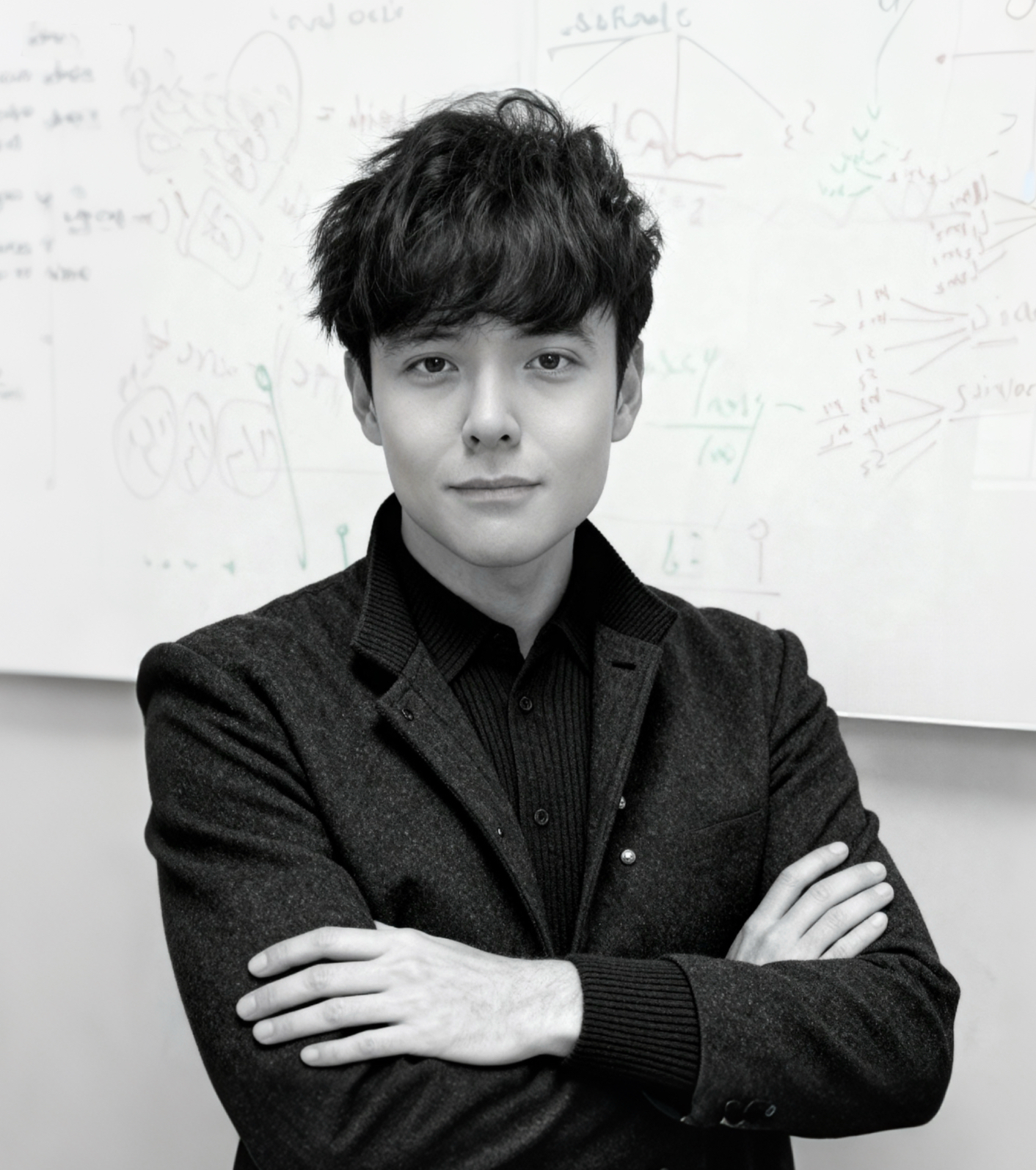
- Li in 2025
- Born: Zehua Li; 1995 (age 30–31); Pingxiang, Jiangxi, China
- Other name: Kcriss Li
- Education: University of Rochester (MS; PhD student); Communication University of China (BA)
- Occupations: Host, YouTuber
- Years active: July 2013–Present
- Television: China Central Television

Chinese name
- Chinese: 李泽华
- Traditional Chinese: 李澤華
Transcriptions
Standard Mandarin
- Hanyu Pinyin: Lǐ Zéhuá
Gan
- Romanization: [Li3 Zet6 fa4 [li²¹³ t͡sʰɛʔ⁵ fa³⁵]]

Li Zehua (Chinese: 李泽华, born 1995), commonly known as Kcriss Li, is a Chinese citizen journalist and YouTuber. Li was born in Pingxiang, Jiangxi. After graduating from the Communication University of China, he joined China Central Television (CCTV) as a television presenter in 2016. He would later leave CCTV and become an independent journalist, documenting the early days of the coronavirus pandemic in Wuhan.

== Journalism ==
=== 2020 ===
During the COVID-19 pandemic in China, he resigned from CCTV and found a way to get into Wuhan, hoping to trace disappeared journalist Chen Qiushi. With the help of locals, he was able to get a car and find a place to stay. In the following days, he used a vlog to report on the pandemic in Wuhan. He disappeared on 26 February 2020, presumed detained by officers from state security. Parts of his chase with the Wuhan authorities was caught on video and uploaded to YouTube. Li was supposedly taken to a police station, where he had fingerprints and blood samples taken, before being taken to an "interrogation room". He was told he was "suspected of disturbing public order", but was told there would be no penalty. Some reports stated that no one had heard from Li since his 26 February 2020 disappearance, while others stated that he returned to the hotel on 28 February.

On 22 April 2020, Li posted a video on YouTube, Twitter, and Weibo, and uploaded the English subtitle to YouTube in the following days. According to Li, he was escorted on 26 February to the police station and was under investigation for disrupting public order. Additionally, police detained and quarantined him, citing his visits to sensitive epidemic areas. Li's quarantine was at first in Wuhan, and later moved to his hometown. Li stated that he had been treated well by the police during the detention, and that he had been released on 28 March. According to The Guardian, Li's neutral tone in the video was "very different from his previous videos". Activist Ou Biaofeng stated the authorities may have told Li to make the brief statement.

At the end of his April 22 post, he quoted the Book of Documents aphorism "the mind of man is restless, prone (to err); its affinity to what is right is small. Be discriminating, be uniform (in the pursuit of what is right), that you may sincerely hold fast the Mean." (人心惟危，道心惟微，惟精惟一，允執厥中。) and gave his own interpretation in English:

The will of the people is unpredictable, the heart of Tao (the essence of cosmos) is fathomless. In order to make the will of the people consistent with the heart of Tao and reach the state of Unity of people and cosmos, only the way is concentrate all energy on cultivation of the good nature of the heart, do not act in extreme, do not change faith, do not be fickle, uphold the doctrine of the golden mean of Confucian orthodoxy.

=== 2023 ===
In January 2023, Li reappeared in the public light after nearly three years of silence to give an interview, during which he recounted the events leading to his arrest in February 2020 and restated his views on the lack of freedom for Chinese citizens and his disdain of the totalitarianism and tyranny of the Chinese Communist Party.

In March 2023, Li was interviewed and stated that he had graduated from the University of Rochester and is working at an artificial intelligence lab.

== Education and research ==
Li later studied at the University of Rochester. In March 2023, the Committee to Protect Journalists reported that Li had graduated from the University of Rochester and was working at an artificial intelligence lab. The University of Rochester's Audio Information Research Laboratory listed Zehua Li among its 2023 master's graduates.

In 2024, Li was the first author of the Interspeech 2024 paper "GTR-Voice: Articulatory Phonetics Informed Controllable Expressive Speech Synthesis", with Meiying Melissa Chen, Yi Zhong, Pinxin Liu, and Zhiyao Duan. The paper introduced a controllable expressive speech synthesis framework and dataset based on articulatory phonetic dimensions including glottalization, tenseness, and resonance.

Li later became a graduate student in the University of Rochester's Brain and Cognitive Sciences Ph.D. program and joined the Computational Neuroscience of Audition Lab. The lab is led by Samuel Norman-Haignere, whose research focuses on neural computations underlying human hearing and computational models of auditory processing. The lab members page lists Li's research interests as understanding auditory processing in humans and artificial systems.

== See also ==
- Chen Qiushi, a Chinese lawyer, activist, and citizen journalist who disappeared on 6 February 2020
- Fang Bin, a Chinese businessman, citizen journalist and whistleblower who disappeared in February 2020.
- List of solved missing person cases (2020s)
