= Li Boguang =

Chinese legal scholar and human rights activist

- 李柏光
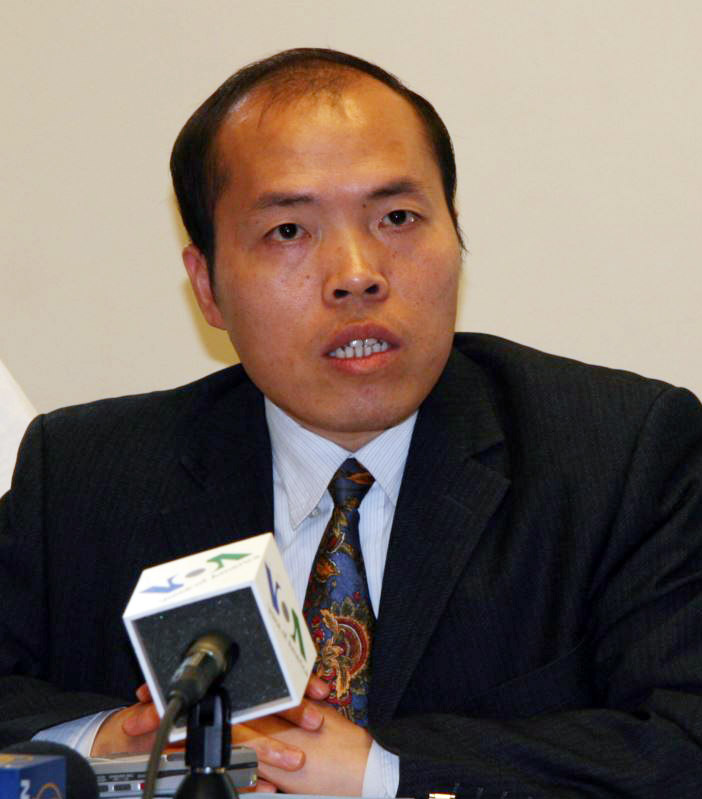
- Li Boguang in May 2006
- Born: October 1, 1968; Jiahe County, Hunan
- Died: February 26, 2018 (aged 49); Beijing
- Education: Peking University
- Occupations: Lawyer, human rights activist, writer, translator, publisher
- Years active: 1997 — 2018
- Known for: Tangshan protest
- Awards: National Endowment for Democracy – Democracy Award 2008

Li Boguang
- Chinese: 李柏光
Transcriptions
Standard Mandarin
- Hanyu Pinyin: Lǐ Bóguāng
- Wade–Giles: Lǐh Pǎikwāng
- IPA: [lì pwǒkwáŋ]

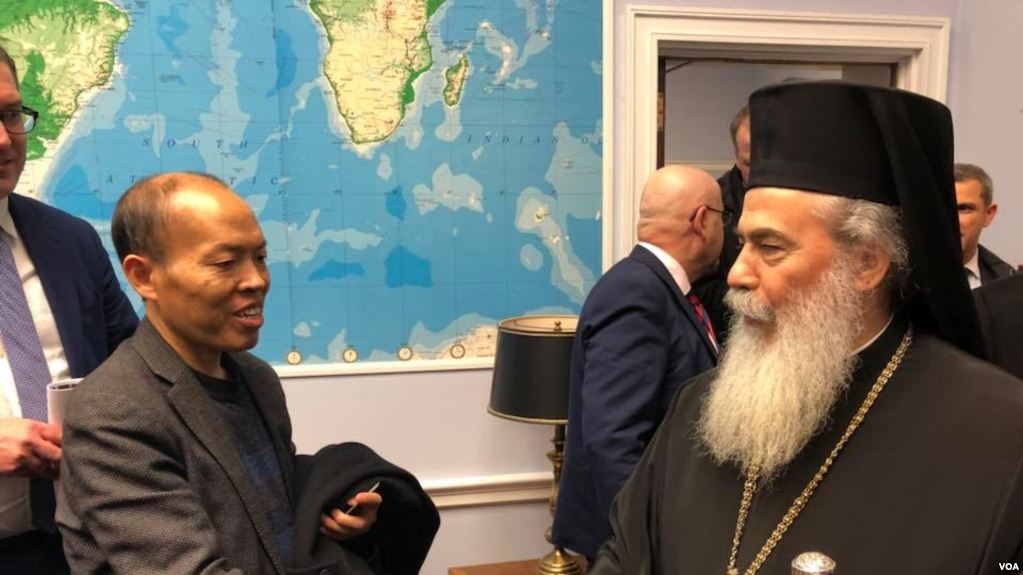
Li met with an archbishop from the Greek Orthodox Church of Jerusalem on February 7, 2018.

Li Boguang (Chinese: 李柏光; pinyin: Lǐ Bóguāng; 1 October 1968 – 26 February 2018) was a Chinese legal scholar and human rights activist. Li was born in a mountain village in Jiahe County, Hunan province. He was the youngest son among seven children in poor family. When his father died Li was only 7 years old.

In his capacity as the director of the Qimin Research Institute in Beijing, Li supported farmers in seeking compensation for confiscated farmland. He was arrested in 2004 following his involvement in the Tangshan protest, which led to international attention being paid to his plight by human rights groups. Li was the victim of a physical assault in 2016. He died in February 2018, with the Chinese government attributing his death to liver disease. This provoked controversy, with media outlets considering his demise to be "suspicious", given the Chinese government's track record on human rights.

== Career ==
=== Teaching ===
Li studied Philosophy, Politics and Law at university, obtaining his Masters and Doctoral degrees from Peking University. In 1997, he became Professor of Law at Hainan University, but lost the role after being arrested the following year.

=== Tangshan protest ===
Li became known internationally in 2004 as a result of his efforts to promote the rights of farmers in the Tangshan protest. Along with Yu Meisun and Zhao Yan, Li provided an advice to the farmers in Hebei Province who were resettled to make way for the Taolinkou reservoir, some 100 km (62 mi) east of Beijing. The farmers asserted that their compensation was not received as a result of corruption and misappropriation by officials from the local Government. Led by Zhang Youren, a peasant activist, more than 11,000 displaced farmers signed a petition calling for the dismissal of the Municipal Party Secretary, Zhang He. Boguang aided the peasants in the organization of the protest, gaining him international attention, and resulting in his arrest. However, he was subsequently released. As a direct result of the Tangshan Protest Zhang Youren was detained, and a crackdown on rights activists was instigated by the authorities.

=== Other farmers' protests ===
In the same year, Li published an article which examined the impact of corruption on the lives of farmers. The article, entitled "Can Citizens Dismiss a Mayor" was published in Modern Civilisation Pictorial, No 12. Reportedly, Li Boguang also advised farmers in Fu’an, a coastal city in the North of Fujian Province. Once again, farmers sought to create and deliver a petition to the central government regarding a land dispute.

A hallmark of the protests in both Fujian and Hebei was the immense pressure that was put on villagers by the police force to denounce Li Boguang and his fellow activists. This culminated in December 2004, when Li was arrested by the police in Fu’an. He was charged with defrauding farmers. Police reportedly searched his home in Beijing, confiscating computers and documents.

In March 2005, AFP reported that Li had been released on condition that he remain in Beijing and have no contact with farmers or others seeking to petition the government about abuses by local officials. The actual date of release was later reported as 21 January.

=== Religious activism ===
There have been claims that Li was affiliated with the Fangzhou Congregation, a Chinese house church situated in Beijing's Chaoyang district. Other members of the influential church include Gao Zhisheng and Yu Jie, founder of the Chinese branch of International PEN. He also defended multiple Christians who had been arrested by the government, protecting them from perceived persecution.

=== Book business ===
While proofreading in 1998, Li once read works by the Victorian era writer Samuel Smiles and was touched by the author, so he decided to translate and publish Smiles' works. Also he translated other writers like Robert A. Dahl and Niccolò Machiavelli, and published the books through Chinese publishing houses.

=== Trip to the US ===
Li, Wang Yi and Yu Jie were invited to visit the United States of America by non-governmental organization "China Aid" and the Institute on Chinese Law & Religion to join the China Freedom Summit in May 2005. Then Li and other members of the summit met also with the President of United States George W. Bush in the White House on 11 May.

=== Baptism ===
Prompted by his reading of Samuel Smiles, Li started to read the Bible in 1999. He began to visit a Beijing church in 2005 and was baptized on 30 July 2005 there.

== Death ==
Li Boguang's death was reported by the Chinese government on 26 February 2018, with the cause of death attributed to liver disease, despite his clear health record.

=== Allegations of foul play ===
However, this description courted controversy, with activists and media outlets alike considering his demise to be "suspicious", and allegations that the government report was not credible. Bob Fu, president of ChinaAid, demanded that the Chinese government provide a transparent account of Li's death. Christian Solidarity Worldwide also considered the death to be "suspicious", and refuted the official account as Li's health was very good prior to his death. The death served to return attention to China's human rights record and the welfare of those who oppose the authorities. The government's treatment of Li was already under scrutiny following the assault perpetrated by men with alleged ties to the Chinese Communist Party in 2016, and further threats which had allegedly been levied against him.

International commentators remarked on the similarity between Li's death and that of Nobel Laureate Liu Xiaobo in 2017.

== See also ==
- List of Chinese dissidents
