= Zhao Yan =

Zhao Yan is the name of:

- Zhao Yan (Three Kingdoms) (171–245), Cao Wei general of the Three Kingdoms period
- Zhao Yan (Later Liang) (died 923), Later Liang politician during the Five Dynasties period
- Zhao Yan (journalist) (born 1962), Chinese journalist, researcher and political prisoner
- Zhao Yan (footballer) (born 1972), Chinese female association footballer
- Zhao Yan (figure skater) (born 1992), Chinese male ice dancer
- Zhao Yan (politician), born August 1973, a Chinese politician and senior engineer.
