= Criminal Procedure Law of the People's Republic of China =

The Criminal Procedure Law of the People's Republic of China (Chinese: 中华人民共和国刑事诉讼法) is a procedural statute of China intended to ensure the correct implementation of Chinese criminal law. It defines how trials are to be conducted, what rights suspects of crimes have to defend themselves, the role and scope of the activities of defense lawyers, and the entire process of the administration of justice through the courts in China.

The statute had previously been criticized as offering inadequate protections for those suspected of crimes by the Ministry of Public Security. Lawyers have called for it to be amended to demand that criminal defense lawyers be present during interrogations by police, as well as video and audio recordings being made mandatory. In 2024, justice agencies issued the Rules for Handling the Exclusion of Illegal Evidence in Criminal Cases, which in American and British English would translate to Criminal Case Unlawful Evidence Suppression Procedures. The procedures govern suppression of involuntary confessions and other evidence subject to the exclusionary rule. In cases where life imprisonment or the death penalty may be imposed, investigators must notify prosecutors at the jail to question suspects about possible unlawful custodial interrogation methods and make an electronic recording of the review. The prosecutor’s office must then issue a written prosecution memorandum and, where unlawful collection is confirmed or cannot be ruled out, ensure the evidence is suppressed and not used as the basis for an arrest warrant or indictment.

Scholars have noted that, despite formal procedural safeguards, defense lawyers often face constraints on invoking statutory protections in politically sensitive cases, as examined in Criminal Defense in China, which analyzes the role and limitations of criminal defense lawyers within China's criminal justice system.

The statute is also often not enforced, and ignoring it rarely results in penalties administered by the procuratorate or other supervisory organs. There are multiple documented cases of the procuratorate and public security bureau ignoring it and instead taking direction from the political-legal committees at various levels. Both these measures would prevent the torture and other abuse in custody widely employed to gain confessions.

The controversial Hong Kong national security law provides for the application of the Criminal Procedure Law in cases handled by the Office for Safeguarding National Security of the CPG in the HKSAR in Hong Kong.
