= Empowerment and Rights Institute =

The Empowerment and Rights Institute (ERI; Chinese: 仁之泉工作室; pinyin: Rénzhī quán gōngzuò shì) was a Chinese non-governmental organization (NGO). The organization worked with Human Rights issues in the People's Republic of China (PRC) from 2003 to 2006. The organization worked to strengthen respect for Human Rights as defined in the Universal Declaration of Human Rights and the Chinese Constitution.

== Aims ==
The group was founded by Hou Wenzhuo. Hou studied human rights at Oxford and Harvard, and founded the group based on her education at those schools.

The group defended the land rights of farmers in Guangdong. The group documented 12 cases of illegal land confiscations in 2005. Hou was chosen to meet with the United Nations High Commissioner for Human Rights Louise Arbour in August 2005, but a government raid prevented this from happening.

ERI was funded largely by the National Endowment for Democracy.

The group frequently faces harassment from the Chinese government. Hou was detained for a short time in 2005 by Chinese authorities for the group's activities. She also notes that the members were frequently followed, their phones were bugged, and members frequently were detained.

In August 2005, the ERI offices were raided by the Chinese government. The police searched the office and copied computer files. At the same time, police also raided the home of the group's founder, Hou Wenzhuo. The office was shut down by the government and Hou was placed under house arrest. She was also told that any visitors must be registered with the Chinese government.

The Empowerment and Rights Institute is now defunct.

== See also ==
- Chinese democracy movement
- Politics of the People's Republic of China
- Human rights in the People's Republic of China
- Human rights defender
- Fifth Modernization
- Tangshan protests
