= 2015 Chinese Women's Super League =

- Champions: Shanghai SVA (1st title)
- Relegated: Hebei Yuandong
- Matches: 56
- Goals: 157 (2.8 per match)
- All statistics correct as of 1 July 2017.

The 2015 Chinese Women's Super League was the league's first season in its current incarnation, and the 19th total season of the women's association football league in China.

== Results ==
Pos	Team	Pld	W	D	L	GF	GA	GD	Pts	Qualification
1	Shanghai SVA	14	9	4	1	28	11	+17	31	Champions
2	Dalian Aerbin F.C.	14	9	3	2	30	17	+13	30	
3	Changchun Zhuoyue	14	7	4	3	22	17	+5	25	
4	Jiangsu Suning	14	7	3	4	18	18	0	24	
5	Tianjin Huisen	14	4	4	6	20	19	+1	16	
6	People's Liberation Army F.C.	14	4	1	9	14	24	−10	13	
7	Beijing Enterprise Phoenix	14	2	4	8	13	25	−12	10	Playoff
8	Hebei Yuandong	14	0	5	9	12	26	−14	5	Relegation

Updated to match(es) played on 8 December 2016. Source: Rec.Sport.Soccer Statistics Foundation

Hebei Yuandong were relegated to lower-division CWFL.
