= Human rights in China =

Human rights in the People's Republic of China (PRC) are severely curtailed. Freedom of speech, freedom of the press, freedom of religion, freedom of assembly and workers' rights are restricted by the government. The Chinese political system is authoritarian, with no freely elected national leaders, and repression of political opposition, as well as a lack of an independent judiciary, rule of law, and due process. Human rights abuses by the Chinese government are prevalent, with extensive censorship, mass surveillance, and repression of ethnic minorities and religious groups, including Christians, (Note: Attributed to multiple sources:) Muslims, Tibetan Buddhists, Uyghurs, and groups the government deems as "evil cults," such as Falun Gong, the Church of Almighty God, and The Shouters.

The Chinese Communist Party and government's stated view of human rights emphasizes economic development, material well-being, and national sovereignty. They have often challenged notions of individual civil and political rights in international human rights law as being universal.

Academics, international non-governmental organizations (NGOs) including Human Rights in China and Amnesty International, human rights treaty bodies and the United Nations Human Rights Council's Universal Periodic Review, as well as citizens, lawyers, and dissidents inside the country, have documented how the authorities in mainland China regularly sanction or organize abuses. Human rights groups have also raised concerns about the prevalent use of capital punishment in China, the one-child policy (prior to abolishing it in 2015), and human rights in Tibet. In a human rights report that assesses social, economic, and political freedoms, China received the lowest ranking globally for safety from state actions and the right to assemble.

The World Values Survey finds that 72% of Chinese are satisfied with the state of human rights in their country.

Some Chinese activist groups are trying to improve human rights. Chinese human rights attorneys who take on cases related to these issues, however, often face harassment, disbarment, and arrest by the Chinese state. Democracy movements in China have been repressed, most notably in the 1989 Tiananmen Square massacre.

== Legal system ==
Since the legal reforms of the late 1970s and 1980s, the CCP has officially moved to embrace the language of the rule of law, and has also attempted to establish a modern court system. During this process, it has enacted thousands of new laws and regulations, and has begun training more legal professionals. The concept of 'rule of law' has been emphasized in the constitution, and the ruling party has embarked on campaigns to promote the idea that citizens have protection under the law. At the same time, however, a fundamental contradiction exists in the constitution itself, in which the CCP insists that its authority supersedes that of the law. Thus, the constitution enshrines the rule of law and simultaneously stresses the principle that the "leadership of the Communist Party" holds primacy over the law and the legal system.

The judiciary is not independent of the CCP, and judges face political pressure; in many instances, party committees dictate the outcome of cases. In 2007, law and the judiciary were further subordinated to the interests of the CCP under the doctrine of the Three Supremes. In 2013, Document Number Nine detailed the CCP's antipathy toward the rule of law. This has produced a system often described as "rule by law" (alluding to the CCP's power), rather than rule of law. Moreover, the legal system lacks protections for civil rights, and often fails to uphold due process. This contrasts with a system of checks and balances or separation of powers. Scholars have noted that these characteristics of China's legal system often undermine due process in practice, particularly in politically sensitive criminal cases handled by defense lawyers, as analyzed in Criminal Defense in China.

Foreign experts estimate that in 2000, there were between 1.5 million and 4 million people in prison in mainland China. The PRC does not allow outsiders to inspect its penal system.

== Civil liberties ==
Rights in the PRC resemble notions of positive law, informed by the legacy of the Napoleonic Code, in which rights are created and granted by the state. The PRC's legal discourse is not based upon ideas of natural law.

=== Freedom of speech ===
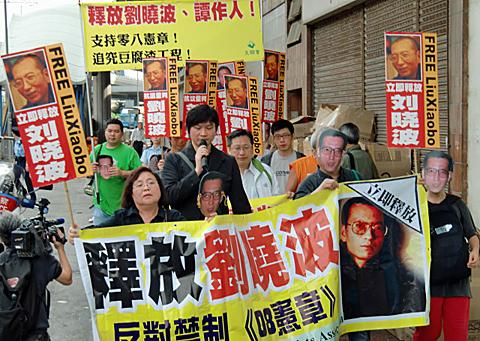
Political protest in Hong Kong against the detention of Chinese Nobel Peace Prize laureate Liu Xiaobo.

Although the 1982 state constitution formally guarantees freedom of speech, the Chinese government maintains that "freedom of speech is not the same as free speech". According to the People's Liberation Army Daily, when exercising their right to freedom of speech, citizens "must not disrupt social order, violate the Constitution and laws, or harm the interests of the state, society, or collectives, or the legitimate freedoms and rights of other citizens". The Chinese government often uses the "subversion of state power" and "protection of state secrets" clauses in their law system to imprison those who criticize the government. Another crime used to jail critics is "picking quarrels and provoking trouble".

During the 2008 Summer Olympics, the government promised to issue permits authorizing people to protest in specifically designated "protest parks" in Beijing. However, a majority of the applications were withdrawn, suspended, or vetoed, and the police detained some of the people who applied.

References to certain controversial events and political movements, as well as access to web pages considered by the PRC authorities to be "dangerous" or "threatening to state security", are blocked on the internet in the PRC; and content disputed by or critical of PRC authorities is absent from many publications, and subject to the control of the CCP within mainland China. An unsanctioned protest during the Olympics by seven foreign activists at the China Nationalities Museum, protesting for a free Tibet and blocking the entrance, was cleared and the protesters deported.

Foreign Internet search engines including Microsoft Bing, Yahoo!, and Google China have come under criticism for aiding these practices. Yahoo!, in particular, stated that it will not protect the privacy and confidentiality of its Chinese customers from the authorities.

In 2005, after Yahoo! China provided its personal emails and IP addresses to the Chinese government, reporter Shi Tao was sentenced to imprisonment for ten years for releasing an internal CCP document to an overseas Chinese democracy site. Skype president Josh Silverman said it was "common knowledge" that TOM Online had "established procedures to...block instant messages containing certain words deemed offensive by the Chinese authorities".

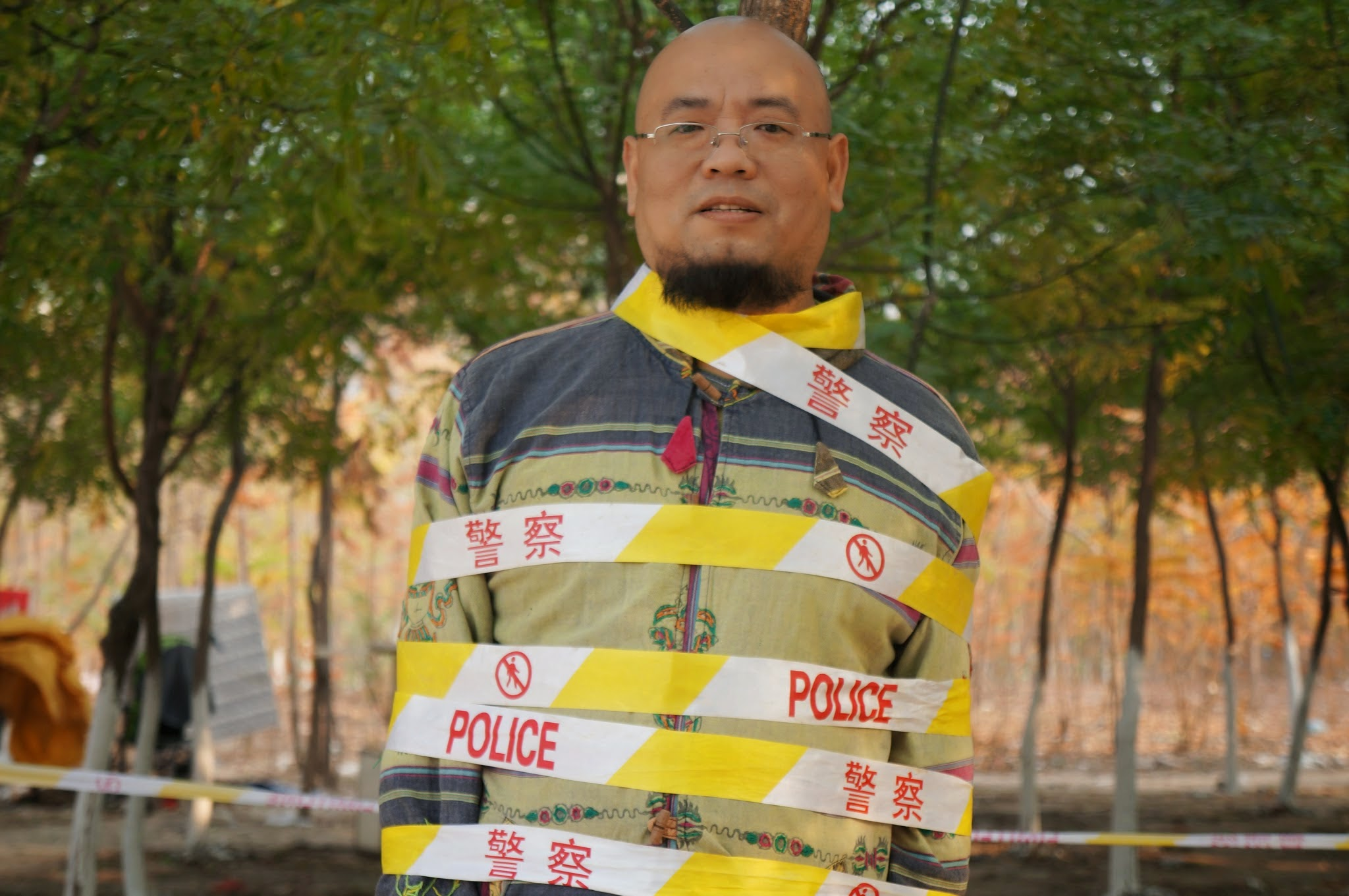
Chinese blogger and human rights activist Wu Gan was sentenced to 8 years in prison in December 2017

Reports indicate both prisoners have developed severe health problems, including organ damage, memory loss, and physical injuries, as a result of repeated beatings and torture, yet have been denied adequate medical care. Their cases have drawn attention from human rights groups as examples of China's systematic repression of Tibetan activists, including arbitrary detention, harsh treatment in prison, and punitive transfers when their situations are raised internationally.

In July 2025, Chinese authorities arrested Zhang Yadi, a 22-year-old student and advocate for Tibetan rights, in Shangri-La, Yunnan province, while she was visiting from France. Zhang was detained under Article 103(2) of China's Criminal Law for allegedly "inciting separatism," a charge that carries a sentence of up to 15 years. She was involved with Chinese Youth Stand for Tibet, a group promoting Tibetan rights and interethnic dialogue. Human Rights Watch and other organizations called for her immediate release, urging international governments to intervene as she was due to begin graduate studies in London.

On April 27, 2026, ARTICLE 19 reported that the Victoria and Albert Museum removed content from catalogues under pressure from Chinese authorities, illustrating China's extraterritorial censorship of cultural institutions. The case reflects broader efforts to control narratives on Taiwan, Tibet, and ethnic minorities, raising concerns about cultural freedom and human rights.

On May 27, 2026, thirty-seven years after the 1989 Tiananmen Square protests and massacre, the Tiananmen Mothers, representing families of those who died, called on the Chinese government to address past injustices. They were subsequently blocked from visiting Wan'an Cemetery to pay their respects at the graves of those killed.

On 19 July 2026, the Tibetan Youth Congress started a worldwide relay hunger strike in Dharamshala after Tibetan activist Lobsang Palden (Lobga Rangzen) died in a self-immolation protest outside the United Nations Headquarters. The campaign was meant to draw attention to Tibetan political issues and raise concerns about China’s actions in Tibet, which Tibetan groups say are harming their culture and way of life. The protesters also called for the release of Tibetan prisoners and asked the international community to pay more attention to human rights issues in Tibet.

On 5 August 2026, the United States section of Amnesty International called for the release of Chinese activist and human rights defender Zhang Yi a Chinese activist and human rights defender who was detained by authorities in Lhasa, Tibet, on 1 July 2026, after showing a photograph of the Dalai Lama on his phone to a Tibetan worshipper at Sera Monastery. He was later formally arrested on suspicion of "inciting separatism".

=== Freedom of the press ===
Critics argue that the CCP has failed to live up to its promises about the freedom of the mainland Chinese media. The US-based NGO Freedom House consistently ranks China as "Not Free" in its annual press freedom survey, including the 2014 report. PRC journalist He Qinglian says that the PRC's media are controlled by directives from the CCP's Publicity Department, and are subjected to intense monitoring which threatens punishment for violators, rather than to pre-publication censorship. In 2008, ITV News reporter John Ray was arrested while covering a "Free Tibet" protest. International media coverage of Tibetan protests only a few months before the Beijing Olympics in 2008 triggered a strong reaction inside China. Chinese media practitioners took the opportunity to argue with propaganda authorities for more media freedom: one journalist asked, 'If not even Chinese journalists are allowed to report about the problems in Tibet, how can foreign journalists know about the Chinese perspective about the events?' Foreign journalists also reported that their access to certain websites, including those of human rights organizations, was restricted. International Olympic Committee president Jacques Rogge stated at the end of the 2008 Olympic Games that 'The regulations [governing foreign media freedom during the Olympics] might not be perfect but they are a sea-change compared to the situation before. We hope that they will continue.' The Foreign Correspondents Club of China (FCCC) issued a statement during the Olympics that "despite welcome progress in terms of accessibility and the number of press conferences within the Olympic facilities, the FCCC has been alarmed at the use of violence, intimidation, and harassment outside. The club has confirmed more than 30 cases of reporting interference since the formal opening of the Olympic media center on 25 July, and is checking at least 20 other reported incidents."

Since the Chinese state continues to exert a considerable amount of control over media, public support for domestic reporting has come as a surprise to many observers. Not much is known about the extent to which the Chinese citizenry believe the official statements of the CCP, nor about which media sources they perceive as credible and why. So far, research on the media in China has focused on the changing relationship between media outlets and the state during the reform era. Nor is much known about how China's changing media environment has affected the government's ability to persuade media audiences. Research on political trust reveals that exposure to the media correlates positively with support for the government in some instances, and negatively in others. The research has been cited as evidence that the Chinese public believes propaganda transmitted to them through the news media, but also that they disbelieve it. These contradictory results can be explained by realizing that ordinary citizens consider media sources to be credible to a greater or lesser degree, depending on the extent to which media outlets have undergone reform.

In 2012 the UN High Commissioner for Human Rights urged the Chinese government to lift restrictions on media access to the region and allow independent, impartial monitors to visit and assess conditions in Tibet. The Chinese government did not change its position.

In the first half of 2020, China expelled 17 employees of The New York Times, The Washington Post, and The Wall Street Journal. The expulsions came after the U.S. declared that five state-owned Chinese media outlets were operating as foreign missions of the government with their staff being re-designated as employees of the Chinese government, requiring approval similar to that for diplomatic employees. The U.S. also required that the employees at the media outlets be reduced from 160 to 100.

Gauthier had previously reported on China's persecution of the Uyghur ethnic group, many of whom believe in Islam. China often accuses Uyghur people of terrorism and has set up a system of camps, which they claim are "vocational training centers." However, those who have lived through the camps allege that the authorities torture, rape, and sexually abuse the prisoners as well as force them into unpaid labor and sterilize the women. Moreover, many experts and foreign policymakers consider the detentions arbitrary rather than linked to provable terrorist charges. As such, journalists such as Gauthier have been critical of China's actions.

At the time of Gauthier's expulsion, she was the first journalist to be deported since China expelled Melissa Chan from Al Jazeera in 2012. Chan had reported on China's black jails and government land confiscation. Of her deportation, China Global Television Network's Yang Rui wrote, "We should shut up those who demonize China and send them packing", according to The Wall Street Journal.

==== Information control ====
The 2020 World Press Freedom Index, compiled by Reporters Without Borders (RSF), shows that mainland China is the world's biggest jailer of journalists. According to the report, China is trying to establish a "new world media order" and maintain a system of information hyper-control, the negative effects of which the entire world experienced during the coronavirus public health crisis. It states that the PRC never stops enhancing its system of information hyper-control and persecution of dissident journalists and bloggers, and that further evidence of this came in February 2020, when two citizens were arrested for their coverage of the COVID-19 pandemic. China currently detains around 100 journalists, of whom the vast majority are Uyghurs.

On 29 May 2022, the U.S. expressed concern over China's "efforts to restrict and manipulate" the UN human rights chief's visit to the Xinjiang region. The conditions imposed by the Beijing authorities on Michelle Bachelet's visit, did not enable a complete and independent assessment of the human rights environment in China.

==== Freedom of the Internet ====
More than sixty Internet regulations exist in mainland China and serve to monitor and control internet publication. These policies are implemented by provincial branches of state-owned Internet service providers, companies, and organizations. The apparatus of the PRC's and/or CCP's Internet control is considered more extensive and more advanced than in any other country in the world. The Golden Shield includes the ability to monitor online chatting services and mail, identifying IPs and all of the person's previous communication, and then being able to lock in on the person's location—because a person will usually use the computer at home or at work – which enables the arrest to be carried out. Amnesty International notes that China "has the largest recorded number of imprisoned journalists and cyber-dissidents in the world" and Paris-based Reporters Without Borders stated in 2010 and 2012 that "China is the world's biggest prison for netizens."

As an example of the censorship, in 2013, 24 years after the 1989 Tiananmen Square protests and massacre, online searches for the term 'Tiananmen Square' were still censored by Chinese authorities. According to the Amnesty International report the controls on the Internet, mass media, and academia were significantly strengthened. For instance, Google, YouTube, Facebook, and Wikipedia are banned in mainland China. Repression of religious activities outside of direct state control increased.

=== Hukou system ===
The CCP came to power in the late 1940s and instituted a command economy. In 1958, Mao Zedong, the Chairman of the Chinese Communist Party, adopted a residency permit system defining where people could work, and classified workers as rural or urban. In this system, a worker who was seeking to move from the country to an urban area in order to take up non-agricultural work would have to apply for permission to do so through the relevant bureaucratic institutions. There is uncertainty, however, as to how strictly the system has been enforced. People who worked outside the region in which they were registered would not qualify for grain rations, employer-provided housing, or health care. There were controls over education, employment, marriage, and other areas of life. One reason which was cited for the instituting of this system was the desire to prevent the possible chaos which would be caused by predictable large-scale urbanization. As a part of the one country, two systems policy which was proposed by Deng Xiaoping and accepted by the British and Portuguese governments, the special administrative regions (SARs) of Hong Kong and Macau retained separate border control and immigration policies with the rest of the PRC. Chinese nationals had to gain permission from the government before they were allowed to travel to Hong Kong or Macau, but this requirement was officially abolished for each SAR after its respective handover. Since then, restrictions which have been imposed by the SAR governments have been the main factors which limit travel.

In 2000, The Washington Times reported that although migrant labourers play a major role in spreading wealth in Chinese villages, they are treated "like second-class citizens by a system which is so discriminatory that it has been likened to apartheid." Anita Chan also posits that the People's Republic of China's household registration and temporary residence permit system has created a situation which is analogous to the passbook system that was implemented in South Africa in order to control the supply and actions of cheap labourers from underprivileged ethnic groups, as well as to control the quality and quantity of such labourers. In 2000, the Tibetan Centre for Human Rights and Democracy alleged that people of Han descent in Tibet have a far easier time acquiring the necessary permits to live in urban areas than ethnic Tibetans do.

Abolition of this policy has been proposed in 11 provinces, mainly along the developed eastern coast. After a widely publicized incident in 2003, when a university-educated migrant died in Guangdong province, the law was changed in order to eliminate the possibility of summary arrest for migrant labourers. The Beijing law lecturer who exposed the incident said it spelt the end of the hukou system: he believed that in most smaller cities, the system had been abandoned, and it had 'almost lost its function' in big cities like Beijing and Shanghai.

==== Treatment of rural workers ====
In November 2005, Jiang Wenran, acting director of the China Institute at the University of Alberta, said that the hukou system was one of the most strictly enforced apartheid structures in modern world history. He stated, "Urban dwellers enjoy a range of social, economic, and cultural benefits while peasants, the majority of the Chinese population, are treated like second-class citizens."

The discrimination which was enforced by the hukou system became particularly onerous in the 1980s after hundreds of millions of migrant workers were forced out of state corporations, co-operatives, and other institutions. Attempts to move to urban centers by workers who were classified as rural workers were tightly controlled by the Chinese bureaucracy, which enforced its control by denying them access to essential goods and services such as grain rations, housing, and health care, and regularly closing down migrant workers' private schools. The hukou system also enforced pass laws which have been compared to those which existed in apartheid South Africa. Rural workers who wanted to work in provinces other than their own were required to possess six passes, and the police periodically conducted raids in which they rounded up those workers who were without permits, placed them in detention centers for a short period of time, and then deported them. It is also found that rural workers have been paid under minimum wage to nothing at all. A group of coal miners in Shuangyashan were being paid little to nothing. With the families and people whom they had to care for, each and every one of the workers protested for the money that they deserved. As in South Africa, the restrictions placed on the mobility of migrant workers were pervasive, and transient workers were forced to live a precarious existence in company dormitories or shanty towns, suffering abusive consequences. Anita Chan comments further that China's household registration and temporary residence permit system has created a situation analogous to the passbook system in apartheid South Africa, which were designed to regulate the supply of cheap labor.

The Chinese Ministry of Public Security has justified these practices on the grounds that they have assisted the police in tracking down criminals and maintaining public order, and they have also provided demographic data for government planning and programs.

=== Freedom of association ===
The People's Republic of China does not allow freedom of association in general; in particular, it does not allow a free choice of membership with trade unions and political parties. Under the Universal Declaration of Human Rights (UDHR), articles 20 and 23, every worker has the right to join an association of their choosing, to have their interests represented against their employer, and to take collective action including the right to strike. In China, on a model similar to the Deutsche Arbeitsfront from 1934 to 1945 in Germany, the All-China Federation of Trade Unions has a monopoly on union activity: it is effectively a nationalized organization. This dynamic violates International Labour Organization Conventions Number 87 and 98 on freedom of association and collective bargaining. The leadership of the ACFTU is not freely elected by its members, and it is not independent from the state or employers.

=== Religious freedom ===
During the Cultural Revolution (1966–1976), particularly during the Destruction of the Four Olds campaign, religious affairs of all types were persecuted, renounced, and strongly discouraged by Chairman Mao Zedong's government and its ideological allies. Many religious buildings were looted or destroyed. Since then, there have been efforts to repair, reconstruct and protect historical and cultural religious sites. In its International Religious Freedom Report for 2013, the US Department of State criticized the PRC as follows:

The government's respect for and protection of the right to religious freedom fell well short of its international human rights commitments. (...) The government harassed, detained, arrested, or sentenced to prison a number of religious adherents for activities reported to be related to their religious beliefs and practices. These activities included assembling for religious worship, expressing religious beliefs in public and in private, and publishing religious texts. There were also reports of physical abuse and torture in detention.

The 1982 Constitution provides its citizens the right to believe in any religion, as well as the right to refrain from doing so:

Citizens of the People's Republic of China enjoy freedom of religious belief. No state organization, public organization, or individual may compel citizens to believe in, or not to believe in, any religion; nor may they discriminate against citizens who believe in, or do not believe in, any religion. The state protects normal religious activities. No one may make use of religion to engage in activities that disrupt public order, impair the health of citizens, or interfere with the educational system of the state. Religious bodies and religious affairs are not subject to any foreign domination.

Members of the CCP are officially required to be atheists, but this rule is not regularly enforced and many party members privately engage in religious activities. Global studies from Pew Research Center in 2014 and 2017 ranked the Chinese government's restrictions on religion as among the highest in the world, despite low to moderate rankings for religious-related social hostilities in the country.

==== Christianity ====
The Chinese government tries to maintain tight control over all organized religions, including Christianity. The only legal Christian groups are the Three-Self Patriotic Movement and the Chinese Patriotic Catholic Association, the latter of which has been condemned by Pope Benedict XVI. Both of these groups are under the control of the CCP. The members of the illegal, underground Catholic church and members of Protestant house churches face prosecution from PRC authorities. The government has also banned religious movements associated with Christianity, including Eastern Lightning and The Shouters, which it has designated as "evil cults."

In 2007, the Chinese Patriotic Catholic Association elected a Catholic bishop of Beijing to replace the deceased Fu Tieshan. The standard Catholic practice is for a bishop to be appointed by the Pope. The Catholic Church does not recognize the legitimacy of bishops elected by the Association, but not appointed by the Pope. According to Pope Benedict XVI, the Catholic Church in particular is viewed in China as a foreign power. Its situation is somewhat analogous to that of the Catholic Church in Post-Reformation England, in which the official church was also controlled by the state.

In early January 2018, Chinese authorities in Shanxi province demolished a church, which created a wave of fear among the Christians. In reports of countries with the strongest anti-Christian persecution, China was ranked by the Open Doors organization in 2019 as the 27th most severe country and in 2020 as the 23rd most severe.

On 12 October 2025, Chinese authorities carried out a nationwide crackdown on the Zion Church, an underground Protestant church, arresting clergy and members. The move followed the introduction of an Online Code of Conduct for Religious Professionals in September, which restricts unauthorized religious content online. The crackdown is part of a broader effort to Sinicize religion and enforce state control over religious groups, including Protestant churches, Tibetan Buddhism, and Islam. Human Rights Watch condemned the arrests, describing them as part of intensified restrictions on religious freedom in China.

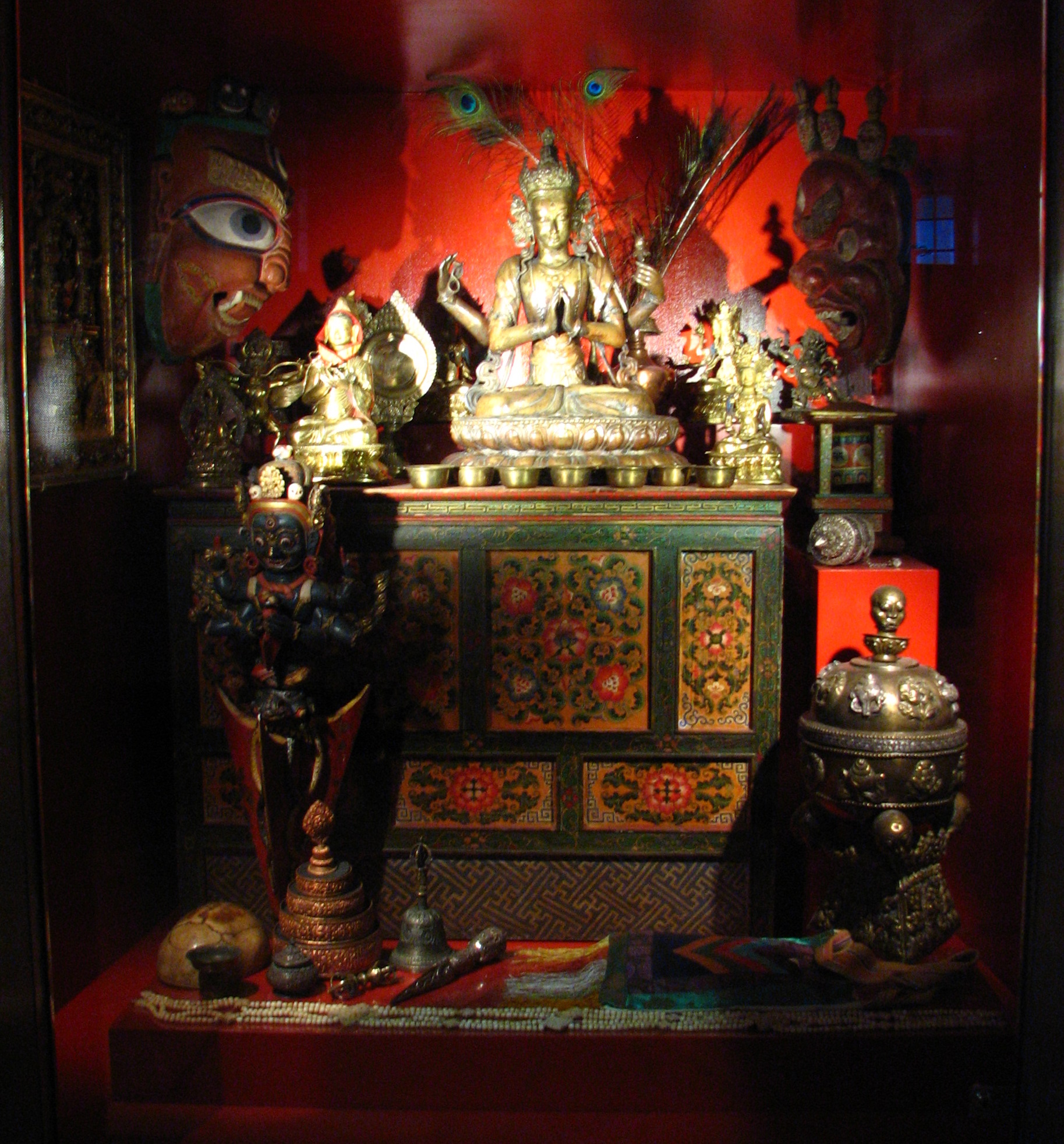
Tibet Buddhist Shrine

==== Tibetan Buddhism ====
The Dalai Lama is a highly influential figure in Tibetan Buddhism, who has traditionally lived in Tibet. Because of Chinese governmental control over the Tibetan area, the current Dalai Lama resides in Dharamshala, Himachal Pradesh, in the Republic of India. In a regulation promulgated on 3 August 2007, the Chinese government declared that after 1 September 2007, "[no] living Buddha [may be reincarnated] without government approval, since the Qing dynasty, when the live Buddha system was established." The PRC Government-appointed Panchen Lama is labelled a fake by those who regard the PRC's effort to control organized religion as contradictory to the Universal Declaration of Human Rights and other ethical principles.

Examples of the political controls exercised over religion in 1998 include:

- quotas on the number of monks to reduce the spiritual population;
- forced denunciation of the Dalai Lama as a spiritual leader;
- the expulsion of unapproved monks from monasteries;
- forced recitation of patriotic scripts supporting China;
- restriction of religious study before age 18.

Monks celebrating the reception of the US Congressional Gold Medal by the Dalai Lama have been detained by the PRC. In November 2012 the United Nations Human Rights Commissioner urged the PRC to address the allegations of rights violations in Tibet; the violations had led to an alarming escalation of 'desperate' forms of protest in the region, including self-immolations. Amnesty International report reports that Xinjiang Uyghur Autonomous Region and in Tibetan-populated areas.

Tibetans who opposed the diversion of irrigation water by Chinese authorities to the China Gold International Resources mining operations were detained, tortured, and murdered. Allegations of what the PRC officially labelled 'judicial mutilation' against Tibetans by the Dalai Lama's government, and the serfdom controversy, have been cited by the PRC as reasons to interfere for what they claim was the welfare of Tibetans, although their claims of "judicial mutilation" are controversial and subject to scepticism and dispute by foreign countries and international organizations. Conflicting reports about Tibetan human rights have been produced since then. The PRC claims that Tibet has been enjoying a cultural revival since the 1950s, whereas the Dalai Lama says "whether intentionally or unintentionally, somewhere cultural genocide is taking place".

Following the reform and opening up, businesspeople from other parts of China have made many business trips to Tibet, although most do not stay in the region. The New York Times has cited this ethnic diversity in Tibet as a cause of "ethnic tensions". It has also disagreed significantly with the promotion by PRC authorities of home ownership in nomadic Tibetan societies.

Barry Sautman, an American political scientist and visiting professor at the Hong Kong University of Science and Technology, argues in a 2003 paper that for a vast majority of Tibetans, who live in rural areas, the Chinese language is only introduced as a second language in secondary school. Free Tibet reported in 2008 that Tibetan languages were at risk of extinction in Tibet. The Tibet Action Institute, in their May 2025 report, "When They Came to Take Our Children", alleged that four-year-old children were being sent to boarding schools run by the Chinese Government, where they were beaten for praying and wearing Buddhist religious symbols, and taught only in Mandarin.

On 18 May 2026, the United States urged China to release Gedhun Choekyi Nyima, recognized by the Dalai Lama as the 11th Panchen Lama, who was abducted with his family in 1995. China has since installed its own Panchen Lama under government supervision and tightly controls Tibetan religious affairs. Despite ongoing international calls, China has refused to provide any credible information on Gedhun Choekyi Nyima.

==== Uyghurs ====
Article 36 of the PRC Constitution provides constitutional protection for citizens' freedom of religion and the country's official ethnic policies also reiterate protection of the freedom of religion of ethnic minorities, but in practice the Uyghur population, predominantly living in the Xinjiang Uyghur Autonomous Region, are subject to strict controls on the practice of Islam.

Examples of these restrictions now include:

- Official religious practices must be held in government-approved mosques;
- Uyghurs under 18 years old are not allowed to enter mosques or pray in school;
- The study of religious texts is only permitted in designated state schools;
- Government informers regularly attend religious gatherings in mosques;
- Women are not allowed to wear headscarves and veils and men are not allowed to have beards;
- The use of traditionally Islamic names (e.g., Abdul), is banned.

Since the September 11 attacks in 2001, Chinese counter-terror legislation has made explicit links between religion and extremism, and has led to regulations that explicitly ban religious expression among Uyghurs in particular.

Since 2017, reports have surfaced that around a million Muslims (Uyghur Chinese citizens and some Central Asian nationals) were detained in re-education camps throughout Xinjiang without trial or access to a lawyer. In these camps they were allegedly 're-educated' to disavow their Islamic beliefs and habitats while praising the CCP. The camps have expanded rapidly, with almost no judicial process or legal paperwork. Chinese officials are quoted in state media as saying that these measures are to fight separatism and Islamic extremism. Critics of the policy have described it as the sinicization of Xinjiang and called it an ethnocide or cultural genocide, with many activists, NGOs, human rights experts, government officials, and the U.S. government calling it a genocide.

New bans and regulations were implemented on 1 April 2017. Abnormally long beards and wearing veils in public were both banned. Not watching state-run television or listening to radio broadcasts, refusing to abide by family planning policies, or refusing to allow one's children to attend state-run schools were all prohibited. Giving a child a name that would "exaggerate religious fervor", such as Muhammad, was made illegal. Along with this, many mosques were demolished or destroyed.

According to Radio Free Asia, the Chinese government jailed Uyghur Imam Abduheber Ahmet after he took his son to a religious school not sanctioned by the Chinese state. Ahmet had previously been lauded by China as a "five-star" imam but was sentenced in 2018 to over five years in prison for his action.

Also in 2018, over one million Chinese government workers began forcibly living in the homes of Uyghur families to monitor and assess resistance to assimilation, and to watch for frowned-upon religious or cultural practices. These government workers were trained to call themselves "relatives" and have been described in Chinese state media as being a key part of enhancing "ethnic unity".

In addition, records of the government indicate that thousands of Uyghur children have been separated from their parents. New evidence shows that over 9,500 children in Yarkand county had at least one parent detained, most of them are Uyghur children. According to the researcher Adrian Zenz, in 2019, the number of children living in boarding facilities increased by 76%, reaching a total of 880,500 children.

In March 2020, the Chinese government was found to be using the Uyghur minority for forced labor, inside sweat shops. According to a report published then by the Australian Strategic Policy Institute (ASPI), no fewer than around 80,000 Uyghurs were forcibly removed from the region of Xinjiang and used for forced labor in at least twenty-seven corporate factories. According to the Business and Human Rights resource center, corporations such as Abercrombie & Fitch, Adidas, Amazon, Apple, BMW, Fila, Gap, H&M, Inditex, Marks & Spencer, Nike, North Face, Puma, PVH, Samsung, and UNIQLO have sourced from these factories prior to the publication of the ASPI report.

On 10 October 2020, the UK shadow foreign secretary, Lisa Nandy urged Britain to block China's seat on the United Nations Human Rights Council over the country's treatment of Uyghur Muslims.

On 19 January 2021, outgoing Secretary of State Mike Pompeo formally declared that China is committing a genocide against the Uyghurs and crimes against humanity. In a written letter, Pompeo wrote, "I believe this genocide is ongoing, and that we are witnessing the systematic attempt to destroy Uyghurs by the Chinese party-state." Pompeo called for "all appropriate multilateral and relevant juridical bodies, to join the United States in our effort to promote accountability for those responsible for these atrocities." China strongly denies that human rights abuses are going on in Xinjiang. Pompeo has previously stated that China is trying to "erase its own citizens."

In 2021, independent sources reported that Uyghur women in Xinjiang re-education camps have been systematically raped, sexually abused, and tortured. Victims said there is a system of organized rape. The Chinese police also electrocute and torture them. There is planned dehumanization, sterilization, and torture. China has undertaken a deliberate campaign to weaken and eradicate any vestiges of Uyghur culture, employing measures such as curtailing religious liberties and enforcing assimilation. Detainees have recounted experiences of being coerced to abandon their beliefs and swear allegiance to the CCP using methods reminiscent of psychological manipulation.

On 16 August 2021, a young Chinese woman, named Wu Huan, told the Associated Press in her testimony that she was allegedly held for eight days at a Chinese-run secret detention facility in the United Arab Emirates, along with two other Uyghurs. Wu Huan said she was abducted from a hotel in Dubai and detained by Chinese officials at a villa converted into a jail. It was the first evidence that China was operating a "black site" beyond its borders.

On 31 August 2022, the UN Human Rights Office issued an assessment of human rights concerns in Xinjiang Uyghur Autonomous Region. The report published in the wake of the visit by UN High Commissioner of Human Rights, Michelle Bachelet, stated that "allegations of patterns of torture, or ill-treatment, including forced medical treatment and adverse conditions of detention, are credible, as are allegations of individual incidents of sexual and gender-based violence."

A leaked document known as "The China Cables" details the conditions in the aforementioned re-education camps. These documents describe guidelines on a variety of things: preventing escapes, monitoring the Uyghurs, disciplining the Uyghurs, and much more. They are taught Mandarin and about Chinese culture. However, some claim this is renouncing their culture to conform to the CCP. Many Chinese officials have already dismissed the claims of breaching human rights and the contents of these documents. They refer to these camps as voluntary education centers where the Uyghurs are reeducated. The goal of these camps, according to former Chinese ambassador Liu Xiaoming, is to prevent terrorism. A United Nations assessment of human rights regarding the Xinjiang Uyghurs stated it is "reasonable to conclude that a pattern of large-scale arbitrary detention occurred in [vocational education and training centre] facilities, at least during 2017 to 2019", negating previous Chinese government claims that the facilities were schools or training centres where participants were free to join and leave.

The Foreign, Commonwealth and Development Office (FCDO) gave statement on China's human rights violations in Xinjiang, following a visit to the region by the UN High Commissioner for Human Rights. An FCDO spokesperson said, "It is clear that the Chinese authorities did not provide the full, unfettered access to Xinjiang for the UN High Commissioner for Human Rights that we and our international partners have long called for. China's failure to grant such access only serves to highlight their determination to hide the truth."

==== Falun Gong ====
Following a period of meteoric growth of Falun Gong in the 1990s, the CCP, which was then led by its general secretary Jiang Zemin, banned Falun Gong on 20 July 1999. An extra-constitutional body called the 6-10 Office was created to lead the suppression of Falun Gong. The authorities mobilized the state media apparatus, judiciary, police, army, the education system, families, and workplaces against the group. The campaign is driven by large-scale propaganda through television, newspaper, radio, and internet. There are reports of systematic torture, illegal imprisonment, forced labour, organ harvesting, and abusive psychiatric measures, with the apparent aim of forcing practitioners to recant their belief in Falun Gong.

Foreign observers estimate that hundreds of thousands and perhaps millions of Falun Gong practitioners have been detained in "re-education through labor" camps, prisons, and other detention facilities for refusing to renounce the spiritual practice. Former prisoners have reported that Falun Gong practitioners consistently received "the longest sentences and worst treatment" in labour camps, and in some facilities Falun Gong practitioners formed the substantial majority of detainees. As of 2009 at least 2,000 Falun Gong adherents had been tortured to death in the persecution campaign, with some observers putting the number much higher.

Some international observers and judicial authorities have described the campaign against Falun Gong as a genocide. In 2009, courts in Spain and Argentina indicted senior Chinese officials for genocide and crimes against humanity for their role in orchestrating the suppression of Falun Gong.

===== Organ harvesting =====
According to allegations which were made in 2006, the vital organs of non-consenting Falun Gong practitioners had been used to supply China's organ tourism industry. In 2008, two United Nations Special Rapporteurs reiterated their requests for "the Chinese government to fully explain the allegation of taking vital organs from Falun Gong practitioners and the source of organs for the sudden increase in organ transplants that has been going on in China since the year 2000".

Matas, Kilgour, and Gutmann have published three books in which they have alleged that organ harvesting is occurring in China. The Kilgour-Matas report stated, "the source of 41,500 transplants for the six-year period 2000 to 2005 is unexplained" and "we believe that there has been and continues today to be large-scale organ seizures from unwilling Falun Gong practitioners". Ethan Gutmann, who interviewed over 100 individuals as witnesses, estimated that 65,000 Falun Gong prisoners were killed for their organs from 2000 to 2008.

=== Political freedom ===
The People's Republic of China is a signatory to the International Covenant on Civil and Political Rights, but has not ratified it. Legally, all citizens of the People's Republic of China who have reached the age of 18 have the right to vote and stand for election, regardless of ethnicity, race, sex, occupation, family background, religious belief, education, property status, or length of residence, except for persons deprived of political rights according to laws imposed by the CCPs Constitution.

In Mao's China, the CCP openly repressed all opposing political groups. This behaviour is now reflected in the judicial system, and has evolved into the selective repression of small groups of people who overtly challenge the CCP's power or its people's democratic dictatorship. The most recent major movement advocating for political freedom was obliterated through the Tiananmen Square massacre in 1989, the estimated death toll of which ranges from about 200 to 10,000 depending on sources. In November 1992, 192 Chinese political activists and democracy advocates submitted a petition to the 16th National Congress of the Chinese Communist Party to introduce political reforms. One of the six demands was the ratification of the Covenant. As a reaction to the petition, the Chinese authorities arrested Zhao Changqing, proponent of the petition, and are still holding a number of activists for attempted subversion.

One of the most famous dissidents is Zhang Zhixin, who is known for standing up against the ultra-left.

In October 2008, the government denounced the European Parliament's decision to award the Sakharov Prize for Freedom of Thought to political prisoner Hu Jia, maintaining that it was "gross interference in China's domestic affairs' to give such an award to a "jailed criminal... in disregard of [the Chinese government's] repeated representations."

Although the Chinese government does not violate its people's privacy as much or as overtly as it used to, it still deems it necessary to keep track of what people say in public. Internet forums are strictly monitored, as are international postal mail (which sometimes is inexplicably delayed, or simply disappears) and e-mail.

Local officials are chosen by election, and even though non-CCP candidates are allowed to stand, those with dissident views can face arbitrary exclusion from the ballot, interference with campaigning, and even detention.

Freedom House rates China as a 6 (the second lowest possible rank) in political freedoms. In 2011, the organization said of the Chinese political leadership:

With a sensitive change of leadership approaching in 2012 and popular uprisings against authoritarian regimes occurring across the Middle East, the ruling Chinese Communist Party showed no signs of loosening its grip on power in 2011. Despite minor legal improvements regarding the death penalty and urban property confiscation, the government stalled or even reversed previous reforms related to the rule of law, while security forces resorted to extralegal forms of repression. Growing public frustration over corruption and injustice fueled tens of thousands of protests and several large outbursts of online criticism during the year. The party responded by committing more resources to internal security forces and intelligence agencies, engaging in the systematic enforced disappearance of dozens of human rights lawyers and bloggers, and enhancing controls over online social media.

According to the Amnesty International report from 2016/2017, the government continued to draft and enact a series of new national security laws that presented serious threats to the protection of human rights. The nationwide crackdown on human rights lawyers and activists continued throughout the year. Activists and human rights defenders continued to be systematically subjected to monitoring, harassment, intimidation, arrest, and detention. The report continues that police detained increasing numbers of human rights defenders outside of formal detention facilities, sometimes without access to a lawyer for long periods, exposing the detainees to the risk of torture and other ill-treatment. Booksellers, publishers, activists, and a journalist who went missing in neighboring countries in 2015 and 2016 turned up at detention in China, causing concerns about China's law enforcement agencies acting outside their jurisdiction.

In the 709 crackdown which began in 2015, more than 200 lawyers, legal assistants, and activists, including Jiang, were arrested and/or detained.

As of July 2025, a decade after the 709 crackdown, legal professionals and activists report that the CCP's control over the legal profession has further tightened, making human rights advocacy nearly impossible.

==== Independence movements ====

The independence movements in China are mainly contained within the Inner Mongolian Regions, the Tibetan region, and the Xinjiang region. These regions contain people from ethnic and religious minority groups such as the Mongols, the Tibetans, and the Uyghurs.

The Chinese government has had strained relations with these regions since the early 1910s, when the first president of the Chinese Republic, Sun Yat-sen, suggested a plan to move a large number of Han people from Southeast China to Northwest China in an effort to assimilate the ethnic minorities that lived in the area. While Sun Yat-sen lost political power before he could enforce this plan, his sinocentric, assimilationist attitude was adopted by future leader Chiang Kai-shek. Chiang Kai-shek enacted educational policy that encouraged cultural assimilation and discouraged self-determinism until 1945, when Chiang Kai-shek and his Nationalist party became more lenient toward the various ethnic minorities. From this time until the establishment of the People's Republic of China under Mao Zedong, ethnic minorities experienced great independence from the Chinese government, with Mongolia becoming an independent state in 1921 and Xinjiang being named an autonomous region in 1955.

Tibetan, Mongolian, and Xinjiang independence was severely restricted by the CCP in the 1950s under Mao Zedong, with the forced annexation of Inner Mongolia, Tibet, and Xinjiang back into mainland China, leading to many protests and riots from the ethnic and religious minorities in the autonomous regions. From this point onward, there has been a sustained outpouring of secessionist and independence movements from China's autonomous regions.

Currently, the largest independence struggle is being waged by the Muslim-Turkic population of Xinjiang, which shares minimal cultural, lingual, and historical similarities with the Han population in China. While the Chinese government under Deng Xiaoping promised to grant some advantages to the population of Xinjiang such as practising affirmative action in universities, greater liberties with regard to China's one-child policy, and increased government subsidies in the region, the government also discourages and restricts the Muslim-Turkic ethnic population from freely practising its religion, expressing its faith by wearing head scarves, fasting, growing facial hair, and building mosques freely. Furthermore, because of the advantages which the Chinese government grants to the people of Xinjiang, many Han Chinese are prejudiced against them, and their prejudice against the Uyghurs is bolstered by the widespread belief that the government unfairly grants preferential treatment to ethnic minorities in general.

One noteworthy event is the February 1997 riots in Yining, a county which is located between Kazakhstan and Xinjiang, during which 12 independence movement leaders were executed and 27 others were arrested and incarcerated. Moreover, almost 200 Uyghurs were killed and over 2,000 more Uyghurs were arrested. In 2008 riots broke out within Tibetan regions such as Lhasa, and anti-Han "pogroms" were committed in Ürümqi, Xinjiang in July 2009. In response to these riots, the Chinese government has increased its police presence in these regions and it has also sought to control offshore reporting and intimidate foreign-based reporters by detaining their family members.

==== Political abuse of psychiatry ====
Political abuse of psychiatry began to be practised in mainland China during the 1950s, shortly after Mao Zedong established the People's Republic of China, and continues to be practised in different forms up to present day. Initially, under Mao Zedong, the practice of psychiatry in China saw legitimate improvements in the breadth and quality of treatments. However, as time passed under the direction of Mao Zedong and the campaign of ideological reform was implemented, psychiatric diagnoses became used as a way to control and incarcerate Chinese citizens who didn't subscribe to Maoist ideologies such as Marxism–Leninism. The main demographic of Chinese citizens being targeted and placed in mental asylums were academics, intellectuals, students, and religious groups for their capitalist tendencies and bourgeois worldview. The justification for placing those who didn't comply with Maoist principles in mental institutions was the belief that non-Maoist political ideologies such as capitalism caused extreme individualism and selfishness, which contributed to mental disabilities such as schizophrenia and paranoid psychosis. Maoists justified their claim that anti-Communist beliefs caused mental imbalances by making a positive correlation between the wealth and class of a particular group of people and the number of "mentally ill" people within that group.

Political abuse of psychiatry in mainland China peaked from the mid-1960s to the late 1970s. During this time, Chinese counterrevolutionists and political dissidents were placed into mental asylums, where they were treated with psychotherapy (xinli zhiliao) resembling political indoctrination sessions. During this time, statistics indicate that there were more political activists being held in mental institutions than the number of rapists, murderers, arsonists, and other violent mentally ill people combined. The human rights activist Wei Jingsheng was among the first to speak out about the misappropriation of psychiatry for political purposes in the winter of 1978; however, in response to his advocacy, he was imprisoned and subjected to involuntary drugging and beating by the Chinese government.

After the end of the Cultural Revolution in the late 1970s, the abuse of psychiatry for political purposes continually diminished until the 1990s, when there was a resurgence in politically motivated psychiatric diagnoses toward political dissidents and minority religious groups. During this more recent wave of Chinese forensic psychiatry, political dissidents and practicers of non-mainstream religions were sent to Ankang (meaning peace and health) hospitals. These hospitals, built to hold the criminally insane, are managed by Bureau No. 13 of China's Ministry of Public Security. Ankang hospitals have been the target of much scrutiny by human rights activists and organizations both inside and outside of China, and reports indicate inhumane treatment of patients inside these hospitals. Patients in these hospitals are forced to work at least 7 hours a day and are subjected to torture including acupuncture with electric currents, forced injection of drugs that are known to damage the central nervous system, and physical abuse with ropes and electric batons. Furthermore, reports by Chinese surgeons at these hospitals report on the use of psychosurgery on patients who were involuntarily placed in these hospitals to reduce "violent and impulsive behaviors". One of the most targeted groups of Chinese citizens to be placed in Ankang hospitals are the practicers of Falun Gong, who have what is termed "evil cult-induced mental disorder" or "xiejiao suo zhi jingshen zheng'ai" by Chinese psychiatry. Over 1000 practitioners have been incarcerated in mental asylums across 23 provinces, cities, and autonomous regions.

One of the most famous cases of politically motivated psychiatric diagnoses took place in 1992, when Wang Wanxing was arrested for displaying a pro-democracy banner in Tiananmen Square. After Wang's arrest, his wife signed a statement confirming his mental instability, because police told her that doing so would ensure Wang's immediate release. However, Wang was instead placed in the Beijing Ankang hospital. He was exiled to Germany in 2005.

The People's Republic of China is the only country which currently abuses psychiatry for political purposes in a systematic way, and despite international criticism, this abuse seems to be continuing as of 2010. Political abuse of psychiatry in the People's Republic of China is high on the agenda in the international psychiatric community, and has produced recurring disputes. The abuses there appear to be even more widespread than in the Soviet Union in the 1970s and 1980s and involve the incarceration of petitioners, human rights workers, trade union activists, followers of the Falun Gong movement, and people complaining against injustices by local authorities.

In August 2002, the General Assembly of the WPA was held during the WPA World Congress in Yokohama. The issue of Chinese political abuse of psychiatry was placed on the agenda of the General Assembly, and a decision was made to send an investigative mission to China. The visit was projected for the spring of 2003, in order to assure that a representative of the WPA could present a report during the Annual Meeting of the American Psychiatric Association in May 2003, as well as at the annual meeting of the British Royal College of Psychiatrists in June and July of that year. The 2003 investigative mission never took place, and when the WPA did organize a visit to China, it was more a scientific exchange. In the meantime, the political abuse of psychiatry persists unabated.

==== Political prisoners ====
The Chinese government has a history of imprisoning citizens for political reasons. Article 73 of China's Criminal Procedure Law was adopted in 2012 and allow the authorities to detain people for reasons of state security or terrorism. In this regard, detainees can be held for as long as six months in "designated locations" such as secret prisons.

The number of political prisoners peaked during the Mao era and it has been decreasing ever since. From 1953 to 1975, around 26 to 39 per cent of prisoners were incarcerated for political reasons. By 1980, the percentage of prisoners incarcerated for political reasons was only 13 per cent, and this figure decreased to 0.5 per cent in 1989 and 0.46 per cent in 1997. 1997 is also the year that the Chinese Criminal Law was amended to replace counterrevolutionary crime with crimes endangering national security.

During the Mao era, one notorious labour camp called Xingkaihu which was located in the northeastern Heilongjiang Province was operated from 1955 to 1969. During this time, over 20,000 inmates were forced to work on irrigation, infrastructure construction, and agricultural projects for the government while being subjected to ideological reform; a significant percentage of these inmates were incarcerated for being counterrevolutionaries and political dissidents. The conditions in Xingkaihu were so poor that many inmates eventually died due to malnutrition and disease.

More recently, since the spring of 2008, the Chinese government has detained 831 Tibetans as political prisoners; of these 831 prisoners, 12 are serving life sentences and 9 were sentenced to death.

In 2009 Nobel Laureate Liu Xiaobo was imprisoned for advocating democratic reforms and increased freedom of speech in Charter 08. In 2017 he died in prison from late stage liver cancer at the age of 61.

Other political prisoners include journalist Tan Zuoren, human rights activist Xu Zhiyong, and journalist Shi Tao. Tan Zuoren was arrested in 2010 and sentenced to 5 years in prison after publicly speaking about government corruption as well as the poorly constructed school buildings that collapsed and led to the deaths of thousands of children during the 2008 earthquake in Sichuan. Xu Zhiyong was sentenced to four years in prison in 2014 after gaining a significant social media following and using it as a platform to express his sociopolitical opinions. Shi Tao was sentenced to 8 years after publicizing the list of instructions that the CCP sent journalists regarding how to report the 15th anniversary of the Tiananmen Square massacre.

==== Pro-democracy movements ====
Some people have campaigned against the one-party Communist rule in mainland China over the years.

=== Freedom of assembly and association ===
The freedom of assembly is provided by the Article 35 of the Chinese Constitution. The Article 51, however, restricts its exercise: such right «may not infringe upon the interests of the state».

Human rights activists such as Xie Xang fight for the rights of Chinese people by protesting, slandering the governments' names on social media, and by filing lawsuits. Xang has commented on the punishment he received for protesting, claiming that he was interrogated while shackled onto a metal chair, forced to sit in stressful positions for a set amount of time, and tortured physically and mentally. He also quoted his interrogators stating that he was told that "I could torture you to death and no one could help you."

=== Freedom of movement and privacy ===
In 2010, in response to Chunyun (increase in traffic movements due to Chinese New Year), which has caused various problems with tickets prices (due to resale by speculative traders), a system similar to blogs-related real-name identification system was introduced on nine railroad stations. It requires the transport companies to demand far-travellers to provide their name for their tickets. Several critics and media have raised concerns about its possible privacy violations and freedom of movement rights restrictions risks.

In July 2026, Taiwan's Mainland Affairs Council raised concerns over China's new entry and exit rules, which give authorities greater powers to restrict the movement of Chinese citizens and foreign visitors for reasons including national security and public interest.

== One-child policy (1979-2015) ==
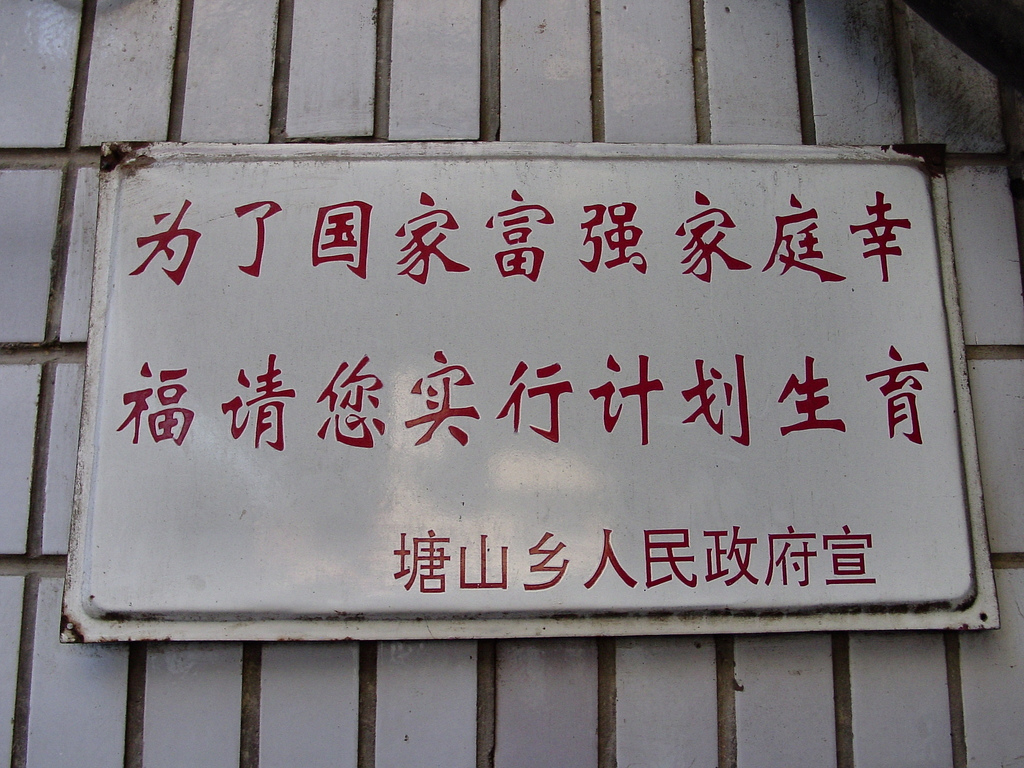
Government sign stating: 'For a prosperous, powerful nation and a happy family, please use birth planning.'

The Chinese government's birth control policy, known widely as the one-child policy, was implemented in 1979 by chairman Deng Xiaoping's government to alleviate the overpopulation problem. Having more than one child was illegal and punishable by fines. This policy was replaced with a two-child policy in 2015. In May 2021, the policy was further relaxed to a three child policy, and all restrictions were removed in July 2021.

In 2005, Voice of America cited critics who argued that the one-child policy contributed to forced abortions, human rights violations, female infanticide, abandonment, and sex-selective abortions, which are believed to be relatively commonplace in some areas of the country. Sex-selective abortions are thought to have been a significant contribution to the gender imbalance in mainland China, where there is a 118:100 ratio of male to female children reported. Forced abortions and sterilizations have also been reported.

Chinese state-run media reported on 3 June 2013 that the city of Wuhan was considering legislation to fine women who have children out of wedlock, or with men who were already married. The fine was considered a 'social compensation fee', and has been sharply criticized for potentially exacerbating the problem of abandoned children.

== Capital punishment ==
According to Amnesty International, throughout the 1990s more people were executed or sentenced to death in China than in the rest of the world put together.

Officially, the death penalty in mainland China is only administered to offenders who commit serious and violent crimes, such as aggravated murder, but China retains in law a number of nonviolent death penalty offences such as drug trafficking. The People's Republic of China administers more official death penalties than any other country, though other countries (such as Iran and Singapore) have higher official execution rates. Reliable NGOs such as Amnesty International and Human Rights in China have informed the public that the total execution numbers, with unofficial death penalties included, greatly exceed officially recorded executions; in 2009, the Dui Hua Foundation estimated that 5,000 people were executed in China – far more than all other nations combined.

Chinese authorities have recently been pursuing measures to reduce the official number of crimes punishable by death and limit how much they officially utilize the death penalty. In 2011, the National People's Congress Standing Committee adopted an amendment to reduce the number of capital crimes from 68 to 55.

The death penalty is one of the classical Five Punishments of the Chinese Dynasties. In Chinese philosophy, the death penalty was supported by the Legalists, but its application was tempered by the Confucianists, who preferred rehabilitation over punishment of any sort, including capital punishment. In Communist philosophy, Vladimir Lenin urged the retention of the death penalty, while Karl Marx and Friedrich Engels claimed that the practice was feudal and a symbol of capitalist oppression. Chairman Mao of the CCP and his government retained the death penalty's place in the legal system, while advocating that it be used for a limited number of counterrevolutionaries. The market reformer Deng Xiaoping after him stressed that the practice must not be abolished, and advocated its wider use against recidivists and corrupt officials. Leaders of the China's minor, non-communist parties termed "democratic parties" have also advocated for greater use of the death penalty. Both Deng and Mao viewed the death penalty as having tremendous popular support, and portrayed the practice as a means to 'assuage the people's anger'.

The death penalty has widespread support in mainland China, especially for violent crimes, and no group in government or civil society vocally advocates for its abolition. Surveys conducted by the Chinese Academy of Social Sciences in 1995, for instance, found that 95 per cent of the Chinese population supported the death penalty, and these results were mirrored in other studies. Polling conducted in 2007 in Beijing, Hunan, and Guangdong found a more moderate 58 per cent in favour of the death penalty, and further found that a majority (63.8 per cent) believed that the government should release execution statistics to the public.

A total of 46 crimes are punishable by death, including some non-violent, white-collar crimes such as embezzlement and tax fraud. Execution methods include lethal injections and shooting. The People's Armed Police carries out the executions, usually at 10:00 am.

Death sentences in post-Maoist mainland China can be politically or socially influenced. In 2003, a local court sentenced the leader of a triad society to a death sentence with two years of probation. However, the public opinion was that the sentence was too light. Under public pressure, the supreme court of Communist China took the case and retried the leader, resulting in a death sentence, which was carried out immediately.

On 4 April 2026, China executed Chan Thao Phoumy in Guangzhou following his 2010 conviction for alleged involvement in a methamphetamine trafficking network. The execution drew condemnation from France, which criticized the denial of legal representation at his final hearing and reiterated its opposition to the death penalty.

=== Execution protocol ===
The execution protocol is defined in criminal procedure law, under article 212:

Before a people's court executes a death sentence, it shall notify the people's procuratorate at the same level to send personnel to supervise the execution.
Death sentences shall be executed by means of shooting or injection.
Death sentences may be executed at the execution ground or in designated places of custody.
The judicial personnel directing the execution shall verify the identity of the criminal offender, ask him if he has any last words or letters, and then deliver him to the executioner for the death sentence. If, before the execution, it is found that there may be an error, the execution shall be suspended and the matter shall be reported to the Supreme People's Court for decision.
Execution of death sentences shall be announced to the public, but shall not be held in public.
The attending court clerk shall, after an execution, make a written record thereon. The people's court that caused the death sentence to be executed shall submit a report on the execution to the Supreme People's Court.
The people's court that caused the death sentence to be executed shall, after the execution, notify the family of the criminal offender.

Since 1949, the most common method of execution has been execution by shooting. This method has been largely superseded by lethal injection, using the same three-drug cocktail pioneered by the United States, introduced in 1996. Execution vans are unique to mainland China, however. Lethal injection is more commonly used for 'economic crimes' such as corruption, while shooting are used for more common crimes like murder. In 2010, Chinese authorities moved to have lethal injection become the dominant form of execution; in some provinces and municipalities, it is now the only legal form of capital punishment. The Dui Hua foundation notes that it is impossible to ascertain whether these guidelines are closely followed, as the method of execution is rarely specified in published reports.

=== Criticism ===
Human rights groups and foreign governments have heavily criticized the PRC's use of the death penalty for a variety of reasons, including its application for non-violent offences, allegations of the use of torture to extract confessions, legal proceedings that do not meet international standards, and the government's failure to publish statistics on the death penalty. However, as acknowledged by both the Chinese Supreme Court and the United States Department of State, the vast majority of death sentences are given for violent, nonpolitical crimes which would be considered serious in other countries.

The Coalition to Investigate the Persecution of Falun Gong has accused Chinese hospitals of using the organs of executed prisoners for commercial transplantation. Under Chinese law, condemned prisoners must give written consent to become organ donors, but because of this and other legal restrictions on organ donation, an international black market in organs and cadavers from China has developed. In 2009, Chinese authorities acknowledged that two-thirds of organ transplants in the country could be traced back to executed prisoners and announced a crackdown on the practice.

=== Wrongful executions ===
An estimate of over 1000 people are executed every year in mainland China. Most of these executions are due to crimes that are seen as intolerable to the society within mainland China and the People's Republic of China. There are some cases that have been held wrongly.

At least four people have been considered wrongfully executed by PRC courts.

- Wei Qing'an (魏清安, circa 1951 – 1984) was a Chinese citizen who was executed for the rape of Liu, a woman who had disappeared. The execution was carried out on 3 May 1984 by the Intermediate People's Court. In the next month, Tian Yuxiu (田玉修) was arrested and admitted that he had committed the rape. Three years later, Wei was officially declared innocent.
- Teng Xingshan (滕兴善, ? – 1989) was a Chinese citizen who was executed for having raped, robbed and murdered Shi Xiaorong (石小荣), a woman who had disappeared. An old man found a dismembered body, and police forensics claimed to have matched the body to the photo of the missing Shi Xiaorong. The execution was carried out on 28 January 1989 by the Huaihua Intermediate People's Court. In 1993, the missing woman returned to the village, saying she had been kidnapped to Shandong. The absolute innocence of the executed Teng was not admitted until 2006.
- Nie Shubin (聂树斌, 1974 – 1995) was a Chinese citizen who was executed for the rape and murder of Kang Juhua (康菊花), a woman in her thirties. The execution was carried out on 27 April 1995 by the Shijiazhuang Intermediate People's Court. In 2005, ten years after the execution, Wang Shujin (王书金) admitted to the police that he had committed the murder. Therefore, it has been indicated that Nie Shubin had been innocent all along.
- Huugjilt (呼格吉勒图, 1977 – 1996) was a Mongolian Chinese man who was executed on 10 June 1996 for the rape and murder of a woman. On 5 December 2006, ten years after the execution, serial killer Zhao Zhihong confessed to the murder. Huugjilt was posthumously exonerated, and Zhao Zhihong was sentenced to death in 2015 and executed in 2019.

== Torture ==
Although the People's Republic of China outlawed torture in 1996, human rights groups say brutality and degradation are common in Chinese arbitrary detention centers, Laojiao prisons, and black jails. People who are imprisoned for their political views, human rights activities, or religious beliefs have a high risk of being tortured. Strategies of torture inside black jails that have been criticized as being inhumane include deprivation of sleep, food, and medication. For those in detention, the "wheel battle" (Chinese: 车轮战; pinyin: Chēlúnzhàn) tactic involves "unrelenting continuous interrogation by multiple rotating interrogators". While the existence of black jails is acknowledged by at least part of the government, the CCP strongly denies facilitating the operation of such jails and officially cracks down on them, leading to at least one trial.

In May 2010, the Chinese authorities officially passed new regulations in an attempt to nullify evidence gathered through violence or intimidation in their official judicial procedures, and to reduce the level of torture administered to prisoners already in jails. Little is known, however, about whether or how procedures were modified in black jails, which are not officially part of the judicial system. The move came after a public outcry following the revelation that a farmer, convicted for murder based on his confession under torture, was in fact innocent. The case came to light only when his alleged victim was found alive, after the defendant had spent ten years in prison. International human rights groups gave the change a cautious welcome.

Torture is reportedly used as part of the indoctrination process at the Xinjiang re-education camps. The torture is alleged to include waterboarding and sexual violence.

== Ethnic minorities ==
There are 55 officially recognized native ethnic minorities in China. Article 4 of the Chinese constitution states 'All nationalities in the People's Republic of China are equal', and the government argues that it has made efforts to improve ethnic education and increased ethnic representation in local government. Some groups are still fighting for recognition as minorities. In the 1964 Census, there were 183 nationalities registered, of which the government recognized 54.

Some policies cause reverse racism, in which Han Chinese and even ethnic minorities from other regions of China are treated as second-class citizens in the region which is inhabited by a Han Chinese majority. Similarly, there are wide-ranging preferential policies (affirmative action programs) in place to promote social and economic development for ethnic minorities, including preferential employment, political appointments, and business loans. Universities typically have quotas reserved for ethnic minorities, even if they have lower admission test scores. Ethnic minorities are also more often exempt from the one-child policy, which targets the Han Chinese.

Stern punishments of independence-seeking demonstrators, rioters, or terrorists have led to mistreatment of the Tibetan and Uyghur minorities in Western China. The United States in 2007 refused to help repatriate five Chinese Uyghur Guantanamo Bay detainees because of 'past treatment of the Uigur minority'. In its 2007 annual report to the U.S. Congress, the Congressional-Executive Commission on China said the Chinese government "provides incentives for migration to the region from elsewhere in China." Xi Jinping, the general secretary of the Chinese Communist Party, said in April 2014 that China faces increasing threats to national security and the government could impose tougher controls on its ethnic minorities due to terrorist attacks like the 2014 Kunming attack. In Xinjiang, the Ürümqi Motorized Vehicle Licensing and Testing Department has begun requiring all ethnic Uyghur and Kazakh individuals to undergo a background check before registering a vehicle.

Since July 2016, the Chinese government in Xinjiang has implemented widespread measures against Uyghurs, including mass arbitrary detention, forced labor, destruction of religious sites, strict surveillance, and restrictions on cultural and religious practices. These actions have extended beyond China's borders, with authorities reportedly intimidating Uyghur exiles and their families abroad, leading to accusations of transnational repression and widespread human rights violations.

=== Law on Promoting Ethnic Unity and Progress ===
The Law on Promoting Ethnic Unity and Progress is the People's Republic of China's (PRC) guiding legislation concerning ethnic minorities. The law was introduced by the National People's Congress (NPC)'s Ethnic Affairs Committee and submitted to the NPC on 8 September 2025. It was signed into law on 12 March 2026 and enacted on 1 July 2026. The law codifies CCP general secretary Xi Jinping's policies regarding the sinicization of ethnic minorities. The law has been widely criticized by scholars, the United Nations High Commissioner for Human Rights, multiple governments, former United Nations special rapporteurs, and human rights activists outside of China. The law's promotion of extraterritorial enforcement has been likened to transnational repression.

=== Responses ===
In March 2007, Yeshe Sangpo, a Tibetan activist from Bumnying Village in Sershul County, Kardze Prefecture, led a protest advocating for the preservation and use of the Tibetan language amid tightening government restrictions. The demonstration escalated after clashes with Chinese police, resulting in the death of a policeman, for which Sangpo was held responsible. In March 2008, he was sentenced to 18 years in prison following a trial criticized for lacking due process. Sangpo was released on March 25, 2026, reportedly in fragile health.

In 2025, Tibetan monks Samten Gyatso and Jamyang Samten of Chu Khama Monastery in Machu County were detained by Chinese authorities and have remained incommunicado for over a year. Their arrests followed previous scrutiny for sharing images of the Dalai Lama and disseminating information online, with authorities reportedly seizing religious texts and digital devices. No formal charges have been disclosed, and their current status remains unknown, raising international concerns over restrictions on religious freedom and freedom of expression in Tibet.

In March 2026, Abdulhakim Idris, a Uyghur scholar and human rights advocate, was detained upon arrival in Kuala Lumpur, Malaysia, and subsequently deported to the United States after nearly 21 hours in airport detention. The incident occurred amid efforts to launch the Malay-language edition of his book documenting Chinese government influence in Muslim-majority countries and the persecution of Uyghurs. U.S. officials indicated that the deportation followed pressure from Chinese authorities.

In March 2026, Uyghur rights activists, including members of the World Uyghur Congress, were targeted with malware disguised as a Uyghur-language software tool. Researchers said the attack, linked to China, was part of a wider campaign to monitor and intimidate Uyghurs abroad.

In April 2026, UN human rights experts raised concerns that China's Law on Promoting Ethnic Unity and Progress, passed on 12 March, could restrict the cultural, linguistic, and religious rights of ethnic minorities, including Tibetans, Uyghurs, and Mongols. The law formalizes China's assimilationist policies and drew criticism from the European Parliament, which debated a resolution on its impact on ethnic identities in late April 2026.

In May 2026, the RightsCon conference in Zambia, country in South Africa was abruptly cancelled, reportedly under Chinese pressure, drawing attention to Beijing's repression of Uyghurs in East Turkistan, including arbitrary detention, forced labor, and cultural restrictions. Around the same time, US lawmakers and activists called for stronger international action against China's human rights abuses.

Commemorative protest were held in multiple cities after Tibetan activist Lobsang Palden, also known as Rangzen Lobga, died following a self-immolation near the United Nations Headquarters in New York City on 2 July. The protesters said China's policies in Tibet, including the Ethnic Unity and Progress promotion law, put Tibetan culture and identity at risk.

== Forcible biometrics collection ==
Chinese authorities in western Xinjiang province are collecting DNA samples, fingerprints, eye scans, and blood types of millions of people aged 12 to 65. Sophie Richardson, Human Rights Watch's China director, said "the mandatory databanking of a whole population's biodata, including DNA, is a gross violation of international human rights norms, and it's even more disturbing if it is done surreptitiously, under the guise of a free health care program." For the ethnic minority Uyghur people, it is mandatory to undergo the biometrics collection, disguised under physical examination. Coercion to give blood samples is a gross violation of human rights and individual privacy.

== Right to development ==
In Chinese policymakers' perspective, the right to development is the primary and most fundamental human right. According to this view, poverty is the greatest obstacle to human rights because without the production and supply of material goods it is difficult to realize any other human right. As a means to reduce poverty, development therefore provides the necessary conditions for other rights. In prioritizing the right to development and the right to survival, China portrays this human rights framework as people-focused and contends that the Western interpretation of human rights is too narrow.

In 1986, China voted in favor of the United Nations Declaration on the Right to Development, through which that right became internationally established.

China was among the drafters of the 1993 Vienna Declaration and Programme of Action, and its resolution—"the contribution of development to the enjoyment of all human rights"—was adopted by the UN Human Rights Council.

In 2016, China issued a white paper titled, The Right to Development: China's Philosophy, Practice, and Contribution. The white paper emphasizes the view that the rights to development and subsistence are the primary, basic human rights.

== Economic and property rights ==
The National People's Congress enacted a law in 2007 to protect private property, with the exception of land. Nevertheless, according to Der Spiegel magazine, local Chinese authorities have used brutal means to expropriate property, in a bid to profit from the construction boom.

== Slavery ==
Forced labor exists in the People's Republic of China under both legal and illegal guises. Unfree labor is not generally addressed by the Chinese authorities, local news organizations, or local NGOs as it is considered a sensitive subject.

== Rights related to sexuality ==
In 2001, homosexuality was removed from the official list of mental illnesses in China. However, China recognizes neither same-sex marriage nor civil unions.

According to the criminal law of the PRC, a man who has been raped cannot make accusations against either men or women of rape. However, the criminal law of the PRC's constitution in mainland China had been amended in August 2015. Thus, males can be victims of indecency, but the articles on the criminal law which are related to rape still remain unrevised, so male victims can only make accusations of indecency.

== Intersex rights ==
Intersex people in China suffer discrimination, lack of access to health care and coercive genital surgeries.

== COVID-19 pandemic ==
During the COVID-19 pandemic in China, the Chinese government censored online criticism of its response, including criticism of its lockdown measures. A number of whistleblowers were reportedly detained and subject to disappearances.
Some of these whistleblowers were:

- Li Wenliang, a Chinese medical doctor who worked at Wuhan Central Hospital and issued emergency warnings to other hospitals and doctors about the new disease. He was arrested and accused of "making false comments" that had "severely disturbed the social order".
- Fang Bin, a Chinese businessman, citizen journalist and whistleblower who broadcast images of Wuhan. He has been missing since 9 February 2020.
- Chen Qiushi, a Chinese lawyer, activist, and citizen journalist who covered the 2019–20 Hong Kong protests and the COVID-19 pandemic and was missing since 6 February 2020 until September 2020 when he was found but "not free." After 600 days, he re-appeared online, posting a letter on his Twitter account. "Over the past year and eight months, I have experienced a lot of things. Some of it can be talked about, some of it can't," Chen's letter read. "I believe you understand."
- Li Zehua, a Chinese citizen journalist, rapper, and YouTuber who was trying to trace missing lawyer and citizen journalist Chen Qiushi. He was missing since 26 February 2020 until late April 2020 when he posted a YouTube video that he had been forcibly quarantined for almost two months.
- Chen Mei and Cai Wei, activists who were sharing censored articles about the coronavirus outbreak on an online archive, have been noncontactable since 19 April 2020.
- Independent journalist Zhang Zhan was served a four-year prison sentence for "picking quarrels and provoking troubles", a charge she received after she flew to Wuhan following the COVID-19 outbreak.

== Other human rights issues ==
Workers' rights and privacy are contentious human rights issues in China. There have been several reports of core International Labour Organization conventions being denied to workers. One such report was released by the International Labor Rights Fund in October 2006; it documented minimum wage violations, long work hours, and inappropriate actions toward workers by management. Workers cannot form their own unions in the workplace; they may only join state-sanctioned ones. The extent to which these organizations can fight for the rights of Chinese workers is disputed.

The policy toward refugees from North Korea is a recurring human rights issue. It is official policy to repatriate these refugees to North Korea, but the policy is not evenly enforced and a considerable number of them stay in the People's Republic. Though it is in contravention of international law to deport political refugees, as illegal immigrants their situation is precarious. Their rights are not always protected, and some are tricked into marriage, forced to engage in cybersex or prostitution, allegedly linked to criminal networks generating an estimated annual revenue of $105,000,000 US.

African students in China have complained about their treatment in China. Their complaints largely ignored until 1988–1989, when "students rose up in protest against what they called 'Chinese apartheid'". African officials took notice of the issue, and the Organization of African Unity issued an official protest. The organization's chairman, President Moussa Traoré of Mali, went on a fact-finding mission to China. A 1989 report in The Guardian stated: 'these practices could threaten Peking's entire relationship with the continent.'

The United Nations reports that it has had difficulty in arranging official visits to China by UN Special Rapporteurs on various human rights issues.

On 9 September 2020, a global coalition of 321 civil society groups, including Amnesty International, urged United Nations to urgently create an independent international mechanism to address the Chinese government's human rights violations. In an open letter, the organizations highlighted China's rights violations worldwide, including the targeting of human rights defenders, global censorship and surveillance, and rights-free development that caused environmental degradation.

A report published by Human Rights Watch in August 2021 documents the economic, social, and cultural rights violations resulting from the China-financed hydroelectric dam construction in northeastern Cambodia. Nearly 5,000 people have been displaced due to the dam's construction.

In August 2024, US-based artist Gao Zhen was detained in China during a family visit and tried in a closed-door session for "defaming national heroes and martyrs" over satirical sculptures of Mao Zedong. The case, including restricted courtroom access and exit bans on his family, illustrates China's enforcement of laws affecting artistic expression and the treatment of individuals raising sensitive issues.

On 12 October 2025, China strongly rejected criticisms of its human rights record in Tibet and other regions during the United Nations General Assembly. At the 80th session's Third Committee debate, China's Deputy Permanent Representative Sun Lei condemned statements by representatives from the UK, Australia, Canada, the Czech Republic, Ireland, the Netherlands, Japan, and the EU, accusing them of smearing China under the pretext of issues related to Xinjiang, Hong Kong, and Tibet (referred to by China as Xizang). Sun expressed China's firm opposition to what it described as the politicization and weaponization of human rights, asserting that such criticisms constitute interference in its internal affairs.

On 29 October 2025, U.S. lawmakers introduced the Combatting the Persecution of Religious Groups in China Act, targeting Chinese officials involved in the repression of religious minorities, including Christians, Muslims, Buddhists, and Falun Gong practitioners. The bill calls for sanctions, supports China's designation as a "country of particular concern," and urges the release of detained religious and political prisoners.

On December 4, 2025, Tibetan religious leader and educator Choktrul Dorje Ten Rinpoche was reportedly detained in Chikdril County, Qinghai province, China, and has since been missing. By January 2026, informal indications suggested he was "under investigation." Amnesty International issued an urgent appeal over his incommunicado detention, lack of legal access, and restricted contact with family, highlighting broader concerns about the treatment of religious and cultural figures in Tibet under Chinese governance.

At the 61st session of the United Nations Human Rights Council, the International Campaign for Tibet (ICT) raised concerns over China's policies in Tibet, highlighting forced assimilation, restrictions on language and culture, and allegations of mistreatment and deaths in custody under the Law on Promoting Ethnic Unity and Progress.

On 31 May 2023, The New York Times reported that China was increasingly exporting its surveillance and policing model to authoritarian governments and fragile democracies in Africa, Southeast Asia, and Central Asia. The model combines extensive surveillance, biometric data collection, and police training, and has been criticized for enabling political control and suppressing dissent.

Concerns have also been raised over the treatment of students in "special training schools", some of which are also referred to as "internet addiction camps". Operating without government oversight, these privately run facilities employ deceptive recruitment tactics while purporting to address internet addiction and behavioral problems among adolescents. However, they have been widely criticized for alleged human rights abuses, including solitary confinement, torture, corporal punishment, physical and psychological coercion, forced labor, electroconvulsive therapy, and other forms of abuse that have even resulted in deaths. Reports have documented numerous cases in which students were deceived and sent to such facilities against their will, subjected to physical abuse, and deprived of basic rights such as safety and freedom, raising serious concerns over violations of their fundamental human rights and personal liberty.

== Position of the government ==
The Chinese Communist Party and the government of the People's Republic of China have frequently challenged notion that human rights, such as individual civil and political rights in international human rights law, are universal values. They have argued that human rights requires that the welfare of the collective outweigh rights of any individual. Chinese state media has stated that human rights should encompass what its officials have labelled as "economic standards of living and measures of health and economic prosperity". The Chinese government says that the "right to subsistence" and the "right to development" are the "foremost human rights".

The People's Republic of China emphasizes state sovereignty, which at times conflicts with the international norms or standards of human rights. However, its concept of human rights has developed radically over the years. From 1949 to the late 1970s, the CCP focused on promoting the rights of the masses: collective rights rather than individual human rights. Deng Xiaoping said that the right of a nation, or sovereignty (guoquan) is more important than human rights (renquan), and right of subsistence (shengcun quan) is more fundamental than political freedom. From the beginning of economic reforms in 1978 to the 1989 Tiananmen Square protests and massacre, the CCP raised concerns for human rights in their domestic and international policies. In 1991, China officially accepted the idea that human rights were compatible with Chinese socialism, publishing its first White Paper on Human Rights in that year.

In 1993 the state created the China Society for Human Rights Studies, which has represented Chinese positions on human rights in international forums, conferences, and media. China went on to sign two treaties – the International Covenant on Economic, Social and Cultural Rights (ICESCR) and the International Covenant on Civil and Political Rights (ICCPR) in 1997 and 1998, respectively. The ICESCR was ratified by the National People's Congress in 2001, but as of 2016, the ICCPR has not yet been ratified. As of 2013, the PRC had signed more than 20 international treaties on human rights.

=== Human rights in the West ===
Those who agree with the CCP point toward what they call rapid deterioration in Western societies, claiming that there has been an increase in geographic, religious, and racial segregation, rising crime rates, family breakdown, industrial action, vandalism, and political extremism within Western societies. The European Union and the United Nations claim to be stopping these types of human rights violations, save for a few violations committed by some Western governments (e.g. the CIA's extraordinary rendition programme). The PRC holds the opinion, though, that many alleged negatives about democratic society are a direct result of an excess of individual freedom, saying that too much freedom is dangerous. The PRC holds that these actions in Western nations are all violations of human rights. They say that these should be taken into account when assessing a country's human rights record. On occasion they have criticized the United States policies, especially the human rights reports published by its State Department. They cite the opinion that the United States, as well as the United Kingdom, has also violated human rights laws, for example during the invasion of Iraq.

In United Nations bodies, China argues for a way of looking at the concept of universal human rights that differs from the Western view. China's view is that a focus on political rights and values is a too narrow view of human rights, and should instead focus on economic outcomes, material well-being of people, and national sovereignty. China has promoted efforts to "break Western human rights hegemony".

=== Survey data ===
The World Values Survey's seventh wave (2017–2022) finds that 72% of Chinese are satisfied with the state of human rights in China, up from 67% in the sixth wave. In his multi-year study of World Values Survey data, academic Wenfang Tang concludes that unlike the liberal definition of human rights, which emphasizes individual political rights, Chinese people's views of human rights prioritize the right to survival over political rights. Majorities of those surveyed in China support government video surveillance of people in public areas, government monitoring of all emails and internet communications, and government collection about people in China without their knowledge.

=== Measures taken ===
In March 2003, an amendment was officially made to the Constitution of the People's Republic of China, officially stating that 'The State respects and preserves human rights.' In addition, China was dropped from a list of top ten human rights violators in the annual human rights report released by the U.S. State Department in 2008, though the report indicated that there were still widespread human rights-related issues in the PRC.

In 1988, the People's Republic of China began direct village elections to help maintain social and political order while facing rapid economic change. Elections now occur in about 650,000 villages across China, reaching 75% of the nation's 1.3 billion people, according to the Carter Center. In 2008, Shenzhen, which enjoys the highest per capita GDP in mainland China, was selected for experimentation, and over 70% of the government officials on the district level are to be directly elected (as of 2008). However, in keeping with CCP ideology, candidates must be selected from a pre-approved list.

== See also ==
- Beijing Municipal Prison
- Boycotts of Chinese products may use some of the arguments in this article as their basis
- Censorship in China
- Chinese censorship abroad
- Chinese nationalism
- Concerning the Situation in the Ideological Sphere
- Concerns and controversies at the 2022 Winter Olympics
- Democracy movements of China
- Dongzhou protests
- Drapchi Prison
- Empowerment and Rights Institute
- Enforced disappearance
- Han chauvinism
- Han nationalism
- Hong Kong Alliance in Support of Patriotic Democratic Movements of China
- Human Rights in China (organization)
- Human rights in Hong Kong
- Human rights in Macau
- Human rights in Taiwan
- Human rights in Tibet
- Incorporation of Xinjiang into the People's Republic of China
- International reactions to 2008 Tibetan protests
- Labour camps in Tibet
- Laogai, "reform through [forced] labor"
- List of concentration and internment camps#People's Republic of China
- List of prisons in the Tibet Autonomous Region
- Lop Nur Nuclear Weapons Test Base
- Open Constitution Initiative
- Penal system in China
- Protest and dissent in China
- Protests and uprisings in Tibet since 1950
- Qincheng Prison
- Racism in China
- Re-education through labour
- Secession in China
- Sinicization of Tibet
- Sinocentrism
- Tangshan protest
- Xinfang
- Yan Xiaoling - Fan Yanqiong Case
- 1987–1989 Tibetan unrest
- 2008 Lhasa violence
- 2010 Tibetan language protest
- 2011 Chinese pro-democracy protests
