= China human rights organizations =

This is an incomplete list of organisations which campaign on human rights in China.

== Organisations with central focus on human rights in China ==
- Human Rights in China
- Chinese Human Rights Defenders
- China Human Rights Lawyers Concern Group

== International organisations including focus on human rights in China ==
- Amnesty International
- Human Rights Watch

== Others ==
- Radio Free Asia

== See also ==
- Human Rights in China
