= Tangshan protest =

2004 protest in Hebei Province, China

The Tangshan protest occurred in 2004 after more than 11,000 farmers in Hebei Province, China, signed a petition calling for the removal of Communist Party officials who were allegedly involved in corruption. The protest led to a crackdown on rights activists and further repression of the farmers.

== Petition ==
Between 1992 and 1997, 23,000 Chinese farmers were resettled in Tangshan City, Hebei, to make way for the Taolinkou reservoir, some 100 km (62 mi) to the east of Beijing. By 2004, more than eight years after they had been moved, the displaced farmers had not been properly compensated. The farmers asserted that up to 60 million yuan of compensation funds had been misappropriated by officials from the local government. They said they were owed 13,000 yuan (U.S. $1,570) per household in compensation but some had received only half the amount, while others had received nothing.

Under the leadership of Zhang Youren, a peasant activist, the farmers organised a petition. In February 2004, a group of ten farmer representatives traveled to the capital to submit their petition to the National People's Congress. In his opening speech to the Congress, Prime Minister Wen Jiabao promised a crackdown on corruption and illegal land seizures. Nevertheless, the farmers from Tangshan were rounded up by the Beijing police who accused them of being Falun Gong members and subversives. Zhang Youren was put under pressure to denounce the 'criminals' who had supported the petition. Zhao Yan quickly lost his job with the China Reform magazine and by the end of the year he had been imprisoned; he was still in jail two years later when the authorities finally convicted him of fraud. Li Boguang was arrested in December 2004 but released after a few weeks on condition that he had no further involvement in farmer protests. Yu Meisun, who had already served an earlier jail sentence, was able to publish an online diary that gave details of police harassment.

== See also ==
- Li Boguang, lawyer
- Zhao Yan, journalist
- Dongzhou protests
- Empowerment and Rights Institute
- Human rights in the People's Republic of China
