= Criminal Defense in China =

2016 book by Terence C. Halliday and Sida Liu

- Author: Sida Liu and Terence C. Halliday
- Language: English
- Subject: Area Studies, Asian Studies, Sociology of law
- Genre: Non-fiction
- Published: 2016 (Cambridge University Press)
- Publication place: United States
- Pages: 205
- ISBN: 9781316677230

Criminal Defense in China: The Politics of Lawyers at Work is a book by Terence C. Halliday and Sida Liu on challenges facing criminal defense lawyers in China under Chinese Communist Party (CCP) rule, where criminal defense invokes laws and procedures that challenge the authority of the CCP.

== Background ==
Terence C. Halliday is a research professor at the American Bar Foundation. He has won distinguished book prizes from the American Sociological Association for his research concerning the politics of legal professions.

Sida Liu, co-author, is Professor of Law and Sociology at the University of Hong Kong. He is also Professor of Sociology, Law, and Global Affairs at the University of Toronto, Canada. He has previously co-authored with Halliday on Chinese criminal defense lawyers.

The book is a National Science Foundation-funded research.

Through 329 interviews in China and other research methods, the authors investigated and analyzed the intermingling of politics and practicing criminal defense in China between 2005 and 2015. Cambridge University Press published the book in November 2016 as part of the Cambridge Studies in Law and Society series.

== Content ==
Many criminal defense lawyers, Halliday and Liu observed, depend on law practice for their income and generally work alone. Most of the weiquan lawyers did not start their legal careers as human rights activists. During their practice of law in criminal defense, they encountered a case that outraged them and inspired them to act. For example, a criminal defense lawyer initially rejected farmers’ plead for help until he saw firsthand the deception and corruption that the farmers faced.

Halliday and Liu also found that many of these lawyers are Christians. Because they often represent persecuted house church leaders or repressed Falun Gong believers, religious freedom is the theme of their defense. As a result, many of them were arrested, “disappeared,” and incarcerated in past years, such as Gao Zhisheng, Ni Yulan, Chen Guangcheng, Pu Zhiqiang, and Li Heping, among others in China.

Halliday and Liu point out that the criminal legal system in China remains under the control of the “iron triangle” of police, courts, and government prosecutors.

== Reviews ==
Ian Johnson, a Pulitzer-Prize-winning correspondent, reviewed the book in the August 2017 New York Review of Books. In 2022, he commented that Halliday and Liu documented how Falun Gong became a litmus test for rights lawyers. “More than a decade after the crackdown, only the lawyers most committed to free speech and freedom of association dared to take on their cases.”

Others believe the book produces “what is by far the most probing study in any language of the nature and challenges of criminal defense work in China.”

William P. Alford, Professor at Harvard Law School, considers the book “a stunning achievement.” Halliday and Liu's study of criminal defense in China find ample support that “at least a tiny portion of the legal profession consistently mobilizes to fight for basic freedoms and political liberalism in the name of ‘law.’”

== See also ==
- Gao Zhisheng
- Chen Guangcheng
- American Bar Foundation
