= Zhao Yan (journalist) =

Chinese journalist

Zhao Yan (Chinese: 赵岩; pinyin: Zhào Yán, born 14 March 1962) is a Chinese researcher employed by the Beijing bureau of The New York Times. He was imprisoned for a three-year period starting 17 September 2004, on charges of fraud, after originally being arrested for revealing state secrets. According to the BBC, he was released on 15 September 2007.

The accusation that he disclosed state secrets is related to an article in The New York Times on 7 September 2004, that correctly predicted the retirement of Jiang Zemin, former General Secretary of the Chinese Communist Party. Jiang retired on 19 September of that year. The New York Times had said that Zhao did not provide that information.

On 17 June 2006, Zhao was tried in a closed-door session in Beijing. He was found guilty of fraud but not of revealing state secrets. Zhao was sentenced to three years' jail on 24 August 2006; at that time, he had already served almost two years of his sentence. He is the first person to be charged with, but acquitted of revealing state secrets in China.

Before joining The New York Times, Zhao was a well-known investigative journalist who reported on farmers' rights issues for the Beijing-based Zhongguo Gaige 中国改革 (China Reform) magazine. He had written extensively on the plight of some 20,000 peasants who had been relocated in the 1990s to make way for the Taolinkou reservoir in Hebei Province (see Tangshan protest). He was sacked by China Reform after more than 11,000 farmers submitted a petition to the National People's Congress.
